= Open Season (franchise) =

American media franchise

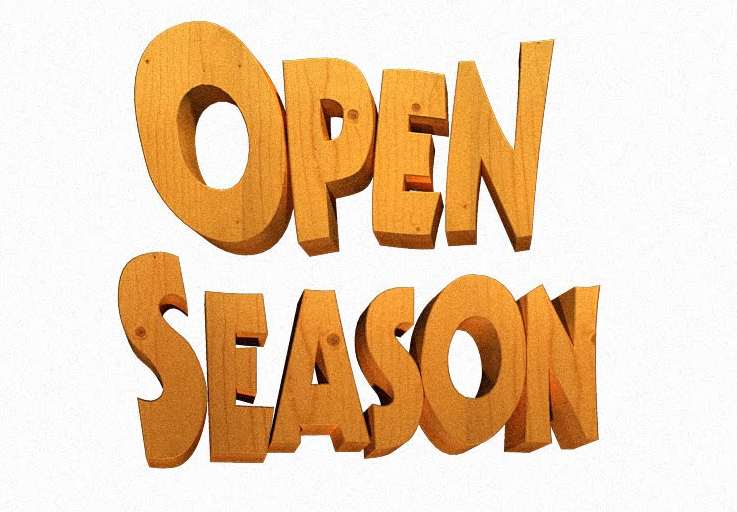
- Created by: Steve Moore; John B. Carls; Jill Culton; Anthony Stacchi
- Owner: Sony Pictures Animation
- Years: 2006–present

Films and television
- Film: Open Season
- Short film: Boog and Elliot's Midnight Bun Run
- Television series: Open Season: Call of Nature
- Direct-to-video: Open Season 2; Open Season 3; Open Season: Scared Silly

Games
- Video game: Open Season

The Open Season is an American media franchise consisting of the animated film Open Season (2006) and more movies, its direct-to-video sequels Open Season 2 (2008), Open Season 3 (2011), Open Season: Scared Silly (2016), the short film Boog and Elliot's Midnight Bun Run (2007), the television series Open Season: Call of Nature (2023–26), and a video game based on the first film.

The franchise follows Boog, a 900-pound domesticated grizzly bear who is relocated from his home in Timberline to the open forest. Alongside his one-antlered mule deer friend Elliot, he embarks on adventures that challenge their roles as wild animals.

== Films ==
=== Open Season (2006) ===
In the tranquil town of Timberline, a 900-pound grizzly bear named Boog has his perfect world turned upside down after he meets Elliot, a one-antlered mule deer. After Elliot messes up Boog's nature show, they end up tranquilized by Boog's owner Ranger Beth and then her friend Sheriff Gordy tells her to release them into the Timberline National Forest before open season for only 3 days. But when hunting season comes, it is up to Boog and Elliot to rally all the other forest animals and turn the tables on the hunters. In the end, Boog decides to stay in the forest and says goodbye to Beth (who had returned to take Boog home).

=== Open Season 2 (2008) ===
One fine spring morning, Elliot gets all prepared for his big wedding with Giselle. But little do they know, Bob and Bobbie have left a trail of dog treats in the forest for Mr. Weenie to follow, which he does and he ends up getting taken back to his original home by his owners. Elliot sees this, tells the story to Boog and the others, and they all make a mission to go save their friend before he gets turned back into a pet. In the end, Mr. Weenie thought he goes back with the wilds, but instead he decides to remain a pet once again and go live with Bob and Bobbie and the other domestics.

=== Open Season 3 (2011) ===
Boog wakes up early in his cave one spring morning and prepares for a guy's trip to start spending more time with his male friends. Unfortunately, they all decline because of family obligations; this makes Boog feel bad and take Dinkleman with him on the trip, only to discover it is not a guys trip with only one guy. He then stumbles upon a poster of the Russian Maslova Family Circus, where he meets a devious look-alike named Doug, his llama friend Alistair, and a skilled girl bear named Ursa (with whom he falls madly in love). When Doug tricks Boog into letting him switch places, Elliot and the wilds find out about this and set out to rescue their beloved bear friend (especially as the circus is going back to Russia sooner or later), with Elliot being the leader once again. In the end, Ursa decides to live with Boog and his best friends since he doesn't want to leave her or Elliot and the guy's trip becomes a success.

=== Open Season: Scared Silly (2016) ===
A few months after the events of the first film, Elliot tells a campfire story about the legend of the Wailing Wampus Werewolf that is said to live in the Timberline National Forest one night. Boog is terrified by the story and decides to not attend their annual camping trip until he knows that the werewolf is gone. Determined to help Boog overcome his fears, Elliot, Mr. Weenie, and the other woodland animals band together to scare the fear out of Boog and uncover the mystery of the Wailing Wampus Werewolf.

Former hunter Shaw, now a tour guide, returns to Timberline to get revenge on Boog and Elliot for defeating him and witnesses an unseen creature in the forest (which turns out to be Ian, a deer who is Elliot's rival, in a disguise). Shaw begs Gordy to reopen hunting season and he reluctantly does so. Despite being told to only hunt down the werewolf, Shaw becomes determined to not only catch it, but also hunt down Boog and Elliot. To carry out his plan, Shaw recruits his old friends Ed and Edna, the owners of Poutine Palace, a restaurant serving poutine. Meanwhile, a heartbroken Elliot catches the werewolf by himself after Boog angrily breaks up with him. As Boog walks through the forest, Elliot's girlfriend Giselle catches up to him and tries to convince him that Elliot was trying to help him overcome his fear and that Elliot is headed toward Dead Bear Gulch, but fails.

Meanwhile, a starving Mr. Weenie starts to believe that he is the werewolf. At Dead Bear Gulch, Elliot and Mr. Weenie are both caught by the werewolf, who is actually Shaw in a costume; fortunately, Boog and his friends leap to the rescue. Shaw is eventually overpowered and defeated, permanently shutting down open season. Gordy meets up with Boog, having recognized the bear's handiwork in defeating Shaw, and rewards him with a few treats. The animals then discover that the werewolf is real, but Elliot befriends him by dancing with him as he joins their campout. The next morning, Bobbie and Bob happily return to their RV with Mr. Weenie, and Bobbie tells Mr. Weenie that today is his birthday. The werewolf asks Boog to wear the female werewolf costume one more time, but Boog angrily refuses.

== Future ==
=== Possible fifth film ===
In an interview with ComicBook in 2016, Open Season: Scared Silly director David Feiss hinted at the possibility of a fifth film stating: "You can never be too sure, but I have a feeling that we will be seeing an Open Season 5. Everybody likes the characters and the movie and the way it turned out, so I would be surprised if there wasn’t a Open Season 5. I know people want to do another."

== Short film ==
=== Boog and Elliot's Midnight Bun Run (2007) ===
A short film titled Boog and Elliot's Midnight Bun Run is featured on the Open Season DVD and Blu-ray.

== Television series ==
=== Open Season: Call of Nature (2023–24) ===
A 2D animated series Open Season: Call of Nature was released. In this series, Boog and Elliot discover an abandoned summer camp and reinvent it as a camp for them and their friends to be wild. The series is produced by 9 Story Media Group, and first started airing on Discovery Kids in Brazil and Latin America on October 2, 2023 and later made its Canadian debut on Family Channel in November 3 the same year. In the United States, the series was released on The Roku Channel on March 10, 2024 and on Tubi in July 2024.

== Releases ==
=== Box office performance ===
Film	Release date	Revenue			Rank (Domestic)	Budget	Ref.
Film	Release date	United States	Outside United States	Worldwide	Rank (Domestic)	Budget	Ref.
Open Season	September 29, 2006	$85,105,259	$115,706,430	$200,811,689	#742	$85,000,000	
Open Season 2	September 24, 2008	Direct-to-video release	$8,797,168	$8,797,168	Direct-to-video release	—N/a	
Open Season 3	October 21, 2010	Direct-to-video release	$7,487,555	$7,487,555	Direct-to-video release	—N/a	
Open Season: Scared Silly	December 18, 2015	Direct-to-video release	$1,774,429	$1,774,429	Direct-to-video release	$5,500,000	
Total		$85,105,259	$133,765,582	$218,870,841		$90,500,000	

=== Critical response ===
Film	Rotten Tomatoes	Metacritic
Open Season	49% (103 reviews)	49% (18 reviews)
Open Season 2	36% (TBA reviews)	—N/a
Open Season 3	29% (TBA reviews)	—N/a
Open Season: Scared Silly	33% (TBA reviews)	—N/a

== Cast and crew ==
=== Cast ===
List indicators

This section includes characters who will appear or have appeared in the franchise in noteworthy roles.

- An empty grey cell indicates the character was not in the film, or that the character's official presence has not yet been confirmed.
- ^{C} indicates a cameo role.
- ^{U} indicates an uncredited appearance.
- ^{S} indicates an appearance as a character's singing voice..

Characters	Films				Short film	Television series
Characters	Open Season	Open Season 2	Open Season 3	Open Season: Scared Silly	Boog and Elliot's Midnight Bun Run	Open Season: Call of Nature
Boog	Martin Lawrence	Mike Epps	Matthew J. Munn	Donny Lucas	Martin Lawrence	Jonathan Langdon
Elliot	Ashton Kutcher	Joel McHale	Maddie Taylor	William Townsend	Ashton Kutcher	Joshua Graham
Giselle	Jane Krakowski	Jane Krakowski	Melissa Sturm	Melissa Sturm		Josette Jorge
Mr. Weenie	Cody Cameron	Cody Cameron	Cody Cameron	William Townsend	Cody Cameron	Jonathan Sconza
McSquizzy	Billy Connolly	Billy Connolly	André Sogliuzzo	Lee Tockar		Trevor White
Ian	Patrick Warburton	Maddie Taylor	Maddie Taylor	Brian Drummond		Ron Pardo
Buddy	Maddie Taylor	Maddie Taylor	Maddie Taylor	Lee Tockar		Jonathan Sconza
Serge	Danny Mann	Danny Mann	Danny Mann	Peter Kelamis		
Deni	Maddie Taylor	Maddie Taylor	Maddie Taylor	Character is mute		Cory Doran
Rosie	Nika Futterman	Nika Futterman	Nika Futterman	Shannon Chan-Kent		Katie Griffin
Maria	Michelle Murdocca	Michelle Murdocca	Michelle Murdocca	Michelle Murdocca		
Reilly	Jon Favreau	Jon Favreau^{U}	Maddie Taylor	Brian Drummond		
Bobbie	Georgia Engel	Georgia Engel	Georgia Engel	Kathleen Barr	Georgia Engel	
Bob	Character is mute	Danny Mann^{U}^{S}	Character is mute	Character is mute	Character is mute	
Beth	Debra Messing			Photograph		
Shaw	Gary Sinise			Trevor Devall		
Sheriff Gordy	Gordon Tootoosis			Lorne Cardinal	Gordon Tootoosis	
Fifi		Crispin Glover	Crispin Glover			
Roberto		Steve Schirripa	Steve Schirripa			
Stanley		Fred Stoller	Fred Stoller			
Roger		Sean P. Mullen	Sean P. Mullen			
Rufus		Diedrich Bader				
Charlene		Olivia Hack				
Fox Jaw		Jacquie Barnbrook				
Doug			Matthew J. Munn			
Ursa			Kari Wahlgren			
Alistair			Dana Snyder			
Gisela			Karley Scott Collins			
Giselita			Ciara Bravo			
Elvis			Harrison Fahn			
Ed				Garry Chalk		
Edna				Kathleen Barr		
Kiki						Annick Obonsawin
Karla						Sara Garcia
Norm						Deven Mack
Cleo						Ana Sani
RJ						Raoul Bhaneja
Napoleon						Carlo Essagian
Sugar						Sugar Lyn Beard
Wild the Wolf						Hadley Kay

- Note: A dark gray cell indicates the character does not appear in the film.

=== Crew ===
Occupation	Open Season	Open Season 2	Open Season 3	Open Season: Scared Silly
Director(s)	Jill Culton; Roger Allers; Co-directed by: Anthony Stacchi	Matthew O'Callaghan; Co-directed by: Todd Wilderman	Cody Cameron	David Feiss
Producer(s)	Michelle Murdocca	Kirk Bodyfelt; Matthew O'Callaghan	Kirk Bodyfelt	John Bush
Screenplay by	Steve Bencich, Ron J. Friedman, and Nat Mauldin	David I. Stern	David I. Stern	Carlos Kotkin
Story by	Jill Culton and Anthony Stacchi; From an original story by: Steve Moore and John B. Carls	David I. Stern	David I. Stern	Steve Barr, David Feiss, Stephan Franck, Paul McEvoy, John Norton, and Kris Pearn
Composer(s)	Paul Westerberg; Ramin Djawadi	Ramin Djawadi	Jeff Cardoni	Rupert Gregson-Williams; Dominic Lewis
Editor(s)	Pamela Ziegenhagen-Shefland	Patrick J. Voetberg; Steven Liu	Arthur D. Noda; Nancy Frazen	Maurissa Horwitz
Studios	Columbia Pictures; Sony Pictures Animation	Sony Pictures Animation; Reel FX Creative Studios	Sony Pictures Animation; Reel FX Creative Studios	Sony Pictures Animation; Rainmaker Entertainment
Distributor	Sony Pictures Releasing	Sony Pictures Home Entertainment	Sony Pictures Home Entertainment	Sony Pictures Home Entertainment

== Video game ==
- Open Season is a video game, loosely based on the first movie, and it was released by Ubisoft on September 18, 2006, on PlayStation 2, PlayStation Portable, Microsoft Windows, Game Boy Advance, Xbox 360, Xbox, Nintendo DS, and GameCube. A Wii version was released on November 30, 2006.
- The Surf's Up video game features Elliot as an unlockable playable character.
