= Open Season =

Open Season may refer to:

== Time periods ==
- Open season (hunting), when hunting a particular species is legal
- Annual enrollment or open season, when employees may make changes to benefit programs

== Film and television ==
- Open Season (1974 film), a British-Spanish film directed by Peter Collinson
- Open Season, a 1995 film featuring Robert Wuhl
- Open Season (franchise), a series of animated films
  - Open Season (2006 film), the first film in the series
  - Open Season 2 (2008)
  - Open Season 3 (2010)
  - Open Season: Scared Silly (2015)
- Open Season (2023 film), a Franco-Belgian comedy film
- "Open Season" (Criminal Minds), a 2007 television episode

== Literature ==
- Open Season (comics), a 1986–1989 comic book series by Jim Bricker
- Open Season, a 1992 Hardy Boys Casefiles novel
- Open Season Awards, offered by the Canadian literary quarterly The Malahat Review

== Music ==
- The Open Season, a 2000s Australian rock band

=== Albums ===
- Open Season (British Sea Power album), 2005
- Open Season (Feist album), 2006
- Open Season, by Emerson Drive, 1996
- Open Season, by High Tide, 2000
- Open Season, by Stubborn All-Stars, 1995

=== Songs ===
- "Open Season (Une autre saison)", by Josef Salvat, 2015
- "Open Season", by Man Overboard from Heart Attack, 2013
- "Open Season", by Stuck Mojo from Southern Born Killers, 2007

== Video games ==
- Open Season (video game), a 2006 game based on the 2006 film
- Police Quest: Open Season, a 1993 game
