= Open Season: Call of Nature =

American-Canadian animated series

- Genre: Comedy
- Based on: Open Season by Steve Moore; John B. Carls; Jill Culton; Anthony Stacchi
- Developed by: Jennie Stacey; Kent Redecker
- Directed by: Mark Thornton; Todd Kauffman
- Voices of: Jonathan Langdon; Joshua Graham
- Countries of origin: Canada; United States
- Original language: English
- No. of seasons: 1
- No. of episodes: 26 (47 segments)

Production
- Executive producers: Vince Commisso; Rick Mischel; Natalie Osborne; Blake Tohana
- Producers: Jazmin Playtis; Alicia Moore
- Running time: 22 minutes (11 minutes per segment)
- Production companies: Sony Pictures Animation; 9 Story Media Group; Brown Bag Films Toronto

Original release
- Network: Family Channel (Note: Episodes have premiered earlier on Discovery Kids in Latin America, ABC Me in Australia, and Disney Channel in Germany.)
- Release: November 3, 2023 (Note: The series first premiered in Latin America on October 2, 2023.) – February 23, 2026

Open Season: Call of Nature is an animated children's comedy television series, based on the Open Season CGI film franchise. The series follows Boog the grizzly bear and Elliot the deer as they create a new place for animals to live and embrace their inner wild. It was produced by 9 Story Media Group and Brown Bag Films in Toronto with Sony Pictures Animation. The series premiered on Family Channel on November 3, 2023.

It has also been broadcast on Discovery Kids in Latin America, ABC Entertains in Australia, Disney Channel in Germany and Nickelodeon in the United Kingdom. 26 episodes of the series were produced.

This is also the final series to involve Mark Thornton before his death in 2025.

== Premise ==
When Boog and Elliot discover an abandoned Summer Camp in the middle of nowhere, they go on a new adventure of creating a place to live that welcomes many animals. Under the leadership of Boog and Elliot, the Campers must all work together to help create their own slice of paradise in the middle of the wilderness and rediscover their inner wild.

== Cast ==
=== Main ===
- Jonathan Langdon as Boog
- Joshua Graham as Elliot

=== Supporting ===
- Josette Jorge as Giselle
- Ron Pardo as Ian
- Jonathan Sconza as Mr. Weenie
- Trevor White as McSquizzy
- Sara Garcia as Karla, a striped skunk and the camp's psychiatrist
- Annick Obonsawin as Kiki, a gibbon from a circus

=== Minor ===
- Katie Griffin as Rosie
- Cory Doran as Deni
- Deven Mack as Norm, a vegetarian turkey vulture.
- Ana Sani as Cleo
- Carlo Essagian as Napoleon
- Raoul Bhaneja as RJ
- Sugar Lyn Beard as Sugar
- Jonathan Sconza as Buddy
- Deven Mack as Vulture
- Chris Wilson as Cyril
- Julie Lemieux as Sunny
- John Cleland as Leslie
- Martin Roach as Gunner

== Episodes ==
No.	Title	Original release date
1a	"Welcome to Camp Wild"	November 3, 2023
1b	"A Break from the Norm"	November 3, 2023
2a	"The Wisdom of the Naked Mole Rats"	December 21, 2025
2b	"Doormates"	December 21, 2025
3a	"Duty Calls"	December 22, 2025
3b	"Finding Dinkleman"	December 22, 2025
4a	"The Wild Ways of Wild the Wolf"	December 25, 2025
4b	"More Bang for Your Bucks"	December 25, 2025
5	"Escape from Pet Palace"	December 26, 2025
6a	"Chore and Peace"	January 4, 2026
6b	"Hypno-Weenie"	January 4, 2026
7a	"A Shear Audacity"	January 5, 2026
7b	"Karlita's Way"	January 5, 2026
8a	"Father Fibber"	January 6, 2026
8b	"Freaky Fried Eggs"	January 6, 2026
9a	"Camp Takes Two"	January 15, 2024
9b	"Straight from the Horse's Mouth"	January 15, 2024
10a	"A Shame of Thrones"	January 10, 2026
10b	"New Phone Who's Dis"	January 10, 2026
11a	"Sleeping Boogie"	January 25, 2024
11b	"Pet vs. Pests"	January 25, 2024
12	"Camp of the Cave Bear"	January 15, 2026
13a	"Camp Palace"	March 1, 2024
13b	"Will the Real McSquizzy Please Stand Up?"	March 1, 2024
14	"Cash Camp"	April 5, 2024
15	"Treasure Island"	December 22, 2023
16a	"Hunter Gatherers"	April 12, 2024
16b	"There's No E In Team"	April 12, 2024
17a	"Uptown Squirrel"	April 19, 2024
17b	"Mother Nature's Fawn"	April 19, 2024
18	"The Possum Job"	February 10, 2026
19a	"What a Chinook"	May 31, 2024
19b	"Everybody Loves Ian"	May 31, 2024
20a	"Mr. Weenie's Trailer Trash"	May 31, 2024
20b	"Close Encounters of the Nutty Kind"	May 31, 2024
21a	"Radio Wild"	February 18, 2026
21b	"Undercover Karla"	February 18, 2026
22a	"What Happens in The Wild"	April 26, 2024
22b	"Squirrel Down"	April 26, 2024
23a	"Clowning Around"	February 20, 2026
23b	"The Deer and the Pussycat"	February 20, 2026
24a	"Playing Dead"	February 23, 2026
24b	"Beef in the Mess Hall"	February 23, 2026
25a	"Fish Out of Water"	February 9, 2024
25b	"Mukluck"	February 9, 2024
26a	"Breaking Big"	February 9, 2024
26b	"The Polar Empress"	February 9, 2024

== Broadcast ==
The series was announced on August 1, 2023. The series had its world premiere on Discovery Kids in Latin America on October 2, 2023, and it is made available on Discovery+ after the premiere. The series later premiered on Family Channel in Canada on November 3, 2023. Prior to that, a sneak peek of the series aired on October 30, 2023, after an airing of the most recent film in the Open Season franchise.

As a result of the series premiere of the show, the first three films: Open Season, Open Season 2 and Open Season 3 were aired between November 3 and 5, respectively. The French dub of the series premiered on Télémagino in Canada on February 4, 2024. The series was then followed by a German dub, which premiered on Disney Channel on February 5, 2024.

The series was broadcast on ABC Entertains (formerly ABC Me) in Australia, which premiered on February 1, 2024 and was made available on ABC iview. The series premiered on Minimax in Czechia, Hungary, Romania, Serbia and Slovenia in April 2024. The series made its debut in 2024 during the Okoo block on either France 3 or France 4 in France and on Cartoon Network in some parts of Europe and Asia. In the UK, the series premiered on Nickelodeon in July 2024.

In the United States, the series is currently available on YouTube. The series is available on HBO Max in Latin America since February 2024, with the first ten episodes and the second segment of the eleventh episode.

Most episodes of the show are also available on The Roku Channel, Amazon Prime Video, and Tubi (before being removed; as of 2026). The series is set to premiere on Cartoon Network in Southeast Asia, and soon to be available on Disney+. It is available on Paramount+ in the UK.

On October 10, 2024, 9 Story Distribution announced several licensing deals for the series with DR TV (Denmark), RTS (Switzerland), AMC Networks (CEE), Canal Panda (Portugal), RTÉ (Ireland), Paramount Media Networks (UK, Italy), Tubi, Roku, and Xumo (all three US), e.tv (South Africa), and PCCW (Hong Kong and Macau). On February 17, 2025, the series was actually broadcast on Panda Kids in Portugal instead of Canal Panda.
