= Kris Pearn =

Canadian animator

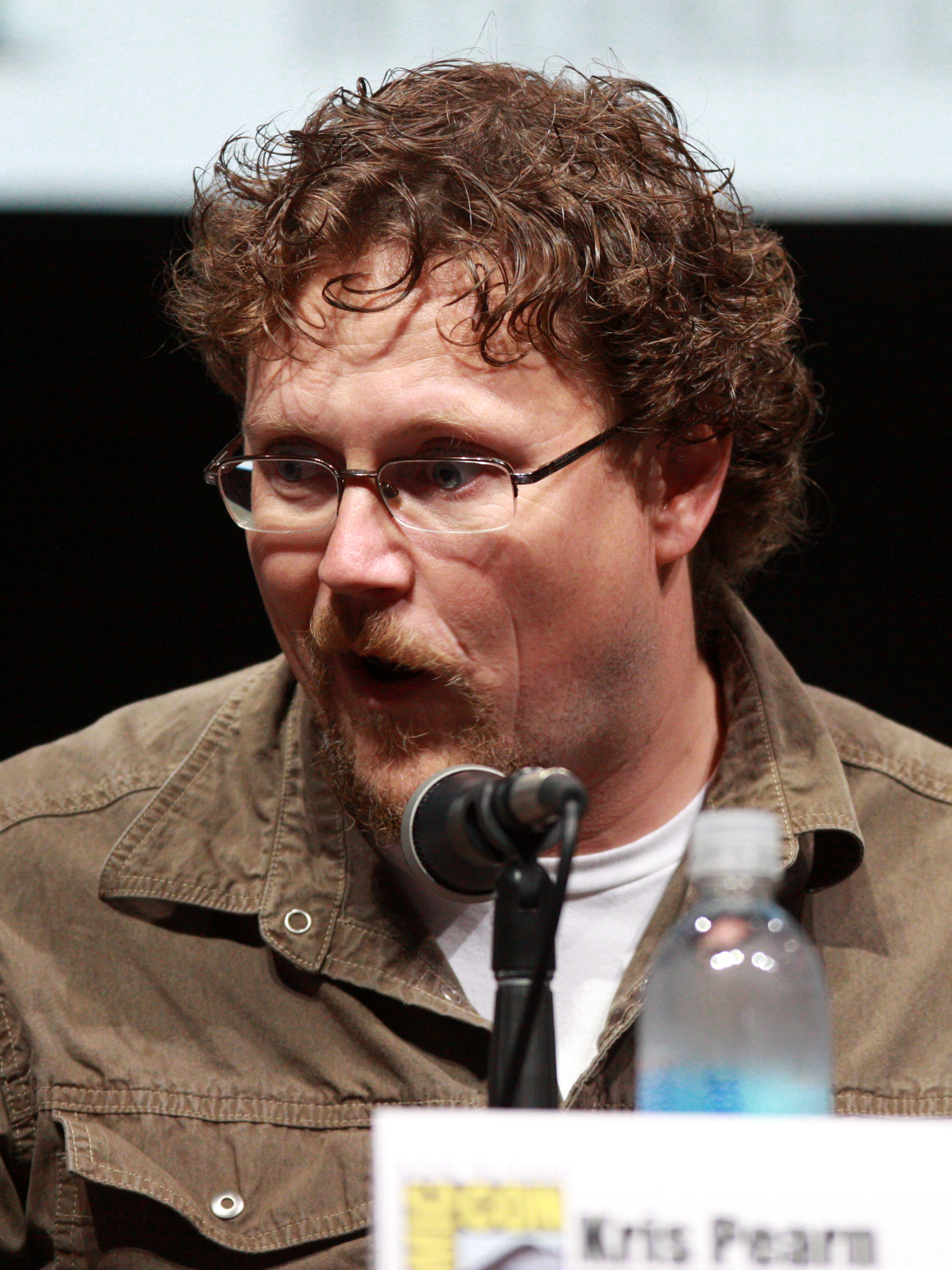

Kris Pearn is a Canadian animator, storyboard artist, writer, and director. He has co-directed the film Cloudy with a Chance of Meatballs 2 (2013) and co-wrote and directed The Willoughbys (2020).

== Early life and education ==
Pearn was born in Ontario, Canada, where his family owned a small donkey farm. Pearn attended the Strathroy District Collegiate Institute and Sheridan College..

== Career ==
Pearn's storyboarding for Open Season (2006) earned him an Annie nomination for "Storyboarding in an Animated Feature Production".

Pearn and Cody Cameron co-directed Cloudy with a Chance of Meatballs 2 (2013), the first director credit for each. The duo took over from directing team Phil Lord and Christopher Miller, announced as directors in December 2011. The voices of Sentinel Peter and Labcoat Jenny were provided by Pearn. The duo received a nomination for Satellite Award for Best Animated or Mixed Media Feature.

Pearn's storyboard work for Arthur Christmas (2011) earned him an Annie Award nomination for "Storyboarding in a Feature Production". He was also the voice of one of the elves in the film.

Pearn returned to the Open Season film series, working on the story for Open Season: Scared Silly (2015). In 2017, he wrote the animated television film The Great Northern Candy Drop.

Pearn wrote and directed The Willoughbys (2020), an animated comedy released on Netflix. Pearn also developed the story, and co-wrote the screenplay with Mark Stanleigh. He was brought onto the production four years before its release, securing distribution by Netflix early in their venture into commissioning animation. While the source book made fun of children's literature, he pivoted the production to poke at children's movie tropes. Pearn and character designer Craig Kellman had worked together previously, but he suggests that this was the first time they "could really do whatever we craved." The film's score is by Mark Mothersbaugh, who had previously worked with Pearn on Cloudy 2.

In December 2024, he was hired to direct an upcoming Ghostbusters animated film.

He has taught Character Design at Sheridan College in Oakville, Ontario. Away from animation, Pearn has illustrated the book Project Superhero, written by E. Paul Zehr, a professor of kinesiology and neuroscience. The two met at TEDx Edmonton 2012 where Zehr was giving a talk on "the superhero in you".

== Filmography ==
Year	Title	Credited as				Notes & ref(s)
Year	Title	Director	Writer	Storyboard artist	Voice Role	Notes & ref(s)
2006	Open Season	No	No	Yes	—N/a	
2007	Surf's Up	No	No	Yes	—N/a	
2008	Open Season 2	No	No	Yes	—N/a	
2009	Cloudy with a Chance of Meatballs	No	No	Yes	—N/a	Also head of story
2011	Arthur Christmas	No	No	Yes	Elf	
2012	The Pirates! In an Adventure with Scientists!	No	No	Yes	—N/a	
2013	Cloudy with a Chance of Meatballs 2	Yes	No	No	Sentinel Peter / Labcoat Jenny	
2015	Open Season: Scared Silly	No	Story	No	—N/a	
2015	Shaun the Sheep Movie	No	No	Yes	—N/a	
2015	Home	No	No	Yes	—N/a	
2017	The Great Northern Candy Drop	No	Yes	No	—N/a	Also executive producer
2018	Early Man	No	No	Yes	—N/a	
2020	The Willoughbys	Yes	Yes	No	Spoons McGee	Also executive producer
2024	The Tiger's Apprentice	No	No	Yes	—N/a	
TBA	Untitled Ghostbusters animated film	Yes	No	No	—N/a	In production
TBA	Untitled The Raccoons animated film	No	Yes	No	—N/a	In production

== Accolades ==
Award	Date of ceremony	Category	Recipient(s)	Result	Ref.
Annie Awards	February 11, 2007	Storyboarding in an Animated Feature Production	Open Season	Nominated	
Annie Awards	February 4, 2012	Storyboarding in an Animated Feature Production	Arthur Christmas	Nominated	
Annie Awards	April 16, 2021	Best Animated Feature	The Willoughbys	Nominated	
Critics' Choice Super Awards	January 10, 2021	Best Animated Movie	The Willoughbys	Nominated	
Satellite Awards	February 23, 2014	Best Animated or Mixed Media Feature	Cloudy with a Chance of Meatballs 2	Nominated	
