= Matthew J. Munn =

American actor (born 1980)

- Born: Matthew J. Munn; 1980 (age 45–46); United States
- Other names: Matt Munn; Matthew Munn
- Occupations: Voice actor, animator
- Years active: 2006–present
- Known for: Open Season 3

Matthew J. Munn (born 1980) is an American voice actor and animator for various studios. He was the voice of Boog and Doug in Open Season 3; he replaced Mike Epps as the voice of Boog from Open Season 2 (who replaced Martin Lawrence from the first film), but was replaced by Donny Lucas in Open Season: Scared Silly.

== Filmography ==
=== Film ===
Year	Title	Role	Notes
2006	Open Season	—N/a	Animator
2007	Surf's Up	—N/a	Animator
2007	I Am Legend	—N/a	Character animator
2009	Cloudy with a Chance of Meatballs	—N/a	Animator
2010	Alice in Wonderland	—N/a	Character animator
2010	Legend of the Boneknapper Dragon	—N/a	Animator
2010	Open Season 3	Boog; Doug	Voice Actor; Replacing Mike Epps (as Boog)
2011	Puss In Boots	—N/a	Animator
2012	Ice Age: Continental Drift	—N/a	Animator
2013	Epic	—N/a	Animator
2014	Rio 2	—N/a	Animator
2015	The Peanuts Movie	—N/a	Animator
2016	Ice Age: Collision Course	—N/a	Animator
2017	Ferdinand	—N/a	Animator
