= Project Superhero =

- Author: E. Paul Zehr
- Language: English
- Subject: Superhero, Debate, and Diary
- Genre: Children's literature
- Publisher: ECW Press
- Publication date: 2014
- Publication place: Canada
- Media type: Print (Hardcover)
- Pages: 224
- ISBN: 978-1-77041-180-7
- OCLC: 869266615

Project Superhero is a 2014 children's fiction/non-fiction hybrid book written by neuroscientist E. Paul Zehr and illustrated by Kris Pearn. It was first published in hardcover print in September 2014 by ECW Press. In 2015, the book was awarded a silver medal in juvenile fiction by the IPPY Awards. This is Zehr's third book, but first foray into children's fiction.

== Background ==
After his success with previous science books, Becoming Batman and Inventing Iron Man, Zehr was invited to give talks at a variety of venues, from San Diego Comic-Con to school assemblies. Often speaking at middle schools, he was asked by his young audience whether his next book would be written for them, grades six to eight. Expanding on the opportunity to write a science book for tweens, Zehr took a special interest in exploring the female role in science, athleticism, forward thinking, and artistry.

It was at TEDxEdmonton 2012 where Zehr was giving a talk on "the superhero in you", that he first met Pearn and their partnership began. Pearn is known for his work on Cloudy with a Chance of Meatballs, Cloudy with a Chance of Meatballs 2, Arthur Christmas, and Surf's Up.

== Synopsis ==
At the start of her grade eight school year, Jessie, a 13-year-old girl with a penchant for superhero comic books and journaling, is assigned a year-long school project in her Socials class called the Superhero Slam. In a head-to-head debate tournament, each student must choose a superhero to champion and be ready to present why their superhero is the best in a variety of topics including: wisdom and experience, physical strength and agility, perseverance and determination, critical thinking, recovery, courage, preparation, and leadership.

With her superhero preferences for real people equipped with additional training and technology (i.e. Batman, Iron Man), Jessie selects Batgirl as her optimal candidate and begins her research into what makes Batgirl the ideal female superhero. In order to further explore how real people can become superheroes, Jessie resolves to put herself through physical and mental conditioning. She practices martial arts with her aunt and learns about disciplines like determination through letters written to “real life superheroes.” She writes to and receives responses from:

- Mike Bruen
- Kelly Sue DeConnick
- Clara Hughes
- Bryan Q. Miller
- Christie Nicholson
- Yuriko Romer
- Nicole Stott
- Jessica Watson
- Hayley Wickenheiser

Jessie's diary entries are accented by Kris Pearn's illustrations of Jessie and her family and friends.

== Characters ==
- Jessie, the 13-year-old protagonist. Her diary follows her year-long project that culminates in the Superhero Slam. Her research takes her into the depths of heroism and what it takes be a superhero.
- Audrey, Jessie's best female friend since preschool. She shares Jessie's love of comic books. She is also heavily into working with electronics, computers, and robotics.
- Cade, Jessie's best male friend. Another avid comic book lover, he is also interested in sports and has a lot of athletic ability in a variety of sports.
- Dylan, Jessie's antagonist. He appears in frequent arguments with Jessie and her friends, pitting males as superior to females. He goes head-to-head with Jessie in the final round of the Superhero Slam.
- Shay, Jessie's younger sister. She both antagonizes and supports Jessie throughout her school year.
- Auntie G, Jessie and Shay's aunt. She is Jessie's martial arts expert and teacher, specializing in karate and kobujutsu.

== Reception ==
Kirkus Reviews gave a brief review of Project Superhero, commenting that readers should "readily respond to Jessie's mission".

Although Geek Mom gave a generally positive review, some of the heavier themes discussed (9/11, depression, insulin pumps) may require a "parental pre-read" before giving the book to its targeted eight to twelve year-old audience.
