= In the Bleachers =

American comic strip

- Author(s): Steve Moore (1985–2018); Ben Zaehringer (2018–present)
- Website: www.gocomics.com/inthebleachers
- Current status/schedule: Current daily gag panel
- Launch date: September 1, 1985; 39 years ago
- Syndicate(s): Tribune Media Services (1985–1995); Universal Press Syndicate/Universal Uclick/Andrews McMeel Syndication (1995–present)
- Publisher(s): Warner Books
- Genre(s): Sports, Humor

In the Bleachers is a comic strip that comments on, and lampoons, sports. It was created in 1985 by American cartoonist/filmmaker Steve Moore and is currently syndicated internationally by Andrews McMeel Syndication.

== Publication history ==
The single-panel cartoon appears in about 200 newspapers worldwide, including the Washington Post. Moore got the idea for In the Bleachers while working as sports editor at The Maui News. The comic was launched in September 1985, shortly after Moore was hired as an editor at the Los Angeles Times.

In a July 2018 interview, Moore said that because of his condition of essential tremor, he could no longer create the comic strip. The current writer is Ben Zaehringer.

== Collections ==
In the Bleachers has been published in six book collections, including The Best of In the Bleachers by Warner Books.

== In other media ==
In 2006, Sony Pictures Animation released the movie Open Season based on In the Bleachers hunting-related cartoons. Moore was executive producer, along with partner and producer John Carls. The movie grossed nearly $200 million worldwide. There were also sequels called Open Season 2, Open Season 3 and Open Season: Scared Silly.

On November 4, 2002, 15-second animated shorts by Ed Wexler and Gary Katona of Disney Television Animation began airing on ESPN. Voices included April Winchell, Kevin Michael Richardson and Jeff Bennett. Moore also co-directed several of the episodes.
