= Herbert Workman =

Herbert Workman may refer to:

- Herbert Brook Workman (1862–1951), Methodist
- Charles H. Workman (Charles Herbert Workman, 1873–1923), Edwardian singer, actor and comedian
