= Cody Cameron =

American film director

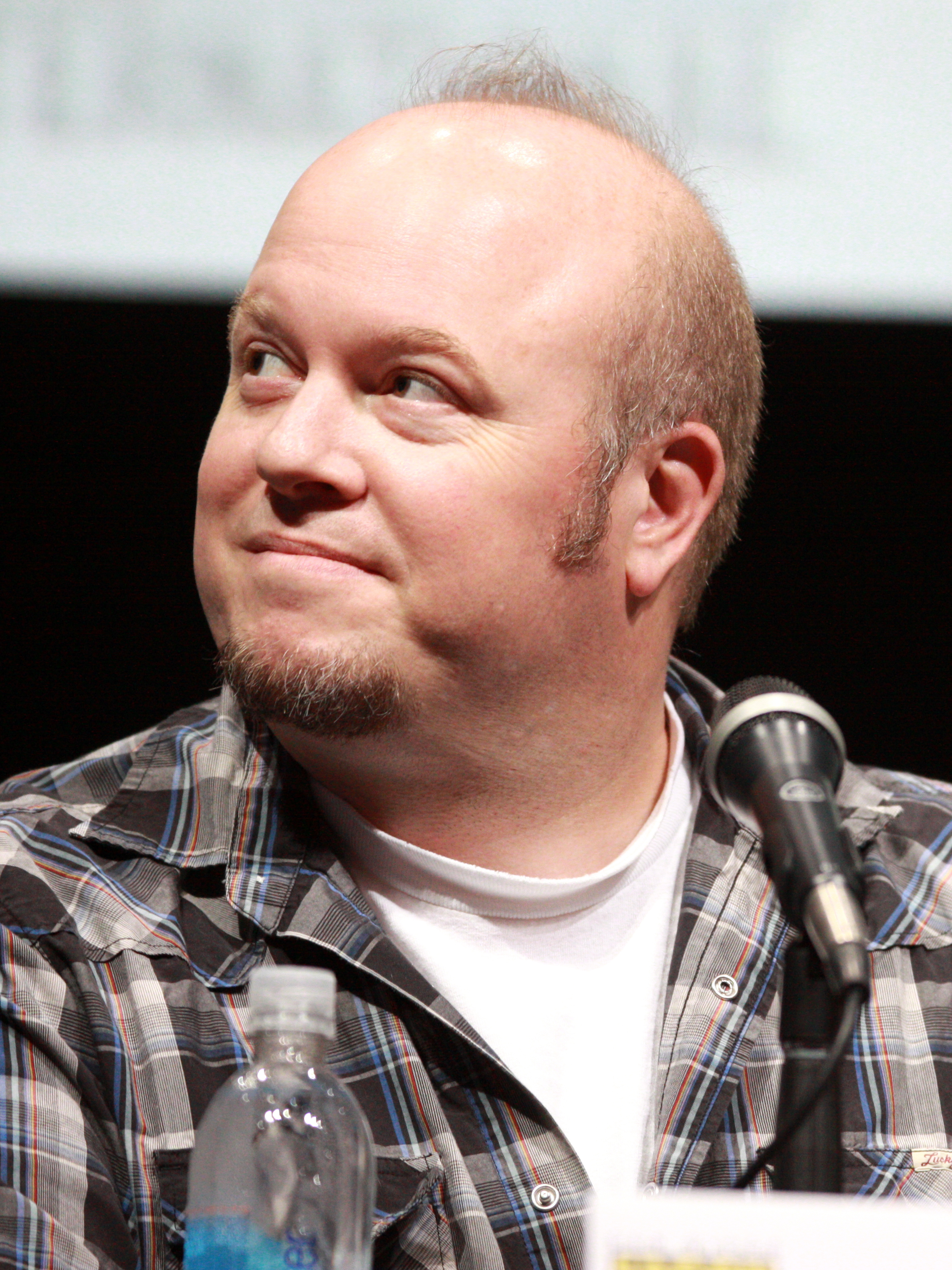
- Cameron at the 2013 San Diego Comic-Con
- Born: Cody William Cameron; October 12, 1970 (age 55); Orange County, California, U.S.
- Occupations: Voice actor; director; storyboard artist
- Years active: 1990s—present
- Notable work: Open Season; Cloudy with a Chance of Meatballs 2 Shrek
- Spouse: Rainbow Underhill

Cody William Cameron (born October 12, 1970) is an American voice actor, film director and storyboard artist best known for directing Cloudy with a Chance of Meatballs 2. He voiced many animated characters, including Pinocchio and the Three Little Pigs in the Shrek series, of which he was also a storyboard artist, and Mr. Weenie in the Open Season franchise.

== Career ==
Cameron studied animation at CalArts. He started his career at DreamWorks Animation writing dialogue and storyboarding for the Shrek franchise, Shark Tale and Madagascar.

In 2004, Cameron left DreamWorks to join Sony Pictures Animation. He worked there as a storyboard artist on Surf's Up and wrote and directed a short film The ChubbChubbs Save Xmas, a sequel to The ChubbChubbs!. Cameron also voiced Mr. Weenie in the Open Season franchise and directed Open Season 3. In 2013, he co-directed with Kris Pearn his first theatrical feature film Cloudy with a Chance of Meatballs 2.

== Personal life ==
Cameron's grandfather Bob Youngquist was a Disney animator from 1935 to 1970 and he was inspired to become an animator through his grandfather. He married Rainbow Underhill in 2023. They both met studying at CalArts. He has children. Cameron has also formed several bands.

== Filmography ==
=== Film ===
Year	Title	Voice role	Notes
2000	Chicken Run		Additional story
2001	Shrek	Pinocchio and the 3 Little Pigs	Story artist Additional dialogue
2001	Shrek in the Swamp Karaoke Dance Party	Pinocchio and the 3 Little Pigs	
2001	Morto the Magician		Special thanks
2003	Sinbad: Legend of the Seven Seas		Additional Storyboard artist
2003	Shrek 4D	Pinocchio and the 3 Little Pigs	
2004	Shrek 2	Pinocchio and the 3 Little Pigs	Additional dialogue
2004	Far Far Away Idol	Pinocchio and the 3 Little Pigs	
2004	Shark Tale		Additional storyboard artist
2005	Madagascar	Willie	Additional storyboard artist
2006	Open Season	Mr. Weenie	
2006	Boog and Elliot's Midnight Bun Run	Mr. Weenie	
2007	Surf's Up		Story artist
2007	Shrek the Third	Pinocchio, an Ogre Baby and the 3 Little Pigs	Additional dialogue and story artist
2007	Shrek the Halls	Pinocchio and the 3 Little Pigs	
2007	The ChubbChubbs Save Xmas	Elf and Aliens	
2008	Open Season 2	Mr. Weenie	
2009	Cloudy with a Chance of Meatballs	Additional voices	Story artist
2010	Open Season 3	Mr. Weenie	Director
2010	Shrek Forever After	Pinocchio and the 3 Little Pigs	
2010	Scared Shrekless	Pinocchio and the 3 Little Pigs	
2010	Donkey's Caroling Christmas-tacular	Pinocchio and the 3 Little Pigs	
2011	Thriller Night	Pinocchio and the 3 Little Pigs	
2011	The Pig Who Cried Werewolf	Horst	
2013	Cloudy with a Chance of Meatballs 2	Barry the Strawberry and the Dill Pickles	Director
2018	Spider-Man: Into the Spider-Verse		Story artist
2022	Puss in Boots: The Last Wish	Pinocchio	Additional story artist
2027	Shrek 5	Pinocchio and the 3 Little Pigs	

=== Video games ===
Year	Title	Voice role	Notes	Ref
2004	Shrek 2	3 Little Pigs		
2005	Shrek Super Slam	Pinocchio		
2006	Shrek Smash n' Crash Racing	Pinocchio and the 3 Little Pigs		
2007	Shrek the Third	Pinocchio, Evil Pinocchio, Jock #2		
2007	Shrek: Ogres and Dronkeys	Pinocchio and the 3 Little Pigs		
2008	Shrek's Carnival Craze	Pinocchio		
2010	Shrek Forever After	Pinocchio and the 3 Little Pigs	Group under additional voice talents	
