= Maddie Taylor =

American voice actor (born 1966)

- Born: December 31, 1966 (age 59)
- Occupations: Voice actress; storyboard artist
- Years active: 2006–present
- Website: maddieboom418.artstation.com

Maddie Taylor (born in Flint, Michigan, December 31, 1966), formerly Matthew W. Taylor, is an American voice actress and storyboard artist, known for voicing Verminious Snaptrap in T.U.F.F. Puppy and Sparky in The Fairly OddParents.

== Career ==
While starting as a storyboard artist at Sony Pictures Animation, Taylor lent her voice to Deni, the crazed duck, and Buddy, the blue porcupine, in the studio's first full feature Open Season, as well as voicing Elliot in the video game adaptation, replacing Ashton Kutcher. In the film's two sequels, she replaced Patrick Warburton as the strong mule deer Ian in Open Season 2, and replaced Joel McHale as the voice of Elliot in Open Season 3, before being replaced by Will Townsend in Open Season: Scared Silly.

Taylor was cast in T.U.F.F. Puppy as Verminious Snaptrap and in The Fairly OddParents as Sparky in 2013, both of which are developed by Nickelodeon and created by Butch Hartman.

In late 2016, Taylor provided the voice for interactive character Gary the Gull for the PlayStation VR. Since her transition, Taylor has been voicing more female characters. Her character in The Loud House, Dana Dufresne, transitioned to reflect her own transition.

In December 2020, Taylor provided the voice for the character of Claire Russell, a transgender bartender of the Afterlife bar in the video game Cyberpunk 2077.

In 2023, Taylor voiced Torga, a recurring character in My Dad the Bounty Hunter.

== Personal life ==
In 2016, Taylor publicly came out as a bisexual trans woman.

== Filmography ==
=== Film ===
Year	Title	Voice role	Notes
2006	The Very First Noel	Short Shepherd, Caesar, Tax Man, Townsperson	
2006	Open Season	Deni, Buddy	Also story artist
2007	Surf's Up	Glen's Buddy, Ivan	Also story artist
2007	The ChubbChubbs Save Xmas	Elf, Snowman, Witness, Fly	
2008	Open Season 2	Ian, Deni, Buddy	
2010	Open Season 3	Elliot, Ian, Reilly, Buddy, Deni, additional voices	
2011	The Voyages of Young Doctor Dolittle	Brainy Ape, Tango	
2012	Hotel Transylvania	Additional Voices	Uncredited story artist
2013	Cloudy with a Chance of Meatballs 2	Additional Voices	
2015	Open Season: Scared Silly	Additional Voices	Uncredited
2016	Gary the Gull	Gary, Frank	
2016	The Angry Birds Movie	Hamilton Pig, Acrobat Pig	
2017	Rock Dog	Additional Voices	
2019	Wonder Park		Uncredited story artist
2019	Playmobil: The Movie	Glinara	story artist
2024	Saving Bikini Bottom: The Sandy Cheeks Movie		Storyboard artist

=== Television ===
Year	Title	Voice role	Notes
2010–15	T.U.F.F. Puppy	Verminious Snaptrap, others	Credited as Matt Taylor
2013–17	The Fairly OddParents	Sparky, others	Credited as Matthew W. Taylor
2014	Mixels	Glomp, Hoogi	Episode: "Mixed Up Special"
2015	Breadwinners	Pizza Lord	Episode: "Wrath of the Pizza Lord"
2016–present	The Loud House	Dana Dufresne	Recurring role
2017-2019	The Tom and Jerry Show	Winston	"Credited as Matt Taylor"
2023	My Dad the Bounty Hunter	Torga	Voice

=== Video games ===
Year	Title	Voice role	Notes
2006	Open Season	Elliot, Beaver #3, Porcupine	
2007	Surf's Up	Reggie Belafonte, Elliot	
2013	Lightning Returns: Final Fantasy XIII	Additional Voices	
2020	Cyberpunk 2077	Claire	

=== Commercials ===
- Kraft Mac & Cheese as Cheesasaurus Rex
