= William Townshend =

William Townshend may refer to:

- William Townshend (MP) (1702–1738), British MP
- William Townshend (colonial governor) (c. 1745–1816), acting governor of Prince Edward Island
- William Townshend (cricketer) (1849–1923), English cricketer

== See also ==
- William Townsend (disambiguation)
