= Open Season 3 =

- Home video release poster
- Directed by: Cody Cameron
- Written by: David I. Stern
- Based on: Characters by Steve Moore; John B. Carls; Jill Culton; Anthony Stacchi
- Produced by: Kirk Bodyfelt
- Starring: Matthew J. Munn; Melissa Sturm; Dana Snyder; Maddie Taylor (Note: Credited as Matt Taylor.); Karley Scott Collins; Ciara Bravo; Harrison Fahn
- Edited by: Nancy Frazen; Arthur D. Noda
- Music by: Jeff Cardoni
- Production companies: Sony Pictures Animation; Reel FX Animation Studios
- Distributed by: Sony Pictures Home Entertainment
- Release dates: October 21, 2010 (United Kingdom); January 25, 2011 (United States)
- Running time: 75 minutes
- Country: United States
- Language: English
- Box office: $7.5 million

Open Season 3 is a 2010 American animated comedy film directed by Cody Cameron. It is the third installment in the Open Season film series. In the film, when Boog the grizzly bear accidentally switches places with a lookalike circus grizzly named Doug, it is up to his best friend Elliot the mule deer and the other animals to rescue him before the circus returns to Russia.

Open Season 3 was released direct-to-video in the United States on January 25, 2011. The film received negative reviews from critics and grossed $7 million.

== Plot ==
One spring morning several years after the events of the second film, Boog awakens after hibernation and plans an annual guys' trip to spend time with his best friends. Family Circus, a Russian traveling show, where he meets Doug—a lazy, self-centered, scruffy grizzly bear who can’t perform tricks and is tired of being sidelined. Doug yearns to be recognized as the king of the forest and tricks Boog into switching places, promising his Argentine camelid best friend and Elliot’s counterpart, Alistair, that he’ll return to bring him to the forest. However, Doug breaks his promise, posing as Boog to enslave the forest animals. Alistair eventually reveals Doug’s scheme to Boog back at the circus. Despite Alistair’s role in the scam, Boog forgives him, and they bond over their shared feelings of abandonment by their best friends.

While in the circus, Boog falls head over heels for Ursa, a Russian-born grizzly who can easily walk a tightrope, juggle, and dance—skills Boog calls “bearvana.” Ursa, already annoyed by Doug’s bad attitude before he left, mistakes Boog for Doug at first and is irritated by his crush. She dares him to prove he’s not Doug by climbing the high wire, which he does, only for her to admit she knew from the start—when he rode a unicycle—that he wasn’t Doug, since Doug couldn’t do that. Still, Boog gets “punished” for juggling a dog earlier to impress her. Over time, Ursa warms up to him, charmed by how different he is from other male grizzlies like Doug, who are often mean and hostile, while Boog is polite, friendly, and shares her unique upbringing around humans.

Meanwhile, Mr. Weenie and his friends, including a reformed Fifi and newcomer Nate, spot Boog in a TV commercial for the circus. Believing the acts shown are attempts to harm him, they escape to try and rescue Boog, but are caught by a gas station employee. They manage to escape again, this time using Bob and Bobbie’s RV to reach the circus. Meanwhile, Giselle, Gisela, and Giselita discover Doug is impersonating Boog and expose him to the other animals, who, led by Elliot, decide to save Boog before the circus returns to Russia. Joining forces with Mr. Weenie and the other pets, they put the plan into action. Although Boog is thrilled to see his friends, he doesn’t want to leave Ursa. Seeing his happiness with her, Elliot and the animals let him stay. Torn between his forest friends and Ursa, Boog invites her to live in the forest. Ursa agrees, but notes that a Russian circus without a bear isn’t a circus. Suddenly, Doug arrives, reunites with Alistair, and apologizes to Boog for deceiving him, realizing his mistake. With the circus now having a bear again, Ursa accepts Boog’s invitation, and leaves with him and their friends while Doug performs alongside Alistair.

The next morning, Ursa begins to enjoy her new life in the forest and ultimately becomes Boog's mate and the honorary aunt of Elliot and Giselle's kids. Ursa assures Boog she is content with him spending time with his male friends. Finally, Boog, Elliot, and their male friends go on their guys' trip and sing part of Willie Nelson's "On the Road Again." Elsewhere, Mr. Weenie and the pets travel to Devils Tower with Bob and Bobbie as they've been currently searching for aliens, and the circus begins its long journey back to Russia. In the ending credits, Doug and Alistair reveal a slideshow of themselves enjoying their tour around the world as they make their way back home.

== Cast ==
- Matthew J. Munn as Boog / Boog's Shoulder Angel / Boog's Shoulder Devil / Doug, a scruffy grizzly bear who looks like Boog.
- Melissa Sturm as Giselle / Ursa, a female grizzly bear with a Russian accent who later becomes Boog's love interest.
- Dana Snyder as Alistair, a llama and Doug's best friend.
- Maddie Taylor as Elliot / Elliot's Shoulder Angel / Elliot's Shoulder Devil / Ian / Reilly / Buddy / Deni
- Karley Scott Collins as Gisela, a mule deer fawn and Giselle and Elliot's eldest daughter.
- Ciara Bravo as Giselita, a mule deer fawn and Giselle and Elliot's second eldest daughter.
- Harrison Fahn as Elvis, a mule deer fawn and Giselle and Elliot's youngest son.
- Cody Cameron as Mr. Weenie
- André Sogliuzzo as McSquizzy
- Danny Mann as Serge
- Crispin Glover as Fifi
- Steve Schirripa as Roberto
- Fred Stoller as Stanley
- Sean Mullen as Roger
- Georgia Engel as Bobbie
- Nika Futterman as Rosie
- Michelle Murdocca as Maria

== Production ==
The film was animated at Reel FX Creative Studios, which also animated Open Season 2 along with Sony Pictures Imageworks. A teaser trailer for the film was released on January 5, 2010, on the Cloudy with a Chance of Meatballs DVD.

== Release ==
Like the second and fourth film, Open Season 3 was released theatrically in different countries.

=== Home media ===
The film was released on DVD and Blu-ray in the United States on January 25, 2011, by Sony Pictures Home Entertainment (under Columbia Pictures). Unlike the other movies, this one was not released on UMD Video.

== Reception ==
DVD Verdict gave the film a negative review, saying: "This tiresomely predictable tale exemplifies everything that's wrong about straight-to-DVD animated sequels to big-budget mainstream films: the plot is utterly predictable and rehashes a lot of beats from the original effort, the major voice actors have been replaced by poor substitutes and the quality of the animation has dropped dramatically (most of the visuals are on the level of a video game or one of those cheap CGI Saturday morning TV shows)". R.L. Shaffer of IGN gave the film a slightly positive review saying the animation is fine, and the kids are bound to enjoy it, but Open Season 3 boasts a dull story that feels like it's on autopilot. The film received 29% in rotten tomatoes.

== Sequel ==
The sequel Open Season: Scared Silly premiered in theaters in Turkey on December 18, 2015, and was released on DVD and Blu-ray in the United States and Canada on March 8, 2016.
