= E. Paul Zehr =

Canadian neuroscientist

- Born: June 16, 1968; Canada
- Scientific career
- Fields: kinesiology; neuroscience

E. Paul Zehr (born June 16, 1968) is a Canadian professor of kinesiology and neuroscience, and a science communicator at the University of Victoria, in British Columbia, Canada. He is known for his work in neural plasticity associated with exercise training and rehabilitation. Zehr is best known to the general public as the author of the popular science books Becoming Batman: The Possibility of a Superhero (2008), Inventing Iron Man: The Possibility of a Human Machine (2011), Project Superhero (2014), and Chasing Captain America (2018).

== Becoming Batman ==
Becoming Batman addresses the scientific feasibility of a human being ever achieving peak of performance embodied by the Caped Crusader, and is essentially a guide for understanding how the human body works and responds to exercise. Zehr, a long-time reader of comic books, drew on the combined expertise gained in undergraduate (BPE, McMaster University) and graduate (MSc) training in kinesiology with his knowledge of neuroscience (PhD; University of Alberta) and his more than 25 years of personal experience in martial arts. A main point of Zehr's book is that despite all the technology and gadgetry, there is a real person inside the batsuit who needs extreme training. Zehr often points out that this training includes not just Batman's muscles but also his bones.

== Inventing Iron Man ==
Inventing Iron Man examines the Marvel superhero as a biological control problem. The book explores what it would mean to the human body, and the nervous system particularly, to use an integrated exoskeleton like the Iron Man suit of armor. Inventing Iron Man explores deeply the concept of brain–machine interface and develops the thesis that such an exoskeleton could only work if it were connected directly to the brain of the user. A main focus are the changes that would occur in the nervous system (neural plasticity) as a result of prolonged use of such a comprehensive neuroprosthetic.

== Project Superhero ==
Project Superhero follows Jessie, a 13-year-old girl, and her diary as she documents a year-long school project called the Superhero Slam. Unlike his previous books, Zehr wrote Project Superhero with a middle school aged audience in mind, aiming specifically at girls. Where he previously used superheroes as a means for relaying scientific research and queries surrounding human physiology, he wanted to look at what "superheroes represent in our culture as seen through Jessie's eyes". Zehr interviewed real life heroes that provide Jessie with expert advice, including: Mike Bruen, Kelly Sue DeConnick, Clara Hughes, Bryan Q. Miller, Christie Nicholson, Yuriko Romer, Nicole Stott, Jessica Watson, and Hayley Wickenheiser.

Illustrations were provided by Kris Pearn, known for work such as Cloudy with a Chance of Meatballs.

In 2015, Project Superhero was awarded a silver medal in Juvenile Fiction by the IPPY Awards.

== Awards ==
- 2019 Award for Excellence in Graduate Student Supervision and Mentorship, REACH Award, University of Victoria, Victoria, BC, Canada
- 2015 Science Educator Award. The Society of Neuroscience (SFN), supported by The Dana Foundation. This award honors two outstanding neuroscientists who have made significant contributions to educating the public about neuroscience: one who conducts education activities full-time, and one who devotes his/her time primarily to research while conducting outreach, policy and education activities.
- 2015 Independent Publisher (IPPY) Silver Medalist for Juvenile Fiction – Project Superhero
- 2012 Craigdarroch Research Award, Award for Excellence in Knowledge Mobilization, University of Victoria, Victoria, BC, Canada. This award recognizes a specific project, product, service or body of work that demonstrates excellence in Knowledge Mobilization (KM), defined as the purposeful communication, exchange and application of knowledge developed through an ongoing process of research and/or creative and artistic endeavour for the benefit of society.
