= William Townsend =

William or Bill Townsend may refer to:

- William Townsend (Arkansas politician) (1914–2005), American politician and optometrist from Arkansas
- William Townsend (cricketer) (1821–1891), English cricketer and barrister
- William Townsend (mayor) (1821–1882), Australian politician from South Australia
- William Townsend (New York politician) (1848–1919), American politician from New York
- William A. Townsend (1904–1993), British philatelist
- William Cameron Townsend (1896–1982), American Christian missionary
- William Charles Townsend (1803–1850), English barrister and writer
- William George Paulson Townsend (1868–1941), English artist, designer and writer
- William H. Townsend (1812–1873), Canadian politician from Nova Scotia
- William John Townsend (1835–1915), British Methodist minister
- William Kneeland Townsend (1849–1907), American federal judge from Connecticut
- William Richard Townsend (died 1914), British lawyer and colonial administrator
- William T. Townsend, founder and CEO of Barrett Technology
- Bill Townsend (born 1965), businessman
- Bill Townsend (footballer) (1922–1988), English football player and manager

== See also ==
- William Townshend (disambiguation)
