= The Vigil (1998 film) =

- Theatrical release poster
- Directed by: Justin MacGregor
- Starring: Donny Lucas; Trevor White
- Release date: January 1998
- Running time: 86 minutes
- Country: Canada

The Vigil is a 1998 comedy film about a group of young people who travel from Lethbridge, Alberta, Canada to Seattle in the United States to attend the memorial vigil for Nirvana band leader Kurt Cobain in 1994. It stars Donny Lucas and Trevor White.

== Background ==
Kurt Cobain who was the singer and guitarist of American rock band Nirvana committed suicide in April 1994. A memorial vigil was held for him on April 10, 1994, at the Seattle Center in Seattle, Washington. According to British music newspaper Melody Maker the vigil was attended by 5,000 people aged 12 to 45. According to British music newspaper NME it was attended by 10,000 people. According to Michael Azerrad's 1994 extended chapter edition of his book Come as You Are: The Story of Nirvana it was attended by 7,000 people.

== Synopsis ==
After the suicide of Kurt Cobain a group of friends are inspired to borrow a Winnebago and travel from Lethbridge, Alberta, Canada to the Kurt Cobain memorial vigil in Seattle, Washington. The two main characters Simon (Damon Johnson) and Nick (Donny Lucas) are both vegetarians who work at the same hamburger shop. In their spare time they socialize with their friends at a diner where they discuss the Seattle grunge scene and in particular Cobain's band Nirvana. The group of five set off and on their way pick up a punk rocker hitchhiker. As time goes on tensions rise between the group.

The film was directed by Justin MacGregor.

MacGregor stated that:

a lot of my friends felt compelled to hold their own vigils after they heard the news from Seattle ... I felt compelled to tell this story ... and I wanted to do it independently ... before it became a Hollywood film ... made by people who didn't understand why it mattered to so many of us in the first place.

== Reception ==
A review by nirvanadiscography.com stated that as the film does not contain any of Nirvana's music it does not have much relevance to the band. A retrospective review by Rolling Stone also noted that the film does not include Cobain or any of Nirvana's music. A 2014 retrospective review of the film by Jennifer Otter Bickerdike was more positive, stating that although it was a low-budget film it still manages to capture and celebrate what other films about Cobain fail to do: "the power of music to build and sustain community in a truly authentic way" and that "The Vigil succeeds in illustrating the inherent solace art can provide when other means of redemption have failed". The film has been available on Netflix.

== Related ==
In April 1994 a real life mini-documentary was filmed at Cobain's vigil and it was titled Stupid Club. Its title comes from when in the wake of Cobain's death his mother said "Now he's gone and joined that stupid club, I told him not to join that stupid club". This was in reference to the 27 Club – mostly of popular musicians, artists, actors, and other celebrities who died at age 27. Stupid Club was ranked number 3 in the Hairpin's A Definitive Ranking of Every Kurt Cobain Movie Ever Made.
