= Open Season (video game) =

2006 video game

- North American PlayStation 2 cover art
- Developers: Ubisoft Montreal; Ubisoft Quebec
- Publisher: Ubisoft
- Composer: Shawn K. Clement
- Engine: Unreal Engine 2
- Platforms: Game Boy Advance, GameCube, Nintendo DS, PlayStation 2, PlayStation Portable, Wii, Microsoft Windows, Xbox, Xbox 360
- Release: NA: September 18, 2006; EU: October 6, 2006; AU: November 30, 2006; AU: December 14, 2006 (DS, PSP); Wii: NA: November 30, 2006; EU: December 22, 2006; AU: January 27, 2007
- Genre: Action-adventure
- Modes: Single-player, multiplayer

Open Season is an action-adventure game, based on the CGI-animated film of the same name. It was released for Wii, PlayStation 2, PlayStation Portable, Microsoft Windows, Game Boy Advance, Xbox 360, Xbox, Nintendo DS, and GameCube. The Nintendo DS version supports the Nintendo Wi-Fi Connection.

While Patrick Warburton, Maddie Taylor, Nika Futterman, and Danny Mann reprise their roles from the film, most of the original voice actors were replaced (for example, Chris Williams and Maddie Taylor are the voices of Boog and Elliot in this game).

== Plot ==
Boog (Chris Williams) is a 900-pound grizzly who is the star of the town of Timberline's nature show. In a dream, Boog pursues a giant version of his teddy bear Dinkleman, but he is soon woken by Beth (Kari Wahlgren), who takes him to the town center for Boog's performance. But Beth finds that Shaw (Darryl Kurylo), a cruel hunter, has already hunted a buck. She goes into the police office of her best friend, Sheriff Gordy (Carlos Alazraqui), to confront Shaw. The buck wakes up and introduces himself, his name being Elliot (Maddie Taylor). Boog reluctantly frees him, and Shaw vows revenge on Boog after Gordy tells him he's been living in the woods too long. That night, Elliot decides to "free" Boog in return. He manages to lure him to the convenience store, where they finish all the chocolate bars there, but they're discovered by the police and incapacitated with a tranquilizer gun by Beth and brought to the Timberline National Forest until the start of open season. There, Elliot claims that he knows how to get back to Timberline, prompting a road trip.

They encounter a squirrel called McSquizzy (Michael Gough) and his army of squirrels called the Furry Tail Clan (Carlos Alazraqui), who abuse them with nuts. Boog meets a few members of Elliot's herd: Giselle (Kari Wahlgren), a doe whom Elliot has a crush on, and Ian (Patrick Warburton), the head of the herd who hates Elliot. It's revealed that during this time of year, the Deer Games are held, with only one sport: Running. Elliot competes with Ian and wins the race, but he's kicked away by a jealous Ian as revenge. In the Timberline National Forest, Boog and Elliot help all kinds of animals with their tasks. The two meet McSquizzy again, who directs them to a shortcut: A mine. After riding through the mine in a minecart, Boog and Elliot continue their journey across a valley, and climb up a mountain, only to encounter Shaw, they escape the hunter by rolling down the hill in a big snowball. They get to a beaver's dam, which Elliot claims is the way home. Not letting them cross, the two help the beavers find a missing piece for the dam: An outhouse. They find Boswell (Maurice LaMarche), trying to push the outhouse down from a hunting camp. Boog and Elliot jump onto it, and it quickly breaks and they ride it down the river rapids until they reach the dam. Boog quickly realizes that Elliot had never known how to go to Timberline because he'd asked some moles (since they're blind) for directions. Boog's weight causes the dam to break up. Having lost Elliot in the flood, Boog looks for shelter for the night. Boog enters Shaw's house, only to be confronted by Shaw himself. Shaw locks Boog in his basement but Boog eventually escapes, and encounters McSquizzy on a sign, who threatens to not show him the way back home if he doesn't help the animals during open season. Boog goes the right way, but he decides to go back and help the animals, suggesting to the wilds that they fight back.

Agreeing to this, Serge (Danny Mann), Deni, and the rest of the ducks fly around the Timberline National Forest, dropping propane tanks everywhere, while the other animals collect items helpful for the fight. The wilds ultimately win the battle against the hunters. But while they're celebrating, Shaw appears and tries to shoot Boog. Elliot sacrifices himself by jumping in front of Boog and takes the hit instead, seemingly killing him, which angers Boog. Boog defeats Shaw after throwing a skunk, a rabbit, and a squirrel at him, roars him, and then he ties Shaw up with his gun. The game then closes as Elliot awakens having survived the gunshot and the wilds celebrate their victory by mauling Shaw.

== Gameplay ==
The game's genre is action-adventure. In the game, the player must do tasks for the forest animals, and when players complete a certain number, that species will become their companions, and let players throw them at hunters. Players can play as Boog and Elliot who can perform a variety actions including: Boog being able to throw skunks through hunter's chimneys to scare them and Elliot being able to jump, sneak past hunters and luring them into traps. When players beat the game, they can play the mini-games they unlocked in single and multiplayer, where in which Beth and Shaw are also playable.

== Reception ==
Reception

Aggregate scores
| Aggregator | Score | | | | | | | | |
| Aggregator | DS | GBA | GameCube | PC | PS2 | PSP | Wii | Xbox | Xbox 360 |
|---|---|---|---|---|---|---|---|---|---|
| GameRankings | 72% | 75% | 62% | 58% | 48% | 67% | 45% | 61% | 59% |
| Metacritic | 72/100 | N/A | 59/100 | 58/100 | 57/100 | N/A | 49/100 | 59/100 | 59/100 |

Review scores
| Publication | Score | | | | | | | | |
| Publication | DS | GBA | GameCube | PC | PS2 | PSP | Wii | Xbox | Xbox 360 |
|---|---|---|---|---|---|---|---|---|---|
| Eurogamer | N/A | N/A | N/A | N/A | N/A | N/A | N/A | N/A | 4/10 |
| GameSpot | 7.3/10 | N/A | 5.3/10 | 5.3/10 | 5.3/10 | 7.1/10 | 3.9/10 | 5.3/10 | 5.3/10 |
| IGN | 7/10 | 7.5/10 | 6/10 | 6/10 | 6/10 | 6.3/10 | 6/10 | 6/10 | N/A |

According to Metacritic, the game received “mixed or average” reviews on all platforms except the Wii version, which received "generally unfavorable" reviews.

Reviewing the PS2, GameCube, PC, and Xbox versions for IGN Mark Bozon said that when compared to other tie in games for children CGI-animated movies, such as Ice Age 2: The Meltdown, it was "more concerned with variety than it was overall polish". He did however think that it "did manage to deliver an escapade that's sure to keep young gamers busy, while still throwing in a few hints of more mature gameplay mechanics to usher the little tikes into more complex play styles in the future." He thought much the same about the Wii port, adding that "like so many of the other Wii launch titles, [it was] a double-dip attempt based on an original GameCube game" only with Wii motion controls, which he called "basic" but functional. GameSpot's Frank Provo was much more critical of the Wii version giving it a 3.9/10, compared to the GameCube version's score of 5.3/10. He commented that "Open Season was a mediocre adventure game on the GameCube, and it's even worse on the Wii thanks to the cruddy controls and higher price tag."

The handheld versions of the game where generally better reviewed. Provo would call the DS version "a slick action game that plays like a bizarre mash-up of Metal Slug and Mario" and gave it 7.3/10, with his main problem being the game's short length. Jack DeVries reviewing the Game Boy Advance version for IGN, concluded that while wasn't "a perfect game by any means", with "some lazy animations" and the "music [was] far from great", it had "an undeniable charm" and was "filled with a lot of cute, and fun characters". He also thought it had a well told story as well as "some nicer than usual cutscenes."
