= Trevor White (actor) =

Canadian actor (born 1970/1971)

- Born: 26 October 1970 (age 55)
- Education: Queen's University (B.A., 1992)
- Occupation: Actor
- Years active: 1994–present
- Spouse: Eleanor Matsuura (m. 2014)
- Children: 1

Trevor White (born 26 October 1970) is a Canadian actor who has been based in London, England, since 2001.

== Career ==
White is based in London. Film and television credits include: Industry, I Hate Suzie, Doctor Who, The Dark Knight Rises, Downton Abbey, Jason Bourne, World War Z, Die Another Day, and Burton & Taylor. He has had recurring roles on The Durrells, Millennium, Episodes, Hunted, and X Company.

On stage, he has played Hotspur in Henry IV, and Tullus Aufidius in Coriolanus, for the Royal Shakespeare Company. White also played James Tyrone Jr. in the 2012 West End production of Eugene O'Neill's Long Day's Journey Into Night, which won the 2013 Olivier Award for Best Revival. White was cast as Harry Potter in the Canadian premiere of Harry Potter and the Cursed Child, which opened in 2022 in Toronto.

White is also a regular in the Assassin's Creed franchise, and has voiced dozens of other video games, including Star Wars: Battlefront, Mass Effect: Andromeda, The Division, and LittleBigPlanet 2. He was the voice of Frank Honey in Lego City Undercover, and Phoenix Wright in Professor Layton vs. Phoenix Wright: Ace Attorney.

In 2018, he played James Blake the bus driver whom Rosa Parks defied in 1955, prompting the Montgomery bus boycott, in the episode "Rosa", of the BBC series Doctor Who.

== Personal life ==
In 2014, White married actress Eleanor Matsuura, whom he met in 2006 when they performed together in a Royal Shakespeare Company production of Coriolanus; as of 2016, the couple were living in the West Hampstead district of London. The couple have a daughter, born in 2017.

== Filmography ==
=== Film ===
Year	Title	Role	Notes
1996	A Kidnapping in the Family	Assistant Director	Television film
1996	Groomed	Alex	Short film
1998	In the Doghouse	Soundstage Guard	Television film
1998	The Vigil	Jase	
1999	The Rememberer	Clyde	Short film
2000	Saving Grace	Wally	Uncredited
2000	The Inspectors 2: A Shred of Evidence	Cop in Bank Garage	Television film
2000	Epicenter	Ivan Semenov	
2001	Death Train to the Pacific		Television film
2001	Strange Frequency	Disco Man (segment "Disco Inferno")	Television film
2002	Hellraiser: Hellseeker	Bret	Direct-to-video
2002	Die Another Day	Jumpmaster	Uncredited
2004	Mindhunters	Attacker	
2005	Kenneth Tynan: In Praise of Hardcore	Zack	Television film
2006	9/11: The Twin Towers	Rick Bryan	
2007	Saddam's Tribe: Bound by Blood	Carl Gregson	Television film
2007	Training Daljinder	Drunk	Short film
2008	Genova	Michael	
2008	Agent Crush	Major Rusty Gubbins (voice)	
2009	Echelon Conspiracy	Paul Spencer	
2009	Vincent	David	Short film
2009	Moonshot	Alan Shepard	Television film
2009	Hotel	Roger Barron	Short film
2010	Godforsaken	Paul Matheson	
2010	The Whistleblower	Carl	Uncredited
2011	Super Eruption	Simon	Television film
2012	The Dark Knight Rises	Yuppie	
2012	Best Possible Taste: The Kenny Everett Story	Garner Ted Armstrong	Television film
2013	World War Z	C-17 Pilot	Uncredited
2013	Burton & Taylor	Journalist	Television film
2014	Royal Shakespeare Company: Henry IV Part I	Hotspur	
2014	Royal Shakespeare Company: Henry IV Part II	Mowbray	
2016	Jason Bourne	Senior Agent Collier	
2017	Mad to Be Normal	Bryan	
2017	Joe Finds Grace	Wally	
2017	American Assassin	Dr. Frain	
2017	Anchor and Hope	Martin	
2018	Astral	Gareth Powell	
2018	Tad the Lost Explorer and the Secret of King Midas	Tad Stones (voice)	English version
2019	Blood	Vinnie	Short film
2019	Rare Beasts	Leonardo	
2019	Tornare	Patrick McNellis	
2020	Mainstream	Ben	
2022	Tad, the Lost Explorer and the Emerald Tablet	Tad Stones (voice)	English version
2026	Tad and the Magic Lamp	Tad Stones (voice)	English version

=== Radio ===
Year	Title	Role	Notes
2011	The Million Pound Bank Note	Henry Adams	
2019	A Terrible Country	Andrei Kaplan	

=== Television ===
Year	Title	Role	Notes
1996	The Sentinel	Brother Timothy	Episode: "Vow of Silence"
1997	Madison	Corporal Carter	Episode: "Fallout"
1997, 1999	Millennium	Doug Scaife, Caspar	5 episodes
1998	Viper	Young Bud Minnick	Episode: "The Getaway"
1999	The Outer Limits	Vince Carter	Episode: "The Other Side"
2000	Beggars and Choosers	Teddy	Episode: "Killer Sushi"
2001	Da Vinci's Inquest	Constable Miller	Episode: "The Sparkle Tour"
2001	Strange Frequency	Disco Man	Episode: "Disco Inferno"
2005	I Shouldn't Be Alive	John	Episode: "Shark Survivor"
2006	The Line of Beauty	Brad	Episode: "The End of the Street"
2006	The Path to 9/11	Scott Ramer	2 episodes
2006	Ultimate Force	Cpl. Tony Ritzik	Episode: "The Dividing Line"
2007	Judge John Deed	Clerk	2 episodes
2008	Bonekickers	Bobby	Episode: "Warriors"
2008–2011; 2013–2015	Chuggington	Eddie (US voice)	40 episodes
2008	House of Saddam	CIA Officer Newman	Episode: "Episode #1.3"
2010	Foyle's War	George Hall	Episode: "Killing Time"
2011	Chuggington: Badge Quest	Eddie (US voice)	Episode: "Couriers"
2011	Downton Abbey	Major Patrick Gordon	Episode: "Episode #2.6"
2012	Episodes	Assistant Director	7 episodes
2012	Hunted	Patrik Lindberg	2 episodes
2016–2021	Thomas & Friends	Eric (US voice)	
2016–2017	X Company	Schroeder	6 episodes
2017	SS-GB	Daniel Hapkiss	2 episodes
2018	The Durrells	Henry Miller	2 episodes
2018	Doctor Who	James Blake	Episode: "Rosa"
2019	Counterpart	Croft	Episode: "Twin Cities"
2019	En el corredor de la muerte	Casimir	Episode: "1993-1994"
2020	I Hate Suzie	Bruce Wolf	Episode: "Shame"
2020–2024	Industry	Bill Adler	9 episodes
2023–2024	Open Season: Call of Nature	McSquizzy	Recurring

=== Video games ===
Year	Title	Role	Notes	Source
2000	Kessen	Naomasa Yi	English version	
2002	Archangel	Mark Hauser, Homeless #1, Berlin Citizen, Factory Worker, KEOS Scientist, Chaos Soldier	English version	
2009	Killzone 2	Additional ISA voices		
2009	Colin McRae: Dirt 2	US male		
2009	Dead Space: Extraction	Additional voices		
2010	GoldenEye 007	Additional voices		
2010	Battlefield: Bad Company 2: Vietnam	US soldier		
2011	Operation Flashpoint: Red River	Marines		
2012	007 Legends	Additional voices		
2012	Forza Horizon			
2012	Assassin's Creed III	Additional voices		
2013	Lego City Undercover	Frank Honey		
2013	Remember Me			
2013	Company of Heroes 2	The Western Front Armies DLC, Ardennes Assault DLC		
2013	Killzone: Mercenary	Blackjack		
2013	Assassin's Creed IV: Black Flag	Additional voices		
2014	Professor Layton vs. Phoenix Wright: Ace Attorney	Phoenix Wright	English version	
2014	Assassin's Creed Unity	Additional voices		
2014	Fractured Space	Stelland Shaw		
2015	Star Wars Battlefront	Additional voices		
2016	Tom Clancy's The Division	McPherson	Uncredited	
2016	Homefront: The Revolution			
2016	Mirror's Edge: Catalyst	Additional voices		
2016	Battlefield 1			
2017	Mass Effect: Andromeda	Avitus Rix		
2018	Ni no Kuni II: Revenant Kingdom	Zip Vector	English version	
