= William John Townsend =

British Methodist minister

William John Townsend (20 January 1835 – 7 March 1915) was a British minister of the Methodist New Connexion. He wrote on theology and the history of Methodism, writing biographies of Robert Morrison and Alexander Kilham. He also wrote a book on scholastic philosophy.

== Life ==
William John Townsend was born in Newcastle-upon-Tyne, the son of Joseph and Mary Townsend. He was educated at Percy Street Academy in Newcastle. He worked in business for several years, before studying at Ranmoor College in Sheffield and becoming a minister of the Methodist New Connexion in 1860. He was President of the Methodist New Connexion Conference in 1886, and edited the Methodist New Connexion from 1893 to 1897.

The Great Schoolmen of the Middle Ages (1881) tried to provide "a fairer and higher estimate of the great Schoolmen" than as "solemn triflers [...] or as mere metaphysical gymnasts", and sketch a "rationale of Scholasticism":

receiving the mass of Church dogma as an act of faith, it was the earnest, persevering laborious effort of the Schoolmen to justify the particulars of that mass of dogma to their reason and understanding [...] They failed, but their failure was really their greatest victory [...] Out of the patient faith, the consecrated lives, the high reasonings, [...] there have come victories of faith, experiences of freedom, attainments of truth, possibilities of facile expression of the noblest subjects, the unrestrained exercise of reason and conscience.

== Works ==
- Madagascar: its missionaries and martyrs, 1880.
- The great schoolmen of the middle ages. An account of their lives, and the services they rendered to the church and the world, 1881.
- Robert Morrison: the pioneer of Chinese missions, 1888.
- Alexander Kilham: the first Methodist reformer, 1889.
- James Stacey, D.D.: reminiscences and memorials, 1891.
- A handbook of Christian doctrine, 1897.
- A handbook for the Methodist New Connexion containing information of its doctrines, ministers, churches, institutions, legal relations, &c, 1899.
- Life of Oliver Cromwell: Tercentenary celebration, 1900.
- The great symbols, 1901.
- 'Sketch of the history of popular education in England and Wales', in The Free churchman's guide to the Education Act by Edmund C. Rawlings, 1902.
- As a king ready to the battle, 1904.
- The story of Methodist Union, 1905.
- (with H. B. Workman and G. Eayrs) A new history of Methodism, 1909.
