= Becoming Batman =

2008 book by E. Paul Zehr

Becoming Batman: The Possibility of a Superhero
- Author: E. Paul Zehr
- Language: English
- Subject: Physiology and Superhero comics
- Genre: Non-fiction
- Publisher: Johns Hopkins University Press
- Publication date: 2008
- Publication place: Canada
- Media type: Print (Hardcover)
- Pages: 300
- ISBN: 978-0-8018-9063-5
- OCLC: 213408580
- Dewey Decimal: 613.7 22
- LC Class: PN6728.B363 Z45 2008

Becoming Batman: The Possibility of a Superhero is a 2008 science book by neuroscience professor E. Paul Zehr. The book was first published on November 7, 2008, through Johns Hopkins University Press and covers how much an ordinary person would need to train and adapt to become Batman. Becoming Batman is unique in its explicit analysis of whether or not it is actually possible for a human being to achieve Batman status through training.

== Synopsis ==
In the book Zehr goes over the amount of physical training that would be necessary for someone to become Batman. Zehr draws upon his knowledge as a neuroscientist, kinesiologist, and martial artist to do this, and covers topics such as what it would be like to fight in a superhero uniform as well as what a person's daily dietary requirements would be. Becoming Batman is unique in its explicit analysis of whether or not it is actually possible for a human being to achieve Batman status through training.

== Reception ==
The Guardian gave a mostly positive review for Becoming Batman, remarking that Zehr's " grasp of Chinese martial arts is somewhat loose, but the physiological material is fascinating and well explained." Publishers Weekly also gave a positive review, remarking that the book would have an obvious appeal to fans of Batman.

== Broader Impact ==
Zehr's work has also had a reciprocal impact on the way the comics are viewed and even written, providing reference material regarding the “physical reality of Batman” as recognized by Scottish Batman, Incorporated writer Grant Morrison. More recently, because of Becoming Batman, media articles discussing Batman and the DC Universe have included commentary by Zehr as a relevant authority, or referred to ideas from his book, weaving his scientific perspective into the Batman conversation.
