= Surf's Up (video game) =

2007 video game

- European Wii version cover art
- Developers: Ubisoft Montreal (PC, consoles); Ubisoft Quebec (PSP, DS, GBA)
- Publisher: Ubisoft
- Engine: Unreal Engine 2 (PC, consoles)
- Platforms: Game Boy Advance; GameCube; Mac OS X; Microsoft Windows; Nintendo DS; PlayStation 2; PlayStation 3; PlayStation Portable; Wii; Xbox 360
- Release: NA: May 29, 2007; EU: August 3, 2007; AU: August 30, 2007; AU: September 6, 2007 (X360); GameCube: NA: May 29, 2007
- Genre: Sports
- Modes: Single-player, multiplayer

Surf's Up is a video game based on the Sony Pictures Animation CGI-animated film of the same name. Surf's Up the video game follows the basic story of Cody Maverick in the movie. The game was developed by Ubisoft Montreal for Windows, Mac OS X, PlayStation Portable, PlayStation 3, Xbox 360, GameCube, PlayStation 2, and Wii. Three individually distinct versions exist.

The game features Shia LaBeouf, Jeff Bridges, Zooey Deschanel, Mario Cantone, Diedrich Bader, and Sal Masekela reprise their roles from the movie.

== Gameplay ==
Surf's Up is a surfing style game (using mechanics often seen in most skateboarding video games) set at the annual "Reggie Belafonte Big Z Memorial Surf Off" as seen in the film. Players choose from one of 10 characters from the film to play as (including Elliot from Open Season), and experience various spots on Pen Gu Island, from North Beach, to the Boneyards, as well as Cody's home of Shiverpool as they progress in the contest.

The player is given a set of objectives to meet in each match, including finding and collecting a set number of trophies scattered throughout the level, gaining enough points from performing tricks while surfing, and maneuvering through large gates. Each course has a large wave on either the left or right side of the screen that follows the player throughout, allowing the surfer to ride up and perform a trick as well as to garner speed for certain obstacles and ramps.

== Reception ==
Reception

Aggregate scores
Aggregator	Score								
Aggregator	DS	GBA	GameCube	PC	PS2	PS3	PSP	Wii	Xbox 360
GameRankings	55%	45%	62%	60.75%	58.25%	58.37%	55%	66.82%	62.42%
Metacritic	56/100	45/100	62/100	62/100	60/100	59/100	55/100	64/100	61/100

Review scores
Publication	Score								
Publication	DS	GBA	GameCube	PC	PS2	PS3	PSP	Wii	Xbox 360
Eurogamer									7/10
Game Informer				6.5/10		6.5/10		6.5/10	6.5/10
GameSpot	6.5/10	4.5/10	6.2/10	6.5/10	6.2/10	6.2/10	5.5/10	6.2/10	6.2/10
IGN	5.5/10					6.2/10			6.2/10
Nintendo Power								6/10	
Official Nintendo Magazine								73%	
Official Xbox Magazine (US)									5.5/10
PC Gamer (UK)				61%					
PlayStation: The Official Magazine						4/10			
TeamXbox									5.4/10

The game was met with average to poor reception. GameRankings and Metacritic gave it a score of 66.82% and 64 out of 100 for the Wii version; 62.42% and 61 out of 100 for the Xbox 360 version; 62% and 62 out of 100 for the GameCube version; 60.75% and 62 out of 100 for the PC version; 58.37% and 59 out of 100 for the PlayStation 3 version; 58.25% and 60 out of 100 for the PlayStation 2 version; 55% and 56 out of 100 for the DS version; 55% and 55 out of 100 for the PSP version; and 45% and 45 out of 100 for the Game Boy Advance version.
