= Jill Culton =

American animator, director and screenwriter

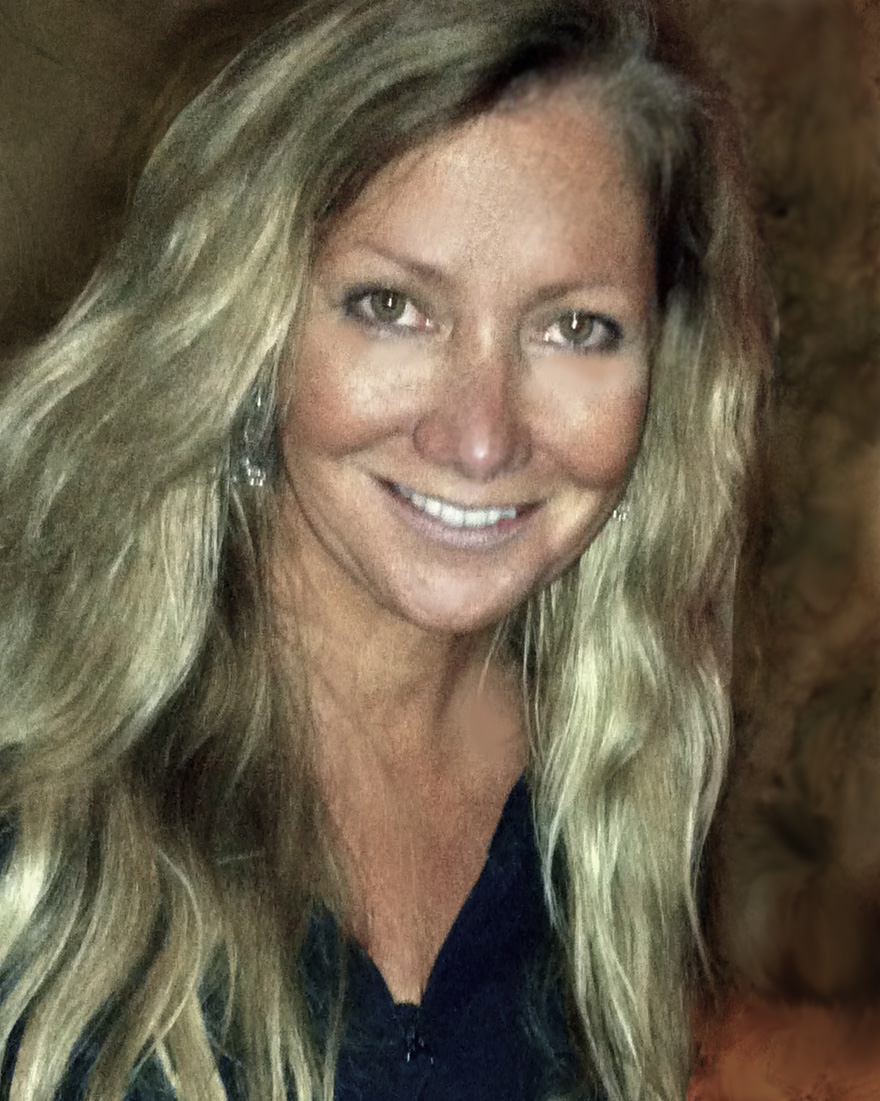
- Culton in 2010
- Education: California Institute of the Arts
- Occupations: Film director; executive producer; writer; animator; character designer; storyboard artist
- Years active: 1993–present
- Employers: Pixar Animation Studios (1993–2003); Sony Pictures Animation (2003–2009); DreamWorks Animation (2010–2024); Warner Bros. Pictures Animation (2024–present)
- Notable work: Monsters, Inc. Open Season; Abominable

Jill Culton is an American animator, storyboard artist, director, and screenwriter. With her directorial debut on Sony Pictures Animation's first animated film, Open Season, she became the first female principal director of a big budget, computer-generated feature film.

== Education and career ==
Previously, she studied at the Character Animation program at the California Institute of the Arts, where she later taught animation.

She was also a storyboard artist for various Pixar films such as Toy Story, Toy Story 2, A Bug's Life and also co-wrote the original treatment for Monsters, Inc., and continued to become the Head of Development.

She animated on Toy Story and served as a Directing Animator at Turner Features for the film Cats Don't Dance.

Along with Anthony Stacchi, she helped to develop Curious George while working at Industrial Light & Magic.

In 2003, Culton joined Sony Pictures Animation, which launched a year before to produce CG animated films. During her years at Sony, Culton, along with directing Open Season and executive producing Open Season 2, also developed Hotel Transylvania.

As of 2010, Culton was at DreamWorks Animation. For some time, she was writing and directing an animated film (now titled Abominable) about a little girl and a Yeti, tentatively titled Everest, but by 2016, she had left the project. However, in 2018, she came back to the project to write and direct once again.

In June 2024, it was announced that Culton would serve as the co-director of Warner Bros. Pictures Animation's adaptation of Oh, the Places You'll Go!.

== Filmography ==
- The Princess and the Cobbler (1993) (animator: Calvert/Cobbler Productions)
- Toy Story (1995) (story artist)
- Cats Don't Dance (1997) (supervising animator: Supporting Animal Characters, storyboard artist)
- A Bug's Life (1998) (additional storyboard artist)
- Toy Story 2 (1999) (character designer: new characters, story artist)
- Shrek (2001) (story artist)
- Monsters, Inc. (2001) (story, story supervisor, visual development)
- Open Season (2006) (director, story)
- Boog and Elliot's Midnight Bun Run (2006) (director, writer)
- Surf's Up (2007) (special thanks)
- Open Season 2 (2009) (executive producer)
- Shrek Forever After (2010) (special thanks, character designer: new characters, story artist)
- Abominable (2019) (director, writer)
- Oh, the Places You'll Go! (2028) (co-director)
