= Donny Lucas =

Canadian actor

- Born: Donald James Lucas; Montreal, Quebec, Canada
- Education: Pinner County Grammar School
- Occupations: Actor; comedian
- Height: 5 ft 8 in (1.73 m)

Donald James "Donny" Lucas is a Canadian actor and comedian.

He is best known for voicing Disco Kid in Punch Out!!, Zed in League of Legends, Mr. Fix in Iron Man: Armored Adventures, and the Lucius Fox A.I. in Batwoman.

== Early life ==
Donny Lucas was born, adopted, and raised in Montreal, Quebec.

Lucas started his acting career in 1986 by taking classes, workshops, and community theater. His first credits were for HBO, Warner Bros, and Nickelodeon.

== Filmography ==
=== Film ===
Year	Title	Role	Notes
1987	First Offender		Television film
1991	If Looks Could Kill	French Club	Credited as Donny James Lucas
1993	Vendetta II: The New Mafia	Jamaican Don	Television film; credited as Donny James Lucas
1995	For a Few Lousy Dollars	Theo	
1998	The Vigil	Nick	
2000	Tempting Fate	Owen	Short; credited as Donny James Lucas
2001	Love and Treason	Computer Tech	Television film
2001	Trapped	Karl	Television film
2001	Bones	Crackhead	
2002	Strange Frequency 2	Hippie Guitarist	Television film (segment: "Soul Man")
2004	Desolation: A Comedy		Credited as Donny James Lucas
2004	Human Nature	Harry	Direct-to-video
2006	Like Mike 2: Streetball	Chauffeur	Direct-to-video
2006	Hell Hath No Fury	Cowboy	Direct-to-video (segment: "Night Shift at the Coffee Shop")
2007	Ashes Fall	Bleeding Man	Short
2007	Wind Chill	Stranger	
2007	Numb	ER Doctor	
2007	They Wait	Sam's Doctor	
2008	Vice	Milo	
2008	Soulstice	Sol	Direct-to-video
2009	Hardwired	Bennett	Direct-to-video
2014	Asterix: The Mansions of the Gods	Flaturtha	Voice, English dub
2015	Signed, Sealed, Delivered: Truth Be Told	Staff Member	Television film
2015	Open Season: Scared Silly	Boog	Voice, direct-to-video; replacing Matthew J. Munn
2016	Anything for Love	Stan	Television film
2016	Ganjy	Cecil	Short
2017	Beaches	Mr. Whitney	Television film
2018	Midnight Sun	Recording Engineer	
2018	Henchmen	Brutus	Voice
2020	Tales from the Hood 3	Paul Bradford	

=== Television ===
Year	Title	Role	Notes
1990	Are You Afraid of the Dark?	Punk	Episode: "The Tale of the Twisted Claw"
1991	Heritage Minutes	Josh	Episode: "Underground Railroad"
1993	Scoop II	Cambrioleur	Episode: "Episode #2.1"
1995	Sirens	Darnel	Episode: "The Witness"; credited as Donny James Lucas
1996	Strange Luck	Production Assistant	Episode: "Healing Hands"
1997	The X-Files	Hyperbaric Technician	Episode: "Emily"
1997	Millennium	Balthazar	Episode: "Midnight of the Century"
1998	The Outer Limits	Hornet	Episode: "Black Box"
1999	First Wave	Franklin Garver	Episode: "Deepthroat"
1999	Aftershock: Earthquake in New York	Paramedic	2 episodes
2000-2001	Da Vinci's Inquest	Eric / Paul	2 episodes
2000	Dark Angel	Paramedic	Episode: "Blah Blah Woof Woof"
2001	Strange Frequency	Hippie Guitarist	Episode: "Soul Man"
2001	MythQuest	Mali	Episode: "The Blessing"
2002	Jeremiah	Preacher	Episode: "To Sail Beyond the Stars"
2002	John Doe	Passenger #2	Episode: "Manifest Destiny"
2003	The Twilight Zone	Phil	Episode: "Developing"
2003	Smallville	Morgan Edge's Black Thug	Episode: "Exile"
2004	The L Word	Director	Episode: "Luck, Next Time"
2005	The Dead Zone	Agent #1	Episode: "Broken Circle"
2007	Masters of Science Fiction	Steve	Episode: "The Discarded"
2007	Tin Man	Vy-Sor	3 episodes
2008	The Triple Eight	Ten	Episode: "Faith Off"
2009-2012	Iron Man: Armored Adventures	Mr. Fix	Voice, recurring role
2010	Human Target	Detective	Episode: "Baptiste"
2010	Maryoku Yummy	Tapo Tapo	Voice, 6 episodes
2011	The Killing	Immigration Officer	Episode: "Stonewalled"
2012	Fringe	Orderly Sam	Episode: "A Better Human Being"
2013-2014	Rogue	Bank Employee / Danyon	2 episodes
2014	Arrow	Customs Agent	Episode: "Heir to the Demon"
2015	Backstrom	Eric Ashby	Episode: "Bogeyman"
2016	Second Chance	FBI Agent #1	Episode: "Scratch That Glitch"
2016	Once Upon a Time	Sad-Eyed Man	Episode: "Our Decay"
2015-2016	Wayward Pines	True Believer #2 / Victor	8 episodes
2016	Legends of Tomorrow	Time Master Captain #4	Episode: "Destiny"
2017	Frequency	Deputy	Episode: "Harmonic"
2017	iZombie	Patrolman Bill	Episode: "Some Like It Hot Mess"
2017	Zoo	Ronald Kasak	Episode: "No place like home"
2017	Van Helsing	Chad Johnson	2 episodes
2017	Loudermilk	Lawyer	Episodes: "It's All About the Beans"
2018	Legends of Tomorrow	Shopkeeper	Episode: "Amazing Grace"
2019	Supernatural	Show Owner	Episode: "Lebanon"
2021	Batwoman	Garrett Hang	Episode: "Gore on Canvas"
2021	The Flash	Chip Cooper	2 episodes
2021	Batwoman	Lucius Fox A.I.	Voice, recurring role

=== Videogames ===
Year	Title	Role	Notes
2009	Punch-Out!! (Wii)	Disco Kid	
2009	League of Legends	Zed	
2011	Dead Rising 2: Off the Record	TK Thugs	Credited as Donnie Lucas
