= Inventing Iron Man =

2011 book by E. Paul Zehr

Inventing Iron Man: The Possibility of a Human Machine
- Author: E. Paul Zehr
- Language: English
- Subject: Physiology, Cyborgs, and Superhero comics
- Genre: Non-fiction
- Publisher: Johns Hopkins University Press
- Publication date: 2011
- Publication place: Canada
- Media type: Print (Hardcover)
- Pages: 206
- ISBN: 978-1-4214-0226-0
- OCLC: 701493121
- Dewey Decimal: 629.8 22

Inventing Iron Man: The Possibility of a Human Machine is a popular science book published in 2011 by neuroscience professor, martial arts master, and long-time comic-book reader E. Paul Zehr. By looking at current technology, as well as how the human body and nervous system would have to adapt, Zehr applies scientific principles and creativity to explore the feasibility of Iron Man as a reality.

== Synopsis ==
In the book, Zehr physically deconstructs Iron Man, analyzing how we could use modern-day technology to create a suit of armor similar to the one made by Tony Stark. The book makes a direct, parallel comparison of comic book science fiction with modern science. Zehr expresses that while science may be nearing a point where a suit like Iron Man's could be made, it is important to consider limitations of the human body itself. Inventing Iron Man scientifically examines the brain-machine interface, bringing together concepts in neuroscience and neuroplasticity.

== See also ==
- E. Paul Zehr
