= Herbert Brook Workman =

- Born: 1862; Peckham, London
- Died: 1951 (aged 88–89)

Herbert Brook Workman (1862–1951) was a leading Methodist and secretary of the Wesleyan Methodist Secondary Schools Trust when they took over Elmfield College in 1928.

Workman was born in London and educated at Kingswood School and Owens College, Manchester. He entered the Wesleyan ministry in 1885 and served as a circuit minister in England and Scotland until 1903 when he was appointed principal of Westminster College. In 1930 he was elected president of the Wesleyan Conference.

A distinguished historian, Workman was Cole Lecturer at Vanderbilt University in Tennessee in 1916 and temporary professor of Methodist Church history at the University of Chicago in 1927. He published extensively in the field of medieval church history as well as Methodism.

Workman's nickname was "Prinny" and as he was a key figure in the closure of Elmfield College, he came in for some satire when the closure was announced: several angry teachers at Elmfield drew a satirical coat-of-arms on the blackboard in the shape of an upturned dustbin with Dr Workman's legs protruding over the motto "Prinny suncus tiperi ashes" (Booth: 40).

== Publications of H.B. Workman ==
- 1886?: Persecution in the Early Church
- 1898 & 1912: The Church of the West in the Middle Ages
- 1901: The Dawn of the Reformation, Vols 1 & 2
- 1904: The Letters of John Hus (with Robert Martin Pope)
- 1906: Persecution in the Early Church: a chapter in the history of renunciation
- 1908: Recent Light on the New Testament
- 1909: A New History of Methodism (with illustrations and a bibliography by William John Townsend, George Eayrs)
- 1910: The Martyrs of the Early Church
- 1911: Christian Thought to the Reformation
- 1912, 1917 Methodism
- 1913: The Evolution Of The Monastic Ideal From The Earliest Times Down To The Coming Of The Friars
- 1913, 1915 The Martyrs of the Early Church
- 1916: The Foundation of Modern Religion: A Study in the Task and the Contribution of the Medieval Church (The Cole lectures of 1916 delivered before Vanderbilt University)
- 1921: The Place of Methodism in the Catholic Church
- 1926: John Wyclif: A study of the Medieval Church
- 1929: Wyclif Select English Writings (with Herbert E. Winn)
- 1936: John Wesley and Education by Alfred H. Body. Foreword By H.B. Workman
- 1960: Persecution in the Early Church

== Sources ==
- Encyclopedia of World Methodism (1974)
