= Open Season: Scared Silly =

- Home video release poster
- Directed by: David Feiss
- Screenplay by: Carlos Kotkin
- Story by: Steve Barr; David Feiss; Stephan Franck; Paul McEvoy; John Norton; Kris Pearn
- Based on: Characters by Steve Moore; John B. Carls; Jill Culton; Anthony Stacchi
- Produced by: John Bush
- Starring: Donny Lucas; Will Townsend; Melissa Sturm; Trevor Devall; Garry Chalk; Kathleen Barr
- Edited by: Maurissa Horwitz
- Music by: Rupert Gregson-Williams; Dominic Lewis
- Production company: Sony Pictures Animation
- Distributed by: Sony Pictures Home Entertainment
- Release dates: December 18, 2015 (Turkey); March 8, 2016 (United States)
- Running time: 84 minutes
- Country: United States
- Language: English
- Budget: $5.5 million
- Box office: $1.8 million

Open Season: Scared Silly, also known as Open Season 4, is a 2015 American animated comedy film produced by Sony Pictures Animation. The fourth and final installment in the Open Season franchise, it features the voices of Donny Lucas, Will Townsend, and Melissa Sturm.

The film was directed by David Feiss, with music by Rupert Gregson-Williams and Dominic Lewis. Feiss had previously worked on the first film in 2006, serving as its head of story. The film premiered theatrically in Turkey on December 18, 2015, and was released direct-to-video in North America on March 8, 2016. It received mixed to negative reviews and grossed $1.8 million at the box office.

== Plot ==
Elliot tells a campfire story about the legend of the Wailing Wampus Werewolf that is said to live in the Timberline National Forest one night. Boog is terrified by the story and decides to "chicken out" of their annual camping trip until he knows that the werewolf is gone. Determined to help Boog overcome his fears, Elliot, Mr. Weenie, and the other woodland animals band together to scare the fear out of Boog and uncover the mystery of the Wailing Wampus Werewolf.

Former hunter Shaw, now a tour guide, returns to Timberline to get revenge on Boog and Elliot for defeating him in the first film and witnesses an unseen creature in the forest (which turns out to be Ian, a deer who is Elliot's rival, in a disguise). Shaw begs Sheriff Gordy to reopen hunting season and he reluctantly does so, but not before telling Shaw to only hunt down the werewolf. Despite this, Shaw becomes determined to not only catch it, but also hunt down Boog and Elliot. To carry out his plan, Shaw recruits his old friends Ed and Edna, the owners of poutine restaurant Poutine Palace. Meanwhile, a heartbroken Elliot catches the werewolf by himself after Boog angrily breaks off his friendship with him. As Boog walks through the forest, Elliot's wife Giselle catches up to him and tries to convince him that Elliot was trying to help him overcome his fear and that Elliot is headed toward Dead Bear Gulch, but fails.

Meanwhile, a starving Mr. Weenie starts to believe that he is the werewolf. At Dead Bear Gulch, Elliot and Mr. Weenie are both caught by the werewolf, who is actually Shaw in a costume; fortunately, Boog and his friends leap to the rescue. Shaw is eventually overpowered and defeated as he, Ed and Edna are arrested by Gordy, who permanently shuts down open season. Gordy meets up with Boog, having recognized the bear's handiwork in defeating Shaw, and rewards him with a few treats. The animals then discover that the werewolf is real, but Elliot befriends him by dancing with him as he joins their campout. The next morning, Bobbie and Bob happily return to their RV with Mr. Weenie, and Bobbie tells Mr. Weenie that today is his birthday. The werewolf asks Boog to wear the female werewolf costume one more time, but Boog angrily refuses.

== Cast ==
- Donny Lucas as Boog
- Will Townsend as Elliot / Mr. Weenie
- Melissa Sturm as Giselle
- Trevor Devall as Shaw / The Wailing Wampus Werewolf / Deputy #1
- Kathleen Barr as Edna / Bobbie / Tree-Hugger Lady
- Garry Chalk as Ed
- Brian Drummond as Ian / Reilly / Tree-Hugger Man
- Lee Tockar as Buddy / McSquizzy / Deputy #2
- Shannon Chan-Kent as Rosie / Marcia
- Michelle Murdocca as Maria
- Lorne Cardinal as Sheriff Gordy
- Peter Kelamis as Serge

== Production ==
Open Season: Scared Silly was first announced on June 11, 2015. The first trailer was released on November 1, 2015.

== Release ==
=== Home media ===
The film was released on DVD and Blu-ray in the United States and Canada on March 8, 2016, by Sony Pictures Home Entertainment.

== Reception ==
Renee Schonfeld from Common Sense Media gave it a positive review, saying, "Talented voice actors, along with a clever story and script, make this very funny film a cut above most direct-to-DVD fare for kids and families". The film was overall deemed as an improvement over its predecessor. The film received 33% on rotten tomatoes.
