= Open Season (2006 film) =

2006 film by Roger Allers and Jill Culton

- Theatrical release poster
- Directed by: Jill Culton; Roger Allers
- Screenplay by: Steve Bencich; Ron J. Friedman; Nat Mauldin
- Story by: Jill Culton; Anthony Stacchi; Steve Moore (Note: Moore and Carls are credited for providing the original story of the film.); John B. Carls
- Produced by: Michelle Murdocca
- Starring: Martin Lawrence; Ashton Kutcher; Debra Messing; Gary Sinise
- Edited by: Pamela Ziegenhagen-Shefland
- Music by: Paul Westerberg; Ramin Djawadi
- Production companies: Columbia Pictures; Sony Pictures Animation
- Distributed by: Sony Pictures Releasing
- Release dates: September 25, 2006 (Greek Theatre); September 29, 2006 (United States); October 13, 2006 (United Kingdom)
- Running time: 86 minutes
- Country: United States
- Language: English
- Budget: $85 million
- Box office: $200.8 million

Open Season is a 2006 American animated adventure comedy film directed by Jill Culton and Roger Allers and written by Nat Mauldin, Steve Bencich, and Ron J. Friedman. Produced by Sony Pictures Animation as its debut film, it features the voices of Martin Lawrence, Ashton Kutcher, Debra Messing, and Gary Sinise. The film follows Boog (Lawrence), a domesticated grizzly bear, who is let go into the woods, and teams up with a one-antlered mule deer named Elliot (Kutcher) to get back home before open season starts.

Open Season premiered at the Greek Theatre on September 25, 2006, and was released in theaters in the United States on September 29 by Sony Pictures Releasing. The film received mixed reviews from critics and grossed $201 million against an $85 million budget. The first in the Open Season franchise, it was followed by Open Season 2 (2008), Open Season 3 (2010), and Open Season: Scared Silly (2015). A video game based on the film was released, and a television series, Open Season: Call of Nature, was released in 2023.

== Plot ==
In a small town called Timberline, a domesticated grizzly bear named Boog lives with his adoptive caretaker, a park ranger named Beth, who has raised him since he was a cub, and spends his days as the star attraction of the town's nature show. One day, hunting fanatic Shaw drives into Timberline with a one-antlered mule deer named Elliot tied to the hood of his truck and is interviewed, despite denying that he intentionally ran over Elliot with his truck. After Beth confronts Shaw, Boog frees Elliot, who becomes convinced that they are friends, and that night, Elliot finds Boog sleeping in the garage and convinces him to sneak out, and the two end up raiding PuniMart, a local convenience store in town. Eventually, Elliot runs away while Boog is caught by Gordy, the town's sheriff and Beth's best friend, who returns Boog to Beth and tells her that Boog's feral instincts may be emerging and it may be time to release Boog into the wild.

The next morning, Elliot is being pursued by Shaw, and goes to Boog for help at the nature show. Boog tries to get rid of him, but the audience mistakes him for attacking Elliot and goes into a panic. Beth tranquilizes them both just before Shaw fires his own gun and then runs away before Gordy can arrest him, and, taking Gordy's advice, Beth relocates Boog and Elliot into the Timberline National Forest two days before open season. They are relocated above the waterfalls, where they will be legally safe from hunters.

Boog is initially outraged to have lost his home, but lacking outdoor survival skills, he reluctantly takes Elliot as his guide to get him back home to reunite with Beth. They encounter unwelcoming forest animals, including a Scottish-accented squirrel named McSquizzy and his gang of fellow acorn-throwing squirrels, beaver Reilly and his team of construction workers, and Elliot's estranged herd, led by Ian, and Giselle, a doe that Elliot has a crush on. Eventually, Boog and Elliot start to bond after realizing they're both outcasts, and Boog considers letting Elliot stay with him when they get back home.

The next day, Boog realizes that Elliot has no clue where they are going after reencountering Reilly's beavers. The two were suddenly confronted by Shaw and, in an attempt to get away, accidentally destroyed Reilly's dam, causing a flood that sent the animals and Shaw plummeting down the waterfall into the hunting grounds. At first, everyone blames Boog for getting them lost. Elliot tries to defend him, but when Boog discovers that Elliot lied about knowing the way back to keep them together, he ends their friendship and angrily storms off, only to find himself at Shaw's log cabin. Upon discovering Shaw's taxidermy collection and Shaw returning and discovering him, Boog narrowly escapes and finds a nearby road leading back to Timberline. Realizing the danger the animals are in and seeing a few hunters pass by in their trucks, Boog returns to the woods, reconciles with Elliot, and rallies the animals to defend themselves against the hunters. They scavenge supplies from an RV owned by a traveling couple named Bob and Bobbie, who are looking for Bigfoot, while their pet dachshund, Mr. Weenie, joins the forest animals.

The next day, Boog leads a revolution against the hunters, ending with them running away after McSquizzy blows up their trucks with a large propane tank. While the animals celebrate, Shaw returns for a showdown with Boog, but before he can shoot Boog, Elliot throws himself in front of Boog and takes the shot, prompting an enraged Boog to tie Shaw up with his own gun. Afterwards, Boog discovers that Elliot survived, only losing his other remaining antler. The forest animals thank Boog for his help and continue celebrating their victory by taking out their vengeance on Shaw by smothering him with honey and pillow feathers, sending him fleeing into the woods. Beth returns in a helicopter to take Boog back home, but, having learned to appreciate his new home, he decides to stay in the forest with Beth's blessing.

In a pre-credits scene, Shaw, still tarred and feathered, emerges from the woods that night, and gets run over by Bob and Bobbie, who mistake him for Bigfoot and ties him to the roof of their RV.

== Voice cast ==
- Martin Lawrence as Boog, a 900-pound pampered smooth-talking male grizzly bear.
- Ashton Kutcher as Elliot, a cheerful but oblivious mule deer buck who got his antler broken off after Shaw deliberately ran him over.
- Debra Messing as Beth, a park ranger who had raised Boog since he was a cub.
- Gary Sinise as Shaw, the nastiest hunter in Timberline, Boog and Elliot's arch-nemesis, and Beth's arch-rival.
- Billy Connolly as McSquizzy, the grumpy elderly leader of a clan of eastern gray squirrels with a Scottish accent.
- Jon Favreau as Reilly, a diligent North American beaver.
- Georgia Engel as Bobbie, a friendly but dim-witted hippie woman who is Mr. Weenie’s owner.
  - Bobbie’s husband, Bob, has no dialogue.
- Jane Krakowski as Giselle, a beautiful mule deer doe and Elliot's love interest.
- Patrick Warburton as Ian, a large, intimidating mule deer stag, the alpha of his herd and Elliot's arch-rival.
- Gordon Tootoosis as Gordy, Timberline's sheriff and a long-time friend of Beth's.
- Cody Cameron as Mr. Weenie, Bob and Bobbie’s domesticated German-accented dachshund.
- Danny Mann as Serge, a French-accented mallard duck.
- Maddie Taylor as:
  - Deni, a mute and insane but brave mallard duck and Serge's brother.
  - Buddy, a blue North American porcupine who searches for friends.
- Nika Futterman as Rosie, a striped skunk with a Mexican accent.
- Michelle Murdocca as Maria, a striped skunk who is Rosie's identical twin.
- Fergal Reilly as O'Toole, a beaver and one of Reilly's men.

== Production ==
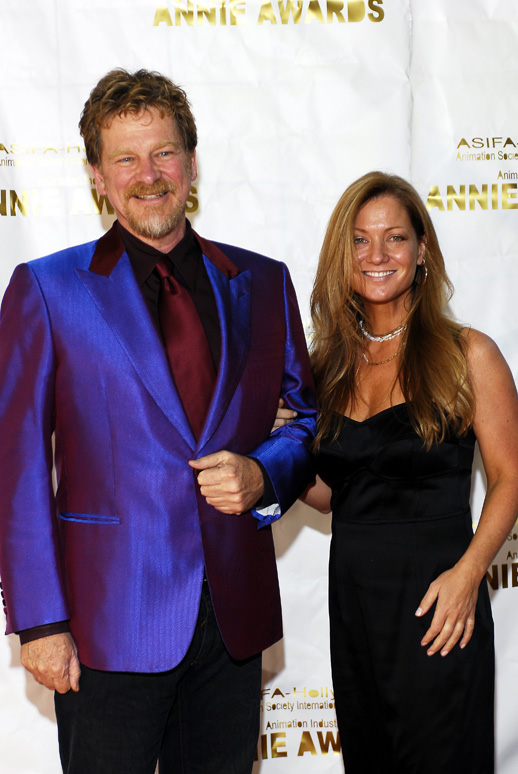
Roger Allers and Jill Culton, the directors of the film, at the 34th Annie Awards

The ideas for Open Season came from cartoonist Steve Moore, who is known for his comic strip In the Bleachers. Moore and producer John Carls submitted the story to Sony in June 2002, and the film immediately went into development. On February 29, 2004, Sony Pictures Animation announced the beginning of the production on Open Season, its first CGI-animated film.

The film location was inspired by the towns of Sun Valley, Idaho and McCall, Idaho, and the Sawtooth National Forest. References to the Lawn Lake, Colorado, Dam flood, Longs Peak, and other points of interest in the area are depicted in the film.

The rendering services used were Hewlett-Packard and Alias Maya.

The Sony animation team developed a digital tool called shapers that allowed the animators to reshape the character models into stronger poses and silhouettes and subtle distortions such as squash, stretch, and smears, typical of traditional, hand drawn animation.

To choose the voice cast, Culton blindly listened to audition tapes, unknowingly picking Lawrence and Kutcher for the lead roles. Their ability to improvise significantly contributed to the creative process. "They really became meshed with the characters", said Culton. Until the film's premiere, Lawrence and Kutcher never met during production.

== Reception ==
=== Critical response ===
On the review aggregator website Rotten Tomatoes, 48% of 102 critics' reviews are positive, with an average rating of 5.4/10. The website's consensus reads: "Open Season is a cliched palette of tired jokes and CGI animal shenanigans that have been seen multiple times this cinematic year." Metacritic, which uses a weighted average, assigned the film a score of 49 out of 100, based on 18 critics, indicating "mixed or average" reviews. Audiences polled by CinemaScore gave the film an average grade of "A−" on an A+ to F scale.

Kevin Smith gave the film a thumbs up during an appearance as a guest critic on Ebert and Roeper, saying: "If your kids like poop jokes as much as I do, Open Season will put a big smile on their faces". However, Richard Roeper gave the film a thumbs down, saying, "It's just okay, the animation is uninspired".

=== Box office ===
Open Season opened number one with $23 million on its opening weekend. It grossed $88.6 million in the United States and $112.2 million in foreign countries, making $200.8 million worldwide. The film was released in the United Kingdom on October 13, 2006, and opened at number three, behind The Departed and The Devil Wears Prada.

=== Accolades ===
The film was nominated for six Annie Awards, including Best Animated Feature (losing to Cars), Best Animated Effects, Best Character Design in a Feature Production, Best Production Design in a Feature Production, and Best Storyboarding in a Feature Production.

== Home media ==
Open Season was released on DVD, Blu-ray, and UMD Video on January 30, 2007. It includes an animated short called Boog and Elliot's Midnight Bun Run. The film was later released to 3D Blu-ray on November 16, 2010.

== Video game ==
A video game based on the film was released on September 18, 2006, for PlayStation 2, Xbox, Xbox 360, Nintendo DS, GameCube, Game Boy Advance, PlayStation Portable, and Microsoft Windows. For Wii, it was released on November 19, 2006, together with the console's launch.

== Music ==
Open Season

Soundtrack album by Paul Westerberg
- Released: September 26, 2006
- Length: 41:29
- Label: Lost Highway
- Producers: Lou Giordano; Dana Gumbiner

Paul Westerberg chronology
The Resterberg (2005)	''Open Season'' (2006)	49:00... Of Your Time/Life (2008)

Chart (2009)	Peak
U.S. Billboard Top Soundtracks	#15

The soundtrack includes an original film score by Ramin Djawadi and several original songs by Paul Westerberg, formerly of The Replacements. Rolling Stone gave the film's soundtrack three stars out of five, as did AllMusic.

Open Season—Original Motion Picture Soundtrack (10″ LP) includes three songs that did not appear on the soundtrack CD: An alternative version of "I Belong", Paul Westerberg's own version of "Wild as I Wanna Be", and Reyli's "Tú eres el amor", which played during the credits in the Latin American Spanish dubbed version of the film. In the dubbing of the same language, Reyli also performed the voice of Boog.

The theme song of the Japanese version is called "Tookage" by Chemistry.

== Franchise ==
Open Season was followed by three direct-to-video sequels: Open Season 2 (2008), Open Season 3 (2010), and Open Season: Scared Silly (2015). A majority of the characters' voices were recast, with Michelle Murdocca (Maria) being the only cast member to appear in all sequels.

An animated series Open Season: Call of Nature was released in 2023.
