= Open Season 2 =

2008 American computer-animated comedy film

- Theatrical release poster
- Directed by: Matthew O'Callaghan
- Written by: David I. Stern
- Based on: Characters by Steve Moore
- Produced by: Kirk Bodyfelt; Matthew O'Callaghan
- Starring: Joel McHale; Mike Epps; Jane Krakowski; Billy Connolly; Crispin Glover
- Edited by: Steven Liu; Jimmy Sandoval
- Music by: Ramin Djawadi
- Production companies: Sony Pictures Animation; Reel FX Entertainment
- Distributed by: Sony Pictures Home Entertainment
- Release dates: September 24, 2008 (South Africa); January 27, 2009 (North America)
- Running time: 76 minutes
- Country: United States
- Language: English
- Box office: $8.7 million

Open Season 2 is a 2008 American animated comedy film and the second in the Open Season film series. It was directed by Matthew O'Callaghan. It premiered theatrically in South Africa on September 24, 2008, and was released direct-to-video in the United States on January 27, 2009. The film grossed $8.7 million worldwide and like its predecessor, received mixed reviews.

== Plot ==
In the spring, Elliot grows giant new antlers and is preparing to marry Giselle. However, an accident cracks his antlers, leaving him upset. Convinced the damage is a sign of bad luck and influenced by Ian’s words during the ceremony, Elliot begins having second thoughts. Meanwhile, Mr. Weenie follows a trail of dog biscuits left by his former owners. At the height of the wedding, Elliot sees Mr. Weenie being taken away by Bob and Bobbie. Misinterpreting Bobbie’s affectionate behavior as torture, Elliot spins an exaggerated tale for the other forest animals and launches a rescue mission to save Mr. Weenie, also using it as an excuse to delay marrying Giselle until his antlers grow back. Boog, Elliot, Giselle, McSquizzy, Buddy, Serge, and Deni join the mission under Boog’s leadership.

Meanwhile, the pets of Bob and Bobbie’s friends, traveling to Pet Paradiso—a resort for humans and their furry companions—meet up at a rest stop. Among them are Fifi, a Toy Poodle, his Basset Hound buddy Roberto, two cats named Stanley and Roger, and Rufus and Charlene, a pair of Southern dogs. Fifi discusses his hatred for wild animals, describing how he claims they got him shocked by a bug zapper. He then tries to maul a nearby rabbit, until he's stopped by his owner. Meanwhile, the wilds come across Weenie, much to Elliot’s annoyance. They attempt to free him while his owners take a break at a gas station. Though they manage to remove his chains, Elliot’s impulsive and clumsy nature causes them to accidentally leave him trapped in the RV with Buddy. After a heated argument, Giselle decides to leave Elliot so she can search for Mr. Weenie on her own, while Serge and Deni take to the skies to look for him.

The owners arrive at the pet camp with Mr. Weenie and Buddy, where the other pets greet Weenie. Fifi attempts to revert him to a domesticated state, but Weenie refuses. Buddy aids his escape and tries to remove his shock collar. During the chase, Fifi is shocked by the collar, singeing the fur on his forehead and driving him to madness, prompting him to vow revenge. Meanwhile, Serge and Deni return, claiming they found Weenie and Buddy at a pet camp, unaware they have already fled. Boog and the others establish their camp, but Boog fails to convince Giselle that Elliot is trustworthy and that they should be together. The wild animals discover they have arrived at Pet Paradiso. In the woods, Weenie and Buddy encounter Elliot and persuade him to go to Pet Paradiso to rescue their friends.

The wilds try to sneak into Pet Paradiso by disguising themselves as pets, with Giselle as a dalmatian and McSquizzy as a chihuahua. Boog attempts to sneak in as a cat, but proves to be too large to pass off as one. He then changes his disguise to a sheepdog. After Elliot, Mr. Weenie, and Buddy meet up with Boog, Elliot disguises himself as Boog’s human owner so they can sneak in. Meanwhile, Giselle and McSquizzy wander around Pet Paradiso searching for Mr. Weenie, but their cover is blown, and they’re captured by Fifi and the other pets, taken to a secret lair beneath the resort’s waterslide. Elliot, Buddy, and Mr. Weenie try to rescue them, but Mr. Weenie, longing to be a pet again, decides to play on the waterslide instead. This leaves the others, except Boog, to be captured by Fifi, while Boog chases after Mr. Weenie.

Fifi readies herself to take out everyone with a pile of shock collars. Meanwhile, Boog tries to stop Mr. Weenie from going down the waterslide, but his cover is blown, and security attempts to tranquilize him. Before Fifi can shock the wilds into submission, Elliot, finally trusting himself more than his antlers, attempts to confess his love to Giselle, only for her to berate him for leaving her at the altar and blaming everything on Mr. Weenie’s “kidnapping.” Just as Fifi is about to finish them off, Boog crashes into the lair via the waterslide, unleashing a surge of water that sweeps everyone outside.

A battle between the wilds and pets ensues, with the Pet Paradiso security focused on tranquilizing the wilds. While Boog tricks security into tranquilizing themselves, Elliot saves Giselle, accidentally placing all the shock collars on himself. He wrestles Fifi in the pool for the shock collar remote; Fifi eventually grabs the remote and activates the collars, only to realize that Elliot has attached them to him. Fifi survives the electrocution but loses his remaining fur, humiliating him further. The pets and the wilds settle their differences and decide to become friends. Mr. Weenie, wanting to be a pet again, decides to join the pets and returns to his owners in joy. Returning to the woods, Elliot finally professes his true feelings for Giselle, and they get married.

== Cast ==
- Joel McHale as Elliot, a mule deer who is Boog's best friend and the main protagonist of the film who was supposed to marry Giselle but abandoned her due to his new emotions.
- Mike Epps as Boog, a grizzly bear who is Elliot's best friend and leads the rescue mission to save Mr. Weenie.
- Cody Cameron as Mr. Weenie, a German dachshund who was captured by Fifi and the pets, causing Boog, Elliot, and the other wilds to rescue him.
- Georgia Engel as Bobbie, Mr. Weenie's woman owner
- Jane Krakowski as Giselle, Elliot's fiancée who is scared of getting married.
- Billy Connolly as McSquizzy, a Scottish squirrel who joins in the mission to save Weenie.
- Crispin Glover as Fifi, an ill-tempered toy poodle and the main antagonist of the film who is often annoyed by his companion, Roberto. Fifi has a deep hatred over wild animals and slowly begins to lose his sanity after his forehead gets burned during a chase.
- Maddie Taylor as Deni/Buddy/Ian. Deni is a mallard, and Buddy is a blue North American porcupine. Except for Ian, who is the leader of the mule deer herd, they join in the mission to save Mr. Weenie.
- Steve Schirripa as Roberto, a Basset Hound, and Fifi's dim-witted friend who usually annoys him.
- Fred Stoller as Stanley, a cat who is constantly annoyed by Roger.
- Sean Mullen as Roger, an intellectually disabled cat who often annoys his best friend Stanley.
- Diedrich Bader as Rufus, a Southern-accented Airedale Terrier who is Charlene's boyfriend.
- Olivia Hack as Charlene, a Southern-accented Cocker Spaniel who is Rufus' girlfriend.

== Production ==
Sony announced a sequel to Open Season in September 2007. Although the original grossed $85.1 million in the United States and $115.7 million in foreign countries, Sony felt the film performed much better on DVD, thus, making a direct-to-DVD sequel. Sony Pictures Digital president said that "the studio will keep Open Season 2's costs low by utilizing Imageworks' satellite facilities in India and New Mexico".

== Release ==
Although Open Season 2 was released direct-to-video in the United States and the United Kingdom, it was released theatrically in some countries. In South Africa on its opening day, the film grossed $84,244 from 26 screens with a $2,081 average. In Russia, it opened with $2,835,600 from 360 screens with a $7,877 average. In Poland, it opened with $194,339 from 75 screens with a $2,591 average. In total, the film grossed $8,716,950.

== Reception ==
Critic at DVD Verdict claimed, "Open Season 2 is no classic (neither was the original), but it's a competent check-your-brain-at-the-door comedy for children of all ages. The animation and storytelling may not stack up against Pixar's (whose does?), but the flick offers something that Pixar movies generally don't: old cartoon slapstick and sight gags in the mold of Bugs Bunny".

== Home media ==
Open Season 2 was released on DVD, Blu-ray Disc and PSP UMD on January 27, 2009.

== Sequels ==
The sequel Open Season 3 premiered in theaters in Russia on October 21, 2010, and was released on DVD and Blu-ray in United States on January 25, 2011. Open Season: Scared Silly premiered in theaters in Turkey on December 18, 2015, and was released on DVD and Blu-ray in the United States and Canada on March 8, 2016. It serves as a standalone sequel, acknowledging the events of the original movie but not those of the second and third.
