= Surf's Up (film) =

2007 animated film by Ash Brannon and Chris Buck

- Theatrical release poster
- Directed by: Ash Brannon; Chris Buck
- Screenplay by: Don Rhymer; Ash Brannon; Chris Buck; Chris Jenkins
- Story by: Chris Jenkins; Christian Darren
- Produced by: Chris Jenkins
- Starring: Shia LaBeouf; Jeff Bridges; Zooey Deschanel; Jon Heder; James Woods
- Edited by: Ivan Bilancio
- Music by: Mychael Danna
- Production companies: Columbia Pictures; Sony Pictures Animation
- Distributed by: Sony Pictures Releasing (Note: Distributed under the Columbia Pictures banner.)
- Release date: June 8, 2007
- Running time: 85 minutes
- Country: United States
- Language: English
- Budget: $100 million
- Box office: $153 million

Surf's Up is a 2007 American animated mockumentary sports comedy film directed by Ash Brannon and Chris Buck, and written by Brannon, Buck, Don Rhymer and Chris Jenkins. Produced by Sony Pictures Animation, the film features the voices of Shia LaBeouf, Jeff Bridges, Zooey Deschanel, Jon Heder, and James Woods. It is a parody of surfing documentaries, such as The Endless Summer, Step into Liquid, and Riding Giants, with parts of the plot parodying North Shore. Real-life surfers Kelly Slater and Rob Machado have vignettes as their penguin surfer counterparts. To obtain the desired hand-held documentary feel, the film's animation team motion-captured a physical camera operator's moves.

Surf's Up was released in the United States on June 8, 2007, by Sony Pictures Releasing, and received generally positive reviews from critics, with praise for the animation, humor and unique mockumentary setup. The film grossed $152 million against a budget of $100 million, and was nominated for Best Animated Feature at the 80th Academy Awards. A sequel, Surf's Up 2: WaveMania, was released in 2017. A TV series is in development at Atomic Cartoons.

== Plot ==
Teenage northern rockhopper penguin Cody Maverick, living in Shiverpool, Antarctica, with his mother Edna and older brother Glen, has dreamed of becoming a professional surfer ever since meeting the famous surfer emperor penguin Zeke "Big Z" Topanga many years ago. Talent scout shorebird Michael Abromowitz arrives in Shiverpool to find entrants for the Big Z Memorial surfing competition on Pen-Gu Island. Poor conditions mean Cody is unable to show off his skills, but, determined, he catches up to the whale Mikey's team travel on and convinces Mikey to let him enter the contest. En route to Pen-Gu Island, Cody befriends another entrant, Chicken Joe, a chill rooster surfer from Sheboygan, Wisconsin, who has much in common with Cody.

The entrants arrive at Pen-Gu Island, where Cody meets and immediately falls in love with Lani Aliikai, a female gentoo penguin who is a lifeguard. He also meets the mean-spirited king penguin Tank "The Shredder" Evans, who has won the competition nine times since its creation after Big Z's death a decade ago. Cody sees Tank vandalizing Big Z's memorial and furiously challenges him to a duel. Tank wins, while Cody nearly drowns and is stung by a sea urchin named Ivan, getting a poisonous spine stuck in his foot. Lani rescues him and takes him to Geek, a recluse who lives in a tree in the middle of the island, to help Cody recover from his injuries. Cody wakes up, but cannot find the souvenir necklace given to him by Big Z when he was young. Geek leaves Cody at the pathway leading back to the beach, then finds the necklace in his hut, but is hesitant on returning the accessory.

Cody is hesitant to return, still embarrassed by his earlier wipeout. While returning the necklace, Geek finds Cody sitting on a koa log and offers to help him make a surfboard, Cody's previous boards all having been made out of ice. They attempt to take the log back to Geek's house, only to lose control of it and end up on a beach far away from the house. When Cody gets to the beach, he discovers a shack full of old trophies and surfboards, which used to belong to Big Z. After observing Geek walking solemnly into the shack, he realizes that Geek is actually Big Z himself. Excited, Cody asks him to teach him how to surf. Big Z reluctantly agrees, but tells Cody he has to make his own board first.

The attempt goes disastrously, however, as an eager Cody refuses to listen to Big Z's advice and crafts a rough and unstable board that shatters upon hitting the water. Exasperated, Cody storms off and runs into Lani, who reveals that Big Z is her uncle, and Cody is eventually persuaded to return when Lani admits Cody is the only one who has been able to get Big Z out of his hut. Cody spends the night working patiently on a new board.

Big Z compliments Cody on his new board, and Cody is ready to start training. Big Z instead has him perform random tasks that are seemingly unrelated to surfing and pulls pranks on him. Finally, when Cody starts having fun and understanding the essence of surfing, Big Z finally surfs with him, and Cody learns to surf with a more patient approach. The evening before the contest, Cody asks Big Z if he will come to watch, but he refuses, revealing that he faked his death because he realized he couldn't compete with his then-new rival Tank, and can't bring himself to show his face in front of his fans as a loser. Upset that his own idol gave up, Cody throws the necklace into the sea, meets up with Joe, and gets back to the competition just as it begins.

Cody makes it to the finals, as do Tank and Joe. In the first wave, Tank battles with Cody, with Tank trying to knock him off his board, but Tank falls off his own board and does not score any points. During the final wave, however, Tank appears and tries to throw Joe off his board. Cody intervenes at the last minute, sending himself and Tank into an area of the beach known as the Boneyards, which consists of dangerously sharp rock outcroppings and has killed many surfers who have ventured there. Tank punches Cody off his board before crashing and is rescued by Lani. Big Z, who had secretly been watching Cody's performance, rescues Cody from a gigantic wave and helps him get back to the beach safely.

Big Z and Cody find out that Joe won by default since Tank and Cody were disqualified. However, Cody accepts the loss, having decided he would rather just have fun instead. Big Z reveals himself to the spectators and invites all of them to surf at his beach, where he joins Cody in tube-riding.

== Voice cast ==
- Shia LaBeouf as Cody Maverick, a 17-year-old rockhopper penguin who dreams of being a surfer.
- Jeff Bridges as Zeke "Big Z/Geek" Topanga, Cody's idol and a famous surfer emperor penguin.
- Zooey Deschanel as Lani Aliikai, a Gentoo penguin lifeguard, Big Z's niece, and Cody's love interest.
- Jon Heder as Chicken Joe, a friendly, airheaded rooster from Wisconsin and Cody's best friend.
- James Woods as Reggie Belafonte, an arrogant sea otter, the competition promoter.
- Diedrich Bader as Tank "The Shredder" Evans, a king penguin, Cody's rival and Big Z's arch-nemesis.
- Mario Cantone as Mikey Abromowitz, a talent scout shorebird.
- Kelly Slater as the penguin version of himself
- Rob Machado as the penguin version of himself
- Sal Masekela as himself
- Ash Brannon as himself
- Chris Buck as himself
- Dana Belben as Edna Maverick, a rockhopper penguin and Cody's mother.
- Brian Posehn as Glen Maverick, a rockhopper penguin and Cody's older brother.
- Reed Buck as Arnold
- Reese Elowe as Kate
- Jack P. Ranjo as Smudge
- Maddie Taylor as Ivan, a sea urchin

== Production ==
The idea for Surf's Up goes back to at least 2002. The film was a concept "four and a half years" before other penguin movies like Happy Feet came out. There was already a surfing penguin project in development at Sony, described as West Side Story meets Romeo + Juliet. Chris Jenkins said it wasn't a good idea, so the project died. He then re-presented the idea, but with a documentary angle. In 2004, Brannon and Buck were announced to be directing the film, with Quiksilver on board as a creative consultant. Kelly Slater and Rob Machado also gave the animators feedback on how the waves were animated. To add to the mockumentary feel, the voice actors were asked to do improv.

== Music ==
Surf's Up: Music from the Motion Picture

Soundtrack album by Various Artists
- Released: June 5, 2007
- Genres: Pop; rock; reggae; alternative rock
- Length: 50:17
- Label: Columbia

Surf's Up: Music from the Motion Picture was released on June 5, 2007. The following 14 songs are on the Sony's official film soundtrack.

No.	Title	Writer(s)	Artist	Length
1.	"Reggae Got Soul"	Frederick Hibbert, Warrick Lyn	311	3:09
2.	"Drive"	Alex Katunich, Brandon Boyd, Chris Kilmore, José Pasillas II, Michael Einziger	Incubus	3:52
3.	"Stand Tall"	Dustin Bushnell, Jared Watson, Stan Frazier, Steve Fox	Dirty Heads	3:11
4.	"Lose Myself"	Lauryn Hill	Lauryn Hill	4:35
5.	"Just Say Yes"	Ken Andrews	Ken Andrews	3:40
6.	"Forrowest"	Jorge Continentino, Mauro Refosco	Forro in the Dark	4:44
7.	"Pocket Full of Stars"	David Jones, Hayley Hutchinson, James Galley, Martin Cohen, Sam Forrest	Nine Black Alps	3:32
8.	"Into Yesterday"	Stan Frazier, Steve Fox	Sugar Ray	4:11
9.	"Big Wave"	Eddie Vedder, Jeff Ament	Pearl Jam	2:57
10.	"Wipe Out"	Robert Berryhill, James Fuller, Patrick Connolly, Ronald Wilson	The Queers	1:41
11.	"Run Home (Instrumental)"	Daniel Watchorn, Michael Dyball, Michel Heppner, Vincent Nudo	Priestess	3:37
12.	"What I Like About You"	Jimmy Marinos, Mike Skill, Walter Palamarchuk	The Romantics	2:57
13.	"You Get What You Give"	Gregg Alexander, Richard Knowels	New Radicals	4:57
14.	"Hawaiian War Chant (Ta-Hu-Wa-Hu-Wai)"	Leleiohaku, Ralph Freed	Bob Wills & His Texas Playboys	3:14
Total length:				50:17

According to the film's end credits, the version of "Wipe Out" heard in the film is performed by the punk band The Queers. The official soundtrack includes this version under the pseudonym "Big Nose", presumably for marketing purposes. Two songs by Green Day, "Welcome to Paradise" (the version from the album “Dookie”) and "Holiday" in an instrumental version, are used for background music in the film. Neither song appears on the official soundtrack album. In the primary teaser trailer, the song "Get on Top" by the Red Hot Chili Peppers can be heard in the background. "Welcome to Paradise" was also used in the second trailer promoting Surf's Up, as well as "Three Little Birds" by Sean Paul featuring Ziggy Marley. The DVD and Blu-ray behind-the-scenes featurette entitled "Making Waves" features the song "The Water", performed by Venice. This also does not appear on the "Surf's Up" soundtrack but can be found on Venice's "Garage Demos Part 2: Fast Stuff" CD.

Surf's Up: Original Ocean Picture Score was composed for the film by Mychael Danna and it was released on a limited edition (of a thousand units) 23-track CD.

== Release ==
=== Marketing ===
To promote the film's release, surfboard wax bearing the film's logo and a rendering of Cody was given out at the 2006 San Diego Comic-Con. A trailer was attached to Open Season, which was released on September 29, 2006. On June 8, 2007, McDonald's issued eight Surf's Up toys in their Happy Meals for one month. In the Australian market, a few small plush characters of Cody, Lani, Chicken Joe, and Geek replace some of the toys in the US lineup. There was also a tie-in with the candy Airheads which introduces a "New Wave" flavor (pineapple) and four collectible lenticular motion surfboard-shaped pieces. Build-A-Bear stores sold plush toys of the film's protagonist, Cody Maverick. Patrons could "build" their own Cody as well as dress him up in an array of surf-themed clothing and other accessories in Build-A-Bear workshops. They could also purchase Cody and accessories at the official site. Several plushies from Nanco intended for claw machines can also be found and purchased in varying sizes (from 6 inches to 11 inches to 17 inches). Characters available: Cody, Lani, Tank, Geek, Big Z, Chicken Joe, and Reggie Belefonte. A rare set of larger (Geek measures 15 inches) and higher quality plushes had been made available at the premiere's after party. These were won through available games or given away with gift sets for attendees. Cody, Lani, Arnold, and Geek were also created and there are no plans for the dolls to be sold commercially. A series of children's 100-piece puzzles are available as well depicting various characters and setups. Five-inch waterproof plush tub toys were released by Jakks Pacific in minimal quantities to most major retailers. Five characters were produced, including Cody, Tank, Big Z, Arnold, and Chicken Joe. Each character has an attached washcloth/surfboard. Along with the release of the film, a companion Surf's Up video game was released by Ubisoft for Windows, Mac OS X, PlayStation 2 and 3, Xbox 360, as well as the Nintendo GameCube and Wii. All versions of the game are the same with mild graphical differences, with only the Nintendo DS version changing the overall format.

=== Home media ===
Surf's Up was released on Blu-ray, UMD Video and DVD in the United States on October 9, 2007. The DVD and Blu-ray included two animated short films: The ChubbChubbs! and The ChubbChubbs Save Xmas, the latter of which premiered with this release.

== Reception ==
=== Critical response ===
Surf's Up has a 79% approval rating on Rotten Tomatoes based on 147 reviews; the average rating is 6.67/10. The site's consensus reads: "Surf's Up is a laid-back, visually stunning animated movie that brings a fresh twist to some familiar conventions. Its witty mockumentary format is fun and inventive, and the CGI is breathtakingly realistic." Metacritic gave the film a score of 64 out of 100 based on 26 reviews. Audiences surveyed by CinemaScore gave the film a grade "A−" on scale of A+ to F.

Some reviews noted that in spite of it coming so soon after many films featuring penguins (March of the Penguins, Madagascar, and Happy Feet), Surf's Up was able to stand out on its own. Teresa Budasi of the Chicago Sun-Times reviewed: "The originality of the documentary format coupled with the splendid CGI effects qualifies Surf's Up as not just another penguin movie." The Dallas Morning News critic Nancy Churnin agreed: "Sorry, cynics, Surf's Up is a charmer. And if the birds look somewhat familiar, they have something fresh to say about friendship and what winning is all about." James Berardinelli of ReelViews said: "If you have to see one penguin movie, this is it." Roger Moore of Orlando Sentinel gave the film a positive score, noting that it was "beautifully animated, terrifically acted and edited in a way that hilariously mimics those Endless Summer surf documentaries." Conversely, Bill Muller, The Arizona Republic's critic, disliked almost everything: "From the nondescript voices to routine animation to an over-written story, this movie spends much of its time gasping for air."

=== Box office ===
Surf's Up grossed $5,804,772 at the box office on its opening day, then made $17,640,249 during its opening weekend in North America, ranking fourth behind Ocean's Thirteen, Pirates of the Caribbean: At World's End and Knocked Up. The film grossed $58,867,694 in North America, and $93,138,019 in the other territories, making the total worldwide gross $152,005,713.

=== Accolades ===
Award	Date of ceremony	Category	Recipients	Result
Academy Awards	February 24, 2008	Best Animated Feature	Ash Brannon and Chris Buck	Nominated
Annie Awards	February 8, 2008	Best Animated Feature	Surf's Up	Nominated
Annie Awards	February 8, 2008	Outstanding Achievement for Animated Effects in an Animated Production	Deborah Carlson	Won
Annie Awards	February 8, 2008	Animation Production Artist	John Clark	Won
Annie Awards	February 8, 2008	Outstanding Achievement for Character Animation in a Feature Production	Alan Hawkins	Nominated
Annie Awards	February 8, 2008	Outstanding Achievement for Character Animation in a Feature Production	Dave Hardin	Nominated
Annie Awards	February 8, 2008	Outstanding Achievement for Character Design in a Feature Production	Sylvain Deboissy	Nominated
Annie Awards	February 8, 2008	Outstanding Achievement for Directing in an Animated Feature Production	Ash Brannon and Chris Buck	Nominated
Annie Awards	February 8, 2008	Outstanding Achievement for Production Design in an Animated Feature Production	Marcelo Vignali	Nominated
Annie Awards	February 8, 2008	Outstanding Achievement for Storyboarding in an Animated Feature Production	Denise Koyama	Nominated
Annie Awards	February 8, 2008	Outstanding Achievement for Writing in an Animated Feature Production	Don Rhymer, Ash Brannon, Chris Buck and Christopher Jenkins	Nominated
Georges Award	Unknown	Best Animated Movie	Surf's Up	Nominated
Golden Reel Awards	February 23, 2008	Best Sound Editing - SFX, Foley, Dialogue & ADR for Feature Film Animation	Steven Ticknor, Martin Lopez, Michael J. Benavente, Jason King, Ulrika Akander, Gary A. Hecker and Michael Broomberg	Nominated
MTV Russia Movie Awards	April 26, 2008	Best Cartoon	Surf's Up	Nominated
My Nick Awards	September 4, 2008	Movie of the Year	Surf's Up	Won
Saturn Awards	June 24, 2008	Best Animated Feature	Surf's Up	Nominated
VES Awards	February 10, 2009	Best Single Visual Effect of the Year	Rob Bredow, Lydia Bottegoni, Daniel Kramer and Matt Hausman	Nominated
VES Awards	February 10, 2009	Outstanding Performance by an Animated Character in an Animated Motion Picture	David Schaub, Moon-Jung Kang, Brian Casper and Andreas Procopiou	Nominated
VES Awards	February 10, 2009	Outstanding Performance by an Animated Character in an Animated Motion Picture	David Schaub, Peter Nash, James Crossley and Shia LaBeouf	Nominated
VES Awards	February 10, 2009	Outstanding Effects in an Animated Motion Picture	Rob Bredow, Daniel Kramer, Matt Hausman and Danny Dimian	Nominated
Young Artist Awards	March 29, 2009	Best Family Feature Film (Animation)	Surf's Up	Nominated

== Sequel and television series ==
A direct-to-video sequel, titled Surf's Up 2: WaveMania, was released on January 17, 2017. The film stars WWE superstars John Cena, Triple H, The Undertaker, Vince McMahon, and Paige.

On September 25, 2025, it was reported that a television series adaptation was being developed by Atomic Cartoons. Lienne Sawatsky, Dan Williams, and John Hazlett are writing and showrunning the adaptation, with Jennifer Twiner McCarron, Joel Bradley, Aaron Behl and Rick Mischel serving as executive producers, and Kitty Walsh serving as co-executive producer. The comedy series, titled Surf’s Up: The Series, will have 11-minute episodes, targeting kids aged 6–9, and will follow "an over-confident teen penguin named Flip, who teams a zany bunch of young surfers in his attempt to become a surf legend." Cody, Big Z, and Chicken Joe will also return.
