= Steve Moore (cartoonist) =

American cartoonist

- Born: Steven Moore; 1962 (age 63–64)
- Occupations: Animator, cartoonist, film producer, screenwriter
- Notable work: Open Season; Alpha and Omega; Alpha and Omega 2: A Howl-iday Adventure; Alpha and Omega 4: The Legend of the Saw Tooth Cave
- Children: 3

Steven "Steve" Moore (born 1962) is an American cartoonist, screenwriter, and producer. He is the creator and director of the syndicated sports cartoon In the Bleachers and the animated movies Open Season (Sony Pictures Animation), and the Alpha and Omega franchise (alongside Ben Gluck).

Moore contributed a unique one page story to the Tarzan and the Comics of Idaho #1 anthology published by Idaho Comics Group in August 2014.

== Filmography ==
Year	Title	Producer	Writer
2006	Open Season	Executive	Yes
2010	Alpha and Omega	Yes	Yes
2013	Alpha and Omega 2: A Howl-iday Adventure	Yes	No
2014	Alpha and Omega: The Legend of the Saw Tooth Cave	Yes	No
2015	Alpha and Omega: Family Vacation	Yes	No
2016	Alpha and Omega: The Big Fureeze	Yes	Yes
