= Anthony Stacchi =

American effects animator, storyboard artist, screenwriter, and film director (born 1964)

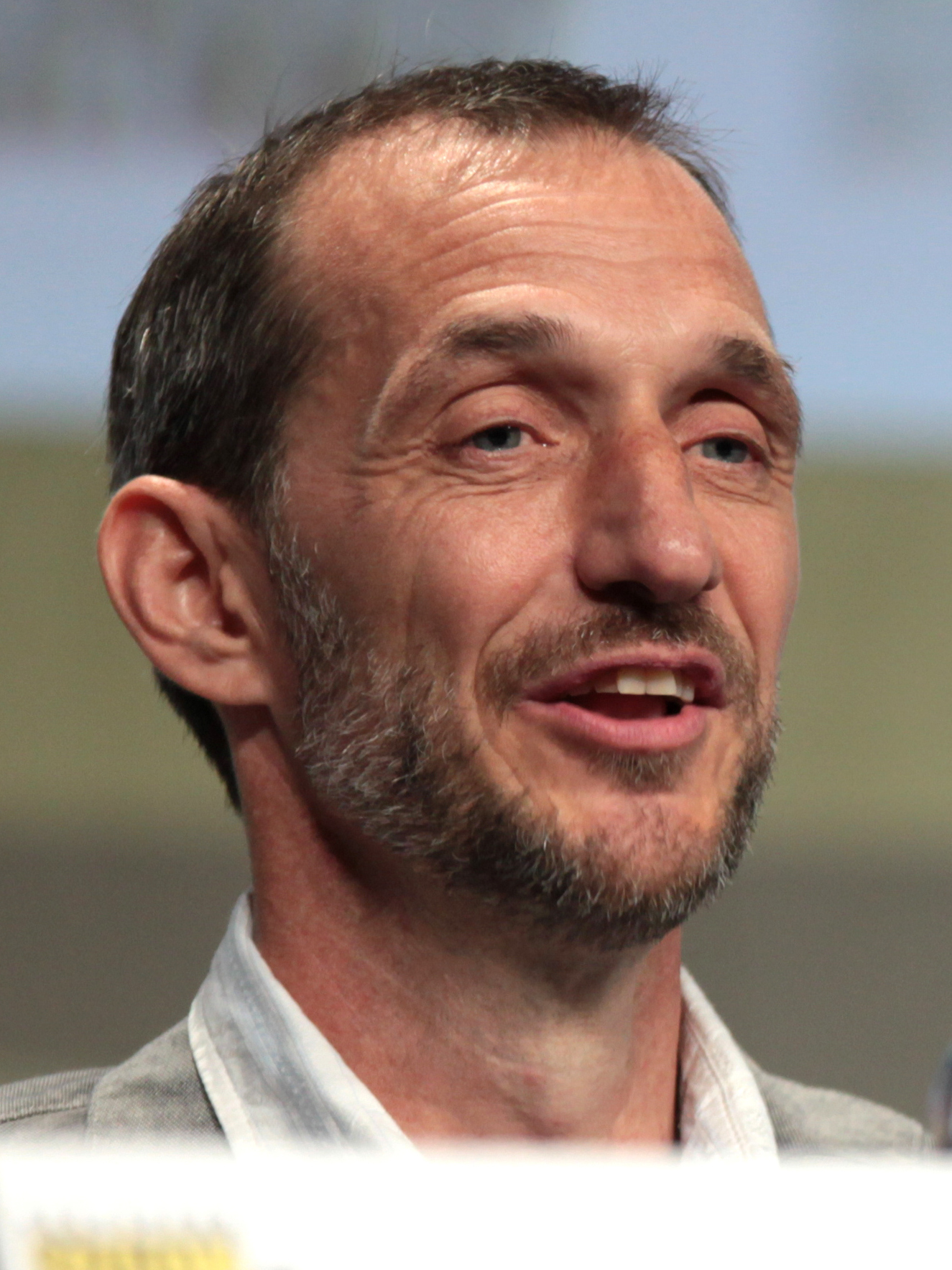
- Stacchi at the 2014 San Diego Comic-Con
- Born: Anthony Stacchi
- Education: California Institute of the Arts
- Occupations: Animator; effects animator; storyboard artist; screenwriter; film director
- Years active: 1985–present
- Known for: Open Season; The Boxtrolls

Anthony Stacchi is an American animator, effects animator, storyboard artist, screenwriter, and film director.

Stacchi graduated from California Institute of the Arts with a BFA in Film in 1986. His student films screened at the 1987 Annecy and Hiroshima Animated Film Festivals. He then went on to be an Animator and Commercial Director at San Francisco's Colossal Pictures and an effects animator at Industrial Light and Magic on Back to the Future 2 and 3, Hook, The Rocketeer and Ghost, and Henry Selick's James and the Giant Peach. He was a storyboard artist for Antz, Spirit: Stallion of the Cimarron, Astro Boy, Missing Link, and Del Toro's Pinocchio and was the head of story for ILM's aborted animated feature Frankenstein, and a short film, Work in Progress.

He made his directorial debut as co-director of Sony Pictures Animation's first film Open Season. He directed the 3D stop-motion animated feature film The Boxtrolls, at Laika. It was released in 2014.

Stacchi's most recent film was The Monkey King, a Netflix original animated film released in 2023.

== Filmography ==
Year	Title	Director	Writer	Storyboard artist	Visual effects	Notes
1985	Back to the Future				Yes	
1989	ABC Weekend Special			Yes		1 episode
1990	Ghost				Yes	
1991	The Rocketeer			Yes		
1991	Hook				Yes	
1991	The Wish That Changed Christmas			Yes	Yes	
1992	Æon Flux			Yes		4 episodes
1993	The Meteor Man				Yes	
1996	James and the Giant Peach				Yes	
1997	KaBlam!		Story			1 episode
1998	Antz			Yes		
2001	Hubert's Brain			Yes		
2002	Spirit: Stallion of the Cimarron			Yes		
2006	Open Season	Co-director	Story			
2006	Boog and Elliot's Midnight Bun Run	Co-director	Story			Short film
2009	Astro Boy					Special thanks
2014	The Boxtrolls	Yes	Story			
2019	Missing Link			Yes		
2022	Guillermo del Toro's Pinocchio			Yes		
2023	The Monkey King	Yes				
