= List of Sony Pictures Animation productions =

Logo used since 2018.

The following is a list of all productions produced or released by Sony Pictures Animation, the animation division of Sony Pictures Motion Picture Group (part of Sony Pictures Entertainment), including animated and live-action feature films, shorts, television and internet series, and specials. As of 2026, Sony Pictures Animation has released 31 feature films, with their first being Open Season in 2006, and their latest being Goat in 2026.

Their upcoming slate of films include Spider-Man: Beyond the Spider-Verse on June 18, 2027, Wish Dragon 2 in summer 2027, The Haunting of Hotel Transylvania on October 8, 2027, Buds on December 22, 2027, and an untitled KPop Demon Hunters sequel in 2029.

== Feature films ==
All films listed are distributed by Columbia Pictures and Sony Pictures Releasing unless noted otherwise.

=== Released ===
Title	Release date	Director(s)	Writer(s)		Producer(s)	Executive Producer(s)	Composer(s)	Distributor/Co-production with	Animation services
Title	Release date	Director(s)	Story	Screenplay	Producer(s)	Executive Producer(s)	Composer(s)	Distributor/Co-production with	Animation services
Open Season	September 29, 2006	Jill Culton; Roger Allers Co-directed by: Anthony Stacchi	Steve Moore; John B. Carls (original story) Jill Culton; Anthony Stacchi (screen story)	Steve Bencich; Ron J. Friedman; Nat Mauldin	Michelle Murdocca	John Carls; Steve Moore	Paul Westerberg; Ramin Djawadi (score) Paul Westerberg (songs)	—N/a	Sony Pictures Imageworks
Surf's Up	June 8, 2007	Ash Brannon; Chris Buck	Chris Jenkins; Christian Darren	Don Rhymer; Ash Brannon; Chris Buck; Chris Jenkins	Chris Jenkins	—N/a	Mychael Danna	—N/a	Sony Pictures Imageworks
Open Season 2	September 24, 2008	Matthew O'Callaghan Co-directed by: Todd Wilderman	David I. Stern		Kirk Bodyfelt; Matthew O'Callaghan	Jill Culton; Michelle Murdocca	Ramin Djawadi	Sony Pictures Home Entertainment	Sony Pictures Imageworks; Reel FX Entertainment
Cloudy with a Chance of Meatballs	September 18, 2009	Phil Lord; Christopher Miller			Pam Marsden	Yair Landau	Mark Mothersbaugh	—N/a	Sony Pictures Imageworks
Open Season 3	January 25, 2011	Cody Cameron	David I. Stern		Kirk Bodyfelt	David I. Stern	Jeff Cardoni	Sony Pictures Home Entertainment	Sony Pictures Imageworks; Reel FX Entertainment
The Smurfs (Note: Combines live-action with animation)	July 29, 2011	Raja Gosnell	J. David Stem; David N. Weiss	J. David Stem; David N. Weiss; David Ronn; Jay Scherick	Jordan Kerner	Ezra Swerdlow; Ben Haber; Paul Neesan	Heitor Pereira	The Kerner Entertainment Company	Sony Pictures Imageworks
Arthur Christmas (Note: Not produced, but released by Sony Pictures Animation under its label)	November 23, 2011	Sarah Smith Co-directed by: Barry Cook	Peter Baynham; Sarah Smith		Peter Lord; David Sproxton; Carla Shelley; Steve Pegram	Peter Baynham; Cherla Abood	Harry Gregson-Williams	Aardman Animations	Aardman Animations (Note: Pre-production and post-production); Sony Pictures Imageworks
The Pirates: Band of Misfits	April 27, 2012	Peter Lord Co-directed by: Jeff Newitt	Gideon Defoe		Julie Lockhart; Peter Lord; David Sproxton	Carla Shelley	Theodore Shapiro	Aardman Animations	DNEG; Aardman Animations
Hotel Transylvania	September 28, 2012	Genndy Tartakovsky	Todd Durham; Dan Hageman; Kevin Hageman	Peter Baynham; Robert Smigel	Michelle Murdocca	Adam Sandler; Robert Smigel; Allen Covert	Mark Mothersbaugh	—N/a	Sony Pictures Imageworks
The Smurfs 2	July 31, 2013	Raja Gosnell	J. David Stem; David N. Weiss; David Ronn; Jay Scherick	J. David Stem; David N. Weiss; David Ronn; Jay Scherick; Karey Kirkpatrick	Jordan Kerner	Ezra Swerdlow; Ben Haber; Paul Neesan	Heitor Pereira	The Kerner Entertainment Company	Sony Pictures Imageworks
Cloudy with a Chance of Meatballs 2	September 27, 2013	Cody Cameron; Kris Pearn	Phil Lord; Christopher Miller; Erica Rivinoja	Erica Rivinoja; John Francis Daley; Jonathan Goldstein	Pam Marsden; Kirk Bodyfelt	Phil Lord; Christopher Miller	Mark Mothersbaugh	—N/a	Sony Pictures Imageworks
Hotel Transylvania 2	September 25, 2015	Genndy Tartakovsky	Adam Sandler; Robert Smigel		Michelle Murdocca	Adam Sandler; Allen Covert; Robert Smigel; Ben Waisbren	Mark Mothersbaugh	LStar Capital; MRC	Sony Pictures Imageworks
Goosebumps	October 16, 2015	Rob Letterman	Scott Alexander; Larry Karaszewski	Darren Lemke	Deborah Forte; Neal H. Moritz	Tania Landau; Bill Bannerman; Bruce Berman; Greg Basser	Danny Elfman	LStar Capital; Village Roadshow Pictures; Original Film; Scholastic Entertainment	Moving Picture Company
Open Season: Scared Silly	December 18, 2015	David Feiss	Steve Parr; David Feiss; Stephan Franck; Paul McEvoy; John Norton; Kris Pearn	Carlos Kotkin	John Bush	—N/a	Rupert Gregson-Williams; Dominic Lewis	Sony Pictures Home Entertainment	Mainframe Studios
Surf's Up 2: WaveMania	January 17, 2017	Henry Yu	Abdul Williams		Michelle L.M Wong	Michael J. Luisi	Toby Chu	Sony Pictures Home Entertainment; WWE Studios	Mainframe Studios
Smurfs: The Lost Village	April 7, 2017	Kelly Asbury	Stacey Harman; Pamela Ribon		Jordan Kerner; Mary Ellen Bauder Andrews	Raja Gosnell; Ben Waisbern	Christopher Lennertz	LStar Capital; The Kerner Entertainment Company; Wanda Pictures	Sony Pictures Imageworks
The Emoji Movie	July 28, 2017	Tony Leondis	Tony Leondis; Eric Siegel	Tony Leondis; Eric Siegel; Mike White	Michelle Raimo Kouyate	—N/a	Patrick Doyle	—N/a	Sony Pictures Imageworks
The Star	November 17, 2017	Timothy Reckart	Carlos Kotkin; Simon Moore	Carlos Kotkin	Jennifer Magee-Cook	DeVon Franklin; Brian Henson; Lisa Henson	John Paesano	The Jim Henson Company; Franklin Entertainment; Walden Media; Affirm Films	Cinesite
Peter Rabbit	February 9, 2018	Will Gluck	Will Gluck; Rob Lieber		Will Gluck; Zareh Nalbandian	Doug Belgrad; Jodi Hilbebrand; Catherine Bishop; Susan Bolsover; Emma Topping	Dominic Lewis	Olive Bridge Entertainment; 2.0 Entertainment; Screen Australia	Animal Logic
Hotel Transylvania 3: Summer Vacation	July 13, 2018	Genndy Tartakovsky	Genndy Tartakovsky; Michael McCullers		Michelle Murdocca	—N/a	Mark Mothersbaugh	MRC	Sony Pictures Imageworks
Goosebumps 2: Haunted Halloween	October 12, 2018	Ari Sandel	Darren Lemke; Rob Lieber	Rob Lieber	Deborah Forte; Neal H. Moritz	Timothy M. Bourne; Tania Landau	Dominic Lewis	Original Film; Scholastic Entertainment; Silvertongue Films	Pixomondo
Spider-Man: Into the Spider-Verse	December 14, 2018	Bob Persichetti; Peter Ramsey; Rodney Rothman	Phil Lord	Phil Lord; Rodney Rothman	Avi Arad; Amy Pascal; Phil Lord; Christopher Miller; Christina Steinberg	Stan Lee; Brian Michael Bendis; Will Allegra	Daniel Pemberton	Marvel Entertainment; Arad Productions; Lord Miller Productions; Pascal Pictures	Sony Pictures Imageworks
The Angry Birds Movie 2	August 14, 2019	Thurop Van Orman Co-directed by: John Rice	Peter Ackerman; Eyal Podell; Jonathon E. Stewart		John Cohen	David Maisel; Catherine Winder; Aron Warner	Heitor Pereira	Rovio Entertainment	Sony Pictures Imageworks
The Mitchells vs. the Machines	April 30, 2021	Mike Rianda Co-directed by: Jeff Rowe	Mike Rianda; Jeff Rowe		Phil Lord; Christopher Miller; Kurt Albrecht	Louis Koo; Will Allegra	Mark Mothersbaugh	Netflix; Lord Miller Productions; One Cool Films	Sony Pictures Imageworks
Wish Dragon	June 11, 2021	Chris Appelhans			Aron Warner; Chris Bremble; Jackie Chan	Ian Sugarman; Manofei Zhou; Edward Cheng; Joe Tam; Howard Chen; Sophie Xiao	Philip Klein	Netflix; Beijing Sparkle Roll Media Corporation; Tencent Pictures; Base FX; Flagship Entertainment Group; Boss Collaboration; Cultural Investment Holdings	Base FX; Industrial Light & Magic; Titmouse Inc. Original Force
Vivo	August 6, 2021	Kirk DeMicco Co-directed by: Brandon Jeffords	Peter Barsocchini; Quiara Alegría Hudes	Kirk DeMicco; Quiara Alegría Hudes	Lisa Stewart; Michelle L.M. Wong; Rich Moore	Lin-Manuel Miranda; Laurence Mark; Louis Koo; Tin Lok	Alex Lacamoire (score) Lin-Manuel Miranda (songs)	Netflix; One Cool Films; Laurence Mark Productions	Sony Pictures Imageworks
Hotel Transylvania: Transformania	January 14, 2022	Derek Drymon; Jennifer Kluska	Genndy Tartakovsky	Amos Vernon; Nunzio Randuzzo; Genndy Tartakovsky	Alice Dewey Goldstone	Genndy Tartakovsky; Michelle Murdocca; Selena Gomez	Mark Mothersbaugh	Amazon Studios; MRC	Sony Pictures Imageworks
Spider-Man: Across the Spider-Verse	June 2, 2023	Joaquim Dos Santos; Kemp Powers; Justin K. Thompson	Phil Lord; Christopher Miller; Dave Callaham		Phil Lord; Christopher Miller; Amy Pascal; Avi Arad; Christina Steinberg	Bob Persichetti; Peter Ramsey; Rodney Rothman; Aditya Sood; Brian Michael Bendis	Daniel Pemberton	Marvel Entertainment; Arad Productions; Lord Miller Productions; Pascal Pictures	Sony Pictures Imageworks
KPop Demon Hunters	June 20, 2025	Maggie Kang; Chris Appelhans	Maggie Kang	Hannah McMechan; Danya Jimenez; Maggie Kang; Chris Appelhans	Michelle L.M. Wong	—N/a	Marcelo Zarvos	Netflix	Sony Pictures Imageworks
Fixed (Note: Adult animation)	August 13, 2025	Genndy Tartakovsky	Genndy Tartakovsky; Jon Vitti; Steve Greenberg; Rich Lufrano	Genndy Tartakovsky; Jon Vitti	Michelle Murdocca	—N/a	Tyler Bates; Joanne Higginbottom	Netflix	Renegade Animation; Lightstar Studios
Goat	February 13, 2026	Tyree Dillihay Co-directed by: Adam Rosette	Nicolas Curcio; Peter Chiarelli	Aaron Buchsbaum; Teddy Riley	Michelle Raimo Kouyate; Rodney Rothman; Adam Rosenberg; Stephen Curry; Erick Peyton	Rick Mischel; Fonda Snyder	Kris Bowers	MACRO; Unanimous Media; Modern Magic	Sony Pictures Imageworks

=== Upcoming films ===
Title	Release date	Director(s)	Writer(s)		Producer(s)	Executive producer(s)	Distributor/Co-production with	Animation services	Status	Ref notes
Title	Release date	Director(s)	Story	Screenplay	Producer(s)	Executive producer(s)	Distributor/Co-production with	Animation services	Status	Ref notes
Spider-Man: Beyond the Spider-Verse	June 18, 2027	Bob Persichetti; Justin K. Thompson	Based on the Marvel Comics		Phil Lord; Christopher Miller; Amy Pascal; Avi Arad; Jinko Gotoh	Christina Steinberg; Peter Ramsey; Rodney Rothman; Aditya Sood; Brian Michael Bendis	Arad Productions; Lord Miller Productions; Pascal Pictures	Sony Pictures Imageworks	In production	
Spider-Man: Beyond the Spider-Verse	June 18, 2027	Bob Persichetti; Justin K. Thompson	Phil Lord; Christopher Miller; Dave Callaham		Phil Lord; Christopher Miller; Amy Pascal; Avi Arad; Jinko Gotoh	Christina Steinberg; Peter Ramsey; Rodney Rothman; Aditya Sood; Brian Michael Bendis	Arad Productions; Lord Miller Productions; Pascal Pictures	Sony Pictures Imageworks	In production	
Wish Dragon 2	Summer 2027	Chris Bremble	Chris Appelhans		Chris Bremble	TBA	Netflix; Base FX	Base FX	In production	
The Haunting of Hotel Transylvania	October 8, 2027	Jennifer Kluska; Alan Hawkins	TBA		Lawrence Jonas	Genndy Tartakovsky; Michelle Murdocca	Amazon MGM Studios	Sony Pictures Imageworks	In production	
Buds	December 22, 2027	TBA							In production	
Untitled KPop Demon Hunters sequel	2029	Maggie Kang; Chris Appelhans			TBA		Netflix	Sony Pictures Imageworks	In development	
Undated
Bubble	TBA	TBA	Based on the podcast by: Jordan Morris		Seth Rogen; Evan Goldberg; Matt Tolmach	Kyle Hunter; Ariel Shaffir; James Weaver; David Manpearl	Point Grey Pictures; Matt Tolmach Productions	TBA	In development	
Bubble	TBA	TBA	Jordan Morris		Seth Rogen; Evan Goldberg; Matt Tolmach	Kyle Hunter; Ariel Shaffir; James Weaver; David Manpearl	Point Grey Pictures; Matt Tolmach Productions	TBA	In development	
Hungry Ghosts	TBA	Charlie Bean	Based on the graphic novel by: Anthony Bourdain; Joel Rose; Alberto Ponticelli; Irene Koh; Paul Pope		TBA				In development	
Hungry Ghosts	TBA	Charlie Bean	Susan Hurwitz Arneson		TBA				In development	
Roboken	TBA	TBA			John Francis Daley; Jonathan Goldstein	TBA			In development	
Spider-Punk	TBA	TBA	Based on the Marvel Comics		TBA				In development	
Spider-Punk	TBA	TBA	Daniel Kaluuya; Ajon Singh		TBA				In development	
Spider-Woman	TBA	TBA	Based on the Marvel Comics		TBA		Arad Productions; Pascal Pictures	TBA	In development	
Spider-Woman	TBA	TBA	TBA		TBA		Arad Productions; Pascal Pictures	TBA	In development	
Tao	TBA	Emily Dean	Tonya Kong	TBA					Paused	
Tut	TBA	Matthew A. Cherry	Matthew A. Cherry; Monica A. Young	TBA					In development	
Untitled Ghostbusters spin-off film	TBA	Kris Pearn	Based on the characters by: Dan Aykroyd; Harold Ramis		TBA		Netflix; Ghost Corps	TBA	In development	
Untitled Ghostbusters spin-off film	TBA	Kris Pearn	TBA		TBA		Netflix; Ghost Corps	TBA	In development	
Untitled The Mitchells vs. the Machines sequel	TBA	Guillermo Martinez; JP Sans	Wendy Molyneux; Lizzie Molyneux-Logelin		Phil Lord; Christopher Miller; Kurt Albrecht	Mike Rianda; Jeff Rowe; Aditya Sood	Netflix; Lord Miller Productions	TBA	In development	
Untitled Venom film	TBA	Zach Lipovsky; Adam B. Stein	Based on the Marvel Comics	TBA				TBA	In development	
Untitled Venom film	TBA	Zach Lipovsky; Adam B. Stein	TBA	TBA				TBA	In development	

== Short films ==
=== Released shorts ===
Title	Release date	Directed by	Animation services	Release with	Notes
The ChubbChubbs!	July 3, 2002	Eric Armstrong	Sony Pictures Imageworks	Men in Black II	Theatrical release
Early Bloomer	May 9, 2003	Kevin Johnson	Sony Pictures Imageworks	Daddy Day Care	Theatrical release
Boog and Elliot's Midnight Bun Run	January 30, 2007	Jill Culton	Sony Pictures Imageworks	Open Season	Home media release
The Chubbchubbs Save Xmas	August 8, 2007	Cody Cameron	Prana Studios	Daddy Day Camp	Theatrical release
The Smurfs: A Christmas Carol	December 2, 2011	Troy Quane	Sony Pictures Imageworks; Duck Studios	The Smurfs	Home media release
So You Want to Be a Pirate!	August 28, 2012	Jay Grace	Aardman Animations	The Pirates! Band of Misfits	Home media release
Goodnight Mr. Foot	October 26, 2012	Genndy Tartakovsky	Rough Draft Studios	Hotel Transylvania	Limited theatrical release
The Smurfs: The Legend of Smurfy Hollow	September 10, 2013	Stephan Franck	Sony Pictures Imageworks; Duck Studios	The Smurfs 2	Home media release
Super Manny	October 2, 2013	David Feiss	Sony Pictures Imageworks; 6 Point Harness	Cloudy with a Chance of Meatballs 2	Limited theatrical release
Earl Scouts	October 9, 2013	David Feiss	Sony Pictures Imageworks; 6 Point Harness	Cloudy with a Chance of Meatballs 2	Limited theatrical release
Steve's First Bath	January 28, 2014	David Feiss	Sony Pictures Imageworks; 6 Point Harness	Cloudy with a Chance of Meatballs 2	Home media release
Attack of the 50-Foot Gummi Bear	January 28, 2014	David Feiss	6 Point Harness	Cloudy with a Chance of Meatballs 2	Home media release
Puppy!	July 28, 2017	Genndy Tartakovsky	Sony Pictures Imageworks	The Emoji Movie	Theatrical release
Flopsy Turvy	March 30, 2018	David Scott	Animal Logic	Peter Rabbit	Limited theatrical release
Spider-Ham: Caught in a Ham	March 19, 2019	Miguel Jiron	Titmouse, Inc.	Spider-Man: Into the Spider-Verse	Home media release
Hair Love	August 14, 2019	Matthew A. Cherry; Everett Downing Jr. Bruce W. Smith	Lion Forge Entertainment	The Angry Birds Movie 2	Theatrical release
Live Stream	November 12, 2019	John Rice	Sony Pictures Imageworks	The Angry Birds Movie 2	Home media release
Monster Pets	April 3, 2021	Jennifer Kluska; Derek Drymon	Sony Pictures Imageworks	Various films	Theatrical release
Dog Cop 7: The Final Chapter	December 14, 2021	Caitlin Vanarsdale	Sony Pictures Imageworks	The Mitchells vs. the Machines	Home media release
The Spider Within: A Spider-Verse Story	March 27, 2024	Jarelle Dampier	Sony Pictures Imageworks	YouTube	Online release

=== Upcoming shorts ===
Title	Release date	Directed by	Animation services	Release with	Notes
Debut: A KPop Demon Hunters Story	TBA				

== Television series ==
=== Released series ===
Title	Creator(s)/Developer(s)	Premiere date	End date	Network	Co-production with	Animation services
Cloudy with a Chance of Meatballs	Mark Evestaff; Alex Galatis	February 20, 2017	June 30, 2018	Cartoon Network (United States; Season 1); Boomerang SVOD (United States; Season 2); YTV (Canada)	Corus Entertainment; DHX Media	DHX Media Vancouver; DHX Media Toronto; Cartoon Conrad
Hotel Transylvania: The Series	Mark Steinberg	June 25, 2017	October 29, 2020	Disney Channel/Disney XD (United States); Teletoon (Canada)	Nelvana; Corus Entertainment	Pipeline Studios; Yeti Farm Creative
Go! Cartoons	Fred Seibert	November 7, 2017	April 10, 2018	Cartoon Hangover	Frederator Studios	Digital eMation; Dongwoo A&E
Agent Elvis	Priscilla Presley; John Eddie; Mike Arnold	March 17, 2023		Netflix	Titmouse, Inc.	Combo Studio
Young Love	Matthew A. Cherry	September 20, 2023	October 19, 2023	HBO Max	Lion Forge Animation; Carl Jones Studios; Cherry Lane Productions	Atomic Cartoons
Open Season: Call of Nature	Jennie Stacey; Kent Redecker	November 3, 2023	May 31, 2024	Family Channel (Canada); Tubi/The Roku Channel (United States)	9 Story Media Group; Brown Bag Films	—N/a

=== Upcoming series ===
Title	Creator(s)/Developer(s)	Premiere date	Network	Co-production with	Animation services
Motel Transylvania	Genndy Tartakovsky	2027	Netflix	—N/a	ICON Creative Studio
Ghostbusters: Night Shift	Ben Hibon; Elliott Kalan	2027	Netflix	Netflix Animation Studios; Ghost Corps	Flying Bark Productions
Superbago!	—N/a	TBA	Netflix	Stoopid Buddy Stoodios	—N/a
Surf's Up: The Series	Lienne Sawatsky; Dan Williams; John Hazlett	TBA	TBA	Atomic Cartoons	TBA

== Related productions ==
Film	Release date	Studio	Distributor	Notes
The Angry Birds Movie	May 20, 2016	Columbia Pictures; Rovio Animation	Sony Pictures Releasing	First film of the Angry Birds film franchise; the sequel, The Angry Birds Movie 2, was co-produced under Sony Pictures Animation's label.
Peter Rabbit 2: The Runaway	March 25, 2021	Columbia Pictures; Animal Logic; MRC; 2.0 Entertainment; Olive Bridge Entertainment	Sony Pictures Releasing	Sequel to Peter Rabbit; the first film was produced with the involvement of Sony Pictures Animation, but the sequel was not.
The Angry Birds Movie 3	December 23, 2026	Rovio Entertainment; Sega Sammy Group; Prime Focus Studios	Paramount Pictures	Third film of the Angry Birds film franchise; it is the sequel to The Angry Birds Movie 2, which was co-produced under Sony Pictures Animation's label.

== Reception ==
=== Box office ===
Film	Budget	North America		Overseas gross	Worldwide gross (unadjusted)	Ref(s)
Film	Budget	Opening	Gross (unadjusted)	Overseas gross	Worldwide gross (unadjusted)	Ref(s)
Open Season	$85 million	$23,624,548	$85,105,259	$115,706,430	$200,811,689	
Surf's Up	$100 million	$17,640,249	$58,867,694	$93,138,019	$152,005,713	
Open Season 2	—N/a	—N/a	—N/a	$8,797,168	$8,797,168	
Cloudy with a Chance of Meatballs	$100 million	$30,304,648	$124,870,275	$118,135,851	$243,006,126	
Open Season 3	—N/a	—N/a	—N/a	$7,487,555	$7,487,555	
The Smurfs	$110 million	$35,611,637	$142,614,158	$421,135,165	$563,749,323	
Arthur Christmas	$100 million	$12,068,931	$46,462,469	$100,959,250	$147,421,719	
The Pirates! Band of Misfits	$55 million	$11,137,734	$31,051,126	$92,002,915	$123,054,041	
Hotel Transylvania	$85 million	$42,522,194	$148,313,048	$210,062,555	$358,375,603	
The Smurfs 2	$105 million	$17,548,389	$71,017,784	$276,527,576	$347,545,360	
Cloudy with a Chance of Meatballs 2	$78 million	$34,017,930	$119,793,567	$154,532,382	$274,325,949	
Hotel Transylvania 2	$80 million	$48,464,322	$169,305,890	$305,099,890	$474,800,000	
Goosebumps	$58–84 million	$23,618,556	$80,080,379	$78,181,045	$158,261,424	
Open Season: Scared Silly	$5.5 million	—N/a	—N/a	$1,774,429	$1,774,429	
Surf's Up 2: WaveMania	—N/a	—N/a	—N/a	$1,213,943	$1,213,943	
Smurfs: The Lost Village	$60 million	$13,210,449	$45,020,282	$152,163,264	$197,183,546	
The Emoji Movie	$50 million	$24,531,923	$86,089,513	$131,687,133	$217,776,646	
The Star	$20 million	$9,812,674	$40,896,334	$21,960,409	$62,856,743	
Peter Rabbit	$50 million	$25,010,928	$115,253,424	$236,242,642	$351,496,066	
Hotel Transylvania 3: Summer Vacation	$80 million	$44,076,225	$167,510,016	$361,073,758	$528,583,774	
Goosebumps 2: Haunted Halloween	$35 million	$15,802,225	$46,700,633	$46,619,747	$93,320,380	
Spider-Man: Into the Spider-Verse	$90 million	$35,363,376	$190,241,310	$194,057,426	$384,298,736	
The Angry Birds Movie 2	$65 million	$10,354,073	$41,657,076	$110,361,736	$152,018,812	
Wish Dragon	$25 million	—N/a	—N/a	$25,860,000	$25,860,000	
Vivo	—N/a	—N/a	—N/a	$1,326,371	$1,326,371	
Hotel Transylvania: Transformania	$75 million	—N/a	—N/a	$18,480,000	$18,480,000	
Spider-Man: Across the Spider-Verse	$100–150 million	$120,663,589	$381,593,754	$309,304,156	$690,897,910	
KPop Demon Hunters	$100 million+	—N/a	—N/a	$19,200,000	$19,200,000	
Goat	$80–90 million	$26,000,000	$58,301,328	$44,000,000	$195,382,928	

=== Critical and public response ===
Film	Rotten Tomatoes	Metacritic	CinemaScore
Open Season	48% (102 reviews)	49 (18 reviews)	A-
Surf's Up	79% (147 reviews)	64 (26 reviews)	A-
Cloudy with a Chance of Meatballs	85% (141 reviews)	66 (24 reviews)	A-
The Smurfs	21% (119 reviews)	30 (22 reviews)	A-
Arthur Christmas	92% (168 reviews)	69 (32 reviews)	A-
The Pirates! Band of Misfits	87% (151 reviews)	73 (31 reviews)	B
Hotel Transylvania	45% (143 reviews)	47 (32 reviews)	A-
The Smurfs 2	14% (92 reviews)	34 (30 reviews)	A-
Cloudy with a Chance of Meatballs 2	72% (123 reviews)	59 (31 reviews)	A-
Hotel Transylvania 2	57% (108 reviews)	44 (24 reviews)	A-
Goosebumps	78% (164 reviews)	60 (29 reviews)	A
Smurfs: The Lost Village	41% (96 reviews)	40 (25 reviews)	A
The Emoji Movie	6% (132 reviews)	12 (26 reviews)	B
The Star	45% (51 reviews)	42 (52 reviews)	A
Peter Rabbit	64% (148 reviews)	51 (26 reviews)	A-
Hotel Transylvania 3: Summer Vacation	62% (119 reviews)	54 (23 reviews)	A-
Goosebumps 2: Haunted Halloween	48% (93 reviews)	53 (20 reviews)	B
Spider-Man: Into the Spider-Verse	97% (398 reviews)	87 (50 reviews)	A+
The Angry Birds Movie 2	72% (109 reviews)	60 (23 reviews)	B+
The Mitchells vs. the Machines	97% (213 reviews)	81 (33 reviews)	—N/a
Wish Dragon	71% (24 reviews)	59 (6 reviews)	—N/a
Vivo	86% (107 reviews)	66 (22 reviews)	—N/a
Hotel Transylvania: Transformania	47% (76 reviews)	46 (15 reviews)	—N/a
Spider-Man: Across the Spider-Verse	95% (390 reviews)	86 (60 reviews)	A
KPop Demon Hunters	92% (101 reviews)	77 (9 reviews)	—N/a
Fixed	56% (62 reviews)	51 (12 reviews)	—N/a
Goat	85% (70 reviews)	60 (16 reviews)	A

== Accolades ==
=== Academy Awards ===
Year	Film	Category	Recipient(s)	Result	Ref.
2002	The ChubbChubbs!	Best Animated Short Film	Eric Armstrong	Won	
2007	Surf's Up	Best Animated Feature	Ash Brannon and Chris Buck	Nominated	
2012	The Pirates! Band of Misfits	Best Animated Feature	Peter Lord	Nominated	
2018	Spider-Man: Into the Spider-Verse	Best Animated Feature	Bob Persichetti, Peter Ramsey, Rodney Rothman, Phil Lord, and Christopher Miller	Won	
2019	Hair Love	Best Animated Short Film	Matthew A. Cherry and Karen Rupert Toliver	Won	
2021	The Mitchells vs. the Machines	Best Animated Feature	Mike Rianda, Phil Lord, Christopher Miller, and Kurt Albrecht	Nominated	
2023	Spider-Man: Across the Spider-Verse	Best Animated Feature	Kemp Powers, Justin K. Thompson, Joaquim Dos Santos, Phil Lord, and Christopher Miller	Nominated	
2025	KPop Demon Hunters	Best Animated Feature	Maggie Kang, Chris Appelhans, and Michelle L. M. Wong	Won	
2025	KPop Demon Hunters	Best Original Song	"Golden" — Ejae, Mark Sonnenblick, Joong Gyu Kwak, Yu Han Lee, Hee Dong Nam, Jeong Hoon Seon, and Teddy Park	Won	

=== Annie Awards ===
Year	Film	Category	Recipient(s)	Result
2006	Open Season	Best Animated Feature	Michelle Murdocca	Nominated
2006	Open Season	Best Animated Effects	David Stephens	Nominated
2006	Open Season	Best Character Design in an Animated Feature Production	Carter Goodrich	Nominated
2006	Open Season	Best Production Design in an Animated Feature Production	Andrew Edward Harkness	Nominated
2006	Open Season	Best Production Design in an Animated Feature Production	Michael Humphries	Nominated
2006	Open Season	Best Storyboarding in an Animated Feature Production	Kris Pearn	Nominated
2007	Surf's Up	Best Animated Feature	Chris Jenkins	Nominated
2007	Surf's Up	Animated Effects	Deborah Carlson	Won
2007	Surf's Up	Animation Production Artist	John Clark	Won
2007	Surf's Up	Character Animation in a Feature Production	Dave Hardin	Nominated
2007	Surf's Up	Character Animation in a Feature Production	Alan Hawkins	Nominated
2007	Surf's Up	Character Design in an Animated Feature Production	Sylvain Deboissy	Nominated
2007	Surf's Up	Directing in an Animated Feature Production	Ash Brannon and Chris Buck	Nominated
2007	Surf's Up	Production Design in an Animated Feature Production	Marcelo Vignali	Nominated
2007	Surf's Up	Storyboarding in an Animated Feature Production	Denise Koyama	Nominated
2007	Surf's Up	Writing in an Animated Feature Production	Don Rhymer, Ash Brannon, and Chris Buck	Nominated
2009	Cloudy with a Chance of Meatballs	Best Animated Feature	Pam Marsden	Nominated
2009	Cloudy with a Chance of Meatballs	Animated Effects	Tom Kluyskens	Nominated
2009	Cloudy with a Chance of Meatballs	Directing in a Feature Production	Phil Lord and Christopher Miller	Nominated
2009	Cloudy with a Chance of Meatballs	Writing in a Feature Production	Phil Lord and Christopher Miller	Nominated
2010	Open Season 2	Best Home Entertainment Production	Sony Pictures Home Entertainment	Nominated
2011	Arthur Christmas	Best Animated Feature	Peter Lord, David Sproxton, Carla Shelley and Steve Pegram	Nominated
2011	Arthur Christmas	Character Design in a Feature Production	Peter de Sève	Won
2011	Arthur Christmas	Storyboarding in a Feature Production	Kris Pearn	Nominated
2011	Arthur Christmas	Voice Acting in a Feature Production	Ashley Jensen	Nominated
2011	Arthur Christmas	Voice Acting in a Feature Production	Bill Nighy	Won
2011	Arthur Christmas	Writing in a Feature Production	Sarah Smith, Peter Baynham	Nominated
2012	The Pirates! Band of Misfits	Best Animated Feature	Julie Lockhart, Peter Lord and David Sproxton	Nominated
2012	The Pirates! Band of Misfits	Character Animation in a Feature Production	Will Beecher	Nominated
2012	The Pirates! Band of Misfits	Production Design in an Animated Feature Production	Norman Garwood and Matt Berry	Nominated
2012	The Pirates! Band of Misfits	Voice Acting in an Animated Feature Production	Imelda Staunton	Nominated
2012	The Pirates! Band of Misfits	Writing in an Animated Feature Production	Gideon Defoe	Nominated
2012	Hotel Transylvania	Best Animated Feature	Michelle Murdocca	Nominated
2012	Hotel Transylvania	Character Design in an Animated Feature Production	Carlos Grangel	Nominated
2012	Hotel Transylvania	Character Design in an Animated Feature Production	Carter Goodrich	Nominated
2012	Hotel Transylvania	Directing in an Animated Feature Production	Genndy Tartakovsky	Nominated
2012	Hotel Transylvania	Music in an Animated Feature Production	Mark Mothersbaugh	Nominated
2012	Hotel Transylvania	Production Design in an Animated Feature Production	Marcello Vignali	Nominated
2012	Hotel Transylvania	Voice Acting in an Animated Feature Production	Adam Sandler	Nominated
2012	Hotel Transylvania	Editorial in an Animated Feature Production	Catherine Apple	Nominated
2013	The Smurfs: The Legend of Smurfy Hollow	Directing in an Animated TV/Broadcast Production	Stephan Franck	Nominated
2013	Cloudy with a Chance of Meatballs 2	Character Design in an Animated Feature Production	Craig Kellman	Nominated
2013	Cloudy with a Chance of Meatballs 2	Music in an Animated Feature Production	Mark Mothersbaugh	Nominated
2013	Cloudy with a Chance of Meatballs 2	Voice Acting in an Animated Feature Production	Terry Crews	Nominated
2015	Hotel Transylvania 2	Outstanding Animated Effects in an Animated Production	Chris Logan, Brian Casper, Gavin Baxter and William Eckroat	Nominated
2015	Hotel Transylvania 2	Outstanding Character Design in an Animated Production	Craig Kellman and Stephen DeStefano	Nominated
2015	Hotel Transylvania 2	Outstanding Storyboarding in an Animated Production	Mike Smukavic	Nominated
2016	Open Season: Scared Silly	Outstanding Achievement in Directing in an Animated TV/Broadcast Production	David Feiss	Nominated
2016	Open Season: Scared Silly	Outstanding Achievement in Voice Acting in an Animated TV/Broadcast Production	Will Townsend As the voice of "Mr. Weenie".	Nominated
2017	Smurfs: The Lost Village	Character Design in an Animated Feature Production	Patrick Mate	Nominated
2017	The Star	Best Storyboarding in an Animated Feature Production	Louie del Carmen	Nominated
2017	The Star	Best Editorial in an Animated Feature Production	Pamela Ziegenhagen	Nominated
2018	Hotel Transylvania 3	Outstanding Animated Effects in an Animated Production	Patrick Witting, Kiel Gnebb, R. Spencer Lueder, Joseph Peppe and Sam Rickles	Nominated
2018	Hotel Transylvania 3	Outstanding Achievement for Directing in an Animated Feature Production	Genndy Tartakovsky	Nominated
2018	Hotel Transylvania 3	Outstanding Achievement for Production Design in an Animated Feature Production	Scott Wills	Nominated
2018	Spider-Man: Into the Spider-Verse	Best Animated Feature	Avi Arad, Amy Pascal, Phil Lord, Christopher Miller and Christina Steinberg	Won
2018	Spider-Man: Into the Spider-Verse	Outstanding Achievement for Character Animation in an Animated Feature Production	David Han	Won
2018	Spider-Man: Into the Spider-Verse	Outstanding Achievement for Character Design in an Animated Feature Production	Shiyoon Kim	Won
2018	Spider-Man: Into the Spider-Verse	Outstanding Achievement for Directing in an Animated Feature Production	Bob Persichetti, Peter Ramsey and Rodney Rothman	Won
2018	Spider-Man: Into the Spider-Verse	Outstanding Achievement for Production Design in an Animated Feature Production	Justin K. Thompson	Won
2018	Spider-Man: Into the Spider-Verse	Outstanding Achievement for Writing in an Animated Feature Production	Phil Lord and Rodney Rothman	Won
2018	Spider-Man: Into the Spider-Verse	Outstanding Achievement for Editorial in an Animated Feature Production	Bob Fisher, Andrew Leviton and Vivek Sharma	Won
2021	The Mitchells vs. the Machines	Best Animated Feature	Phil Lord, Christopher Miller and Kurt Albrecht	Won
2021	The Mitchells vs. the Machines	Best FX – Feature	FX Production Company: Sony Pictures Imageworks	Won
2021	The Mitchells vs. the Machines	Best Character Design - Feature	Lindsey Olivares	Won
2021	The Mitchells vs. the Machines	Best Direction - Feature	Mike Rianda, Jeff Rowe	Won
2021	The Mitchells vs. the Machines	Best Production Design – Feature	Lindsey Olivares, Toby Wilson, and Dave Bleich	Won
2021	The Mitchells vs. the Machines	Best Voice Acting - Feature	Abbi Jacobson (Katie Mitchell)	Won
2021	The Mitchells vs. the Machines	Best Writing - Feature	Mike Rianda, Jeff Rowe	Won
2021	The Mitchells vs. the Machines	Best Editorial - Feature	Greg Levitan, Collin Wightman, T.J. Young, Tony Ferdinand, and Bret Allen	Won
2021	Wish Dragon	Best Character Design - Feature	Ketan Adikhari	Nominated
2021	Vivo	Best FX – Feature	Martin Furness, Lucy Maxian, Nachiket Pujari, Theodor Vandernoot and Stephanie Molk	Nominated
2021	Vivo	Best Character Design - Feature	Joe Moshier	Nominated
2021	Vivo	Best Music - Feature	Alex Lacamoire, Lin-Manuel Miranda	Nominated
2021	Vivo	Best Production Design – Feature	Carlos Zaragoza, Wendell Dalit and Andy Harkness	Nominated
2021	Vivo	Best Storyboarding - Feature	Carlos Romero	Nominated
2024	Spider-Man: Across the Spider-Verse	Best Animated Feature	Spider-Man: Across the Spider-Verse	Won
2024	Spider-Man: Across the Spider-Verse	Outstanding Achievement for Animated Effects in an Animated Production	Pav Grochola, Filippo Maccari, Naoki Kato, Nicola Finizio and Edmond Boulet-Gilly	Won
2024	Spider-Man: Across the Spider-Verse	Outstanding Achievement for Character Design in an Animated Feature Production	Jesús Alonso Iglesias	Won
2024	Spider-Man: Across the Spider-Verse	Outstanding Achievement for Directing in a Feature Production	Joaquim Dos Santos, Kemp Powers, and Justin K. Thompson	Won
2024	Spider-Man: Across the Spider-Verse	Outstanding Achievement for Editorial in an Animated Feature Production	Spider-Man: Across the Spider-Verse Editorial Team	Won
2024	Spider-Man: Across the Spider-Verse	Outstanding Achievement for Music in a Feature Production	Daniel Pemberton and Metro Boomin	Won
2024	Spider-Man: Across the Spider-Verse	Outstanding Achievement for Production Design in an Animated Feature Production	Patrick O'Keefe and Dean Gordon	Won
2026	KPop Demon Hunters	Best Feature	KPop Demon Hunters	Won
2026	KPop Demon Hunters	Best FX – Feature	Filippo Macari, Nicola Finizio, Simon Lewis, Naoki Kato, Daniel La Chapelle	Won
2026	KPop Demon Hunters	Best Character Animation – Feature	Ryusuke Furuya	Won
2026	KPop Demon Hunters	Best Character Design – Feature	Scott Watanabe and Ami Thompson	Won
2026	KPop Demon Hunters	Best Direction – Feature	Maggie Kang and Chris Appelhans	Won
2026	KPop Demon Hunters	Best Music – Feature	KPop Demon Hunters Music Team	Won
2026	KPop Demon Hunters	Best Production Design – Feature	Helen Chen, Dave Bleich, Wendell Dalit, Scott Watanabe, and Celine Kim	Won
2026	KPop Demon Hunters	Best Voice Acting – Feature	Arden Cho	Won
2026	KPop Demon Hunters	Best Writing – Feature	Danya Jimenez, Hannah McMechan, Maggie Kang, and Chris Appelhans	Won
2026	KPop Demon Hunters	Best Editorial – Feature	KPop Demon Hunters Editorial Team	Won
2026	Fixed	Best Character Design - Feature	Craig Kellman	Nominated

=== Astra Awards ===
Year	Film	Category	Recipient(s)	Result	Ref.
Midseason Film Awards
2021	The Mitchells vs. the Machines	Best Picture		Nominated	
2021	The Mitchells vs. the Machines	Best Filmmaker	Mike Rianda	Nominated	
2021	The Mitchells vs. the Machines	Best Screenplay	Mike Rianda and Jeff Rowe	Won	
2023	Spider-Man: Across the Spider-Verse	Best Picture		Won	
2023	Spider-Man: Across the Spider-Verse	Best Director	Joaquim Dos Santos, Kemp Powers, and Justin K. Thompson	Won	
2023	Spider-Man: Across the Spider-Verse	Best Screenplay	Phil Lord, Christopher Miller, and David Callaham	Nominated	
Film and Creative Arts Awards
2021	The Mitchells vs. the Machines	Best Animated Film		Won	
2021	The Mitchells vs. the Machines	Best Animated or VFX Performance	Abbi Jacobson	Nominated	
2023	Spider-Man: Across the Spider-Verse	Best Picture		Nominated	
2023	Spider-Man: Across the Spider-Verse	Best Adapted Screenplay	Phil Lord, Christopher Miller, and David Callaham	Nominated	
2023	Spider-Man: Across the Spider-Verse	Best Voice Over Performance	Hailee Steinfeld	Won	
2023	Spider-Man: Across the Spider-Verse	Best Voice Over Performance	Daniel Kaluuya	Nominated	
2023	Spider-Man: Across the Spider-Verse	Best Voice Over Performance	Shameik Moore	Nominated	
2023	Spider-Man: Across the Spider-Verse	Best Animated Feature		Won	
2023	Spider-Man: Across the Spider-Verse	Best Editing	Michael Andrews	Nominated	
2023	Spider-Man: Across the Spider-Verse	Best Score	Daniel Pemberton	Nominated	
2023	Spider-Man: Across the Spider-Verse	Best Sound		Nominated	
2023	Spider-Man: Across the Spider-Verse	Best Visual Effects		Won	
2025	KPop Demon Hunters	Best Animated Feature		Won	
2025	KPop Demon Hunters	Best Voice Over Performance	Arden Cho	Won	
2025	KPop Demon Hunters	Best Original Song	"Golden" – Ejae, Mark Sonnenblick, Ido, 24, and Teddy	Won	
2025	KPop Demon Hunters	Best Sound	Michael Babcock, Tony Lamberti, Jeff Sawyer, Katie Halliday, Chris Diebold, and Trevor Gates	Nominated	

=== Critics' Choice Movie Awards ===
Year	Film	Category	Recipient(s)	Result	Ref.
2009	Cloudy with a Chance of Meatballs	Best Animated Feature	Phil Lord and Christopher Miller	Nominated	
2011	Arthur Christmas	Best Animated Feature	Sarah Smith	Nominated	
2018	Spider-Man: Into the Spider-Verse	Best Animated Feature	Bob Persichetti, Peter Ramsey and Rodney Rothman	Won	
2021	The Mitchells vs. the Machines	Best Animated Feature	Mike Rianda	Won	
2023	Spider-Man: Across the Spider-Verse	Best Animated Feature	Joaquim Dos Santos, Kemp Powers and Justin K. Thompson	Won	
2023	Spider-Man: Across the Spider-Verse	Best Score	Daniel Pemberton	Nominated	
2023	Spider-Man: Across the Spider-Verse	Best Visual Effects	Pav Grochola, Filippo Maccari, Naoki Kato, Nicola Finizio, and Edmond Boulet-Gilly	Nominated	
2025	KPop Demon Hunters	Best Animated Feature	Maggie Kang and Chris Appelhans	Won	
2025	KPop Demon Hunters	Best Song	"Golden" — Ejae, Mark Sonnenblick, Joong Gyu Kwak, Yu Han Lee, Hee Dong Nam, Jeong Hoon Seon, and Teddy Park	Won	

=== Detroit Film Critics Society ===
Year	Film	Category	Result	Ref.
2018	Spider-Man: Into the Spider-Verse	Best Animated Feature	Won	
2021	The Mitchells vs. the Machines	Best Animated Feature	Won	

=== Golden Globe Awards ===
Year	Film	Category	Recipients(s)	Result	Ref.
2009	Cloudy with a Chance of Meatballs	Best Animated Feature Film	Phil Lord and Christopher Miller	Nominated	
2011	Arthur Christmas	Best Animated Feature Film	Sarah Smith	Nominated	
2012	Hotel Transylvania	Best Animated Feature Film	Genndy Tartakovsky	Nominated	
2017	The Star	Best Original Song	"The Star" – Mariah Carey, Marc Shaiman	Nominated	
2018	Spider-Man: Into the Spider-Verse	Best Animated Feature Film	Bob Persichetti, Peter Ramsey and Rodney Rothman	Won	
2023	Spider-Man: Across the Spider-Verse	Best Animated Feature Film	Joaquim Dos Santos, Kemp Powers and Justin K. Thompson	Nominated	
2023	Spider-Man: Across the Spider-Verse	Cinematic and Box Office Achievement	Avi Arad, Phil Lord, Christopher Miller, Amy Pascal, Christina Steinberg	Nominated	
2023	Spider-Man: Across the Spider-Verse	Best Original Score	Daniel Pemberton	Nominated	
2025	KPop Demon Hunters	Best Animated Feature Film	Maggie Kang and Chris Appelhans	Won	
2025	KPop Demon Hunters	Cinematic and Box Office Achievement	Michelle Wong	Nominated	
2025	KPop Demon Hunters	Best Original Song	"Golden" – Ejae, Mark Sonnenblick, Ido, 24, and Teddy	Won	

=== Golden Raspberry Awards ===
Year	Film	Category	Recipient(s)	Result
2013	The Smurfs 2	Worst Prequel, Remake, Rip-off or Sequel	Jordan Kerner	Nominated
2017	The Emoji Movie	Worst Picture	Michelle Raimo Kouyate	Won
2017	The Emoji Movie	Worst Director	Tony Leondis	Won
2017	The Emoji Movie	Worst Screenplay	Tony Leondis, Eric Siegel and Mike White	Won
2017	The Emoji Movie	Worst Screen Combo	Any two obnoxious emojis	Won
2017	The Emoji Movie	The Razzie Nominee So Rotten You Loved It	The Emoji Movie	Nominated
2018	Spider-Man: Into the Spider-Verse	Razzie Redeemer Award	Sony Pictures Animation	Nominated

=== Hollywood Music in Media Awards ===
Year	Film	Category	Recipient(s)	Result	Ref.
2015	Hotel Transylvania 2	Original Score – Animated Film	Mark Mothersbaugh	Nominated	
2017	Smurfs: The Lost Village	Original Song – Animated Film	"I'm a Lady" – Martin René & Meghan Trainor	Nominated	
2017	Smurfs: The Lost Village	Original Song – Animated Film	"You Will Always Find Me in Your Heart" – Christopher Lennertz and KT Tunstall	Nominated	
2018	Peter Rabbit	Original Song – Animated Film	"I Promise You" – Ezra Koenig	Nominated	
2021	The Mitchells vs. the Machines	Original Score – Animated Film	Mark Mothersbaugh	Nominated	
2021	The Mitchells vs. the Machines	Original Song – Animated Film	"On My Way" – Alex Lahey, Sophie Payten and Gab Strum	Nominated	
2021	Vivo	Original Score – Animated Film	Alex Lacamoire	Nominated	
2023	Spider-Man: Across the Spider-Verse	Original Score – Animated Film	Daniel Pemberton	Won	
2023	Spider-Man: Across the Spider-Verse	Original Song – Animated Film	"Am I Dreaming" – Mike Dean, Peter Lee Johnson, Rakim Mayers, Roisee, Landon Wayne, and Leland Wayne	Nominated	
2023	Spider-Man: Across the Spider-Verse	Soundtrack Album	Boominati Worldwide and Republic Records	Nominated	
2025	KPop Demon Hunters	Original Song – Animated Film	"Golden" – Ejae, Mark Sonnenblick, Joong Gyu Kwak, Yu Han Lee, Hee Dong Nam, Jeong Hoon Seo, and Park Hong Jun	Won	
2025	KPop Demon Hunters	Song – Onscreen Performance (Film)	"Golden" – Ejae, Rei Ami, and Audrey Nuna (Huntrix)	Nominated	
2025	KPop Demon Hunters	Soundtrack Album	Republic Records	Nominated	

=== Houston Film Critics Society ===
Years	Film	Category	Result
2011	The Smurfs	Worst Picture	Nominated
2018	Spider-Man: Into the Spider-Verse	Best Animated Feature Film	Nominated
2021	The Mitchells vs. the Machines	Best Animated Feature Film	Won

=== Kids' Choice Awards ===
Year	Film	Category	Recipient(s)	Result
2006	Open Season	Favorite Voice from an Animated Movie	Ashton Kutcher	Nominated
2011	The Smurfs	Favorite Movie	The Smurfs	Nominated
2011	The Smurfs	Favorite Movie Actress	Sofía Vergara	Nominated
2011	The Smurfs	Favorite Voice from an Animated Movie	Katy Perry	Won
2012	Hotel Transylvania	Favorite Voice from an Animated Movie	Adam Sandler	Won
2013	The Smurfs 2	Favorite Movie	The Smurfs 2	Nominated
2013	The Smurfs 2	Favorite Movie Actor	Neil Patrick Harris	Nominated
2013	The Smurfs 2	Favorite Movie Actress	Jayma Mays	Nominated
2013	The Smurfs 2	Favorite Voice from an Animated Movie	Katy Perry	Nominated
2013	Cloudy with a Chance of Meatballs 2	Favorite Animated Movie	Cloudy with a Chance of Meatballs 2	Nominated
2015	Hotel Transylvania 2	Favorite Animated Movie	Hotel Transylvania 2	Won
2015	Hotel Transylvania 2	Favorite Voice from an Animated Movie	Selena Gomez	Nominated
2017	Smurfs: The Lost Village	Favorite Animated Movie	Smurfs: The Lost Village	Nominated
2017	The Emoji Movie	Favorite Animated Movie	The Emoji Movie	Nominated
2018	Peter Rabbit	Favorite Animated Movie	Peter Rabbit	Nominated
2018	Peter Rabbit	Favorite Male Voice from an Animated Movie	James Corden	Nominated
2018	Hotel Transylvania 3: Summer Vacation	Favorite Animated Movie	Hotel Transylvania 3: Summer Vacation	Nominated
2018	Hotel Transylvania 3: Summer Vacation	Favorite Male Voice from an Animated Movie	Adam Sandler	Won
2018	Hotel Transylvania 3: Summer Vacation	Favorite Male Voice from an Animated Movie	Andy Samberg	Nominated
2018	Hotel Transylvania 3: Summer Vacation	Favorite Female Voice from an Animated Movie	Selena Gomez	Won
2018	Spider-Man: Into the Spider-Verse	Favorite Animated Movie	Spider-Man: Into the Spider-Verse	Nominated
2018	Spider-Man: Into the Spider-Verse	Favorite Male Voice from an Animated Movie	Shameik Moore	Nominated
2018	Spider-Man: Into the Spider-Verse	Favorite Female Voice from an Animated Movie	Hailee Steinfeld	Nominated
2019	The Angry Birds Movie 2	Favorite Animated Movie	The Angry Birds Movie 2	Nominated
2019	The Angry Birds Movie 2	Favorite Male Voice from an Animated Movie	Josh Gad	Won
2022	Hotel Transylvania: Transformania	Favorite Animated Movie	Hotel Transylvania: Transformania	Nominated
2022	Hotel Transylvania: Transformania	Favorite Male Voice from an Animated Movie	Andy Samberg	Nominated
2022	Hotel Transylvania: Transformania	Favorite Female Voice from an Animated Movie	Selena Gomez	Won
2023	Spider-Man: Across the Spider-Verse	Favorite Animated Movie	Spider-Man: Across the Spider-Verse	Won
2023	Spider-Man: Across the Spider-Verse	Favorite Male Voice from an Animated Movie	Shameik Moore	Nominated
2023	Spider-Man: Across the Spider-Verse	Favorite Female Voice from an Animated Movie	Hailee Steinfeld	Nominated

=== People's Choice Awards ===
Year	Film	Category	Recipient(s)	Result
2011	The Smurfs	Favorite Animated Movie Voice	Katy Perry	Nominated
2018	Hotel Transylvania 3: Summer Vacation	The Family Movie of the Year	Hotel Transylvania 3: Summer Vacation	Nominated
2019	The Angry Birds Movie 2	The Family Movie of the Year	The Angry Birds Movie 2	Nominated
2019	The Angry Birds Movie 2	Animated Movie Star of 2019	Awkwafina	Nominated
2021	The Mitchells vs. the Machines	The Family Movie of the Year	The Mitchells vs. the Machines	Nominated
2021	Vivo	The Family Movie of the Year	Vivo	Nominated
2023	Spider-Man: Across the Spider-Verse	The Movie of the Year	Spider-Man: Across the Spider-Verse	Nominated

=== St. Louis Gateway Film Critics Association Awards ===
Year	Film	Category	Recipient(s)	Result
2009	Cloudy with a Chance of Meatballs	Best Animated Feature	Cloudy with a Chance of Meatballs	Nominated
2018	Hotel Transylvania 3: Summer Vacation	Best Animated Feature	Hotel Transylvania 3: Summer Vacation	Nominated
2018	Spider-Man: Into the Spider-Verse	Best Animated Feature	Spider-Man: Into the Spider-Verse	Won
2021	The Mitchells vs. the Machines	Best Animated Feature	The Mitchells vs. the Machines	Won
2021	The Mitchells vs. the Machines	Best Comedy Film	The Mitchells vs. the Machines	Nominated
2021	Vivo	Best Animated Feature	Vivo	Nominated
2023	Spider-Man: Across the Spider-Verse	Best Animated Feature	Spider-Man: Across the Spider-Verse	Won
2023	Spider-Man: Across the Spider-Verse	Best Original Score	Daniel Pemberton	Nominated
2023	Spider-Man: Across the Spider-Verse	Best Action Film	Spider-Man: Across the Spider-Verse	Nominated
2025	KPop Demon Hunters	Best Animated Feature	KPop Demon Hunters	Runner-up
2025	KPop Demon Hunters	Best Music Soundtrack	KPop Demon Hunters	Runner-up
2025	KPop Demon Hunters	Best Vocal Performance	Arden Cho	Runner-up

=== Washington D.C. Area Film Critics Association ===
Year	Film	Category	Recipients(s)	Result
2007	Surf's Up	Best Animated Feature	Ash Brannon and Chris Buck	Nominated
2012	Hotel Transylvania	Best Animated Feature	Genndy Tartakovsky	Nominated
2015	Hotel Transylvania 2	Best Animated Feature	Genndy Tartakovsky	Nominated
2018	Spider-Man: Into the Spider-Verse	Best Animated Feature	Bob Persichetti, Peter Ramsey, and Rodney Rothman	Nominated
2018	Spider-Man: Into the Spider-Verse	Best Voice Performance	Shameik Moore	Nominated
2021	The Mitchells vs. the Machines	Best Animated Feature	Mike Rianda	Won
2021	The Mitchells vs. the Machines	Best Voice Performance	Abbi Jacobson	Nominated
2023	Spider-Man: Into the Spider-Verse	Best Animated Feature	Kemp Powers and Joaquim Dos Santos	Won
2023	Spider-Man: Into the Spider-Verse	Best Voice Performance	Shameik Moore	Won
2023	Spider-Man: Into the Spider-Verse	Best Voice Performance	Daniel Kaluuya	Nominated
2023	Spider-Man: Into the Spider-Verse	Best Voice Performance	Hailee Steinfeld	Nominated
2025	KPop Demon Hunters	Best Animated Feature	Maggie Kang and Chris Appelhans	Won
2025	KPop Demon Hunters	Best Voice Performance	Arden Cho	Won

== See also ==
- List of Sony theatrical animated feature films
