= List of Sony theatrical animated feature films =

Logo of Sony Pictures Animation

This list of theatrical animated feature films consists of animated films produced or released by Sony Pictures, the film division of Sony.

Sony releases films from Sony-owned and non-Sony owned animation studios. Most films listed below are from Sony Pictures Animation which began as a feature animation department of Sony, producing its first feature-length animated film Open Season in 2006. Beginning with 1001 Arabian Nights in 1959, Columbia Pictures and TriStar Pictures have released animated films by other production companies, such as United Productions of America, Aardman Animations, Marvel Entertainment, Madhouse, Aniplex, Funimation, Crunchyroll and Rovio Animation. Additionally, Sony Pictures's Japanese division has helped co-produce and release anime films in that country, such as Cowboy Bebop: The Movie, Tokyo Godfathers, Paprika, Legend of the Millennium Dragon and Marvel Anime Films etc.

Other Studio units have also released films theatrically, primarily the studio's distribution unit Sony Pictures Releasing, which acquires film rights from outside animation studios to release films under the Columbia Pictures or TriStar Pictures film labels.

== Films ==
Color legend
Madhouse (1996–present)	
SPE Visual Works (1997); Aniplex (2007–present)	
Sony Pictures Animation (2006–present)	
Funimation Films (2017–22)	
Crunchyroll Films (2022–present)	
Other Sony studio	
Third-party studio	
An adult animated production	^{A}
Distribution only	^{D}
Live-action/animation hybrid sold as animation	^{S}

=== American releases ===
Title	Original theatrical release date (Note: Listed are the original theatrical release dates in the United States (or other non-U.S. territories) when the film was contributed by Sony. Different distributors are attributed and credited for distributing each film throughout the history of Sony.)	Animation studio
1001 Arabian Nights	December 1, 1959	United Productions of America (UPA)
The Little Prince and the Eight-Headed Dragon^{[D]}	January 1, 1964 (Note: Original release date was March 24, 1963)	Toei Animation
Hey There, It's Yogi Bear!^{[D]}	June 3, 1964	Hanna-Barbera
The Magic World of Topo Gigio^{[D]}	November 26, 1965 (Note: Original release date was 1961)	Cinecidi
The Man Called Flintstone^{[D]}	August 3, 1966	Hanna-Barbera
Jack and the Beanstalk^{[D]}	February 13, 1976 (Note: Original release date was July 20, 1974)	Group TAC
American Pop^{[A]}	February 13, 1981	Bakshi Productions
Heavy Metal^{[A]}	August 7, 1981	Potterton Productions
Care Bears Movie II: A New Generation	March 21, 1986	Nelvana, LBS Communications and Those Characters from Cleveland
Pound Puppies and the Legend of Big Paw^{[D]}	March 18, 1988	Carolco Pictures, Atlantic/Kushner-Locke, The Maltese Companies, Cuckoo's Nest Studio, Wang Film Productions and Tonka (Note: Released by TriStar Pictures.)
Heavy Metal 2000^{[A]}	July 10, 2000	CinéGroupe
The Trumpet of the Swan	May 11, 2001	Nest Family Entertainment and RichCrest Animation Studios
Final Fantasy: The Spirits Within^{[A]}	July 11, 2001	Square Pictures
Metropolis^{[A]}^{[D]}	January 25, 2002 (Note: Original release date was May 26, 2001)	Madhouse
Eight Crazy Nights^{[A]}	November 27, 2002	Happy Madison Productions
The Triplets of Belleville^{[A]}^{[D]}	February 13, 2004 (Note: Original release date was June 11, 2003) (Note: Released by Sony Pictures in the United States.)	Les Armateurs (Note: Released by Sony Pictures Classics.)
Steamboy^{[A]}^{[D]}	March 18, 2005 (Note: Original release date was July 17, 2004)	Sunrise (Note: Released by Triumph Films.)
Monster House	July 21, 2006	ImageMovers and Amblin Entertainment
Open Season	September 29, 2006	Sony Pictures Animation
Surf's Up	June 8, 2007	Sony Pictures Animation
Paprika^{[A]}^{[D]}	June 22, 2007	Madhouse
Tekkonkinkreet^{[A]}^{[D]}	July 13, 2007	Aniplex
Persepolis^{[A]}^{[D]}	December 25, 2007 (Note: Original release date was June 27, 2007)	The Kennedy/Marshall Company
The Sky Crawlers^{[D]}	August 2, 2008	Production I.G and Warner Bros. Japan
Waltz with Bashir^{[A]}^{[D]}	August 29, 2008 (Note: Original release date was June 5, 2008)	Razor Film Produktion
Cloudy with a Chance of Meatballs	September 18, 2009	Sony Pictures Animation
Planet 51^{[D]}	November 20, 2009	Ilion Animation Studios
The Illusionist^{[D]}	February 11, 2011	Django Films, Pathé and Warner Bros.
The Smurfs^{[S]}	July 29, 2011	Sony Pictures Animation and The Kerner Entertainment Company
Arthur Christmas^{[D]}	November 23, 2011	Sony Pictures Animation and Aardman Animations
The Pirates! In an Adventure with Scientists!^{[D]}	April 27, 2012	Sony Pictures Animation and Aardman Animations
Hotel Transylvania	September 28, 2012	Sony Pictures Animation
The Smurfs 2^{[S]}	July 31, 2013	Sony Pictures Animation and The Kerner Entertainment Company
Cloudy with a Chance of Meatballs 2	September 27, 2013	Sony Pictures Animation
Pixels^{[S]}	July 24, 2015	Happy Madison Productions, 1492 Pictures, LStar Capital, China Film Group and Film Croppers Entertainment
Hotel Transylvania 2	September 25, 2015	Sony Pictures Animation, LStar Capital and MRC
Goosebumps^{[S]}	October 16, 2015	Sony Pictures Animation, Village Roadshow Pictures, Original Film, Scholastic Entertainment and LStar Capital
The Angry Birds Movie	May 20, 2016	Rovio Animation
Sausage Party^{[A]}	August 12, 2016	Annapurna Pictures, Point Grey Pictures and Nitrogen Studios
The Red Turtle^{[D]}	January 20, 2017 (Note: Original release date was June 29, 2016)	Studio Ghibli
Smurfs: The Lost Village	April 7, 2017	Sony Pictures Animation, The Kerner Entertainment Company, LStar Capital and Wanda Pictures
The Emoji Movie	July 28, 2017	Sony Pictures Animation
The Star	November 17, 2017	Sony Pictures Animation, Affirm Films, Walden Media, The Jim Henson Company and Franklin Entertainment
Peter Rabbit^{[S]}	February 9, 2018	Sony Pictures Animation, Olive Bridge Entertainment, Animal Logic, 2.0 Entertainment and Screen Australia
Hotel Transylvania 3: Summer Vacation	July 13, 2018	Sony Pictures Animation and MRC
Goosebumps 2: Haunted Halloween^{[S]}	October 12, 2018	Sony Pictures Animation, Original Film, Scholastic Entertainment and Silvertongue Films
Spider-Man: Into the Spider-Verse	December 14, 2018	Sony Pictures Animation, Marvel Entertainment, Arad Productions, Lord Miller Productions and Pascal Pictures
Ruben Brandt, Collector^{[D]}	February 15, 2019 (Note: Original release date was June 22, 2018)	Ruben Brandt Production
The Angry Birds Movie 2	August 14, 2019	Sony Pictures Animation and Rovio Entertainment
The Mitchells vs. the Machines	April 23, 2021	Sony Pictures Animation, Lord Miller Productions and One Cool Films
Wish Dragon	June 11, 2021	Sony Pictures Animation, Flagship Entertainment, Base FX and Tencent Pictures
Peter Rabbit 2: The Runaway^{[D]}^{[S]}	June 18, 2021	Animal Logic, MRC, 2.0 Entertainment and Olive Bridge Entertainment
Vivo	August 6, 2021	Sony Pictures Animation and One Cool Films
Hotel Transylvania: Transformania	January 14, 2022	Sony Pictures Animation and MRC
Spider-Man: Across the Spider-Verse	June 2, 2023	Sony Pictures Animation, Marvel Entertainment, Arad Productions, Lord Miller Productions and Pascal Pictures
The Peasants^{[A]}^{[D]}	January 26, 2024 (Note: Original release date was October 13, 2023)	BreakThru Films, DigitalKraft, and Artshot
The Garfield Movie^{[D]}	May 24, 2024	Alcon Entertainment, Paws, Inc. and DNEG Animation
Harold and the Purple Crayon^{[D]}^{[S]}	August 2, 2024	Davis Entertainment and Scholastic Entertainment
Paddington in Peru^{[D]}^{[S]}	February 14, 2025 (Note: Original release date was November 8, 2025)	StudioCanal and Marmalade Pictures
KPop Demon Hunters	June 20, 2025	Sony Pictures Animation
Fixed^{[A]}	August 13, 2025	Sony Pictures Animation and Renegade Animation
Scarlet^{[A]}^{[D]}	February 6, 2026 (Note: Original release date was November 21, 2025)	Studio Chizu
Goat	February 13, 2026	Sony Pictures Animation, Unanimous Media and Modern Magic
A Magnificent Life^{[A]}^{[D]}	March 27, 2026 (Note: Original release date was October 15, 2025)	Mediawan, What The Prod, Bidibul Productions and Walking The Dog

=== International releases ===
Title	Original theatrical release date (Note: Listed are the original theatrical release dates in the United States (or other non-U.S. territories) when the film was contributed by Sony. Different distributors are attributed and credited for distributing each film throughout the history of Sony.)	Animation studio
Hugo the Hippo	December 28, 1979 (Mexico)	Brut Productions and Pannónia Filmstúdió
The Swan Princess	November 18, 1994	Nest Entertainment and Rich Animation Studios
Memories^{[A]}	March 28, 1996 (Note: Original release date was December 23, 1995)	Madhouse
Rurouni Kenshin: The Motion Picture^{[A]}	December 20, 1997	SPE Visual Works and Gallop
Pippi Longstocking^{[D]}	January 22, 1998 (Germany)	Nelvana Limited, AB Svensk Filmindustri, IdunaFilm and TFC Trickompany
Manuelita	July 8, 1999	Producciones García Ferré and Telefe
The Legend of the Unicorn	December 7, 2001	Extra Extremadura de Audiovisuales S.A.
Cowboy Bebop: The Movie^{[A]}^{[D]}	May 16, 2003 (Note: Original release date was September 1, 2001) (Note: Also released by Sony in North America)	Bones and Sunrise (Note: Released by Destination Films.)
Tokyo Godfathers^{[A]}	November 8, 2003	Madhouse
Final Fantasy VII: Advent Children^{[A]}	September 14, 2005	Square Enix Holdings and Visual Works
Resident Evil: Degeneration^{[A]}	October 18, 2008	Digital Frontier
Open Season 2	January 27, 2009 (Note: Not released theatrically in the United States)	Sony Pictures Animation
First Squad: The Moment of Truth	October 15, 2009	Studio 4°C
Open Season 3	January 25, 2011	Sony Pictures Animation
Legend of the Millennium Dragon	April 29, 2011	Studio Pierrot
The Adventures of Tintin^{[D]}	December 21, 2011	Amblin Entertainment, Paramount Pictures, Nickelodeon Movies, Hemisphere Media Capital and WingNut Films
Zambezia	July 3, 2012	Triggerfish Animation Studios (Note: Released by Cinema Management Group outside North America)
Starship Troopers: Invasion^{[A]}	July 21, 2012	Stage 6 Films
Resident Evil: Damnation^{[A]}	October 27, 2012	Digital Frontier
Iron Man: Rise of Technovore^{[D]}	April 24, 2013	Madhouse and Marvel Entertainment
Avengers Confidential: Black Widow & Punisher^{[D]}	March 25, 2014	Madhouse and Marvel Entertainment
Open Season: Scared Silly	March 8, 2016	Sony Pictures Animation
Kingsglaive: Final Fantasy XV^{[A]}	July 9, 2016 (Note: Released by Stage 6 Films)	Aniplex and Visual Works
Your Name	April 22, 2017 (Note: Original release date was August 26, 2016)	Toho (English dub handled by Funimation Films)
Sword Art Online The Movie: Ordinal Scale	April 22, 2017	Aniplex (Note: Released by Kadokawa in Japan)
Resident Evil: Vendetta^{[A]}	June 19, 2017	Stage 6 Films
Starship Troopers: Traitor of Mars^{[A]}	August 21, 2017	Stage 6 Films
My Hero Academia: Two Heroes	September 25, 2018 (Note: Original release date was August 3, 2018)	Funimation Films, Bones and Toho Animation
Rascal Does Not Dream of a Dreaming Girl^{[D]}	October 2, 2019 (Note: Original release date was June 15, 2018)	Aniplex and Funimation Films
Tabaluga^{[D]}	December 27, 2019	Awesometown Entertainment, Tempest Film and Trixter
Goblin Slayer: Goblin's Crown	February 1, 2020	White Fox
My Hero Academia: Heroes Rising^{[D]}	February 26, 2020 (Note: Original release date was December 20, 2019)	Funimation Films, Bones and Toho Animation
The Barkers: Mind the Cats!^{[D]}	December 24, 2020	Melnitsa Animation Studio and CTB Film Company
Horse Julius and Big Horse Racing	December 31, 2020	Melnitsa Animation Studio and CTB Film Company
Secret Magic Control Agency	March 18, 2021	Wizart Animation, QED International and CTB Film Company
Violet Evergarden: The Movie	March 30, 2021 (Note: Original release date was September 18, 2020)	Funimation Films and Kyoto Animation
Demon Slayer: Kimetsu no Yaiba – The Movie: Mugen Train^{[A]}	April 23, 2021 (Note: Original release date was October 16, 2020)	Aniplex and Funimation Films
Josee, the Tiger and the Fish	July 12, 2021 (Note: Original release date was December 25, 2020)	Funimation Films and Bones (Note: Released by Shochiku in Japan)
Sing a Bit of Harmony	October 29, 2021	Funimation Films and JC Staff
My Hero Academia: World Heroes' Mission	October 29, 2021	Funimation Films, Bones and Toho Animation
Sword Art Online Progressive: Aria of a Starless Night	December 3, 2021 (Note: Original release date was October 30, 2021)	Aniplex and Funimation Films
Chickenhare and the Hamster of Darkness^{[D]}	February 16, 2022	NWave Pictures
Jujutsu Kaisen 0^{[A]}	March 18, 2022 (Note: Original release date was December 24, 2021)	Funimation Films and Crunchyroll
Dragon Ball Super: Super Hero	August 19, 2022 (Note: Original release date was June 11, 2022)	Crunchyroll Films and Toei Animation
One Piece Film: Red	November 4, 2022 (Note: Original release date was August 6, 2022)	Crunchyroll Films and Toei Animation
The Quintessential Quintuplets Movie	December 7, 2022 (Note: Original release date was May 20, 2022)	Crunchyroll Films and Bibury Animation Studios
That Time I Got Reincarnated as a Slime the Movie: Scarlet Bond	January 20, 2023 (Note: Original release date was November 25, 2022)	Crunchyroll Films and Eight Bit Co., Ltd.
Sword Art Online Progressive: Scherzo of Deep Night	February 3, 2023 (Note: Original release date was November 11, 2022)	Aniplex and Crunchyroll Films
Kaguya-sama: Love Is War – The First Kiss That Never Ends	February 14, 2023 (Note: Original release date was December 27, 2022)	Aniplex
Demon Slayer: Kimetsu no Yaiba – To the Swordsmith Village^{[A]}	March 3, 2023 (Note: Original release date was February 3, 2022)	Aniplex
Suzume	April 14, 2023 (Note: Original release date was November 11, 2022)	Crunchyroll Films and Toho (Note: Released by Wild Bunch in Europe territories)
Resident Evil: Death Island^{[A]}	July 7, 2023	TMS Entertainment
Psycho-Pass Providence^{[A]}	July 14, 2023 (Note: Original release date was May 30, 2023)	Crunchyroll Films and Toho Animation
Kaina of the Great Snow Sea: Star Sage	October 13, 2023	Polygon Pictures
The Boy and the Heron	December 7, 2023 (Australia)	Studio Ghibli
Demon Slayer: Kimetsu no Yaiba – To the Hashira Training^{[A]}	February 23, 2024 (Note: Original release date was February 2, 2024)	Aniplex
Rascal Does Not Dream of a Sister Venturing Out	March 24, 2024 (Note: Original release date was June 23, 2023) (Note: Original release date was December 1, 2023)	Aniplex
Rascal Does Not Dream of a Knapsack Kid	March 24, 2024	Aniplex
Spy × Family Code: White	April 19, 2024 (Note: Original release date was December 22, 2023)	Crunchyroll Films and Toho Animation
Haikyu!! The Dumpster Battle	May 31, 2024 (Note: Original release date was February 16, 2024)	Crunchyroll Films, Production I.G and Toho Animation
Blue Lock The Movie -Episode Nagi-	June 28, 2024 (Note: Original release date was April 19, 2024)	Crunchyroll Films and Kodansha
Kizumonogatari: Koyomi Vamp^{[A]}	August 28, 2024 (Note: Original release date was January 12, 2024)	Aniplex
The Concierge	September 11, 2024 (Note: Original release date was October 20, 2023)	Aniplex and Crunchyroll Films
My Hero Academia: You're Next	October 11, 2024 (Note: Original release date was August 2, 2024)	Crunchyroll Films, Bones and Toho Animation (Note: Released by Toho International in United States)
Overlord: The Sacred Kingdom	November 8, 2024 (Note: Original release date was September 20, 2024)	Madhouse and Crunchyroll Films
Jujutsu Kaisen: Hidden Inventory / Premature Death – The Movie^{[A]}	July 16, 2025 (Note: Original release date was May 30, 2025)	Crunchyroll Films, MAPPA and Toho Animation (Note: Released by GKIDS in United States)
Demon Slayer: Kimetsu no Yaiba – The Movie: Infinity Castle^{[A]}	September 12, 2025 (Note: Original release date was July 18, 2025)	Aniplex and Crunchyroll Films
Chickenhare and the Secret of the Groundhog^{[D]}	October 15, 2025	NWave Pictures
Miss Kobayashi's Dragon Maid: A Lonely Dragon Wants to Be Loved	October 20, 2025 (Note: Original release date was June 14, 2025)	Crunchyroll Films and Kyoto Animation
Chainsaw Man – The Movie: Reze Arc^{[A]}	October 24, 2025 (Note: Original release date was September 19, 2025)	Crunchyroll Films, MAPPA and Toho
Jujutsu Kaisen: Execution – Shibuya Incident x The Culling Game Begins^{[A]}	December 5, 2025 (Note: Original release date was November 7, 2025)	Crunchyroll Films, MAPPA and Toho Animation
Zombie Land Saga: Yumeginga Paradise	January 19, 2026 (Note: Original release date was October 24, 2025)	Crunchyroll Films, MAPPA and Toei Company
That Time I Got Reincarnated as a Slime the Movie: Tears of the Azure Sea	May 1, 2026 (Note: Original release date was February 27, 2026)	Crunchyroll Films and Eight Bit Co., Ltd.
The Irregular at Magic High School THE MOVIE -Yotsuba Succession Arc	November 1, 2026 (Note: Original release date was May 8, 2026)	Aniplex and Eight Bit Co., Ltd.

=== Upcoming ===
Title	Intended theatrical release date by Sony Pictures Releasing	Animation studio
Iron Boy^{[D]}	January 22, 2027 (Note: Original release date was October 14, 2026)	Beside Production, RTBF, Eddy Cinéma, Regular Production, France 3 and Auvergne-Rhône-Alpes Cinema
Spider-Man: Beyond the Spider-Verse	June 18, 2027	Sony Pictures Animation, Marvel Entertainment, Arad Productions, Lord Miller Productions and Pascal Pictures
The Haunting of Hotel Transylvania	October 8, 2027 (Note: Released by Sony Pictures in North America and most territories.)	Sony Pictures Animation and Amazon MGM Studios
Charlie vs. The Chocolate Factory^{[D]}	November 5, 2027 (Note: Released by Sony Pictures outside North America)	Netflix Animation Studios and The Roald Dahl Story Company
Buds	December 22, 2027	Sony Pictures Animation
Undated
KPop Demon Hunters 2	2029	Sony Pictures Animation
Bloodborne^{[A]}	TBA	Lyrical Animation and PlayStation Productions

== Highest-grossing films ==
This list does not include films combining live-action with animation.

Rank	Film	Gross	Studio	Year	Ref.
1	Demon Slayer: Kimetsu no Yaiba – The Movie: Infinity Castle	$780,032,503	Aniplex and Crunchyroll Films	2025	
2	Spider-Man: Across the Spider-Verse	$690,897,910	Sony Pictures Animation and Marvel Entertainment	2023	
3	Hotel Transylvania 3: Summer Vacation	$528,583,774	Sony Pictures Animation	2018	
4	Demon Slayer: Kimetsu no Yaiba – The Movie: Mugen Train	$507,076,686	Aniplex and Funimation Films	2021	
5	Hotel Transylvania 2	$473,226,958	Sony Pictures Animation	2015	
6	Your Name	$405,349,022	Funimation Films and Toho	2017	
7	Spider-Man: Into the Spider-Verse	$384,298,736	Sony Pictures Animation and Marvel Entertainment	2018	
8	The Adventures of Tintin	$373,993,951	Nickelodeon Movies, Amblin Entertainment and Paramount Pictures	2011	
9	Hotel Transylvania	$358,375,603	Sony Pictures Animation	2012	
10	The Angry Birds Movie	$352,333,929	Rovio Animation	2016	

== Notes ==
Release notes

Studio/production notes

Film rights notes
