= Things You Shouldn't Say Past Midnight =

2000 American play written by Peter Ackerman

Things You Should Say Past Midnight
- Original language: English
- Written by: Peter Ackerman
- Genre: Drama, comedy

Premiere
- Date: 2000

Things You Shouldn't Say Past Midnight is a 2000 American play written by Peter Ackerman.

In 2014 DirecTV picked up 10 episodes of original comedy based on Things You Shouldn't Say Past Midnight to be adapted into a television series.

== Plot ==
Set in modern Los Angeles, the story of a variety of relationships told through the concept that nothing good ever happens after midnight.
