= Chickenhare =

Graphic novel series by Chris Grine

- Cover of Chickenhare Volume 1 - The House of Klaus

Publication information
- Publisher: 1-2: Dark Horse Comics; 3: Self-published
- Format: Ongoing series
- Genre: Action/adventure, humor/comedy
- Publication date: September 27, 2006 - present
- No. of issues: 3
- Main character(s): Chickenhare, Abe

Creative team
- Written by: Chris Grine
- Artist: Chris Grine

Chickenhare is a series of graphic novels, written and illustrated by the American author Chris Grine. The first two books were published by Dark Horse Comics, and the third was being released on-line as a web comic since November 2009, before its cancellation.

The series follows the story of Chickenhare, a rare and exotic cross between a chicken and a rabbit, and his bearded box turtle friend, Abe.

== Volumes ==
Volume	Title	Original ed.	Color ed.
1	The House of Klaus	September 27, 2006	February 1, 2013
2	Fire in the Hole	April 9, 2008	
3	Fish & Grymps	November 22, 2009 – cancelled	

=== The House of Klaus ===
The first installment in the series is titled Chickenhare: The House of Klaus in which we are introduced to the Chickenhare universe as well as a few major characters, Banjo, a monkey and Meg, her species remains a mystery. One new race has also been introduced, the Shromph.

On February 1, 2013, Scholastic (through its Graphix imprint) reissued the book in full color. The color edition, named Chickenhare, featured new cover design, a new logo and additional new pages.

=== Fire in the Hole ===
The follow-up titled Chickenhare: Fire in the Hole follows Chickenhare as he attempts to rescue his best friend Abe's soul from the depths of Hell.

== Films ==
In July 2011, it was announced that Sony Pictures Animation and Dark Horse Comics were adapting the Chickenhare series into an animated feature film. In October 2012, Grine wrote on the official Chickenhare Facebook page: "Read the screenplay last night. It's quite a bit different from the source material, but that doesn't mean it wasn't terrific! I honestly enjoyed it. Now let's hope it stays on course!" In June 2013, he wrote: "Finally got to read the 2nd draft of the Chickenhare screenplay. Man, if this thing makes it to the big screen, you guys in are in for a treat! It's SO full of adventure and laughs I almost can't believe it. Let's all cross our fingers." In January 2016, Grine wrote on his Twitter account that the film had been cancelled.

In February 2021, it was announced that the film was brought back in production, known as Chickenhare and the Hamster of Darkness, co-directed by Benjamin Mousquet and Ben Stassen, with Ben Stassen and Matthieu Zeller serving as producers, and Dave Collard writing the screenplay. It was co-produced by Sony Pictures International Productions and nWave Pictures, and was released on February 16, 2022.

The film was released by Netflix in the United States and other territories on June 10, 2022. It was followed by a sequel Chickenhare and the Secret of the Groundhog on October 10, 2025.
