= Young Love (TV series) =

American animated sitcom

- Created by: Matthew A. Cherry
- Based on: Hair Love by Matthew A. Cherry
- Showrunners: Matthew A. Cherry; Carl Jones
- Voices of: Scott Mescudi; Issa Rae; Loretta Devine; Harry Lennix; Tamar Braxton; Brooke Monroe Conaway
- Theme music composer: Taylor Graves
- Opening theme: "Young Love Theme"
- Composers: Amanda Jones; Taylor Graves
- Country of origin: United States
- Original language: English
- No. of seasons: 1
- No. of episodes: 12

Production
- Executive producers: David Stewart II; Carl Reed; Carl Jones; Karen Rupert Toliver; Monica A. Young; Matthew A. Cherry
- Producer: Karen Malach
- Editor: Jeff Newman
- Running time: 20–26 minutes
- Production companies: Sony Pictures Animation; Lion Forge Animation; Carl Jones Studios; Cherry Lane Productions

Original release
- Network: Max
- Release: September 21 – October 19, 2023

Young Love is an American animated sitcom created by Matthew A. Cherry, based on the 2019 short film Hair Love. It premiered on Max on September 21, 2023, and ended on October 19, 2023, with 12 episodes.

== Plot ==
Taken after the events of Hair Love, parents Angela Young and Stephen Love and their daughter Zuri live in the West Side of Chicago. Angela works as a hair stylist at a salon. Stephen works as an electronic musician who collaborates with famous artists. Zuri Young Love is a funny and happy-go-lucky kid who loves her parents, her grandparents, Gigi & Russell Young, and especially her cat, Rocky.

== Voice cast ==
- Scott Mescudi as Stephen Love, the father of Zuri, and the boyfriend of Angela. He works as an electronic musician and DJ.
- Issa Rae as Angela Young, the mother of Zuri, and the girlfriend of Stephen. She had cancer where she lost her own hair due to chemotherapy. 2 months later, she's now declared cancer-free and returned to working as a hairstylist at Lavish Life Salon.
- Loretta Devine as Gigi Young, Angela's mother, Stephen's mother-in-law, and Zuri's maternal grandmother. She is affectionate about everyone, especially with her daughter, Angela.
- Harry Lennix as Russell Young, Angela's father, Stephen's father-in-law, and Zuri's maternal grandfather. He claims that Stephen has squatted inside his house.
- Tamar Braxton as Star.
- Brooke Monroe Conaway as Zuri Micaela Young Love, Angela and Stephen's daughter, and Gigi and Russell's granddaughter. She is silly and affectionate, although she can be really mean at times. Her middle name, "Micaela" was revealed in the episode, Faith Love.

== Episodes ==
Mark A. Davis serves as supervising director.

No. in season	Title	Written by	Original release date
1	"Self Love"	Matthew A. Cherry; Carl Jones; Dayna Lynne North; Ranada Shepard	September 21, 2023
Taken 2 months after the events of Hair Love, a cancer-free Angela goes back to work, Zuri goes back to school and Stephen goes to a mansion to meet Lil Ankh and tries to impress him as possible. Unfortunately, due to her parents' jobs, Zuri has to attend a school fundraiser alone.
2	"Just Love"	Jeanine Daniels	September 21, 2023
While Angela tries to tackle her full list of goals, Stephen struggles to focus on an upcoming deadline.
3	"Work Love"	Keisha Zollar	September 21, 2023
While Angela's business gets more popularity, Lil Ankh takes Stephen for a ride, and Zuri is caught between her grandparents in the battle of the sexes.
4	"Charity Love"	Juston Gordon-Montgomery	September 28, 2023
Zuri invites her friend, Stacy over to her house, but finds out she's homeless and lives in a van. Meanwhile, Stephen tries to bond with his nephew, Amir
5	"Jingle Love"	Carl Jones	September 28, 2023
After Lil Ankh disrespects Stephen's beats, he starts working for a questionable marketing firm. Meanwhile, Angela fakes being rich to impress a new client.
6	"Lost Love"	Brian Ashburn	October 5, 2023
Due to an uncertain future he might have, Stephen might have to quit music. Meanwhile, Angela tries to find her true passion and Zuri attempts a career as an oracle.
7	"Game Love"	R. Malcolm Jones & Keisha Zollar	October 5, 2023
Stephen gets addicted to a video game. Meanwhile, Angela and Gigi join forces to fight back against a shady pyramid scheme
8	"Chicago Love"	Brian Ashburn	October 12, 2023
Amir embarks on an adventure with Zuri across Chicago while Stephen & Angela try to make the most of a rare free day.
9	"Protest Love"	Jackson DeLoach & Brian Ashburn	October 12, 2023
After her boss is out of town, Angela decides to run the salon. Meanwhile, Zuri becomes a playground activist.
10	"Generational Love"	Kelsey Barry & Breannah Gibson	October 19, 2023
When Zuri hangs out with her friends during a field trip to an amusement park, Angela feels a disconnection between her & Zuri. Meanwhile, Stephen pressures his nephew, Amir to become a sneakerhead.
11	"Faith Love"	Story by : Ranada Shepard & Brian Ashburn; Written by : Ranada Shepard, Brian Asburn, Guillermo Martinez	October 19, 2023
Zuri casts a heavenly spell on her classmates after a trip to church. Meanwhile, Angela and Stephen consult a financial advisor to help them with their bills.
12	"Love Love"	Keisha Zollar & Breannah Gibson	October 19, 2023
After Zuri tries to propose to her friend, BJ at lunch, Stephen and Angela consider marriage. However, creeping doubts lead the couple to question about their nuptials.

== Production ==
On July 7, 2020, HBO Max ordered a 12-episode animated series titled Young Love, based on the 2019 short film Hair Love. Matthew A. Cherry, who directed the film, and Carl Jones would serve as showrunners, and the series would be produced by Sony Pictures Animation, Blue Key Entertainment and Lion Forge Animation. Issa Rae reprises her role as the mother, now officially named Angela, while Scott Mescudi voices Stephen.

== Release ==
The series premiered on September 21, 2023. The first episode, "Self Love" was also released on YouTube and Video on Demand.

== Reception ==
The review aggregator website Rotten Tomatoes reported a 100% approval rating based on 17 critic reviews, with an average rating of 8.4/10. The website's critics consensus reads, "'Vibrantly animated and brimming with authentic observations about family, Young Love is exemplary wholesome entertainment." Metacritic assigned a score of 80 out of 100 based on 6 critics, indicating "generally favorable reviews".
