= Karen Rupert Toliver =

American film producer

Karen Rupert Toliver is an American film producer. Toliver has worked as an executive at Walt Disney Animation Studios, 20th Century Fox Animation, and Sony Pictures Animation, and has supervised the production of films such as Ferdinand, Curious George and Meet the Robinsons. She is the executive vice president of creative development at Sony Pictures Animation. Toliver is best known for co-producing the short film Hair Love, for which she received the Academy Award for Best Animated Short Film in 2020.

== Career ==
Toliver began her career as an assistant at Walt Disney Pictures, where she worked on The Mighty Ducks film series. She was later hired as a production executive at Walt Disney Animation Studios and worked on movies such as Chicken Little and Meet the Robinsons. After developing Curious George for Universal Pictures, Toliver then joined 20th Century Fox Animation and did production and development work for the Rio and Ice Age franchises, as well as Ferdinand, all of which were produced by Fox's Blue Sky Studios division.

After ten years at Fox, in 2017 Toliver moved to Sony Pictures Animation as a senior vice president of creative development. Two years later she was promoted to executive vice president of creative, where she recruits talent and creative material. Shortly before she changed jobs, she was approached by Matthew A. Cherry for production help with Hair Love.

After her promotion, Toliver assisted Cherry as a side project, and arranged for the film to be shown in theaters ahead of The Angry Birds Movie 2. In an interview with WBEZ she stated, "I've been in animation for many years and have never been able to work on something so personal to me and about the black family that ... hasn't really been represented in animation." Toliver stated that her own mother had lupus during Toliver's high school years and lost her hair as a result of the illness. Toliver received a 2020 Oscar for Best Animated Short Film for Hair Love, shared with Matthew A. Cherry, becoming the first African-American woman to win in that category.

== Accolades ==
- 2020 - Academy Award for Best Animated Short Film - Hair Love
