= Eyal Podell =

Israeli-American actor and screenwriter

- אייל פודל
- Born: Tel Aviv, Israel
- Occupations: Actor, screenwriter
- Years active: 1998–present
- Spouse: Ashley Podell
- Children: Oren Lily Podell

Eyal Podell (/eɪˈjɑːl poʊˈdɛl/; Hebrew: אייל פודל) is an Israeli-American actor and screenwriter. He is best known for his portrayals of Professor Adrian Korbel in the soap opera The Young and the Restless, Evram Mintz in Defying Gravity, and Namir Eschel in NCIS.

With partner Jonathon E. Stewart, he wrote the screenplay or story for the films Cars 3 (2017), The Angry Birds Movie 2 (2019), and Scoob! (2020).

== Early life ==
Podell was born in Tel Aviv, Israel, to a family of Jewish background. After spending the first two years of his childhood in Israel, Eyal and his family relocated to the United States for a year and then moved to Hong Kong, where he lived until the age of eight. Upon his return to the United States, his family settled in New York's Westchester County. He attended Byram Hills High School in Armonk with fellow actors Sean Maher and David Harbour. He is a graduate of Dartmouth College in Hanover, New Hampshire.

== Career ==
Since arriving in Los Angeles, Podell has worked consistently in both film and television. His big-screen debut came playing Al Pacino's son in The Insider. He was trained as a classical actor at the National Theater Institute, part of the Eugene O'Neill Theater Center. Most recently, Podell has appeared on NCIS: New Orleans as Samuel Wilkins. In addition to acting, he is also a writer.

== Personal life ==
He is the grandson of the late Odif and Judy Podell, co-founders of the modern architectural community, Usonia Homes in Pleasantville, New York. He is working on adapting the story of Usonia to film.

== Filmography ==
| Year | Title | Role | Notes |
|---|---|---|---|
| 1998 | Players | Barry Decker | Episode: "Con-undrum" |
| 1999 | Deep Blue Sea | Boy #1 | |
| 1999 | MTV's Undressed | Joel | 6 episodes |
| 1999 | The Insider | Lowell's Son | |
| 2000 | Time of Your Life | Aaron | 2 episodes |
| 2000 | The Chaos Factor | Johnny Hall | |
| 2001 | Ally McBeal | Mr. Whoople | Episode: "Getaway" |
| 2001 | Behind Enemy Lines | Petty Officer Kennedy | |
| 2002 | The Division | Ricky | Episode: "Brave New World" |
| 2002 | Manual Labor | Charles | Short |
| 2002 | Con Express | Rudy | Video |
| 2002 | Unconditional Love | Officer Romilly | |
| 2002 | The West Wing | Michael Gordon | Episode: "Debate Camp" |
| 2002 | ER | Unnamed | Episode: "Walk Like a Man" |
| 2002 | JAG | Petty Officer Holt | Episode: "The Killer" |
| 2003 | Without A Trace | Stanton | Episode: "There Goes the Bride" (Uncredited) |
| 2003 | Charmed | Roland | 2 episodes |
| 2003 | Miss Match | Glenn Cooper | Episode: "Something Nervy" |
| 2003–05 | Everwood | Justin | 2 episodes |
| 2004 | Blowing Smoke | Bob | TV movie |
| 2004 | Angel | Samuel Lawson | Episode: "Why We Fight" |
| 2004 | Sucker Free City | Stephan Cashen | TV movie |
| 2004 | CSI: Crime Scene Investigation | Kevin Stern | Episode: "Crow's Feet" |
| 2005 | Tides of War | Petty Officer Murray | TV movie |
| 2005 | Eyes | Jack Armstrong | Episode: "Wings" |
| 2005 | Pizza My Heart | Joe Montebello | TV movie |
| 2005–06 | Commander in Chief | Eli Meltzer | 6 episodes |
| 2006 | Behind Enemy Lines II: Axis of Evil | Ensign David Barnes | Video |
| 2006 | Mystery Woman: At First Sight | Ben Stafford | TV movie |
| 2006 | E-Ring | Wilson | Episode: "Hard Cell" |
| 2006 | Hard Scrambled | Scotty | |
| 2006 | Crossing Jordan | Jason Hartzman | Episode: "Death Toll" |
| 2006 | Lost | Young Man | Episode: "Live Together, Die Alone" (Uncredited) |
| 2006 | NCIS | Namir Eschel | Episode: "Shalom" |
| 2006–08 | The Young and the Restless | Adrian Korbel | Role held: September 18, 2006 – August 5, 2008 |
| 2008 | House | Yonatan | Episode: "Don't Ever Change" |
| 2008–09 | The Game | Joe | 3 episodes |
| 2009 | CSI: NY | Colin Clark | Episode: "Help" |
| 2009 | Defying Gravity | Evram Mintz | 13 episodes |
| 2009 | 24 | Ryan Burnett | 4 episodes |
| 2010 | The Event | Dr. Taylor | Episode: "For the Good of Our Country" |
| 2010 | The Forgotten | Perry Hughes | Episode: "Designer Jane" |
| 2011 | Harry's Law | Carl Thomas | Episode: "Send in the Clowns" |
| 2011 | Bones | Burt Iverson | Episode: "The Pinnochio in the Planter" |
| 2011 | Private Practice | Zach | Episode: "Remember Me" |
| 2011 | Valediction | Adam Thomas | Short |
| 2012 | Touch | Professor Logan Coteweiler | Episode: "Noosphere Rising" |
| 2012 | Lake Effects | Tyler | TV movie |
| 2012 | NCIS: Los Angeles | The Passenger | Episode: "Sans Voir, Part II" |
| 2012 | Liz & Dick | Henry Wynberg | TV movie |
| 2013 | Monday Mornings | Mark Widgeway | 3 episodes |
| 2013 | The Mentalist | Ian Percy | Episode: "Red Letter Day" |
| 2014 | Criminal Minds | Charlie Hosswell | Episode: "A Thousand Suns" |
| 2014–present | NCIS: New Orleans | Samuel Wilkins | 2 Episodes |
| 2017 | Cars 3 | | Story |
| 2019 | The Angry Birds Movie 2 | | Screenplay |
| 2020 | Scoob! | | Story |
| TBA | Seuss | | Story |
