= Peter Ackerman (playwright) =

American dramatist

- Occupations: Playwright, actor, screenwriter, television writer, television producer, author
- Years active: 2000–present
- Notable work: Ice Age; Ice Age: Dawn of the Dinosaurs; The Angry Birds Movie 2

Peter Ackerman is an American actor, playwright, screenwriter, television writer, television producer, and author.

== Career ==
Peter Ackerman began his varied career as an actor in the low budget movie Astronomy of Errors (2000). He later went on to perform in the Off-Broadway in The Complete Works of William Shakespeare (abridged) and in Visiting Mr. Green.

For the stage, Ackerman's debut play, Things You Shouldn't Say Past Midnight, was performed Off-Broadway in New York and at Soho Repertory Theatre in London. The play became an audio presentation for L.A. Theatre Works and appeared on member National Public Radio stations in North America. He also adapted it for DirecTV as a television series. He was commissioned by NPR to write another radio play, I’d Rather Eat Pants, which was broadcast as a short serial. He also authored the play The Urn and his revision of the musical The Pajama Game won the Tony Award for Best Revival of a Musical.

As a writer he was hired by 20th Century Fox to work on the animated film Ice Age where he became one of several screenwriters on the project. In 2002, Ice Age was a box office success and received an Academy Award nomination. Later he co-wrote the third Ice Age movie, Dawn of the Dinosaurs, which was released in 2009. Following the Ice Age movies, Ackerman was a writer and producer on the television series The Americans on FX and a writer and co-executive producer on Amazing Stories on Apple TV+. In May 2017, he was announced to write the screenplay of The Angry Birds Movie 2 for Sony Pictures. He has also written the children's books The Lonely Typewriter and The Lonely Phone Booth, which was produced as a musical at the Manhattan Children's Theatre.

In 2026, he received a nomination for Outstanding Writing for a Drama Series with Debora Cahn for their work on "Amagansett" episode of The Diplomat in 78th Primetime Emmy Awards.
