= Hair Love =

- Poster
- Directed by: Matthew A. Cherry; Everett Downing Jr.; Bruce W. Smith
- Written by: Matthew A. Cherry
- Produced by: Karen Rupert Toliver; Stacey Newton; Monica A. Young; Matthew A. Cherry; David Steward II; Carl Reed
- Starring: Issa Rae
- Edited by: Nick Mantz; Q. Bryce Randle; Illya Owens
- Music by: Paul Mounsey; Daniel D. Crawford; Taylor Graves
- Production companies: Sony Pictures Animation; Matthew A. Cherry Entertainment; Lion Forge Animation; 6 Point Harness
- Distributed by: Sony Pictures Releasing
- Release date: August 14, 2019 (with The Angry Birds Movie 2)
- Running time: 6 minutes
- Country: United States
- Language: English

Hair Love is a 2019 American independent animated short film directed by Matthew A. Cherry, Everett Downing Jr., and Bruce W. Smith, and written by Cherry. It follows the story of a man who must do his daughter's hair for the first time, and features Issa Rae as the voice of the mother. The film was produced after a 2017 Kickstarter campaign, and was also released as a children's book in May 2019 with illustrations by Vashti Harrison. Hair Love received generally positive reviews and won Best Animated Short Film at the 92nd Academy Awards. A spin-off TV series titled Young Love was ordered by Max in July 2020 and premiered on September 21, 2023.

== Synopsis ==
7-year-old Zuri unsuccessfully attempts to style her hair using a hair tutorial video made by her mother, Angela. Her father, Stephen, tries to style her hair himself, imagining the hair as his opponent in a boxing match. He fails, upsetting Zuri. Zuri and Stephen then watch the video together and pull off the style. They enter a hospital room where her mother is wearing a scarf and sitting in a wheelchair. She removes her scarf to reveal that her head is completely bald, the result of chemotherapy for cancer. The family members hug each other and return home together. The credits show the family spending time together as Angela's hair begins to grow out again.

== Cast ==
- Issa Rae as Zuri's mother, an online hair vlogger
- Matthew Cherry as Stephen, Zuri's father

== Production ==
Cherry stated that he was inspired to create Hair Love to counter stereotypes about Black fathers, because "Black fathers have had one of the worst raps in mainstream media as being portrayed as being deadbeats and not being involved.” He and Karen Rupert Toliver also stated that they wanted to increase representation of Black hair.

In 2017, Cherry created a Kickstarter campaign for a short animated film called Hair Love. The film is about an African American dad who is attempting to style his young daughter Zuri's hair for the first time. The campaign surpassed its initial goal of $75,000 and raised over $300,000. According to Kickstarter, that exceeds the amount raised by any other short film project on the platform. He co-directed the film with Everett Downing and Bruce W. Smith, with Peter Ramsey and Pixar animator Frank Abney serving as executive producers. The film was co-produced with Karen Rupert Toliver, whom Cherry approached for help.

On March 20, 2019, Sony Pictures Animation announced that they had picked up Hair Love, which was slated to be released theatrically later that year. Hair Love was storyboarded in Toon Boom Storyboard Pro and animated in Toon Boom Harmony by Mondo Media under their 6 Point Harness label.

== Release ==
Hair Love was first shown in theaters alongside The Angry Birds Movie 2 on August 14, 2019, and was uploaded to YouTube four months later on December 5. The short was eventually attached to later prints of Jumanji: The Next Level beginning on January 24, 2020, and by the following month was also attached to screenings of Little Women. The film was also adapted into a children's book, written by Cherry and illustrated by artist Vashti Harrison, which was released by Dial Books on May 14, 2019. The book was on the New York Times Book Review Children's Best Sellers list.

== TV series ==
On July 7, 2020, the streaming service Max ordered a 12-episode animated series titled Young Love with Cherry and Carl Jones serving as showrunners, to be produced by Sony Pictures Animation, Blue Key Entertainment and Lion Forge Animation. Issa Rae reprises her role as the mother, while Kid Cudi voices Stephen. The series premiered on September 21, 2023.

== Accolades ==
Award	Date of ceremony	Category	Recipient(s)	Result	Ref.
Academy Awards	February 9, 2020	Best Animated Short Film	Matthew A. Cherry & Karen Rupert Toliver	Won	
Black Reel Awards	February 6, 2020	Outstanding Independent Short Film	Matthew A. Cherry	Won	
Funky Panda Awards	October 9, 2024	Best Short Film	Hair Love	Nominated	
