= Chickenhare and the Hamster of Darkness =

2022 animated film by nWave Pictures

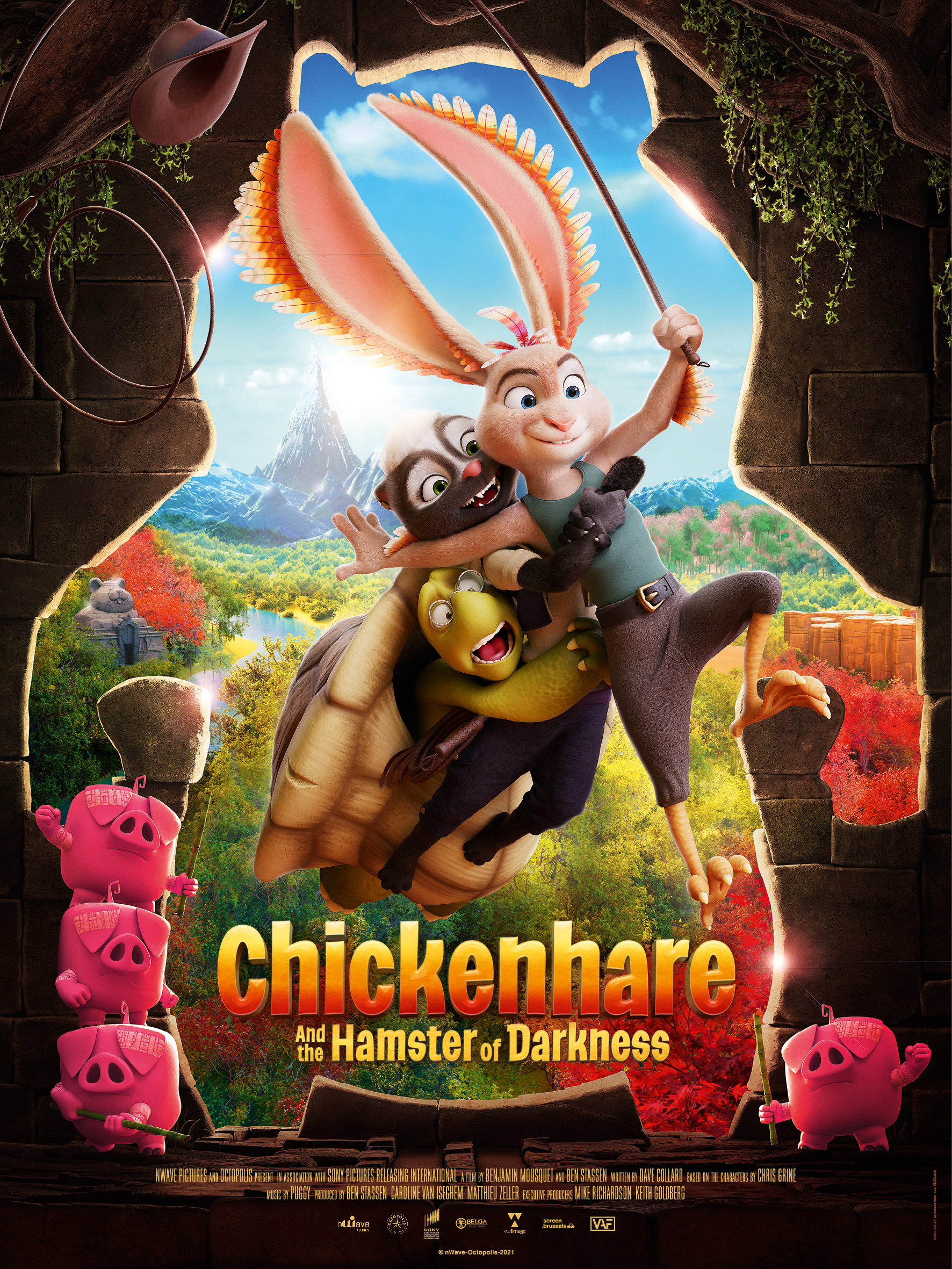
- Theatrical release poster
- Directed by: Benjamin Mousquet; Ben Stassen
- Written by: Dave Collard
- Based on: Chickenhare by: Chris Grine
- Produced by: Ben Stassen; Caroline Van Iseghem; Matthieu Zeller
- Starring: Jordan Tartakow; Joe Ochman; Laila Berzins; Odessa Lurlean
- Cinematography: Ben Stassen; Benjamin Mousquet
- Music by: Puggy
- Production companies: nWave Pictures; Octopolis; Dark Horse Entertainment
- Distributed by: Belga Films (Belgium); Sony Pictures Releasing (France) (Note: Distributed under the Sony Pictures International Productions label.); Netflix (International)
- Release dates: January 23, 2022 (Gaumont Champs-Élysées); February 16, 2022 (Belgium); June 10, 2022 (Netflix)
- Running time: 91 minutes
- Countries: Belgium; France
- Language: English
- Budget: €20 million
- Box office: $10.8 million

Chickenhare and the Hamster of Darkness is a 2022 animated adventure comedy film produced by nWave Pictures, written by David Collard and directed by Benjamin Mousquet (in his directorial debut) and Ben Stassen; it is based on the graphic novel Chickenhare by Chris Grine. The film follows the adventures and coming-of-age journey of Chickenhare, a one-of-a-kind hero born half chicken and half hare, who is eager to fit in and become an adventurer despite his differences. It is one of Brad Venable's final film roles. A sequel, Chickenhare and the Secret of the Groundhog, was released on October 15, 2025.

== Plot ==
Hare brothers Peter and Lapin visit a jungle temple in search of the mystical Hamster of Darkness, but are unsuccessful in their quest. Outside the temple, they discover a chicken-hare hybrid baby whom Peter adopts and names Chickenhare. As he grows up, Chickenhare becomes enamored with plans to follow his father's footsteps as an adventurer, but also struggles with self confidence, as he is ostracized by his peers for being different.

Twenty years later, Chickenhare attempts to pass the Royal Adventure Society trials to become an adventurer, but the disguise he uses to cover his chicken features weighs him down, causing him to fail the test. Undeterred, he decides to search for the Hamster of Darkness to prove himself as an adventurer and visits Lapin, who has been imprisoned after attempting to overthrow Peter as King of Featherbeard but has information on the artifact. Lapin escapes using one of Chickenhare's feathers and sets off with a crew of prisoners to find the artifact as well. Determined to stop Lapin, Chickenhare, joined by his tortoise servant Abe, follow him.

The duo arrive at a desert city to find a guide to get through the Desert of Death but are intercepted by two of Lapin's goons. The pair are rescued by skunk explorer Meg, who agrees to guide them through the desert. The group is later captured in a bamboo forest by Pigmies, tribal pig-like creatures who mistake Chickenhare for a god, and the leader commands them to prepare a feast. The pigmies cage Meg, Chickenhare and Abe. While caged, Chickenhare blames his appearance on his misfortune, but Meg snaps him out of it by telling him how she embraced her skunk nature in the past and encourages Chickenhare to do the same. The three friends escape from the Pigmies and they continue their journey.

At the Frosty Mountains, Chickenhare, Meg, and Abe enter the temple and complete three trials to get to the Hamster of Darkness, ultimately discovering an ice scepter in the tomb of the long-extinct hamsters. Lapin and his crew arrive and take the scepter, summoning the hamsters' ghosts to take over Featherbeard and leaving the trio stranded in the temple. Meg reminds Chickenhare how his unusual features led them to the temple, and he uses his unexpected flight abilities to save Meg and Abe and catch up to Lapin.

Back in Featherbeard, Lapin has taken over the kingdom with the help of the ghost hamsters. Aided by Abe and Meg, Chickenhare gets the scepter back from Lapin, but the scepter's power only responds to the one who first uses it. Chickenhare decides to destroy it and runs to the Royal Adventure Society testing grounds, hoping to drop the scepter into the massive pit beneath the arena. After a battle, Chickenhare and Lapin fight for the scepter and both fall into the pit. Chickenhare saves himself by flying away, while Lapin falls to his apparent demise. With the scepter destroyed, the ghost hamsters disappear, and Lapin's henchmen are arrested.

After some time, Chickenhare decides to become an independent adventurer with Meg and Abe, and Peter gives him his treasured golden machete as a sign of support.

== Voice cast ==
- Jordan Tartakow as Chickenhare, a half-hare and half-chicken who aspires to be an adventurer
- Joey Lotsko as Abe, a sarcastic Galápagos tortoise who is Chickenhare's servant and best friend
- Laila Berzins as Meg, a streetwise martial artist striped skunk and expert adventurer who offers to guide Chickenhare and Abe on their quest
- Brad Venable and Chris McCune as Peter, Lapin's brother and Chickenhare's adoptive hare father who is both the ruler of the kingdom of Featherbeard and an idolized explorer
- Danny Fehsenfeld as Lapin, Peter's brother and Chickenhare's adoptive uncle, a greedy and manipulative hare who dreams of ruling over Featherbeard
- Joseph Camen as Luther, a paternal mountain gorilla and Lapin's long-time henchman
- Dino Andrade as Barry, a Mandarin duck who is Lapin's sidekick
- Cedric Williams and Marcus Griffin as Lance and Whitey, a chicken and a hare respectively who are the cool kids of Featherbeard and bully Chickenhare for his appearance

== Production ==
=== Development ===
In July 2011, it was announced that Sony Pictures Animation and Dark Horse Entertainment were adapting the Chickenhare series into an animated feature film. In October 2012, Grine wrote on the official Chickenhare Facebook page: "Read the screenplay last night. It's quite a bit different from the source material, but that doesn't mean it wasn't terrific! I honestly enjoyed it. Now let's hope it stays on course!" In June 2013, he wrote: "Finally got to read the 2nd draft of the Chickenhare screenplay. Man, if this thing makes it to the big screen, you guys in are in for a treat! It's SO full of adventure and laughs I almost can't believe it. Let's all cross our fingers." In January 2016, Grine wrote on his Twitter account that the film had been cancelled.

In early 2021, nWave Pictures president and CEO Matthieu Zeller announced through Variety that Sony Pictures International Productions was partnering with film director Ben Stassen on nWave's new animated feature film. Chickenhare and the Hamster of Darkness is based on the graphic novels created by Chris Grine and published by Dark Horse comics. Its screenplay, on the other hand is the work of Dave Collard with rewritings by Stassen and Benjamin Mousquet.

The production of Chickenhare started in late 2019 and was completed in early January 2022. It took three years of work with over 200 people involved in the production of the film. Benjamin Mousquet, who made his directorial debut with Stassen after working at the studio as an animator for many years, was immediately drawn to the film's themes of inclusion and friendship. Both directors enjoyed including references to franchises like Indiana Jones.

=== Music ===
The pop-rock trio Puggy composed the score for the film, continuing their collaboration with nWave Pictures after The Son of Bigfoot and Bigfoot Family. For this film, the band broke away from its signature pop sound and explored a whole new style with the help of a classical musician, Pavel Guerchovitch.

== Release ==
Chickenhare and the Hamster of Darkness world premiere took on January 23 at the Gaumont Champs-Élysées theater in Paris, later the film opened on February 16 in France, Belgium, the Netherlands, and Luxembourg. It garnered 170.697 admissions on its first weekend in France and grossed a box office of €191 083 on its opening weekend in Belgium.

The film was released by Netflix in the United States and other territories on June 10, 2022.

== Legacy ==
=== Video game ===
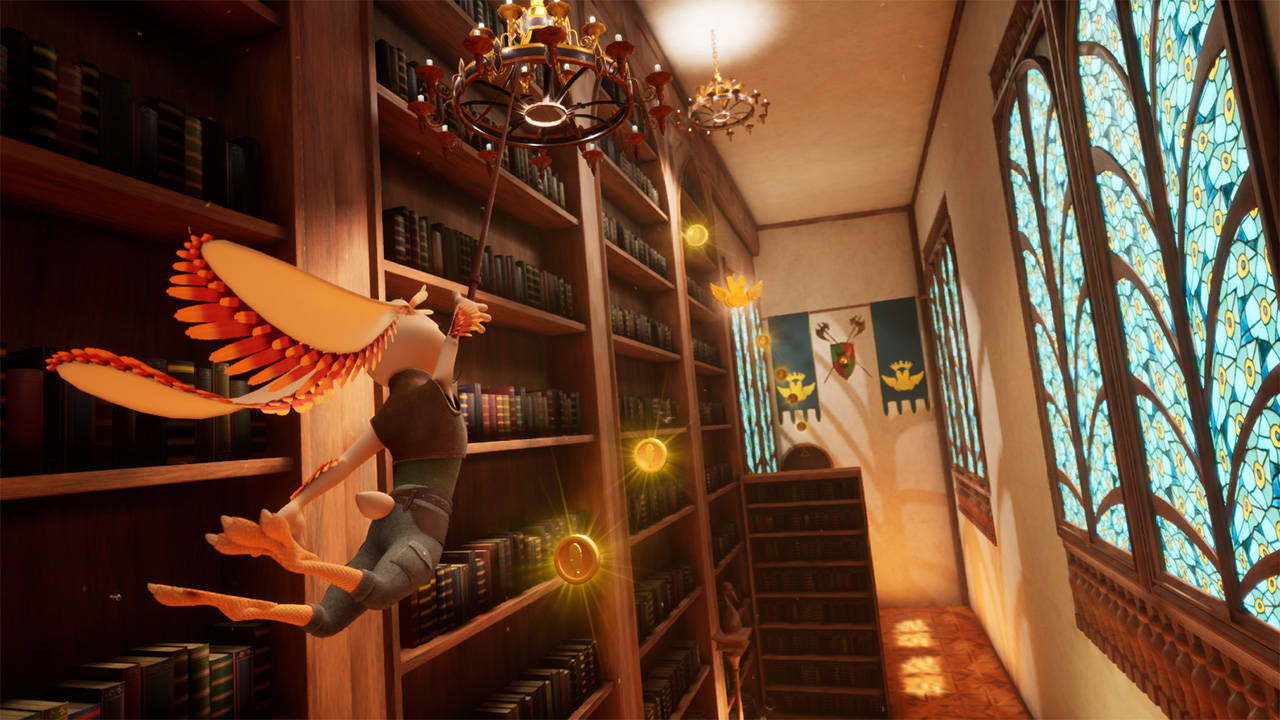
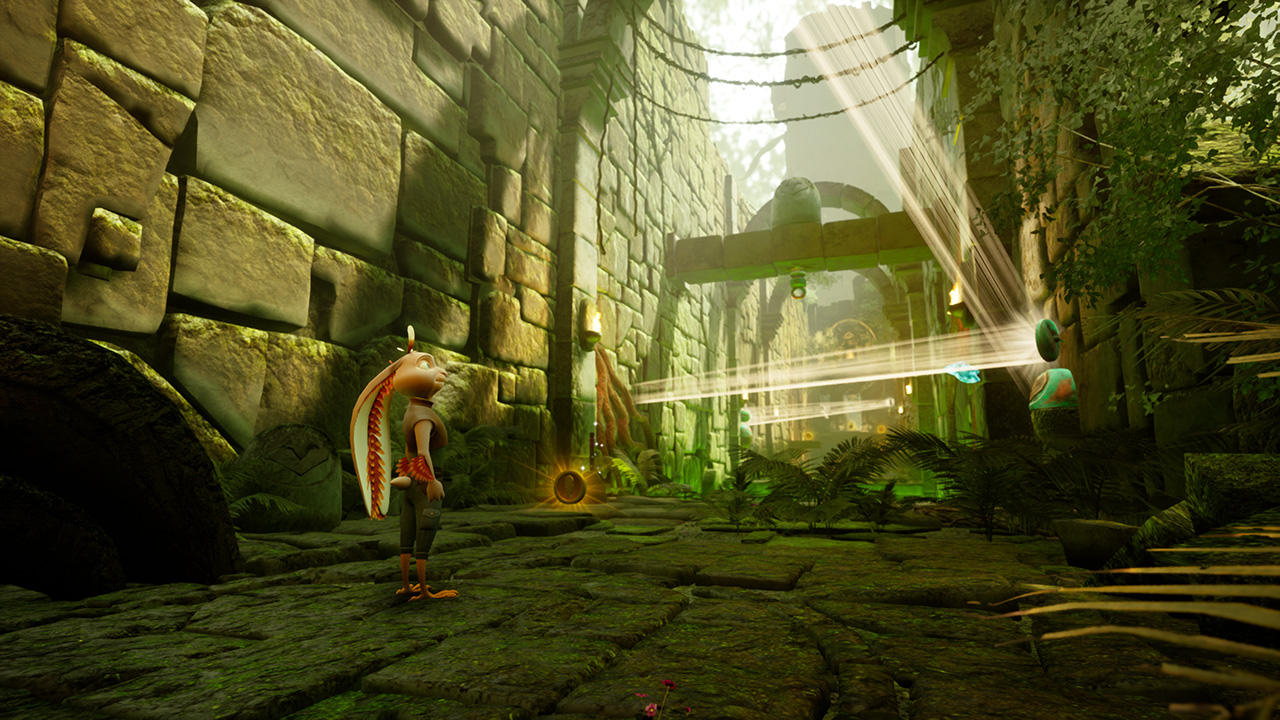
Screenshots of Chickenhare and the Treasure of Spiking Beard

A separate video game adaptation tie-in, titled Chickenhare and the Treasure of Spiking Beard, was released in October 2025 on Windows, Nintendo Switch, PlayStation 4, PlayStation 5 and Xbox Series X/S.

=== Sequel ===
During an interview on The Inseparables, Zeller revealed that Chickenhare and the Secret of the Groundhog, as a sequel to Chickenhare and The Hamster of Darkness is in production. It was released in French theaters on October 15, 2025.
