= Chickenhare and the Secret of the Groundhog =

2025 sequel film

- Theatrical release poster
- Directed by: Benjamin Mousquet
- Screenplay by: Dave Collard; Chris Grine
- Based on: Chickenhare by: Chris Grine
- Produced by: Matthieu Gondinet; Matthieu Zeller
- Starring: Jordan Tartakow; Joe Ochman; Laila Berzins; Odessa Lurlean
- Music by: Puggy
- Production companies: nWave Studios; Octopolis; Dark Horse Entertainment; Sony Pictures
- Distributed by: SND (France); Angel Studios (United States)
- Release dates: 12 June 2025 (Annecy); 15 October 2025 (France); 3 September 2026 (United States)
- Running time: 89 minutes
- Countries: France; Belgium; United States
- Languages: French; English
- Budget: $23 million
- Box office: $9.7 million

Chickenhare and the Secret of the Groundhog (French: Hopper et le secret de la marmotte) is a 2025 animated adventure film produced by nWave Studios, directed by Benjamin Mousquet, and written by Dave Collard and Chris Grine. It is the sequel to the Netflix 2022 film, Chickenhare and the Hamster of Darkness and the second installment of Chickenhare film series. It is based on the graphic novel Chickenhare by Chris Grine. Chickenhare and the Secret of the Groundhog premiered at the Annecy International Animated Film Festival on June 12, 2025, and was released in France on October 15 by SND. The film was released on Angel Studios' streaming platform in the United States on September 3, 2026.

== Plot ==
Chickenhare, along with his friends Abe and Meg, returns from their latest quest from the palace of King Zamban to find the Holy Spork, a relic designed to allow the user to eat anything. However, Chickenhare’s adoptive father, King Peter, recognizes a marking on the Spork. He secretly brings the trio to the library to discuss the Groundhog with the Backwards-Facing Face, a creature rumored to travel through time and alter one past event. Peter uses the Spork on a seemingly blank parchment, revealing a map of the Isle of Idle Hands. Chickenhare, Meg, Abe, and Peter plan an expedition, unaware that twin chameleons, Miggie and Rolf, and a chicken archivist named Gina, overheard.

Gina speaks to Chickenhare in private, telling him she’s his long-lost sister and that their birth people are on the verge of extinction because their island’s Tree of Life is dying. Gina wants to use the Groundhog to save the tree, but Peter wants the Groundhog destroyed. Wanting to save his people, Chickenhare steals the map from Peter, and he, Meg, Abe, and Gina take a boat to the Isle of Idle Hands themselves. Meanwhile, Crolloq, a lynx adventurer and Meg’s bitter former partner, learns of the Groundhog from the chameleons, and plans to find it herself so she can have Meg back to herself.

Arriving in Hilly-City, the group hires Carl, a former cartographer turned tattoo artist, who finds two intentional errors on the map signifying the treasure locations. When Carl requests to give Chickenhare a tattoo as payment, the group runs away, only to bump into Crolloq and a group of pigmies, who chase the quartet through the city until the pigmies get distracted, leaving the littlest one, Squeak, behind. The group escapes on gondolas, but Gina suggests they split up to cover more ground. Crolloq follows Meg and Abe in her airship, so Meg leaps off the gondola to lure Crolloq away from Abe.

Abe wanders the jungle when he meets Squeak, and the two bond. They soon find their half of the treasure: a magic shovel to focus the Groundhog's power. Meanwhile, Meg knocks out Miggie and Rolf but is overpowered by Crolloq, and they both fall into a pit, causing the lynx to have a panic attack. Meg calms Crolloq down, and the two reminisce, with Meg admitting she still cares. Miggie and Rolf regain consciousness and help them out of the pit.

Chickenhare soon discovers that Gina is a harechicken just like himself, and learns that they used to be normal hares until the rat King Bartolomeo cursed their ancestors for disobeying him to fight in a war. Reaching the Sundial Hills, the two explore a temple and find the Groundhog. However, after escaping the collapsing ruins, Gina betrays Chickenhare, revealing she actually wants the Groundhog to change them back into normal hares; angered, Chickenhare disowns Gina before she knocks him out with a blow gun, overpowers Abe and Squeak, steals the shovel, and sails away.

Chickenhare regains consciousness and is found by Peter and Meg. With the group back together, a humbled Crolloq offers a ride on her airship to go after Gina. Gina returns to the harechicken village, hidden by the withering tree through a system of pulleys, and the villagers, including her father, prepare for the ritual, but Gina begins having doubts.

As morning comes, Chickenhare and his friends arrive to stop the ritual. However, Chickenhare and Gina both grab the Groundhog as it powers up, sending them to their family tree, where glimpses of their family's past appear, including the death of Chickenhare and Gina’s mother. However, it is revealed that there was no curse; they were always harechickens, and Bartolomeo merely made them outcasts. Attempting to stop a paranoid ancestor from spreading the transformation lie, Gina enters the past and speaks through him, trying to embolden the harechickens to accept themselves. But her words accidentally spark a war, altering the timeline and setting up a catastrophic future that begins destroying the family tree as the Groundhog tries to escape and strand them there.

Using their ability to fly, Chickenhare and Gina use another portal to undo Gina’s choice. Humbled, Gina apologizes for everything she did; Chickenhare re-accepts her, and the Groundhog is freed from his imprisonment. Chickenhare and Gina return to the present, tell the harechickens the truth, and encourage them to give the outside world another chance. Inspired, the harechickens open the Tree of Life to the outside world again, allowing it to heal and bear fruit. Chickenhare returns home with his friends, with Gina promising she will visit him soon, and the villagers set out to explore the world on their own terms.

== Voice cast ==
- Jordan Tartakow as Chickenhare, a hybrid of hare and chicken.
- Joe Ochman as Abe, a sarcastic turtle.
- Laila Berzins as Meg, a martial artist striped skunk.
- Odessa Lurlean as Crolloq, a lynx and Meg's old partner.
- Dino Andrade and Todd Haberkorn as Miggie and Rolf, twin chameleon brothers and Crolloq's sidekicks.
- Wally Wingert as King Peter
- Xanthe Huynh as Gina, Chickenhare's long-lost sister.

== Production ==
=== Development ===
In December 2023, nWave, revealed that the studio had begun production on a sequel to Chickenhare and the Hamster of Darkness.

=== Writing ===
The new installment went through three different scripts before the filmmakers settled on the final plot.

== Release ==
Chickenhare and the Secret of the Groundhog premiered at the Annecy International Animated Film Festival on June 12, 2025. It was later released on Angel Studios' streaming platform in the United States on September 3, 2026.

== Reception ==
=== Box office ===
As of December 14, 2025, Chickenhare and the Secret of the Groundhog has surpassed 830,000 admissions in France and over 1 million admissions across Europe.
