= Matthew A. Cherry =

American film director, writer, producer, and American football player (born 1981)

- Born: December 14, 1981 (age 44)
- Occupations: Film director; writer; producer; American football player
- Years active: 2007–present (film career)
- Notable work: Hair Love
- Spouse: Candice Wilson (m. 2020)
- Football career

No. 2, 13, 14, 18
- Position: Wide receiver

Personal information
- Listed height: 6 ft 1 in (1.85 m)
- Listed weight: 203 lb (92 kg)

Career information
- College: Akron
- NFL draft: 2004: undrafted

Career history
- Jacksonville Jaguars (2004)*; Cincinnati Bengals (2004)*; Ottawa Renegades (2005)*; Carolina Panthers (2006)*; Hamburg Sea Devils (2006)*; Baltimore Ravens (2006)*
- * Offseason or practice squad member only

Awards and highlights
- Second-team All-Mid-American Conference honors (2003)

Matthew A. Cherry (born December 14, 1981) is an American film director, writer, producer, and former American football player. He wrote and directed two independent films, The Last Fall (2012), and 9 Rides (2016). He is best known for the 2019 Academy Award-winning animated short film, Hair Love. The Kickstarter campaign for Hair Love raised nearly $300,000 and broke the record for the highest amount raised for any short film on the platform.

== Early life ==
Cherry was raised in the Northwest Side of Chicago, Illinois, and graduated from Loyola Academy in nearby Wilmette in 1999. He attended the University of Akron, where he played on the football team and earned a bachelor's degree in media.

Cherry played college football for four seasons with the Akron Zips under head coach Lee Owens and was a second-team All-Mid-American Conference wide receiver. He finished his career as the all-time leading receiver in school history and ended his senior season with records for total receptions, yards, touchdowns, punt return yards and punt return touchdowns.

== Professional football career ==
Pre-draft measurables
Height	Weight	40-yard dash
6 ft 0 5/8 in (1.84 m)	202 lb (92 kg)	4.56 s
All values from Pro Day

Cherry signed with the Jacksonville Jaguars as an undrafted free agent following the 2004 NFL draft. He was waived during final roster cuts on August 29, 2004, and re-signed to the team's practice squad on September 6. The Cincinnati Bengals signed him off of the Jaguars' practice squad to their active roster on December 29, 2004, before the final game of the season.

Cherry was waived by the Bengals during final roster cuts on August 29, 2005. He worked out for the Ottawa Renegades of the Canadian Football League on September 9, 2005, but left the team by September 21 without having played in a game. The Renegades franchise folded shortly after due to financial instability.

Cherry signed with the Carolina Panthers in 2006, and was allocated to the Hamburg Sea Devils of NFL Europe. He was waived by Hamburg during final roster cuts on March 5, 2006. He returned to the Panthers, but was waived on May 30, 2006. He signed with the Baltimore Ravens on August 3, 2006. He was placed on injured reserve on August 30, 2006, and missed the entire season.

== Film career ==
=== Career beginnings ===
Cherry retired from football in 2007 to pursue a film career. After initially working as a production assistant he began directing music videos. He directed the video for gospel song "Say Yes" by singer Michelle Williams.

Cherry wrote and directed his first film, The Last Fall, in 2012. The film stars Lance Gross and Nicole Beharie. The film, which premiered at SXSW, received average critical reviews. Peter Deburge of Variety described The Last Fall as a "tepid daytime-TV melodrama." Gary Goldstein wrote in the Los Angeles Times, "this is an involving, sympathetic film unafraid to wear its sizable heart on its sleeve." It won Best Screenplay at the American Black Film Festival.

His second film, 9 Rides, was shot entirely on an iPhone 6s, which may be the first feature film shot using the device. Starring Dorian Missick, it premiered at SXSW in 2016. Tom Harrington of The Daily Dot called it "a taut, attractive piece of work." Shannon M. Houston reviewed the film for Paste and wrote, "9 Rides is proof that Cherry is a storyteller who can do quite a bit with a modest budget (this is the first film shot on an iPhone 6s) and a simple premise."

=== Hair Love ===
In 2017, Cherry created a Kickstarter campaign for a short animated film called Hair Love. The campaign surpassed its initial goal of $75,000 and raised nearly $300,000. He co-directed the film with Everett Downing and Bruce W. Smith, with Peter Ramsey and Pixar animator Frank Abney serving as executive producers. On March 20, 2019, Sony Pictures Animation announced that they had picked up Hair Love, which was released in theaters alongside The Angry Birds Movie 2 on August 14, 2019. The film won the 2020 Academy Award for Best Animated Short, with Cherry accepting the award alongside fellow producer Karen Rupert Toliver.

In 2020, Cherry became a member of the Academy of Motion Picture Arts and Sciences.

=== Television ===
In June 2020, Cherry signed a first-look deal with Warner Bros. Television.

On July 7, 2020, HBO Max, ordered a 12-episode season of Young Love, a 2D animated series from Cherry based on his short film Hair Love.

==== Upcoming projects ====
In June 2020, Cherry was revealed to be working on The Come Up, a heist comedy movie for New Line Cinema. In October 2020, Cherry was revealed to be working on a project for Sony Pictures Animation, titled Tut. In March 2021, Cherry was set to direct the pilot episode of The Kings of Napa for OWN. In January 2022, Cherry was set to direct Redd Zone, a football drama movie with Jada Pinkett Smith starring for Netflix.

== Filmography ==
=== Film ===
Year	Title	Director	Writer	Producer
2012	The Last Fall	Yes	Yes	Yes
2016	9 Rides	Yes	Yes	Yes
2019	Hair Love	Yes	Yes	Yes

Executive producer

- BlacKkKlansman (2018)

Production consultant

- Spider-Man: Across the Spider-Verse (2023)

=== Television ===
Director

Year	Title	Notes
2019	Whiskey Cavalier	Episode "Spain, Trains and Automobiles"
2019	The Red Line	Episode "We Need Glory for a While"
2019	Mixed-ish	Episode "Bad Boys"
2019–2020	The Unicorn	2 episodes
2020	Black-ish	3 episodes
2020–2021	Saved by the Bell	2 episodes
2021	The Wonder Years	Episode "Science Fair"
2022	Kenan	Episode "Ghosts of Boyfriends Past"
2022	The Kings of Napa	2 episodes
2022	Grand Crew	Episode "Wine & Headlines"
2022	Bel-Air	Episode "Can't Knock the Hustle"
2022	Abbott Elementary	Episode "Ava vs. Superintendent"
2023	Ghosts	2 episodes
2023-2024	Young Sheldon	2 episodes
2023	Swagger	2 episodes

Co-producer

- The Last O.G. (2019) (Episode "Sound of Da Police")
