= The Angry Birds Movie 2 =

2019 film by Thurop Van Orman

- Theatrical release poster
- Directed by: Thurop Van Orman
- Screenplay by: Peter Ackerman; Eyal Podell; Jonathon E. Stewart
- Based on: Angry Birds by Rovio Entertainment
- Produced by: John Cohen
- Starring: Jason Sudeikis; Josh Gad; Leslie Jones; Bill Hader; Rachel Bloom; Awkwafina; Sterling K. Brown; Eugenio Derbez; Danny McBride; Peter Dinklage
- Cinematography: Simon Dunsdon
- Edited by: Kent Beyda; Ally Garrett
- Music by: Heitor Pereira
- Production companies: Sony Pictures Animation; Rovio Entertainment
- Distributed by: Sony Pictures Releasing (Note: While Sony Pictures Animation is the film's copyright holder, the logo for Columbia Pictures appears in the film's promotional material, but not in the film's opening titles.)
- Release date: August 14, 2019 (United States)
- Running time: 97 minutes
- Countries: Finland; United States
- Language: English
- Budget: $65 million
- Box office: $152.8 million

The Angry Birds Movie 2 is a 2019 animated comedy film based on the Angry Birds video game series. It is the second installment in the film series and the sequel to The Angry Birds Movie (2016). Directed by Thurop Van Orman and written by Peter Ackerman, Eyal Podell and Jonathon E. Stewart, the film stars Jason Sudeikis, Josh Gad, Bill Hader, Danny McBride, and Peter Dinklage reprising their roles from the first film, with Leslie Jones, Rachel Bloom, Awkwafina, Sterling K. Brown, and Eugenio Derbez joining the cast. In the film, the birds are forced to team up with the pigs to stop Eagle Island's leader from destroying both of their islands.

The film was produced by Sony Pictures Animation and Rovio Entertainment. Heitor Pereira returned to compose the film's score, with artists such as Kesha and Luke Combs contributing tracks for the soundtrack. The film also features classical pop songs from the 1960s to 2000s, like its predecessor.

The Angry Birds Movie 2 was theatrically released in Finland on August 7, 2019, and in the United States on August 14, by Sony Pictures Releasing. It received generally positive reviews from critics, who deemed it to be an improvement over the first, and grossed $153 million on a $65 million budget. A sequel, The Angry Birds Movie 3, is set to be released on December 23, 2026, by Paramount Pictures.

== Plot ==
On Bird Island, Red has become a hero after saving the island's eggs, (Note: As depicted in The Angry Birds Movie (2016)) and defends the island from a prank war against the pigs of Piggy Island, led by Leonard. One day, a giant ice ball from the distant Eagle Island crashes near Piggy Island, prompting Leonard to call for a truce and propose an alliance with the birds. The new threat comes from Zeta, the leader of Eagle Island, who is tired of living on the island and plans to take over both islands by launching lava-filled balls of ice from her superweapon inside of a volcano. Meanwhile, Red struggles with insecurity, fearing he will no longer be admired if peace is achieved. His friends Chuck and Bomb invite him to a speed dating event, where Red meets Chuck's sister, Silver, an engineering student who deems him incompatible. At the same time, three hatchlings—Zoe, Vincent, and Samantha—accidentally lose Zoe's unhatched sisters and embark on a quest to retrieve them.

Leonard visits Red and convinces him to form a team and infiltrate Eagle Island. They recruit Chuck, Bomb, Silver, Leonard's assistant Courtney, and Mighty Eagle, the latter of whom recognizes Zeta. The group plans their mission in Mighty Eagle's cave but is interrupted when Zeta's weapon destroys part of Eagle Mountain, frightening the other birds. To reach Eagle Island, the team uses a submarine built by pig inventor Garry. Red insists that evacuation is unnecessary, hoping to preserve his heroic image.

Upon arrival, Mighty Eagle confesses that Zeta was once his fiancée, but he abandoned her out of cowardice. Upon arriving, Red decides to infiltrate the weapon alone, though Silver follows him. Red and Silver sneak into the cannon's entrance but are quickly captured by security. Zeta reveals her plan to bombard the islands with lava-filled ice balls to force evacuation. Regretting his decisions, Red admits to Silver that his actions were driven by his fear of losing popularity. Silver comforts him, and together they escape through Silver's ingenuity.

Elsewhere, Chuck, Bomb, and the three pigs disguise themselves as Harvey to infiltrate the base and obtain a keycard. They reunite with Red and Silver, the latter of whom devises a plan to destroy the cannon as it begins to charge. Red and Silver encase themselves in an ice ball and attempt to destroy the weapon from within, but their plan fails. As Zeta prepares to fire the cannon, Mighty Eagle confronts her and apologizes for abandoning her. Zeta dismisses Mighty Eagle, revealing that her assistant, Debbie, is actually their daughter. While Zeta is distracted, Chuck ties the weapon using Silver's latest invention, a type of string with enhanced durability, which slows the launched lava balls. When the string begins to break, the hatchlings and three piglets who helped them recover the eggs arrive and help hold the line. The lava balls are pulled back into the cannon, causing it to explode and destroy the base. Everyone escapes and Mighty Eagle saves Debbie from falling debris, redeeming himself to Zeta and Debbie.

Afterwards, Mighty Eagle and Zeta marry on Bird Island as the truce continues. Red credits the team—especially Silver—for saving the islands, earning more admiration from islanders. Red and Silver begin a relationship to Chuck's defensiveness. Meanwhile, the hatchlings discover they mistakenly rescued a boa constrictor's eggs instead of Zoe's sisters. The hatchlings and the snake exchange their babies before Zoe's sisters drift away out to sea again.

== Voice cast ==
- Jason Sudeikis as Red
- Rachel Bloom as Silver
- Leslie Jones as Zeta
- Josh Gad as Chuck
- Danny McBride as Bomb
  - Suzanne Waters as Bomb's opera voice
- Bill Hader as Leonard
- Awkwafina as Courtney
- Sterling K. Brown as Garry
- Eugenio Derbez as Glenn
- Peter Dinklage as Mighty Eagle, whose real name is Ethan
- Tiffany Haddish as Debbie
- Maya Rudolph as Matilda
- Tony Hale as Mime
- Anthony Padilla as Hal
- Brooklynn Prince as Zoe
- Genesis Tennon as Vincent
- Alma Varsano as Samantha
- JoJo Siwa as Jay
- Zach Woods as Carl
- Pete Davidson as Jerry
- Lil Rel Howery as Alex
- Dove Cameron as Ella
- Nicki Minaj as Pinky
- Beck Bennett as Hank
  - Bennett also voiced Brad Eagleberger
- Gaten Matarazzo as Bubba
- Faith Margaret Kidman-Urban as Beatrice and Sophie
- Sunday Rose Kidman-Urban as Lily and Isla
- Colleen Ballinger as Roxanne
- David Dobrik as Axel
- Alex Hirsch as Steve
- Mason Ramsey as Oliver
- Thurop Van Orman as Duck and Seal
- Nolan North as Terence, replacing Sean Penn from the first film.

== Production ==
=== Development ===
A sequel to The Angry Birds Movie was announced in August 2016. It was directed by Thurop Van Orman, co-directed by John Rice, and written by Peter Ackerman. John Cohen returned from The Angry Birds Movie to serve as producer, with animation again handled by Sony Pictures Imageworks. Imageworks' sister studio Sony Pictures Animation also released the film under their banner, despite having dropped out of co-producing the project beforehand and had not co-produced the first film either.

In the summer of 2017, production designer Pete Oswald stated that the sequel would be more of an adventure movie that introduces new characters and locations into the world first established in The Angry Birds Movie. While he was not in a position to offer further details about the plot and characters, which remained unknown until the months before the film's release, he expressed hope that it would be a better film than the first installment.

The creative decision to break from the games' source material and have the birds and pigs end their conflict and form an alliance to face a greater threat was one that was made out of a desire to surprise audiences with a new experience with the same characters, as well as attempt to outdo what was accomplished in the first film with an unprecedented level of creative freedom available. Josh Gad stated that the production team went forward with such idea because it was not only an "ingenious" one, but also because they felt it would feel most appropriate in light of the increasingly polarized political climate at the time, as people who disagree on significant issues struggle to find common ground.

=== Casting ===
In April 2018, the majority of the voice cast was announced. Jason Sudeikis, Josh Gad, Danny McBride, Maya Rudolph, Bill Hader, and Peter Dinklage reprised their roles from the first film. Leslie Jones voiced a new female villain, revealed to be Zeta in the teaser trailer. In December 2018, Nicki Minaj joined the cast of the film. Upon its release, the teaser trailer briefly revealed that Hal, a green boomerang bird from the games and the first film, would return in the sequel, with Anthony Padilla returning to voice Hal. The following day, producer John Cohen announced in a tweet that Awkwafina will voice Courtney, the first named female pig in the Angry Birds franchise that briefly appeared in the teaser.

When the film's first full trailer was released on March 27, 2019, more details about the sequel's characters and their voice roles were revealed. Among several new characters confirmed to appear in the movie was Silver, a bird first introduced in the Angry Birds 2 game, voiced by Rachel Bloom, and Ella, voiced by Dove Cameron. In June, People revealed the identity of the white bird living with Zeta in the teaser trailer as Debbie, voiced by Tiffany Haddish who was one of several voice actors not listed in the initial casting. Later that month, the final trailer revealed that Terence, a large red bird from the first film, would appear without Sean Penn reprising his voice role, and Nolan North replacing Penn.

=== Animation ===
Unlike the previous film, the sequel was co-produced with Rovio Animation and Sony Pictures Animation. While it was possible to reuse assets from the first film instead of starting from scratch, significant work was needed to make them compatible with new technological systems that were adopted in the past few years. The animators faced great challenges attempting to create more realistic feather systems for the Birds' plumage, even with the help of Sony Pictures Imageworks' existing feather system that was first used in Stuart Little (1999), especially when it came to designing the villain Zeta, the hardest character to animate in the film with over 1,000 controls, a very complex face structure and a tall, flexible torso. The team also faced a demanding task in designing visual effects for snow, ice, water and lava for the film and production was also affected by the unavailability of certain animators who were being used to complete Spider-Man: Into the Spider-Verse (2018) months prior, as well as the amount of time lost due to Sony moving the film's release date ahead by more than half a month.

== Music ==
Heitor Pereira, who previously composed the first film, returned to compose the score of The Angry Birds Movie 2. It is his fourth film with Sony Pictures Animation, as he previously scored The Smurfs (2011) and its sequel The Smurfs 2 (2013). On July 25, 2019, Kesha released her song "Best Day" for the film as a single. Days later, Luke Combs released a song, "Let's Just Be Friends" for the film as a single as well. Both singles were played in the film's end credits.

Also included on the film was Giacomo Puccini's aria "Un bel di vedremo" from his opera Madama Butterfly. This was credited as "Opera" by Heitor Pereira in the soundtrack.

The film's soundtrack, titled The Angry Birds Movie 2: Original Motion Picture Soundtrack was released on August 9, 2019, only in digital format and is available to download through payment platforms. It includes two songs previously unreleased and original from the movie: Luke Combs' "Let's Just Be Friends" and Kesha's "Best Day (Angry Birds 2 Remix)". The rest of the album consists of a compilation of eighteen classical pop music hits from the 1960s to 2000s decades, in different genres and various artists.

== Marketing ==
As with the first film, Sony also attempted to connect the film to certain social causes while marketing it, leveraging the premise of the threat of worlds being frozen to call attention to urgent action on climate change and using Silver, who is depicted as a technical expert, as a model to inspire more young women to pursue STEM disciplines.

=== Video games ===
The Angry Birds Movie 2 VR: Under Pressure
- Developer: XR Games
- Publishers: NA: Sony Pictures Virtual Reality; EU: XR Games
- Director: Jake Zim
- Producer: Joe Lawson
- Designer: Bobby Thandi
- Platform: PlayStation 4
- Release: WW: August 6, 2019
- Genres: Platform, action-adventure
- Modes: Single-player, multiplayer

A cooperative tie-in video game, The Angry Birds Movie 2 VR: Under Pressure, was released exclusively for the PlayStation 4's PlayStation VR system on August 6, 2019. The game takes place aboard the Piggy Gadget Lab that the main characters use to get to Eagle Island for the film's climactic confrontation.

Another virtual reality video game, The Angry Birds Movie 2: Prank Attack VR, was released in 2019 in the arcades by Hologate.

== Release ==
=== Theatrical ===
The Angry Birds Movie 2 was theatrically released in the United States on August 14, 2019, coinciding with the 10th anniversary of the debut of the original Angry Birds game. The film was originally scheduled to be released on September 20, September 6, and August 16. This was the last film from Sony Pictures Animation to have an exclusive theatrical release in the United States until Spider-Man: Across the Spider-Verse in June 2023 as several of its following movies were released by streaming services such as Netflix and Amazon Prime Video worldwide excluding China, where Sony still theatrically released the films.

The film's North American theatrical release was preceded by Hair Love (2019), a Kickstarter-funded campaign short film created by Matthew A. Cherry and Bruce W. Smith.

=== Home media ===
The Angry Birds Movie 2 was released on digital and Movies Anywhere by Sony Pictures Home Entertainment on October 29, 2019, with Blu-ray, Ultra HD Blu-ray, and DVD releases following on November 12. All releases include an animated short film entitled Live Stream. The Ultra HD Blu-ray version was the first release of its kind to be IMAX enhanced.

== Reception ==
=== Box office ===
The Angry Birds Movie 2 has grossed $41.7 million in the United States and Canada, and $110.1 million in other territories, for a worldwide total of $152.8 million.

In the United States and Canada, the film was projected to gross $16–18 million from 3,800 theaters over its first six days of release. It made $2.6 million on its first day, ranking fifth and $1.7 million on its second. It ended up making $16.2 million over the six-day span (including an opening weekend of $10.6 million), finishing in fifth. It was less than a third of the first film's $38.1 million debut, and was blamed on the marketing making the sequel look the same as the first, as well as the crowded marketplace. The Angry Birds Movie 2 completed its theatrical run in the United States and Canada on November 14, 2019.

=== Critical response ===
On the review aggregator website Rotten Tomatoes, 72% of 108 critics' reviews are positive, with an average rating of 5.7/10. The website's consensus reads: "Like its non-aerodynamic title characters, The Angry Birds Movie 2 takes improbable yet delightfully entertaining flight, landing humorous hits along the way." It is rated higher than the first film, and at the time of its release was the best-reviewed film adaptation of a video game on Rotten Tomatoes. (Note: In their Video Game Movies Ranked Worst to Best list, Rotten Tomatoes only included theatrically-released films with scores based on more than 20 reviews.) Metacritic, which uses a weighted average, assigned the film a score of 60 out of 100, based on 23 critics, indicating "mixed or average" reviews. Audiences polled by CinemaScore gave the film an average grade of "B+" on an A+ to F scale, the same score earned by its predecessor, and PostTrak gave the film a 4 out of 5 stars and 72% "definite recommend" from parents and kids under 12.

Guy Lodge of Variety summarized his review with: "Perked up by some ingenious slapstick and Leslie Jones' inspired voice work, this gumball-bright sequel to 2016's game-based spinoff is another unexpected pleasure." Sandie Chen of Common Sense Media gave the film a score of three out of five stars, stating, "Silly pranks, an ace voice cast, and a super-team mission storyline make this fast-paced sequel more fun than the original. It's a predictably well-intentioned second installment, in which the birds and pigs are forced to work together against an even more formidable foe. It also shows how Red's insecurity lingers, since he was only recently accepted and respected. Although some of the movie's jokes and sight gags are recycled (because, frankly, it's unlikely that little kids will ever get tired of naked piggy-butt jokes), the addition of the third mystery island is interesting enough to keep younger audiences guessing." Stephen Dalton of The Hollywood Reporter wrote, "It may lack the refined wit and revered pedigree of blue-chip animation franchises such as Toy Story, but it still ticks plenty of lightweight fun boxes for its prime target audience of younger children, with just enough adult humor to keep parents from yawning, too." Bob Hoose of Plugged In (publication) praised the humor, stating, "Surprisingly, the whole frenetic animated escapade ends up being pretty entertaining and funny. Even adults will, at some point, snort out an unexpected chortle." Simon Thompson of IGN gave the film a score of 6 out of 10, stating, "The Angry Birds Movie 2 does what you'd expect it to do, some nice touches move the franchise forward, but it could have dug deeper as some other franchises have. The whole is less than the sum of its parts, but those parts just about make the grade. Kids or a certain age will love it, and ultimately that's all that really matters here."

=== Accolades ===
List of awards and nominations
Award	Date	Category	Recipients	Result	Ref.
People's Choice Awards	November 10, 2019	Family Movie of 2019	The Angry Birds Movie 2	Nominated	
People's Choice Awards	November 10, 2019	Animated Movie Star of 2019	Awkwafina	Nominated	
Nickelodeon Kids' Choice Awards	May 2, 2020	Favorite Animated Movie	The Angry Birds Movie 2	Nominated	
Nickelodeon Kids' Choice Awards	May 2, 2020	Favorite Male Voice for an Animated Movie	Josh Gad (sharing his award with Frozen II)	Won	

== Sequel ==
On June 6, 2024, Rovio announced that a third film was in development, with new parent company Sega Sammy Group producing alongside Rovio Animation, Prime Focus Studios, One Cool Films, Flywheel Media, Rabbits Black, and Dentsu. John Rice has been attached to direct with Thurop Van Orman writing the screenplay and serving as executive producer while John Cohen, Dan Chuba, and Carla Connor are set to produce, while Jason Sudeikis and Josh Gad would reprise their roles as Red and Chuck, respectively.

On April 8, 2025, it was announced that Paramount Pictures had picked up the distribution rights for the third film, replacing Sony Pictures, and set a release date of January 29, 2027. Additionally, Emma Myers, Keke Palmer, Lily James, Tim Robinson, Walker Scobell, Sam Richardson, Maitreyi Ramakrishnan, Nikki Glaser, Marcello Hernandez, James Austin Johnson, Anna Cathcart, and Psalm West was confirmed to be in the cast, with Rachel Bloom and Danny McBride reprising their roles as Silver and Bomb. On September 18, 2025, the film was pushed back to December 23, 2026, along with MrBeast and Salish Matter joining the cast with Smosh creators Anthony Padilla and Ian Hecox reprising their roles as Hal and Bubbles, respectively.

== See also ==
- List of films based on video games
