= Yoo-Hoo (disambiguation) =

Yoo-Hoo or YooHoo may refer to:

- Yoo-hoo, a greeting or call for attention over distance
- Yoo-hoo, an American chocolate-flavored beverage
- The YooHoo & Friends stuffed toy line
  - The 2009 and 2012 YooHoo & Friends television series
  - YooHoo to the Rescue, another series related to YooHoo & Friends
- Slang for sexual intercourse

== Music ==
Songs

- "YooHoo", Al Jolson and Buddy DeSylva song
- "Yoo-Hoo!", song by Stephen Sondheim
- "YooHoo (Secret song)", a song by South Korean band Secret from their 2013 mini-album Letter from Secret
- "Minnie's Yoo-Hoo", a 1930 song written for the Mickey Mouse cartoon Mickey's Follies.
- "Yoo-Hoo", a song by Imperial Teen from their 1999 album What Is Not to Love
- "Yoo-Hoo", a song by Danger Mouse and Jemini from their 2003 album Ghetto Pop Life
- The Pinky Lee Show theme song "Yoo-hoo it's me/My name is Pinky Lee/I skip and run with lots of fun/For every he and she.."
- "Yoo Hoo", 1941 song by Ethel Crowninshield used to teach children to sing in 1950s and 1960s
