= List of YooHoo & Friends episodes =

YooHoo & Friends (Korean: 유후와 친구들; RR: Yuhuwa chingudeul) is a Korean animated children's television series based on the toyline of the same name, produced by Korean toy manufacturer Aurora World. The series debuted on the Korean broadcasting channel KBS2, and later on KBS1 from July 2, 2009 to April 9, 2015.

== Series overview ==
Season	Segments	Episodes	Originally released		
Season	Segments	Episodes	First released	Last released	Network
1	52	26	July 2, 2009	January 12, 2010	KBS2
2	56	28	October 21, 2013	May 24, 2014	KBS1
3	22	11	January 11, 2015	April 9, 2015	KBS1

== Episodes ==
=== Season 1 (2009–2010) ===
No.	Title	Directed by	Written by	Original release date
1	"Chewoo as a Baby Bird" "아기새가 된 츄우" "Disappeared Yootopia" "사라진 그리닛"	Kyungjun Choi	Unknown	July 2, 2009
2	"The Secret of Baobab Trees" "바오밥나무의 비밀" "Who Could Get Water First?" "누가빨리 물을 구해올까요?"	Kyungjun Choi	Unknown	July 10, 2009
3	"Across the Victoria Falls" "빅토리아 폭포를 건너자" "The Lion with Blue Mane" "파란머리사자"	Kyungjun Choi	Unknown	July 17, 2009
4	"Ahh! There's a Monster!" "으악, 괴물이 나타났다!" "Finding YooHoo!" "유후를 찾아라!"	Kyungjun Choi	Unknown	July 27, 2009
5	"Catch the Green Seed!" "그린 씨앗을 잡아라!" "Meeting the Meerkat Brothers" "미어캣 삼형제를 만나다!"	Kyungjun Choi	Unknown	July 31, 2009
6	"Nobody Can Stop" "미어캣 삼형제는 못 말려!" "The Stolen Encyclopedia" "백과사전을 도둑맞았어요!"	Kyungjun Choi	Unknown	August 7, 2009
7	"Desert Paradise" "사막의 낙원을 찾아서"	Kyungjun Choi	Unknown	August 14, 2009
8	"The Mysterious Pyramid" "피라미드의 수수께끼" "Finding the Fairy Chimneys" "요정들의 굴뚝을 찾아서"	Kyungjun Choi	Unknown	August 21, 2009
9	"Spooky Vampire Bats" "흡혈박쥐는 무서워" "Green Seed in the Lake" "씨앗이 호수에 빠졌어요"	Kyungjun Choi	Unknown	August 28, 2009
10	"Rooney the Musician" "음악가 루니" "Libee the Dandy" "멋쟁이 스라소니"	Kyungjun Choi	Unknown	September 4, 2009
11	"Whose Pouch Is It?" "씨앗 주머니는 누구 것일까요?" "Secrets of the Altamira Cave" "알타미라 동굴의 비밀"	Kyungjun Choi	Unknown	September 7, 2009
12	"Look for the Shiny Pebble" "반짝이는 돌 조각을 찾아라" "Chewoo Befriends the Youngest Meerkat" "막내 미어캣과 친해진 츄우"	Kyungjun Choi	Unknown	September 19, 2009
13	"Sleeping Pammee" "잠자는 숲 속의 패미" "Over the Altai Mountains" "알타이 산맥을 넘다"	Kyungjun Choi	Unknown	September 24, 2009
14	"RingRing the Panda" "판다 링링"	Kyungjun Choi	Unknown	September 25, 2009
15	"The Fake Meditator" "인도의 엉터리 명상가를 만나다" "Roodee Leaves the Group" "루디, 친구들을 떠나다"	Kyungjun Choi	Unknown	October 19, 2009
16	"Meerkat, the Great Inventor" "발명왕 미어캣" "Babysitting Time!" "아기 보기는 힘들어"	Kyungjun Choi	Unknown	October 23, 2009
17	"Josh the Chatterbox" "수다쟁이 조시를 만나다" "To Find the Invisible Island" "보이지 않는 섬을 찾아서"	Kyungjun Choi	Unknown	October 23, 2009
18	"Caught by Baboons" "눈 원숭이들에게 잡히다" "Another Paradise" "또 하나의 파라다이스"	Kyungjun Choi	Unknown	November 9, 2009
19	"Secrets of the Paradise" "파라다이스의 비밀" "Two Seeds" "두 개의 씨앗"	Kyungjun Choi	Unknown	November 9, 2009
20	"Cookie the South Pole Penguin" "남극의 꼬마펭귄 쿠키" "The Meerkat Conspiracy" "미어캣 삼형제의 음모"	Kyungjun Choi	Unknown	November 19, 2009
21	"Play Ball in Machu Picchu" "마추픽추 공놀이 대회" "What a Spectacle Bear Needs" "눈이 나쁜 안경곰"	Kyungjun Choi	Unknown	November 27, 2009
22	"Goodbye Pink Dolphin" "안녕, 분홍 돌고래!" "Roodee's Submarine" "루디의 잠수함"	Kyungjun Choi	Unknown	November 27, 2009
23	"Cactus Desert" "선인장 사막" "Beware! It's Hot!" "뜨거워, 조심해!"	Kyungjun Choi	Unknown	November 27, 2009
24	"The Lost Seed Pouch" "씨앗주머니를 빼앗기다" "The Sad Behind Story" "미어캣 삼형제, 씨앗주머니를 구하다"	Kyungjun Choi	Unknown	January 12, 2010
25	"The Beaver Brothers" "비버 형제의 댐 쌓기" "Lemmee, Save Us!" "레미, 우리를 구해줘!"	Kyungjun Choi	Unknown	January 12, 2010
26	"To the North Pole" "가자, 북극으로!" "Back to YooTopia" "다시 찾은 그리닛"	Kyungjun Choi	Unknown	January 12, 2010

=== Season 2 (2013–14) ===
On Amazon, 4 episodes have not been included in the English release.

No. overall	No. in season	Title	Directed by	Written by	Original release date
27	1	"Genius is 1% Inspiration and 99% Humor" "천재는 1%의 영감과 99%의 장난기로 만들어진다" "Pammee the Superstar" "패미 마돈나"	Chey Lee and SeungHwa Kim	Unknown	October 21, 2013
28	2	"A Leader's Burden" "리더는 괴로워" "The Precious Water" "물은 소중해"	Chey Lee and SeungHwa Kim	Unknown	October 28, 2013
29	3	"The Greenet Fruit Festival" "착한 악당" "Utopia Carnival" "가짜 유토피아"	Chey Lee and SeungHwa Kim	Unknown	November 1, 2013
30	4	"Bell Around Caramel's Neck" "고양이 방울" "So Hot" "덥다 더워"	Chey Lee and SeungHwa Kim	Unknown	November 8, 2013
31	5	"Friends Forever" "우리는 친구" "Oops and Koops Fall in Love" "사랑에 빠진 웁스와 쿱스"	Chey Lee and SeungHwa Kim	Unknown	November 16, 2013
32	6	"The Treasure Ship Quest" "보물선을 찾아라" "Nothing to Eat" "먹을 것이 없어"	Chey Lee and SeungHwa Kim	Unknown	November 25, 2013
33	7	"Made by Roodee" "루디의 발명품" "The Sleepwalking Monster" "몽유병 괴물"	Chey Lee and SeungHwa Kim	Unknown	December 6, 2013
34	8	"A Magical Spring" "신비의 샘물" "Chewoo Catches a Cold" "감기에 걸린 츄우"	Chey Lee and SeungHwa Kim	Unknown	December 12, 2013
35	9	"크리스마스의 해프닝" "The History of Oops and Koops" "웁스쿱스의 과거"	Chey Lee and SeungHwa Kim	Unknown	December 17, 2013
36	10	"Stop Being Lazy, YooHoo!" "개미와 유후" "Too Much Noise" "시끄럽지만 시끄럽지 않아!"	Chey Lee and SeungHwa Kim	Unknown	December 23, 2013
37	11	"모두 모두 해피뉴이어" "The Ocean's Black Spring" "바다 속 검은 샘"	Chey Lee and SeungHwa Kim	Unknown	January 2, 2014
38	12	"The Dinosaur's Fury" "공룡 대소동" "We Can't Live Without Roodee" "루디 없인 못 살아"	Chey Lee and SeungHwa Kim	Unknown	January 8, 2014
39	13	"The Best of the Best" "내가 제일 잘 나가" "Roodie's Two Faces" "두 얼굴의 루디"	Chey Lee and SeungHwa Kim	Unknown	January 21, 2014
40	14	"Fake Friends" "가짜 친구들" "The Legend of the Penguins" "전설의 펭귄"	Chey Lee and SeungHwa Kim	Unknown	January 29, 2014
41	15	"Pammee's Disappearance" "사라진 패미" "Rescue Pammee" "패미를 찾아라"	Chey Lee and SeungHwa Kim	Unknown	February 6, 2014
42	16	"Oh Dear, It Really Stinks" "냄새가 지독해" "Mr. DJ and Pammee" "라디오DJ와 패미"	Chey Lee and SeungHwa Kim	Unknown	February 10, 2014
43	17	"Caramel, the Spy" "스파이가 된 카라멜" "A Gift Gone Wrong" "잘못된 선물"	Chey Lee and SeungHwa Kim	Unknown	February 17, 2014
44	18	"달콤한 발렌타인 보내기" "Where are the Bees?" "소중한 꿀벌들"	Chey Lee and SeungHwa Kim	Unknown	February 24, 2014
45	19	"Chewoo's Dream" "츄우의 꿈" "I am the Older Brother" "누가 형이야?"	Chey Lee and SeungHwa Kim	Unknown	March 4, 2014
46	20	"Picasso - The Birth of Greenica" "피카소 - 그리니카의 탄생" "The Sun Has Disappeared" "사라진 태양"	Chey Lee and SeungHwa Kim	Unknown	March 17, 2014
47	21	"We Need Electricity" "전기가 부족해" "The Sea is Sick" "육지에 온 바다생물"	Chey Lee and SeungHwa Kim	Unknown	March 24, 2014
48	22	"그리닛의 바보는 누구?" "Who is Big Boss?" "빅보스는 누구일까?"	Chey Lee and SeungHwa Kim	Unknown	March 31, 2014
49	23	"YooHoo's Ghost Friend" "꼬마유령" "We are Best Buddies!" "최고의 친구들"	Chey Lee and SeungHwa Kim	Unknown	April 7, 2014
50	24	"Dance with Roodee" "루디와 함께 춤을" "Lemmee's Dictionary of Complaints" "레미가 달라졌어요"	Chey Lee and SeungHwa Kim	Unknown	April 14, 2014
51	25	"Pammee, the Sleeping Beauty" "잠자는 숲속의 패미" "The Magic Springs are Contaminated" "오염된 신비의 샘물"	Chey Lee and SeungHwa Kim	Unknown	April 28, 2014
52	26	"Crossing the Dangerous Desert" "공포의 사막을 건너라" "Guard the Water Balloon" "물풍선을 차지하라"	Chey Lee and SeungHwa Kim	Unknown	May 9, 2014
53	27	"Greenet is Flooded" "비처럼 홍수처럼" "There are Holes in the Ground" "땅에 구멍이 생겼어"	Chey Lee and SeungHwa Kim	Unknown	May 12, 2014
54	28	"We Need a Vacation" "휴가가 필요해" "The Real Big Boss" "빅보스의 정체"	Chey Lee and SeungHwa Kim	Unknown	May 24, 2014

=== Season 3 (2015) ===
Unlike the first two seasons, this season has not had an official English release on Amazon and Netflix.

No. overall	No. in season	Title	Directed by	Written by	Original release date
55	1	"인어의 전설" "성화봉송 대작전"	Unknown	Unknown	January 11, 2015
56	2	"내 어릴 적 꿈" "루디의 비밀책"	Unknown	Unknown	January 18, 2015
57	3	"박쥐는 누구 편일까?" "할로윈 대소동"	Unknown	Unknown	January 19, 2015
58	4	"매일매일 추수감사절" "돌아온 태권 호랑이"	Unknown	Unknown	January 26, 2015
59	5	"소원을 들어줘" "이상한 호두까기 인형"	Unknown	Unknown	February 2, 2015
60	6	"달려라 유후" "패션왕 웁스쿱스"	Unknown	Unknown	February 11, 2015
61	7	"나무를 지켜라" "수다쟁이의 탄생"	Unknown	Unknown	March 1, 2015
62	8	"그리닛은우리땅" "달팽이의꿈"	Unknown	Unknown	March 9, 2015
63	9	"그리닛이 최고야" "고약한 향수"	Unknown	Unknown	March 16, 2015
64	10	"감기 대소동" "나는 누구일까"	Unknown	Unknown	March 24, 2015
65	11	"이상한 소" "빨리 빨리"	Unknown	Unknown	April 9, 2015
