= YooHoo & Friends (2009 TV series) =

South Korean preschool animated television series

- Hangul: 유후와 친구들
- Hanja: 유후와 親舊들
- RR: Yuhuwa chingudeul
- MR: Yuhuwa ch'in'gudŭl
- Genre: Adventure; Animated; Comedy
- Based on: YooHoo & Friends by Aurora World
- Directed by: Kyungjun Choi (season 1); Chey Lee (season 2); SeungHwa Kim (season 2)
- Country of origin: South Korea
- Original language: Korean
- No. of seasons: 3
- No. of episodes: 65 (130 segments) (list of episodes)

Production
- Producers: Johen Lim (season 1); Chey Lee (season 2)
- Running time: 13 minutes
- Production company: Aurora World

Original release
- Network: KBS2 (2009); KBS1 (2013–15)
- Release: July 2, 2009 – April 9, 2015

Related
- YooHoo & Friends (2012 TV series); YooHoo to the Rescue

YooHoo & Friends (Korean: 유후와 친구들) is a South Korean animated preschool television series produced by Aurora World. The series is based on the toyline of the same name. The series focuses on a group of young animals that accidentally get sent to Earth, and must find the missing magical seeds of the Tree of Life to get back to their home.

The series initially debuted on KBS2 on July 2, 2009 for one season. Two more seasons of the show would then air, running from October 21, 2013 to April 9, 2015 on KBS1; the art style and character designs also received an update with these seasons. The show was not renewed for a fourth season.

In 2012, an official English gag dub/retelling of the same name, loosely based on the first season of the series, was released, created by David Feiss and produced by Toonzone Studios. It was made for Western audiences to relate to the series more, but was panned by audiences and critics and never got a second season. Following a failed lawsuit initiated by Toonzone over the series' contractual rights, Aurora World sold the franchise to Lawless Entertainment in 2014. An English redubbing of the 2009 series, this time faithful to its original source material, would also be released in 2013, effectively replacing Feiss' adaptation.

In 2019, a computer-animated reboot series based on the franchise, YooHoo to the Rescue, was released on Netflix.

== Plot ==
=== Season 1 ===
Season 1 features a story about a group of anthropomorphic animals, mostly based on endangered species, who grow the Tree of Life in their habitat Yootopia. They are at risk of extinction because of worsening environmental conditions, but when all the seeds are accidentally blown away to Earth, the group accidentally gets sent down as well. Now being separated from their home, YooHoo and his friends go on adventures to find the missing magical seeds of the Tree of Life, avoiding danger and receiving help from new friends made along their journey as they retrieve each green seed one by one.

=== Season 2 ===
After reclaiming all of the green seeds and returning to Yootopia, YooHoo and his friends live peacefully until two mysterious crocodiles, Oops and Koops, working for their corrupt leader Big Boss, arrive at YooHoo's world to capture him and his friends and sell them to the black market. YooHoo and his friends team up to foil their plans, as well as save Yootopia.

== Episodes ==
Season	Segments	Episodes	Originally released		
Season	Segments	Episodes	First released	Last released	Network
1	52	26	July 2, 2009	January 12, 2010	KBS2
2	56	28	October 21, 2013	May 24, 2014	KBS1
3	22	11	January 11, 2015	April 9, 2015	KBS1

== Characters ==
There are five main characters in the series – YooHoo, Pammee, Roodee, Chewoo, and Lemmee.

- YooHoo (유후; voiced by Jeon Suk-gyeong) – A cream and grey Senegal bushbaby with blue eyes and a blue and grey striped tail. He is the main protagonist of the series; he is usually an excellent leader, being the maturest and nicest to everyone of his friends and keeps the team together. His goal is to save Yootopia and find all of the green seeds. His catchphrase is "YooHoo!" As of Season 2, he now carries a small brown bag at important situations.
- Pammee (패미; voiced by Yu Ji-won) – A pink and white fennec fox kit with pink eyes, and a pink and white striped tail. She is described as a princess due to her shy and girly nature, constantly finding random things romantic. She is also very optimistic, and is usually the voice of reason to the entire group. Pammee can hear things that her friends can't due to her huge ears, and she is able to converse with the nature. As of Season 2, she now officially wears a pink bow at the right side of her head.
- Roodee (루디; voiced by Um Sang-hyun) – A yellow and brown capuchin monkey with yellow eyes and an orange and brown striped tail, described as the inventor of the group. He is the smartest of the team, able to construct complex inventions from twigs and leaves and usually reads his guidebook for clues. He holds a persistent antagonism with Lemmee and consistently argues with him. As of Season 2, he now wears glasses.
- Chewoo (츄우; voiced by Han Shin-jeong) – A red squirrel with white stripes and pink eyes. She is described as the cheerleader, and keeping to her role, she is very hyperactive, and always cheerful. Her hyperactive nature constantly gets her into trouble, but sometimes she never thinks twice about her actions; more often than not, she helps the team accomplish their task. She is usually the cause of the events of the first season and the reason why all the Green Seeds are scattered around the world. As of Season 2, she is now shown wearing a green hat.
- Lemmee (레미; voiced by Song Jeong-hui in Season 1 and Lee Won-chan in Season 2) – A grey and white ring-tailed lemur with yellow eyes, black eye markings, and a grey and white striped tail. He is described as a sourpuss, and is in general the outcast of the group. Unsurprisingly, he is narcissistic, selfish and sadistic, sometimes often argues with Roodee and later, with YooHoo. However, despite being grumpy, he sometimes displays his nice side to his friends, often giving them some good advice at some situations. Lemmee has a crush on Pammee in Season 2, usually hiding it from his friends. As of Season 2, he wears a red bowtie.
- Big Boss (빅 보스; voiced by Kim Doo-hee) – A sinister large black bear who is the villain of the series; he first appeared in Season 2 and his face is never seen.
- Oops & Koops (웁스 & 쿱스; voiced by Lee Won-chan as Oops and Kim Doo-hee as Koops) – Duo of less intelligent alligators who are henchmen of Big Boss and usually put "Oop" (as Oops) or "Koop" (as Koops) at the end of the quote.

== Production ==
YooHoo & Friends was developed in 2007, and was created to teach children about the protection and preservation of the environment. Season 1 of the series was animated by nSac Entertainment, and Studio Vandal and MICO Studio animated Season 2. The series lasted for three seasons and 65 episodes, and officially ended in 2015. Lawless Entertainment now currently owns the license for the series' distribution in North America.

== Broadcast ==
YooHoo & Friends debuted in South Korea on KBS2, and later on KBS1 from July 2, 2009 to April 11, 2015.

In the US, the first two seasons of the series was made available on Netflix on September 1, 2017. They were later removed on September 1, 2019. The first two seasons are also available on Amazon, but four episodes are missing from Season 2. It is also available to watch on Tubi for free in the US. In the Mexico,It was broadcast on Canal Once in 2015 on its children's programming block, Once Niños and its final broadcast was in April 2018
