= YooHoo to the Rescue =

Animated children's TV series

- Genre: Adventure; Educational; Comedy
- Based on: YooHoo & Friends by Aurora World
- Directed by: Horak Kim
- Voices of: Kira Buckland; Ryan Bartley; Bryce Papenbrook; Cassandra Lee Morris; Lucien Dodge; Kyle Hebert; Erica Mendez
- Composer: Lorenzo Castelli
- Countries of origin: South Korea; Italy
- Original language: English
- No. of seasons: 3
- No. of episodes: 52

Production
- Executive producers: Jay Noh; Orlando Corradi; Matteo Corradi
- Producers: Giwon Goo; Paolo Zecca; Albert H. Lee; Federico Faccini
- Running time: 12 minutes
- Production companies: Aurora World; Mondo TV

Original release
- Network: Netflix
- Release: March 15, 2019 – March 25, 2020

Related
- YooHoo & Friends (2009 TV series); YooHoo & Friends (2012 TV series)

YooHoo to the Rescue is an English-language Italian-Korean animated children's television series produced by Aurora World and Mondo TV. It is the third TV series based on the YooHoo & Friends franchise, and serves as a revival of the franchise. The show is the first Netflix original series for children from South Korea.

In a series of magical missions, quick-witted YooHoo and his can-do crew travel the globe to help animals in need. It was released March 15, 2019 on Netflix with the first 26 episodes. The next 13 episodes were released on October 11, 2019, and the final 13 were released on March 25, 2020.

== Plot ==
YooHoo to the Rescue follows the adventures of five animal friends who live in the magical land of YooTopia, a land far outside the Milky Way. In each episode, they travel to a new destination to help animals in trouble and make new friends along the way. When there is a problem on YooTopia, the colorful fruits of the Sparkling Tree begin to fade. The friends get their special gadgets and board their ship Wonderbug, a ladybug-like aircraft. They use wit, teamwork, and special gadgets to solve problems and help animals in need. Over the course of their adventures, they learn fun facts about a wide variety of environments and make friends with animals.

== Characters ==
- YooHoo (voiced by Kira Buckland; John Hasler in the UK dub) – A male cream and gray Senegal bushbaby. He is the captain of the crew.
- Pammee (voiced by Ryan Bartley; Jenny Bryce in the UK dub) – A female pink and white fennec fox. She is the navigator.
- Lemmee (voiced by Bryce Papenbrook; David Holt in the UK dub) – A male gray and white ring-tailed lemur. He is the doctor.
- Chewoo (voiced by Cassandra Lee Morris; Harriet Kershaw in the UK dub) – A female red squirrel. She is the photographer.
- Roodee (voiced by Lucien Dodge; Steven Kynman in the UK dub) – A male blond capuchin monkey. He is the inventor.
- Slo (voiced by Kyle Hebert; David Rintoul in the UK dub) – A male sloth. He is the caretaker of the Sparkling Tree.
- Lora (voiced by Erica Mendez; Tamsin Heatley in the UK dub) – A female scarlet macaw. She is YooTopia's messenger.

== Production ==
In 2015, Aurora World and Mondo TV Suisse were intending to develop a computer-animated television series based on the YooHoo & Friends toy franchise. Some sources had also reported this revival series as a "fourth season" of the original 2009 Korean series. Under the working title of YooHoo & Friends 3D (also referred to as YooHoo and Friends: The New Adventures), the series would have comprised 52 11-minute episodes, and was originally set for a fall 2016 release, before being postponed to spring 2017.

The series was meant to follow YooHoo and his friends Roodee, Lemmee, Chewoo, and Pammee, heading off into space in order to discover why garbage is falling from the sky in YooTopia, and saving the universe from being endangered. Big Boss, and his henchmen Oops and Coops, a pair of villains which were introduced in the second season of the 2009 series, were also intended to return in this revival. Alan Keane, head writer and story editor of the series, indirectly alluded to the genre of the series being an "action comedy".

Hot Drop Films, an Irish production company, was responsible for the scriptwriting of the series, with some of the staff revealing that they worked on this series through their LinkedIn pages; Hot Drop Films worked with Aurora World and Mondo TV previously on Cuby Zoo. Voice work for the series was also recorded in Audioworks Producers Group in New York, and would have featured Robin Virginie (Chewoo), Mike Pollock (Slo) and Paul Castro Jr. According to Erin Cousins, who was responsible for conducting research for the series' episodes, the relationship between Aurora World and Hot Drop Films "dissolved" in 2016; following this, production on YooHoo & Friends 3D ceased that year as the series was then overhauled and retooled entirely from scratch.

By the time Netflix became a distributor for the series in 2017, YooHoo to the Rescue then entered development, with production services still being handled by Aurora World and Mondo TV. The finalized version of this concept featured a new writing team (composed of South Korean writers), and the voice work was relocated to Bang Zoom! Entertainment in Los Angeles; all of the writers and voice actors contracted prior to work on YooHoo & Friends 3D were replaced. As well, the series' target demographic was reverted to that of preschoolers (sharing that of the original 2009 Korean series), ditching any active antagonistic threat that the revival was originally planning to incorporate. The premise of the final series is also more standard, simply following YooHoo and his friends going on episodic magical missions all around YooTopia to assist other animals in need.

This was notably the first computer-animated media in the YooHoo & Friends franchise, as the previous series were 2D animated. A British dub by VSI Studios was produced and released to Netflix.

== Episodes ==
=== Series overview ===
Season	Episodes	Originally released
1	26	March 15, 2019
2	13	October 11, 2019
3	13	March 25, 2020

=== Season 1 (2019) ===
No. overall	No. in season	Title	Directed by	Written by	Executive Story Editor	Original release date
1	1	"The Stubborn Rhinoceros"	Horak Kim	Hyejung Jang	Joseph Purdy	March 15, 2019
The crew meets a rhino who headbutts into everything he sees. Instead of apologizing to his friends, the rhino runs away and hides. The crew finds the missing rhino, and realizes that he wasn't intentionally headbutting, but in fact, is very near-sighted, thus not being able to see the proximity. The crew helps him see better again, and the rhino learns to apologize to his friends.
2	2	"The Bat Sisters and the Starry Night"	Horak Kim	Hyejung Jang	Joseph Purdy	March 15, 2019
The crew meets a worried bat who is looking for her baby sister. She was teaching her younger sister how to fly at night, when she suddenly disappeared. The crew finds the younger bat, who confesses that she is afraid of the night because of all the scary noises. The crew shows her the beauty of the night sky and helps her overcome her fear, and fly.
3	3	"The Froggy Trio"	Horak Kim	Sunwoo Kang	Joseph Purdy	March 15, 2019
The crew meets three frog brothers who are entering a choir competition. The neighborhood has suffered a drought recently, and the frog brothers are experiencing sore throat, which would prevent them from entering the competition. The crew helps draw water from an underground reservoir and help the frogs prepare for the competition in the best condition.
4	4	"The Leap of the Snow Leopard"	Horak Kim	Hyejung Jang	Joseph Purdy	March 15, 2019
The crew meets a snow leopard who is trying to visit her long-time friend after the bridge that used to connect their territories collapsed. The snow leopard, with the help of the crew, makes a huge leap on the cliff, and gets to the other side. She is reunited with her best friend.
5	5	"Down in the Rabbit Hole!"	Horak Kim	Jimin Ahn	Joseph Purdy	March 15, 2019
The crew meets a marmot who is waiting for his bunny friends for the Spring Fair. As the bunnies are unusually late, the crew and the marmot travel down the underground rabbit burrow to try to find and wake the bunnies up.
6	6	"Fly, Sugar Glider, Fly!"	Horak Kim	Hyejung Jang	Joseph Purdy	March 15, 2019
The crew meets a sugar glider lost in the woods. She wants to go back home, and the crew pieces together clues to locate her home. The sugar glider demonstrates her ability to fly, which surprises Chewoo, a fellow squirrel.
7	7	"Tail-Fishing with the Polar Bear"	Horak Kim	Hyejung Jang	Joseph Purdy	March 15, 2019
The crew meets a polar bear cub in the middle of the ocean, who has swum out to the sea to fish for his friends. They rescue the cub and help the bear by luring the fish using their tails as baits. The crew and the cub return to the polar bear island and feed the hungry polar bears.
8	8	"The Red Panda Masterpiece"	Horak Kim	Sunwoo Kang	Joseph Purdy	March 15, 2019
The crew meets three red panda sisters. The oldest sister is a sensitive painter who doesn't eat or sleep while she's working. The crew and her worried younger sisters try to help her but instead accidentally mess up her painting.
9	9	"The Otter Brotherhood"	Horak Kim	Jimin Ahn	Joseph Purdy	March 15, 2019
The crew meets two otter brothers. The elder brother asks the crew to babysit for his troublesome baby brother while he goes on a trip. The crew is exhausted following the baby otter around, and he runs away to a cave. The crew follows him to the cave, and finds out that the baby otter was causing trouble to look for his treasured pebble, which was a birthday gift from his older brother.
10	10	"Sweet Dreams, Baby Moon Bear"	Horak Kim	Sunwoo Kang	Joseph Purdy	March 15, 2019
The crew meets a moon bear cub who needs help finding his missing friends. After a search, the crew realizes that all the friends have gone into hibernation. The crew helps the unwilling moon bear go to bed by babysitting him.
11	11	"Keeping Cool with the Giant Panda"	Horak Kim	Hyejung Jang	Joseph Purdy	March 15, 2019
The crew meets a giant panda who is suffering from a heatstroke. They decide to bring some ice back from the icecap on top of the faraway mountain while one of the crew plays with the panda.
12	12	"Chameleon, the King of Hide-and-Seek"	Horak Kim	Sunwoo Kang	Joseph Purdy	March 15, 2019
The crew meets a chameleon who enjoys scaring his friends with his camouflage during the game of hide-and-seek. His turtle friend gets so surprised and decides to never play with the chameleon. The crew and the turtle camouflage to one-up the chameleon, but the plan backfires.
13	13	"Eating Healthy with the Blue-Footed Sula Birds"	Horak Kim	Sunwoo Kang	Joseph Purdy	March 15, 2019
The crew meets blue-footed Sula birds. One of the birds is a picky eater and only eats a certain kind of fish. His pretty blue foot turned grey due to malnutrition. The crew catches various types of fish and cooks them so that the picky-eating bird can enjoy them.
14	14	"The Busiest Beaver"	Horak Kim	Hyejung Jang	Joseph Purdy	March 15, 2019
The crew meets a beaver who is busy building his dam, and generally creating a mess everywhere. When his dam gets destroyed, and the beaver is distraught as the mess he left everywhere prevents him to build another one quickly. The crew helps him organize the tools and resources, and help the beaver build a new dam.
15	15	"Woodpecker, the Tree Doctor"	Horak Kim	Sunwoo Kang	Joseph Purdy	March 15, 2019
The crew meets a couple of animals who complain about the loud noise made by a certain woodpecker. The crew finds the woodpecker, but realizes that he was actually trying to cure the trees from bad worms. The crew helps the woodpecker rest, and help catch the worms.
16	16	"The Winterland Reindeer"	Horak Kim	Hyejung Jang	Joseph Purdy	March 15, 2019
The crew meets a reindeer who runs away from an avalanche. They get trapped in the snow together. The crew and the reindeer work together to escape the snow.
17	17	"The Flight of the Whooping Crane"	Horak Kim	Hyejung Jang	Joseph Purdy	March 15, 2019
The crew meets a whooping crane who injured his wing while on a migration with his friends and was left behind. The crane refuses to fly, but the crew helps him get his energy back and follow his friends.
18	18	"Meerkats, Assemble!"	Horak Kim	Hyejung Jang	Joseph Purdy	March 15, 2019
The crew meets meerkats duo who has lost the sacred stone that they have been guarding. The meerkats blame the crew, but soon confesses that it got blown away by the wind. The crew helps them find the stone.
19	19	"The Buffalo's Favorite Friend"	Horak Kim	Sunwoo Kang	Joseph Purdy	March 15, 2019
The crew meets a buffalo who has chased away his chatty friend, a cattle egret. After his friend has left, the buffalo realizes that the bird was helping him chase away the flies and insects. The crew helps these best friends restore their friendship.
20	20	"The Flamingo Ballet"	Horak Kim	Sunwoo Kang	Joseph Purdy	March 15, 2019
The crew meets two flamingos who needs help locating a friend who is in fact feigning sickness. YooHoo and Roodee get into danger while searching for the missing flamingo, who has to overcome "the boy who cried wolf" situation.
21	21	"Penguins on the Rocking Rock"	Horak Kim	Hyejung Jang	Joseph Purdy	March 15, 2019
The crew meets two rock-hopper penguins who compete for the highest rock. In the midst of competition, they hop on an unstable rock which wobbles. Both penguins fall down into a hole. The crew rescues them from the hole.
22	22	"The Thirsty Hippos"	Horak Kim	Hyejung Jang	Joseph Purdy	March 15, 2019
The crew meets three hippos who ask to seek out the cause of the recent drought. They bring one of the hippos to the source of water and sees that it is being blocked by coconut shells. The hippo admits to littering after eating the coconuts which somehow ended up clogging the water source, resulting in the dry pond. The crew helps with the clogging, and the hippo promises not to litter.
23	23	"The Sprinting Cheetahs"	Horak Kim	Sunwoo Kang	Joseph Purdy	March 15, 2019
The crew meets the cheetahs who hold a sprint competition to elect the captain of the pack. One of the cheetahs gets injured while running. The first-place cheetah stops the competition and runs to the aid of the injured friend. The friends elect the first-place cheetah to be the captain not because of her running, but because of her heart.
24	24	"The Smiling Quokkas"	Horak Kim	Hyejung Jang	Joseph Purdy	March 15, 2019
The crew meets two quokkas who are quarreling over the nice cool shade under the tree. They all embark on the journey to find a large enough tree that can shelter both quokkas. After finding the perfect tree, they take a nap and wake up to find that the shade moved. The quokkas realize that it wasn't each other who took the shaded spot in the first place, and reconcile.
25	25	"Perfect Home for the Spectacled Bear"	Horak Kim	Hyejung Jang	Joseph Purdy	March 15, 2019
The crew meets a spectacled bear whose treehouse was destroyed by a storm the night before. The crew tries to look for the perfect tree to build a house on.
26	26	"Ibex, the Rock Climbing Champion"	Horak Kim	Jimin Ahn	Joseph Purdy	March 15, 2019
The crew meets an ibex who got his head stuck while trying to lick salts off of the mountain rocks. After the crew helps the ibex, he travels further up the mountain, demonstrating his rock-climbing prowess. After he injures himself while climbing too recklessly, the crew helps him again and he promises to be more careful.

=== Season 2 (2019) ===
No. overall	No. in season	Title	Directed by	Written by	Executive Story Editor	Original release date
27	1	"The Elephant's Magnificent Trunk"	Yong Shik Kim	Hyejung Jang	TBA	October 11, 2019
The gang helps a meerkat show his depressed elephant friend how impressive his trunk actually is.
28	2	"Alligator, the Treasure Hunter"	Yong Shik Kim	Hyejung Jang	TBA	October 11, 2019
An alligator calls the crew to help her search the ocean for a lost necklace.
29	3	"Kakapo's Sleepless Night"	Yong Shik Kim	Hyejung Jang	TBA	October 11, 2019
The team helps a kākāpō find a mysterious nocturnal bird singing in the woods.
30	4	"Emperor Tamarin Rivalry"	Ying Shik Kim	Sunwoo Kang	TBA	October 11, 2019
Two emperor tamarins crossing a bridge refuse to get out of each other's way, and won't stop arguing or passing the blame. The crew's mission? Helping the 2 resolve their differences and recover the necklaces.
31	5	"The Book of Giraffe"	Yong Shik Kim	Hyejung Jang	TBA	October 11, 2019
The crew assists a giraffe in retrieving a survival guide from a protective eagle.
32	6	"Snowy Owl Needs Some Sleep!"	Yong Shik Kim	Sunkyung Lim	TBA	October 11, 2019
A snowy owl calls the crew to help deal with a noisy neighbor so he can get some sleep. As it turns out, it's another owl, and the crew end up showing the two a glimpse of each other's lifestyles.
33	7	"Two-Humped Camel, the Desert Messenger"	Yong Shik Kim	Jimin Ahn	TBA	October 11, 2019
A bactrian camel mailman has lost his letters and packages, including a birthday present, in the desert. YooHoo and crew to the Rescue!
34	8	"The Brave Frill-necked Lizard"	Yong Shik Kim	Minyoung & Doyoung Chang	TBA	October 11, 2019
YooHoo and company help a cowardly Frill-necked lizard retrieve a ball in a dark cave. However, they have to make sure he looks brave in front of his friends.
35	9	"Bowerbird's Bower Party"	Yong Shik Kim	Jimin Ahn	TBA	October 11, 2019
The crew help a vogelkop bowerbird prepare a show and nest for his friend to see.
36	10	"Home Improvement with Red Fox"	Yong Shik Kim	Hyejung Jang	TBA	October 11, 2019
Twin red fox siblings call the crew to help redecorate their den. Unfortunately, their ideas on the concept of a pretty den clash with each other.
37	11	"Armadillo, the Pathfinder"	Yong Shik Kim	Sunkyung Lim	TBA	October 11, 2019
YooHoo and his friends help a lost armadillo find his way home, but he insists on rolling home, which makes it harder to help him.
38	12	"Clumsy Clumsy Platypus"	Yong Shik Kim	Minyoung & Doyoung Chang	TBA	October 11, 2019
The crew set off to help a platypus find his friend, who has his school notebook by mistake.
39	13	"Keeping it Fresh for the Baby Okapi"	Yong Shik Kim	Sunkyung Lim	TBA	October 11, 2019
A mother okapi calls the crew to help find her son, who turns out unwilling to return home out of boredom.

=== Season 3 (2020) ===
No. overall	No. in season	Title	Directed by	Written by	Executive Story Editor	Original release date
40	1	"Pika's Pine Cone Collection"	Yong Shik Kim	Sunkyung Lim	TBA	March 25, 2020
The gang helps a pika deal with her excessively large collection of pine cones, but she has an obsession and keeps collecting so much that there isn't any room in her new homes.
41	2	"The Siberian Tiger's Playground"	Yong Shik Kim	Hyejung Jang	TBA	March 25, 2020
A Siberian Tiger didn't get replies from invites to his siblings, leading the crew to go on a search for them.
42	3	"Hummingbird's Flight Test"	Yong Shik Kim	Sunkyung Lim	TBA	March 25, 2020
YooHoo and friends set out to help a hummingbird out with her flight test, particularly where she has to stop in mid-air.
43	4	"Searching for the Golden Leaf with Elephant Shrew"	Yong Shik Kim	Sunwoo Kang	TBA	March 25, 2020
The gang helps an Elephant Shrew search for her brother, who left on a quest without letting her know.
44	5	"Cozumel Raccoon, the Forest Guardian"	Yong Shik Kim	Hyejung Jang	TBA	March 25, 2020
A cozumel raccoon calls the crew to help search the mangrove forest for crabs to eat. It turns out a large rock is blocking an important waterway for the forest.
45	6	"Albatross' Great Challenge"	Yong Shik Kim	Minyoung & Doyoung Chang	TBA	March 25, 2020
Yoohoo and friends help an albatross meet up with an old friend, by making sure he can fly and glide on the day of the meeting.
46	7	"Sunbathing with Sungazers"	Yong Shik Kim	Sunkyung Lim	TBA	March 25, 2020
The gang helps a group of sungazer lizards bring their reclusive, sluggish and shy friend outside for her scales to harden in the sunlight.
47	8	"The Sea Turtle Paradise Island"	Yong Shik Kim	Minyoung & Doyoung Chang	TBA	March 25, 2020
A sea turtle calls the crew to get a bucket off his head. Inviting them to some fun in the sun, a post-meal cleanup reveals that the turtle has a bad habit of littering. Things come full circle when the carelessly disposed trash washes up on the beach, calling the crew to teach him how to recycle.
48	9	"Shoebill, the Bird Model"	Yong Shik Kim	Sunkyung Lim	TBA	March 25, 2020
YooHoo and friends set off to help a shoebill learn to be a model for his hippopotamus friend to photograph.
49	10	"Smile with Mandrill"	Yong Shik Kim	Minyoung & Doyoung Chang	TBA	March 25, 2020
The gang helps a mandrill reconnect with his rabbit friend by teaching him how to smile and express himself in more recognizable ways.
50	11	"Congo Peafowl, the Treasure Hunter"	Yong Shik Kim	Minyoung & Doyoung Chang	TBA	March 25, 2020
A squirrel calls the crew to help him and a congo peacock look for treasure.
51	12	"The Lazy Koala"	Yong Shik Kim	Hyejung Jang	TBA	March 25, 2020
YooHoo and friends set off to help a pair of koalas move their sleepy friend to a leafier part of a eucalyptus forest, but he's to lazy to move anywhere fast and constantly procrastinates.
52	13	"Hawaiian Crow's Dream Comes True"	Yong Shik Kim	Minyoung & Doyoung Chang	TBA	March 25, 2020
The gang helps a Hawaiian crow fulfill his dream of becoming a chef, but his cooking skills are less than palatable.

== Media information ==
Mondo TV secured a global licensing and merchandising deal with Panini that marketed a line of products that include stickers, trading cards and photocards, which launched in early 2018.
