= Miss Chinese International Pageant 2007 =

- Date: January 20, 2007
- Presenters: Eric Tsang, Derek Li, Eric Moo
- Entertainment: Hacken Lee
- Venue: Foshan City News & Broadcast Centre, Foshan, China
- Broadcaster: TVB
- Entrants: 21
- Placements: 10
- Winner: Sarah Song; Sydney, Australia
- Congeniality: Parichart Wisutthiphat 林雅志; Bangkok, Thailand

Miss Chinese International Pageant 2007 was held on January 20, 2007 in Foshan, China. Foshan would go on to host the pageant for two more years. Miss Chinese International 2006 Ina Lu of Johannesburg, South Africa crowned Sarah Song of Sydney as the new winner. Song is the second winner from Sydney.

== Pageant information ==
The theme to this year's pageant is "International Beauty, Competing in China" 「國際群芳 競艶中華」. The Masters of Ceremonies include Eric Tsang, Derek Li and Eric Moo. Special performing guest was cantopop singer Hacken Lee. This year marked the first year where delegates representing Mainland Chinese regions were able to compete. This is also the second year where the contest took place in Mainland China (2002 was first). The delegate from Johannesburg, (20) Ivy Lu is the younger sister of Miss Chinese International 2006, Ina Lu. Ivy placed 1st runner-up in this year's competition.

== Results ==
Placement	Contestant	City Represented	Country Represented
Miss Chinese International 2007	Sarah Song 宋熙年	Sydney	Australia
1st Runner-Up	Ivy Lu 呂怡萱	Johannesburg	South Africa
2nd Runner-Up	Sherry Chen 陳爽	Toronto	Canada
Top 5 Finalists	Sirena Wang 王思寧; Yvonne Chapman 彭美齡	New York City; Calgary	USA; Canada
Top 10 Semi-Finalists	Aimee Chan 陳茵媺; Louise Wu 吳如意; Chinzy Choi 蔡紫君; Susana SU 蘇小蕊; Ying Ying Zhao 趙瑩瑩	Hong Kong; San Francisco; Rotterdam; Vancouver; Nanning	Hong Kong; USA; Netherlands; Canada; China

=== Special awards ===
- Miss Friendship: Parichart Wisutthiphat 林雅志 (Bangkok)
- Audience Favourite Award: Sirena Wang 王思寧 (New York City)
- International Charm Award: Carol Li 李睿 (Pearl River)
- Chinese Culture Ambassador Award: Sarah Song 宋熙年 (Sydney)

== Contestant list ==
No.	Contestant Name	Represented City	Represented Country	Age	Chinese Origin
1	Tina Leung 梁皓婷	Seattle	USA	21	Guangdong
2	Aimee CHAN 陳茵媺	Hong Kong	Hong Kong	25	Fujian
3	Louise Wu 吳如意	San Francisco	USA	23	Fujian
4	Sherry Chen 陳爽	Toronto	Canada	23	Heilongjiang
5	Cai Ling Loui 廖彩伶	Singapore	Singapore	22	Nanian
6	Chinzy CHOI 蔡紫君	Rotterdam	Netherlands	21	Po On
7	Erwina CHANSON 陳雪芳	Tahiti	French Polynesia	24	Shenzhen
8	Carol LI 李睿	Pearl River	China	21	Hebei
9	Sirena WANG 王思寧	New York City	USA	21	Jilin
10	Mingzhu HE 赫明珠	Chicago	USA	21	Chongqing
11	Bamboo CUI 崔竹子	Montréal	Canada	20	Liuzhou
12	Sarah SONG 宋熙年	Sydney	Australia	21	Heshan
13	Yvonne CHAPMAN 彭美齡	Calgary	Canada	20	Shanghai
14	Susana SU 蘇小蕊	Vancouver	Canada	23	Jilin
15	Novel Lim 林秀婷	Kuala Lumpur	Malaysia	21	Zhongshan
16	Parichart WISUTTHIPHAT 林雅志	Bangkok	Thailand	23	Hainan
17	Rachel CARRASCO 陳香利	Manila	Philippines	19	Xiamen
18	Cindy HSU 徐自璇	Auckland	New Zealand	23	Taiwan
19	Jenifer JIANG 江珏	Melbourne	Australia	18	Nanjing
20	Ivy LU 呂怡萱	Johannesburg	South Africa	22	Taiwan
21	Ying Ying ZHAO 趙瑩瑩	Nanning	China	24	Heilongjiang
