= Armorsaurs =

- Promotional poster
- Genre: Action; Science fiction; Adventure; Fantasy
- Based on: Armored Saurus by Daewon Media
- Directed by: David Feiss
- Starring: Jailen Bates; Jacob Makabi; Avianna Mynhier; Sade Louise; Derrick Kwak; Yvonne Chapman; Andrew Russell; Carson Allen; Julien Kang
- Voices of: Michael Dorn
- Opening theme: "Armor Up Armosaurs" by Will Fuller, Alex Geringas, and Sqvare
- Ending theme: "Eyes" (From "Armored Saurus") by TOMORROW X TOGETHER
- Countries of origin: United States; United Kingdom; South Korea
- Original language: English
- No. of seasons: 1
- No. of episodes: 13

Production
- Executive producers: Isaac Larian; Tom van Waveren
- Running time: 22 minutes
- Production companies: MGA Entertainment; MGA Studios; CAKE Entertainment; Daewon Media (original footage)

Original release
- Network: Disney XD
- Release: October 13, 2025 – present

Armorsaurs is a live action/animated hybrid science fiction television series developed by, MGA Entertainment, MGA Studios, an audiovisual division of MGA Entertainment, and British producer and distribution outfit CAKE Entertainment for Disney XD. The show is based on the South Korean series Armored Saurus by Daewon Media and combines live-action with computer-generated dinosaurs and visual effects. It premiered on October 13, 2025, on Disney XD in the United States. The series was released on Disney+ on February 18, 2026.

== Premise ==
Millions of years ago, an alien race has taken all the dinosaurs away. Millions of years later, they have returned. In the near future where evil aliens threaten Earth, Armorsaurs follows a group of teenage pilots who are genetically linked to dinosaur companions thanks to the Avian Anomaly they have and are equipped with advanced battle armor. Together, they form part of a secret defense program known as the Armorsaurs Initiative. Each pilot bonds with a different dinosaur species, fusing ancient strength with futuristic technology to fight against an alien force attempting to reintroduce prehistoric war beasts to the planet.

== Characters ==
=== Armorsaur Pilots ===
- Liam Roberts (portrayed by Jailen Bates) - An Armorsaurs scientist who is partnered with Ajax. In battle, he wears red armor and wields a sword.
- T.J. Shirazi (portrayed by Jacob Makabi) - A professional basketball player who is partnered with Cobalt. In battle, he wears blue armor and wields a war hammer that has a laser gun form.
- Paloma Silva (portrayed by Avianna Mynhier) - A fashionista and professional vlogger who is partnered with Blaze. In battle, she wears yellow armor and wields a pair of nunchuks.
- Prisca Silva (portrayed by Sade Louise) - The younger tomboy sister of Paloma and the youngest of the Armorsaur pilots who is partnered with Pulse. In battle, she wears orange armor and wields a bo staff. She would later develop a psychic-type power that is connected with dinosaurs with the side effects of having headaches and nightmares.
- Joon Park (portrayed by Derrick Kwak) - An expert Taekwondo fighter who is partnered with Velox. In battle, he wears black armor and wields a bow and arrow.

==== Armorsaur Dinosaurs ====
The Armorsaurs are dinosaurs who can don the armor associated with their pilot's vehicles.

- Ajax - An armored Tyrannosaurus who becomes Liam's partner. His armor is equipped with retractable cables.
- Cobalt - An armored Triceratops who becomes T.J.'s partner. Her armor is equipped with large lasers.
- Blaze - An armored Velociraptor who becomes Paloma's partner. Her armor is equipped with retractable lasers. Unlike the other Armorsaurs, Blaze can partially bond with Paloma's vehicle parts due to her small size.
- Pulse - An armored Velociraptor and Blaze's sister who becomes Prisca's partner. Its armor is equipped with retractable blades. Unlike the other Armorsaurs, Pulse can partially bond with Prisca's vehicle parts due to her small size.
- Velox - A large armored Pteranodon who becomes Joon's partner. Its armor contains blades on the top part of its wings.

=== Supporting characters ===
- Lt. Col. Jessalyn Helmsworth (portrayed by Yvonne Chapman) - A military member who is behind the Armorsaurs Initiative and becomes the Armorsaur pilots' mentor.
- Dr. Chandler (portrayed by Andrew Russell) - The field operations leader for the human forces who comes up with different inventions to help out in missions. In "Brother in Armorsaurs", Chandler is revealed to be an alien of the same species as Karter Klay.
- Su Park (portrayed by Jin Kwon Song) - Joon's older brother and expert Taekwondo fighter who originally owned Cobalt that T.J. later bonded with. He was previously attacked by the Chromedrones and hospitalized during a mission to reclaim Ajax. Kater Klay later turned him into a humanoid Chromedrone.
- Kex (portrayed by Carson Allen) - A member of the Armorsaurs Initiative and leader of Armorsaurs Team Six who wears an eyepatch over her left eye, which was injured during a failed attempt to bond with a dinosaur. She is a friend of Joon and Su. Like the other members of her team, Kex rides an armored Triceratops.
- Rexley - A half-armored baby Tyrannosaurus.

=== Villains ===
- Karter Klay (voiced by Michael Dorn) - The leader of the alien invasion force. He intends to deterraform Earth so that only dinosaurs will survive.
- Johnny / Switchblade (portrayed by Julien Kang) - A mercenary working for the alien invasion force. Johnny was originally a part of the Armorsaurs Initiative and a first generation pilot in Armorsaurs Team Six until he was abducted in an ambush and forced to serve Karter Klay.
- Venom Walkers - Small quadrupedal robotic minions who can scale walls.
- Exo-Drones - Large bipedal robotic minions with heavy artillery.
- KV1N - An extraterrestrial mech-human hybrid. It was killed by Johnny and Joon, with its remains being brought back to the Armorsaurs Initiative. Johnny refers to KV1N as a humanoid Chromedrone.

==== Chromedrone War Beasts ====
The Chromedrone War Beasts are robotic animal-like minions of the alien invasion force. They were created by combining the DNA of Earth's lifeforms with alien technology. (Note: The Chromedrones are adapted from Armored Saurus where they were known as the Mechanical Dinosaur Empire.)

- Velociraptor Chromedrones - Velociraptor-type Chromedrones.
- Crocodile Chromedrones - Crocodile-type Chromedrones.
- Mosasaurus Chromedrone - A Mosasaurus-type Chromedrone.
- Mountain Gorilla Chromedrones - Mountain gorilla-type Chromedrones.
- Pteranodon Chromedrones - Pteranodon-type Chromedrones.
- Smilodon Chromedrone - A Smilodon-type Chromedrone.
- Mammoth Chromedrones - Two mammoth-type Chromedrones who guard Karter Klay's lair.
- The Ultimate Chromedrone is an unnamed chimeric Chromedrone with a dragon-like appearance. It has the head and wings of a Pteranodon Chromedrone, the forelimbs of a Velociraptor Chromedrone, the body of a Mountain Gorilla Chromedrone, the back spines of a Mammoth Chromedrone, the hind legs of a Smilodon Chromedrone, and the tail of a Crocodile Cromedrone. The Ultimate Chromedrone is destroyed by Switchblade riding his armored Triceratops. (Note: In Armored Saurus, the Ultimate Chromedrone is the second-in-command of the Mechanical Dinosaur Empire and was known as Plautus who was an evolved Megemech Pteranodon.)

== Episodes ==
No.	Title	Written by	Original release date
1	"Here Come the Armorsaurs (Part 1)"	Chuck Austen, Paul McEvoy & Konnie Kwak	October 13, 2025
1,000,000 years ago, an alien force had taken the dinosaurs away. 1,000,000 years later, the dinosaurs have returned. The mercenary Switchblade leads the Velociraptor Chromedrones in trying to target the Tyrannosaurus Ajax. An Armorsaur Pilot named Su Park tries to rescue Ajax with this Triceratops Cobalt, but he ends up injured. His brother Joon is later ambushed in his dojo by Switchblade until the Armorsaurs Initiative operatives led by Kex shows up and save him.
2	"Here Come the Armorsaurs (Part 2)"	Chuck Austen, Paul McEvoy & Konnie Kwak	October 13, 2025
Following what happened to Su, Joon is brought in alongside other teenagers T.J. and the Silva Sisters Paloma and Prisca. They meet with Liam, Lt. Colonel Jessalyn Helmsworth, and Dr. Chandler. Jessalyn and Chandler explains that the teenagers each have the Avian Anomaly that enables them to speak with dinosaurs and also explains why Switchblade is after them. While Joon fails at bonding wit his brother's Triceratops, T.J. is successful at that. The teens become Armorsaur pilots as they begin their mission to rescue Ajax. Despite the difficulty with Switchblade and his minions, they managed to rescue Ajax who bonds with Liam. Switchblade's master Karter Klay is not pleased with the outcome and orders him to capture the Armorsaur pilots.
3	"Sister-Sister"	Chuck Austen	October 20, 2025
Paloma and Prisca's sisterly argument and their bonding with the Velociraptor siblings leads Paloma to hijack a transport with a sentient A.I. for home only to crash in a river and needs rescue from underwater Chromedrones. While the Armorsaurs managed to defeat the Crocodile Chromedrones, they soon take on a Mosasaurus Chromdrone and only managed to short out its programming. Afterwards, Paloma and Prisca fully get to know the Velociraptors Blaze and Pulse. Displeased with what happened to the Mosasaurus Chromedrone, Switchblade orders his men to prepare the Venom Walkers.
4	"Bonded"	Chuck Austen	October 27, 2025
With most of his teammates having bonded with their dinosaurs, Joon has not had any luck. While his teammates go to a canyon and get into a difficult battle with the Venom Walkers and Exo-Drones, Joon is later contacted by Kex who gives the progress on a hospitalized Su. Hearing the advice from Kex on how Cobalt was the one who originally chose Su, Joon goes to the dinosaur habitat to see if any of the dinosaurs will choose him. With Jessalyn right on his trail, she witnesses Joon being chosen by a large Pteranodon named Velex. With Velex armored up, Joon comes to his teammates' aid and helps to defeat the Venom Walkers and the Exo-Drones. Afterwards, Joon has no hard feelings over Cobalt choosing T.J. over him.
5	"Teamwork Makes the Dream Work"	Chuck Austen	November 3, 2025
When Chromedrones modeled after mountain gorillas and Pteranodons attack a transport containing the dinosaur DNA, the Armorsaurs must learn to stick with the plan. After being injured in battle and meeting a baby Tyrannosaurus named Rexley, T.J. learns the meaning of teamwork on and off the basketball court as he directs the team through a challenging mission when it comes to a transport associated with Switchblade that is guarded by a Smilodon-type Chromedrone. The Armorsaur pilots managed to defeat the Smilodon Chromdrone and recover the DNA samples. As the Armorsaur pilots play basketball, Dr. Chandler informs Jessalyn that half of the DNA samples were stolen. Jessalyn then encounters Switchblade, recognizing him as Johnny.
6	"War Games"	Chuck Austen & Paul McEvoy	November 10, 2025
Continuing from the last episode, the Armorsaur pilots find Jessalyn in the hall with Johnny. Joon chases after him for hurting Su. Kex also recognizes Johnny as Switchblade who claims that he has no intention of hurting Joon or Su. After Switchblade gets away, Liam has trouble with Ajax who chases after Rexley and knocks down the solar array that powers the cloaking field. While lucky that the backup generators kicked on, Dr. Chandler assumes that Rexley is the problem and suggests re-atomizing Rexley into an improved state much to the dismay of the pilots. In an argument with Jessalyn and Kex, Chandler preps Armorsaur Team Six led of Kex and consisting of their armored Triceratops to go up against the pilots in a dart-themed game of tag to see who is best handled the mission against the aliens. The contest is fierce as Liam and Ajax were the only one darted. Afterwards, Jessalyn and Chandler argue about the aftermath as Chandler admits that he is not good with feelings. Chandler later tells Liam that he will stay on the team and that Rexley will not be re-atomized as someone needs to care for it. Liam and Chandler work to re-introduce Ajax to Rexley.
7	"Bust the Myth-Ventures"	Melissa Flores, Chuck Austen & Paul McEvoy	November 17, 2025
T.J. starts to work on a social media following. This causes him not to hear the call to suit up as the Armorsaur pilots answer a distress signal in Sector 7. The Armorsaur pilots are led into a trap where they are ambushed by Switchblade and the Venom-Walkers which ends with Switchblade making off with Joon with Velex being wounded. Jessalyn reprimands T.J. for his lack of availability. To make matters worse, she and Dr. Chandler find footage that two vloggers named Jess and Kass who make up the Myth-Ventures were sighted at the scene of the fight as Paloma recognized them as rival vloggers. Unfortunately, the Myth-Ventures are also captured as Switchblade tries to get answers on where Su is as Switchblade claims that Jessalyn knows more than he does. The Armorsaur pilots managed to track Joon to the same warehouse that Ajax was rescued from and head out to rescue him and the Myth-Ventures while contending with the Venom-Walkers and the Velociraptor Chromedrones. Following the rescue with Jess and Kass recognizing Paloma, Jessalyn and Chandler dare them to release the video as they plan to discredit them. Chandler does a discrediting video where he poses as a time-traveling scientist who saves the dinosaurs and the Armorsaur pilots posing as animatronic cavepeople from a meteor. Afterwards, the Armorsaurs get a lot of likes. T.J. deletes his profile as he already has the likes of his friends and the dinosaurs. Joon confronts Helmsworth where he wants to know where Su is.
8	"Choose Your Weapons"	Chuck Austen & Paul McEvoy	November 24, 2025
Prisca has been having a series of nightmares revolving around an icy cave. Dr. Chandler finds that she has no temperature as Paloma notices that Blaze and Pulse are also exhausted. Jessalyn decides to do a new training exercise with the Armorsaur pilots by having them learn how to fight without their dinosaurs by giving them their own weapons. Once they have mastered their weapons, Prisca suffers a dizzy spell as Chandler starts to figure out that what Prisca is going through is connected with the tremors. An earthquake happens which affects Prisca and the dinosaurs enough for them to flee the base. Meanwhile, Karter Klay is displeased with Switchblade's failure and that they have not located Su. While sending Switchblade to find the dinosaurs, he will send something else to find Su while warning Switchblade that the day Switchblade becomes obsolete will be his last day alive. The Armorsaur pilots look for the dinosaurs, but are soon attacked by robotic soldiers. With power back on, Chandler sends the pods to the Armorsaur pilots' locations. The robot grabs Joon's helmet and starts to download information to find Su. The Armorsaurs' dinosaurs show up as Prisca collapses. Chandler runs some tests on Prisca. Jessalyn is proud with the Armorsaur pilots for how they stepped up. She and Chandler note that the robot will return as it was trying to access Joon's mind. Note: This episode ends with a music video to "Eyes" featuring clips from this show.
9	"Terror in the Sky"	Chuck Austen, Melissa Flores & Paul McEvoy	January 19, 2026
Joon encounters Switchblade and learns that Su is at the security hospital Larian Medical Center. This ends up setting off a security perimeter as T.J. and Kex are sent to investigate the coordinates. T.J. and Kex come across Joon with Switchblade as Joon demands to know from Switchblade how he knows Su as a Pteranodon Chromedrone is sighted. Switchblade attempts to entice Joon into coming with him to no avail. Jessalyn reprimands Joon for this parley as Joon counters that Jessalyn is hiding information about Su and Switchblade. Jessalyn confines Joon to his quarters until further notice and dismisses everyone else. Joon is later visited by Kex, who decide that they need to get some answers, only for Jessalyn to initiate a lockdown as a perimeter group is dispatched. They get through as Jessalyn finds out where Joon and Kex are going. At Larian Medical Center, Joon finds Switchblade attacked by KV1N, the same robot that attacked Joon, as Su's body is gone. He and Switchblade fight KV1N and manage to defeat it. Later that night, Kex tells Jessalyn about the robot fight as Dr. Chandler analyzes it. Kex justifies her actions by stating that Jessalyn has not told the Armorsaur pilots who Switchblade really is. Jessalyn caves and informs the Armorsaur pilots that Johnny was a former Armorsaurs Initiative member who worked in Kex's squadron as a first-generation pilot until he left without explanation. Jessalyn states that she should have told them sooner and that they will do everything they can to find Su. When asked about the robot in question, Chandler states that it appears part-extraterrestrial mech and part-human. Its organic parts are dead and it will take a complete examination before they can confirm when the human part died. Johnny is shown to be strapped to a bed in a controlled coma with internal damage.
10	"Father's Day"	Chuck Austen & Paul McEvoy	January 26, 2026
Karter Klay orders his robots to send out more Chromedrones, intending to get one of the Armorsaur pilots for his next plot. A group of Crocodile Chrome Drones fight the Armorsaurs Initiative's tanks outside the Armorsaur Initiative's headquarters. Liam, T.J., Paloma, and Joon are dispatched to fight the Crocodile Chromedrones. Jessalyn assumes that Switchblade has been working for someone as Dr. Chandler clears Prisca to rejoin the Armorsaur pilots. Liam is told by Jessalyn that he did not mess up as he is told that he has a visitor. This visitor is Liam's father Professor Dwayne Roberts, who got a new job in a paleontology expedition and wants Liam to join his paleontology team in the Arctic. Jessalyn and Chandler reluctantly clear Liam to help out his father. Liam later tells Chandler about his father having expectations on him as Chandler gives him a device to contact him. At the Arctic base K-24, Roberts tells Liam that they have discovered some strange technology as Roberts is called to meet with his benefactor. In the Arctic, Liam finds a tank containing a human specimen. He contacts Chandler about what he found and broadcasts it. Prisca senses that a Tyrannosaurus is being dug up in the Arctic. Liam is then confronted by Klay and his robot minions. The rest of the Armorsaur pilots are dispatched to the Arctic. Klay states that his father is not who he wanted and that he wanted Liam due to him being a Tyrannosaurus rider.
11	"Klay's Mission"	Paul McEvoy	February 2, 2026
Continuing from the last episode, Karter Klay has Dwayne Roberts and Liam in his clutches. Near the frozen Tyrannosaurus, Klay explains to Liam and Roberts that his kind came to Earth and abducted dinosaurs to help them in an intergalactic battle. The Chromedrones were created from mixing animals and the aliens' cybernetic technology. However, their enemies adapted and that they need a stronger army. As of right now, the armada of Klay's alien species are on their way to Earth. Meanwhile, the other Armorsaur pilots struggle on the ice against the Mammoth Chromedrones. The ice suddenly breaks and frees the Tyrannosaurus, causing Liam and Roberts to flee. Liam rides off on a snowmobile with one of the robots following him. Later that night, Jessalyn states that Roberts was rescued and taken to the hospital as everyone learns about Klay's plot. Dr. Chandler states that the Armorsaur pilots must go through various training and that the dinosaurs will be given upgrades to help with the traction in the arctic. Jessalyn and Chandler note that Klay will need a pilot for the Tyrannosaurus and that he may force Su to operate it, assuming that Su is still alive. Back in his lair, Klay states to his robots that the figure in the tube will be ready soon. Johnny awakens from his coma as Klay states that he is still working for him.
12	"Confession"	Paul McEvoy	February 9, 2026
Johnny is interrogated by Jessalyn and Kex about why he went to work for Karter Klay. He claims that he worked for Klay to protect the Armorsaur Projects and Jessalyn. During a routine patrol, Johnny was caught by Klay's robots, who stole the Armorsaurs Initiative tech. With the tech gone, Johnny was forced to work for Klay and was eventually transformed into Switchblade. Johnny then stated that he wanted to get Su before KVIN got him because Karter knew that Johnny has been failing him. Johnny calls KV1N a humanoid Chromedrone and figured that Jessalyn withheld the information on Su's location to Joon while also mentioning about Klay knowing about the Avian Anomaly and planning to obtain all five Armorsaur Pilots. After hearing Johnny's side of the story, Jessalyn gets Johnny's proof when Kex finds the missing DNA samples behind an electrical panel. Prisca witnesses a series of earthquakes and sees that Klay is close to raising the giant Tyrannosaurus. Klay states that he is ready for the Armorsaur pilots and that he will soon be unstoppable.
13	"Brother in Armorsaurs"	Paul McEvoy	February 16, 2026
Continuing from the last episode, the Armorsaur Initiative begins its assault on Karter Klay's lair, battling an assortment of Chromedrones and Klay's robots. After most of the Chromedrones are destroyed, Klay unleashes an unspecified Chromedrone with four pairs of wings. A humanoid Chromedrone is unleashed, who hijacks Cobalt, knocks Velox out of the sky, and engages Joon in hand-to-hand combat. Switchblade shows up, riding an armored Triceratops, and helps to defeat the Chromedrone. With the rest of the Chromedrone's defeated, Dr. Chandler informs everyone to target Klay's fuel cell. Just then, Klay abducts Liam to make use of him and the giant Tyrannosaurus to begin his de-terraforming. Chandler then reveals his true alien form and rescues Liam from Klay. On the spaceship, Chandler reveals that he secretly retrieved the fuel cell before destroying it and the spaceship. Liam and Jessalyn later find a log that Chandler had kept detailing what he learned from the humans and hopes that the Armorsaur Pilots would be ready for what happens next.

== Production ==
Announced in October 2023, Armorsaurs was developed as part of a long-term collaboration between MGA Entertainment, MGA Studios and CAKE Entertainment, with distribution handled by Disney Branded Television. The series is directed by Cow and Chicken creator David Feiss and produced by Isaac Larian and Tom van Waveren. Feiss was made aware of the project by writer Konnie Kwak, whom he had previously worked with on YooHoo & Friends. The production blends live-action filming with digital animation, using motion capture and virtual production tools to bring the armored dinosaurs to life. The creators described the show as combining “the energy of a Saturday-morning cartoon with the scale of a live-action adventure. The first season was shot in and around Seoul during the summer of 2024, reusing many of the assets from Armored Saurus, while casting new actors with new storylines.

== Release ==
The series premiered on Disney XD on October 13, 2025, and aired new episodes weekly on Monday nights. The show was added on Disney+ on February 18, 2026.

CAKE Entertainment handles international distribution rights outside of Asia. Daewon Media, the original creator of Armored Saurus, distributes the series in territories including South Korea, China, and Japan.

In the United Kingdom, the series premiered on CBBC and BBC iPlayer on February 18, 2026.

== Reception ==
Armorsaurs received mixed reviews after its premiere on Disney XD in October 2025. Critics and viewers praised the show's visual effects and action sequences, but some felt the story was derivative and compared it to Power Rangers. Common Sense Media recommended the series for children aged nine and up, noting its “cool dinos and vehicles” and “mild fantasy violence.” On Rotten Tomatoes, there are no critic reviews yet, and audience reactions were mixed.
