= Ina Lu =

Ina Lu (Chinese name: 呂怡慧 Lǚ Yíhuì), born 1982 in Taiwan, is a South African Chinese beauty pageant winner from Johannesburg. She was Miss Chinese International 2006.

== Miss Chinese South Africa ==
Ina won the crown of Miss Chinese South Africa 2005, organized by the Chinese community from China, Hong Kong, and Taiwan on January 29, 2005. She beat out 11 other delegates including her sister, Ivy Lu. Ivy was the 1st runner up in Hong Kong for the 2007 title, as the Miss Chinese South Africa pageant is held every two years, but the MCIP is held every year (the top 2 competes).

== Miss Chinese International 2006 ==
She then represented Johannesburg at the Miss Chinese International Pageant 2006. Being considered a favorite due to her figure and smile, she won Johannesburg's first crown. She beat out favorites like Tracy Ip (who did not reach the final 5) of Hong Kong, Crystal Li of Vancouver, and Elva Ni of Toronto for the crown. Before Ina's win, 1995's Miss Chinese South Africa Linda Li was Johannesburg's best showing at Miss Chinese International, placing in the Top 5.

== Post-pageant ==
Instead of taking an offer to join the Hong Kong entertainment industry by signing with TVB, Ina returned to Johannesburg to continue her studies.

== Succession ==
Lu crowned her successor Sarah Song of Sydney, Australia as Miss Chinese International 2007 on January 20, 2007. The first runner up at the pageant was Lu's younger sister Ivy of Johannesburg, South Africa. As a result, both Lus almost became the first sister pair in the history of the pageant to win the crown.

Preceded by Leanne Li 李亞男	Miss Chinese International; 2006	Succeeded by Sarah Song 宋熙年
