= Yvonne Chapman =

Yvonne Chapman may refer to:

- Yvonne Chapman (politician) (born 1940), Australian politician
- Yvonne Chapman (actress) (born 1988), Canadian actress and model
