= Yvonne Chapman (actress) =

Canadian actress

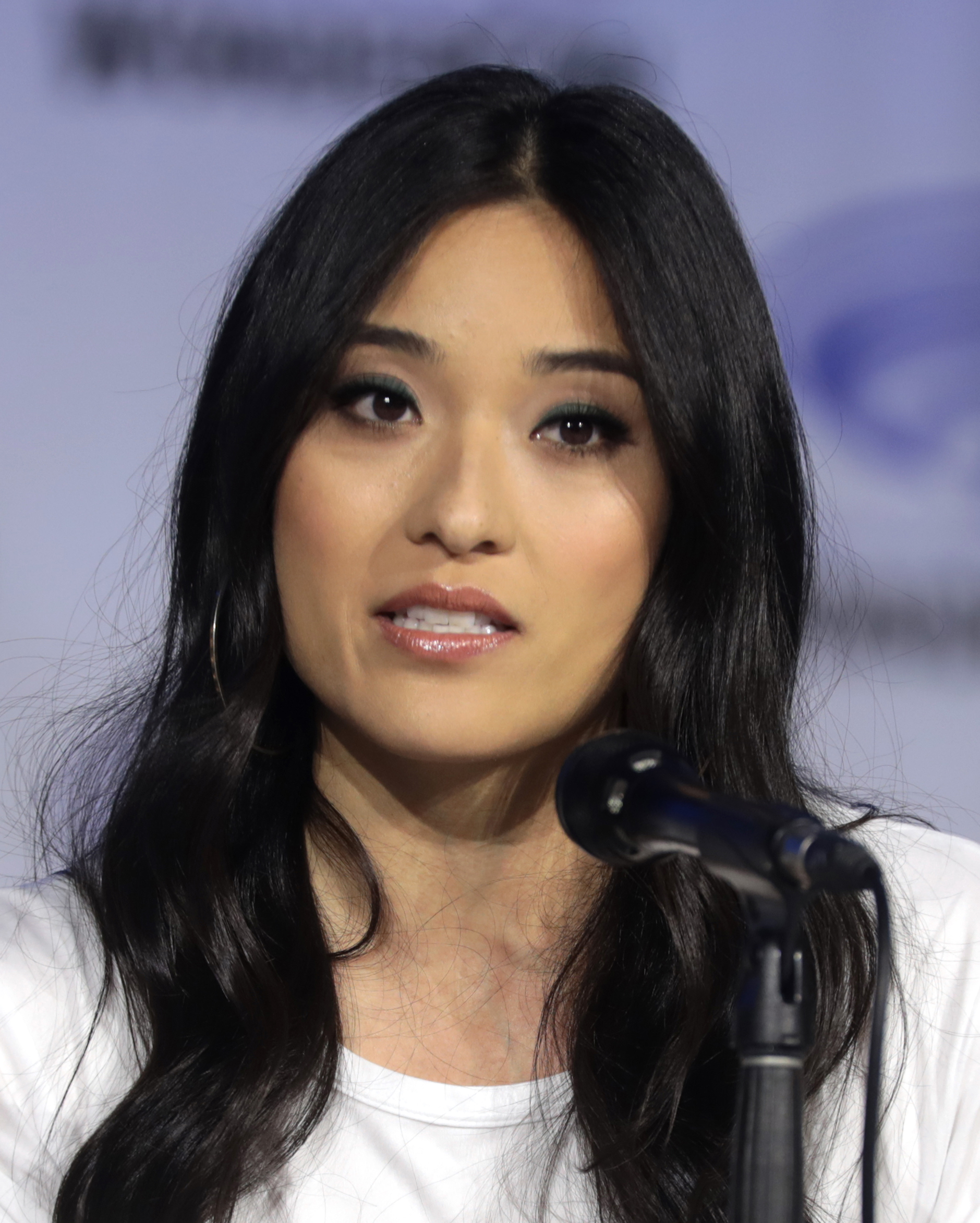
- Chapman at the 2022 WonderCon.
- Born: October 7, 1988 (age 38); Calgary, Alberta, Canada
- Education: University of Calgary
- Occupation: Actress
- Years active: 2015–present

Yvonne Chapman
- Traditional Chinese: 彭美齡
- Simplified Chinese: 彭美龄
Transcriptions
Standard Mandarin
- Hanyu Pinyin: Péng Měilíng
Yue: Cantonese
- Jyutping: Paang4 Mei5 Ling4

Yvonne Chapman (born October 7, 1988) is a Canadian actress and model, known for her role as the villain Zhilan Zhang in The CW's Kung Fu (2021–2023) and Lt. Col. Jessalyn Helmsworth in Armorsaurs (2025–present).

== Early life and education ==
Chapman was born and raised in Calgary to Chinese Canadian parents. She attended high school at Bishop McNally High School and St. Mary's High School, and completed her Bachelor of Commerce at the University of Calgary. She worked as a corporate development analyst before taking a leave of absence to pursue acting in Vancouver.

== Career ==
Chapman began acting in school plays at age 10, and began modelling in her late teens, working between Calgary and Hong Kong. In 2007, she represented Calgary in the Miss Chinese International 2007 Pageant In 2019, Chapman starred in the reboot of CBC's Street Legal (2019). The series was not continued for a second season.

In November 2020, Chapman was cast in a recurring role for Kung Fu (2021–2023), a reboot of the 1972 series of the same name. She was upgraded to series regular status for the second season. In December 2021, Chapman was cast in Netflix's live-action adaptation of Avatar: The Last Airbender, playing the recurring role of Avatar Kyoshi.

== Other ==
In 2023, she collaborated on a YouTube video with Sarah Song (Miss Chinese International 2007 Winner), discussing her acting career as well as reuniting many years after they competed together.

== Filmography ==
=== Film ===
Year	Title	Role	Notes
2018	Darc	Beautician	
TBA	White Lies †	TBA	Post-production

=== Television ===
Year	Title	Role	Notes
2016	Second Chance	Tammy	1 episode
2017	The 100	Pei's Daughter	1 episode
2018	The Crossing	Kate	1 episode
2019	Street Legal	Mina Lee	Recurring role, 6 episodes
2020	Diggstown	Jay Mitchum	1 episode
2021	Family Law	Danielle Lim	Recurring role, 6 episodes
2021	Hudson & Rex	Angel	1 episode
2021–2023	Kung Fu	Zhilan Zhang	Recurring role (season 1); Main role (seasons 2–3), 37 episodes
2024–2026	Avatar: The Last Airbender	Avatar Kyoshi	Recurring role, 5 episodes
2024	Superman & Lois	Amanda McCoy	Recurring role (season 4), 8 episodes
2025	Armorsaurs	Lt. Col. Jessalyn Helmsworth	Main role, 12 episodes
2026	Allegiance	Amy Barnes	1 episode
2026	The Season	Madeline Huang	Main role, 6 episodes
