= The Season =

Hong Kong-American television series

- Promotional poster
- Genre: Thriller; Drama
- Created by: Yalun Tu
- Showrunner: Yalun Tu
- Directed by: Marialy Rivas
- Starring: Jessie Mei Li; Karena Lam; Chris Pang; Justin Chien; Yvonne Chapman; Kōki; Lee Jae-yoon; Lincoln Younes; Claire Lovering; Jai Day; Celina Jade; Toby Stephens
- Music by: Lesley Barber
- Countries of origin: Hong Kong; United States
- Original language: English
- No. of seasons: 1
- No. of episodes: 6

Production
- Executive producers: Chloe Dan; Matt Aragachi; Dylan Tarason; Janice Lee; Agatha Lo; Yalun Tu; Marialy Rivas
- Producers: Xian Li; Aaron Shershow
- Cinematography: Sergio Delgado
- Editors: Sandy Pereira; Christopher A. Smith
- Production companies: PCCW; SK Global

Original release
- Network: Hulu (US); NowTV (HK); Viu (AS, ME, ZA)
- Release: June 17, 2026

The Season is a thriller drama television series created by Yalun Tu, produced by PCCW Media and SK Global Entertainment. The series consists of 6 episodes and it stars Jessie Mei Li, Justin Chien, Yvonne Chapman, Karena Lam, Toby Stephens, Celina Jade, and Chris Pang.

The series premiered all episodes on June 17, 2026, exclusively on Hulu in the U.S., NowTV in Hong Kong and regional based streamer Viu in territories across Asia, Middle East and South Africa.

== Premise ==
Set against the contrasts of Hong Kong, The Season follows a privileged group of friends gathering for a summer of sun-drenched luxury as boating season begins. What starts as a glamorous escape soon spirals into a web of deception, power struggles, and life-altering consequences.

== Cast and characters ==
=== Main ===
- Jessie Mei Li as Coleen "Cola" Pierce, an American who recently arrived in Hong Kong for a summer job with an ulterior motive to seek justice
- Karena Lam as Fiona Hext, Christopher's wife and the queen of Hong Kong high society. Lately, she's been sensing cracks in her manicured world. This summer, Fiona is determined to keep up appearances while protecting her family and legacy.
- Chris Pang as Andrew Fung, Nikita's husband, David's best friend. A sarcastic, sharp-witted, unfiltered hotelier determined to prove his worth this summer.
- Justin Chien as David Ho, Hong Kong's "Most Eligible Bachelor" and Andrew's best friend. A recently divorced handsome and charming lawyer from a prominent family navigating an unfamiliar chapter of his life while hiding a dangerous truth.
- Yvonne Chapman as Madeline Wong, Fiona's niece. She's returned to Hong Kong determined to reclaim her place in society and clear her name of a scandal.
- Kōki as Alison Hext, the poised and effortlessly cool daughter of Fiona and Christopher longing for a sense of connection.
- Lee Jae-yoon as Jon Kim, the Hext family's head of security and trusted 'fixer'
- Lincoln Younes as Matthias Weber, part boxing coach, part gigolo, part drug dealer.
- Claire Lovering as Sara Byford, Jay's wife and one half of an Australian husband-and-wife grifting duo chasing a windfall in Hong Kong
- Jai Day as Jay Byford, Sara's husband and the dreamer of the duo
- Celina Jade as Carrie Shen, Cola's boss, mentor and friend. A fiercely driven, self-made mogul whose confidence masks a deep loneliness.
- Toby Stephens as Christopher Hext, Fiona's husband. A billionaire scion of one of Hong Kong's oldest and most powerful families fighting to protect his fortune, marriage and standing in society.

=== Recurring ===
- Reina Sawai as Nikita Fung, Andrew Fung's wife.
- Xyza Cada as Gloria Reyes, the Hext family's loyal house manager.
- Carl Ng as Benny Li, Cola's father.

=== Cameos ===
- Anson Lo as himself
- Marf Yau as herself
- Thor Lok as himself
- Minnie as herself

== Episodes ==
| No. | Title | Directed by | Written by | Original release date |
|---|---|---|---|---|
| 1 | "The Season" | Marialy Rivas | Yalun Tu | June 17, 2026 |
| 2 | "A Horse Named Alison" | Marialy Rivas | Lana Cho | June 17, 2026 |
| 3 | "A Knock Out Punch" | Marialy Rivas | Tyler Peck | June 17, 2026 |
| 4 | "Murder Most Foul" | Marialy Rivas | Kyle Jarrow | June 17, 2026 |
| 5 | "Ships in the Night" | Marialy Rivas | Eva Hwang & Fallon O'Dowd | June 17, 2026 |
| 6 | "Collision Course" | Marialy Rivas | Yalun Tu | June 17, 2026 |

== Production ==
The Season was filmed entirely on location in Hong Kong, showcasing iconic landmarks like Ocean Park, the Aberdeen Typhoon Shelters, and Sha Tin Racecourse.

== Reception ==
On the review aggregator website Rotten Tomatoes, the series holds an approval rating of 83%, based on 6 reviews, with an average of rated reviews of 5/10. Metacritic, which uses a weighted average, assigned a score of 58 out of 100 based on 4 critics, indicating "mixed or average" reviews.
