= Jessie Mei Li =

English actress

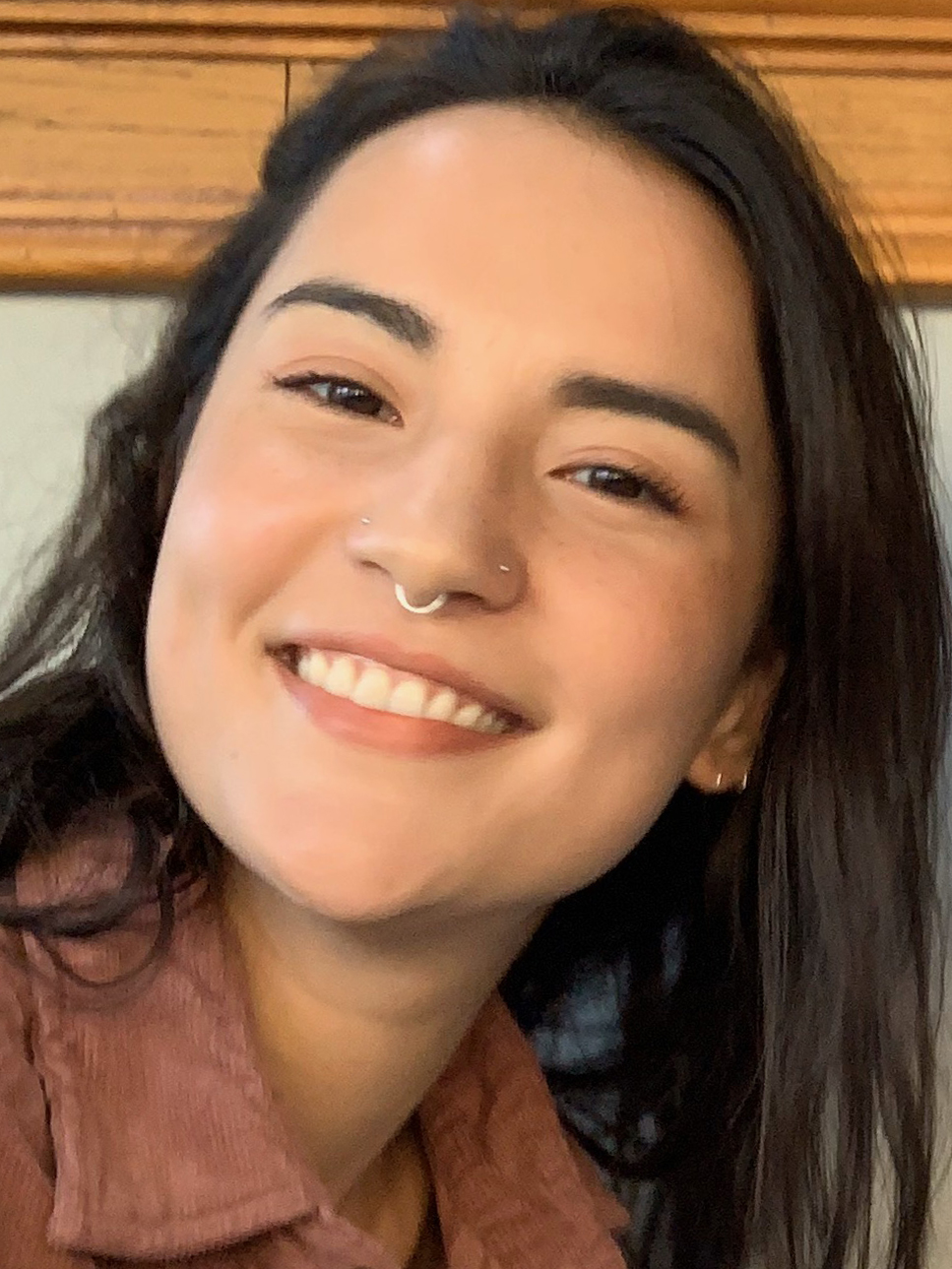
- Jessie Mei Li in 2019
- Born: Jessica Mei Li; 27 August 1995 (age 31); Brighton, East Sussex, England
- Occupation: Actress
- Years active: 2018–present

Jessica Mei Li (born 27 August 1995) is an English actress. On television, she (Note: Li uses the pronouns she/her and they/them. This article uses she/her for consistency.) gained prominence through her role as Alina Starkov in the Netflix fantasy series Shadow and Bone (2021–2023). She has since starred in the Hulu series The Season (2026). Her films include Havoc (2025).

== Early life and education ==
Li was born in Brighton, East Sussex to an English mother and a Chinese father who was raised in Hong Kong. She grew up in Redhill, Surrey and has an older brother. Li attended Reigate College from 2010 to 2012 and began studying French and Spanish at the University of Sussex, but eventually dropped out. For nearly two years, Li worked as a teaching assistant for children with special needs at a secondary school.

Li joined the National Youth Theatre in 2015 and trained part-time at Identity School of Acting from 2016 to 2017.

== Career ==
Li made her professional stage debut in February 2019 playing the role of Claudia Casswell in All About Eve at Noël Coward Theatre, directed and adapted for the stage by Ivo van Hove, alongside Gillian Anderson and Lily James.

In October 2019, it was announced Li would star in the lead role of Alina Starkov in the 2021 Netflix series Shadow and Bone, an adaptation of Leigh Bardugo's Grishaverse fantasy book series Shadow and Bone and Six of Crows. Li initially had reservations about auditioning for the character of Alina Starkov, whose ethnicity was changed from white to mixed race for the show, citing concerns about whether the change was being made due to a diversity quota. However, during the audition process, Li observed that the change in Starkov's ethnicity "wasn't just a diversity box ticker" and "was something to help build the world and to help build her character."

Li appeared as Lara Chung in Edgar Wright's 2021 film Last Night in Soho.

== Personal life ==
Li uses she/her and they/them pronouns, and identifies as gender nonconforming.

Li was diagnosed with ADHD as an adult.

Li has spoken on growing up with a lack of positive East Asian and biracial representation onscreen. Her conflict over her dual heritage was compounded when she began auditioning, where she noticed mixed-race roles would sometimes go to fully East Asian or white actors. In an April 2021 interview, Li emphasised the importance of nuanced portrayals of East Asians in media.

== Filmography ==
=== Film ===
Year	Title	Role	Notes
2018	Together, They Smoke	Rose	Shortflix
2019	All About Eve	Claudia Casswell	National Theatre Live
2019	Travelooper	Kiera	Short film
2021	Last Night in Soho	Lara	
2025	Havoc	Ellie Cheung	Netflix film
2026	Rain Catcher	Yumi	
TBA	Pork Scratchings	Ericka	Short film; upcoming

=== Television ===
Year	Title	Role	Notes
2018	Strangers		1 episode
2019	Locked Up Abroad	Christina Jocko	Docuseries; episode: "Panamania"
2021–2023	Shadow and Bone	Alina Starkov	Main role
2024	The Agency	Rose	2 episodes
2026	The Season	Coleen "Cola" Pierce	Main role

=== Music video appearances ===
Year	Song	Artist	Notes
2018	"A Thousand Ringing Bells"	Uri Sade	
2021	"Three Weeks"	James Humphrys	Starred; co-directed; edited

== Stage ==
Year	Title	Role	Notes
2019	All About Eve	Claudia Casswell	Noël Coward Theatre, London
