= Ethel Crowninshield =

American songwriter

Ethel Crowninshield (1882 – ) was an American children's songwriter. Her 1938 Sing & Play songs were used to teach children to sing until the 1950s and 1960s. The song "The Big Crocodile" is still taught today.

== Works ==
- Mother Goose Songs for Little Ones 1909
- Robert Louis Stevenson Songs, 1910
- The Sing & Play Book first edition, 1938, The Boston Music Company / Clarendon Press Oxford
- "Diddle Diddle Dumpling" 1927
- Stories that Sing, 1944

Individual songs

- "Hoo Hoo" or "Yoo Hoo"
- "The Big Crocodile"
