= YooHoo & Friends (2012 TV series) =

- The main characters from left to right: Father Time and YooHoo (on the top), Lemmee, Pammee, Chewoo, and Roodee (on the bottom).
- Genre: Adventure; Surreal comedy; Self-referential humor
- Created by: David Feiss
- Based on: YooHoo & Friends by Aurora World
- Written by: Tom Krajewski; David Feiss ("The YooHoos Meet Father Time")
- Directed by: David Feiss (Note: Original Korean episodes directed by Kyungjun Choi)
- Voices of: Flavor Flav; Jillian Michaels; Paul Dobson; Alistair Abell; Jan Bos; Michelle Brezinski; Jesse Inocalla
- Theme music composer: Rich Dickerson; Gigi Meroni
- Composers: Rich Dickerson; Gigi Meroni
- Countries of origin: United States; Canada
- Original language: English
- No. of seasons: 1
- No. of episodes: 26 (52 segments)

Production
- Executive producers: David Feiss; Konnie Kwak
- Producer: Christine Danzo
- Editor: Kevin Yi
- Running time: 20 minutes
- Production company: Toonzone Studios

Original release
- Network: Cartoon Network (Latin America); ABC (Australia); Pop (UK)
- Release: January 8 – August 20, 2012

Related
- YooHoo & Friends (2009 TV series); YooHoo to the Rescue

YooHoo & Friends is an American-Canadian animated series produced by Toonzone Studios, and is loosely based on the toyline of the same name by Aurora World. Created by David Feiss, known for his work on Cow and Chicken, the series both serves as a gag dub and retelling of the original 2009 South Korean preschool animated series based on the YooHoo & Friends toyline, with comedic and satirical changes being made in order for western audiences to relate to the series more, also being aimed for older children.

The series follows a group of corrupt corporate executives who were turned into the eponymous animal gang by Father Time who are tasked with traveling around the world to fix all of the environmental disasters that they caused. It first premiered on Cartoon Network in Latin America on January 8, 2012, airing in Spanish and Portuguese; it would air in its original English-language on Pop in the UK and on ABC in Australia in the same year.

== Plot ==
YooHoo & Friends is about five human executives who once worked for a fictional corporation called Nasty Corp. When Mother Nature notices that they've been slowly destroying the earth through water, air, and land pollution, she pressures Father Time to stop them from completely destroying the Earth by turning them into five animals with big eyes and long, furry tails. Together, Lemmee the sourpuss ring-tailed lemur, Roodee the capuchin monkey inventor, Pammee the girly fennec fox, Chewoo the optimistic red squirrel, and YooHoo the leader, a bush baby, save the world from all the environmental disasters they caused as their human selves and help a group of endangered animals in return for the gemstones Father Time planted in the locations they visit. Once all of the gems were found, the Furry 5 are allowed to make a wish to become human again.

Each episode also includes a narration from Father Time as he goes back to certain past time periods and adjusts them.

== Characters ==
=== Main characters ===
- Father Time (voiced by Flavor Flav) a blue ogre-like being of red hair dressed as a viking who controls time and acts as the narrator of the series, introducing each episode. He gives the Furry 5 the task to fix all the environmental destruction they caused as executives and find gemstones along the way that will allow them to make a wish and become human again.
- Mother Nature (voiced by Jillian Michaels, credited as "Mara Kay") is Father Time's wife. She was hurt and angered by Nasty Corporation's environmental destruction and ordered Father Time to stop them immediately. She loves her husband and always tries to keep him on track with the Furry 5 and their task to find the gemstones.
- YooHoo (voiced by Paul Dobson, credited as "Cedric Themole") – A Senegal bushbaby and the leader of the Furry 5 who guides the others in search for gemstones. He has cream and grey fur, blue eyes and a blue and grey striped tail.
- Lemmee (voiced by Alistair Abell, credited as "Mark Mathison") – A ring-tailed lemur and the sourpuss. He constantly tries to convince the others that he should be the leader instead of YooHoo. He has grey and white fur, yellow eyes, black eye markings and a grey and white striped tail.
- Roodee (voiced by Jan Bos) – A capuchin monkey and the inventor of the group. He has brown fur and yellow eyes.
- Pammee (voiced by Michelle Brezinski) – A fennec fox who is a girly girl and has a connection to nature. She can understand when an animal is hurt or a plant is thirsty. She has white fur, pink eyes and a pink and white striped tail.
- Chewoo (voiced by Michaels) – A red squirrel and the cheerleader of the group. She is always excited and happy, even in the most dangerous of situations. She has red and white fur and pink eyes.

=== Recurring characters ===
- Pookee 1, 2 and 16 (voiced by Abell, Jesse Inocalla and Dobson respectively) – A trio of meerkats who try to steal the Furry 5's gems to make their wish. They have brown fur, green eyes and purple, pink and yellow eye markings and tail tips.
- Santa Claus (voiced by Feiss) – Father Time's next door neighbour and has a friend-enemy relationship with him.
- The Easter Bunny (voiced by Inocalla) – Another friend of Father Time.
- Leper (voiced by Dobson) – A leprechaun who's also friends with Father Time.
- Happy (voiced by Inocalla) – A red panda and a frequent guest companion of YooHoo and friends. He's married to a sea cow named Martha. He has purple and white fur and pink eyes.
- Loonee (voiced by Inocalla) – A delusional snowy owl who wants to be a pop star and constantly sings, despite being tone-deaf.

== Production ==
David Feiss stated in an interview that he was contacted by Konnie Kwak, the president of Toonzone Studios, to make the original YooHoo & Friends series into something he could sell to western television. He then approached it similarly to Woody Allen's What's Up, Tiger Lily?, where "a foreign language film is re-dubbed in English with an entirely different story, it could be funny." He proposed rewriting the dialogue from the original series, and creating 4 minutes of new animation per episode. Feiss has also said that he moved to a house across from Flavor Flav, the voice of Father Time, and after Feiss befriended him, Flav agreed to be on the show. Neon Pumpkin, a South Korean studio that was owned by Toonzone Studios under the name of "Toonzone Korea", animated parts of Feiss' sketches in his signature art style.

According to Kwak, she once saw YooHoo & Friends stuffed toys and thought "they looked pretty cute. The toys had already inspired a 52-episode animated series that aired in South Korea and had received many prestigious awards in that country. But like many Korean properties, it doesn't translate well overseas. So [Toonzone] planned to repurpose the episodes to broaden the market". The team had prepared the adaptation for a 6 to 12-year-old demographic, unlike the original YooHoo & Friends series which was aimed mainly for preschoolers.

On October 14, 2010, Flav narrated a sneak peek of the series for MIPJunior that was uploaded by Toonzone to YouTube. By 2013, the video was privated.

Eventually, the opportunity to fully develop another season for the series was postponed, and the series was prevented from airing in the United States, where it was developed. As well, the original Korean series would receive a faithful English dub which released in 2013, retaining the original canon and properly adapting its script. This redubbing would be distributed among several streaming services in the following years, effectively replacing the 2012 adaptation and serving as the first exposure to the franchise in the United States. Likely a result of these factors, though further details were never publicly disclosed, Toonzone Studios would resort to taking legal action against Aurora World over "contractual copyrights" of the series in October 2013. This soon led Aurora World to break the deal with Toonzone, then licensing its franchise to Lawless Entertainment in June 2014.

Despite the troubled production, YooHoo & Friends is notable for being one of the few animated TV series by Toonzone Studios that saw release before its eventual closure (and the most recognized show among them in retrospect), alongside Action Dad and Guardians of the Power Masks. The studio had other animated series in development that never saw the light of day, including Bigfoot Littlefoot, another show by Feiss produced for the company.

Furthermore, the company which financed the show, Animation Development Company, was caught illegally raising money by conducting unlicensed, unregistered offerings of securities, and giving misleading statements to its investors. As a result, Animation Development Company stopped being included in the show's credits after the 14th episode.

== Episodes ==
No.	Title	Animation directed by	Storyboarded by	Original air date	Australian air date
1	"The YooHoos Meet Father Time"	Yong-Taek Choi	David Feiss	January 8, 2012	February 15, 2012
1	"Hydro Pain"	Yong-Taek Choi	Jurgen Gross	January 8, 2012	February 16, 2012
"The YooHoos Meet Father Time": When Mr. YooHoo and the other executives of Nasty Corporation are turned into animals by Father Time, they have to reunite Baby Bird with her mother. Korean original episode: 1a: Chewoo as a Baby Bird (아기새가 된 츄우) (Airdate: July 7, 2009) "Hydro Pain": The Furry 5 must free the rainbows that were stuffed to a waterfall. Korean original episode: 3a: Across the Victoria Falls (빅토리아 폭포를 건너자) (Airdate: July 21, 2009)
2	"Rookie Monster"	Yong-Taek Choi	Jurgen Gross	January 9, 2012	February 17, 2012
2	"Water You Talkin' About"	Yong-Taek Choi	Jurgen Gross	January 9, 2012	February 20, 2012
"Rookie Monster": Yoohoo and his friends must rebuild a store in the African savannah but they must deal with a scary monster at first who turns out to be less scary than they initially thought. Korean original episode: 4a: Ahh! There's a Monster! (으악! 괴물이 나타났다!) (Airdate: July 28, 2009) "Water You Talkin' About": Yoohoo and his team must restore the water in the desert which is gone thanks to a Sponge Hotel that they created when they were evil corporate executives. Korean original episode: 5b: Meeting the Meerkat Brothers (미어캣 삼형제를 만나다) (Airdate: August 4, 2009)
3	"Sugar Rabies"	Yong-Taek Choi	David Feiss	January 10, 2012	February 21, 2012
3	"Mane Wreck"	Yong-Taek Choi	David Feiss	January 10, 2012	February 22, 2012
"Sugar Rabies": Father Time instructs Yoohoo and friends to fix a forest they watered with sugar water when they were evil causing candy fruits to grow which caused a variety of unexpected and unwanted side effects when consumed. Korean original episode: 1b: Disappeared Yootopia (사라진 그리닛) (Airdate: July 7, 2009) "Mane Wreck": The Yoohoos travel to the African savannah to fix the mane of Lio, a barbary lion, which has turned blue from a tree that dropped berry juice on his head. Korean original episode: 3b: The Lion with Blue Mane (파란머리사자) (Airdate: July 21, 2009)
4	"Gone Wishin'"	Yong-Taek Choi	Bob Camp	January 11, 2012	February 23, 2012
4	"Scare Play"	Yong-Taek Choi	Bob Camp	January 11, 2012	February 24, 2012
"Gone Wishin'": The Yoohoos must return a wishing star they shot down back into the sky and help Happy the Red Panda find his wife. Korean original episode: 7a: Desert Paradise (Part 1) (사막의 낙원을 찾아서! (상)) (Airdate: August 18, 2009) "Scare Play": The Yoohoos have to deal with a scary creature that scared all the creatures away from the forest, but it turns out that only Chewoo was scared of it and only because this entity sold a food that she hated. Korean original episode: 9a: Spooky Vampire Bats (흡혈박쥐는 무서워!) (Airdate: September 1, 2009)
5	"King Frowny Face"	Yong-Taek Choi	Jurgen Gross	January 12, 2012	February 27, 2012
5	"Salt Lick City"	Yong-Taek Choi	Jurgen Gross	January 12, 2012	February 28, 2012
"King Frowny Face": The Yoohoos meet the king of the meerkats who is the boss of the Pookees, a trio of meerkats who want to steal Yoohoos gems in order to become human. Father Time appears and shows them what they'd look like if they were human and they insist they'd rather remain meerkats. They may have bad memories as they try to steal the gems in future episodes for the same reason. Korean original episode: 6a: Nobody Can Stop (미어캣 삼형제는 못 말려!) (Airdate: August 11, 2009) "Salt Lick City": When the Yoohoo team were human, they sold ice lollies made of salt; in doing so, they displaced all the ocean's salt causing it to grow into a large salt pillar. Happy the Red Panda shows up in this episode because his wife needs salt water to live in. She is a seacow. Korean original episode: 6b: The Stolen Encyclopedia (백과사전을 도둑맞았어요!) (Airdate: August 11, 2009)
6	"Hairy Water"	Yong-Taek Choi	David Feiss	January 13, 2012	February 29, 2012
6	"Fruit of the Doom"	Yong-Taek Choi	Jurgen Gross	January 13, 2012	March 1, 2012
"Hairy Water": After clogging up a natural spring located in lemur territory the Furry 5 must work together to unclog it and allow the water to flow once more. Korean original episode: 2a: The Secret of Baobab Trees (바오밥나무의 비밀) (Airdate: July 14, 2009) "Fruit of the Doom": While they were evil executives, the YooHoo team caused acid rain to fall onto a forest, making the fruit contaminated and unsafe to eat. The task for them to complete is to gather up all of the fruit and wash it in fresh water to make it safe to eat again. Korean original episode: 2b: Who Could Get Water First? (누가 빨리 물을 구해올까요?) (Airdate: July 14, 2009)
7	"Gorilla My Dreams"	Yong-Taek Choi	David Feiss	January 15, 2012	March 2, 2012
7	"The Pelican Grief"	Yong-Taek Choi	Jurgen Gross	January 15, 2012	March 5, 2012
"Gorilla My Dreams": During their flight over the jungle as evil executives, the team got food stuck in their teeth and removed the food with porcupine quills which they then discarded out of the plane window, only for the sharp objects to end up embedded into the feet of a gorilla. Korean original episode: 4b: Finding YooHoo! (유후를 찾아라!) (Airdate: July 28, 2009) "The Pelican Grief": While they were evil executives, the YooHoo and friends team sold bottled water containing pucker powder which made the drinker even thirstier than they were already. A pelican happened to drink some of this water and their bill shrivelled up to a tiny size thus preventing them from catching large fish. Korean original episode: 5a: Catch the Green Seed! (그린 씨앗을 잡아라!) (Airdate: August 4, 2009)
8	"Happy Loves Martha"	Yong-Taek Choi	Jurgen Gross	January 16, 2012	March 6, 2012
8	"Mummy Dearest"	Yong-Taek Choi	Jurgen Gross	January 16, 2012	March 7, 2012
"Happy Loves Martha": When they ran Nasty Corp., YooHoo and friends drained a desert oasis to make instant water. They need to return the water and Happy has a map showing the location of the oasis. When they arrive it is completely dried up but thanks to the meerkat brothers digging into buried explosives accidentally they end up freeing the water. It initially tastes foul but Roodee manages to construct a water filtration device. His wife returns to him after the water supply is restored. Korean original episode: 7b: Desert Paradise (Part 2) (사막의 낙원을 찾아서! (하)) (Airdate: August 18, 2009) "Mummy Dearest": Back when they ran Nasty Corp., the Furry 5 sold radioactive waste as glow-in-the-dark toothpaste which made people's teeth fall out after brushing with it. After the failed product bombed, they dumped it into an Egyptian pyramid while evicting the resident mummies and locking them inside a metal safe. They all end up in the central chamber and they each have to solve a puzzle to reveal the exit. Unlocking the exit also freed the mummies who angrily chased them after Yoohoo apologized for locking them up in the first place. Korean original episode: 8a: The Mysterious Pyramid (피라미드의 수수께끼) (Airdate: August 25, 2009)
9	"Radioactive Bird Jewelry!"	Yong-Taek Choi	Bob Camp	January 17, 2012	March 8, 2012
9	"Handsome Is My Maiden Name"	Yong-Taek Choi	Bob Camp	January 17, 2012	March 9, 2012
"Radioactive Bird Jewelry": As evil executives, YooHoo and friends ended up with solid radioactive waste that looked like shiny gemstones. They sold them to birds under the guise of jewels but they were too heavy for the birds to wear so they all dumped them into a lake. It's now up to the Furry 5 to find and remove all of those dangerous stones, while also seeking Father Time's gem. Korean original episode: 9b: Green Seed in the Lake (씨앗이 호수에 빠졌어요) (Airdate: September 1, 2009) "Handsome Is My Maiden Name": Father Time gives another mission to the five which is to return animal skins that were removed from animals while they were alive with the help of a charismatic Iberian lynx named Libby. He charms both Pammee and Chewoo much to the ire of Roodee, Lemmee and Yoohoo. The girls are furious when Father Time accidentally reveals that Libby is happily married. Korean original episode: 10b: Libbee the Dandy (멋쟁이 스라소니) (Airdate: September 8, 2009)
10	"Let's Talk Turkey"	Kenneth Chu	Bob Camp	January 18, 2012	March 12, 2012
10	"Loonee Sings the Blues"	Kenneth Chu	Bob Camp	January 18, 2012	March 13, 2012
"Let's Talk Turkey": The five must travel to Turkey to recover the fairy chimneys that they shot at the moon, thinking it was made of cheese but wasn't. The fairies try to make it harder for Yoohoo and his pals to reach their home, not realising that they are trying to help. They retrieve the fairy chimneys from the moon and two fairies get married. Korean original episode: 8b: Finding the Fairy Chimneys (요정들의 굴뚝을 찾아서!) (Airdate: August 25, 2009) "Loonee Sings the Blues": Loonee is a snowy owl who was captured by the five when they ran Nasty Corp. They forced Loonee to sing, but didn't realise that he was completely tone-deaf, and as such, sang awfully. After their music failed to sell, they left Loonee trapped in the cave where they used to record him singing. All the time he was alone had caused him to lose his marbles a bit. He assumed he was always singing to a huge live audience even when there was no-one there. Korean original episode: 10a: Rooney the Musician (음악가 루니) (Airdate: September 8, 2009)
11	"The Secret of Stonehenge"	Kenneth Chu	Bob Camp	January 19, 2012	March 14, 2012
11	"Ring Ring the Panda"	Brad Gibson	Bob Camp	January 19, 2012	March 15, 2012
"The Secret of Stonehenge": YooHoo and his friends travel to the Stonehenge in England to locate and retrieve a rainbow stone that they found a long time ago, as it belongs to a group of red squirrels that live there. The stone gives the red squirrels an amazing ability, British accents. Korean original episode: 12a: Look for the Shiny Pebble (반짝이는 돌 조각을 찾아라!) (Airdate: September 22, 2009) "Ring Ring the Panda": Father Time points out to YooHoo and his friends that after removing all the pandas from the salt shaker they were trapped inside, they ended up stuck on a large-scale fly paper which was intended to catch chicken but caught firework rockets instead. Towards the end, Ring Ring becomes smitten for Pammee, the other female in Yoohoo's team. Chewoo is understandably a bit upset about this. Korean original episode: 14b: RingRing the Panda (Part 2) (판다 링링 (하)) (Airdate: October 6, 2009)
12	"The Plastic Grapes of Wrath"	Kenneth Chu	Rufus Leeking	January 22, 2012	March 16, 2012
12	"The Missing Lynx"	Kenneth Chu	Bob Camp	January 22, 2012	March 19, 2012
"The Plastic Grapes of Wrath": When they were still human, YooHoo and his cohort had an intense dislike of insects to the point that they replaced an entire vineyard with plastic grapes. A red fox named Ruby lives there and needs to eat, so she demands that they replace all the fake grapes with real ones. The Pookees are there too and want the gem bag which Ruby picked up after it fell out of Yoohoo's armpit. Korean original episode: 11a: Whose Pouch Is It? (씨앗 주머니는 누구 것일까요?) (Airdate: September 15, 2009) "The Missing Lynx": Libby is looking for his fellow lynxes which are all missing. This time, however, YooHoo and friends aren't responsible. Instead, their distant stone age ancestors were the ones who did this. Their ancestors built an underground town for the Lynxes to live in. Despite all the centuries that have passed, these cave people are still alive. They don't seem to care about the Lynxes being liberated. Korean original episode: 11b: Secrets of the Altamira Cave (알타미라 동굴의 비밀) (Airdate: September 15, 2009)
13	"Mole Berries"	Kenneth Chu	Bob Camp	January 23, 2012	March 20, 2012
13	"Say Freeze"	Kenneth Chu	Bob Camp	January 23, 2012	March 21, 2012
"Mole Berries": As yet another evil product idea, the Nasty Corp. ex-employees used the juice of a berry to create a pill-based medicine that gave people beauty moles. Unfortunately, it was too effective and covered their entire face with moles. Not to mention, it also gave those who consumed it a very bad case of the runs. The Pookees consume them without knowing what they are and are briefly rendered incapacitated. The berries are given to a spotted dog reading society as they want the moles and get a great opportunity to read newspapers when an urgent need to go to the toilet comes up. Korean original episode: 12b: Chewoo Befriends the Youngest Meerkat (막내 미어캣과 친해진 츄우) (Airdate: September 22, 2009) "Say Freeze": Another dumb idea fails when the former Nasty Corp. employees try to sell icy poles in the tropics. Due to the extreme heat, however, the products quickly melted, so they decide to bring a giant iceberg to the tropics while having a huge fan blow air from behind it. The tropics quickly became a sub-zero wasteland where it was too cold to eat anything frozen. One of them passes out from the cold and is revived by what appears to be a snow leopard. It explains that it used to be an attractive hairless cat but had to grow a thick coat when it became too cold. After the five switch off the fan, the animal requests to be completely shaved which they quickly do. Father Time briefly turns Yoohoo and Friends hairless but changes them back practically immediately when they shriek in horror. After being returned to normal, they are very angry with Father Time for what he did to them. Korean original episode: 13b: Over the Altai Mountains (알타이 산맥을 넘다) (Airdate: September 29, 2009)
14	"Squirrel of My Dreams"	Brad Gibson	Jim Smith	January 24, 2012	July 16, 2012
14	"Cry Me a River"	Brad Gibson	Bob Camp	January 24, 2012	July 17, 2012
"Squirrel of My Dreams": Ring Ring the panda wanders the bamboo forests of China and spots Yoohoo and the others. Their mission is to release all the pandas they had trapped inside a huge glass salt shaker after another idiotic product idea. Ring Ring becomes smitten for Chewoo and vows to protect her as well as her friends. He does this by fending off the Pookees who are trying to interfere with Yoohoo and his crew. Korean original episode: 14a: RingRing the Panda (Part 1) (판다 링링 (상)) (Airdate: October 6, 2009) "Cry Me a River": When they ran Nasty Corp., YooHoo and his friends extracted tears from an actual weeping willow that cries 24/7 to make tissues that increased the amount of crying the person did. Unfortunately, Mr Roodee's tear collecting machine malfunctioned and blew up subsequently flooding the whole area. Their mission isn't to drain the flooded area but to make the wildlife happy who have been crying ever since. Roodee fills up the machine with sunflower pollen and it explodes again sending sunflower pollen everywhere and making the animals happy again. The tree is permanently sad, though. The Pookees show up briefly to pretend to befriend Roodee after he abandons his real friends thinking they don't care about him. They double-cross him and steal his book to make a glider to escape with. Roodee gets his revenge by knocking them out of the sky with a catapult loaded with massive boulders. Korean original episode: 15b: Roodee Leaves the Group (루디, 친구들을 떠나다?!) (Airdate: October 20, 2009)
15	"The Tree of Wife"	Brad Gibson	Jim Smith	January 25, 2012	July 17, 2012
15	"Eau de Toilet"	Brad Gibson	Bob Camp	January 25, 2012	July 18, 2012
"The Tree of Wife": When they were corporate executives, YooHoo and his friends chopped down the largest tree in the world to make burgers out of the wood. Mother Nature was very fond of that tree so she instructs Father Time to tell them to fix it. While walking in a forest Pammee falls alsleep on the stump of the tree and when Chewoo accidentally spills water onto the tree it wakes up and instructs the five to plant the seeds of its fruit to make new trees. They grow immediately and Father Time tells them that Elephants used to live in these and as soon as he finishes the sentence elephants start rushing up the trees. It then starts to rain but what is pouring down is not actually rain. The newly grown tree also gets the moon stuck in its upper branches due to its immense height. Korean original episode: 13a: Sleeping Pammee (잠자는 숲 속의 패미) (Airdate: September 29, 2009) "Eau de Toilet": As former evil executives, YooHoo and friends had a product idea to sell perfume made from skunk musk which they obtained by sucking it out of a striped skunk with pink stripes named Sparkee. Their mission is to return the spray to Sparkee as he isn't a real skunk without it. He explains that he resorted to meditation to keep him from going crazy without it. The Pookees try to interfere yet again but are thwarted. After restoring Sparkee to his normal self he promptly knocks all of them unconscious except for Chewoo, who doesn't seem to mind. She asks him how to spray, so he suggests the "stink milking machine" and she demonstrates her new ability in front of Father Time and the other four. They get sent flying out of the cave from the force and pass out from the stench. Chewoo walks out of the cave holding Sparkee's hand, saying to him that this is the beginning of a beautiful friendship. Korean original episode: 15a: The Fake Meditator (인도의 엉터리 명상가를 만나다) (Airdate: October 20, 2009)
16	"Dr. Platypus and the Flying Squirrels"	Brad Gibson	Rufus Leeking	January 26, 2012	July 20, 2012
16	"Worms of Endearment"	Brad Gibson	Rufus Leeking	January 26, 2012	July 23, 2012
"Dr. Platypus and the Flying Squirrels": Back when they ran Nasty Corp., YooHoo and his friends stole all of the Flying Squirrel Fruit in order to make jelly, and made a giant wall to keep the squirrels out, so now they need to find a way to get them back in. Along the way, they meet the titular Dr. Platypus, who offers to help heal Chewoo at the Magic Waterfall of Healing after she injured herself while getting over the wall. Korean original episode: 18b: Another Paradise (또 하나의 파라다이스) (Airdate: November 10, 2009) "Worms of Endearment": When they were executives, YooHoo and friends destroyed land in an attempt to create new national monuments, which separated worms from their families as a result. When they start searching for the gem, Chewoo claims she found it, but it ends up simply being a joke. Eventually, she finds the real gem, but nobody else believes her as they think she is merely joking again. When Chewoo accidentally drops the gem in the Bland Canyon, the Pookies offer to find it in an attempt to steal it. The Pookies try to chase after the gem in the current, but it ends up getting caught on a rock while the Pookies go down the waterfall. Chewoo manages to grab the gem, and takes it to Yoohoo and the rest of his friends, who them make a catapult to get the worms to the other side. Korean original episode: 19b: Two Seeds (두 개의 씨앗) (Airdate: November 17, 2009)
17	"The Nasty Book"	Brad Gibson	Will Finn	October 13, 2012	July 24, 2012
17	"Nasty Rhinoplasty"	Brad Gibson	Bob Camp	October 13, 2012	July 25, 2012
"The Nasty Book": When the Furry 5 were humans, they had a 6th executive named Ms. Booshoo who helped them with their nasty ways using her book titled "The Nasty Book of Nasty Ideas". However, during a flight, the plane started to move erratically due to her weight, causing them to throw her out of the plane and into a forest. The Pookies eventually end up finding her book, which they mistake for Roodee's, thinking it will lead to the gems. Yoohoo and friends must now stop them before they make any nasty inventions. Korean original episode: 16a: Meerkat, the Great Inventor (발명왕 미어캣) (Airdate: October 27, 2009) "Nasty Rhinoplasty": Korean original episode: 16b: Babysitting Time! (아기 보기는 힘들어!) (Airdate: October 27, 2009)
18	"The Return of Dr. Platypus"	Brad Gibson	Will Finn	October 20, 2012	July 26, 2012
18	"Bloodthirsty the Penguin"	Brad Gibson	Rufus Leeking	October 20, 2012	July 27, 2012
"The Return of Dr. Platypus": Korean original episode: 19a: Secrets of the Paradise (파라다이스의 비밀) (Airdate: November 17, 2009) "Bloodthirsty the Penguin": Korean original episode: 20a: Cookie the South Pole Penguin (남극의 꼬마펭귄 쿠키) (Airdate: November 24, 2009)
19	"The Venus Man-Trap"	Tim Stuby	Will Finn	October 27, 2012	July 30, 2012
19	"Shaolin Monkey"	Tim Stuby	Will Finn	October 27, 2012	July 31, 2012
"The Venus Man-Trap": Korean original episode: 17a: Josh the Chatterbox (수다쟁이 조시를 만나다) (Airdate: November 3, 2009) "Shaolin Monkey": Korean original episode: 18a: Caught by Baboons (눈 원숭이들에게 잡히다!) (Airdate: November 10, 2009)
20	"Cactus Makes Perfect"	Kenneth Chu	Bob Camp	November 3, 2012	August 1, 2012
20	"Nasty Ads"	Kenneth Chu	Bob Camp	November 3, 2012	August 2, 2012
"Cactus Makes Perfect": Korean original episode: 23a: Cactus Desert (선인장 사막) (Airdate: December 15, 2009) "Nasty Ads": Korean original episode: 24a: The Lost Seed Pouch (씨앗주머니를 빼앗기다!) (Airdate: December 22, 2009)
21	"Stoney Island"	Brad Gibson	Bob Camp	November 10, 2012	August 3, 2012
21	"Machu Picchu Macho Taco"	Brad Gibson	Jurgen Gross	November 10, 2012	August 6, 2012
"Stoney Island": Korean original episode: 17b: To Find the Invisible Island (보이지 않는 섬을 찾아서!) (Airdate: November 3, 2009) "Machu Picchu Macho Taco": Korean original episode: 21a: Play Ball in Machu Picchu (마추픽추 공놀이 대회) (Airdate: December 1, 2009)
22	"Bearly News"	Brad Gibson	Jurgen Gross	November 17, 2012	August 7, 2012
22	"Peanut Butter and Jellyfish"	Brad Gibson	Jurgen Gross	November 17, 2012	August 8, 2012
"Bearly News": Korean original episode: 21b: What a Spectacle Bear Needs (눈이 나쁜 안경곰) (Airdate: December 1, 2009) "Peanut Butter and Jellyfish": Korean original episode: 22b: Roodee's Submarine (루디의 잠수함) (Airdate: December 8, 2009)
23	"Boring Stone People"	Kenneth Chu	Rufus Leeking	November 24, 2012	August 9, 2012
23	"Buffalo Blow"	Kenneth Chu	Bob Camp	November 24, 2012	August 10, 2012
"Boring Stone People": Korean original episode: 20b: The Meerkat Conspiracy (미어캣 삼형제의 음모) (Airdate: November 24, 2009) "Buffalo Blow": Korean original episode: 25b: Lemmee, Save Us! (레미, 우리를 구해줘!) (Airdate: December 29, 2009)
24	"Mustache Sauce"	Brad Gibson	Bob Camp	December 1, 2012	August 13, 2012
24	"The Bland Canyon"	Brad Gibson	Bob Camp	December 1, 2012	August 14, 2012
"Mustache Sauce": Korean original episode: 22a: Goodbye Pink Dolphin (안녕, 분홍 돌고래!) (Airdate: December 8, 2009) "The Bland Canyon": Korean original episode: 24b: The Sad Behind Story (미어캣 삼형제, 씨앗주머니를 구하다?!) (Airdate: December 22, 2009)
25	"Beaver Dang"	Brad Gibson	Jurgen Gross	December 8, 2012	August 15, 2012
25	"Frozen Air in a Can"	Brad Gibson	Jurgen Gross	December 8, 2012	August 16, 2012
"Beaver Dang": Korean original episode: 25a: The Beaver Brothers (비버 형제의 댐 쌓기) (Airdate: December 29, 2009) "Frozen Air in a Can": Korean original episode: 26a: To the North Pole (가자, 북극으로!) (Airdate: January 5, 2010)
26	"Pi Hole"	Brad Gibson	Jurgen Gross	December 15, 2012	August 17, 2012
26	"The Wish"	Brad Gibson	Bob Camp	December 15, 2012	August 20, 2012
"Pi Hole": Korean original episode: 23b: Beware! It's Hot! (뜨거워! 조심해!) (Airdate: December 15, 2009) "The Wish": The Furry 5, having collected all the jewels by doing good deeds, finally get their chance to make a wish. Korean original episode: 26b: Back to YooTopia (다시 찾은 그리닛) (Airdate: January 5, 2010)

== Broadcast ==
YooHoo & Friends debuted on Cartoon Network's Movimiento/Movimento Cartoon block in Latin America on January 8, 2012, and later on Boomerang. The second season of the original series also premiered on Boomerang on March 1, 2015, advertised as if it were the same series. The series also premiered on ABC Me in Australia on February 15, 2012, and on Pop in the United Kingdom the same year.

The series' distributor, MoonScoop US, originally planned for the show to air on French and German-speaking territories across Europe, "with hopes to reach televisions in next summer," but this never happened. Despite the series being aimed for a Western audience, and being primarily produced in the United States and Canada, the series notably never aired in either country due to its cancellation.

== Media information ==
A game for the series called "Fling the Furry 5" was released on the now defunct YooHooWorldWide website. Toonzone Studios also planned to release a new line of plush toys, playsets, and light up dolls for the series, although that never happened.
