= Miss Chinese International Pageant 2006 =

- Date: January 21, 2006
- Presenters: Eric Tsang, Sammy Leung, Derek Li
- Entertainment: Justin Lo, Kenny Kwan
- Venue: TVB City, Hong Kong
- Broadcaster: TVB
- Entrants: 17 (with one withdrawal)
- Placements: 5
- Winner: Ina Lu 呂怡慧; Johannesburg, South Africa
- Congeniality: Annabelle Kong 江佩瑩; Kuala Lumpur, Malaysia

The Miss Chinese International Pageant 2006 was held on January 21, 2006 in Hong Kong. The pageant was organized and broadcast by TVB in Hong Kong. At the end of the event, Miss Chinese International 2005 Leanne Li of Vancouver, British Columbia, Canada crowned Ina Lu of Johannesburg, South Africa as the new Miss Chinese International.

== Pageant information ==
The theme to this year's pageant is "Millions of Colours, The Most Beautiful Chinese" 「萬千色彩 最美華裔」. The Masters of Ceremonies include Eric Tsang, Sammy Leung, and Derek Li. Special performing guest were cantopop singers Justin Lo and Kenny Kwan. The delegate from Montréal, (11) Vicki Ng-Wan withdrew from competition. The competition this year marked the lowest contestant turnout until 2013, with only 17 delegates competing, including one who withdrew from competition. The 2016 pageant currently has the lowest contestant count with 14.

The promotional advertisement for this pageant, entitled "Eternal Beauty" (絕色篇) starring Fala Chen won the Best Promotional Clip Award at the TVB Anniversary Awards 2006.

== Results ==
Placement	Contestant	City Represented	Country Represented
Miss Chinese International 2006	Ina Lu 呂怡慧	Johannesburg	South Africa
1st Runner-Up	Ginney Kanchanawat 許裕娟	Bangkok	Thailand
2nd Runner-Up	Annabelle Kong 江佩瑩	Kuala Lumpur	Malaysia
Top 5 Finalists	Crystal Li 李培禎; Elva Ni 倪晨曦	Vancouver; Toronto	Canada; Canada

=== Special awards ===
- Miss Friendship: Annabelle Kong 江佩瑩 (Kuala Lumpur)
- Miss Young: Ginney Kanchanawat 許裕娟 (Bangkok)

== Contestant list ==
No.	Contestant Name	Represented City	Represented Country	Age	Chinese Origin
1	Crystal LI 李培禎	Vancouver	Canada	24	Shandong
2	Fiona CHE 車瀠霏	Sydney	Australia	18	Shanghai
3	Nicole WANG 王倩	New York City	USA	22	Beijing
4	Lillian CHAN 陳麗安	Chicago	USA	23	Guangdong
5	Amy NG 吳星薇	Seattle	USA	22	Guangdong
6	Tanida (Ginney) KANCHANAWAT 許裕娟	Bangkok	Thailand	21	Chaozhou
7	Ina LU 呂怡慧	Johannesburg	South Africa	24	Taiwan
8	Sherry CHEONG 鍾婷婷	Singapore	Singapore	23	Fujian
9	Annabelle KONG 江佩瑩	Kuala Lumpur	Malaysia	20	Hakka
10	Sasha LIN 林羿汎	Taipei	Chinese Taipei	20	Taiwan
11*	Vicki NG-WAN 吳慧琪	Montréal	Canada	17	Hakka
12	Elva NI 倪晨曦	Toronto	Canada	18	Suzhou
13	Melody WU CHUJOY 胡家儀	Lima	Peru	24	Panyu
14	Elizabeth WANG 王蓓藝	Melbourne	Australia	18	Shanghai
15	Yvette CHEONG 張麗雲	Tahiti	French Polynesia	21	Guangdong
16	Royce ESTELLA 黃安妮	Manila	Philippines	19	Xiamen
17	Tracy IP 葉翠翠	Hong Kong	Hong Kong	24	Shanghai

* withdrew from competition

== Crossovers ==
Contestants who previously competed or will be competing at other international beauty pageants:

Miss World

- 2005: Hong Kong: Tracy Ip

Miss Earth

- 2005: Taipei, Chinese Taipei: Lin Yi-Fan
  (representing Taiwan)
