= Michael Pollock =

Michael or Mike Pollock may refer to:

- Michael Pollock (Royal Navy officer) (1916–2006), British Admiral of the Fleet and First Sea Lord
- Michael Pollock (tenor) (1921–2003), American operatic tenor, opera director, and voice teacher
- Mike Pollock (rugby league), rugby league footballer who played in the 1910s and 1920s for New Zealand, and Wellington
- Eileen "Mike" Pollock, American television screenwriter and producer
- Mike Pollock (voice actor) (born 1965), American voice actor
- Michael Pollock (politician), member of the Kentucky House of Representatives from the 51st district

== See also ==
- Michael Pollack (born 1939), better known as Michael J. Pollard, American actor
- Michael Pollack (musician) (born 1994), American songwriter, singer, and record producer
- Mike Pollak (born 1985), American footballer for the Indianapolis Colts, and Carolina Panthers
- Mike Polich (born 1952), American ice hockey player
- Michael Pollok, American attorney who is involved with the 99 Percent Declaration movement
