= Sarah Song =

Chinese actress

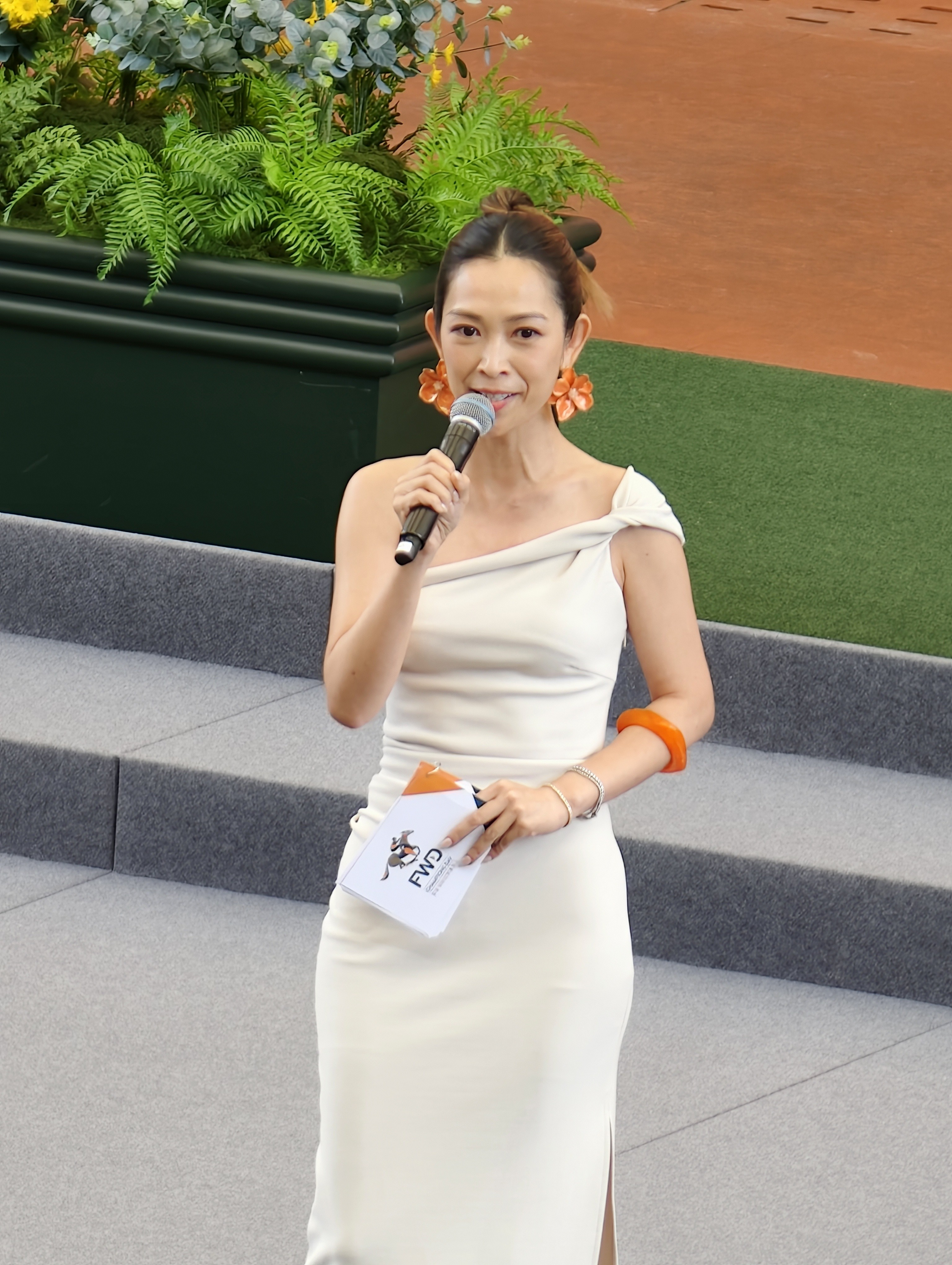
- Song in April 2026
- Born: 9 August 1985 (age 41); Guangzhou, China
- Citizenship: Australia
- Occupations: Actress; television host; MC
- Years active: 2007–present
- Title: Miss Chinese International 2007
- Spouse: Jason Chan Chi-san (m. 2016)
- Children: 2

Chinese name
- Chinese: 宋熙年
Transcriptions
Standard Mandarin
- Hanyu Pinyin: Sòng Xīnían
Yue: Cantonese
- Jyutping: Sung^{6} Hei^{1} Nin^{4}

Sarah Song (Chinese: 宋熙年; born 9 August 1985) is a Chinese-Australian television host, actress, professional MC, and beauty pageant titleholder who was crowned Miss Chinese International 2007. Previously Song was crowned Miss Sydney Chinese 2006.

== Early life ==
Song was born in Guangzhou, China, and immigrated to Sydney, Australia with her parents at age 6. Song attended the all-girls high school, Pymble Ladies' College and graduated in 2003. She attended the University of New South Wales for a Bachelor of Commerce in Services Marketing, but dropped out after winning Miss Chinese International to develop her career in Hong Kong.

== Pageantry ==
Song competed in Miss Sydney Chinese 2006 as No. 1 where she won the crown. After winning Miss Sydney Chinese, she earned the right to represent Sydney at Miss Chinese International 2007, held in Foshan, China. Song won the competition, beating out first runner-up Ivy Lu from Johannesburg, South Africa, and second runner-up Sherry Chen from Toronto, Canada. She also won the Chinese Culture Ambassador Award.

== Career ==
After winning Miss Chinese International, Song signed with broadcasting giant TVB in Hong Kong. She began co-hosting the daily current affairs program The Scoop 東張西望, and the English-language lifestyle program Dolce Vita on TVB Pearl. She has hosted over 30 variety programs for TVB. Song is also a professional MC for corporate and brand marketing events.

After 12 years working at TVB, Song left TVB in September 2019. She and her husband Jason Chan Chi-sun have a YouTube channel with over 130,000 subscribers.

== Filmography ==
Year	Title	Role	Notes
2008	When a Dog Loves a Cat	Cathy	
2009	TVB Food & Travel	Sarah	Australia series; Song and two other hosts visited Tasmania and South Australia.
2010	Twilight Investigation	Tsui Ying	
2010–2011	Links to Temptation	Cherry Dai Mei-yan	
2011	Dropping By Cloud Nine	Katy	TVB mini series
2011	Curse of the Royal Harem		
2012	Daddy Good Deeds	Xiu Mui	
2012	Divas in Distress	Sheung Ying-hung (Youth)	Cameo appearance
2013	Brother's Keeper	Judy	Cameo appearance
2016	Two Steps from Heaven	Bonni	Cameo appearance
2017	My Ages Apart	Bonnie To	
