= David Feiss =

American animator (born 1959)

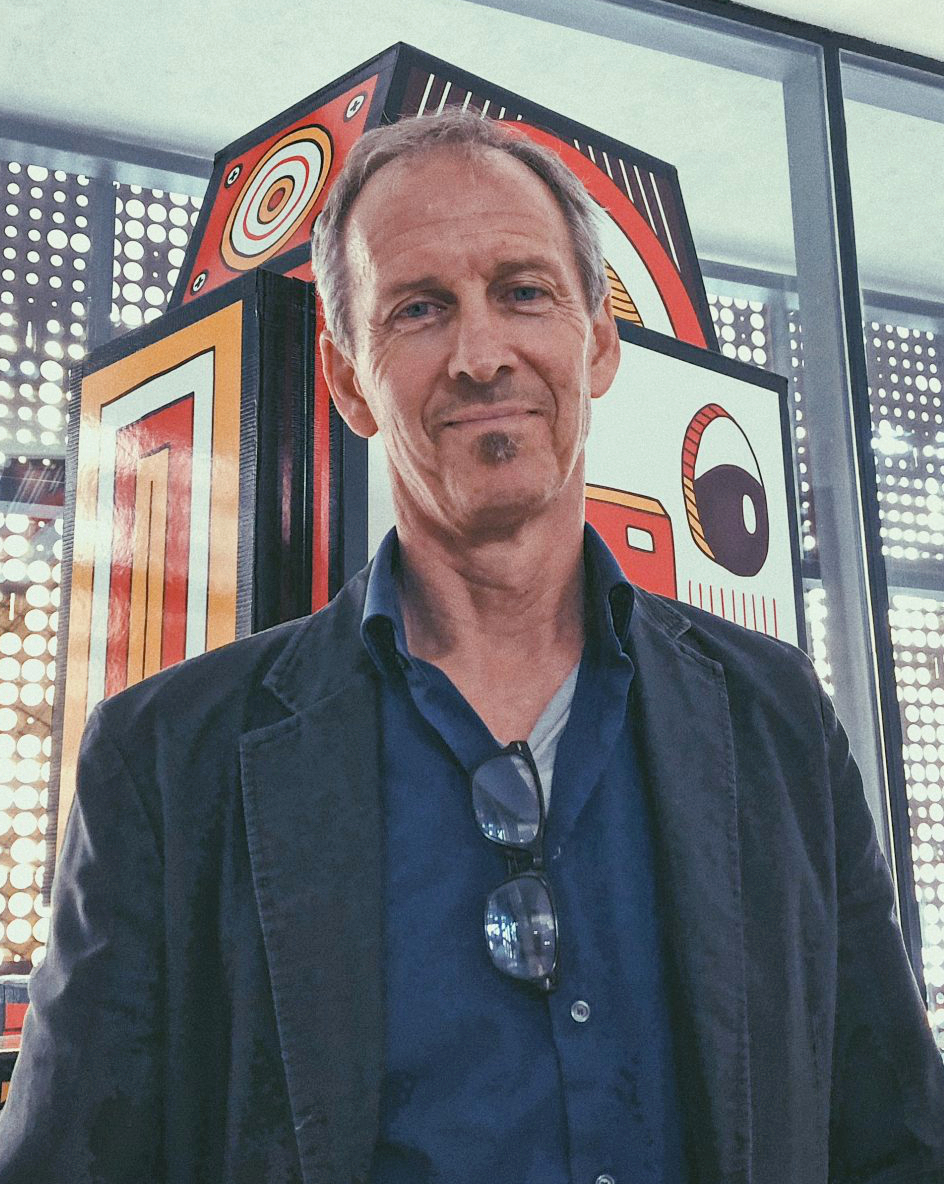
- Feiss in 2018
- Born: April 16, 1959 (age 67); Sacramento, California, U.S.
- Other name: Dave Feiss
- Occupations: Animator; storyboard artist; screenwriter; director
- Years active: 1978–present
- Known for: Cow and Chicken; I Am Weasel; YooHoo & Friends; Armorsaurs
- Spouse(s): Pilar Menendez (m. 1984; div. 2007) Annmarie Ashkar Feiss (m. 2009)
- Relatives: Sam Kieth (cousin)

David Feiss (born April 16, 1959) is an American animator, storyboard artist, screenwriter, and director. He is best known as the creator of the Cartoon Network animated series Cow and Chicken and I Am Weasel. In directing, he is known for directing the episodes of Armorsaurs.

== Career ==
Feiss began his career working for Hanna-Barbera in the late 1970s. He received his first credit for the 1981 adult animated film Heavy Metal. He gained notoriety throughout the late 1980s and 1990s as an animator for Jetsons: The Movie, Once Upon a Forest, The Town Santa Forgot and The Ren & Stimpy Show, The Pink Panther, among others.

In 1995, Cartoon Network, in search of aspiring creators of original programming, launched their animated series What a Cartoon!, which featured a showcase of animated shorts from up-and-coming animators, including Craig McCracken, Genndy Tartakovsky, and Van Partible. Feiss' pilot, "No Smoking", was among the first shorts broadcast on the network and follows the unconventional sibling rivalry between a young cow named Cow and her older brother, a chicken named Chicken, as well as their human parents. The pilot was approved by the network for a full series run, Cow and Chicken, which premiered on July 15, 1997, and ran for four seasons. A spin-off series, I Am Weasel, following the duo of I.M. Weasel and I.R. Baboon, two characters featured in intermediate segments of Cow and Chicken, premiered on June 10, 1999, as a standalone series and ran for one season.

Since Cow and Chicken and I Am Weasel, Feiss has continued to work in the animation industry on projects such as The Grim Adventures of Billy & Mandy, Dave the Barbarian, Open Season, Despicable Me 2, The Grinch, The Willoughbys, Hotel Transylvania: Transformania, Minions: The Rise of Gru, and The SpongeBob Movie: Search for SquarePants.

== Biography ==
David Feiss was born on April 16, 1959, in Sacramento, California. He spent his teenage years making films, and at age 19 in 1978 he animated a short music film of The Beatles' song "Maxwell's Silver Hammer"; this got him a job at Hanna-Barbera while still a teenager after graduating Casa Roble High School.

He worked on the 1980s revival of The Jetsons, where he was acquainted with John Kricfalusi; the duo became friends, and Feiss helped animate "Big House Blues" as a favor. He would then work as an animation director on The Ren & Stimpy Show during its first season. Kricfalusi spoke highly of Feiss's animation skills and talent.

Feiss later returned to Hanna-Barbera and created the Cartoon Network original series Cow and Chicken and its spin-off, I Am Weasel. Feiss stated that The Adventures of Rocky and Bullwinkle and Friends was the primary influence for his work. On his shows, David directed every episode and also worked as a writer, his writing credits usually collaborated with Michael Ryan.

Feiss co-directed the animated segments of The Adventures of Hyperman, a computer game released in 1995 by IBM.

In issues #5 and #30 of his cousin Sam Kieth's comic book The Maxx, David showcased his work with The Crappon (which looks like the Warner Bros. frog mascot Michigan J. Frog), Fred Flower and Uncle Italian Moose, which had a very similar style to Cow and Chicken (they are reprinted in WildStorm's The Maxx Volumes 1 and 5 trades). Feiss also collaborated with Kieth on a story featured in Parody Press's 1992 one-shot comic book Pummeler, spoofing Marvel Comics' famous character The Punisher.

In 2006, he served as the head of story and character designer for Sony Pictures Animation’s first animated film, Open Season and would later direct the fourth film in the series, Open Season: Scared Silly.

== Filmography ==
Year	Title	Role	Notes
1979	C.H.O.M.P.S.		assistant animator: title sequence
1981	Heavy Metal		animator: segment "Taarna"
1982	Heidi's Song		assistant animator
1985	The Body Electric		director
1987	The Chipmunk Adventure		animator
1987	ALF: The Animated Series		animator: opening title sequence
1988	ALF Tales		director/producer (Season 2)
1988	Kissyfur		director/producer (Season 2, with Marek Buchwald)
1988	The Chipmunks		producer
1988	Katy Meets the Aliens		animator
1990	Jetsons: The Movie		key animator
1990	Rockin' Through the Decades		animator
1991	The Ren & Stimpy Show		animation director
1993	A Cool Like That Christmas		director (with Swinton O. Scott III)/storyboard artist
1993	Once Upon a Forest		animator
1993	Droopy, Master Detective		storyboard artist
1993	The Town Santa Forgot		storyboard artist
1993	A Flintstone Family Christmas		storyboard artist
1993–1995	The Pink Panther		storyboard artist
1994	Bobby's World		storyboard artist: 3 episodes
1996	All Dogs Go to Heaven 2		storyboard artist/character designer/directing animator
1997–1999	Cow and Chicken		creator/writer/story/storyboard artist/director
1997–2000	I Am Weasel		creator/story/storyboard artist/director/animation director
2000, 2003	The Grim Adventures of Billy & Mandy		animation layout/storyboard artist: segments "Meet the Reaper" & "Smarten Up!"
2000	Lost Cat		writer/storyboard artist/director/character designer
2002	Poochini's Yard		storyboard artist: segments "The Skunk" & "Queen Bee"
2002	No Prom for Cindy		writer
2004–2005	Dave the Barbarian		main title storyboard artist/storyboard artist: segment "The Way of the Dave"
2006	Open Season		head of story
2007	The ChubbChubbs Save Xmas		writer
2008	El Tigre: The Adventures of Manny Rivera		storyboard artist: segment "The Return of Plata Peligrosa"
2009	Astro Boy	Cowboy Robot	storyboard artist
2011	Rango		storyboard artist
2011	Thriller Night		writer
2011	Gift of the Night Fury		story artist
2012	YooHoo & Friends	Santa Claus	creator, director, executive producer, writer, character designer, storyboard artist
2013	Despicable Me 2		additional story artist
2013	Free Birds		storyboard artist
2014	Super Manny, Earl Scouts, Steve's First Bath, and Attack of the 50 Ft. Gummy Bear		director
2014	The Boxtrolls		additional story artist
2014	Penguins of Madagascar		storyboard artist
2015	Minions		additional story artist
2015	Hotel Transylvania 2		story artist
2015	Open Season: Scared Silly		director
2017	Smurfs: The Lost Village		story artist
2017	Despicable Me 3		additional story artist
2017	The Emoji Movie		story artist (uncredited)
2018	Hotel Transylvania 3: Summer Vacation		storyboard artist
2018	The Grinch		additional story artist
2019	UglyDolls		storyboard artist
2019	The Secret Life of Pets 2		story artist
2019	Santa's Little Helpers		story
2019	Wonder Park		co-director (uncredited)
2020	The Willoughbys		storyboard artist
2022	Hotel Transylvania: Transformania		story artist, end credits animation director and designer
2022	For Gunter's Eyes Only		director (with David Pellé)
2022	Minions: The Rise of Gru		story artist
2024	Despicable Me 4		story artist
2024	Hitpig!		director (with Cinzia Angelini)
2025	The SpongeBob Movie: Search for SquarePants		story artist
2025–present	Armorsaurs		director

== Accolades ==
David Feiss has received an array of critical accolades since his entrance to the animation industry.

Year	Award	Category	Program	Shared with	Result
1988	Daytime Emmy Awards	Outstanding Achievement in Graphics and Title Design	ALF: The Animated Series	Kevin Altieri and Richard Raynis	Nominated
1994	Annie Awards	Best Individual Achievement for Story Contribution in the Field of Animation	A Flintstone Family Christmas	—N/a	Nominated
1996	Primetime Emmy Awards	Outstanding Animated Program (For Programming One Hour or Less)	Cow and Chicken for "No Smoking"	Buzz Potamkin, Larry Huber, Pilar Menendez, Sam Kieth	Nominated
1998	National Cartoonists Society	NCS Division Award	TV Animation	—N/a	Won
1998	Primetime Emmy Awards	Outstanding Animated Program (For Programming One Hour or Less)	Cow and Chicken for "Free Inside/Journey to the Center of Cow"	Davis Doi, Vincent Davis, Steve Marmel, Richard Pursel, Michael Ryan	Nominated
2017	Annie Awards	Outstanding Achievement in Directing in an Animated TV/Broadcast Production	Open Season: Scared Silly	—N/a	Nominated
