= YooHoo & Friends =

South Korean toy franchise

- Other names: 유후와 친구들 (Yuhuwa Chingudeul)
- Type: Stuffed toy
- Company: Aurora World
- Country: South Korea
- Availability: 2006–present
- Official website

YooHoo & Friends is a South Korean line of stuffed toys released by Aurora World around July 2006.

== History ==
Inspired by a bush baby, the first of the YooHoo & Friends toys that were introduced were five and eight-inch plush animals with big button eyes and long, soft tails. The off-white color plush animal bodies featured yellow, pink, purple or turquoise colors, primarily around the eyes and as color rings on a solid grey tail. The company expanded the line beginning in July 2007 to include Valentine's and graduation-themed YooHoos, eventually leading to the launch of Easter, Halloween and Christmas-themed YooHoos. Aurora continues to expand its merchandising and licensed products worldwide. Other merchandise include educational books, umbrellas, apparel, bedding, room decor and accessories for children, as well as stationery and giftware. Except for the keychain toys, YooHoo & Friends plush animals make sounds when squeezed.

=== Ty, Inc. copyright lawsuit ===
Aurora World, Inc. filed a federal copyright lawsuit against competitor Ty Inc., alleging Ty's Beanie Boos infringe on YooHoo & Friends. Among Aurora's claims: Ty is in violation of the Copyright Act, Lanham Act, section 17200 of the California Business and Professions Code; common law misappropriation; and common law unfair competition. Ty contends it did not intend to sell "Cleo" and "Bubblegum" in the United States of America. Ty also advised the court that the company had ceased sending out display racks and sell sheets containing images of "Cleo" and "Bubblegum".

Aurora's court documents include comparisons of YooHoo & Friends characters with "Bubblegum" and "Cleo" Beanie Boos. Through its court filings, Aurora says, "Ty's unlawful imitations of the YooHoo & Friends products and blatant infringement are damaging Aurora, not only by causing actual confusion and likelihood of confusion in the marketplace...but also by diminishing the value of the YooHoo & Friends products by diluting their distinct and unique nature and erroneously associating them with Ty rather than Aurora." A pre-trial was scheduled to begin on December 20, 2010.

== TV series ==
=== 2009 TV series ===
In 2009, Aurora World released the first TV series based on the franchise, aimed at preschoolers. Initially ending in 2010 with one season on KBS2, the series was revived in 2013-2015 with two more seasons on KBS1, introducing a new plotline and antagonists alongside a different art style. It received an English dub around 2014 which is faithful to the series' plot, retaining all of its intended lore.

=== 2012 TV series (David Feiss Gag Dub) ===
In 2012, an American-Canadian gag dub and Westernized retelling of the series, created by David Feiss (of Cow and Chicken fame) and produced by Toonzone Studios was briefly released in Latin America, Australia, and the UK. This adaptation largely changed the plot of the original series, introduced new characters such as Father Time and Mother Nature, and supplied new segments of animation while digitally editing the old animation to match the completely rewritten scripts. This version of the show was intended for an older audience than the original series (6-12 year-olds in specific), however was panned by critics and disowned by Aurora World itself. As such, this version was cancelled after a single season; it has not aired in the US or Canada (where it was produced), and has not been officially distributed elsewhere since.

=== 2019 TV series (Netflix) ===
From 2019 to 2020, a computer-animated reboot series titled YooHoo to the Rescue was released on Netflix, once again retaining the original series' demographic of preschoolers. This incarnation was co-produced by Mondo TV, and ran for three seasons consisting of 52 episodes total.

== Reception ==
The YooHoo & Friends franchise received several awards from several American-Korean and International awards. The toys won the Korea Contents Design Award in 2009 for Touchstone Pictures, received the 2010 Seal of Excellence Award by Creative Child Magazine in the United States and won the Parents' Choice Award. It also ranked 2 in the GiftBeat Survey for Brand Awareness and won the Independent Toy Award in the United Kingdom in 2011. It later got nominated for Best Asian Property in 2013 and won the Tillywig Top Fun award in the US in 2013.
