= List of unproduced Paramount Pictures animated projects =

This is a list of unmade and unreleased animated projects by Paramount Pictures. Some of these projects were, or still are, in development limbo. These also include the co-productions the studio collaborated with in the past (i.e. Fleischer Studios, MTV Animation, Nickelodeon Movies, Nickelodeon Animation Studio, DreamWorks Animation, and Paramount Animation) as well as sequels to their franchises and one-off films.

== 1990s ==
=== 1993 ===
Series	Title	Description
Feature films	Film deal with Nelvana	In the fall of 1993, Canadian animation studio Nelvana signed a multi-year deal to produce five animated feature films in collaboration with Paramount Pictures, with Kathleen Kennedy and Frank Marshall producing; the first two began production the following summer, at a cost of over US$20 million each. Three of the projects were based on books by E. B. White (The Trumpet of the Swan), Clive Barker (The Thief of Always) and Graeme Base (The Sign of the Seahorse); an original production called Mask Vision was also in the works. However, none of the films were produced in this deal. However of the projects, one project based on the book, The Trumpet of the Swan, would end up being produced for TriStar Pictures by Richard Rich in 2001, only for it to be a critical and commercial failure.

=== 1995 ===
Series	Title	Description
Feature film	Elmo Aardvark film adaptation	Shortly after the release of the 1995 Elmo Aardvark album, Will Ryan was approached by Nickelodeon Movies about starring the Elmo character in a feature film. Ryan and writer Phil Lollar developed a film treatment for a mockumentary tracing Elmo's fictional history as a cartoon character, from pre-film origins to the present day some hundred years later. The mockumentary, potentially titled The Elmo Aardvark Story, would feature live-action interviews with figures who would add historical credibility, such as golden-age animator Ward Kimball; these would be interspersed with clips of the Elmo cartoons that had supposedly been produced through the ages, animated in period-appropriate styles. Designer Leslie Cabarga prepared promotional art, while Fayard Nicholas, Joanie Sommers, and "Weird Al" Yankovic were in talks to contribute to the soundtrack. However, negotiations with Nickelodeon administrators became slow-moving, and after a lengthy "development hell" period, the project fell through.

=== 1998 ===
Series	Title	Description
Feature film	Bone	In August 1998, Paramount Pictures and Nickelodeon Movies acquired the rights to produce an animated film adaptation of the Bone comics. Jeff Smith, author of the Bone comics, stated in a 2003 interview that Nickelodeon had insisted on the Bone cousins being voiced by child actors and wanted the film's soundtrack to include pop songs by the likes of N'Sync. Smith's response was that nobody would insert pop songs in the middle of The Lord of the Rings or The Empire Strikes Back and therefore pop songs should not be placed in Bone either. The film was then developed at Warner Bros. under their Warner Animation Group banner instead. However, in 2019, Netflix purchased the rights to turn Bone into an animated series, which was later cancelled in April 2022 during a reorganization of Netflix Animation.
Hey Arnold!	Hey Arnold!: The Jungle Movie	In 1998, Nickelodeon offered Hey Arnold! creator Craig Bartlett a chance to develop two feature-length films based on the series: one as a TV movie or direct-to-video and another slated for a theatrical release. Nickelodeon asked Bartlett to do "the biggest idea he could think of" for the theatrical film. Albie Hecht, who was president of Nickelodeon at the time, suggested to Bartlett about making the theatrical feature as a spiritual sequel/follow-up to the episode "Parents Day", and have Arnold try to solve the mystery of what happened to his parents. Though after successful test screenings of the made-for-TV movie titled Arnold Saves the Neighborhood, it was decided that it would instead be given a theatrical release in 2002, under the title of Hey Arnold!: The Movie to attract the attention of the public. Around this time, Hecht also asked Bartlett to produce a special one-hour 'prequel' episode titled "The Journal" that would serve as a lead-in to the second movie. The episode debuted on November 11, 2002. But due to the disappointing box office results of the first film, Hey Arnold!: The Jungle Movie was cancelled and ended up leaving the original series with an unresolved cliffhanger ending. The project was later revived as a two-hour TV film that debuted on November 24, 2017.

== 2000s ==
=== 2002 ===
Series	Title	Description
Jimmy Neutron: Boy Genius	Jimmy Neutron 2	In February 2002, a sequel for Jimmy Neutron: Boy Genius was reported in development for a summer 2004 release. Producer Albie Hecht reported to The Los Angeles Times that the sequel "would be made on the same budget as the first, but with a new batch of inventions and adventures in Jimmy's town of Retroville." On June 20, 2002, The Hollywood Reporter reported that writer Kate Boutilier had signed a writing deal with Nickelodeon Movies and Paramount Pictures to write a sequel, but it never materialized. The film was cancelled because the writers could not agree on a story and Alcorn later stated in an interview that "once the TV series came out, there was not a lot of incentive to make a movie when fans could simply watch Jimmy Neutron for free at home."
Feature film	Imaginary Friend	In March 2002, it was announced that Nickelodeon Movies would produce Imaginary Friend, a Gary Ross-helmed live-action/animated hybrid about a boy and his imaginary friend who takes him from the real world to an animated fantasy world. Written by Anne Spielberg, the film would’ve reunited Ross and Spielberg after scripting the 1988 Oscar-nominated Big. Would have been produced by Nickelodeon and Ross' Larger Than Life.

=== 2004 ===
Series	Title	Description
Mighty Mouse	Untitled Mighty Mouse animated film adaptation	As early as 2004, Omation Animation Studios and Nickelodeon announced their intention to bring Mighty Mouse (a property held by CBS Corporation) back to the big screen with a CGI feature film with Steve Oedekerk of Omation Animation Studio to produce and direct that was tentatively scheduled to be released sometime in 2013. This film never materialized and the project's fate was unknown until in 2019, when it was confirmed that the project would be revived by Paramount Animation, and that Jon and Erich Hoeber were announced to be the writers for the film, and in November 2024, Ryan Reynolds confirmed he will be co-writing and producing it under his own production company, Maximum Effort.

=== 2006 ===
Series	Title	Description
The Fairly OddParents	Untitled Fairly OddParents animated film	In 2005 or 2006, Butch Hartman considered making a theatrical adaptation of his animated television series The Fairly OddParents after the show's initial cancellation in 2006, to be produced by Nickelodeon Movies and Paramount Pictures. The film was to be animated much like the series as well as previous Nickelodeon fare such as the Rugrats trilogy and The SpongeBob SquarePants Movie, but was scrapped due to a management change at Paramount although the script was already written. Despite this, Hartman expressed interest in releasing the film for DVD someday, and stated that the script could serve for another TV movie of the show. The series ended on July 26, 2017, and Butch Hartman left Nickelodeon in early 2018, seemingly ending any chances of the film happening.
Smurfs	The Smurfs	In 2006, Paramount obtained the film rights to The Smurfs comics by Peyo and were planning to make a film based on the characters with Nickelodeon Movies. It was described to be an "epic-comedic fantasy", like The Lord of the Rings meets The Princess Bride. Early animation footage was leaked on the internet in early 2008. The film never came to be until Sony Pictures Animation bought the rights thus turning it into the 2011 live-action animated film of the same name, followed by a sequel in 2013 and a fully animated film, Smurfs: The Lost Village, in 2017. After the release of The Lost Village, Sony's film rights had ended and in February 2022, it was reported that Lafig S.A. and IMPS, now known as Peyo Company, the owners of the Smurfs brand, had agreed to a partnership with Paramount Animation and Nickelodeon Movies to produce multiple animated Smurfs films, with the first project being a musical. The film ended up becoming the critically panned Smurfs that was released on July 18, 2025, and starring Rihanna.

== 2010s ==
=== 2011 ===
Series	Title	Description
Feature film	The New Kid	Announced on June 2, 2011, Paramount Pictures had acquired the rights to produce an animated film, via Paramount Animation to make this, of the Penny Arcade one-off strip The New Kid which was published on October 29, 2010. The strip was one of three mini-strips which featured a cinematic opening to a larger story left unexplored. The New Kid is about a boy who is moving to a new planet with his family because of his father's career. The script was written by Gary Whitta and would have been produced by Mary Parent and Cale Boyter. At PAX Australia in 2016, during a Q&A session, Holkins revealed that changes at Paramount resulted in the movie rights being returned to Penny Arcade and the project canceled. He did note, however, that Whitta's script was complete and the project could move forward with another production company in the future.
The Adventures of Tintin	The Adventures of Tintin: Prisoners of the Sun	In November 2011, Steven Spielberg announced a sequel to the 2011 film The Adventures of Tintin and was planned to be released sometime in the future. In 2019, there have been little to no info about the film, but Peter Jackson is still involved with the project. As of 2026, Jackson confirmed that the film was still in development, that he would direct it and that he and Fran Walsh were working on the script.

=== 2014 ===
Series	Title	Description
Feature film	Shedd/Fin	In January 2014, it was reported that former Disney and Pixar animator John Kahrs would direct for Paramount Animation an animated film titled Shedd, which was based on an original idea by Adam Goodman.
Ren & Stimpy	Untitled Ren & Stimpy short film	Bob Camp and William Wray revealed in an April 2016 panel discussion that Kricfalusi was developing a new Ren & Stimpy short that would be shown in theaters with the third SpongeBob SquarePants film, and later said that they were "not invited to that party" and would not be involved with the short's production. However, Kricfalusi later denied making such a cartoon on Twitter. Despite this, an animatic of the short that was originally made as a promotion for The SpongeBob Movie: Sponge Out of Water before being cancelled was released as a bonus feature on the Cans Without Labels DVD in May 2019.

=== 2015 ===
Series	Title	Description
Feature film	Giant Monsters Attack Japan	Originally announced in 2006 as a live-action Nickelodeon Movies production from Matt Stone and Trey Parker, the film moved to Paramount Animation in 2015 with a script written by Matt Lieberman.
Feature film	Bodacious	Announced in October 2015 as an animated feature produced by Eddie Murphy based on the infamous bull of the same name.
Feature film	Untitled sci-fi film	Paramount Animation acquired the rights to an untitled sci-fi pitch from screenwriter David Frigerio in October 2015, which was described as "tonally Cars set in space".

=== 2016 ===
Series	Title	Description
Feature film	Untitled Nicktoons film	On January 27, 2016, a crossover film involving various classic Nicktoons characters was reported to be in development. Jared Hess was attached to direct, as well as co-write with his wife Jerusha. The film was said to be similar to Who Framed Roger Rabbit. In a later interview in September 2016, Hess said that the script was complete and submitted for approval. No word on development has been reported since.
Feature film	Ron's Gone Wrong	On October 2017, it was announced that Locksmith Animation was developing an animated project titled Ron's Gone Wrong with DNEG Animation providing animation services for the film (being credited under "Feature Animation by DNEG"). The film was originally expected to be released by Paramount Pictures under its Paramount Animation label. However, the following year, Paramount abandoned the deal with Locksmith when Paramount CEO Brad Grey gets replaced by Jim Gianopulos. On September 2017, Locksmith formed a multi-year production deal with 20th Century Fox, which could distribute their films under their 20th Century Fox Animation label. The film was released on October 22, 2021 by Walt Disney Studios Motion Pictures through their 20th Century Studios banner.
Feature film	The Flamingo Affair	Announced in June 2016 as a co-production with J.J. Abrams through Bad Robot with a script written by Pamela Pettler. The film was described as a comedic Ocean's Eleven–style heist film with animals in Las Vegas.

=== 2017 ===
Series	Title	Description
Wonder Park	Adventures in Wonder Park	Prior to Wonder Park's release, Paramount Animation announced a television series based on the film, titled Adventures in Wonder Park, to debut on Nickelodeon after the film's theatrical release. Although a trailer for the series was attached to the Blu-ray release of the film, and its first season, consisting of 20 episodes, was completed between 2019 and early 2020, there have been no updates from Nickelodeon on the project as of 2023. The animatic of the pilot was later posted online in December 2022.

=== 2018 ===
Series	Title	Description
Feature film	Monument Valley	In August 2018, Paramount Animation and Weed Road, in partnership with Ustwo Games, announced plans to develop a live action/CGI hybrid film based on the indie game Monument Valley, with Patrick Osborne slated to direct. It was anticipated that the film would feature live actors exploring the computer generated settings based on the game. Osborne stated "I’m privileged to be handed the reins to Ida’s mysterious kingdom, to play in her world of impossible architecture where seeing things differently is everything".

=== 2019 ===
Series	Title	Description
Feature film	The Shrinking of Treehorn	As of 2019, an animated film adaptation of the children's book The Shrinking of Treehorn directed by Ron Howard is said to be in development. The animation would be done by Animal Logic and distributed by Paramount Pictures under its Paramount Animation label. By April 9, 2021, the film's release date was scheduled for November 10, 2023. However, on May 16, 2022, it was announced that the film had been acquired by Netflix with Howard's Imagine Entertainment as its production studio.
Feature film	Untitled Spice Girls film	Speaking in January 2019, following the announcement of the Spice Girls reunion tour, Simon Fuller confirmed plans to make an animated sequel to Spice World. On June 13, 2019, it was reported that Paramount Animation president Mireille Soria had greenlit the project, with all five members of the band returning. The project would be produced by Simon Fuller, with Karen McCullah and Kiki Smith writing the screenplay, and would feature both previous and original songs. The film would feature the band as superheroes. There have been no updates on the project since.

== 2020s ==
=== 2020 ===
Series	Title	Description
Feature film	Stray Dogs	In September 2020, Paramount Animation announced an animated adaptation of the 2021 horror comic Stray Dogs by Tony Fleecs and Trish Forstner, described as Silence of the Lambs meets Lady and the Tramp. The adaptation was set to be produced by Gary Dauberman (Annabelle, It) and written by Mark Perez (Game Night). In August 2026, it was revealed that Fleecs confirmed at a convention that the film is not moving forward at Paramount, and would go on to state that getting paid a lot for the film rights was "the only good thing about it."

=== 2025 ===
Series	Title	Description
Feature film	I Eat Poop: A Dung Beetle Story	In June 2025, Paramount Animation announced that they are developing I Eat Poop: A Dung Beetle Story based on the children’s book by Mark Pett, with Maximum Effort producing as well as Benj Pasek & Justin Paul by their production company Ampersand, and Josh Cooley directing. However, after the Skydance merger, it is announced that it is no longer in development.

== See also ==
- List of unproduced Disney animated projects
- List of unproduced DreamWorks Animation projects
- List of unproduced 20th Century Studios animated projects
- List of unproduced Warner Bros. Animation projects
- List of unproduced Sony Pictures Animation projects
- List of unproduced Universal Pictures animated projects
