= List of unproduced Sony Pictures Animation projects =

This is a list of unmade and unreleased animated projects by Sony Pictures Animation. Some of these films were or still are, in development limbo. These also include the co-productions the studio collaborated with in the past (i.e The Kerner Entertainment Company, Aardman Animations, The Jim Henson Company, Lord Miller Productions, Rovio Animation, and Base FX), as well as sequels to their franchises and one-off films.

== 2000s ==
=== 2001 ===
Series	Title	Description
Feature film	Untitled Astro Boy film	Just as early as 2001, long before the animation studio was founded in 2002, there were plans to do an entirely CGI film based on the Japanese manga series. It was going to be produced by Don Murphy, Lisa Henson, and Kristine Belson with a potential release date of 2004, and it would have been a collaboration with both Sony and Jim Henson Productions. Nothing came out eventually, and it would have been the first film for Sony Pictures Animation long before Open Season. Years later, Astro Boy ended up getting a computer-animated film released in 2009, with production done by Hong Kong-based Imagi Animation Studios instead.

=== 2002 ===
Series	Title	Description
Feature film	Untitled Guiley/Schneiderman films	In July 2002, when Sony Pictures Animation opened its doors, screenwriters Derek Guiley and David Schneiderman had pitched two separate untitled animated projects to the studio.

=== 2003 ===
Series	Title	Description
Feature film	Tam Lin	In May 2003, Sony Pictures Animation announced an adaptation of the Scottish fairy tale Tam Lin, with Roger Allers and Brenda Chapman as directors, but one year later, Allers was later moved to co-direct Open Season. Chapman later moved to Pixar to co-direct Brave.
Feature film and television series	The ChubbChubbs!	A feature-length animated film and a television series based on the short The ChubbChubbs! were in development in 2003, at Sony Pictures Animation. That same year in October, Dan Wilson and Dave Gilbreth were hired to write the film's screenplay.

=== 2004 ===
Series	Title	Description
Feature film	Big Nasty	In August 2004, Sony Pictures Animation hired Don. D. Scott to write a computer-animated musical film entitled Big Nasty that involves micro-animals. Additionally, Scott was also producing the film through his production company, The Bridge, along with Sean Bailey. Penney Finkelman Cox and Nate Hopper were attached as producers. In February 2007, Cox left Sony Pictures Animation, but she remained as a producer for the project. Character designer Sylvain Deboissy posted on ArtStation with a description confirming that the project was cancelled.

=== 2005 ===
Series	Title	Description
Feature film	Neanderthals	In October 2005, Jon Favreau was hired to write, direct and produce an animated film based on his original concept that was to take place in pre-historic times. In January 2008, Favreau told MTV News that he was ready to begin work on the project and was optimistic to do motion capture animation tests before the 2007–08 writers' strike. As of 2010, some concept art was shown online.

=== 2008 ===
Series	Title	Description
Feature film	Pooch Café	In January 2008, Pooch Café author Paul Gilligan revealed on his website that Sony Pictures Animation has signed to make a computer-animated feature film based on the Pooch Café strip. Gilligan then wrote several story treatments and screenplay drafts. In October 2011, Kelly Asbury was hired to write the next script draft. In April 2013, on a Twitter Q/A session, Gilligan revealed that the Pooch Cafe film was shelved by a director whom he refused to name.

=== 2009 ===
Series	Title	Description
Feature film	Changelings	In 2009, according to fantasy illustrator Jean-Baptiste Monge, Sony Pictures Animation had asked him to design some creatures for a fantasy animated film. Brian Pimental was set to direct it and the film was going to be about mischievous creatures that lived in a forest and invaded a house in that wood.
Feature film	The Familiars	In June 2009, Sony Pictures Animation acquired the rights to The Familiars. Doug Sweetland was set to direct it and was later joined with Fergal Reilly to co-direct the film, but in 2013, he left to co-direct The Angry Birds Movie. The same year in January, Sweetland later joined Warner Animation Group to ultimately direct Storks.

== 2010s ==
=== 2010 ===
Series	Title	Description
Feature film	Harold and the Purple Crayon	In February 2010, Sony Pictures Animation and Will Smith's Overbrook Entertainment were developing a computer-animated film adaptation of Harold and the Purple Crayon. It would have been produced by Smith and James Lassiter, and written by Josh Klausner. Dallas Clayton was later brought to write the film. The film moved to Columbia Pictures and Davis Entertainment and was released on August 2, 2024.
Feature film	RollerCoaster Tycoon	In 2010, Sony Pictures Animation was developing a film adaptation of the RollerCoaster Tycoon series, with filmmaker Harald Zwart executive producing and possibly directing.
Feature film	Flower Power	According to character designer Sylvain Deboissy, Sony Pictures Animation had an idea for an animated fantasy film set in the 1960s, named Flower Power. On his blog, however, the project is cancelled.
Feature film	Futuropolis	In December 2010, Sony Pictures Animation had entered a four-picture deal with Gotham Group beginning with an animated feature film. Based on his original story, Stephan Franck was attached to direct and David Reynolds was to write the script.
Feature film	Popeye	By March 2010, Sony Pictures Animation was developing a 3D computer-animated Popeye film, with Avi Arad producing it. Jay Scherick and David Ronn, the writers of The Smurfs, were brought to write the screenplay for the film. In June 2012, Genndy Tartakovsky was hired to direct the feature, which he planned to make "as artful and unrealistic as possible". Sony originally scheduled the film for release date of September 26, 2014, but was pushed back to 2015. Sony Pictures Animation later updated its slate, scheduling the film for 2016, and Tartakovsky was hired as the director of Hotel Transylvania 2, which he was directing concurrently with Popeye. Tartakovsky revealed an "animation test" footage in September 2014. Despite the well-received test footage, Tartakovsky left the project, and would instead direct Can You Imagine?, which was based on his own original idea, but it was scrapped. T.J. Fixman was brought to write the film in 2016. In 2020, the project moved at King Features Syndicate, with Tartakovsky returning to helm the film, but in July 2022, Tartakovsky confirmed the project was no longer in development. On July 22, an animatic of the entire film was leaked online, but it wouldn't reach mainstream attention until 4 days later.

=== 2011 ===
Series	Title	Description
Feature film	Untitled Lima/Sussman Project	In 2011, Enchanted director and writer Kevin Lima and David Sussman were hired to produce a live-action/animated project for Sony Pictures Animation. Sussman was to write the film, and Lima to direct and produce the film.
Feature film	Muncle Trogg	In March 2011, Sony Pictures Animation acquired the film rights to Janet Foxley's children's book Muncle Trogg. The story is set in a community of giants who live in a volcano and centers on a tiny giant (which makes him human-sized) laughed at for his size. He ends up saving his family in a story that involves a solar-powered dragon, a disgraced brother and a kidnapped child. Jane Startz was set to executive produce, while Kane Lee was assigned to produce the project.
Feature film	How to Survive a Garden Gnome Attack	In April 2011, Sony Pictures Animation announced their first R-rated project, an adaptation of Chuck Sambuchino's book How to Survive a Garden Gnome Attack: Defend Yourself When the Lawn Warriors Strike (And They Will). It would have been produced by Robert Zemeckis. Chad Damiani and J. P. Lavin were hired as writers in November of the same year.
Feature film	Instant Karma	In April 2011, Sony Pictures Animation picked up the rights to Instant Karma, a comedy fantasy from Paul Hernandez, who wrote the script and was attached to direct what would be a live-action/CGI hybrid film. The film was to follow a misguided safecracker from New Orleans through his life lessons from a near-death experience, only to find himself reincarnated as a fly. He does good deeds to improve his karma, and moves up the food chain through various types of animals, trying to get back to his human body and the woman he loves.
Feature film	Chickenhare	By July 2011, Sony Pictures Animation and Dark Horse Comics were adapting the Chickenhare series into an animated feature film. During 2012 and 2013, Grine revealed on the official Chickenhare Facebook page that he was impressed with screenplays and expressed a hope about the film to be made, but in January 2016, Grine wrote on his Twitter profile that the film was cancelled. The film was brought back in production in February 2021, known as Chickenhare and the Hamster of Darkness, with Ben Stassen and Matthieu Zeller serving as directors and Dave Collard writing the screenplay. It was co-produced by Sony Pictures International Productions and nWave Pictures, and was released on February 16, 2022.
Feature film	The Cat Burglars	Aardman's stop-motion animated heist action-adventure black comedy film directed by Steve Box, about six cat burglars that steal milk, and their plans to pull off 'the great milk float robbery' before some humans neuter them.
The Pirates!	Sequel to The Pirates! In an Adventure with Scientists!	By August 2011, Aardman Animations was working on a sequel idea for The Pirates! In an Adventure with Scientists!, and by June 2012, a story had been prepared, awaiting Sony to back the project. Eventually, Sony decided not to support the project due to insufficient international earnings. According to director Peter Lord, "it got close, but not quite close enough. I was all fired up for doing more. It was such fun to do! We actually have a poster for The Pirates! In an Adventure with Cowboys!. That would have been just great".

=== 2012 ===
Series	Title	Description
Smurfs	The Smurfs 3	By May 2012, just two weeks after production of The Smurfs 2 was announced, Sony Pictures Animation and Columbia Pictures had been already developing a script for The Smurfs 3, with writers Karey Kirkpatrick and Chris Poche. Hank Azaria, who played the live-action Gargamel, said that the third film "might actually deal with the genuine origin of how all these characters ran into each other way back when". In March 2014, Sony announced to reboot the series with a completely computer-animated film, which eventually became Smurfs: The Lost Village, released in April 2017.
Feature film	Untitled Tonka film	In 2012, an animated film based on the Tonka trucks toy line was in development. It was to be produced by Sony Pictures Animation, Hasbro Studios (currently known as Hasbro Entertainment), and Happy Madison Productions, and to be distributed by Columbia Pictures. A script was written by Fred Wolf, and was to be produced by Adam Sandler, Jack Giarraputo, Brian Goldner (CEO and president of Hasbro), and Bennett Schneir (Hasbro's senior vice president and managing director of motion pictures).
Feature film	Kazorn & The Unicorn	In 2012, Kelly Asbury was in the talks with Sony Pictures Animation to make an animated fantasy film titled Kazorn & The Unicorn. It would've followed the adventures of a young man and a unicorn as he seeks to locate a powerful weapon and prove his worth to his true love. Lloyd Taylor was writing the screenplay. Sam Raimi, Josh Donen and Russell Hollander were producing. Troy Quane was joined in to co-direct the film with Asbury.
Feature film	ALF	In May 2012, Paul Fusco was pitching an ALF film. Three months later, Sony Pictures Animation acquired the rights to ALF, to develop the property into a CGI-live action hybrid film. The Smurfs producer Jordan Kerner was to produce the film, along with Tom Patchett and Paul Fusco.
Feature film	Secret Histories	In 2012, John Francis Daley and Jonathan Goldstein were attached to rewrite the script for a live-action/animated film titled Secret Histories, based on the book series by Ari Berk. The previous draft was written by Tom Wheeler.
Feature film	Manimal	By September 2012, Sony Pictures Animation was developing a live-action/CGI film based on Manimal, with series creator Glen A. Larson attached as a producer. By July 2014, Will Ferrell and Adam McKay through their Gary Sanchez Productions, and Jimmy Miller through his Mosaic Media Group were attached to produce the film. Jay Martel and Ian Roberts were hired to write the script.

=== 2013 ===
Series	Title	Description
Feature film	Sonic the Hedgehog	Development for a Sonic film began in the 1990s but did not leave the planning stage until Sony Pictures acquired the film rights in 2013. Jeff Fowler was brought in to direct in 2016. After Sony put the project in turnaround, Paramount Pictures acquired it in 2017. Most of the cast signed on by August 2018. Principal photography took place between September and October that year in Vancouver and on Vancouver Island, with a release date set for November 8, 2019. Following the negative reaction to the first trailer released in April 2019, Paramount delayed the film by three months to redesign Sonic to more resemble his look in the video games.

=== 2014 ===
Series	Title	Description
Feature film	Genndy Tartakovsky's Can You Imagine?	By March 2014, Hotel Transylvania director Genndy Tartakovsky was working on an animated film titled Can You Imagine?. The project was to tell "a fantastic journey through one boy's imagination", but by July 2017, the project was cancelled.
Feature film	Medusa	In June 2014, Lauren Faust was attached to direct an animated comedy feature film titled Medusa, which was based on a pitch from Todd Alcott and Holly Golden. The film was to be a new story about the character of the same name from Greek mythology, in which she sets out on a quest to revert the curse she earned from a jealous goddess. Faust left the project the following year in November.
Feature film	Superbago	In 2014, Sony Pictures Animation was working on a live-action/stop-motion film titled Superbago, with Robot Chicken executive producers John Harvatine and Eric Towner directing, Ellen Goldsmith-Vein, Jared Hess and Eric Robinson producing, and Hess, Ricky Blitt, Hubbel Palmer and Chris Bowman writing the script, which was to center on a pair of superhero wannabes. In 2019, it was confirmed that the film would be turned into a TV series instead.
Feature film	The Super Mario Bros. Movie	In December 2014, information leaked that Sony Pictures made a deal with Nintendo to create an animated film based on the Mario franchise. The project however never went into development. By November 2017, Nintendo teamed up with Universal Pictures and Illumination to make the animated Mario film. The film was released on April 5, 2023.
Feature film	Playmobil: The Movie	An animated feature film based on Playmobil, the film originally involved Bob Persichetti as director and screenwriter. Persichetti initially pitched the film to Sony Pictures Animation. Although Sony tried to buy the pitch, it fell through. He was eventually offered instead to direct the 2018 superhero film Spider-Man: Into the Spider-Verse. The film later moved to Method Animation for a 2019 release.
Feature film	Super Smash Bros.	According to the hacked Sony emails, two emails show that Sony was interested in making a film based on Nintendo's crossover fighting game series of the same name. The email was written by former Sony Pictures Animation president Michelle Raimo Kouyate and was sent to Amy Pascal.
Feature film	Rabbids	In 2014, Ubisoft teamed up with Sony Pictures Animation to potentially make a live-action/animated hybrid film based on Rabbids. However, it never got far into development. The project was eventually moved to Lionsgate, complete with Todd Strauss-Schulson as the director. At the same time, other companies including Ubisoft Film & Television, Mandeville Films, and Stoopid Buddy Stoodios are involved in the project.

=== 2015 ===
Series	Title	Description
Feature film	Crash Bandicoot	Artist Charles Zembillas stated on his blog back in 2015 that there was some chatter about a potential film adaptation of the Crash Bandicoot video game series at Sony Pictures Animation, but nothing has come out since then. In 2023, on Twitter, current series developer Toys for Bob stated that they wouldn't mind a film adaptation of the games in a rather jokey way after the successful release of Illumination's The Super Mario Bros. Movie.

=== 2018 ===
Series	Title	Description
Feature film	Black Knight	In July 2018, it was reported that Genndy Tartakvosky had signed on to direct an original action-adventure film titled Black Knight. Speaking with Collider's Steve Weintraub in late 2024, Tartakovsky revealed that the script was completed and "...we're just starting to take it out to see who wants to make it with Sony." On September 26, 2025, Tartakovsky stated on Instagram "About 6 years ago we started development on a more adult animated action movie, The Black Knight. We developed it for a few years, the studio liked what we were doing but they were unsure if there is an audience that would go see it theatrically. We made a down and dirty test, and still no go." The film's setting "is around the 14th century."

=== 2019 ===
Series	Title	Description
The Boondocks	The Boondocks reboot	At Annecy 2019, Sony Pictures Animation announced to produce a "reimagining" of the television series. A reboot of the series was officially announced in June with McGruder and voice actor John Witherspoon confirmed to be returning from the original series, before his death on October 29 the same year. The reboot was slated to stream on HBO Max in fall 2020 but this was later postponed to 2021 and then again to 2022. The service ordered two seasons, 24 episodes total with a 50-minute special. The complete run of the original 2005 series was also made available on the service. By February 2022, Sony shelved the reboot. One year later, in an interview with Gary Anthony Williams, he revealed that the reason for the reboot's cancellation was that it took too long to make. Williams also revealed he had finished voiceover recordings for eight episodes as Uncle Ruckus before the cancellation.
Feature film	Tao	On June 20, 2019, it was announced that Emily Dean, who was a story artist on The Lego Batman Movie and The Lego Movie 2: The Second Part would make her directorial debut on an original female-driven sci-fi adventure film titled Tao. The film was in early development, with Tonya Kong attached to write. However, on April 18, 2025, Dean revealed on Instagram that the film was paused.

== 2020s ==
=== 2023 ===
Series	Title	Description
Cloudy with a Chance of Meatballs	Planet of the Grapes	Phil Lord revealed via Twitter in September 2023 that there was a script for a third film for the Cloudy with a Chance of Meatballs series of films titled Planet of the Grapes, which is supposed to be a spoof of Planet of the Apes and the aforementioned film, Kingdom of the Planet of the Apes directed by Wes Ball.
Feature Film	Afterworld	The Thai-set fantasy drama directed by Matt Braly about "a young boy who goes on an emotional journey to a fantastical world of Thai spirits where he hopes to have his illness cured" was announced in 2023 with Braly directing and co-writing the script with Rebecca Sugar. Two years later, the project was cancelled with Braly explaining that the studio deemed it "not commercial enough to produce." However, the project was revived independently by the Thai animated studio Monk Studios following public outcry after its cancellation went public in May 2026 to be funded shortly thereafter.

== See also ==
- List of unproduced 20th Century Studios animated projects
- List of unproduced Disney animated projects
- List of unproduced DreamWorks Animation projects
- List of unproduced Universal Pictures animated projects
- List of unproduced Paramount Pictures animated projects
- List of unproduced Warner Bros. Animation projects
