= Frantix =

2005 video game

- European box art
- Developer: Killer Game
- Publishers: NA: Platform Publishing; PAL: Ubisoft
- Platform: PlayStation Portable
- Release: NA: September 19, 2005; UK: December 2, 2005; AU: December 8, 2005
- Genre: Puzzle
- Mode: Single-player

Frantix is a 2005 puzzle video game developed by American studio Killer Game for the PlayStation Portable. It was released in North America by Platform Publishing and PAL territories by Ubisoft. The game contains over 150 levels (most need to be unlocked). The player must race against the clock in order to solve each puzzle. Some levels are tricky and the most obvious path may not be the best route to go. In each level there are obstacles, deadly traps, hazards and creatures which can delay the player from completing the level.

== Features ==
The game includes Sony Pictures Imageworks' animated short film The ChubbChubbs!; the film's central character, Meeper, is unlocked as a playable character early in the game.

== Release ==
The game started development in November 2003. It was eventually released exclusively for PlayStation Portable in North America by Platform Publishing on September 19, 2005. Published in PAL territories by Ubisoft, the game was released in 2005 in continental Europe on December 1, the United Kingdom on December 2, and in Australia on December 8. It was also released in Japan the following year on February 23, 2006.

== Reception ==
Reception

Aggregate scores
Aggregator	Score
GameRankings	59.98%
Metacritic	59/100

Review scores
Publication	Score
Eurogamer	6/10
GameSpot	5.7/10
GameSpy	2/5
GameZone	6.8/10
IGN	6/10
PALGN	6/10

Frantix received mixed reviews from critics. On Metacritic, the game holds a score of 59/100 based on 29 reviews, indicating "mixed or average reviews". On GameRankings, the game holds a score of 59.98% based on 45 reviews.

By the end of 2005, Frantix had sold under 5,000 copies in the United Kingdom.
