= Early Bloomer =

- Poster
- Directed by: Kevin J. Johnson
- Written by: Kevin J. Johnson
- Produced by: Sande Scoredos
- Edited by: Guy T. Wiedmann
- Music by: Mark Mancina
- Production companies: Columbia Pictures; Sony Pictures Imageworks
- Distributed by: Sony Pictures Releasing
- Release date: May 9, 2003 (with Daddy Day Care)
- Running time: 3 minutes
- Country: United States
- Language: English

Early Bloomer is a 2003 American animated short film produced by Sony Pictures Imageworks. It was created and directed by Kevin J. Johnson. It was the studio's second short film after The ChubbChubbs!.

== Plot ==
The 3-minute film is following a tadpole who grows legs before the other tadpoles and is teased for it until the others unexpectedly grow legs too. He unexpectedly grows arms, which marks the end of the film.

== Release ==
Early Bloomer was theatrically released on May 9, 2003 along with Daddy Day Care. On September 23, 2003, the short was also released as special feature on the Daddy Day Care DVD.
