= List of animation studios owned by Sony =

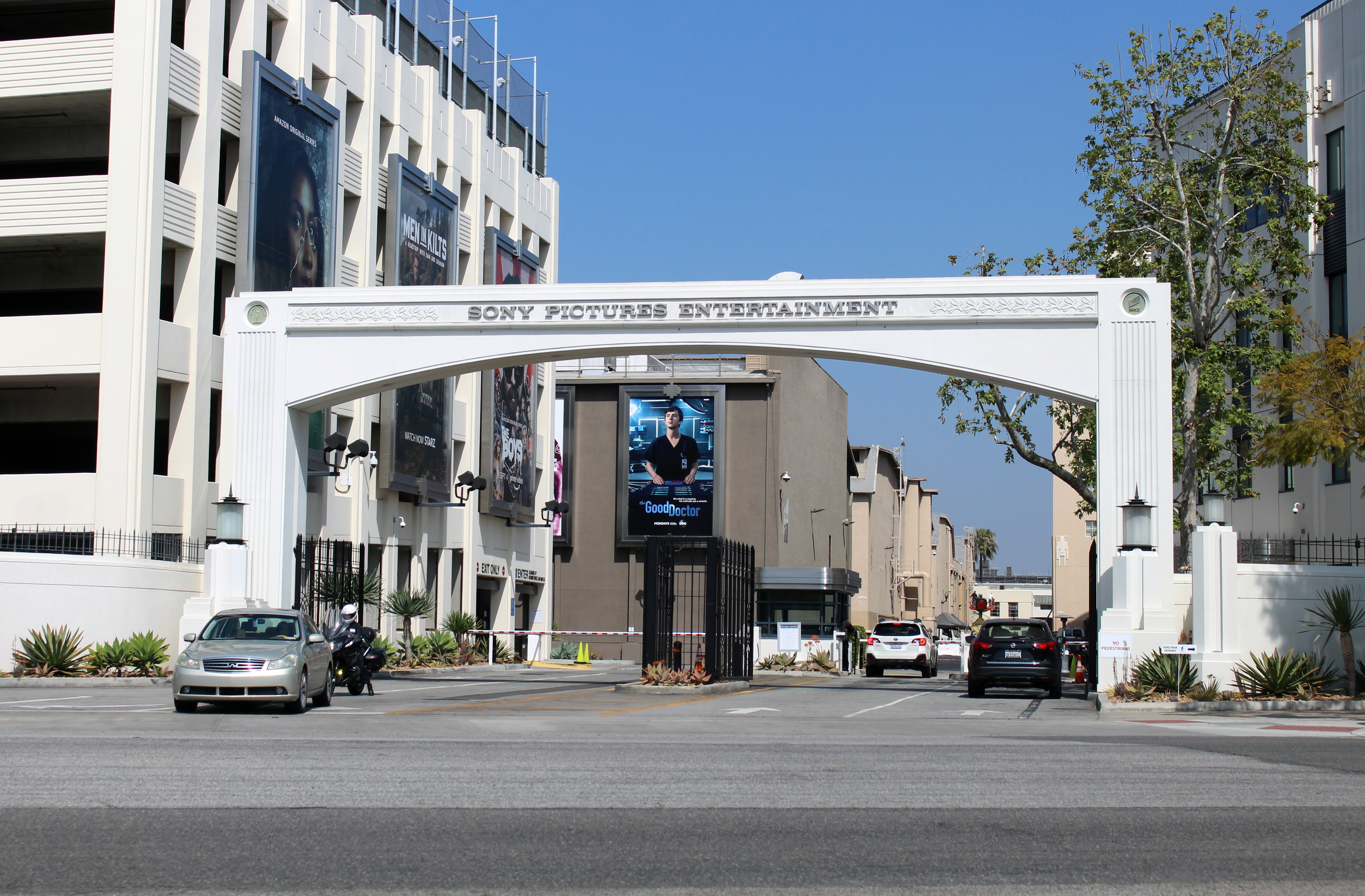
Sony Pictures Entertainment headquarters in Culver City, California

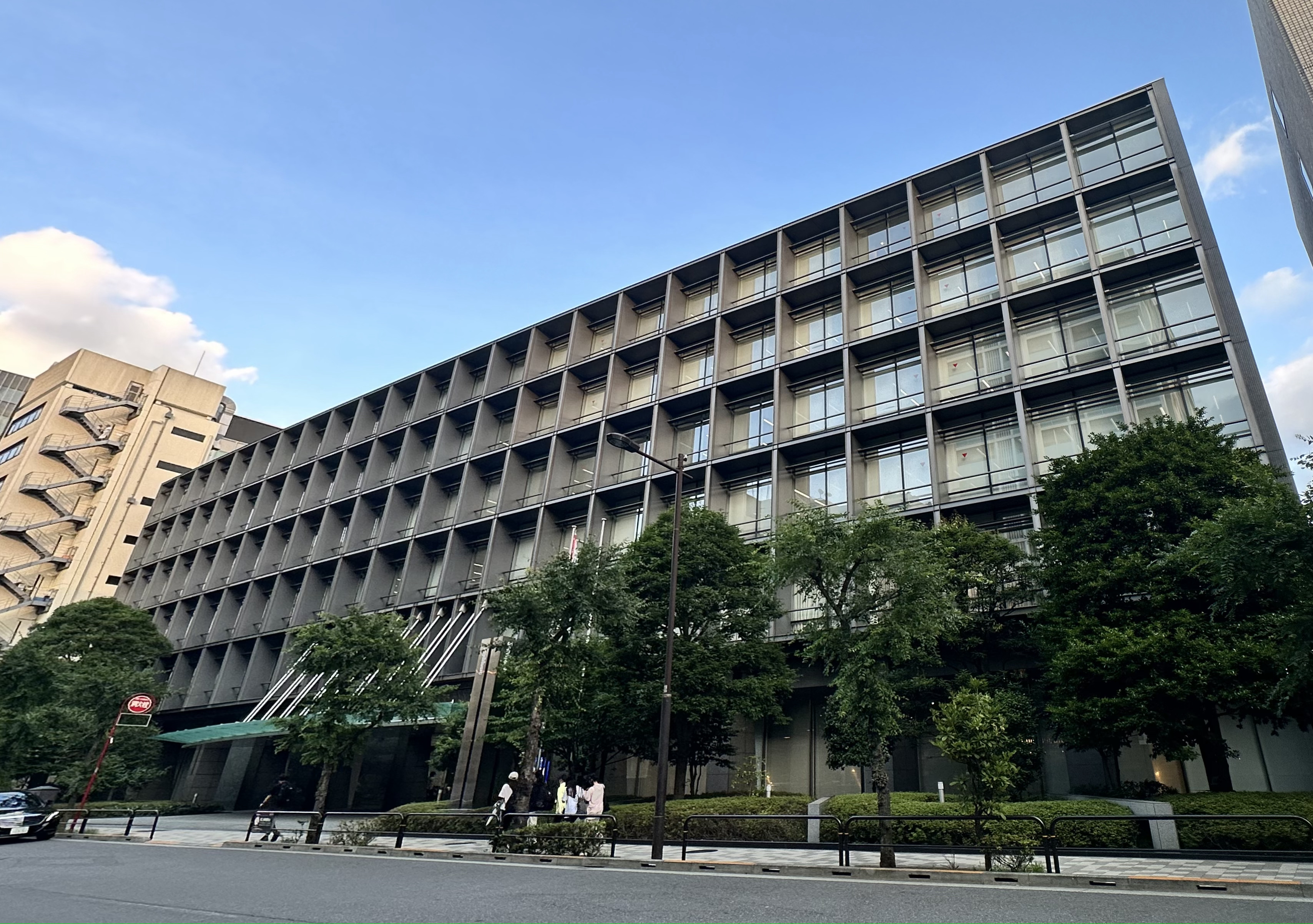
Aniplex's headquarters in Rokubanchō, Chiyoda, Tokyo

Sony has owned several animation studios since the company's founding on May 7, 1946, by Masaru Ibuka and Akio Morita as Tokyo Tsushin Kogyo.

Besides Sony Pictures Animation, which serves as the company's flagship animation studio, Sony also presently operates Sony Pictures Imageworks, Sony Pictures Television Kids, A-1 Pictures and CloverWorks (the latter two through Sony Music Entertainment Japan's Aniplex).

== Full list ==
Current animation studios
Studio	Established	Parent unit
Sony Pictures Animation	2002	Sony Pictures Motion Picture Group
Animation: Feature films, short films and television series in hand-drawn, digital and CGI
Sony Pictures Imageworks	1992	Sony Pictures Motion Picture Group
Animation: Feature films and television series in CGI
Sony Pictures Television Kids	2011	Sony Pictures Television
Animation: Television series, feature films and specials in hand-drawn, digital and CGI; Acquired in 2019. Former names: Silvergate Media (2011–2022)
YAY! Animations	2019	Sony Pictures Networks
Animation: Television series in hand-drawn, digital and CGI.
Pixomondo	2001	Sony Pictures Entertainment
Animation: Feature films and television series in CGI; Acquired in 2022.
Aniplex	1995	Sony Music Entertainment Japan
Animation: Television series and feature films in hand-drawn and CGI; Former names: Sony Pictures Entertainment Music Publishing Inc. (1995–1997), Sony Pictures Entertainment Visual Works Inc. (1997–2001) and Sony Music Entertainment Visual Works Inc. (2001–2003)
A-1 Pictures	2005	Aniplex
Animation: Television series, feature films, OVAs and specials in hand-drawn
Egg Firm	2015	Aniplex
Animation: Television series and feature films in hand-drawn Acquired in 2026.
CloverWorks	2018	Aniplex
Animation: Television series, feature films, OVAs and ONAs in hand-drawn
Boundary	2020	Aniplex
Animation: Television series in CGI
Madhouse, Inc.	1972	Nippon Television Network Corporation (96.06%); Sony Pictures Entertainment Japan (3.94%)
Animation: Feature films, television series and OVAs
Studio Bind (joint venture)	2018	Egg Firm; White Fox
Animation: Television series and OVAs
JOEN (joint venture)	2022	Wit Studio; CloverWorks; Aniplex; Shueisha
Animation: Feature films and television series
ame pippin (joint venture)	2025	Asmik Ace; Aniplex; CoMix Wave Films
Animation: Feature films
Hayate Inc. (joint venture)	2025	Aniplex; Crunchyroll, LLC
Animation: Television series
Lay-duce	2013	Hayate Inc.
Animation: Television series, feature films, OVAs and ONAs

Divested or defunct animation studios
Studio	Established	Status
Toei Animation	1948	1.89% stake sold back to the company
Animation: Television series, feature films, OVAs, ONAs and specials and in hand-drawn, digital and CGI; Former names: Nihon Dōga (1948–1952) and Nichido Eiga (1952–1956)
Adelaide Productions	1993	Dormant
Also known as: Columbia TriStar Television Animation and Sony Pictures Television Animation; Animation: Television series in hand-drawn, digital and CGI
Sony Wonder Television	1995	Sold in 2000
Animation: Television series, feature films and specials in hand-drawn Assets sold to TV-Loonland AG in October 2000, with North American home video and international audio rights retained by Sony.
Sunbow Entertainment	1980	Sold in 2000
Animation: Television series, feature films and specials in hand-drawn Founded in 1980 by Griffin-Bacal Advertising and acquired by Sony Wonder Television in 1998. Sold to TV-Loonland AG in 2000. Former names: Sunbow Productions (1980–1995)
Kartoon Studios	2013	7% stake sold back to the company
Animation: Feature films, television series and specials in hand-drawn, digital and CGI; Former names: Genius Brands International (2013–2023)
Crunchyroll Studios	2018	Closed in 2021
Animation: Television series in hand-drawn Acquired in 2021. Former names: Ellation Studios (2018–2020)

== Sony Pictures Entertainment ==
=== Sony Pictures Networks ===
==== YAY! Animations ====
In 2019, Sony Pictures Networks established its animation production division YAY! Animations to produce animated series for Sony YAY! and third-party platforms.

== Sony Music Entertainment Japan ==
=== Aniplex ===
==== Boundary ====
On April 1, 2020, Aniplex established Boundary, a 3DCG animation production company subsidiary. CloverWorks president Akira Shimizu was appointed the studio's president and representative director. Since its inception, Boundary has been mainly involved in the CG production of CloverWorks projects.

== JOEN ==
On May 30, 2022, Aniplex, its subsidiary, CloverWorks, Wit Studio, and Shueisha announced the establishment of JOEN, a joint venture in the production of animated TV series, feature films, and short clips. CloverWorks' Corporate Officer Yūichi Fukushima and WIT Studio Director Tetsuya Nakatake, producers of the adaptation of Spy × Family, a collaboration between their respective studios, were appointed representative directors of JOEN.

== ame pippin ==
On February 18, 2025, Masaaki Yuasa announced the establishment of ame pippin in partnership with Asmik Ace, Aniplex and CoMix Wave Films.

== See also ==
- Screen Gems (1921–1946)
