= Pixomondo =

International visual effects and virtual production company

- Type: Subsidiary
- Industry: Visual effects Computer animation
- Founded: 2000; 26 years ago in Pfungstadt, Germany
- Founder: Thilo Kuther
- Headquarters: Los Angeles, California
- Number of locations: 7 (2021)
- Key people: Jonny Slow (CEO)
- Services: Visual effects, Virtual Production, VAD, CGI, 3D Animation, Previs, Techvis, Postvis
- Number of employees: 655 (2019)
- Parent: Mayfair Equity Partners (2018–2022); Sony Pictures Entertainment (2022–present)
- Website: pixomondo.com

Pixomondo (PXO) is an academy and Emmy award-winning international visual effects and virtual production company with studios in Los Angeles, Frankfurt, Stuttgart, Vancouver, Toronto, Montreal, and London. The company provides virtual production and visual effects for feature films, television, and commercials. As of 2019, PXO employs over 655 people worldwide.

== History ==
PXO was founded in Pfungstadt, Germany as a design studio in 2000 by Thilo Kuther. The company began its work creating video installations and 3D-animations for high-end corporate clients such as Porsche and Bertelsmann. By the end of 2003, PXO consisted of its one office in Pfungstadt and 40 employees. In 2005, the company first began working in the entertainment business by producing the visual effects for the German television film Atlantropa - Der Traum vom neuen Kontinent. In 2005, a second location, specializing in feature films, opened in Ludwigsburg, Germany. At this location, the company produced nearly all the visual effects for the international feature film The Red Baron, which was released in 2008, and earned PXO its first international recognition. In the same year, the first studio abroad opened in London. In 2007 and 2008, studios were opened in Frankfurt and Los Angeles, respectively. Also in 2008, Pixomondo was commissioned by director Roland Emmerich to produce over 100 complete CG-environments for his feature film 2012. PXO's first offices in Asia, specifically in Shanghai and Beijing, were opened in 2009. In 2011, the company expanded its London office and added two studios in Munich and Hamburg, as well as one in Toronto in 2011.

PXO closed its London office in February 2013. In 2013, PXO closed its Shanghai and Berlin offices, naming restructuring processes as a reason for the closures. In 2014, the office in Shanghai reopened. In 2018, Mayfair Equity Partners completed a majority investment in PXO. The deal valued PXO at $65 million. Less than a year later, Jonny Slow was appointed as global CEO. In early 2019, PXO opened its Montreal office. In June 2021 PXO closed its Beijing and Shanghai offices and by September had announced a new London division that will offer virtual production services.

In October 2022, Sony Pictures Entertainment acquired 100% of Pixomondo from Mayfair Equity Partners.

In March 2026, it was reported that Sony Pictures Entertainment would wind down Pixomondo after it completes its last remaining contracts. All of Pixomondo's units would be integrated into other areas of Sony Pictures, such as its VFX division being absorbed into Sony Pictures Imageworks. On September 29, 2026, it was reported that Dark Slope had acquired Pixomondo's virtual production studio.

== Major projects ==
=== Virtual production ===
In September 2020, PXO announced it began construction on a virtual production studio in Toronto, Canada, with Mayfair backing the new venture with a significant new financial commitment. PXO assembled a team of technical partners for the studio that included Epic Games' Unreal Engine, LED manufacturer ROE Visual, Nvidia, and Brompton Technology among others. In January 2021, the inaugural project to shoot on the virtual production stage was Star Trek: Discovery (season four) followed by the spin-off series Star Trek: Strange New Worlds. In July 2021, PXO, in a partnership with Canadian TV and film equipment rental business William F. White International, opened a second virtual production studio in Toronto. Known as Stage 6, it is designed for shorter duration shoots, including commercials and music videos. In November 2021, Netflix announced it partnered with PXO on a custom-built virtual production facility in Vancouver for its live-action adaptation of Avatar: The Last Airbender. In 2022, the Vancouver stage was named the Largest LED Stage by Guinness World Records and is featured in the “Guinness World Records 2023” print edition.

=== Academy Award ===
On February 26, 2012, PXO won the Academy Award for Best Visual Effects for its work on the film Hugo. The award was presented to Alex Henning and Ben Grossmann, who were the supervisors of the project. With 854 scenes that have a running time of about 62 minutes in the final film, PXO produced about 94% of the film's visual effects. In 2014, the company earned its second Academy Award for Best Visual Effects nomination for its work on Star Trek Into Darkness.

=== Star Trek franchise ===
After a successful collaboration on Star Trek Into Darkness, PXO continued to work on the franchise, beginning with Star Trek: Discovery, followed by Star Trek: Short Treks and Star Trek: Picard. The company earned a VFX Emmy nomination for its work on Season 2 of Discovery. PXO also provided the animation for Short Treks' "The Girl Who Made the Stars" and "Ephraim and Dot," both of which premiered on December 12, 2019. They marked a historic return to animation for Star Trek, which had not delved into the world of animation since the 1973-1974 The Animated Series. PXO took the franchise in a new direction when Discovery Season 4 adopted virtual production for the first time in the franchise's history. Strange New Worlds is the first new series to use virtual production from its inception.

=== Game of Thrones ===
PXO was brought on to the HBO television series Game of Thrones in Season 2 and remained through the final season. PXO VFX Supervisor Sven Martin and his team worked closely with the show's VFX group. Martin told Forbes Magazine that they wanted to depict the dragons as "living animals with just enough expressions to understand their feelings…similar to the emotional connection with pets." "We started with a base model, which was established in season 1, but we went for a darker, grittier approach," Martin told Entertainment Weekly. "We did a lot of redesign, made them more spiky, even in the baby state. It was a little bit of a relaunch, but we still kept it believable for the audience."

The key to grounding these mythical creatures, which do not exist in real life, was to give Drogon, Rhaegal, and Viserion real-world animal counterparts the audience could identify with. "The dragons were always in close contact with the actors," says Martin. "And we were shooting outside on real locations. So everything is real and not meant to be a fantasy. We wanted to transfer that." Studying bird and bat anatomies influenced the dragons' wingspan design. The PXO team even dissected a supermarket chicken to get a sense of how the wings could move. Observing geese on the ground playing with their own wings was later emulated when the dragons were shown sitting down at ease. Color patterns were gleaned from frogs and cheetahs, while crocodiles, lizards, and other reptiles were used for skin structure.

Martin's team met with the show's VFX Supervisor Joe Bauer at the start of each season to discuss new design elements, as the dragons were maturing and growing. For example, they became more guard dog-like as they grew into their roles as Dany's guards. When they got angry or wanted to threaten the enemy, gills popped out of their necks. "That idea came from the fruit lizard, which does exactly the same thing, just in a different direction," Martin told Entertainment Weekly. When Danny started riding Drogon, more spikes were added to him so she'd have something to hold on to.

PXO is currently working on the Game of Thrones prequel, House of the Dragon.

=== Others ===
PXO has a longstanding relationship with filmmaker Roland Emmerich, having first worked together on 2012, followed by Independence Day: Resurgence, the World War II drama Midway (which PXO co-produced), Moonfall and the Emmerich-produced feature film adaptation of Mozart's The Magic Flute. Midway was among 20 films shortlisted in the Visual Effects category for the 92nd Academy Awards®. When Emmerich received the 2019 Visionary VES Award from the Visual Effects Society at its 18th annual awards ceremony, PXO founder Thilo Kuther was among those he acknowledged from the podium.

On November 1, 2019, PXO was part of Apple TV+'s historic launch by providing the VFX for two series, including See and For All Mankind. The inaugural episode of See, earned PXO a VES Award nomination for Outstanding Supporting Visual Effects in a Photoreal Episode which included the company's creation of the infamous rockwall sequence. The following season of See saw PXO receive a nomination in the same category, this time for the season finale episode. See won, beating out such shows as The Handmaid's Tale and Squid Game among others.

=== Themed entertainment ===
Prior to opening its virtual production division, PXO previously had a themed entertainment division that produced digital walkthrough branded experiences, flying theater rides, immersive dome installations, digital dark ride media, and concert installations. Some of that work can be found in the New York's Times Square attraction, National Geographic Encounters, where PXO brought to life underwater ecosystems including 150 artificially intelligence-driven creatures ranging from sea lions to sharks to jellyfish via exclusive VR technology. PXO was part of the July 2018 launch of Warner Bros. World Abu Dhabi indoor theme park by working on five themed rides including the 4D flying theater experience, Green Lantern Galactic Odyssey. PXO partnered with rockband Aerosmith for their Las Vegas residency, Deuces Are Wild, which kicked off on April 6, 2019. Using never-before-seen visuals from Aerosmith's archives, PXO produced a 12-screen visual media presentation (including a 140-foot x 40-foot high-definition screen), complete with motion graphics, animations, stream of consciousness imagery and flashback moments of the band's colorful past. PXO also brought to life Aerosmith's infamous "wings" logo on stage, which unfolded to signal the band's arrival at the top of the show. Additionally, Pixomondo's 20-minute visual media pre-show took the audience through the band's historic journey, beginning with Woodstock all the way to the present, and included abstract imagery, as well as the iconic Aerosmith van. The company's work on Aerosmith's Las Vegas Residency earned PXO a 2019 Knight of Illumination Award (KOI-USA) nomination in the Best Concert Video Content category.

== Locations ==
As of March 2024, PXO has offices in the following locations:

- Los Angeles
- Frankfurt
- Stuttgart
- Toronto
- Vancouver
- Montreal
- London

== Filmography ==
=== Feature films ===
- 2008: The Red Baron
- 2009: Das Vaterspiel
- 2009: Ninja Assassin
- 2009: 2012
- 2010: Devil's Kickers
- 2010: Percy Jackson & the Olympians: The Lightning Thief
- 2010: The Ghost Writer
- 2010: Iron Man 2 (additional visual effects)
- 2010: The Losers
- 2010: A Nightmare on Elm Street
- 2010: Knight and Day (additional visual effects)
- 2011: The Green Hornet
- 2011: The Rite
- 2011: Sucker Punch
- 2011: Fast Five
- 2011: Super 8
- 2011: Green Lantern
- 2011: Zookeeper
- 2011: Hugo
- 2011: Melancholia
- 2012: Dark Tide
- 2012: Yoko
- 2012: Wrath of the Titans
- 2012: The Amazing Spider-Man
- 2012: Snow White & the Huntsman
- 2012: The Hunger Games
- 2012: Red Tails
- 2012: The Twilight Saga: Breaking Dawn – Part 2
- 2012: Raven the Little Rascal
- 2012: Journey 2: The Mysterious Island
- 2013: Die Männer der Emden
- 2013: Rush
- 2013: Fast & Furious 6
- 2013: After Earth
- 2013: Only Lovers Left Alive
- 2013: Beautiful Creatures
- 2013: Oblivion
- 2013: A Good Day to Die Hard
- 2013: Star Trek Into Darkness
- 2013: The Physician
- 2013: One Night Surprise
- 2014: A Most Wanted Man
- 2014: Pettersson und Findus – Kleiner Quälgeist, große Freundschaft
- 2014: The Breakup Guru
- 2014: Gone with the Bullets
- 2014: The Hunger Games: Mockingjay – Part 1
- 2014: Impossible
- 2015: Furious 7
- 2015: Wolf Totem
- 2015: Zhong Kui: Snow Girl and the Dark Crystal
- 2015: Fantastic Four
- 2015: Bridge of Spies
- 2016: The Promise
- 2016: Independence Day: Resurgence
- 2016: The Divergent Series: Allegiant
- 2016: Crouching Tiger, Hidden Dragon: Sword of Destiny
- 2016: Live By Night
- 2017: Wonder Woman
- 2017: Skyhunter
- 2017: Power Rangers
- 2017: The Dark Tower
- 2017: The Fate of the Furious
- 2018: Overlord
- 2018: Alpha
- 2018: Mary Poppins Returns
- 2018: Help, I Shrunk My Parents
- 2018: Goosebumps 2: Haunted Halloween
- 2018: The Girl in the Spider's Web
- 2018: Crazy Rich Asians
- 2019: A Dog's Way Home
- 2019: Pegasus
- 2019: Child's Play
- 2019: Midway
- 2019: Iron Sky: The Coming Race
- 2019: The Wandering Earth
- 2019: Only Cloud Knows (Chinese film)
- 2020: Sprite Sisters - Vier zauberhafte Schwestern
- 2020: The Way Back
- 2020: Lassie Come Home
- 2020: The Hunt
- 2020: Ich war noch niemals in New York (I've never been to New York)
- 2020: Berlin Alexanderplatz
- 2020: The King of Staten Island
- 2020: Greenland
- 2021: The Water Man
- 2021: Without Remorse
- 2022: Moonfall
- 2022: Day Shift
- 2022: Spiderhead
- 2022: Matilda the Musical
- 2023: The Pale Blue Eye
- 2023: Ant-Man and the Wasp: Quantumania
- 2023: John Wick: Chapter 4
- 2023: Ghosted
- 2023: Creation of the Gods I: Kingdom of Storms
- 2023: Gran Turismo
- 2023: Across the Furious Sea
- 2024: Damsel
- 2024: Borderlands

=== TV Shows ===
- 2008: Fringe (season 1)
- 2010: Outsourced
- 2010: Undercovers
- 2011: Terra Nova
- 2011: Hawaii Five-0 (season 2)
- 2011: Grimm (season 1)
- 2012: Revolution
- 2012: Go On
- 2012: The Mindy Project
- 2012–2019: Game of Thrones (from season 2 through season 8)
- 2012: Mockingbird Lane (television pilot)
- 2013: Da Vinci's Demons
- 2013–2014: Sleepy Hollow
- 2013: Bonnie & Clyde (miniseries)
- 2014–2016: Marco Polo
- 2015: The Walking Dead
- 2015: Limitless
- 2015: Fear the Walking Dead
- 2015: Agents of S.H.I.E.L.D.
- 2016: Fargo
- 2016–2021: Goliath
- 2017–2022: The Orville
- 2017–2025: Star Trek: Discovery
- 2017: Fear the Walking Dead
- 2018–2019: The Magicians
- 2018–2019: Counterpart
- 2018–2022: Westworld
- 2018–2020: Star Trek: Short Treks
- 2018: Siren
- 2019: Kim Possible (television film)
- 2019: Euphoria
- 2019: The OA
- 2019–2022: See
- 2019: For All Mankind
- 2019: Die Neue Zeit
- 2019–2023: Carnival Row
- 2019–2020: The Mandalorian
- 2019: Watchmen
- 2019–2026: The Boys
- 2020: Locke & Key
- 2020: Star Trek: Picard
- 2020–2024: The Umbrella Academy
- 2020: Raised by Wolves
- 2020–2023: Perry Mason
- 2020: The Stand
- 2021: Debris
- 2021: Lost in Space
- 2021: Station 11
- 2022: Winning Time
- 2022: Halo
- 2022: Love and Death
- 2022: Star Trek: Strange New Worlds
- 2022: House of the Dragon
- 2022: Archive 81
- 2022: Upload

=== TV productions ===
- 2005: Atlantropa - Der Traum vom neuen Kontinent
- 2009: Volcano
- 2009: Crash Point: Berlin
- 2010: Terra X: Supertiere
- 2011: Hindenburg: The Last Flight
- 2012: Terra X: Supertiere 2
- 2013: Terra X: Supertiere 3
- 2013: Heroes

== Awards and nominations ==
The following list of awards and nominations for Pixomondo lists accolades that have been presented to a team containing at least one employee of Pixomondo.

Year	Nominated work	Award	For	Result
2012	Hugo	Academy Award	Best Visual Effects	Won
2012	Hugo	VES Award	Outstanding Supporting Visual Effects in a Feature Motion Picture	Won
2012	Hugo	International 3D Society Award	Live Action 3D Feature/3D Moment of the Year for the Opening Scene / Stereography – Live Action	Won
2012	Hugo	Satellite Award 2012	Best Visual Effects	Won
2012	Hugo	BAFTA Film Award 2012	Special Visual Effects	Nominated
2012	Game of Thrones	Creative Arts Emmy Award	Outstanding Special Visual Effects (Episode "Valar Morghulis")	Won
2012	Game of Thrones	AEAF Award	"Fascinating VFX Work on season two" (In category TV series)	
2012	Game of Thrones	Animago Award	Best Post Production (Season 2)	Nominated
2013	Game of Thrones	Creative Arts Emmy Award	Outstanding Special Visual Effects (Episode "Valar Dohaeris")	Won
2014	Game of Thrones	VES Award	Outstanding Visual Effects in a Broadcast Program (Episode "Valar Dohaeris")	Won
2014	Game of Thrones	Creative Arts Emmy Award	Outstanding Special Visual Effects (Episode "The Children")	Won
2015	Game of Thrones	VES Award	Outstanding Visual Effects in a Visual Effects-Driven Photoreal/Live Action Broadcast Program (Episode "The Children")	Won
2014	Star Trek Into Darkness	Academy Award	Best Visual Effects	Nominated
2015	Gone with the Bullets	Asian Film Awards	Best Visual Effects	Won
2015	Wolf Totem	Beijing International Film Festival	Best Visual Effects	Won
2017	Alexander Wang & Pepsi Black	IDA: International Design Award 2017	Gold in Multimedia / Animation (Director: Aslan Malik)	Won
2018	Westworld	Creative Arts Emmy Award	Outstanding Special Visual Effects(Episode "The Passenger")	Nominated
2019	The Orville	Creative Arts Emmy Award	Outstanding Special Visual Effects (Episode "Identity Part II")	Nominated
2019	Star Trek: Discovery	Creative Arts Emmy Award	Outstanding Special Visual Effects (Episode "Such Sweet Sorrow, Part 2")	Nominated
2020	See	VES Award	Outstanding Supporting Visual Effects in a Photoreal Episode (Episode "Godflame," Season One)	Nominated
2020	Ich war noch niemals in New York (I've never been to New York)	Deutscher Filmpreis (German Film Awards, also called Lola Awards)	Best Visual Effects and Animation	Nominated
2020	Berlin Alexanderplatz	Deutscher Filmpreis (German Film Awards, also called Lola Awards)	Best Visual Effects and Animation	Nominated
2020	Child's Play	Leo Awards	Best Visual Effects Motion Picture	Won
2020	Westworld	Creative Arts Emmy Award	Outstanding Special Visual Effects (Episode "Crisis Theory," Season Three)	Nominated
2022	See	VES Award	Outstanding Supporting Visual Effects in a Photoreal Episode (Episode "Rock-A-Bye," Season Two)	Won

== See also ==
- Sony Pictures Imageworks
- List of animation studios owned by Sony
