= Sony Pictures Animation =

American animation studio

Sony Pictures Animation Inc.
- Logo used since 2018
- Type: Subsidiary
- Industry: Animation
- Predecessors: Screen Gems (1921–1946); Adelaide Productions
- Founded: May 9, 2002; 24 years ago
- Headquarters: 5750 Wilshire Boulevard, Los Angeles, California, United States
- Key people: Kristine Belson (co-president); Damien de Froberville (co-president)
- Products: Feature films; Short films; Television series
- Number of employees: 255 (2018)
- Parent: Sony Pictures Digital (2002–2015); Sony Pictures (2015–present)
- Website: sonypicturesanimation.com

Sony Pictures Animation Inc., also referred to as Sony Animation, and abbreviated to SPA, is an American animation studio owned by Sony Pictures through their Motion Picture Group division and founded on May 9, 2002. The studio is based in Los Angeles, California. Most of the studio's films — either theatrical or streaming-service exclusive — are distributed worldwide by Sony Pictures under Columbia Pictures or through Netflix, while direct-to-video releases are released by Sony Pictures.

The studio has produced 31 feature films, the first being Open Season, which was released on September 29, 2006, and the most recent being Goat, which was released on February 13, 2026. Their upcoming slate of films include Spider-Man: Beyond the Spider-Verse on June 18, 2027, Wish Dragon 2 in summer 2027, The Haunting of Hotel Transylvania on October 8, 2027, Buds on December 22, 2027, and an untitled KPop Demon Hunters sequel. Spider-Man: Across the Spider-Verse is the studio's highest-grossing film, while KPop Demon Hunters is the most-watched title on Netflix which also became the first Netflix film to top the box office.

== Background ==
After the closure of the Screen Gems cartoon studio in 1946 and before the establishment of SPA, Columbia Pictures distributed a few animated films from 1959 to 2006 that were produced by outside studios, including 1001 Arabian Nights, The Little Prince and the Eight-Headed Dragon, Hey There, It's Yogi Bear!, The Man Called Flintstone, Jack and the Beanstalk, American Pop, Heavy Metal, Care Bears Movie II: A New Generation, Final Fantasy: The Spirits Within, Eight Crazy Nights, and Monster House.

== History ==
In 2001, Sony Pictures considered selling off its visual effects facility Sony Pictures Imageworks but after failing to find a suitable buyer, having been impressed with the CGI sequences of Stuart Little and seeing the box office successes of DreamWorks Animation's Shrek, SPI was reconfigured to become an animation studio. Astro Boy, which had been in development at Sony since 1997 as a live-action film, was set to be SPI's first all-CGI film, but never made it to fruition. On May 9, 2002, Sony Pictures Animation was established to develop characters, stories and movies with SPI taking over the digital production while maintaining its visual effects production. Meanwhile, SPI produced two short films, the Academy Award-winning The ChubbChubbs! and Early Bloomer, as a result of testing its strengths and weaknesses in producing all-CGI animation.

Logo used from 2006 to 2011

On its first anniversary on May 9, 2003, Sony Pictures Animation announced a full slate of animated projects in development: Open Season, an adaptation of a Celtic folk ballad Tam Lin, Cloudy with a Chance of Meatballs, Surf's Up, and a feature-length film version of The ChubbChubbs!

Logo used from 2011 to 2018

On May 27, 2014, it was announced that Netflix had acquired streaming rights to films produced by Sony Pictures Animation.

On November 3, 2014, the studio collaborated with Frederator Studios' Cartoon Hangover on GO! Cartoons, an incubator series consisting of 12 short films, with at least one short film being developed into a series. The short films were funded by SPA, with the additional goal of attracting new talent for the studio.

In June 2019, Sony Pictures Animation announced that they had launched an "International" division headed by Aron Warner at the 2019 Annecy International Animated Film Festival, with Wish Dragon set to be the division's first film. The same day, they also announced an "Alternative" division aimed at producing adult animated content, headed by Katie Baron and Kevin Noel. In addition to Tartakovsky's films Black Knight and Fixed, the division's TV shows are set to include Superbago, a co-production with Stoopid Buddy Stoodios that was originally greenlit as a feature film; and Hungry Ghosts, a series based on the Dark Horse graphic novel by Anthony Bourdain and Joel Rose. They had previously announced their plans to produce adult content at the 2017 Annecy festival.

In April 2021, Disney and Sony Pictures reached a multi-year deal to let Sony's titles (such as films from the Spider-Man, Jumanji, Hotel Transylvania, Ghostbusters franchises, and other films made by Sony Pictures Animation, etc., and anime licensed by Funimation/Crunchyroll like Attack on Titan and Fate/stay night: Unlimited Blade Works) to stream on Hulu and Disney+ following a period of availability on Netflix. A significant number of Sony titles began streaming on Disney+ starting in September 2022. It includes films from 2022 onwards.

In January 2021, during the onset of the COVID-19 pandemic, Netflix purchased the distribution rights to The Mitchells vs. the Machines. Later that year, Netflix released Wish Dragon in June, and Vivo in August. While The Mitchells vs. the Machines and Wish Dragon were released in theatres only in mainland China, Vivo was released in limited theatres in the United States. The 2025 films KPop Demon Hunters and Fixed were distributed by Netflix as part of the company's first-look deal with the streamer, with both films receiving limited releases. Fixed was originally going to be released through Warner Bros. Pictures and New Line Cinema, but it was dropped in 2024 as part of cost-saving measures by parent company Warner Bros. Discovery, with the rights returning to Sony. Netflix would instead end up purchasing the rights to the film.

== Process ==
In a similar fashion to Warner Bros. Pictures Animation, Paramount Animation and 20th Century Animation, the studio outsources their films to other animation companies and visual effects studios, with the majority of their films being animated by sister company Sony Pictures Imageworks. Some films, such as Arthur Christmas and The Pirates! Band of Misfits were acquired by Sony Pictures Animation to be released under their banner while others, such as Goosebumps and Peter Rabbit, were made with no involvement from the studio.

According to Kristine Belson, president of SPA, the studio produces films on a 1:1 development-to-production ratio, meaning that the studio puts films into development as much as it places films in production, unlike other animation studios.

== Filmography ==
Release timeline
2006	Open Season
2007	Surf's Up
2008	Open Season 2
2009	Cloudy with a Chance of Meatballs
2010	Open Season 3
2011	The Smurfs
2011	Arthur Christmas
2012	The Pirates! Band of Misfits
2012	Hotel Transylvania
2013	The Smurfs 2
2013	Cloudy with a Chance of Meatballs 2
2014
2015	Hotel Transylvania 2
2015	Goosebumps
2016	Open Season: Scared Silly
2017	Surf's Up 2: WaveMania
2017	Smurfs: The Lost Village
2017	The Emoji Movie
2017	The Star
2018	Peter Rabbit
2018	Hotel Transylvania 3: Summer Vacation
2018	Goosebumps 2: Haunted Halloween
2018	Spider-Man: Into the Spider-Verse
2019	The Angry Birds Movie 2
2020
2021	The Mitchells vs. the Machines
2021	Wish Dragon
2021	Vivo
2022	Hotel Transylvania: Transformania
2023	Spider-Man: Across the Spider-Verse
2024
2025	KPop Demon Hunters
2025	Fixed
2026	Goat
2027	Spider-Man: Beyond the Spider-Verse
2027	Wish Dragon 2
2027	The Haunting of Hotel Transylvania
2027	Buds
2028
2029	Untitled KPop Demon Hunters sequel

Sony Pictures Animation's first feature film was Open Season, released in September 2006, which became Sony's second-highest-grossing home entertainment film in 2007 and spawned three direct-to-video sequels. Its second feature film, Surf's Up was released in June 2007, was nominated for an Academy Award for Best Animated Feature, and won two Annie Awards. SPA's first 3D movie since the IMAX 3D release of Open Season, Cloudy with a Chance of Meatballs, was released in September 2009 and was nominated for four Annie Awards, including Best Animated Feature. The Smurfs (2011) was the studio's first CGI/live-action hybrid. SPA's parent company Sony Pictures had partnered in 2007 with Aardman Animations to finance, co-produce and distribute feature films. Together, they produced two films: Arthur Christmas (2011), and The Pirates! In an Adventure with Scientists! (2012), the latter which was SPA's first and currently only stop-motion film. In 2012, SPA released Hotel Transylvania, which grossed over $350 million worldwide and launched a successful franchise with three sequels and a TV series. Two sequels were released in 2013: The Smurfs 2 and Cloudy with a Chance of Meatballs 2.

SPA's latest releases are Goat, a sports film starring a goat from Stephen Curry and Erick Peyton of Unanimous Media, KPop Demon Hunters, an urban fantasy film about a K-pop group with magical powers, Spider-Man: Into the Spider-Verse, an animated superhero film based on the Spider-Man comics and featuring the Miles Morales incarnation of the character and its sequel Spider-Man: Across the Spider-Verse. Other recent movies from SPA include The Angry Birds Movie 2, the sequel to the 2016 film The Angry Birds Movie produced by Rovio Animation, The Mitchells vs. the Machines, a robot apocalypse/road trip film written and directed by Michael Rianda and Jeff Rowe while produced by longtime collaborators Phil Lord and Christopher Miller, Wish Dragon, a co-production with Base FX, the musical film, Lin-Manuel Miranda's Vivo, which marks Sony Pictures Animation's first musical film, Hotel Transylvania: Transformania, the fourth installment in the Hotel Transylvania franchise. SPA has since signed Genndy Tartakovsky to a long-term deal with the studio to develop and direct original films starting with Tartakovsky's R-rated animated film Fixed.

=== Upcoming projects ===
As of October 2026, upcoming films from the studio include Spider-Man: Beyond the Spider-Verse (releasing on June 18, 2027), The Haunting of Hotel Transylvania (releasing on October 8, 2027), and Buds (releasing on December 22, 2027). The K-Pop Demon Hunters sequel, directed by Maggie Kang, and Chris Appelhans, is in on-going production. (releasing TBD 2029) Projects in development include an animated Ghostbusters spin-off film, another Tartakovsky project titled Black Knight, Tao, a China-set science-fiction adventure film directed by The Lego Movie 2: The Second Part story artist Emily Dean, Tut, an afro-futuristic coming-of-age story set in ancient Egypt directed by Hair Love creator Matthew A. Cherry, and an animated film adaptation based on the science fiction podcast Bubble (a co-production with Point Grey Pictures and Matt Tolmach Productions).

=== Franchises ===
Titles	Films	Shorts	Seasons	Release dates
Open Season	4	1	1	2006–present
Surf's Up	2	0	0	2007–present
Cloudy with a Chance of Meatballs	2	4	2	2009–present
The Smurfs	3	2	0	2011–2017
Hotel Transylvania	5	3	2	2012–present
Goosebumps (Note: Sony Pictures Animation was involved with both the first film and its sequel.)	2	0	2	2015–2018
Angry Birds (Note: Sony Pictures Animation was involved in the second film despite them not being involved in the first one, with the upcoming third film now being distributed by Paramount Pictures and Sega, replacing Sony Pictures as distributor.)	2	5	0	2016–2019
Peter Rabbit (Note: Sony Pictures Animation was involved with the first film.)	2	1	0	2018–2021
Spider-Verse	3	2	0	2018–present
The Mitchells vs. the Machines	1	1	0	2021–present
Wish Dragon	2	0	0	2021–present
KPop Demon Hunters	2	1	0	2025–present

=== Highest-grossing films ===
Highest-grossing films in North America
Rank	Title	Year	Box office gross
1	Spider-Man: Across the Spider-Verse	2023	$381,593,754
2	Spider-Man: Into the Spider-Verse	2018	$190,241,310
3	Hotel Transylvania 2	2015	$169,305,890
4	Hotel Transylvania 3: Summer Vacation	2018	$167,510,016
5	Hotel Transylvania	2012	$148,313,048
6	The Smurfs	2011	$142,614,158
7	Cloudy with a Chance of Meatballs	2009	$124,870,275
8	Cloudy with a Chance of Meatballs 2	2013	$119,793,567
9	Peter Rabbit	2018	$115,253,424
10	Goat	2026	$101,668,279
11	The Emoji Movie	2017	$86,089,513
12	Open Season	2006	$85,105,259
13	Goosebumps	2015	$80,080,379
14	The Smurfs 2	2013	$71,017,784
15	Surf's Up	2007	$58,867,694

Highest-grossing films worldwide
Rank	Title	Year	Box office gross
1	Spider-Man: Across the Spider-Verse	2023	$690,824,738
2	The Smurfs	2011	$563,749,323
3	Hotel Transylvania 3: Summer Vacation	2018	$528,504,608
4	Hotel Transylvania 2	2015	$475,186,976
5	Spider-Man: Into the Spider-Verse	2018	$393,602,435
6	Hotel Transylvania	2012	$358,488,860
7	Peter Rabbit	2018	$351,516,614
8	The Smurfs 2	2013	$347,545,360
9	Cloudy with a Chance of Meatballs 2	2013	$274,325,949
10	Cloudy with a Chance of Meatballs	2010	$243,006,136
11	The Emoji Movie	2017	$217,776,646
12	Open Season	2006	$200,811,689
13	Smurfs: The Lost Village	2017	$197,183,546
14	Goat	2026	$193,000,000
15	The Angry Birds Movie 2	2019	$152,018,812

== See also ==
- Adelaide Productions
- Sony Pictures Imageworks
- Sony Pictures Television Kids
- Screen Gems (1921–1946)
- Sony Pictures Kids Zone
- United Productions of America
- List of Sony theatrical animated feature films
- List of unproduced Sony Pictures Animation projects
- List of animation studios owned by Sony
