= Sony Pictures Imageworks =

Visual effects and animation studio

Sony Pictures Imageworks Inc.
- Logo used since 2006
- Type: Subsidiary
- Industry: CGI visual effects Motion pictures
- Founded: May 26, 1992; 34 years ago
- Headquarters: Floor 4, The Post, 349 W Georgia St, Vancouver, British Columbia V6B 0N2, Canada
- Additional offices: 5750 Wilshire Boulevard, Los Angeles, California, United States; 700 Rue Saint-Hubert, Suite 400, Montreal, Quebec HY2 0C1, Canada
- Number of locations: 3
- Key people: Michelle Grady (president)
- Products: Visual effects; Computer animation
- Number of employees: 800+ (2017)
- Parent: Sony Pictures
- Website: imageworks.com

Sony Pictures Imageworks Inc. (also known as Imageworks) is a Canadian visual effects and computer animation studio headquartered in Vancouver, British Columbia, with additional offices in Los Angeles, California and Montreal, Quebec. SPI is a unit of Sony Pictures' Motion Picture Group.

The company has been recognized by the Academy of Motion Picture Arts and Sciences winning the Academy Award for Best Visual Effects for their work on Spider-Man 2, as well as the Academy Award for Best Animated Film for Into the Spider-Verse and Academy Award for Best Animated Short Film for The ChubbChubbs!, having also received many other nominations for their work.

SPI has provided visual effects for many films; most recent include The Meg, Men in Black: International, and Spider-Man: Far From Home. They also provided services for several of director Robert Zemeckis' films, including Contact, Cast Away, The Polar Express, and Beowulf.

Since the foundation of its sister company Sony Pictures Animation in 2002, SPI would go on to animate nearly all of SPA's films, including Open Season, Surf's Up, KPop Demon Hunters, Goat, and films in the Cloudy with a Chance of Meatballs, Smurfs, Hotel Transylvania and Spider-Verse franchises, in addition to animating films for other studios such as Arthur Christmas for Aardman Animations (co-produced by SPA), Storks and Smallfoot for Warner Animation Group (now known as Warner Bros. Pictures Animation), The Angry Birds Movie for Rovio Animation and its sequel (co-produced by SPA), and Over the Moon for Netflix and Pearl Studio, The Sea Beast and In Your Dreams for Netflix Animation Studios, and The Bad Guys 2 and Forgotten Island for DreamWorks Animation.

== History ==
Sony Pictures Imageworks was formed on May 26, 1992 with five employees to use computers to help plan complicated scenes for live-action films. Located in the former TriStar building, their first work was a previsualization for the 1993 film Striking Distance. In April 1993, the previously unnamed unit received its current name. In 1997, SPI became part of Sony Pictures Entertainment's Digital Studios unit.

To fill the gaps between VFX jobs, SPI decided to partake in the more profitable animation business. Its first independent animated effort was the 5-minute short The ChubbChubbs! directed by Eric Armstrong. In 2002, it won the Oscar for Best Animated Short. Early Bloomer, released in 2003, was the division's second short film and originally made as a storyboarding exercise. SPI completed its first feature animation project in 2006 with the release of Open Season, which was produced by sister company Sony Pictures Animation.

In 2007, SPI acquired Indian visual effects studio FrameFlow to take advantage of lower labor costs. Renamed to Imageworks India, a modern facility was opened in Chennai a year later. To leverage New Mexico's tax rebates and talent base, a satellite production facility was opened in 2007 in Albuquerque, becoming the largest post-production operation in the state. In 2010, SPI opened a production studio in Vancouver, British Columbia, in order to take advantage of the local talent pool and government film production incentives. Two years later, the studio doubled its Vancouver facilities. At the same time, the Albuquerque studio was closed down due to declining state subsidies and difficulty with attracting artists to move there.

In the beginning of 2014, as a cost-cutting move, SPI transferred a portion of its technology team from its headquarters in Culver City to Vancouver. By May 2014, entire headquarters and production had been moved to Vancouver, with only a small office remaining in Culver City. At the same time, SPI closed down its Indian studio, laying off around 100 employees. A year later, over 700 artists moved into a new 74,000-square feet headquarters in Vancouver.

On October 6, 2023, Cartoon Brew reported that DreamWorks Animation was moving away from producing films in-house at their Glendale campus to rely more heavily on outside studios after 2024, as part of a layoff by chief operating officer Randy Lake in a series of meetings the previous month. According to the report, SPI was named as the animation service for a then-unannounced DreamWorks sequel (The Bad Guys 2) scheduled for 2025. The film would use a "mixed production model", in which pre-production would be done in-house at DreamWorks along with approximately 50% of the asset build and one hour of production, while SPI would handle the other 50% of asset builds and 20 minutes of shot production.

== Technology ==
During 2009–2010, SPI made a transition from a traditional, emotional, multi-pass rendering system to a largely single-pass, global illumination system incorporating modern ray-tracing and physically based shading techniques. They have achieved that with Arnold Renderer, an unbiased stochastic ray tracer. Arnold, started in 1997 by Marcos Fajardo, was co-developed between 2004 and 2009 with SPI, where Marcos was employed, and a commercial branch is being developed by Marcos' Madrid-based company Solid Angle SL (now owned by Autodesk). Arnold was used on projects such as Monster House, Cloudy with a Chance of Meatballs, 2012, Alice in Wonderland, The Smurfs and Arthur Christmas.

== Filmography ==
Sony Pictures Imageworks has provided visual effects and feature animation for the following films:

Year	Films
1993	Last Action Hero; In the Line of Fire; So I Married an Axe Murderer; Striking Distance (CGI previsualization, uncredited); Mr. Jones (titles only); Rudy (titles only); Look Who's Talking Now; My Life; The Pelican Brief (falcon jet air to air shot)
1994	Guarding Tess (CGI titles only); Speed; Wolf; Blankman (CGI blankwheel screen graphics and CGI plate supervision)
1995	Hideaway; Tall Tale; Die Hard with a Vengeance; Johnny Mnemonic (CGI cyberspace sequence); Judge Dredd (CGI additional digital compositing); The Net (CGI plane crash sequence); Virtuosity (CGI tendril animation); Money Train (CGI money train wreck sequence/CGI digital composites); Wings of Courage
1996	James and the Giant Peach (CGI water, sharks, and seagulls); The Craft; The Cable Guy; Phenomenon; The Ghost and the Darkness; Michael
1997	Anaconda; Contact; Starship Troopers (CGI spaceship); The Postman; As Good as It Gets
1998	The Replacement Killers; Sphere (CGI end sequence); City of Angels; Paulie; The Big Hit; Godzilla; You've Got Mail (CGI titles only); Patch Adams; Star Trek: Insurrection
1999	Big Daddy; The Astronaut's Wife (CGI visual effects); The Ninth Gate; Jakob the Liar; Stuart Little; Snow Falling on Cedars
2000	What Planet Are You From? What Lies Beneath; Hollow Man; Charlie's Angels; Cast Away
2001	Evolution (CGI flatworm animation sequence); America's Sweethearts; Riding in Cars with Boys; Harry Potter and the Sorcerer's Stone
2002	Spider-Man; Men in Black II; Stuart Little 2 The Tuxedo; I Spy; The Lord of the Rings: The Two Towers
2003	Darkness Falls; Anger Management; Identity (CGI digital color timing); The Matrix Reloaded; Hollywood Homicide; Charlie's Angels: Full Throttle; Bad Boys II; Seabiscuit; Matchstick Men; The Matrix Revolutions; The Haunted Mansion; Big Fish; Peter Pan
2004	50 First Dates; Spider-Man 2 Anchorman: The Legend of Ron Burgundy; Little Black Book; The Forgotten; The Polar Express; Christmas with the Kranks; The Aviator; Spanglish
2005	Cursed; Bewitched; The Prize Winner of Defiance, Ohio; Zathura; The Chronicles of Narnia: The Lion, the Witch and the Wardrobe
2006	Click; Superman Returns; Monster House; Open Season; Last Holiday
2007	Ghost Rider; Spider-Man 3 Surf's Up; Blade Runner: The Final Cut (CGI visual effects enhancement); The Jane Austen Book Club; Beowulf; I Am Legend
2008	Speed Racer; You Don't Mess with the Zohan; Hancock; Eagle Eye; Body of Lies; Valkyrie
2009	Jonas Brothers: The 3D Concert Experience; Watchmen; G-Force; Cloudy with a Chance of Meatballs; Michael Jackson's This Is It; 2012
2010	Alice in Wonderland; Cats & Dogs: The Revenge of Kitty Galore
2011	The Green Hornet; Just Go with It; Green Lantern; Zookeeper; The Smurfs; Arthur Christmas
2012	Men in Black 3 The Amazing Spider-Man; Hotel Transylvania; Here Comes the Boom
2013	Oz: The Great and Powerful; The Smurfs 2 Cloudy with a Chance of Meatballs 2
2014	Captain America: The Winter Soldier; The Amazing Spider-Man 2 Blended; Edge of Tomorrow; 22 Jump Street; Deliver Us from Evil; Guardians of the Galaxy; Fury; American Sniper; The Interview
2015	Pixels; Hotel Transylvania 2 Concussion
2016	The Angry Birds Movie; Alice Through the Looking Glass; Ghostbusters; Suicide Squad; Storks
2017	Smurfs: The Lost Village; Spider-Man: Homecoming; The Emoji Movie; Kingsman: The Golden Circle; Jumanji: Welcome to the Jungle
2018	Hotel Transylvania 3: Summer Vacation; The Meg; Smallfoot; Venom; Spider-Man: Into the Spider-Verse
2019	Men in Black: International; Spider-Man: Far From Home; The Angry Birds Movie 2 Zombieland: Double Tap (Columbia Pictures CGI opening variant only); Jumanji: The Next Level
2020	Mulan; Over the Moon
2021	The Mitchells vs. the Machines; Vivo; Spider-Man: No Way Home
2022	Hotel Transylvania: Transformania; Doctor Strange in the Multiverse of Madness; The Sea Beast; Thor: Love and Thunder
2023	Ant-Man and the Wasp: Quantumania; Guardians of the Galaxy Vol. 3 Spider-Man: Across the Spider-Verse; The Marvels
2024	Ghostbusters: Frozen Empire; Red One
2025	A Minecraft Movie; KPop Demon Hunters; The Fantastic Four: First Steps; The Bad Guys 2 In Your Dreams
2026	Goat; Project Hail Mary; Spider-Man: Brand New Day; Forgotten Island; Avengers: Doomsday; Jumanji: Open World
2027	Spider-Man: Beyond the Spider-Verse; The Haunting of Hotel Transylvania; Charlie vs. the Chocolate Factory

=== Short films ===
- The ChubbChubbs! (2002)
- Early Bloomer (2003)
- Boog and Elliot's Midnight Bun Run (2007)
- The Smurfs: A Christmas Carol (2011)
- The Smurfs: The Legend of Smurfy Hollow (2013)
- Super Manny (2013)
- Earl Scouts (2013)
- Puppy! (2017)
- Live Stream (2019)
- Monster Pets (2021)
- Dog Cop 7: The Final Chapter (2021)
- The Spider Within: A Spider-Verse Story (2024)

=== Television ===
- The Real Adventures of Jonny Quest ("The Edge of Yesterday")
- Stuart Little: The Animated Series (CGI animation and visual effects)
- Love, Death & Robots ("Lucky 13" and "In Vaulted Halls Entombed")
- The Falcon and the Winter Soldier ("One World, One People")
- The Guardians of the Galaxy Holiday Special (TV special)

== Controversy ==
In an article published by Vulture in June 2023, several animators quit Spider-Man: Across the Spider-Verse due to unstable working conditions. According to the Animation Guild, while SPI is associated with Sony Pictures Animation, SPI remains non-union.

== See also ==
- Sony Pictures Animation
- Pixomondo
- List of animation studios owned by Sony
