= List of unproduced Warner Bros. animated projects =

This is a list of unmade and unreleased animated projects by Warner Bros.. Some of these productions were, or still are, in development limbo. The following included animated feature films, short films and TV specials and shows that were made by Warner Bros.

== 1990s ==
=== 1992 ===
Series	Title	Description
Feature film	The Thief and the Cobbler	Following his success with Who Framed Roger Rabbit in 1988, Richard Williams and Warner Bros. negotiated a funding and a distribution deal for his long in-development feature, which included a $25 million marketing budget. The film was not finished by a 1991 deadline that Warner Bros. originally imposed upon Williams, and after a rough screening of the film in May 1992, the studio backed out of production entirely. The Completion Bond Company seized control of the film afterwards, where it would be overhauled and released under the title The Princess and the Cobbler in 1993.
DC Animated Universe	Catwoman: The Animated Series	After the success of Batman: The Animated Series, Bruce Timm was asked by Warner Bros. and Fox Kids to make a spin-off show, but with Catwoman. However, only a small amount of production work was done before the idea was scrapped in favor of Superman: The Animated Series.

=== 1993 ===
Series	Title	Description
Feature film	The Incredibles	In 1993, Brad Bird had sketched an idea of a family of superheroes during an uncertain point in his film career. During this time, Bird had signed a production deal with Turner Feature Animation, before folding into Warner Bros. Feature Animation and was in the process of directing his first feature, The Iron Giant and had pitched his idea for The Incredibles during production. However, after the box office failure of The Iron Giant, Bird gravitated toward his superhero story and pitched it to Pixar instead, and the film was released on November 5, 2004.
Feature film	Through the Horn	In 1993, David Kirschner, along with Turner Feature Animation developed a live-action/CGI-animated hybrid film Through the Horn, which is about a boy musician whose talents are silence after his teacher dies and his creative juices were revived after an encounter with an evil ruler of discord who outlaws music, but it never came to fruition in favor of Cats Don't Dance.
Feature film	October Moon	In 1993, Turner Feature Animation planned to adapt the book of the same name by Michael Scott Rohan about werewolves.

=== 1994 ===
Series	Title	Description
Feature film	Androcles	Modern Family writer Stephen Lloyd along with Jonathan Ehrlich (who would go to work on Hi Opie!) and Ann Carli of Crossroads and Fast Food Nation pitched an idea for an animated film version of the famous Roman folktale of Androcles with new songs by Michael Jackson for Warner Bros., but due to production problems going on at Warner Bros. Feature Animation, the film's production was shut down.
Feature film	King Tut	In 1994, Bill Kroyer, along with his studio Kroyer Films, was asked to co-produce Warner Bros. Animation's animated musical film of the early times of famous kid Egyptian Pharaoh Tutankhamun (also known as King Tut) with new songs by Prince, but nothing came through and the production was likely cancelled due to some arguments between Kroyer and Warner Bros. However, a few of the concepts later went into Jay Stephens' animated TV show version of his comic Tutenstein, and the rest would be used for the Warner Bros. Spanish animated movie Moomios.
Feature film	Marco Polo	Warner Bros. Feature Animation had plans to make an animated epic movie based on and inspired by the life and times of famous explorer Marco Polo. However the film's production was canceled due to high production costs.
DC Animated Universe	Teen Titans	Warner Bros. Animation originally considered producing an animated television series based on the Marv Wolfman, George Pérez and Arnold Drake comic book of the same name, but plans for it were cancelled, and an animated series unrelated to the DC animated universe was produced instead and aired simultaneously on Cartoon Network and Kids' WB from 2003 to 2006.
Feature film	The Snow Queen	Another animated film that was going to be directed by Bill Kroyer and produced by Kroyer Films for Warner Bros. Animation was in the works, this film was going to be based on The Snow Queen, but after heated arguments between Kroyer and Warner Bros. and Kroyer being fired from directing Quest for Camelot, production for The Snow Queen, along with King Tut and Arrow (an animated film fully made by Kroyer Films and distributed by Warner Bros.), was forced to be shut down.

=== 1995 ===
Series	Title	Description
Feature film	Untitled Day of the Dead film	In 1995, there were plans for an animated musical film centered around the Mexican Holiday of the same name with art work by Milton Knight and would predate famous Day of the Dead animated films like The Book of Life and Coco. The film was scrapped most likely due to the death of Selena, whom the filmmakers and songwriters greatly considered for a voice role before production started.
Feature film	Shangri-La	According to animator Michel Gagné's website. Warner Bros. Feature Animation had plans for an animated movie about a group of friends going on a quest to find the city of Shangri-La, after finding a map to it. However the film's production was shut down for unknown reasons.
Feature film	The Flying Dutchman (Warner version)	In 1995, writers Evelyn Gabai and Sandy Fries of Spider-Man: The Animated Series pitched an idea to Warner Bros. Feature Animation of an animated film of the ghost ship "The Flying Dutchman" with an prologue by David Bowie, but nothing came through and the production was shut down.
Feature film	Hiiaka, Daughter of the Volcano	In 1995, animation director Frederik Du Chau was going to make an animated musical film of the famous Hawaiian story Hiiaka, Daughter of the Volcano with a new song by Michael Franks. However, after Bill Kroyer was fired from directing Quest for Camelot and Frederik was brought to take over directing, the film's production was shut down immediately.
Feature film	Nicholas Cricket	In 1995, Storyopolis announced it was co-producing a musical animated film adaptation of the children's book Nicholas Cricket by Joyce Maxner and William Joyce with Warner Bros. In 1999, it was announced that Sandra Bullock's production company Fortis Films had extended its production deal with Warner Bros with Nicholas Cricket as one of its projects, and Karey Kirkpatrick was attached as screenwriter.
Feature film	The Sorcerer's Apprentice	Along with a series of announced projects, Storyopolis announced they were adapting the children's novel The Sorcerer's Apprentice by Nancy Willard. In January 1997, Geena Davis was cast to voice the female apprentice Sylvia and her production company, the Forge, was co-producing the film. Bill Marsilli was also attached to serve as the project's screenwriter.
Feature film	The Jester	Along with a series of announced projects, Storyopolis announced they were co-producing an animated film about a Jester going on a quest to save his kingdom and win the love of his life.
Feature film	The Iguana Brothers	Along with a series of announced projects, Storyopolis announced they were adapting the children's book The Iguana Brothers by Tony Johnston and Marc Teague. The story was to tell a road trip featuring two iguanas who travel to Rio de Janeiro for Carnival. The film was later moved to Blue Sky Studios only for that to be canceled as well.
Feature film	Ray Gunn	In late 1995 Brad Bird was in development of a film titled Ray Gunn under Turner Feature Animation, but due to the Turner-Time Warner merger the film was scrapped and Bird would later direct The Iron Giant. It was later announced in 2022 that the film would be made under Skydance Animation.
Feature film	Red Ranger Came Calling	Along with a series of announced projects, Storyopolis announced they were adapting the children's book, Red Ranger Came Calling by Berkeley Breathed, into a live-action/animated hybrid film.
Feature film	Wagstaffe the Wind-Up Boy	An animated adaption of Wagstaffe the Wind-Up Boy by Jan Needle, the story of a boy born with a wind-up key in his back, was in the works at Warner Bros. Animation, but was cancelled when the next project that was announced was The Iron Giant.
Feature film	The Flying Dutchman (Turner version)	In 1995, Turner Feature Animation and Colossal Pictures had signed a deal to produce its animated feature film that was slated for release, but this was cancelled. The script was written by Bob Dolman. Turner eventually put the project into turnaround when news heard Warner Bros. is doing a similar version and Colossal Pictures is filing Chapter 11 bankruptcy.

=== 1996 ===
Series	Title	Description
Feature film	Blue Moose	In 1996, an animated feature film adaptation of Blue Moose by children's book author Daniel Pinkwater of a cook named Mr. Breton (set to be voiced by Fred Melamed) gets help from a rare blue moose (set to be voiced by Rick Moranis) to make his restaurant even better was in the works at Warner Bros. Dan Aykroyd was also set to voice Mr. Bobowicz the game warden and Christopher Plummer was set to voice Dave the friendly, but shy forest hermit. However, it was cancelled when Warner Bros. decided to make Quest for Camelot as their next movie instead.
Feature film	Haunted Holiday	In 1996, animator Ralph Eggleston was set to direct his first animated feature film at Warner Bros. that was based on the famous ghost story Bluebeard called Haunted Holiday with Tim Curry as the voice of Baron Azuro, a character that was modeled after him. However the production was shut down after the failure of Quest for Camelot and Warner Bros. putting their money on The Iron Giant. After that, Ralph Eggleston left Warner Bros. Animation to return to Pixar in which he won an Academy Award for his short For the Birds.
Feature film	Untitled Mr. Limpet remake	In 1996, a live-action/animated hybrid remake of The Incredible Mr. Limpet was in development with a screenplay written by Space Jam writers Steve Rudnick and Leo Benvenuti. By 1997, Jim Carrey entered negotiations to star in the title role, and was confirmed in February 1998 with Steve Oedekerk hired as the writer and director. The star of the original film Don Knotts was aware of plans for the remake, which he wrote about in his autobiography, and offered his support. Roughly $10 million was spent on animation tests to digitally map Carrey's motion-captured human face onto a fish's body, which produced disastrous results. By March 1999, Oedekerk left the project following creative differences, while Carrey followed suit in July. In April 2000, Warner Bros. hired Beavis and Butt-Head and King of the Hill creator Mike Judge as director and co-writer, with Robin Williams, Chris Rock, Mike Myers, and Adam Sandler in consideration for the lead role. Filming was set to begin early 2001, but the project did not materialize for undisclosed reasons. In June 2009, it was announced that Enchanted director Kevin Lima was attached to direct. In 2010, it was reported that Zach Galifianakis was in talks for the lead role. In March 2011, Richard Linklater entered negotiations to helm the project, and was announced as the director in January 2014. That same month, Femke Wolting and Tommy Pallotta had begun working on the design and animation on the project while Galifianakis would reportedly play the lead character. On July 8, 2014, it was announced that Jon Hamm, Danny McBride, Sarah Silverman, Kevin Hart, Josh Gad, Keegan-Michael Key, and Jordan Peele had entered talks for various roles in the film. On August 4, Linklater left the project to concentrate on his next film That's What I'm Talking About (released in 2016 as Everybody Wants Some!!).
Feature film	Wolf	In 1995-1996, the film was slated to be in development at Turner Feature Animation, to be written by Denis O'Neil and directed by Dan Jeup and Doug Frankl, but cancelled due to the merger.

=== 1998 ===
Series	Title	Description
Batman	Batman: Arkham	After the success of Batman & Mr. Freeze: Subzero, Warner Bros. greenlighted the production of a third installment, entitled Batman: Arkham. Boyd Kirkland, the director of this film, was attached to write and direct. The film would have Batman and Robin facing off against a collection of Arkham Asylum escapees, in addition to Batman finding himself falling in love with a new love interest, planned to be voiced by Angie Harmon. The main cast of Batman: The Animated Series was attached to reprise their roles. Steven E. Gordon also drew some art concept for the film. However, the film was cancelled in favor of Batman Beyond: Return of the Joker (which also featured Harmon), while Batman: Arkham eventually became a successful video game series by Rocksteady.
Feature film	Sho and the Demons of the Deep	In 1998, Warner Bros. Animation pitched an idea for an animated film based on Sho and the Demons of the Deep by Annouchka Gravel Galouchko about a story set in ancient Japan of how kites came to be. However the project was cancelled after no news came and problems at Warner Bros. Feature Animation.
Willy Wonka	WONKA	A planned animated adaptation of the Roald Dahl book Charlie and the Chocolate Factory was in the planning stages, but was never made.
Feature film	The Zoo	According to animator Alex Williams, Warner Bros. Feature Animation had plans to do an animated anthology film called The Zoo about the days, lives and shenanigans of the animals living in the same zoo. However, it was canceled after Quest for Camelot did not do to well at the box office.
Quest for Camelot	The Green Knight and King Arthur's Daughter	Sequels to Quest for Camelot that were based on the books The Green Knight and King Arthur's Daughter by Vera Chapman were in the works at Warner Bros. However, after Quest for Camelot became a commercial and critical failure, the sequels' productions were shut down immediately.

== 2000s ==
Due to the box office underperformance of Back in Action, most planned Looney Tunes projects at the time were cancelled.

=== 2000 ===
Series	Title	Description
Batman	Untitled Batman Beyond: Return of the Joker sequel	A second Batman Beyond movie was planned for release, but was finally scrapped due to the dark tones and controversies of Batman Beyond: Return of the Joker back in the year 2000.

=== 2003 ===
Series	Title	Description
Batman	Untitled Catwoman film	Around 2003, during the production of Batman: Mystery of the Batwoman, Warner Bros. approached Boyd Kirkland to write a Catwoman direct-to-video feature film as a tie-in with the 2004 live-action film. Although the script was written, the project was soon scrapped after the poor reception of the live-action film.
Looney Tunes	Skate Jam	In 2003, Warner Bros. had approached professional skater Tony Hawk to star in a live action/animated hybrid film with the Looney Tunes, the project was shelved after the failure of Looney Tunes Back in Action. However, in 2021, Warner Bros later released a sequel titled Space Jam: A New Legacy starring NBA athlete LeBron James.
Looney Tunes	Looney Tunes theatrical shorts	In 2003, Warner Bros. Animation had plans to return to making Looney Tunes shorts, produced by Larry Doyle. But the box office failure of Looney Tunes: Back in Action, prevented several short projects from happening, despite the film's positive reception.
Geronimo Stilton	Untitled Geronimo Stilton film	In 2002, the film rights to Geronimo Stilton were secured by Warner Bros. Despite the announcement, no further details seemed to have come out. Same with later attempts and the current Radar Pictures affair.

=== 2004 ===
Series	Title	Description
Justice League	Justice League: Worlds Collide	Around 2004, Bruce Timm announced that a direct-to-video Justice League feature film was in the works. The film was intended to make a bridge between the second season of Justice League to the first season of Justice League Unlimited. The film was planned to reveal how Wonder Woman acquired her Invisible-Jet, and also planned to feature the Crime Syndicate as the main antagonists, an idea that was originally conceived for the two-part episode "A Better World", until the Syndicate was replaced by the Justice Lords. Dwayne McDuffie wrote the script and Andrea Romano assembled the cast, but Warner Bros. finally scrapped the project. However, in 2010, the film's plot was used for the non-DCAU film Justice League: Crisis on Two Earths, but removing all references to the continuity of the DC Animated Universe, and replacing John Stewart with Hal Jordan as the Justice League's Green Lantern.
Batman	Batman: No Man's Land	In the mid-2000s, producer James Tucker wanted to make a traditional animated television adaptation of Batman: No Man's Land with designs by Coran Stone, but its production was shut down when Warner Bros. Animation found it too dark for television. Later, a second attempt to make a television adaptation was in the works during the late 2000s, but with CGI. However, like their earlier attempt, Warner Bros. found it too dark and violent for television.

=== 2005 ===
Series	Title	Description
Feature film	Neopets	In March 2005, it was announced that Warner Bros. had closed a deal to produce an animated film based on Neopets. In February 2006, it was announced that Rob Lieber was hired to write the screenplay. Jimmy Neutron creator John A. Davis was attached as director along with Dylan Seller as producer. However, the project was later cancelled.

=== 2006 ===
Series	Title	Description
Batman	The Batman vs. Hush	A second movie of The Batman titled The Batman vs. Hush that featured Hush as the main villain along with the Joker, the Penguin, the Riddler, Catwoman, and Clayface was planned for a long time. However, the film ended up being scrapped. Before its cancellation, producer Alan Burnett had hopes of making one or two more DTV movies based on The Batman. However, a film based on Batman: Hush was released in 2019 as part of the DC Animated Movie Universe.
Superman	Untitled Superman spinoff series	In June 2006, during an interview about Superman: Brainiac Attacks, writer Duane Capizzi mentioned a Superman series set in the same universe of The Batman, a possibility supported by Superman's revealed existence during the show's fifth season.

=== 2007 ===
Series	Title	Description
Feature film	C. Horse	There were plans for an animated film titled C Horse about a free spirited sports athlete seahorse voiced by Vince Vaughn learning to be a father of hundreds of offspring. It was pitched by Jimmy Neutron creator John A. Davis, with Mike Gasaway as director and Jessie Nelson as writer. DNA Productions was going to handle the animation. However, the project was later cancelled, likely due to DNA’s closure the previous year.

=== 2008 ===
Series	Title	Description
Justice League	Untitled Justice League film	An untitled Justice League direct to DVD film was in the works in 2008, with a design by James Tucker.
The Tiger's Apprentice	The Tiger's Apprentice	In October 2008, Cartoon Network announced the live-action animated television film adaptation of the Laurence Yep's 2003 novel The Tiger's Apprentice with a script by David Magee with Rainmaker Entertainment contracted for the animation. The project was cancelled after Cartoon Network stopped developing live-action projects. In March 2019, Paramount Animation announced the development of an animated film adaptation, which was released on Paramount+ on February 2, 2024 after the film was originally planned for theatrical release and being delayed several times due to the COVID-19 pandemic.
Green Lantern	Untitled Green Lantern: First Flight sequel	There were plans to make a sequel to Green Lantern: First Flight, but nothing came about due to poor DVD sales.
Looney Tunes and Hanna-Barbera	Mixed Nutz	Tom Ruegger pitched an idea for a TV show where the Looney Tunes and Hanna-Barbera characters have crossovers together in different stories and parodies, but the series was scrapped when the executives found it too disorienting combining both franchises together.

=== 2009 ===
Series	Title	Description
Batman	Gotham High	In 2009, an animated series that re-imagined the Batman characters as high school students was in development. But was scrapped for unknown reasons.
Hanna-Barbera	Hong Kong Phooey	On July 12, 2009, it was announced that David A. Goodman had been hired to write the screenplay for a live-action/animated Hong Kong Phooey film to be released by Warner Bros. Pictures. Alex Zamm was slated to direct, and Broderick Johnson, Andrew Kosove, Brett Ratner, and Jay Stern were identified as producers. According to the announcement, Alcon Entertainment would back the film. It was announced on August 10, 2011, that Eddie Murphy would be voicing Hong Kong Phooey in the film. On December 28, 2012, test footage of the film was leaked, showing a computer-generated character in live-action scenery. As of April 2025, no further information has been revealed since, and the film has likely been cancelled.

== 2010s ==
=== 2010 ===
Series	Title	Description
Wonder Woman	Untitled Wonder Woman sequel	There were plans to make a sequel to the 2009 direct-to-video film Wonder Woman. It was cancelled due to poor DVD sales.
Aquaman	Untitled Aquaman film	An animated film based on Aquaman was first mentioned by Bruce Timm in 2010, but it was cancelled due to marketing concerns. In December 2013, filmmaker Adam Green stated he had written a screenplay for the project.
Batman	Nightwing: The Animated Series	An animated series featuring Nightwing was in development from Ki Hyun Ryu of The Boondocks and The Legend of Korra fame. The series was rejected in favor of Young Justice.
Looney Tunes	Pepé Le Pew	On October 2010, it was reported that Warner Bros. was producing a live-action/CGI film centered on the Looney Tunes character Pepé Le Pew. Mike Myers was slated to voice the character. In 2016, Max Landis told San Diego Comic-Con that he was writing the script for the film. The movie was cancelled due to sexual assault allegations against Landis in 2017, as well as Warner Bros decisions to not include Pepe Le Pew in future productions since 2021.

=== 2011 ===
Series	Title	Description
Batman	Batgirl: Year One	Batman: Year One's executive producer Bruce Timm and co-director Lauren Montgomery expressed interest in producing an animated movie based on Batgirl: Year One., but DC cancelled all plans for an adaptation.
The Flintstones	Untitled Flintstones reboot series	In May 2011, Family Guy and American Dad! creator Seth MacFarlane was hired by Warner Bros. Animation to make an adult animated reboot of The Flintstones. The series was projected to premiere in fall 2013. MacFarlane was slated to voice Barney Rubble and other roles, while Jeff Bergman and Tress MacNeille were set to reprise their voice roles as Fred Flintstone and Wilma Flintstone and Patti LuPone was in the talks to voice Pearl Slaghoople. However, the project was placed on hold due to MacFarlane being busy directing A Million Ways to Die in the West and arguments between him and the studio. On March 12, 2021, storyboards of what the show would be like were revealed on the show's storyboard artist Andy Clark's website.

=== 2012 ===
Series	Title	Description
Feature film	Bolivar	In March 2012, Warner Bros. announced they had optioned Sean Rubin's upcoming graphic novel Bolivar for an intended animated feature film. Irish filmmaker Kealan O'Rourke has been attached to write and direct the project. Akiva Goldsman and Kerry Foster were to produce the film through their Weed Road company. However, in April 2018, 20th Century Fox Animation announced they had acquired the rights to the book. Although, Blue Sky Studios did shut down on April 10, 2021.

=== 2014 ===
Series	Title	Description
Harold & Kumar	Harold and Kumar: The Animated Series	In 2014, Warner Bros. Animation and New Line Cinema both announced that Adult Swim picked up Harold and Kumar: The Animated Series, which was based on the titular film trilogy, and this was confirmed by Kal Penn, David Krumholtz, and Jon Hurwitz. However, it was never produced.

=== 2015 ===
Series	Title	Description
Adventure Time	Untitled Adventure Time film	In February 2015, a film based on the Cartoon Network animated series Adventure Time reportedly entered development. Adventure Time creator Pendleton Ward was set to write and executive-produce, with Chris McKay and Roy Lee producing the film. It would have been a collaboration between Warner Animation Group, Cartoon Network Studios, Vertigo Entertainment, and Frederator Films. In October 2015, Adventure Time producer Adam Muto said that Pendleton was developing the film's premise, but stated that there was "nothing official to announce yet". In July 2018, he said that the film was never "officially announced", and in later that August, he stated that the series' finale would not affect development on a potential movie nor would it lead to it, but noted that "all the lore and stuff would not work for a first time viewer", and so, it would need to work on its own to be successful.
Lego	The Billion Brick Race	In March 2015, Warner Bros. announced that a third Lego Movie spin-off, titled The Billion Brick Race was in development. Jason Segel and Drew Pearce were signed on to co-direct and write the film. On August 2, 2017, it was announced that Jorge R. Gutierrez had signed on as director, with Pearce stepping down. At that time, the film was scheduled to be released on May 24, 2019, but on February 8, 2018, it was announced that Gutierrez had left the project. Following the box office underperformance of The Lego Movie 2: The Second Part, the franchise moved to Universal Pictures on December 20, 2019.
The Beatles	Meet The Beatles	In September 2015, an animated musical film based on the Beatles was announced to be in development at Warner Animation Group with Paul King in talks to direct.

=== 2016 ===
Series	Title	Description
Feature film	Bone	On November 17, 2016, it was announced that Warner Animation Group was adapting Jeff Smith's comic series Bone into an animated film with Mark Osborne to direct it. However, in October 2019, it was announced the project had been sold to Netflix to become a television series, which was later cancelled in April 2022 due to a reorganization at Netflix Animation.
Feature film	Fowl Road	In February 2016, it was announced that Nicholas Stoller was attached to direct an animated film titled Fowl Road. The project was to be a satirical premise about a chicken and a hen who must cross a super highway to save their daughter from a fried chicken company, which would be a take on the "Why did the chicken cross the road?" joke.
The Lego Movie	Contagious	Two additional shorts for theatrical distribution were in production alongside The Master in 2016: Contagious directed by Patrick Osbourne, and Emmet Amuck directed by Jon Saunders and Ross Evans. Both ultimately went unreleased.
The Lego Movie	Emmet Amuck	Two additional shorts for theatrical distribution were in production alongside The Master in 2016: Contagious directed by Patrick Osbourne, and Emmet Amuck directed by Jon Saunders and Ross Evans. Both ultimately went unreleased.

=== 2017 ===
Series	Title	Description
Wonder Woman	Wonder Woman: World War II animated series	Producer Butch Lukic brought a proposal to Warner Bros. for Wonder Woman animated series set in the World War II, but was rejected due to the development of the live-action film Wonder Woman, which is set in the World War I. Some of the concepts for the story and setting were later incorporated in the animated film Justice Society: World War II, which was produced by Lukic.

=== 2018 ===
Series	Title	Description
Feature film	The Ice Dragon	In May 2018, an animated film adaptation on the George R.R. Martin novel was in the works, but nothing has materialized since.
Feature film	Toto	In July 2018, Warner Animation Group announced they would produce an animated film based on the book. In February 2021, animation studio Animal Logic announced that Toto would be their next project, and it would be a musical adaption of the book. Alex Timbers was tapped to direct the feature; John August was brought on board as the screenwriter; Jared Stern would serve as executive producer, and Derek Frey would produce the film. The film was originally scheduled to be theatrically released on February 2, 2024 in the United States. On April 5, 2023, it was pushed off the 2024 release schedule with The Alto Knights taking over its original release date, which also moved off that date by October 2023. On June 28, 2025, animator Uli Meyer posted on Instagram - the later-edited post reading "A few years ago I worked on a project that was tremendous fun. A lot of talented artists were involved. It was one of those where you throw hundreds of designs into the pot and everything is great but nothing is ever followed up. Then it suddenly stopped. The people you were talking to on a weekly basis were never heard from again. Recently, many years later, I heard that the project is dead. Many of us have been there and for me this isn't the only one." Character designer Tona Grasa replied to the post the same day, saying that he "worked on this project along some amazing designers at Animal Logic after this. We were on this rollercoaster of a dream project for about two years until the project got put "on hold". We were always in awe of what all you wonderful artists did for the reproduction! A real shame the project will never see the light of day.", later replying to his reply with "preproduction" the same day.
Superman	Untitled Superman Family animated series	In May 2018, Vinton Heuck and Sean Galloway pitched an idea for a Superman Family animated series to Warner Bros. Animation but the pitch was rejected in favor of Harley Quinn. The characters would have included Kong Kenan, Jon Kent, Damian Wayne, Mister Mxyzptlk, and Natasha Irons/Steel, among others.
Lego	Lego Superfriends	In December 2018, Chris McKay confirmed that a sequel to The Lego Batman Movie was in development and that he would return to direct the film. However, the film was canceled due to Warner Bros. losing the Lego film rights to Universal after The Lego Movie 2: The Second Part underperformed at the box office. In 2021, McKay revealed that the script was being written by Michael Waldron and Dan Harmon. It would have focused on Batman's relationship with the Justice League, particularly Superman, and the main villains would have been Lex Luthor and OMAC.

=== 2019 ===
Series	Title	Description
Feature film	Funko	An animated film based on the Funko toys was reported to be in development at Warner Animation Group in January 2019. The film was announced as being in active development on September 16, 2019, with Lloyd Taylor set to write the script, Teddy Newton set to create the story, and Mark Dindal set to direct. However, nothing has materialized since.
Feature film	That Christmas	In November 2019, it was announced that Locksmith Animation was developing That Christmas, an animated feature based on a series of Richard Curtis-penned children's books. It was originally expected to be released by Warner Bros. under its Warner Animation Group banner, but was taken over by Netflix in June 2022, when the company had unveiled it as part of its slate of animated films, and was released on December 4, 2024.
Looney Tunes	Tooned Out	On October 29, 2019, at the HBO Max launch event, it was announced that a live-action/animated television series titled Tooned Out, featuring Looney Tunes characters, was in development at Warner Bros. Animation and ImageMovers and was scheduled to release on the then-upcoming WarnerMedia streaming service. Robert Zemeckis and Jared Stern were set to write the series. There have been no official updates since.
Feature film	Zero	In 2019, Ron Howard was set to direct an animated feature for Warner Animation Group in co-junction with Animal Logic and his production company Imagine Entertainment.

== 2020s ==
=== 2020 ===
Series	Title	Description
Tom and Jerry	Tom and Jerry Time	On June 4, 2020, co-creative director of the show's visual style, Genevieve Tsai uploaded concept art of characters to social media. WarnerMedia Kids & Family announced on February 17, 2021, that they were developing the show. On September 3, 2021, ten days before Cartoonito's launch, the show's name was changed from its working title to Tom and Jerry Time. The show was to premiere in 2022, but was changed to 2023. On Twitter, Warner Bros. Discovery announced on September 8, 2022, that they will also invest in animated children's programs, which would include Tom and Jerry Time among other animated shows. The future WBD platform also invested in animated programming. In July 2023, Will Finn confirmed on social media that the show was axed by Warner Bros. Discovery CEO David Zaslav.

=== 2021 ===
Series	Title	Description
Teen Titans Go!	Untitled The Night Begins to Shine series	In February 2021, a spinoff of Teen Titans Go! based on The Night Begins to Shine episodes was announced for Cartoon Network. No updates have occurred since.
Looney Tunes	Tweety Mysteries	In February 2021, a live-action-CGI hybrid Looney Tunes series, Tweety Mysteries, centered on journalist and podcaster Sydney as she solves mysteries with Tweety Bird. However, the series was cancelled alongside other live-action series in December 2022.
Television series	Wings of Fire	In April 2021, film director Ava DuVernay confirmed that she would executive produce an animated TV series adaptation of the Wings of Fire novel series with both Warner Bros. Animation and Netflix Animation. However, plans for the show have been canceled due to problems going on at Netflix.
DC Animated Universe	Smallville animated series	In 2021, Tom Welling and Smallville co-star Michael Rosenbaum were developing an animated series revival to the series and wanted to "use as many of the original cast members as possible". He and Rosenbaum prepared a pitch of the series for Warner Bros., and they delivered to them in January 2022. John Glover, Sam Jones III, Kristin Kreuk, Erica Durance, and original series showrunners Alfred Gough and Miles Millar were said to return, with the exception of Allison Mack due to sex trafficking charges made against her for which she was convicted and imprisoned. No production updates were provided following the initial announcements.

=== 2022 ===
Series	Title	Description
Scooby-Doo	Scoob! Holiday Haunt	A prequel to the 2020 film Scoob!, directed by Bill Haller and Michael Kurinsky, was originally intended for release on HBO Max, but the film's release was cancelled following the merger of WarnerMedia and Discovery, Inc. to form Warner Bros. Discovery by CEO David Zaslav in August 2022, despite its production being 95% complete.
Looney Tunes	Bye Bye Bunny: A Looney Tunes Musical	In June 2022, it was officially announced that production had begun on a new Looney Tunes musical comedy film under the name "Bye Bye Bunny: A Looney Tunes Musical" for Cartoon Network and HBO Max. The film would follow "An exhausted Bugs Bunny decides it's time to trade in sold-out shows for life as a regular rabbit. Ever the spotlight opportunist, Daffy Duck attempts to step into the lead role, but his star ambitions are quickly sidetracked when he is kidnapped by an obsessive fan who has more sinister plans for her favorite stage duck". In August 2022, it was reported that the film would not be moving forward on HBO Max and would be shopped to other streaming services. In September 2022, it was reported that the most of the film's production team was laid off as it was being retooled into a full-fledged musical. In January 2026, TheWrap reported that the film was quietly canceled in 2024, but that Warner Bros. Animation was looking to "revisit the concept" in the near future. In October 2026, it was reported that the film had restarted pre-production prior to Eric Bauza's death.

=== 2023 ===
Series	Title	Description
Scooby-Doo	Scooby-Doo! and the Mystery Pups	A cancelled project that would have been the fifteenth incarnation of the Scooby-Doo franchise. The series was animated and was an educational show made for preschool children. It was produced by Warner Bros. Animation and would have premiered on Max through Cartoon Network's Cartoonito block in 2024.
Scooby-Doo	Scooby-Doo! and the Haunted High Rise	A cancelled project in a series of direct-to-video films based upon Hanna-Barbera's Scooby-Doo Saturday morning cartoons. It was to be released back-to-back with Scooby-Doo! and Krypto, Too! in fall 2023.

== See also ==
- Warner Bros. Animation
- Warner Bros. Pictures Animation
- List of Warner Bros. Animation productions
- List of unproduced DC projects
- List of unproduced Universal Pictures animated projects
