= The ChubbChubbs! =

2002 American animated short film by Eric Armstrong

- Poster
- Directed by: Eric Armstrong
- Written by: Jeff Wolverton
- Produced by: Jacquie Barnbook
- Starring: Bradford Simonsen; Jeff Wolverton; Eric Armstrong; Mortonette Jenkins; Peter Lurie; Rick Zieff
- Edited by: Robert Gordon
- Music by: Chance Thomas
- Production company: Sony Pictures Imageworks
- Distributed by: Sony Pictures Releasing
- Release date: July 3, 2002 (with Men in Black II)
- Running time: 5 minutes
- Country: United States
- Language: English

The ChubbChubbs! is a 2002 American animated short film by Sony Pictures Imageworks. It was directed by Eric Armstrong, produced by Jacquie Barnbrook, and written by Jeff Wolverton.

The ChubbChubbs! won the Academy Award for Best Animated Short Film in 2003.

== Plot ==
Meeper, the janitor of an alien pub called the Ale-E-Inn, has higher aspirations—a karaoke performer. After he accidentally electrocutes a singer, he is ejected from the pub. Outside, he is told by an incautious Gungan that "The ChubbChubbs are coming!" Meeper sees aircraft land in the distance, and huge, weapon-bearing monsters exit the craft. He assumes these are the ChubbChubbs.

Meeper rushes to warn the pub, and some chicks he finds pecking at the ground outside, but each of his attempts further injures the singer. Once the patrons are finally warned by a different visitor, the pub is promptly emptied due to said patrons taking off in panic, leaving Meeper behind during the process. When the monsters begin closing in to the pub, Meeper hides four chicks under his bucket in an attempt to save them. He then launches into a rendition of "Why Can't We Be Friends?" until, caught up in the song, he accidentally trips over the bucket, revealing the chicks. The monsters flee, screaming, "It's the ChubbChubbs!" The chicks reveal their razor sharp teeth and devour the monsters, who are actually known as Zyzaks. They gather around Meeper, who says, "So... You guys into karaoke?"

As the credits roll, Meeper and the ChubbChubbs sing a rewrite of Aretha Franklin's "Respect" in the pub. When the song is finished, there is dead silence. The ChubbChubbs glare and reveal their teeth in a sense of threat, and the crowd hastily bursts into applause.

== Cast ==
- Brad Simonsen as Meeper
- Jeff Wolverton as the ChubbChubbs
- Mortonette Jenkins as Singing Diva
- Peter Lurie as Zyzaks
- Rick Zieff as Bouncer
- Dustin Adair, Eric Armstrong, Yakov Baytler, Mary Biondo, Sumit Das, Layne Friedman, Robert Gordon, Sully Jacome-Wilkes, Franco Pietrantonio, Rick Richards, Chance Thomas, Julie Zackary as Glorfs
- Evan Wu as various aliens

== Production ==
The short was "originally conceived as a pipeline test to help determine the studio's strengths and weaknesses in producing all-CGI animation within the Sony Pictures Imageworks production environment".

== Release ==
The ChubbChubbs! was theatrically released on July 3, 2002, along with Men in Black II.

The short got a DVD release on November 26, 2002, as a bonus feature also attached to Men in Black II. The short was also included on the release of the puzzle game Frantix for the PlayStation Portable which also included Meeper as a playable character. On April 11, 2003, the short was released on its own DVD, and with a running time of 5 minutes and 37 seconds is considered likely the briefest DVD ever released. The ChubbChubbs! and its sequel The ChubbChubbs Save Xmas were released on October 9, 2007, for the first time on Blu-ray, attached as a bonus to Surf's Up.

== Accolades ==
| Year | Award | Category | Result | Ref. |
|---|---|---|---|---|
| 2002 | Academy Awards | Best Animated Short Film | Won | |
| 2002 | BAFTAs | Best Short Animation | Nominated | |

== Cancelled adaptations ==
A feature-length animated film and a television series based on the short were in development in 2003 at Sony Pictures Animation. Dan Wilson and Dave Gilbreth were hired to write the film's screenplay, but since then, there has been no further news about the projects.

== Sequel ==
A sequel, The ChubbChubbs Save Xmas, was theatrically released on August 8, 2007, along with TriStar Pictures' Daddy Day Camp, reissued with Surf's Up, and was produced by Columbia Pictures and Sony Pictures Animation.

== See also ==
- 2002 in film
- List of fictional aliens
