= List of unproduced Universal Pictures animated projects =

This is a list of unmade and unreleased animated projects by Universal Pictures. Some of these projects were, or still are, in development limbo. These also include the co-productions the studio collaborated with in the past (i.e. Amblimation, Universal Animation Studios, Illumination, and DreamWorks Animation) as well as sequels to their franchises and one-off films.

== 1940s ==
=== 1941 ===
| Series | Title | Description |
|---|---|---|
| Feature film | Aladdin and His Lamp | In 1941, after hearing the success of Disney's Snow White and the Seven Dwarfs, Universal's first animation studio Walter Lantz Productions was given $750,000 to produce their first feature film called Aladdin and His Lamp, which was based on the famous tales of Aladdin. It was set to star the voices of comedy duo Abbott and Costello, and Frank Churchill was set to compose the musical score. However, Walter Lantz cancelled the project in light of the cut-off of the overseas market and the financial risk that came shortly after the Fleischer Studios' film Mr. Bug Goes to Town failed at the box office. |

== 1990s ==
=== 1991 ===
| Series | Title | Description |
|---|---|---|
| Shrek | Shrek | In 1991, Steven Spielberg purchased the rights to William Steig's 1990 children's book Shrek!. Spielberg originally envisioned his adaptation as a traditionally animated film through his animation studio Amblimation, with Bill Murray as the voice of the titular character and Steve Martin as the voice of Donkey. Despite co-founding DreamWorks Animation—the eventual owner of the Shrek franchise—in 1994, three years before Amblimation ceased operations, Spielberg moved on to other projects. This film is starring Mike Myers, Eddie Murphy and Cameron Diaz and turned into a CGI film when it was completed and released in 2001. |
| Feature film and television series | The Adventures of MC Skat Kat and the Stray Mob | Following the release of the album of the same name, Virgin Music and Universal Pictures briefly discussed producing a live-action/animation feature film featuring MC Skat Kat, but nothing ever materialized. Singer Paula Abdul had even pitched the idea of a live-action/animation series starring Skat Kat to air on Fox Kids, but it failed to materialize due to the poor reviews and sales of the album. |

=== 1993 ===
| Series | Title | Description |
|---|---|---|
| Jurassic Park | Escape from Jurassic Park | In June 1993, after the theatrical release of Jurassic Park, spokesmen for Amblin and MCA confirmed that an animated series based on the film was in development and awaiting Steven Spielberg's final approval. The series, titled Escape from Jurassic Park, would have consisted of 23 episodes for its first season. The series would have centered on John Hammond's attempts to finish Jurassic Park and open it to the public, while InGen's corporate rival Biosyn is simultaneously planning to open their own dinosaur theme park in Brazil, which ultimately ends with their dinosaurs escaping into the jungles. |

=== 1996 ===
| Series | Title | Description |
|---|---|---|
| Feature film | Cats | By October 1996, an animated adaptation of the Andrew Lloyd Webber musical Cats was in development at Amblimation. Phil Nibbelink and Dick Zondag were attached to direct while Joel Cohen and Alec Sokolow were brought on to rework an earlier script from Tom Stoppard. The film was turned into the critical and commercial failure version of the same name with Tom Hooper directing. |
| Casper the Friendly Ghost | Casper 2 | Following the release of Casper, Simon Wells co-wrote a screenplay for Casper 2, in which he was set to direct, but in July 2000, Universal Pictures cancelled the sequel due to the disappointing sales from the direct-to-video Casper films and the hesitation of Christina Ricci. |
| Scooby-Doo | Scooby-Doo | The film was planned to be an origin story of Scooby, Shaggy and the Mystery Inc. gang. It was written by Craig Titley who later went on to write the 2002 film of the same name. The film was scrapped when Warner Bros. bought the rights to Hanna-Barbera by buying Turner in 1996. The script for this version of the film was leaked in 2014. |

=== 1997 ===
| Series | Title | Description |
|---|---|---|
| Alvin and the Chipmunks | Alvin and the Chipmunks | In June 1997, director Robert Zemeckis was slated to direct a live-action adaptation of Alvin and the Chipmunks, but in September 2000, the estate of Ross Bagdasarian Sr. filed suit against Universal Pictures for which development on the film was cancelled. A live-action/CGI film was ultimately released by 20th Century Fox in 2007. |
| Feature film | Just So Stories | This project from Amblimation and Universal back in the 1990s was Just So Stories based on the book by Rudyard Kipling. Amblimation did only 3 films such as An American Tail: Fievel Goes West (1991), We're Back! A Dinosaur's Story (1993), and Balto (1995) but never released Just So Stories and the animated musical adaptation of Cats as the studio closed its doors in 1997 and everyone involved moved on to DreamWorks. The other animation studios of Just So Stories are Soyuzmultfilm, Marble Arch/Interama/Strengholt Films, Bevanfield Films, Les Films de l'Arlequin and Je Suis Bien Content. |
| Feature film | Carnival | An animated musical by Amblimation that was announced but scrapped when the studio closed it's doors in 1997. |
| Feature film | Crazy Dogs | This project from Amblimation and Universal back in the 1990s was described as a wild west native american story. It was cancelled due to the studio shutting down in 1997. |
| Jurassic Park | Jurassic Park: Chaos Effect | Part three of the four-part comic adaptation of The Lost World: Jurassic Park, published by Topps Comics in July 1997, confirmed to readers that a cartoon series based on the film was in development. The animated series was commissioned by Steven Spielberg and was to be developed by DreamWorks Animation under the supervision of Steve Lyons. The cartoon was to be accompanied by Jurassic Park: Chaos Effect, a series of dinosaur toys produced by Kenner and based on a premise that scientists had created dinosaur hybrids consisting of DNA from different creatures. The new toys were based on the then-upcoming cartoon. The cartoon was scheduled for release date of March 1998, as a mid-season replacement. The Chaos Effect toyline was released in June 1998, but the animated series was never produced, for unknown reasons. |

=== 1998 ===
| Series | Title | Description |
|---|---|---|
| Feature film | Frankenstein | In October 1998, Universal Pictures and Industrial Light & Magic jointly announced to produce a computer-animated film featuring Frankenstein. S. S. Wilson and Brent Maddock were attached to write the script under the condition that it would not be a family-oriented film. Tom Bertino was attached to direct the film. It was intended to be released by Halloween 2000. |

== 2000s ==
=== 2001 ===
| Series | Title | Description |
|---|---|---|
| Feature film | Where the Wild Things Are | Universal acquired rights to the book's adaptation in 2001 and initially attempted to develop a computer-animated adaptation with Disney animator Eric Goldberg, but in 2003 the animated concept was replaced with a live-action one, and Goldberg was replaced with Spike Jonze. The film was originally set for release from Universal, and a teaser of the film was attached to the studio's 2000 adaptation of How the Grinch Stole Christmas. Disagreements between Universal and Sendak over Jonze's approach to the story led to a turnaround arrangement where the film's production was transferred to Warner Bros., resulting in the live-action adaptation released in October 2009. |

=== 2006 ===
| Series | Title | Description |
|---|---|---|
| Feature film | Jack & Ben's Animated Adventure | When Laika Entertainment opened, they announced their first projects, the stop-motion film Coraline, and the CGI animated film Jack & Ben's Animated Adventure. The studio laid off a significant portion of its staff in 2008, when its second planned feature was cancelled. |

=== 2007 ===
| Series | Title | Description |
|---|---|---|
| Feature film | The Legend of Spyro 3D | By September 2007, the film rights for Spyro the Dragon were purchased by The Animation Picture Company. Daniel and Steven Altiere wrote the script, which was going to be based on the recently released The Legend of Spyro trilogy. The film was going to be titled The Legend of Spyro 3D and was planned to be made from Los Angeles, California, with animation by a South Korean Animation studio, Wonderworld Studios, alongside Universal Animation Studios. The film was planned to be produced by John Davis, Dan Chuba, Mark A.Z. Dippé, Brian Manis and Ash Shah, and distributed and advertised by Velvet Octopus along with Universal Studios. Mark Dippe was going to direct the film, which would have made it the first theatrical film Dippe directed since Spawn. This film was originally planned for release in theaters on Christmas 2009 in the United States and Canada, but was delayed to April 10, 2010, for its North American release. It was later confirmed by Daniel Altiere himself that the film had been officially cancelled due to decisions made by Activision to go in a different direction, which was later revealed to be in the form of Skylanders. |

=== 2008 ===
| Series | Title | Description |
|---|---|---|
| Feature film | Emily the Strange | Since 2000, Rob Reger has been trying to make a feature film adaptation of Emily. In 2005, Fox Animation went to make a live action/animated feature film, with Chris Meledandri and John Cohen producing it. Mike Richardson, of Dark Horse Entertainment, came on board as a producer in 2008. The same year it was unofficially reported that the film moved to Universal Studios' owned Illumination Entertainment, along with the studio's founders, Meledandri and Cohen. In September 2010, Universal Studios acquired the rights to the comic, and the actress Chloë Grace Moretz was cast in the role of Emily. Melisa Wallack, who wrote the script for Mirror Mirror, was hired to write the adaptation in the following year in August. Two months later it was confirmed that the film was indeed in the works at Illumination Entertainment. Kealan O'Rourke was brought to rewrite the film's script. By December 2016, Universal abandoned the project, and Dark Horse Entertainment and Amazon Studios were in negotiations to make an animated film. |

=== 2009 ===
| Series | Title | Description |
|---|---|---|
| Feature film | Flanimals | An animated feature film based on the Flanimals book series was in production at Illumination by April 2009. Series creator Ricky Gervais was set to be the executive producer and also lend his voice to the lead character, while The Simpsons writer Matt Selman wrote the script, but the project was later removed from the development schedule. |
| Where's Waldo? | Where's Waldo? | In June 2009, Universal and Illumination Entertainment acquired the rights to turn Where's Waldo? into a live-action film, was to be produced by Chris Meledandri with Classic Media's (then DreamWorks Classics, now part of Universal) executive producer Eric Ellenbogen, but the project was then scrapped. |
| Feature film | Cryptozoology movie | In December 2009, Illumination Entertainment was producing an animated film based on a pitch by actor-comedian Jack Black and Jason Micallef on cryptozoology, which is the study of legendary creatures whose existence has never been confirmed (i.e. the Loch Ness Monster or Bigfoot). Jack Black had intended to produce the film alongside Ben Cooley and Chris Meledandri through his production company Electric Dynamite. Additionally, he had no intention to voice any character as he did with DreamWorks Animation's Kung Fu Panda franchise. |

== 2010s ==
=== 2010 ===
| Series | Title | Description |
|---|---|---|
| Curious George | Curious George | By July 2010, Illumination was developing a live-action animated film based on Curious George, with Larry Stuckey writing the script, but in November 2015 the film project was cancelled. |
| Feature film | Pluto | In October 2010, Illumination Entertainment and Tezuka Productions jointly announced to develop a live-action/animated film of the Japanese manga series Pluto. |
| The Addams Family | The Addams Family | In 2010, Universal and Illumination acquired the underlying rights to the Addams Family drawings. The film was planned to be a stop-motion animated film based on Charles Addams's original drawings. Tim Burton was set to co-write and co-produce the film, with a possibility to direct. By July 2013, the film was cancelled; had been made, this would have been Illumination's first stop-motion animated film. Eventually, Metro-Goldwyn-Mayer picked up rights to the film and an animated film was released in 2019, with Sausage Party directors Greg Tiernan and former DreamWorks Animation staff member Conrad Vernon to direct. Universal handled the international distribution rights for the film, as well as physical home media worldwide distribution rights. |

=== 2011 ===
| Series | Title | Description |
|---|---|---|
| Feature film | Uglydolls | In May 2011, Illumination acquired the rights to Uglydolls to make an animated feature film, but the project never came into fruition. An animated film based on Uglydolls became the first family and animation project produced by STXfilms and was released in May 2019. |
| Woody Woodpecker | Woody Woodpecker | By November 2011, Universal and Illumination planned a Woody Woodpecker feature film. Writing duo John Altschuler and Dave Krinsky (Blades of Glory and King of the Hill) were in talks to develop a story, but in July 2013, Illumination canceled the project. The film was eventually released as a live-action/CGI hybrid film in 2017. |

=== 2012 ===
| Series | Title | Description |
|---|---|---|
| Feature film | The Cat in the Hat | In March 2012, following the financial success of The Lorax, the animated film adaptation of the Dr. Seuss book of the same name, Universal and Illumination announced plans to produce an animated adaptation of the book The Cat in the Hat. Rob Lieber was set to write the script, with Chris Meledandri as producer, and Audrey Geisel as the executive producer, but the project never came into fruition. By January 2018, Warner Animation Group was in development of an animated Cat in the Hat film as part of a creative partnership with Seuss Enterprises which is set to be released in 2026. |
| Feature film | Clifford the Big Red Dog | In May 2012, Universal and Illumination began to develop a live-action/animated feature film based on the Clifford the Big Red Dog book series. Matt Lopez was hired to write the script, while Chris Meledandri and Deborah Forte were attached to produce the film. In July 2013, Illumination dropped the project. Paramount Pictures later acquired the rights to develop the film, which was eventually released on November 10, 2021, following a number of delays due to the ongoing COVID-19 pandemic. |
| Feature film | Goblins | Laika Entertainment was interested to adapt the Philip Reeve's book named Goblins into an animated feature, but nothing came up of the project since the initial announcement. |

=== 2015 ===
| Series | Title | Description |
|---|---|---|
| Feature film | Johnny Express | In 2015, Universal and Illumination planned to adapt the South Korean CGI animated short Johnny Express into a feature-length animated film. |

=== 2017 ===
| Type | Title | Description |
|---|---|---|
| Feature film | Spooky Jack | In 2017, DreamWorks announced an original feature called Spooky Jack, with a planned release date of September 17, 2021. Jason Blum was to serve as executive producer, and would have been a co-production with Blumhouse Productions. The premise would have been about three siblings who moved into an eerie new home and discover that all the creatures that have been told do not exist. By October 2019, Spooky Jack was removed from the schedule, with its original release date replaced by The Bad Guys, based on the Scholastic book series by Aaron Blabey. Concept art for the film have been released. |
| Feature film | The Wizards of Once | In March 2017, DreamWorks purchased film rights to the book from How to Train Your Dragon author Cressida Cowell to make it into another animated fantasy film series. |

=== 2018 ===
| Type | Title | Description |
|---|---|---|
| Feature film | Mice and Mystics | In October 2018, DreamWorks Animation acquired the rights to the role-playing game for a potential animated film adaptation of the board game of the same name. Alexandre Aja, long-time horror film director, was set to direct and write the film's script along with David Leslie Johnson-McGoldrick. Vertigo Entertainment's Roy Lee and Jon Berg were also set to serve as producers. But as of 2025, nothing came of it. |
| Feature film | Sputnik | In April 2018, Leo Matsuda sold a project to DreamWorks on his film idea based on the children's book Spudnik's Guide to Earth by Frank Cottrell-Boyce, who was also attached to co-write the screenplay. Matsuda was also attached to direct the film. There have been no further reports on the status of the project. |
| Feature film | Yokai Samba | In April 2018, Leo Matsuda was hired to write and direct Yokai Samba. The film's script was inspired by a folk story Matsuda heard in his youth about growing up and has both Brazilian and Japanese folklore influences. By March 2021, Paramount Animation and Nickelodeon began to develop the film. The work was confirmed to still be in progress in June 2024. |
| Feature film | Untitled Pharrell Williams project | In 2018, it was reported that an original project with Pharrell Williams was being worked on at Illumination, being "made from scratch". Nothing materialized, and six years later, an unrelated animated project starring Williams, Piece by Piece was released by Universal, though LEGO versions of Kevin, Stuart, and Bob from the Despeciable Me franchise make cameo appearances in the film. |

=== 2019 ===
| Series | Title | Description |
|---|---|---|
| VeggieTales | Untitled VeggieTales film | In March 2019, just around the same time as the announcement of The VeggieTales Show, series creator Phil Vischer revealed that a new film based on VeggieTales is in development, later said to be centered around a Bible story similar to Jonah: A VeggieTales Movie. In 2020, Phil completed and turned in the screenplay's first draft. He was given notes and the go-ahead to revise and write a second draft before the official pitch to studio executives. Phil completed the final draft of the screenplay and Universal was in talks with a co-production partner for the film. Eventually, Phil, alongside Mike Nawrocki, Lisa Vischer, and Kurt Heinecke, departed from Big Idea Entertainment, thus putting the company in limbo. |

== 2020s ==
=== 2020 ===
| Series / type | Title | Description |
|---|---|---|
| Feature film | Ronan Boyle and the Bridge of Riddles | In September 2020, DreamWorks began development on a film adaptation of Tom Lennon's book of the same name with The Angry Birds Movie director Fergal Reilly directing. However, nothing came of it since. |

=== 2021 ===
| Series / type | Title | Description |
|---|---|---|
| Feature film | Untitled Stephen Curry project | In September 2021, National Basketball Association (NBA) player for Golden State Warriors Stephen Curry announced a film project for DreamWorks Animation under his Unanimous Media banner, but his project would eventually make its turnaround to Sony Pictures Animation in May 2024 under his 2026 film Goat. |

=== 2022 ===
| Series | Title | Description |
|---|---|---|
| Feature film | Big Tree | In June 2022, Universal and Illumination planned to develop a movie in co-production with Amblin Entertainment an animated feature based on Brian Selznick's novel of the same name, which was inspired by an idea from both Steven Spielberg and Meledandri. Nothing was materialized as of 2026. |

=== 2023 ===
| Series | Title | Description |
|---|---|---|
| Feature film | Another Me | In 2023, the website Cartoon Brew reported that a Bollywood-themed film project titled Another Me had been shelved due in part to "significant reductions in staffing". |

=== 2024 ===
| Series / type | Title | Description |
|---|---|---|
| VeggieTales | LarryBoy | In January 2024, it was announced that Big Idea and Kingstone Studios were developing a LarryBoy film with a projected 2026 theatrical release. DreamWorks Animation story artist, Claire Morrissey, was hired to direct. In a reply on X, Phil Vischer revealed that the project was no longer in development. |

=== 2025 ===
| Series / type | Title | Description |
|---|---|---|
| Shrek | Untitled Lord Farquaad film | KPop Demon Hunters writers Danya Jimenze and Hanna McMechan at some point developed a film centered around the Shrek antagonist Lord Farquaad. |

== See also ==
- List of unproduced DreamWorks Animation projects
