= List of animated series based on video games =

This is a list of animated series based on video games. It does not include Japanese anime series, which are listed separately on the List of anime based on video games, but everything could be listed on the List of television series based on video games.

== Animated series ==
Title	Video game of origin	Year	Production companies	Network
Pac-Man	Pac-Man by Namco and Midway Mfg.	1982–1983	Hanna-Barbera Productions	ABC
Saturday Supercade	Various (Note: Donkey Kong and Donkey Kong Jr. by Nintendo Pitfall! by Activision Frogger by Konami and Sega Q*bert by Mylstar Space Ace by Don Bluth Kangaroo by Sun Electronics and Atari, Inc.)	1983–1984	Ruby-Spears Productions	CBS
Dragon's Lair	Dragon's Lair by Rick Dyer and Don Bluth	1984	Ruby-Spears Productions	ABC
Pole Position	Pole Position by Namco	1984	DIC Enterprises	CBS
The Super Mario Bros. Super Show!	Super Mario Bros. and Super Mario Bros. 2 by Nintendo	1989	DIC Enterprises, Nintendo of America, Saban Entertainment	Syndication
The Legend of Zelda	The Legend of Zelda by Nintendo	1989	DIC Enterprises, Nintendo of America	Syndication
Captain N: The Game Master	Kid Icarus by Nintendo, Mega Man by Capcom, Castlevania by Konami	1989–1991	DIC Animation City, Nintendo of America	NBC
The Adventures of Super Mario Bros. 3	Super Mario Bros. 3 by Nintendo	1990	DIC Animation City, Retitalia S.P.A., Nintendo of America	NBC
The Power Team	Various (Note: Narc Wizards & Warriors Kwirk Arch Rivals Bigfoot)	1990–1991		Syndication
Super Mario World	Super Mario World by Nintendo	1991	DIC Animation City, Retitalia S.P.A., Telecinco, Nintendo of America and CCTV	NBC
Battletoads (pilot)	Battletoads by Rare	1992	DIC Animation City and Bohbot Entertainment	Syndication
Adventures of Sonic the Hedgehog	Sonic the Hedgehog by Sega	1993–1996	DIC Animation City, Retitalia S.P.A., Telecinco, Sega of America and Bohbot Entertainment	Syndication
Double Dragon	Double Dragon by Technōs Japan and Tradewest	1993–1994	DIC Animation City, Retitalia S.P.A., Telecinco and Bohbot Entertainment	Syndication
Sonic the Hedgehog	Sonic the Hedgehog by Sega	1993–1994	DIC Productions, L.P., Retitalia S.P.A. and Telecinco	ABC
Bubsy (pilot)	Bubsy by Accolade	1993	Calico Entertainment, Imagination Factory and Bohbot Entertainment	Syndication
Where on Earth Is Carmen Sandiego?	Carmen Sandiego by Broderbund	1994–1999	DIC Productions, L.P.	FOX
Mutant League	Mutant League Football and Mutant League Hockey	1994–1996		
Mega Man	Mega Man by Capcom	1994–1996	Ruby-Spears Productions and Ashi Productions	Syndication
Earthworm Jim	Earthworm Jim by Shiny Entertainment	1995–1996	AKOM, Flextech, Shiny Entertainment and Universal Cartoon Studios	Kids' WB
Darkstalkers: The Animated Series	Darkstalkers by Capcom	1995	Graz Entertainment	Syndication
The Adventures of Hyperman	The Adventures of Hyperman	1995–1996		CBS
Street Fighter: The Animated Series	Street Fighter by Capcom	1995–1997	Graz Entertainment (Season 1), InVision Entertainment (Season 2) and USA Studios	USA Network
Mortal Kombat: Defenders of the Realm	Mortal Kombat by Midway Games	1996	Film Roman, Threshold Entertainment and New Line Television	USA Network
Wing Commander Academy	Wing Commander by Origin Systems	1996	Universal Cartoon Studios	USA Network
Nightmare Ned	Nightmare Ned	1997		ABC
Donkey Kong Country	Donkey Kong Country by Nintendo and Rare	1997–2000	Nelvana, Medialab Technology (season 1), Hong Guang Animation (season 2), Western International Communications, Ellipsanime, Medianet (season 2)	Teletoon (Canada), France 2 and Canal + (France)
Sonic Underground	Sonic the Hedgehog by Sega	1999	DIC Productions, L.P. and Les Studios Tex S.A.R.L.	TF1 (France); Syndication (United States)
Blaster's Universe	Blaster Learning System	1999–2000		CBS (US); Teletoon (Canada)
Rayman: The Animated Series	Rayman by Ubi Soft	1999–2000	Ubi Soft	Direct-to-Video
Skipper & Skeeto	Skipper & Skeeto	2001		Super RTL (Germany); DR1 (Denmark)
Moorhuhn	Crazy Chicken	2001		Super RTL
Jurassic War	Jurassic War 2	2002		MBC
Video Mods	Various	2004–2005		MTV2
Gift	Gift	2005		France 2
Mix Master: King of Cards	Mix Master Online	2005–2006		KBS2
Viva Piñata	Viva Piñata by Xbox Game Studios and Rare	2006–2009	Bardel Entertainment, 4Kids Entertainment and Microsoft	4Kids TV
Koongya Koongya	Catch Mind / Green Village	2006–2007		KBS2
Adiboo Adventure	Adibou	2007–2009		France 5
Revisioned: Tomb Raider	Tomb Raider	2007		GameTap
Tak and the Power of Juju	Tak and the Power of Juju by Avalanche Software	2007–2009	THQ and Nickelodeon Animation Studio	Nickelodeon
Magi-Nation	Magi Nation by Interactive Imagination Corp	2007–2010	Daewon Media, Cookie Jar Entertainment	CBC Television
Dao & Bazzi Boomhill Adventure	Crazy Arcade and Crazyracing Kartrider by Nexon	2007–2008		KBS2
Wakfu	Wakfu by Ankama	2008–present	Ankama Animations and France Télévisions	France 3, France 4 and Netflix
Ape Escape	Ape Escape by Sony Interactive Entertainment	2009	Frederator Studios, Hawaii Film Partners, Project 51 Productions and Showcase Entertainment	Nicktoons Network
Mix Master: Final Force	Mix Master Online	2010–2011		KBS2
Mole's World	Mole Manor	2011–2013		
Seer	Seer	2012–2023		
Talking Friends	Talking Tom & Friends by Outfit7 Entertainment	2012	Karactaz Animation, Disney Interactive Media Group and Outfit7 Entertainment	Disney.com and YouTube
Where's My Water?: Swampy's Underground Adventures	Where's My Water?	2012–2013		Disney.com and YouTube
Om Nom Stories	Cut the Rope	2012–present		YouTube
Dofus: The Treasures of Kerubim	Dofus by Ankama	2013–2014		France 3
Angry Birds Toons	Angry Birds by Rovio Entertainment	2013–2016	Rovio Entertainment	Toons.TV
Bravoman	Bravoman by Namco	2013–2014		YouTube
Pac-Man and the Ghostly Adventures	Pac-Man by Bandai Namco Entertainment	2013–2015	41 Entertainment, Arad Animation Inc., Bandai Namco Games, OLM, Inc. and Sprite Animation Studios	Disney XD
Mappy	Mappy by Namco	2013–2014		YouTube
Rabbids Invasion	Rabbids by Ubisoft	2013–2022	Ubisoft Motion Pictures and TeamTO	France 3
Invizimals	Invizimals	2013–2015		Super3 and Clan
Flower Angel	Flower Angel	2014–2023		
Talking Tom Shorts	Talking Tom & Friends by Outfit7	2014–present		YouTube
Piggy Tales	Bad Piggies by Rovio Entertainment	2014–2019	Rovio Entertainment	Toons.TV and YouTube
Astar-eul Hyanghae Chaguchagu	Chagu Chagu	2014–2015		KBS1
Angry Birds Stella	Angry Birds Stella by Rovio Entertainment	2014–2016	Rovio Entertainment	Toons.TV
Sonic Boom	Sonic the Hedgehog by Sega	2014–2017	Sega of America, Inc., OuiDo! Productions (Season 1), Technicolor Animation Productions (Season 2) and Lagardère Group	Cartoon Network and Boomerang (US); Gulli and Canal J (France)
Talking Tom and Friends	Talking Tom & Friends by Outfit7	2014–2021	Outfit7, ARX Anima (seasons 1–3), People Moving Pixels (seasons 4–5)	YouTube
Fantasy Westward Journey	Fantasy Westward Journey by NetEase	2014–2016		iQIYI, Mango TV, Tencent Video and Youku
Mini Ninjas	Mini Ninjas	2015–2019		TF1
Wooparoo Adventure	Wooparoo Mountain and Wooparoo Saga	2015		Anione
Transformice: The Cartoon Series	Transformice by Atelier 801	2015–2016	Atelier 801, Cross River Productions and Believe Digital	YouTube
Talking Tom and Friends Minis	Talking Tom & Friends by Outfit7	2016–2018		YouTube
Skylanders Academy	Skylanders and Spyro by Activision	2016–2018	TeamTO and Activision Blizzard Studios	Netflix
Clash-A-Rama! The Series	Clash of Clans by Supercell	2016–2019		YouTube
Elsword: El Lady	Elsword	2016–2017		YouTube
Closers: Side Blacklambs	Closers	2016–2019		YouTube
Angry Birds Blues	Angry Birds by Rovio Entertainment	2017	Rovio Entertainment	Toons.TV and YouTube
Pat the Dog	Space Dog	2017–2021		La Trois
Revelation	Revelation Online by NetEase	2017–2018		Bilibili, iQIYI, Mango TV, Sohu Video, Tencent Video and Youku
Fruit Ninja: Frenzy Force	Fruit Ninja by Halfbrick Studios	2017	Halfbrick Studios, Kickstart Entertainment and Toonz Entertainment	YouTube Red
Smighties	Mighty Smighties	2017		YouTube
Castlevania	Castlevania by Konami	2017–2021	Powerhouse Animation Studios, Project 51 Productions and Frederator Studios	Netflix
Stone Age: The Legendary Pet	Stone Age	2017–2018		KBS2
Taichi Panda	Taichi Panda	2017		Bilibili
The Running Heroes	Parkour Everyday	2017–2018		Tencent Video
Minecraft Mini Series	Minecraft by Mojang Studios	2017–2018	Mojang Studios, Xbox Game Studios, Atomic Cartoons and Mattel Creations	YouTube
Age of Gunslingers	Age of Gunslingers Online	2017–2020		Tencent Video
Sonic Mania Adventures	Sonic the Hedgehog by Sega	2018		YouTube
Subway Surfers: The Animated Series	Subway Surfers by SYBO and Kiloo	2018–2019	SYBO	YouTube
Mega Man: Fully Charged	Mega Man by Capcom	2018–2019	DHX Media, DHX Studios Vancouver, Dentsu Entertainment USA and Capcom	Cartoon Network
Carmen Sandiego	Carmen Sandiego by Broderbund	2019–2021	WildBrain Studios, Houghton Mifflin Harcourt and I Can and I Will Productions	Netflix
Alien: Isolation – The Digital Series	Alien: Isolation by Creative Assembly	2019		IGN
Costume Quest	Costume Quest by Double Fine	2019	Frederator Studios, Wellsville Productions, Double Fine and Amazon Studios	Amazon Prime Video
Talking Tom Heroes	Talking Tom & Friends by Outfit7	2019–2021		YouTube
Angry Birds MakerSpace	Angry Birds by Rovio Entertainment	2019–present	Rovio Entertainment	YouTube
Ninjin	Ninjin: Clash of Carrots	2019–2021		Cartoon Network
Triviatopia	Trivia Crack	2019		YouTube
Angry Birds Slingshot Stories	Angry Birds by Rovio Entertainment	2020–present	Rovio Entertainment	YouTube
Angry Birds Bubble Trouble	Angry Birds by Rovio Entertainment	2020–2023	Rovio Entertainment	Amazon FreeTime Unlimited and YouTube
Dota: Dragon's Blood	Dota 2 by Valve	2021–2022	Studio Mir and Kaiju Boulevard	Netflix
Freddy & Friends: On Tour!	Five Nights at Freddy's by Scott Cawthon	2021	Steel Wool Studios	YouTube
Legends of Dawn: The Sacred Stone	Mobile Legends: Bang Bang by Moonton	2021	Moonton	WeTV and Iflix (International); TV9 (Malaysia); NET (Indonesia); Kapamilya Channel and A2Z (Philippines)
Arcane	League of Legends by Riot Games	2021–2024	Riot Games and Fortiche Production	Netflix
Angry Birds: Summer Madness	Angry Birds by Rovio Entertainment	2022	Rovio Animation, Cake Entertainment, Yowza! Animation and Kickstart Entertainment	Netflix
The Cuphead Show!	Cuphead by Studio MDHR	2022	Studio MDHR, King Features Syndicate and Netflix Animation	Netflix
Trivia Quest	Trivia Crack	2022		Netflix
AFK Arena: Just Esperia Things	AFK Arena	2022		Bilibili and YouTube
Soul Knight Strange Tales	Soul Knight	2022–2024		Bilibili and YouTube
Marvel's Midnight Suns Prequel Shorts	Marvel's Midnight Suns	2022	2K Games	YouTube
Dragon Age: Absolution	Dragon Age by BioWare	2022	BioWare and Red Dog Culture House	Netflix
Hello Neighbor: Welcome to Raven Brooks	Hello Neighbor by tinyBuild	2022–present	tinyBuild, Man of Action Entertainment, Creation Station and Animasia Studio	YouTube
Sonic Prime	Sonic the Hedgehog by Sega	2022–2024	Sega of America, Inc., WildBrain Studios and Man of Action Entertainment	Netflix
Genesis	Overwatch by Blizzard Entertainment	2023		YouTube
Castlevania: Nocturne	Castlevania by Konami	2023–2025	Powerhouse Animation Studios and Project 51 Productions	Netflix
Captain Laserhawk: A Blood Dragon Remix	Far Cry 3: Blood Dragon by Ubisoft	2023	Ubisoft Film & Television, Bobbypills, and Bootleg Universe	Netflix
Ark: The Animated Series	Ark: Survival Evolved by Studio Wildcard	2024–present	Lex + Otis and Studio Wildcard	Paramount+
Angry Birds Mystery Island	Angry Birds by Rovio Entertainment	2024	Rovio Entertainment, Titmouse, Inc. and Amazon MGM Studios	Amazon Prime Video
Dead Cells: Immortalis	Dead Cells by Motion Twin	2024	Bobbypills	Animation Digital Network
Tomb Raider: The Legend of Lara Croft	Tomb Raider by Crystal Dynamics	2024–2025	Powerhouse Animation Studios, Crystal Dynamics, DJ2 Entertainment, Panda Burrow, and Legendary Television	Netflix
Secret Level	Various (Note: Armored Core by FromSoftware Concord by Sony Interactive Entertainment Crossfire by Smilegate Exodus by Archetype Entertainment Honor of Kings by TiMi Studio Group Mega Man by Capcom New World: Aeternum by Amazon Games The Outer Worlds 2 by Obsidian Entertainment Pac-Man (Shadow Labyrinth) by Bandai Namco Entertainment Sifu by Sloclap Spelunky by Mossmouth, LLC Unreal Tournament by Epic Games Warhammer 40,000: Space Marine 2 by Games Workshop)	2024–present	Blur Studio and Amazon MGM Studios	Amazon Prime Video
Talking Tom Heroes: Suddenly Super	Talking Tom and Friends by Outfit7	2025–present	Outfit7 and Epic Story Media	YouTube
Devil May Cry	Devil May Cry by Capcom	2025–present	Studio Mir and Bootleg Universe	Netflix
Splinter Cell: Deathwatch	Tom Clancy's Splinter Cell by Ubisoft	2025–present	Ubisoft Film & Television, Tradecraft, Sun Creature Studio, and FOST Studio	Netflix
Sword and Fairy 3	Chinese Paladin 3	2025–present		Tencent Video
Among Us	Among Us	2026	CBS Eye Animation Productions, Titmouse, Inc., Keybot, Innersloth	Paramount+
Golden Axe	Golden Axe by Sega	2026	CBS Studios and Sony Pictures Television	Paramount+

=== In development ===
Title	Video game of origin	Year	Production companies	Network
Final Fantasy IX: The Black Mages' Legacy	Final Fantasy IX by Square Enix	2028	Square Enix and EuroVisual Studios	TBA
Clash of Clans	Clash of Clans by Supercell	TBA	Netflix Animation	Netflix
Crash Bandicoot	Crash Bandicoot by Activision	TBA	Activision, WildBrain Studios, and Netflix Animation	Netflix
Diablo	Diablo by Blizzard Entertainment	TBA	Blizzard Entertainment	Netflix
Earthworm Jim: Beyond the Groovy	Earthworm Jim by Interplay Entertainment	TBA	Interplay Entertainment and Sega of America	TBA
Gears of War	Gears of War by Xbox Game Studios	TBA	Netflix Animation Studios and The Coalition	Netflix
Grounded	Grounded by Xbox Game Studios and Obsidian Entertainment	TBA	Waterproof Studios/SC Productions, Kinetic Media and Bardel Entertainment	TBA
Hungry Shark Squad	Hungry Shark by Ubisoft	TBA	Ubisoft Film & Television	TBA
Hyper Light Drifter	Hyper Light Drifter by Heart Machine	TBA	Heart Machine	TBA
Minecraft	Minecraft by Mojang Studios	TBA	WildBrain Studios	Netflix
Mobile Legends: Bang Bang	Mobile Legends: Bang Bang by Moonton	TBA	Base FX, The Little Black Book Studios	TBA
RuneScape	RuneScape by Jagex	TBA	Jagex, Meatier Productions and Lyrical Animation	TBA
Sonic	Sonic the Hedgehog by Sega	TBA	Sega of America, Inc.	Netflix
Watch Dogs	Watch Dogs by Ubisoft	TBA	Ubisoft Film & Television	TBA
Wuthering Waves: Elysium	Wuthering Waves by Kuro Games	TBA	Kuro Games and Kuro Onroad	TBA

== See also ==
- List of television series based on video games
- List of anime based on video games
- List of films based on video games
