= List of Angry Birds Toons episodes =

This is a list of all 104 episodes for Rovio Entertainment's animated series Angry Birds Toons. A total of 52 three-minute episodes were released in the first season, with Rovio releasing one episode per week between 17 March 2013 and 8 March 2014.

Each episode premiered on Comcast's on-demand services, Roku's set-top boxes, and Samsung's smart TVs, and was broadcast on television in twelve countries one day before its release through all Angry Birds applications for smartphones and tablets on Toons.TV.

A second season of the series, consisting of 26 episodes, ran between 14 October 2014 and 12 April 2015. The third season of the series (in which the 100th overall episode aired on 15 April 2016), also consisting of 26 episodes, started on 1 October 2015 and ended on 13 May 2016, the latter being the same day The Angry Birds Movie theatrically released in Finland and the United Kingdom.

== Series overview ==
| Series | Episodes | Originally released | |
| Series | Episodes | First released | Last released |
|---|---|---|---|
| 1 | 52 | 17 March 2013 | 8 March 2014 |
| 2 | 26 | 19 October 2014 | 12 April 2015 |
| 3 | 26 | 1 October 2015 | 13 May 2016 |

== Episodes ==
=== Season 1 (2013–14) ===
| No. overall | No. in series | Title | Directed by | Written by | Original release date |
|---|---|---|---|---|---|
| 1 | 1 | "Chuck Time" | Kim Helminen | Niklas Lindgren and Ian Carney | 17 March 2013 |
When Chuck tries to set up a slingshot, he accidentally pushes Red off a cliff. To save him, Chuck actives his supersonic speed, making everything else appear in slow motion.
| 2 | 2 | "Where's My Crown?" | Kim Helminen | Niklas Lindgren and Ian Carney | 24 March 2013 |
A hungry King Pig unknowingly loses his crown when he goes to get some candy apples while the crown is inadvertently thrown into the trash. The other pigs don't recognize the King without his crown and shun him.
| 3 | 3 | "Full Metal Chuck" | Kim Helminen | Ian Carney | 31 March 2013 |
Chuck forces the Blues (Jay, Jake, and Jim) to take part in a challenging obstacle course, despite the fact that they would rather sleep. Chuck gives a demonstration of each section, but the Blues wind up doing all the tricks better than him.
| 4 | 4 | "Another Birthday" | Kim Helminen | Samuli Valkama and Ian Carney | 7 April 2013 |
One of the Minion Pigs has a birthday, but none of the other pigs want to celebrate with him as they partake in their daily working routine.
| 5 | 5 | "Egg Sounds" | Kim Helminen | Samuli Valkama and Ian Carney | 14 April 2013 |
The Blues trick Red, Matilda, and Chuck into thinking that the eggs are saying their first chirps by playing a saxophone. An argument then begins over who would be a good influence.
| 6 | 6 | "Pig Talent" | Kim Helminen | Niklas Lindgren and Ian Carney | 20 April 2013 |
The pigs have a semi-course talent show featuring King Pig as a special guest and judge. However, the punishment for failing to impress the king, is getting flushed down a trap door, which worries the contestants.
| 7 | 7 | "Cordon Bleugh!" | Chris Sadler and Kim Helminen | Niklas Lindgren and Ian Carney | 27 April 2013 |
Matilda cooks a stew that Red, the Blues, nor Chuck want to eat. While they try to find ways to avoid eating it behind Matilda's back, Corporal Pig and two minions try to steal the eggs, but the flock unknowingly foils their attempts whilst trying to get rid of the stew.
| 8 | 8 | "True Blue?" | Kim Helminen | Niklas Lindgren and Ian Carney | 4 May 2013 |
Chef Pig sends a Minion Pig disguised as one of the Blues to blend in with them and steal the eggs. The Blues pretend to be fooled and subject the disguised pig to a series of dangerous stunts.
| 9 | 9 | "Do as I Say!" | Eric Guaglione | Ian Carney and Eric Guaglione | 11 May 2013 |
The Blues pull dangerous stunts that put the eggs in danger, irritating Matilda. As she scolds them for their idea of fun, Matilda ends up going against her own morals when a pig tries to steal the eggs.
| 10 | 10 | "Off Duty" | Eric Guaglione | Samuli Valkama, Ian Carney and Eric Guaglione | 18 May 2013 |
Red grows stressed from guarding the eggs alone, so Matilda allows Red to go on vacation and puts Chuck, Bomb and the Blues in charge of guarding. However, due to being more interested in relaxing than guarding, they are defenceless against an attack by the pigs. Meanwhile, on his vacation, Red begins having hallucinations of eggs everywhere he looks.
| 11 | 11 | "Slingshot 101" | Chris Sadler and Kari Juusonen | Niklas Lindgren, Ian Carney and Eric Guaglione | 25 May 2013 |
After seeing the Blues performing dangerous stunts with the slingshot, Red tries to teach them the right way to use it, but gets flung far away right when the pigs are trying to steal the eggs. Note: This is the first episode to feature the show's updated intro theme.
| 12 | 12 | "Thunder Chuck" | Kim Helminen | Ian Carney | 1 June 2013 |
While trying to guard the eggs at night, Chuck becomes astrapophobic during a thunderstorm. Corporal Pig takes advantage of this by making his minions fake the sound of thunder to steal the eggs.
| 13 | 13 | "Gardening with Terence" | Eric Guaglione | Ian Carney, Stuart Kenworthy and Smauli Valkama | 8 June 2013 |
Terence intrudes on Matilda's garden, blocking out the sunlight and causing the latter's plants to begin to wilt. Matilda tries several methods of moving Terence, to no success. Note: This is the first episode to be animated by Toon City, which made a drastic change to the animation style starting with this episode.
| 14 | 14 | "Dopeys on a Rope" | Chris Sadler | Stuart Kenworthy | 15 June 2013 |
Corporal Pig and his minions try to steal the eggs by bungee jumping from a cliff above. Note: This is the first episode to feature Corporal Pig's heavily updated design.
| 15 | 15 | "Trojan Egg" | Eric Guaglione | Ian Carney, JP Saari and Eric Guaglione | 22 June 2013 |
At night, Chef Pig hides King Pig in a large trojan egg intended as a way to fool the birds and get the eggs. However, the birds quickly see through the poor disguise and return the egg to the pigs, who think it is a gift and prepare to cook. When Chef Pig finds out, he tries to take advantage of the King's apparent demise by appointing himself as the new king.
| 16 | 16 | "Double Take" | Christopher Sadler and Kari Juusonen | Christopher Sadler and JP Saari | 29 June 2013 |
Matilda tasks the Blues with guarding the eggs while she is gone, but the brothers decide to play in the mud instead, ultimately ending up accidentally knocking the eggs into a bush. With the eggs missing, the Blues pretend to be eggs so that Matilda does not become suspicious. Corporal Pig soon arrives and kidnaps the trio, also thinking that they are the real eggs, and replaces them with pigs whom are also pretending to be eggs.
| 17 | 17 | "Crash Test Piggies" | Kim Helminen | Stuart Kenworthy | 6 July 2013 |
Corporal Pig's minions line up to pilot test several prototype rockets built to assist in stealing the eggs, which are all failures much to the Corporal's chagrin and the final Minion Pig's fright.
| 18 | 18 | "Slappy-Go-Lucky" | Chris Sadler | Ian Carney | 13 July 2013 |
Foreman Pig steals Professor Pig's blueprints for a robot and makes a large-scale replica to impress the king. Note: For unknown reasons, this episode makes use of the previous intro theme.
| 19 | 19 | "Sneezy Does It" | Kari Juusonen | Stuart Kenworthy | 20 July 2013 |
During a celebration, one of the pigs in the audience causes the King's chariot to fall and is forced to carry it to the castle.
| 20 | 20 | "Run Chuck Run" | Chris Sadler | Stuart Kenworthy | 27 July 2013 |
Red and Matilda host a cross-country race with Chuck, Bomb, the Blues and Terence as the contestants. Chuck, having an ego boost believing that no one else could possibly beat him, is surprised to find that the seemingly-static bird Terence is always ahead of him.
| 21 | 21 | "Hypno Pigs" | Kim Helminen | Ian Carney | 3 August 2013 |
The pigs anesthetize Red via hypnosis, but get distracted and use Red for activities rather than stealing the eggs.
| 22 | 22 | "Egg's Day Out" | Eric Guaglione | Ian Carney and Ashley Boddy | 10 August 2013 |
Red accidentally causes one of the three eggs to fall out of the nest and into the river. He chases the egg into Pig City and goes through a series of misadventures in an attempt to retrieve it.
| 23 | 23 | "Gate Crasher" | Kari Juusonen | Ian Carney | 17 August 2013 |
After the pigs have stolen the eggs again, a metallic gate blocks Chuck from progressing any further. He tries several methods of getting through, much to the pigs' entertainment and Red's disinterest.
| 24 | 24 | "Hog Roast" | Chris Sadler | Stuart Kenworthy | 24 August 2013 |
Pig City's fire department, led by Foreman Pig, are called to put out a small fire involving a grill, but their clumsy antics cause the fire to spread throughout the city.
| 25 | 25 | "The Bird That Cried Pig" | Kim Helminen | Stuart Kenworthy | 31 August 2013 |
Bomb takes all the credit from getting the eggs from the pigs, unknowingly causing Chuck to become jealous of Bomb's attention. That night, he hides the eggs and pretends they are missing so that he can pose as their rescuer and receive attention, only for the pigs to steal them.
| 26 | 26 | "Hamshank Redemption" | Kari Juusonen | Stuart Kenworthy | 7 September 2013 |
A prisoner pig attempts to break out of jail, but is caught with each attempt.
| 27 | 27 | "Green Pig Soup" | Kari Juusonen | Glenn Dakin | 14 September 2013 |
Corporal Pig sends three minions disguised as cabbages in order to sneak past Matilda's garden and grab the eggs. Matilda, however, is planning to cook a vegetable soup, which includes cabbages; the pigs unsuccessfully try to hide from Matilda, fearing being cooked.
| 28 | 28 | "Catch of the Day" | Chris Sadler | Les Spink and Chris Sadler | 21 September 2013 |
Corporal Pig uses a plunger cannon on a boat to remotely snatch the eggs. The Blues easily outsmart him by attaching several random everyday objects to each plunger.
| 29 | 29 | "Nighty Night Terence" | Eric Guaglione | Anastasia Heinzl | 28 September 2013 |
Corporal Pig and two Minion Pigs attempt to steal the eggs, which are sat on top of a sleeping Terence. They use plungers, shot from a crossbow, but have to do so without awaking Terence. Corporal sings a lullaby every time Terence does wake up to put him back to sleep.
| 30 | 30 | "Piggy Wig" | Kim Helminen and Thomas Lepeska | Glenn Dakin | 5 October 2013 |
On a stormy night, King Pig has trouble finding the perfect wig to wear for a party, where all the pigs attending must wear wigs. Meanwhile, the Blues are partaking in target practice with the slingshot when one of the brothers gets shot down by lightning, falls in the castle, and lands on the king's head. Thinking that the bird is an actual wig, King Pig decides that it will be perfect for the party. Regaining consciousness, the blue bird makes the guests laugh hysterically by making silly faces. The bird's brothers then come to take him home, but not before wrecking the party.
| 31 | 31 | "Pig Plot Potion" | Thomas Lepeska | Stuart Kenworthy | 12 October 2013 |
Chef Pig invents a potion that transforms any living creature into a pig, using the potion on Red. Now a pig, Red steals the eggs for Chef Pig and helps him prepare a meal for King Pig. During this, Red begins transforming back into a bird, much to Chef's panic.
| 32 | 32 | "Tooth Royal" | Kim Helminen | Ian Carney | 19 October 2013 |
When one of King Pig's teeth becomes rotted and aching, Foreman and the Minion Pigs test numerous methods of removing the tooth, which all result in everyone else's teeth getting knocked out instead.
| 33 | 33 | "Night of the Living Pork" | Kari Juusonen | Anastasia Heinzl | 26 October 2013 |
King Pig receives a visit from trick-or-treaters who turn out to be zombie pigs, all of whom want his candy. Bubbles the orange bird also visits King Pig's castle to receive candy, and helps fend off the zombie pigs.
| 34 | 34 | "King of the Castle" | Thomas Lepeska | Glenn Dorkin | 2 November 2013 |
King Pig becomes jealous of Chef Pig's sandcastles, which he believes are better than his, and commands his minions to build even better ones, with Chef continuously outdoing him every time.
| 35 | 35 | "Love is in the Air" | Chris Sadler | Ian Carney | 9 November 2013 |
While Corporal Pig is using cabbages to test trebuchets, a cabbage is misfired and crashes into King Pig's castle, hitting him on the head. This causes him to have a delusion where he mistakes the cabbage for a beautiful female pig, falling in love with it, much to the Corporal Pig's annoyance and the Minion Pigs' amusement. Note: The song "Dance of the Reed Flutes" by Pyotr Ilyich Tchaikovsky plays at the end of the episode.
| 36 | 36 | "Fired Up" | Lauri Konttori, Janne Roivainen and Kim Helminen | Mikko Polla, Lauri Konttori and Janne Roivainen | 16 November 2013 |
Chuck tries to warm up the eggs on a cold and windy day, but fails to do so, with Matilda succeeding. Jealous and frustrated, Chuck concentrates the heat of the sun using an oversized magnifying glass to try and warm the eggs up more than Matilda. This ends up creating a beam of fire that seems to gain consciousness. Note: The original intro theme and rigged animation style is used in this episode, indicating that this episode was produced along with the series' earliest episodes.
| 37 | 37 | "Clash of Corns" | Kari Juusonen | Stuart Kenworthy | 23 November 2013 |
Bomb wants to eat Matilda's single ear of corn, but Matilda refuses to let him have it. Bomb initiates a series of attempts to eat the corn, only for them all to be foiled by Matilda. Soon, Matilda goes so far as to openly attack Bomb during each attempt.
| 38 | 38 | "A Pig's Best Friend" | Avgousta Zourelidi | Richard Preddy | 30 November 2013 |
King Pig is given one of the Blues as a pet from two of his minions. Before the bird's brothers can rescue him, the bird instead chooses to play tricks on the king, who has to make it look like they are getting along whenever the Minion Pigs from before appear. When the blue bird abandons the king, the latter grows upset.
| 39 | 39 | "Slumber Mill" | Avgousta Zourelidi | Richard Preddy | 7 December 2013 |
A road is built on top of a lumberjack pig, preventing him from sleeping or doing his job.
| 40 | 40 | "Jingle Yells" | Eric Guaglione | Ian Carney | 14 December 2013 |
Corporal Pig dresses as Santa Claus in order to steal the eggs from the Blues, who are not fooled.
| 41 | 41 | "El Porkador!" | Thomas Lepeska and Carl Upsdell | Stuart Kenworthy | 21 December 2013 |
El Porkador, a big pig dressed in a luchador costume, is used in Corporal Pig's attempt to defeat the birds and take the eggs. The flock is no match for the new giant foe, until Terence, being just as big as El Porkador, intervenes.
| 42 | 42 | "Hiccups" | Eric Guaglione | Valerie Chappellet | 28 December 2013 |
The Blues get hiccups, which the flock finds adorable at first, but soon get tired of the noise and try to stop it.
| 43 | 43 | "The Butterfly Effect" | Thomas Lepeska and Carl Upsdell | Ian Carney | 4 January 2014 |
On a hot day, Matilda gets fanned by a passing butterfly to cool her down. Seeing this, Corporal Pig attempts to distract Matilda with a fake makeshift butterfly in order to get the eggs unnoticed.
| 44 | 44 | "Hambo" | Chris Sadler | David Vinicombe | 11 January 2014 |
Hard Pig, a tough and capable Minion Pig, is the sole graduate of his training camp and is thus tasked to retrieve the eggs.
| 45 | 45 | "Bird Flu" | Thomas Lepeska and Carl Upsdell | Glenn Dakin | 18 January 2014 |
The birds come down with avian influenza, which results in an ailing Red failing to stop the pigs when they attack the eggs. Matilda makes a medicine that cures the flock, allowing them to retrieve the eggs from the pigs, who have caught the virus as well. Note: This episode, as well as the next, is animated by Atomic Cartoons instead of Toon City.
| 46 | 46 | "Piggies From The Deep" | Thomas Lepeska and Carl Upsdell | Valerie Chappellet | 25 January 2014 |
Two minion pigs don shark costumes to scare other pigs relaxing in pools. Foreman Pig attempts to retaliate with a shark costume, but is targeted when an angry mob riots against him. Note: This episode, as well as the previous, was animated by Atomic Cartoons instead of Toon City. This episode also appeared on a TV set in the Angry Birds: Slingshot Stories episode "Popped".
| 47 | 47 | "Oh, Gnome!" | Kim Helminen | Glenn Dakin | 1 February 2014 |
Chuck gifts Matilda a creepy mechanical garden gnome statue, which Matilda dislikes due to its electronic noises annoying her. She tries to find a way to get rid of it without hurting Chuck's feelings whenever he appears.
| 48 | 48 | "Shrub It In" | Kari Juusonen and Meruan Salim | Anastasia Heinzl | 8 February 2014 |
When Bomb and the Blues unintentionally destroy Matilda's only rose bush, Bomb searches all over the island for a replacement bush while the Blues try to distract Matilda with some magic tricks. The new bush that Bomb finds, however, happens to belong to the pigs.
| 49 | 49 | "The Truce" | Chris Sadler | Marie Beardmore and Chris Sadler | 15 February 2014 |
Chef Pig pretends to make a truce with the birds by cooking them hearty meals laced with sleeping potion in order to distract them from guarding the eggs while two Minion Pigs clumsily attempt to steal the eggs.
| 50 | 50 | "Operation Opera" | Kim Helminen | Richard Preddy | 22 February 2014 |
Foreman Pig creates a mechanical opera-singing bird, with a singer pig providing its voice from inside, in order to woo Matilda away from the nest.
| 51 | 51 | "Chucked Out" | Chris Sadler and Avgousta Zourelidi | Anastasia Heinzl | 1 March 2014 |
When Chuck's karate-chopping shenanigans wreaks havoc among the flock, almost sending Red and the eggs off the edge of a cliff, he is exiled and forced to live a hobo life. When the pigs capture the flock and try to steal the eggs, however, Chuck is the only one able to stop them.
| 52 | 52 | "Bomb's Awake" | Avgousta Zourelidi | Stuart Kenworthy | 8 March 2014 |
At night, Bomb starts to sleepwalk, and explodes upon hitting anything in his way. The Blues find this amusing at first, but quickly become worried about the eggs when Bomb starts carrying them away. The triplets work to keep Bomb and the eggs out of harm's way.

=== Season 2 (2014–15) ===
| No. overall | No. in series | Title | Directed by | Written by | Original release date |
|---|---|---|---|---|---|
| 53 | 1 | "Treasure Hunt" | Jari Vaara | Valérie Chappellet | 19 October 2014 |
Hard Pig goes on mission to find buried treasure, following a treasure map where the X marks the spot.
| 54 | 2 | "Sweets of Doom" | Juanma Sanchez Cervantes | Anastasia Heinzl | 26 October 2014 |
Bubbles attends King Pig's Halloween amusement park at his castle to get candy and tries to get King Pig's, but the greedy king tries to prevent Bubbles from grabbing any. When one candy piece comes loose, they chase it down into a secret chamber in the castle's depths, containing endless tons of glowing-green candy. When King Pig eats it, he turns into a colossal Cthulhu-esque monster that destroys the castle. After Bubbles defeats him, the glowing candy is then spread across the castle remains and Pig City, where all the other pigs and Bubbles eat the candy and transforms into monsters, with the latter's transformation being hidden off-screen.
| 55 | 3 | "Party Ahoy" | Thomas Lepeska | Richard Preddy | 2 November 2014 |
When King Pig misses the boat to a private island party, he gets Foreman Pig to build him a boat to get there, with every attempt failing. King Pig resorts to swimming there in a lifebuoy, ending up on the wrong island right as a volcano on the correct island erupts.
| 56 | 4 | "Hide and Seek" | Thomas Lepeska | Glenn Dakin | 9 November 2014 |
Chuck continuously wins against the Blues in a game of hide-and-seek, so when it is his turn to hide, he finds the perfect place inside a tree trunk. However, he gets stuck and almost drowns when a storm arises. As the trunk is lit on fire, Chuck is shot high up into the air. When he crashes back down, the Blues think he hid on the moon and declare him a champion.
| 57 | 5 | "Sink or Swim" | Jose Guzman and Juanma Sanchez Cervantes | Stuart Kenworthy | 16 November 2014 |
The whole flock plays in the sea by the beach, all except for Red; he cannot swim. He later tries to teach himself how to swim with different water gear, but fails each time and is mocked by the fish down in the water. But when the pigs steal the eggs, Red swims out and rescues them. As Red celebrates he sinks once again, coming across a party being held by the fish.
| 58 | 6 | "Super Bomb!" | Juanma Sanchez Cervantes | Stuart Kenworthy | 23 November 2014 |
Bomb is inspired by a superhero comic book to dress up as one with a red blanket for a cape. While he performs some heroic deeds for the birds, he struggles to stop the pigs from stealing the eggs. Note: Archival footage of this episode appears on a TV set in the Angry Birds: Slingshot Stories episode "Popped".
| 59 | 7 | "Just So" | Juanma Sanchez Cervantes | Richard Preddy | 30 November 2014 |
Red wants a perfect environment for the eggs to incubate. He begins to notice things that bother him to the point that he feels the need to get rid of them. The pigs try to steal the eggs during these moments, with Red inadvertently making things harder for the pigs.
| 60 | 8 | "The Miracle of Life" | Jari Vaara | Agnès Slimovici | 7 December 2014 |
Foreman Pig and the Minion Pigs kidnap Red and Chuck, trap them in a cage, and force them to mate with a cabbage, believing that they can fertilise the cabbage and turn it into an egg. With Red confused and Chuck embarrassed, they trick the pigs using a fake prop egg and escape.
| 61 | 9 | "Cave Pig" | Thomas Lepeska | Glenn Dakin | 14 December 2014 |
Corporal Pig and some Minion Pigs find a frozen cavepig while ice fishing, and bring it into the palace. When the cavepig's ice block melts in the middle of the night, he looks for food in Chef Pig's kitchen while competing with King Pig for cupcakes, with Chef aiding King.
| 62 | 10 | "Joy to the Pigs" | Kim Helminen | Anastasia Heinzl | 21 December 2014 |
Terence, dressed up as Santa, visits the pigs to give them presents. King Pig does not get one until he learns to treat others kindly.
| 63 | 11 | "Dogzilla" | Thomas Lepeska | Stuart Kenworthy | 28 December 2014 |
A salvaged robot dog toy's movements makes everyone in Pig City scared, believing it is a monster. Corporal Pig brings King Pig into a bomb shelter and launches a missile at the dog toy.
| 64 | 12 | "Boulder Bro" | Juanma Sanchez Cervantes | Richard Preddy | 4 January 2015 |
Chuck creates a pretend friend with a stone rock, who shows a smile when Chuck does his karate practice. The Blues investigate and factorize that the rock's looks is done neatly with a chalk-drawn face and a rope mechanism controlling the arms. They take advantage of this by rearranging its face as a prank to fool him deceivingly. Chuck is dejected when they accidentally make the rock fall off the cliff, prompting the Blues to rescue the rock out of guilt.
| 65 | 13 | "Chuck Mania" | Juanma Sanchez Cervantes | Ian Carney | 11 January 2015 |
While Chuck guards the nest, Foreman Pig sends some Minion Pigs who claim to be his fans and request his autograph. Foreman Pig tries to steal the eggs, but is brought with Chuck to Pig City. While Chuck becomes a celebrity and goes on a talk show, Foreman keeps trying to steal the eggs to no avail. Meanwhile, Red discovers the empty nest and interrupts the show, where he also unexpectedly becomes a celebrity as well, which he doesn't notice.
| 66 | 14 | "Not Without My Helmet" | Juanma Sanchez Cervantes | Valérie Chappellet | 18 January 2015 |
During an attempt to steal the eggs, Corporal Pig loses his helmet to the birds. After being shunned by the other pigs, he goes to retrieve his helmet back.
| 67 | 15 | "Mona Litha" | Thomas Lepeska | Glenn Dakin | 25 January 2015 |
Chuck goes on a dinner date, with his girlfriend being a triangular-shaped rock with a wig and a painted-on face. Even though Chuck acts as both the waiter and the patron, the date does not go as planned.
| 68 | 16 | "Sir Bomb of Hamelot" | Juanma Sanchez Cervantes | Glenn Dakin and Anastasia Heinzl | 1 February 2015 |
Bomb enters a medieval jousting tournament held by the pigs to get the grand prize, only to find his opponent both is possibly stronger and also has his eye on the prize.
| 69 | 17 | "Bearded Ambition" | Juanma Sanchez Cervantes | Ian Carney | 8 February 2015 |
King Pig see pictures and statues of his forefathers, and when he sees their beards, he wants to grow one, too. He grows a very long beard using an instant hair-growth solution developed by Professor Pig and is lauded by his minions, who also get beards from Professor Pig too but trouble arises when he tries to get on with his usual activities.
| 70 | 18 | "Cold Justice" | Jose Guzman and Eric Bastier | Stuart Kenworthy | 15 February 2015 |
Matilda is a big fan of an ice hockey team, putting on a pig nose in order to attend the event. When the rival team's ringer injures the star player, Matilda becomes angry when the rival team taunts him and score a bunch of goals. Matilda takes it upon herself to play in the star's place and mount a comeback.
| 71 | 19 | "Slow the Chuck Down!" | Thomas Lepeska | Richard Preddy | 22 February 2015 |
When Chuck unintentionally destroys Matilda's garden with his supersonic speed, Matilda forces him to act slowly to fix the damages. Chuck takes it to heart, but smugly decides to move so slowly that the pigs are able to steal the eggs before he finishes.
| 72 | 20 | "Brutal vs. Brutal" | Thomas Lepeska | Glenn Dakin | 1 March 2015 |
After a small mistake ruins the pigs' tea party while Chuck is playing with a pair of nunchaku, Chuck and a bodybuilder pig face off in the fight of the year. They overwork themselves while training, thus making them both too worn out to compete.
| 73 | 21 | "Eating Out" | Eric Bastier and Juan Pedro Alcaide | Chris Sadler | 8 March 2015 |
When Matilda takes a break at a beach-side resort, Red, Chuck, and Bomb are left to fend for themselves; none of them are able to cook. They try to steal King Pig's food, which is eaten by Matilda when she returns.
| 74 | 22 | "The Great Eggscape" | Juanma Sanchez Cervantes | Ian Carney | 15 March 2015 |
King Pig is finally given one of the eggs, but Red shows up and easily overpowers the guards. King consults with his secret service agent pig, who devises some obstacles for Red as well as an escape plan, but Red does not stop getting past the obstacles and catching up to King.
| 75 | 23 | "Sleep Like a Hog" | Thomas Lepeska | Ian Carney | 22 March 2015 |
King Pig has a severe case of insomnia. The pigs try all sorts of methods to have him fall asleep, while Corporal Pig suggests knocking him out with a mallet.
| 76 | 24 | "Bombina" | Juanma Sanchez Cervantes | Valérie Chappellet | 29 March 2015 |
Bomb thinks he has met his soulmate, which is actually a bunch of decoy bombs manufactured by the pigs. They become lax while they manufacture the decoys, and Bomb soon gets his own revenge.
| 77 | 25 | "Pig Possessed" | Thomas Lepeska | Stuart Kenworthy | 5 April 2015 |
While wildly rummaging down the town's streets on a feeding spree, King Pig accidentally swallows a witch's ingredients after he collides and gobbles up everything along with his hut. As he chokes on it, the other pigs think he has been possessed by a demon, hiring a witch doctor pig to cure him.
| 78 | 26 | "Epic Sax-Off" | Juan Pedro Alcaide and Eric Bastier | Agnès Slimovici | 12 April 2015 |
Matilda tries her new saxophone, but is soon challenged by a rival pig saxophonist who is jealous of the attention she is getting. They hold a competition with gradually-elevating effects.

=== Season 3 (2015–16) ===
| No. overall | No. in series | Title | Directed by | Written by | Original release date |
|---|---|---|---|---|---|
| 79 | 1 | "Royal Heist" | Juanma Sanchez Cervantes | Mike de Sève, Mike Setaro and Joe Vitale | 1 October 2015 |
When a pig buys an egg-shaped piece of jewellery that King Pig was admiring, the latter and two of his Minions break into his manor to steal it. The following day, King Pig realises that the jewellery is not at all rare, making the entire heist pointless.
| 80 | 2 | "Bad Hair Day" | Eric Bastier | Glenn Dakin | 2 October 2015 |
The Blues paint Chuck's hair tufts white as a prank, making him believe that has become elderly, but the Blues are soon forced to reveal the truth when the pigs arrive.
| 81 | 3 | "Golditrotters" | Tatu Pohjavirta, Eric Bastier and Juanma Sanchez Cervantes | Ian Carney | 2 October 2015 |
King Pig asks Chancellor Pig for a bedtime story, specifically requesting a scary book. Chancellor refuses, instead opting for a parody of Goldilocks and the Three Bears, which the king doesn't like, not expecting a scary ending.
| 82 | 4 | "A Fistful of Cabbage" | Tatu Pohjavirta and Thomas Lepeska | Joe Vitale | 16 October 2015 |
Inspired by his comics, King Pig tries to become a cowboy, but arrests pigs for minor mistakes and is put to the test when real robbers arrive.
| 83 | 5 | "Porcula" | Juanma Sanchez Cervantes | Javier Valdez | 23 October 2015 |
Count Porcula, the vampire pig, emerges and tries to steal the pigs' blood, but trick-or-treating Bubbles is not afraid of him and repeatedly foils his schemes.
| 84 | 6 | "Didgeridork" | Thomas Lepeska | Dave Benjoya and Mike De Seve | 23 October 2015 |
Chuck tries to entertain the Blues while on a camping trip, but every time Bomb does the same, the Blues find the latter more interesting each time.
| 85 | 7 | "The Porktrait" | Thomas Lepeska and Eric Bastier | Ian Carney | 30 October 2015 |
King Pig wants a self-portrait like the ones of his ancestors, which turns out to be more difficult than he thought.
| 86 | 8 | "Fix It!" | Marcus Wagenführ and Juanma Sanchez Cervantes | Stuart Kenworthy | 13 November 2015 |
Chuck breaks the slingshot, which Terence disapproves of. Threatened, Chuck attempts to fix it while showing off to the ominous Terence.
| 87 | 9 | "Age Rage" | Juanma Sanchez Cervantes and Thomas Lepeska | Stuart Kenworthy | 26 November 2015 |
Professor Pig fails brewing a youth potion, as it instead grants age instead of use. Corporal Pig uses this against Red, Chuck, and Bomb, allowing him to steal the eggs. However, when he and his two Minion Pigs fire a gun salute, they too become elderly. The pigs return with the birds' tea set due to their damaged eyesight.
| 88 | 10 | "Catching The Blues" | Eric Bastier | Nedra Gallegos and Mike De Seve | 10 December 2015 |
Foreman Pig tries to catch one of the Blues with his traps to get the eggs, unaware that they are triplets. The Blues use Foreman's obliviousness against him by escaping every trap each time.
| 89 | 11 | "Last Tree Standing" | Juanma Sanchez Cervantes | Jeff Hand | 17 December 2015 |
The birds and King Pig find the perfect tree for Christmas, proceeding to fight over it.
| 90 | 12 | "Happy Hippy" | Tatu Pohjavirta and Eric Bastier | Glenn Dakin | 25 December 2015 |
Matilda has a hard time calming down Red, who is in a very angry mood after an attack from the pigs. Matilda sends Red into a trance to get him to be peaceful, only for the latter to keep destroying his surroundings in a blind rage.
| 91 | 13 | "Mind The Pony" | Eric Bastier | Glenn Dakin | 8 January 2016 |
Chuck and Bomb rescue the eggs from Corporal Pig in the heart of Pig City, destroying their surroundings in the process. The three are punished when they accidentally break a small piglet's toy, being forced to repair the damage.
| 92 | 14 | "Robo-Tilda" | Kaisa Penttilä and Thomas Lepeska | Joe Vitale | 22 January 2016 |
Matilda gets kidnapped by pigs, sending a robot replica of her to the nest to get the eggs.
| 93 | 15 | "King of the Ring" | Thomas Lepeska | Joe Vitale | 5 February 2016 |
Inspired by his toys, King Pig decides to participate in a wrestling match.
| 94 | 16 | "Spaced Out" | Tatu Pohjavirta, Thomas Lepeska and Eric Bastier | Javier Valdez | 19 February 2016 |
While on a camping trip, The Blues prank Chuck by pretending to be aliens, which Red does not believe. Chuck eventually sees through the prank, but trouble arises when real aliens arrive and abduct an unsuspecting Red. Note: The music in this episode was reused for the Angry Birds Seasons episode "Invasion Of The Egg Snatchers".
| 95 | 17 | "Battling Butlers" | Tatu Pohjavirta, Juanma Sanchez Cervantes and Kim Helminen | Glenn Dakin | 4 March 2016 |
The new teen butler is about to replace the King Pig's most trusted old butler, outdoing all of the old butler's ways.
| 96 | 18 | "Eggshaustion" | Tatu Pohjavirta and Thomas Lepeska | Christopher Panzner | 18 March 2016 |
Chuck sees that the eggs have been stolen, but Bomb does not seem to care. He tries to rescue them despite the pigs stealing more eggs again and again, only to find out it was all a prank for the pigs orchestrated by Bomb, who rescued the real eggs, that Chuck accidentally fell for.
| 97 | 19 | "Short and Special" | Eric Bastier | Stuart Kenworthy | 25 March 2016 |
Two piggies enter a queue for an amusement ride. However, the guard at the entrance does not let the smaller one in due to a size requirement. The two try few tricks to go together on the ride, but the guard keeps backfiring them.
| 98 | 20 | "Hocus Porcus" | Juanma Sanchez Cervantes | Jeff Hand | 1 April 2016 |
When a magician accidentally makes King Pig disappear after he tries to find a cake that the magician made it disappear in his magic closet, he tries various tricks to get him back.
| 99 | 21 | "Romance in a Bottle" | Thomas Lepeska | Jeff Hand | 8 April 2016 |
Matilda and King Pig think that they are receiving gifts in a bottle from their dream soulmate, but later realise the truth in their mystery date.
| 100 | 22 | "The Butler Did It!" | Eric Bastier | Glenn Dakin | 15 April 2016 |
King Pig watches a mystery film, only for the film to be burnt right before the detective reveals the murderer in the film. To make up for it, he re-enacts a crime scene as the detective, repeatedly pointing to the wrong suspect despite the clues. A pig from outside the castle soon calls the police, believing that the scenario is real. When an officer investigates, King Pig accuses himself of being the murderer.
| 101 | 23 | "Stalker" | Thomas Lepeska | Glenn Dakin | 22 April 2016 |
When King Pig messily eats a hot dog at a hot dog stand, the pig running the stand begins to stalk him with a menacing stare. Eventually, it is revealed that he was only stalking King Pig due to there being a hot dog stain on his back.
| 102 | 24 | "Photochucked" | Juanma Sanchez Cervantes | Richard Preddy | 29 April 2016 |
Matilda tries to take photographs of her garden, only for Chuck to repeatedly photobomb every picture.
| 103 | 25 | "Bake On!" | Tatu Pohjavirta and Thomas Lepeska | Stuart Kenworthy | 6 May 2016 |
Chef Pig teaches a class to make delicious cakes for King Pig, but he is shocked to find out that the king prefers the student pigs' ruined ones.
| 104 | 26 | "Toy Hoggers" | Kim Helminen | Christopher Panzner | 13 May 2016 |
King Pig throws away his old teddy after receiving a new one, but becomes guilty that night. When he goes back to retrieve it, he finds that Terence has taken it. The king orders his assistants to negotiate deals with Terence involving swapping the teddy for something else. Terence accepts to return the teddy after being offered a plush toy of him. Note: The plush toy of Terence seen at the end resembles the character's design as seen in The Angry Birds Movie.
