= Piggy Tales =

Finnish animated television series

- Title card for first season
- Genre: Comedy
- Created by: Eric Guaglione; Ville Lepisto
- Based on: Bad Piggies by Rovio Entertainment
- Voices of: Antti Pääkkönen; Antti L. J. Pääkkönen
- Opening theme: "Piggy Tales"
- Composer: Douglas Black Heaton
- Country of origin: Finland
- No. of seasons: 4
- No. of episodes: 122

Production
- Producers: Ville Lepisto; Ulla Junell; Joonas Rissanen
- Running time: 1–2 minutes
- Production company: Rovio Animation

Original release
- Network: Toons.TV (2014–17); YouTube (2017–19)
- Release: 17 April 2014 – 30 May 2019

Related
- Angry Birds Stella; Angry Birds Toons; Angry Birds Blues; Angry Birds: Summer Madness; Angry Birds Mystery Island

Piggy Tales is a Finnish animated television series based on Bad Piggies, a spin-off of Angry Birds. Animated in a style resembling clay animation before transitioning into computer-generated imagery after the release of The Angry Birds Movie, the series focuses on the life of the Minion Pigs with no dialogue. It was produced by Rovio Entertainment and distributed by Sony Pictures Television, with the French studio Cube Creative providing some of the animation.

Piggy Tales premiered in 2014 on the Toons.TV channel through the Angry Birds applications and on the Toons.TV website. The series continued by the second season, subtitled Pigs at Work in 2015; the third season, subtitled Third Act in 2016; and the fourth and final season, subtitled 4th Street in 2018, making it the longest-running Angry Birds television series.

== Episodes ==
=== Series overview ===
| Series | Title | Episodes | Originally released | |
| Series | Title | Episodes | First released | Last released |
|---|---|---|---|---|
| 1 | Piggy Tales | 31 | 17 April 2014 | 31 March 2015 |
| 2 | Pigs at Work | 26 | 17 April 2015 | 1 March 2016 (DVD); 17 February 2017 |
| 3 | Third Act | 34 | 3 June 2016 | 3 February 2017 |
| 4 | 4th Street | 30 | 20 October 2017 | 22 December 2017 (DVD); 30 May 2019 |

=== Season 1 (2014–15) ===
| No. overall | No. in season | Title | Directed by | Written by | Original release date |
|---|---|---|---|---|---|
| 1 | 1 | "Trampoline" | Erkki Lilja | Antoine Vignon & Erkki Lilja | 17 April 2014 |
A Minion Pig wanders into a room with a trampoline. But the trampoline is inaccessible because there is a sign prohibiting pigs from jumping on the trampoline. The pig makes sure nobody is watching him, so he jumps onto the trampoline, but he does not seem to bounce. He repeatedly and angrily attempts to get himself to bounce.
| 2 | 2 | "Rough Necks" | Chris Sadler | Chris Sadler | 24 April 2014 |
A construction pig climbs a makeshift spiral staircase to work on top of a tower of crates.
| 3 | 3 | "Abduction" | Erkki Lilja | Erkki Lilja | 30 April 2014 |
A small spaceship lands next to the big pig and a tiny alien pig comes out of it. The tiny alien pig converses with the big pig, who then starts laughing, but then the tiny pig gets back in his spaceship and flies it into the big pig's mouth. The big pig's eyes glow and it starts floating and flies off.
| 4 | 4 | "Teeter Trotter" | Rémi Chapotot | Rémi Chapotot | 8 May 2014 |
Two pigs are on a seesaw, but one of the pigs is too big to move. The small pig tries various schemes to help lift the big pig up.
| 5 | 5 | "The Hole" | Chris Sadler | Chris Sadler | 15 May 2014 |
Two pig peers over a hole in the ground that acts like a vertical wind tunnel, constantly pushing air up. The pigs jump on the hole and hover, until the air stops blowing and they fall. When they get to the bottom, they have fun with their echoes. Note: The Pigs in this episode also appear as a cameo in Slingshot Stories.
| 6 | 6 | "Push Button" | Rémi Chapotot | Rémi Chapotot | 22 May 2014 |
A pig pushes a button on a box, which makes a sound and then a crashing noise. The pig finds this very amusing and pushes it several times until he gets bored. He walks around and discovers a bunch of pigs that have been smashed in on the ground. Then he hears the sound and a weight from above almost smashes him. He dodges several of these, then chuckles, but then he got smashed in as another pig has pushed the button. After that, laughing sounds can be heard and the button smashes him.
| 7 | 7 | "The Mirror" | Rémi Chapotot | Rémi Chapotot | 29 May 2014 |
A pig poses in front of a wood-framed mirror.
| 8 | 8 | "Super Glue" | JP Saari | JP Saari | 5 June 2014 |
A pig picks a rolled up tube of super glue. When another pig arrives, the first pig drops the tube and leaves but the second pig is attached to the back of the first pig. Another pig comes and ends up attached to the pigs. More pigs do the same and they end up having to act like an inchworm to move around.
| 9 | 9 | "Piggy in the Middle" | Chris Sadler | Chris Sadler | 12 June 2014 |
Two pigs are heading a soccer ball back and forth. A third pig wants to join in but is found in the middle.
| 10 | 10 | "Epic Sir Bucket" | Erkki Lilja | Erkki Lilja | 19 June 2014 |
A pig wearing a bucket for a helmet swings around a wooden sword pretending to be in a sword fight when he bumps into an anvil suspended in midair by a balloon. At first he pokes around the bottom of the anvil but nothing happens. Then he stands on the anvil and cuts the string from the balloon but nothing happens. Then the balloon falls on him with the force of the anvil and smashes him, and then pops.
| 11 | 11 | "Push Button Trouble!" | Rémi Chapotot | Rémi Chapotot | 26 June 2014 |
A pig finds a push button, this time on the top of a crate. After several attempts, he jumps on top and lands on the button, but the entire floor rotates at different angles. He struggles to climb back to push the button several more times until the side of the crate with the button falls to the floor, causing the floor to go on different angles constantly, causing the pig to panic. Eventually, the "floor" with the crate is the ceiling, and the pig, after regaining consciousness, giggled, but then the crate falls on him, causing the button to be pushed once more, and send the whole place spinning.
| 12 | 12 | "Sha-Zam!" | Rémi Chapotot | Rémi Chapotot | 3 July 2014 |
Two pigs take turns using a magic wand to transform each other into different objects and then back to normal.
| 13 | 13 | "Puffed Up" | Chris Sadler | Chris Sadler & David Vinicombe | 10 July 2014 |
Two pigs take turns taking a deep breath and holding it, puffing themselves up to see which pig is bigger. When one of the pigs puffs himself up to an enormous size.
| 14 | 14 | "Peekaboo!" | Rémi Chapotot | Rémi Chapotot | 17 July 2014 |
Two pigs are hanging out by a crate. One of them nudges the other to play hide and seek, but after the first one does the count, the second one has not moved.
| 15 | 15 | "Up or Down?" | Ville Lepisto | Ville Lepisto | 24 July 2014 |
A pig pushes a button for an elevator, but neither of the two doors will open, despite the floor indicator arrow moving around and lighting up. After several tries, both elevator doors open: one is full of pigs and the other is empty. After a little bit of thought, the pig begins to laugh, and he joins the elevator full of pigs.
| 16 | 16 | "Gloves" | Rémi Chapotot | Rémi Chapotot | 31 July 2014 |
The pigs find a pair of rubber gloves. The two bigger pigs play with them in all sorts of ways. The third pig inflates them and shows its actual purpose, but the first two pigs disapprove.
| 17 | 17 | "Snooze" | Cesar Chevalier | Cesar Chevalier | 7 August 2014 |
Two pigs are sleeping. When the second one starts snoring, the first one tries to wake him up with all sorts of methods, but nothing works.
| 18 | 18 | "Superpork" | Rémi Chapotot | Rémi Chapotot | 14 August 2014 |
Two masked superhero pigs (resembling Batman and Robin) chase a robber pig, but the robber pig crosses a chasm. The superhero pigs try different schemes to cross the chasm but fail. Note: The Pigs in this episode also appear as a cameo in Slingshot Stories.
| 19 | 19 | "Cake Duel" | Rémi Chapotot | Rémi Chapotot | 21 August 2014 |
A slice of cake on top of a crate attracts two pigs who then duel each other in a sword fight with their tails.
| 20 | 20 | "Dr. Pork, M.D" | JP Saari | JP Saari & Sara Wahl | 28 August 2014 |
A pig doctor treats pigs by using a stethoscope, a hammer for reflexes, and then giving them some medicine on a spoon, and the sick pigs almost immediately become better. It goes well, but runs into trouble when one of his patients is the floating pig who swallowed the alien ship from the previous episode, "Abduction". Note: The Doctor Pig also appears in Slingshot Stories, and checking on the Pig who accidentally got into the dimension of Piggy Tales.
| 21 | 21 | "Hog Hoops" | Rémi Chapotot | Rémi Chapotot | 5 September 2014 |
A pig is playing basketball but stops to complain to the organist who is goofing around on the keys on a circular keyboard. He bounces the organist, thinking that he can use him as a basketball, and throws him into the basket.
| 22 | 22 | "The Cure" | Rémi Chapotot | Rémi Chapotot | 11 September 2014 |
A pig has a drippy nose. A second pig brings a bottle of medicine, but is unable to remove its cork.
| 23 | 23 | "Up the Tempo" | Rémi Chapotot | Rémi Chapotot | 18 September 2014 |
A pig uses a mallet to pound in some nails on a staircase, but the mallet makes funny noises. He discovers another pig who has been making the sound effects with a microphone, and he decides to have some fun with this advantage.
| 24 | 24 | "Jammed" | Sara Wahl | Eric Guaglione & Sara Wahl | 25 September 2014 |
Two pigs try different tools to open a jar of orange jam.
| 25 | 25 | "Fly Piggy, Fly!" | Rémi Chapotot | Rémi Chapotot | 2 October 2014 |
A pig fashions various contraptions out of open crate frames and V8 engines in order to fly.
| 26 | 26 | "The Game" | Ville Lepisto & Janne Roivainen | Ville Lepisto & Janne Roivainen | 9 October 2014 |
Two pigs are playing hexapawn. When the first pig makes a move, the second pig has a hard time figuring what to do.
| 27 | 27 | "The Catch" | JP Saari | JP Saari, Jenny Meissner & Jaakko Stenius | 16 October 2014 |
A pig cuts a hole in the floor to go ice fishing, but his first few casts bring nothing. He changes his bait to different items, but has no luck.
| 28 | 28 | "Snowed Up" | Cesar Chevalier and Chris Sadler | Chris Sadler and David Vinicombe | 16 December 2014 |
A pig gets his tongue stuck on a giant snowpig, and tries to get it off.
| 29 | 29 | "The Wishing Well" | Cesar Chevalier | Erkki Lilja | 17 March 2015 |
Two pigs find a wishing well that creates endless duplicates of whatever is dropped in it.
| 30 | 30 | "Stuck In?" | Cesar Chevalier | Gonzalo Diaz-Palacios & Cesar Chevalier | 24 March 2015 |
A pig finds a sword in the stone but is unable to pull it out. Other pigs join to help, but no luck.
| 31 | 31 | "It's a Wrap" | JP Saari | Joonas Rissanen & JP Saari | 31 March 2015 |
The pigs clean up and put away the props of the first season.

=== Season 2: Pigs at Work (2015–17) ===
The second season focuses on pigs as they do "pigstruction" work.

| No. overall | No. in season | Title | Directed by | Written by | Original release date |
|---|---|---|---|---|---|
| 32 | 1 | "Nailed It!" | Fabien Weibel | Fabien Weibel | 17 April 2015 |
A construction pig tries to keep a nail in a wall from sticking out while he sleeps, but it also keeps doing the same thing to another pig whose nail is on the other side as well.
| 33 | 2 | "Lunch Break" | Philippe Rolland | Philippe Rolland | 24 April 2015 |
Two pigs are hammering in a nail when the lunch horn sounds. As they eat, they discover another pig about to saw off the beam they are sitting on. One of the pigs eating lunch offered him a chainsaw to speed up the sawing.
| 34 | 3 | "Screw Up" | Philippe Rolland | Philippe Rolland | 1 May 2015 |
The pigs use balloons to fly over to each of the screws they have to install. But when one of the balloons pops, they start descending at a rapid rate and must find a way to drop their weight.
| 35 | 4 | "Pile Up" | Fabien Weibel | Fabien Weibel | 8 May 2015 |
Two pigs try to build a tall structure using boxes, but one of the pigs has been pulling the boxes from the bottom to bring them to the top.
| 36 | 5 | "Step 1" | Fabien Weibel | Fabien Weibel | 15 May 2015 |
The pigs try to build something following an instruction sheet.
| 37 | 6 | "Jackhammered!" | Philippe Rolland | Philippe Rolland | 22 May 2015 |
A pig is working with a jackhammer, but cannot know where danger is in his path, let alone know since he is wearing headphones.
| 38 | 7 | "Race Nut" | Philippe Rolland | Philippe Rolland | 29 May 2015 |
The pigs are building vehicles for a race, but do not want to use the rocket, suggested by another pig. So, the other pig decides to make use of what he has to win.
| 39 | 8 | "Predicament in Paint" | Philippe Rolland | Philippe Rolland | 5 June 2015 |
A pig literally paints himself into a corner. He tries several ways to get out, but makes a bigger mess of green and white paint.
| 40 | 9 | "Get the Hammer" | Fabien Weibel | Fabien Weibel | 12 June 2015 |
Three pigs compete in a game show to fetch hammers suspended from the ceiling.
| 41 | 10 | "Fabulous Fluke" | Fabien Weibel | Fabien Weibel | 19 June 2015 |
A pig has a hard time hammering in nails, so when he tosses away his hammer, it sets off a Goldberg machine-like chain reaction.
| 42 | 11 | "Magnetic Appeal" | Philippe Rolland | Philippe Rolland | 26 June 2015 |
The pigs need a screwdriver, but the toolbox is on a block out of reach. They use a magnet to try to pull the box over, but it turns out to be super powerful and it begins to pull everything else as well.
| 43 | 12 | "Porkatron" | Philippe Rolland | Philippe Rolland | 3 July 2015 |
A pig falls into a crate with glue and emerges stuck in the frame of a unstoppable makeshift robot suit. He tries to be useful in his job, but with not much help. Despite this, the other pigs adore him and they assemble and also use the same method to make robot suits of their own as well.
| 44 | 13 | "Grand Opening" | Fabien Weibel | Fabien Weibel | 10 July 2015 |
A mayor pig holds ribbon cutting ceremonies for newly built structures.
| 45 | 14 | "Lights Out" | Philippe Rolland | Philippe Rolland | 17 July 2015 |
While three pigs are working on their construction projects, a light bulb for the area flickers and goes out, leaving them in the dark. It lights but goes dark again. The pigs take advantage of the dark to goof off until the light is on again in which they show they are working.
| 46 | 15 | "Tipping Point" | Philippe Rolland | Philippe Rolland | 24 July 2015 |
Two pigs and an anvil are on a wooden beam that is being lifted. When the anvil shifts, the two pigs must scramble to balance.
| 47 | 16 | "All Geared Up" | Philippe Rolland | Philippe Rolland | 30 July 2015 |
A black-and-white film shows a worker pig is working on an assembly line, trying to put parts involving a wheel and a board together. The conveyor belt goes faster with more parts until the worker is exhausted.
| 48 | 17 | "Dream House" | Eric Guaglione | Javier Espinosa | 7 August 2015 |
A pig keeps asking other pigs to construct a dream house, but is not satisfied with the results from each pig.
| 49 | 18 | "Home Sweet Home" | Fabien Weibel | Fabien Weibel | 14 August 2015 |
A pig draws up a 3D-model of a house, but finds it too hard to make.
| 50 | 19 | "Mind The Gap" | Eric Guaglione | Juanma Sanchez Cervantes | 21 August 2015 |
Two pigs build a bridge across a gap.
| 51 | 20 | "Unhinged" | Fabien Weibel | Ami Lindholm | 28 August 2015 |
A pig finds it hard to open his lunchbox.
| 52 | 21 | "Sticky Situation" | Fabien Weibel | Fabien Weibel | 4 September 2015 |
A pig discovers he and his stuff are glued to the bottom of a building beam high above the others.
| 53 | 22 | "Final Exam" | Fabien Weibel | Fabien Weibel | 11 September 2015 |
A pig is evaluated for various construction skills.
| 54 | 23 | "Three Little Piggies" | Philippe Roland | Philippe Roland | 18 September 2015 |
The pigs parody the story of the three little pigs.
| 55 | 24 | "Board to Pieces" | Eric Guaglione | Eric Guaglione | 25 September 2015 |
A pig nails a board to a wall. He takes another plank and nails that on the same wall until it forms a stack. When he runs out of boards, he gets an idea of sawing off the wall on the other side, and nails that to the wall. However, the entire thing starts to topple over as all the pigs have done the same thing in the tower.
| 56 | 25 | "Demohogs" | Eric Guaglione | Stefano Camelli | 1 March 2016 (DVD); 10 February 2017 |
The pigs must destroy a tall, white block in order to make room to plant a flower next to a house.
| 57 | 26 | "Swine Symphony" | Eric Guaglione | Eric Guaglione and Stefano Camelli | 1 March 2016 (DVD); 17 February 2017 |
The pigs find that the sound effects they make while working seem to make music, creating a "swine symphony". Note: This is the final episode where the piggies are in stop-motion animation.

A special episode based on the Goosebumps film was released after the series' end on 10 February 2016 in the Angry Birds' official YouTube channel.

=== Season 3: Third Act (2016–17) ===
The third season of Piggy Tales is subtitled "Third Act". Consisting of a total of 34 1-minute episodes, the season's main themes are: "Summer Sports", "Back to School", "Halloween", and "Happy Holidays". All episodes are set in a theatre in downtown Pig City (as seen in The Angry Birds Movie), showing pigs as they "rehearse and horse around on-stage." The first episode premiered on 3 June 2016 on the iOS and Android app of Toons.TV, followed by the release on the Toons.TV YouTube channel on 5 June 2016. The last episode was released on 5 February 2017. The pigs' design is based on that of their design in The Angry Birds Movie. With the introduction of this new season came a shift in the art style from claymation to computer-generated imagery.

| No. overall | No. in season | Title | Directed by | Written by | Original release date |
|---|---|---|---|---|---|
| 58 | 0 | "Wrong Floor" | Meruan Salim | Meruan Salim, Kim Helminen and Sara Wahl | 3 June 2016 |
At the pig theater, an elevator appears and opens up to a pig inside, who was at the wrong place. He tries to push the button to close the elevator door, but shortly afterwards, it keeps opening again. Note: This is the first appearance of the piggies in 3D. This was also known as a teaser for the third season.
| 59 | 1 | "Bouncing Buffoon" | Meruan Salim | Meruan Salim, Kim Helminen and Sara Wahl | 10 June 2016 |
A pig plays with a balloon in the air.
| 60 | 2 | "Up the Ladder" | Meruan Salim | Meruan Salim | 17 June 2016 |
A pig tries to fix the light bulbs of the stage but they keep going out despite his efforts.
| 61 | 3 | "Sharpest Shooter" | Meruan Salim | Meruan Salim | 24 June 2016 |
Three pigs compete in trying to hit an apple atop another pig's head.
| 62 | 4 | "Snack Time" | Thomas Lepeska | Duncan Rochfort | 1 July 2016 |
A janitor pig uses his only coin to buy the only chocolate bar in the vending machine. But it gets stuck, and the pig tries different methods to take it out.
| 63 | 5 | "Batter Up" | Meruan Salim | Duncan Rochfort | 8 July 2016 |
The Chef Pig shows his pancake cooking and flipping skills. But every time he flips it up, it doesn't come down.
| 64 | 6 | "Magic Matchup" | Arnaud Janvier and Francois Dufour | Arnaud Janvier and Francois Dufour | 22 July 2016 |
Two magician pigs do a competitive 'magic' show. Who will impress the audience?
| 65 | 7 | "The Bubble Trick" | Arnaud Janvier and Francois Dufour | Arnaud Janvier and Francois Dufour | 29 July 2016 |
A pig was blowing bubbles from his nose, and the second pig watches it. The pig sneezed and ended up in a indestructible bubble. So the second pig tries to pop him out of the bubble.
| 66 | 8 | "Piggy Dive" | Thomas Lepeska | Thomas Lepeska, Meruan Salim, Stefano Camelli, Duncan Rochfort and Joonas Rissanen | 5 August 2016 |
A pig tries to overcome his fear of heights while trying to do a high dive.
| 67 | 9 | "One Big Hurdle" | Meruan Salim | Joonas Rissanen | 12 August 2016 |
An athletic pig tries to jump over the hurdles, and he's one step far for a giant leap.
| 68 | 10 | "Piggy Vaulting" | Thomas Lepeska | Thomas Lepeska | 19 August 2016 |
An athletic pig tries to do a high jump, but the harder he tries, the harder he fell.
| 69 | 11 | "Art School" | Arnaud Janvier, Francois Dufour | Arnaud Janvier, Francois Dufour | 26 August 2016 |
A pig tries to draw someone's portrait, but he lacks in creative skill.
| 70 | 12 | "Chalk It Up" | Meruan Salim | Meruan Salim | 2 September 2016 |
Two pigs got in a fight when they can't adjust the blackboard to their preference, but got themselves a mind blowing end.
| 71 | 13 | "School's Up" | Meruan Salim | Meruan Salim | 9 September 2016 |
A pig wants to play on the swing, but it won't even budge until a friend came to help him out.
| 72 | 14 | "Broken Chair" | Arnaurd Janvier, Francois Dufour | Arnaurd Janvier, Francois Dufour | 16 September 2016 |
The janitor pig broke the chair, so the mechanic triplet pigs came to fix it.
| 73 | 15 | "Hidden Talent" | Arnaurd Janvier, Francois Dufour | Arnaurd Janvier, Francois Dufour | 23 September 2016 |
A janitor pig accidentally drops on the stage, so he showcasts his hidden talent.
| 74 | 16 | "Hiccups" | Arnaurd Janvier, Francois Dufour | Arnaurd Janvier, Francois Dufour | 30 September 2016 |
A pig got hiccups while performing his show, so another pig tries to stop it.
| 75 | 17 | "Let's Tango" | Thomas Lepeska, Meruan Salim | Duncan Rochfort | 7 October 2016 |
The tango pig struggles to dance with his clumsy partner as he always steps on his foot.
| 76 | 18 | "Scared Sick" | Meruan Salim | Duncan Rochfort | 14 October 2016 |
Vampire Pig is hungry but his flu can't keep him from approaching the sleeping pig.
| 77 | 19 | "Shadow Pig" | Arnaud Janvier, Francois Dufour | Arnaud Janvier, Francois Dufour | 21 October 2016 |
Two pigs does a shadow play, but the audience doesn't find it scary enough.
| 78 | 20 | "Pumpkin Head" | Meruan Salim | Duncan Rochfort | 28 October 2016 |
A pig gets his head stuck in a pumpkin while carving a jack-o-lantern, so the second pig tries to take it out.
| 79 | 21 | "For Pig's Sake" | Thomas Lepeska, Meruan Salim | Thomas Lepeska | 4 November 2016 |
A pig gets the worst seat in the theater and is now stuck to it. He struggles to get off of it.
| 80 | 22 | "Remote Pig" | Meruan Salim | Duncan Rochfort | 11 November 2016 |
A pigbot malfunctions and his master struggles to fix him.
| 81 | 23 | "Pig Interrupted" | Meruan Salim | Duncan Rochfort | 18 November 2016 |
An opera pig is ready to do the performance. But the problem is, the mic is always dropping.
| 82 | 24 | "Light Dance" | Arnaud Janvier, François Dufour | Arnaud Janvier, François Dufour | 25 November 2016 |
The pigs have done a very impressive light dance performance! But something does not feel right.
| 83 | 25 | "Pig Expectations" | Thomas Lepeska, Meruan Salim | Duncan Rochfort | 2 December 2016 |
A jealous pig gets what he deserves when he tries to swap presents.
| 84 | 26 | "Gift Wrapped" | Meruan Salim | Duncan Rochfort | 9 December 2016 |
A festive pig gets into a sticky situation while wrapping a present.
| 85 | 27 | "Holiday Song" | Meruan Salim | Kim Helminen | 16 December 2016 |
It's Christmas Eve, but things won't go much better for this angel pig.
| 86 | 28 | "Lost Piggy" | Thomas Lepeska, Meruan Salim | Duncan Rochfort | 23 December 2016 |
The opera pig is having a performance, but this lost piggy is in desperate need in directions.
| 87 | 29 | "The Mime" | Meruan Salim, Thomas Lepiska | Duncan Rochfort | 30 December 2016 |
Mime Pig meets his match with a plucky member of the audience.
| 88 | 30 | "Snout on the Wall" | Arnaud Janvier, François Dufour | Arnaud Janvier, François Dufour | 6 January 2017 |
This curious pig just wants to blend in the background.
| 89 | 31 | "Re-Abduction" | Meruan Salim | Duncan Rochfort | 13 January 2017 |
The alien pig returns, but this time, he gets more than he bargained for.
| 90 | 32 | "Ball Games" | Meruan Salim | Meruan Salim | 20 January 2017 |
A pig is having a bouncy ball disturbance while practicing his dialogs.
| 91 | 33 | "Slip Up" | Meruan Salim | Meruan Salim | 27 January 2017 |
A pig sees a warning sign that the stage floor is slippery, and finds it to be true, even with different methods.
| 92 | 34 | "Final Curtain" | Meruan Salim | Duncan Rochfort | 3 February 2017 |
It's the end of the season, and all the piggies clean up and put away the Piggy Tales signboard and props from every episode. They also put the time bombs too as well, which then explode and destroys the backstage wall, revealing Pig City (after which the series continues as 4th Street).

=== Season 4: 4th Street (2018–19) ===
A fourth and final season, titled 4th Street, and consisting of 30 episodes, will take place "on a street corner in Pig City where the loveable pigs put a comical spin on everyday situations." Despite plans to release it sometime in 2017, this season was delayed to 2018.

Despite this delay, Rovio later released a special Halloween-themed sneak-peek episode of the season, titled "Scary Fog", on 21 October 2017, as part of the Angry Birds' 2017 Halloween celebration, on the Angry Birds YouTube channel. A later one, called Holiday Heist, was released on 16 December 2017, as the franchise celebrated Christmas. Around that time, however, the complete season of Piggy Tales: 4th Street and all of its episodes were released early during December 2017 on iTunes in Piggy Tales Vol. 7 & Piggy Tales Vol. 8 and on DVD in Piggy Tales: The Complete 4th Season. These early releases on DVD & iTunes happened even before the beginning of 2018, as well as the planned schedule for all of the series' episodes to be uploaded in the Angry Birds YouTube channel in 2018. The official release for the series was 10 February 2018, starting with Pig City Valentine.

| No. overall | No. in season | Title | Directed by | Written by | Original release date |
|---|---|---|---|---|---|
| 93 | 1 | "Scary Fog" | Arnaud Janvier, François Dufour | Arnaud Janvier, François Dufour | 20 October 2017 |
After gathering a lot of candy from trick-or-treating on 4th Street, a pig stumbles across a foreboding gate filled with fog and decides to enter, only to get the nightmarish fright of his life. Note: This was also known as a teaser trailer for the fourth season.
| 94 | 2 | "Holiday Heist" | Meruan Salim | Duncan Rochfort | 16 December 2017 |
A thief pig steals presents that Santa Claus was dropping under a tree in the early hours of Christmas Day, but he is caught in the act and is danger of being put on the "naughty list". Note: This is also a second teaser episode for the fourth season.
| 95 | 3 | "Pig City Valentine" | Meruan Salim | Joonas Rissanen | 10 February 2018 |
A cupid pig gives out Valentine cards to fellow pigs to celebrate Valentine's Day, but is saddened to discover that no one has given him one in return.
| 96 | 4 | "Road Hog" | Arnaud Janvier, François Dufour | Arnaud Janvier, François Dufour | 24 February 2018 |
Two pigs get ready for a street race but it does not go the way anyone would expect it to go.
| 97 | 5 | "Slingshot Delivery" | Meruan Salim | Chris Sadler | 10 March 2018 |
A delivery pig carries a parcel to its destination but cannot find a way to put it through the mail slot. So he resorts to some ridiculous ideas, one which involves a slingshot. Note: Red, Chuck, and Bomb make a cameo appearance when the delivery pig steals the slingshot.
| 98 | 6 | "Bad Signal" | Meruan Salim | Chris Sadler | 17 March 2018 |
Two pigs seek a way to boost the signal of their radio so that they could listen to music.
| 99 | 7 | "Egg Hunt" | Arnaud Janvier, François Dufour | Duncan Rochfort | 24 March 2018 |
On Easter, a hungry pig is willing to risk life and limb to collect large chocolate eggs, but suffers humiliating injuries to the point where he no longer looks like a pig.
| 100 | 8 | "Hoop and Loop" | Arnaud Janvier, François Dufour | Arnaud Janvier, François Dufour | 31 March 2018 |
A pig wants to play basketball with another fellow pig, but he appears more interested in demonstrating his incredible shooting skills, rather than playing a pick-up game.
| 101 | 9 | "Cops N' Robbers" | Meruan Salim | Duncan Rochfort | 7 April 2018 |
The thief pig steals some money one night but gets into an outrageous hot pursuit through the city by a police pig, which culminates into an unexpected twist.
| 102 | 10 | "Hard Days Light" | Meruan Salim | Chris Sadler | 11 April 2018 |
Two pigs set out to replace the burned-out bulb of a street light, but are unable to reach the bulb.
| 103 | 11 | "Branched Out" | Arnaud Janvier, François Dufour | Arnaud Janvier, François Dufour | 14 April 2018 |
A pig gets stuck atop a tree, and any fellow pig who attempts to rescue him fail, sharing in his predicament.
| 104 | 12 | "Piggin' String" | Arnaud Janvier, François Dufour | Arnaud Janvier, François Dufour | 21 April 2018 |
A determined pig comes to the rescue with his rope wrangling skills.
| 105 | 13 | "Pork Brigade" | Meruan Salim | Duncan Rochfort | 25 April 2018 |
Two pigs from the Pork Brigade firefighting squad set out to put out a fire, but eventually discover that there wasn't one to begin with.
| 106 | 14 | "Getaway Loot" | Meruan Salim | Elia Morettini, Duncan Rochfort, Chris Sadler, Meruan Salim | 28 April 2018 |
The thief pig steals money in broad daylight, but Pig City's police forces are closing on him fast.
| 107 | 15 | "Muffin Master" | Arnaud Janvier, François Dufour | Arnaud Janvier, François Dufour | 12 May 2018 |
A plucky pig tries to distract an old timer on his lunch break.
| 108 | 16 | "Well Done" | Arnaud Janvier, François Dufour | Arnaud Janvier, François Dufour | 19 May 2018 |
One pig will stop at nothing to get a good sun tan.
| 109 | 17 | "Green and Furious" | Meruan Salim | Chris Sadler | 21 July 2018 |
The owner of a luxurious car is about to go for a ride, but he accidentally drops the car keys in a storm drain.
| 110 | 18 | "Dream Dog" | Arnaud Janvier, Francois Dufour | Arnaud Janvier, Francois Dufour | 25 July 2018 |
A hungry pig places a huge order for a dream dog.
| 111 | 19 | "Dodge and Deliver" | Meruan Salim | Chris Sadler, Duncan Rochfort, Meruan Salim | 8 September 2018 |
A pig is looking for a way to deliver a package to a building across a busy street.
| 112 | 20 | "Ramp Champ" | Arnaud Janvier, François Dufour | Arnaud Janvier, François Dufour, Meruan Salim | 29 September 2018 |
A tenacious pig will stop at nothing to become the next ramp champ.
| 113 | 21 | "Ghost Hog" | Meruan Salim | Duncan Rochfort | 27 October 2018 |
Ghost Hog struggles to master his ride from Hell.
| 114 | 22 | "Slam Dunk" | Meruan Salim | Duncan Rochfort, Meruan Salim | 8 November 2018 |
A greedy ball hog gets his comeuppance on the court.
| 115 | 23 | "Joyful Jingle" | Arnaud Janvier, François Dufour | Arnaud Janvier, François Dufour | 12 December 2018 |
A group of resourceful pigs celebrate the festive season in style after all the lamp bulbs go out.
| 116 | 24 | "Happy New Pig" | Arnaud Janvier, François Dufour | Arnaud Janvier, François Dufour | 25 December 2018 |
Two pigs are determined to bring in the new year with a bang.
| 117 | 25 | "Doorbell Symphony" | Arnaud Janvier, François Dufour | Arnaud Janvier, François Dufour | 29 December 2018 |
A playful pig turns into a doorbell DJ, but not everyone appreciates his talents.
| 118 | 26 | "Getaway Graffiti" | Arnaud Janvier, Francois Dufour | Joonas Rissanen, Ulla Junell | 19 February 2019 |
A sneaky graffiti artist proves too smart for his own art when the police catch him in the act.
| 119 | 27 | "Light Riders" | Meruan Salim | Chris Sadler | 5 March 2019 |
Two workers have a smashing time while fixing the street lights.
| 120 | 28 | "Post No Pigs" | Arnaud Janvier, François Dufour | Arnaud Janvier, François Dufour | 9 April 2019 |
A worker pig gets into a sticky situation while bill-posting.
| 121 | 29 | "Snout Invasion" | Meruan Salim | Duncan Rochfort | 25 April 2019 |
The intergalactic explorers return for revenge, and this time it's war.
| 122 | 30 | "Pigs Can Fly" | Meruan Salim | Meruan Salim | 30 May 2019 |
It's the end of the show and a happy pig sings us off in style. Note: This is the series finale. At the end, the words on the firework screen say "The End".

== Production ==
After producing Angry Birds Toons and Angry Birds Stella, Rovio decided to make a show about the pigs. While an early animation test had been done with real claymation, it was decided that it would be too time-consuming for the full series, so the first two seasons were computer-animated to imitate claymation instead.

The design of the theater used in Third Act was inspired by French and Italian theaters from the 1920s and 1930s, with minor elements suggesting it had been built by the pigs. The title cards for each episode were inspired by Broadway posters from the same era.

== Home media ==
Sony Pictures Home Entertainment is the DVD distributor for the series.

- Piggy Tales: The Complete 1st Season (1 December 2015)
- Piggy Tales: Pigs at Work: The Complete 2nd Season (1 March 2016)
- Piggy Tales: Third Act: The Complete 3rd Season (11 April 2017)
- Piggy Tales: The Complete 4th Season (22 December 2017)
