= Stafford College =

Coordinates: 52.8063°N 2.1208°W

Location
- Earl Street; Stafford, West Midlands, ST16 2QR; England

Information
- Type: Further education college
- Motto: Two Campuses, One Destination
- Established: 1978
- Department for Education URN: 130813 Tables
- Ofsted: Reports
- Principal: Craig Hodgson
- Gender: Mixed
- Age: 16+
- Website: https://nscg.ac.uk/stafford-campus

Stafford College is a large provider of further and higher education based in Stafford, England. The college campus is on Earl Street in Stafford Town Centre. Qualifications taught include a wide range of A-levels, with additional choice offered through the Stafford Collegiate, which is a collaboration between Stafford College and other local education providers. The College also offers vocational subjects, often in industry-standard facilities. Music technology students learn in a suite of recording studios; beauty therapists gain skills in the Stafford Beauty Academy, which is a working salon open to the public. Workshops exist for students of Motor Vehicle, Trowel Occupations, Construction Plant, Plumbing and on-campus restaurants provide experience for students training in hospitality subjects.

Since 2016 Stafford College and Newcastle Under-Lyme College have merged into Newcastle and Stafford Colleges Group.

In 2004 the College built a new sports hall providing teaching facilities for students on sports-related subjects and recreational opportunities for other students. The following year it opened the Broad Eye building (named after the Broad Eye Windmill, located just across the road from the college), a dedicated centre with studio facilities for art and design subjects. This facility has since been razed to make room for more up-to-date facilities.

In September 2023, the campus opened its Skills and Innovation Centre. This is a 7,500 square meter, 3 story facility, that is equipped with leading edge equipment and state-of-the-art skills, construction, engineering and motor vehicle facilities, along with a 4-court sports hall, gym and 300-seat auditorium.

Stafford College offers higher education courses in partnership with Staffordshire University. Sports Coaching and Physical Education is an example of this. Subjects offered at HND and Foundation Degree-level are increasing and current information can be obtained from the College prospectus or its website. At present, Foundation Degrees include subjects such as: Fine Art, Illustration, 3D Design, Graphics & Digital Design, Photography, Fashion, Computing, Sustainable Communities, Small Business & Salon Management, Early Childhood Studies, Education (Teaching Assistants), Leadership & Management and Social Science.

== Former students ==
- Steve Edge, actor
- Christopher Sadler, award-winning director
- Niko Omilana, YouTuber and politician
