= Christopher Sadler =

British animator, director and writer (born 1970)

Christopher Sadler (born 1970) is a British animator, director and writer. He is primarily known for his work on Wallace and Gromit, Chicken Run, Angry Birds Toons, Rex the Runt, Cracking Contraptions, Creature Comforts and Shaun the Sheep.

He completed his secondary education at Codsall High School, Staffordshire, leaving in 1989 having passed four A levels. He then joined a one-year art and design foundation course at Stafford College before moving to Bristol and embarking on a Graphic Design degree at University of the West of England.

Although he originally focused on illustration, Sadler later turned his hand to stop motion animation. He graduated in 1993. He began his professional career as a freelance model/set builder before returning to animation. During the 1990s he worked for various film production companies including Bolex Brothers and Elm Road Studios in Bristol, Aaagh Animations in Cardiff and Gnome Productions in Wellington, New Zealand.

He first worked for Aardman Animations in 1994 as a freelance animator and model maker, working on several commercials and the pilot episode for Richard Goleszowski's Rex the Runt series. This led to him being given his first chance to direct when the second series went into production in 2001. In 1999 he was a member of the animation team on Robbie the Reindeer for the BBC, his last independent production before joining Aardman.

He became a full-time Aardman staff member in November 2000 and enjoyed several roles during his time there, including key/character animator on the stop frame feature film projects, "Chicken Run", "Curse of the WereRabbit" and "The Pirates! In an adventure with Scientists!" He joined the Shaun the Sheep team in late 2005, helping to develop the look and animation style of the series and was director of ten episodes.

He was made series director for the second series of forty episodes, which completed production in March 2010. After the filming of "The Pirates! In an adventure with Scientists!" completed in December 2011, he returned to direct five more episodes of "Shaun the Sheep" series 3. He left Aardman Animations in August 2012.

== Awards and nominations ==
- 2010 - International Emmy Awards - Winner of Children and Young People category for 'Shaun The Sheep'
- 2010 - The Writers' Guild of Great Britain - Winner Best Children's Television Drama/Comedy
- 2010 - BAFTA Children's Awards - Winner for Animation - Director: Richard Webber, Series Director: Chris Sadler; Producer: Gareth Owen
- 2010 - British Animation Awards - Winner for Best Children's Series for "Ewe've Been Framed" Director: Richard Webber, Series Director: Chris Sadler; Producer: Gareth Owen
- 2008 - International Emmy Awards - Winner of Children and Young People category for 'Shaun The Sheep' (Director with Richard Goleszowski and JP Vine)
- 2007 - Annecy Awards - Winner of Best TV Production - 'Still Life' from the 'Shaun the Sheep' (Director)
- 2007 - BAFTA Children's Award - Nominated for 'Shaun the Sheep' (Director, along with Julie Lockhart & Richard Goleszowski)
- 2007 - Rushes Soho Short Film Festival - Winner of The Era Animation Award - ‘Shaun the Sheep – Off the Baa’ (Director)
- 2005 - 33rd Annie Awards - Nomination for Best character animation 'Wallace & Gromit: The Curse of the Were-Rabbit' (with Jay Grace)
