= Newcastle-under-Lyme College =

Newcastle-under-Lyme College (NSCG)

Location
- Knutton Lane; Staffordshire, ST6 2GB; United Kingdom
- Coordinates: 53.0152°N 2.2379°W

Information
- Type: Further education college
- Motto: Committed to Excellence
- Established: 1986
- Local authority: Staffordshire
- Department for Education URN: 130812 Tables
- Ofsted: Reports
- Principal: Craig Hodgson
- Gender: Mixed
- Age: 16+
- Capacity: 8150
- Website: https://nscg.ac.uk

Newcastle College is further education college in Newcastle-under-Lyme, Staffordshire, England.

Providing a wide range of academic, vocational and apprenticeship qualifications from entry to degree level, along with the support services to help learners achieve their goals. The College has grown significantly over the past 10 years and is currently home to a population of over 8,000 students studying full-time, part-time, higher education and apprenticeship programmes.

In January 2010, the College, based on Knutton Lane, Newcastle-under-Lyme, opened its new £65 million campus. Included on campus is a Sports Centre, Skills and Technology Centre, University Centre and Lego® Education Innovation Studio. In 2014, a purpose built £5.5 million Performing Arts Centre was built alongside the main campus.

In 2016, Newcastle Under-Lyme College and Stafford College merged to form Newcastle and Stafford Colleges Group, and in 2019 the newly formed group became the first college in England to be rated Outstanding by Ofsted in every performance criteria of the reformed Education Inspection Framework.

Newcastle College offers higher education courses in partnership with Staffordshire University. Subjects offered at HNC/HND and Foundation Degree-level are increasing and current information can be obtained from the College or its website. Currently, higher education courses include subjects such as: Business. Fashion, Computing, Performing Arts, Music, Early Childhood Studies/Education, Engineering, Health & Social Care, Digital Content Creation, Travel and Tourism, Sport and Public Services.

== History ==
The college was formed as a tertiary college in 1986. However, the term "general further education" college better describes its business. In May 2016 the college announced its intention to merge with Stafford College, which is based in the county town and was previously rated inadequate by Ofsted.

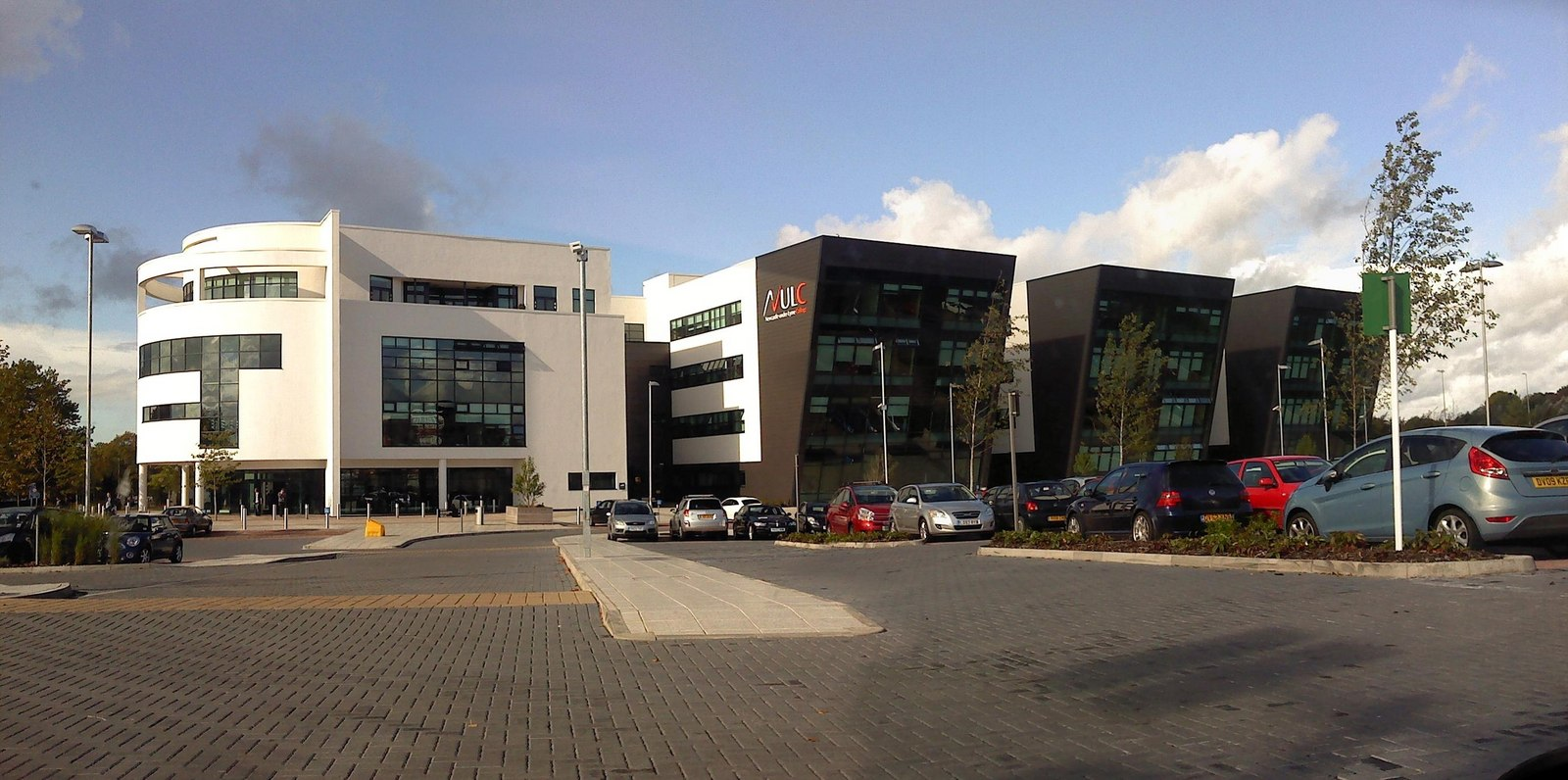
Newcastle-under-Lyme College Campus

Newcastle-under-Lyme is a North Staffordshire town with a population of 123,100, although the conurbation of Stoke-on-Trent and Newcastle-under-Lyme, together with the Staffordshire Moorlands, accounts for a population of more than 500,000 and it is from this wider catchment area that the College draws the majority of its students.

== Notable former students ==
- Pete Bebb, Academy Award winning special effects artist for Inception
- Charlotte Salt, TV actress in Casualty
