= Yowza! Animation =

Canadian animation studio

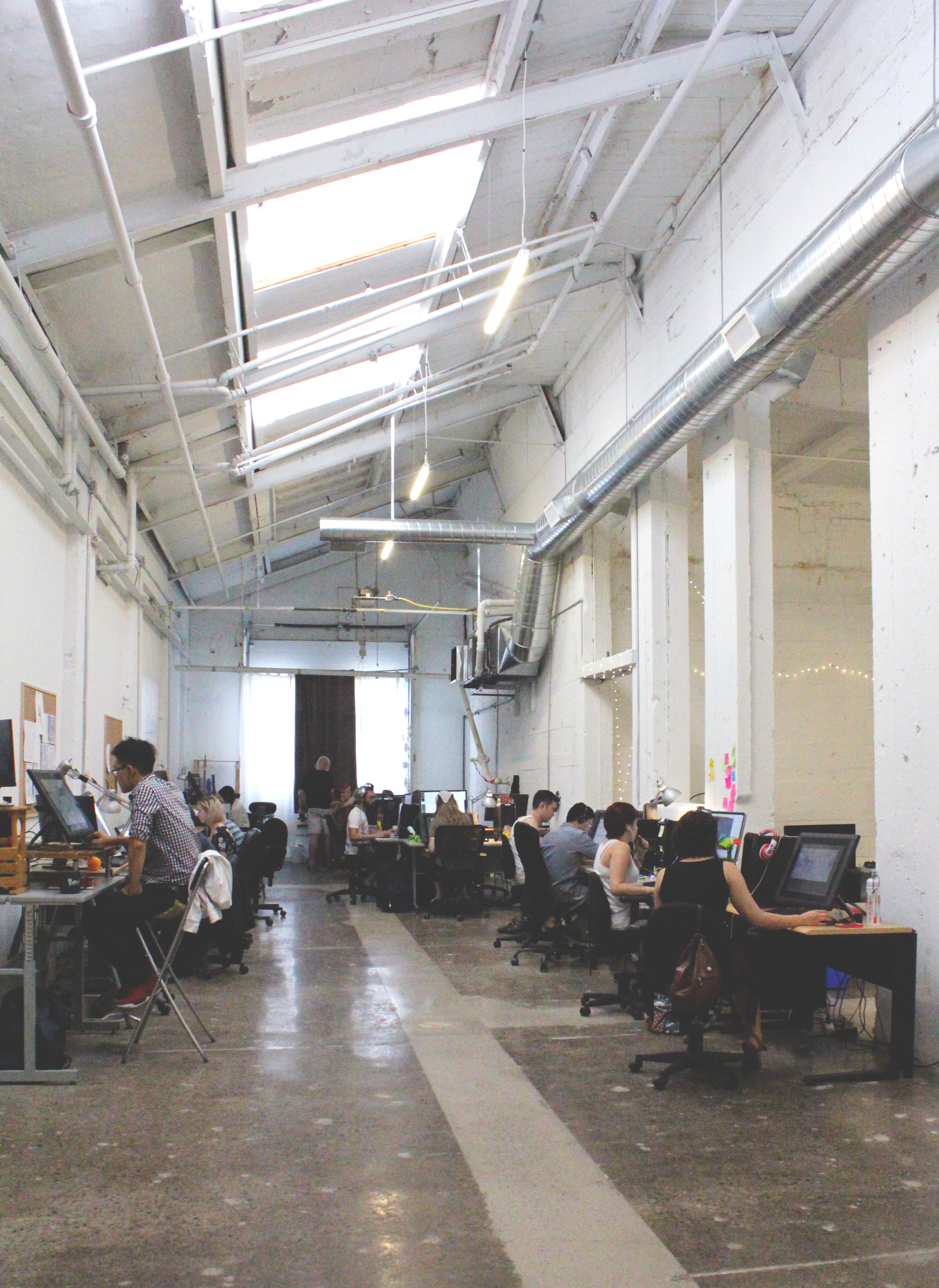
- The Yowza! Animation (studio)
- Company type: Private
- Industry: Animation; Entertainment
- Founded: 1996; 30 years ago Toronto, Ontario, Canada
- Founder: Claude Chiasson
- Headquarters: Toronto, Ontario, Canada
- Products: Traditional animation; Harmony; CGI animation
- Website: yowzaanimation.com

Yowza! Animation (formerly known as Yowza Digital) is a Canadian animation studio based in Toronto and founded by Claude Chiasson in 1996. They specialize in providing additional animation and/or clean-up and ink-and-paint for various shorts and feature films. The studio utilizes animation using Toon Boom.

On July 4, 2016, Heather Walker bought Yowza! Animation from founder Claude Chiasson.

== Work ==
Title	Year(s)	Client	Notes
101 Dalmatians	1996	Walt Disney Pictures	clean-up
Mr. Magoo	1997	Walt Disney Pictures	animated sequences
The Drew Carey Show	1998	Warner Bros. Television	"My Best Friend's Wedding" (Daffy Duck opening)
Quest for Camelot	1998	Warner Bros. Feature Animation	additional production services
1001 Nights: An Animation Symphony	1998	Hyperion Animation	animation and clean-up
Werner - Volles Rooäää!!!	1999	Hahn Film	additional animation
Bartok the Magnificent	1999	Fox Animation Studios	subcontractor
Titan A.E.	2000	Fox Animation Studios	
Osmosis Jones	2001	Warner Bros. Feature Animation	
Scooby-Doo	2002	Warner Bros. Pictures	deleted intro
Eight Crazy Nights	2002	Meatball Animation	
101 Dalmatians II: Patch's London Adventure	2003	Walt Disney Television Animation	
Looney Tunes: Back in Action	2003	Warner Bros. Feature Animation	
The 3 Wise Men	2003	Animagicstudio	
Scooby-Doo 2: Monsters Unleashed	2004	Warner Bros. Pictures	
Fat Albert	2004	20th Century Fox	animation
Kronk's New Groove	2005	DisneyToon Studios	
Curious George	2006	Universal Animation Studios	
Shorty McShorts' Shorts	2006	Walt Disney Television Animation	"Bozzlebag's Zip"
Curious George	2006	Universal Animation Studios	intro animation
Chicago 10	2007	Brett Morgen	Lincoln Park riot sequence; co-produced with Switch VFX
Dinosapien	2007	BBC Worldwide/CCI Entertainment	CGI animation and VFX
How to Hook Up Your Home Theater	2007	Walt Disney Animation Studios	
The Little Mermaid: Ariel's Beginning	2008	DisneyToon Studios	sneak peeks
The Princess and the Frog	2009	Walt Disney Animation Studios	
The Ballad of Nessie	2011	Walt Disney Animation Studios	clean up/in-between animation and ink and paint
Winnie the Pooh	2011	Walt Disney Animation Studios	clean up/in-between animation and ink and paint
Hippothesis	2011		
Mansour	2013–19	ICE Animations	
The Travels of the Young Marco Polo	2013		
Welcome to the Wayne	2014, 2017–19	Nickelodeon Animation Studio	
Kung Fu Panda: Secrets of the Scroll	2015	DreamWorks Animation	
Lexi & Lottie	2016	SLR Productions	storyboards (3 episodes)
Kiri and Lou	2019–present	Cake Entertainment	
Green Eggs and Ham	2019–22	Warner Bros. Animation	
Klaus	2019	The SPA Studios	clean up/in-between animation and ink and paint
Looney Tunes Cartoons	2019–23	Warner Bros. Animation	
Cake	2020	FX Productions	"Dicktown" segments
Tom and Jerry Special Shorts	2021	Warner Bros. Animation	
Animaniacs	2021	Warner Bros. Animation	four episodes of Season 2
Middlemost Post	2021–22	Nickelodeon Animation Studio	
Angry Birds: Summer Madness	2022	Rovio Animation	
Nature Cat	2022–25	Spiffy Pictures	Season 4 and 5
Carl the Collector	2024–present		
Cartoon Cartoons	2026	Cartoon Network Studios	“Harmony in Despair” and “Off the Menu”

Disney Interactive video games

Title	Year(s)	Notes
Maui Mallard in Cold Shadow	1996	clean-up
Disney's Animated Storybook: The Hunchback of Notre Dame	1996	clean-up
Disney's Animated Storybook: Hercules	1997	animation and clean-up
Disney's Animated Storybook: 101 Dalmatians	1997	animation and clean-up
Disney's Animated Storybook: Hercules	1997	animation and clean-up
101 Dalmatians: Escape from DeVil Manor	1997	animation and clean-up
Hercules	1997	additional animation
Nightmare Ned	1997	additional animation
Disney's Math Quest with Aladdin	1998	animation and clean-up
Disney's Hades Challenge	1998	additional animation
Disney's Adventures in Typing with Timon and Pumbaa	1998	clean-up
Disney's Animated Storybook: Mulan	1998	additional assistant animation
Disney's Arcade Frenzy	1999	clean-up
Tarzan	1999	animation and clean-up
Disney's Animated Storybook: Winnie the Pooh & Tigger Too	1999	additional assistant animation
Ariel's Story Studio	1999	additional animation
Disney's Beauty and the Beast Magical Ballroom	2000	additional assistant animation
Disney's Activity Center: Winnie the Pooh	2000	clean-up
Disney's Activity Center: Tigger	2001	clean-up

Commercials

- 101 Dalmatians (1996)
- Instant Keno Lottery
- Nescafé
- Henry & Sally's
- Marinela
- Astro Yogurt
- Friday Night Nicktoons (2002)
- Xenical
- Applebee's
- Tropicana
- Barbie
- Best Buy/AMC Theatres (2005)
- Dunkin' Donuts (2006)
- Honda (2006–2008)
- CareerBuilder (2008)
- American Legacy Foundation (2008)
- Owens Corning
- Estée Lauder Companies (2017, with House Special)
