= Wallace & Gromit's Cracking Contraptions =

- Cover art
- Directed by: Loyd Price; Christopher Sadler
- Written by: Merlin Crossingham; Seamus Malone; Nick Park; Loyd Price; Christopher Sadler; Mike Salter
- Based on: Wallace & Gromit by Nick Park
- Produced by: Harry Linden; Peter Lord
- Starring: Peter Sallis
- Cinematography: Andy MacCormack
- Edited by: John Carnochan
- Music by: Julian Nott
- Production company: Aardman Animations
- Distributed by: Atom Films
- Release date: 12 October 2002
- Running time: Approx. 2 minutes per episode Total: 23:49 minutes in all
- Country: United Kingdom
- Language: English

Wallace & Gromit's Cracking Contraptions is a British series of ten Wallace & Gromit stop motion animations varying in length from 1 to 3 minutes. Each episode features one of Wallace's new inventions and Gromit's sceptical reaction to it. The series was produced and released in 2002 by Aardman Animations. All ten shorts were aired on BBC One after the television premiere of Chicken Run (2000).

The idea for Cracking Contraptions came about when Japanese broadcasters were desperate for new material and asked if there were any shorts they could air on TV.

This was the first Wallace & Gromit production to be in widescreen.

== Episode descriptions ==
=== Shopper 13 ===
Because no dogs are allowed into the shop, Wallace deploys a remote-controlled trolley equipped with a camera and accessories to retrieve cheese from it and carry it home. Though it successfully picks up the largest wheel of Edam in the shop, its weight causes one wheel to fall off. Gromit guides it to grab a loaf of French bread, which it uses as a crutch to limp home. The other wheel comes off at the front door, stopping the trolley and, in the process, dumping the Edam in the garden. Wallace sends Shaun the Sheep to bring it in here, but Shaun begins eating the Edam cheese instead. Wallace began calling Gromit, who is still in the basement, to stop Shaun, but Gromit, not wanting to get involved, ignores Wallace while Shaun happily munches away on the cheese. This short contains numerous references to NASA, especially the Apollo 13 mission.

=== The Autochef ===
To avoid the necessity for cooking, Wallace activates the Autochef, a robot chef equipped with a tea nozzle, frying pan and blender. He has it cook scrambled eggs, but they end up on Gromit's head instead of a plate (Gromit clearly suspects something like this will happen as he has donned a sou'wester to protect himself). Wallace decides that he will have fried eggs, but the Autochef throws them onto Wallace's eyes instead, which blinds him. It then starts to squirt hot tea all around the room saying nonsense. Gromit blocks the nozzle with a banana skin, which makes the Autochef shout more nonsense, getting faster and louder as the pressure increases, saying different phases. Finally, after a brief pause it declares "Knickers!” and explodes, destroying the dining room in the process. A weary Wallace resigns himself to having a continental breakfast the following morning.

=== A Christmas Cardomatic ===
Wallace has built a machine to make Christmas cards, with a camera hooked up to take the pictures for them. He has set up a crudely built snowy landscape in the living room, and Gromit - dressed in a bird costume - is reluctantly posing for the pictures. Wallace is pleased with the results, then hoists the backdrop away and walks off, not noticing the picturesque winter scene outside the window. The birds perched out there wave to Gromit, and one blows a party noisemaker at him when Wallace calls out for him to lick the stamps.

=== The Tellyscope ===
To activate the TV set without leaving his chair, Wallace launches a tennis ball into a hole in the wall. It triggers a mechanism that extends the TV across the room on a telescoping shaft, so that Wallace can reach the on/off and channel buttons. When he accidentally tunes into the wrong programme, he finds that he has no more balls available; Gromit hands him the TV remote control, but Wallace throws it into the hole in the wall instead of using it normally. The remote control jams the mechanism, causing the TV to shoot across the room and pin Wallace to the wall.

=== The Snowmanotron ===
For the annual Grand Snowman Competition, Gromit is building a snowman that depicts Wallace as Rodin's "The Thinker", but he is interrupted by the arrival of Wallace with his new Snowmanotron machine. It builds a crude snowman and crushes the body of Gromit's creation, whose head falls off in his paws. An annoyed Gromit goes back into the house, slamming the door hard enough to dump a load of snow off the roof and onto Wallace so that it covers him completely. Realising that he now has a better-looking snowman than before, Gromit adds a carrot nose and eyes. He wins the competition, and Wallace, while later thawing himself out, says, "Well done, Gromit. But I thought that snowman was abominable!”.

=== The Bully Proof Vest ===
On a wild and stormy night, Wallace nervously ventures into the kitchen to get his cup of tea, not noticing a figure that hides in the shadows. He sits down to eat a cracker, only for it to be snatched out of his hand and reappear in a cupboard. The figure turns out to be Gromit, who advances on him threateningly with a rolling pin, but Wallace activates the Bully Proof Vest strapped to his chest. A spring-loaded boxing glove pops out, knocking Gromit across the living room and through a door, and Wallace declares the invention a success. However, he trips on the rolling pin and falls over, triggering the vest so that it launches him upward with enough force to embed him in the ceiling.

=== The 525 Crackervac ===
To speed up Gromit's chores of sweeping, Wallace activates the 525 Crackervac, a vacuum cleaner with sharp metal teeth that can suck up cracker crumbs at high speed. When it starts trying to snatch a packet of Wallace's crackers, he yanks the box away and throws it to Gromit, who eventually lassoes the machine and rides it like a rodeo bull. Gromit ties a knot in its suction hose, causing the rear end to burst and get both Wallace and the area of the room around him coated in dirt. He then asks Gromit to get the dustpan and brush that Gromit had been using at the start.

=== The Turbo Diner ===
While trying to repair the Autochef, Wallace tries a new contraption, the ceiling-mounted Turbo Diner. After inserting a 10p coin into the electric meter, he and Gromit sit at the table. The device clamps their wrists and ankles to their chairs whilst a powerful vacuum sucks all the debris off the table, after which another mechanism sets it and delivers a piping-hot meal. The energy required to do this severely depletes the meter and as the machine lights the candlestick (with a typically over-the-top flame thrower), the meter runs out leaving the pair clamped to their chairs, unable to move. It also results in a power outage. After the candles burn out leaving the pair in the darkness, Wallace says, "Don't worry, Gromit. I've got a great idea.", an homage to the famous cliffhanger ending of The Italian Job.

=== The Snoozatron ===
Wallace can't sleep after eating too much cheese, so he activates his Snoozatron to remedy the problem. The device wakes up Gromit, who puts on a sheep costume and heads downstairs; meanwhile, robot arms fluff Wallace's mattress and pillow, place a hot water bottle on his chest, and give him a teddy bear as a record of lullaby music starts playing. After Gromit reaches the dining room, a huge spring built into the floor repeatedly bounces him upwards, through a trap door in the ceiling, and into Wallace's bedroom. Wallace literally counts sheep and soon falls asleep, as the mechanism continues to bounce Gromit, who gets bored and starts reading the newspaper.

=== The Soccamatic ===
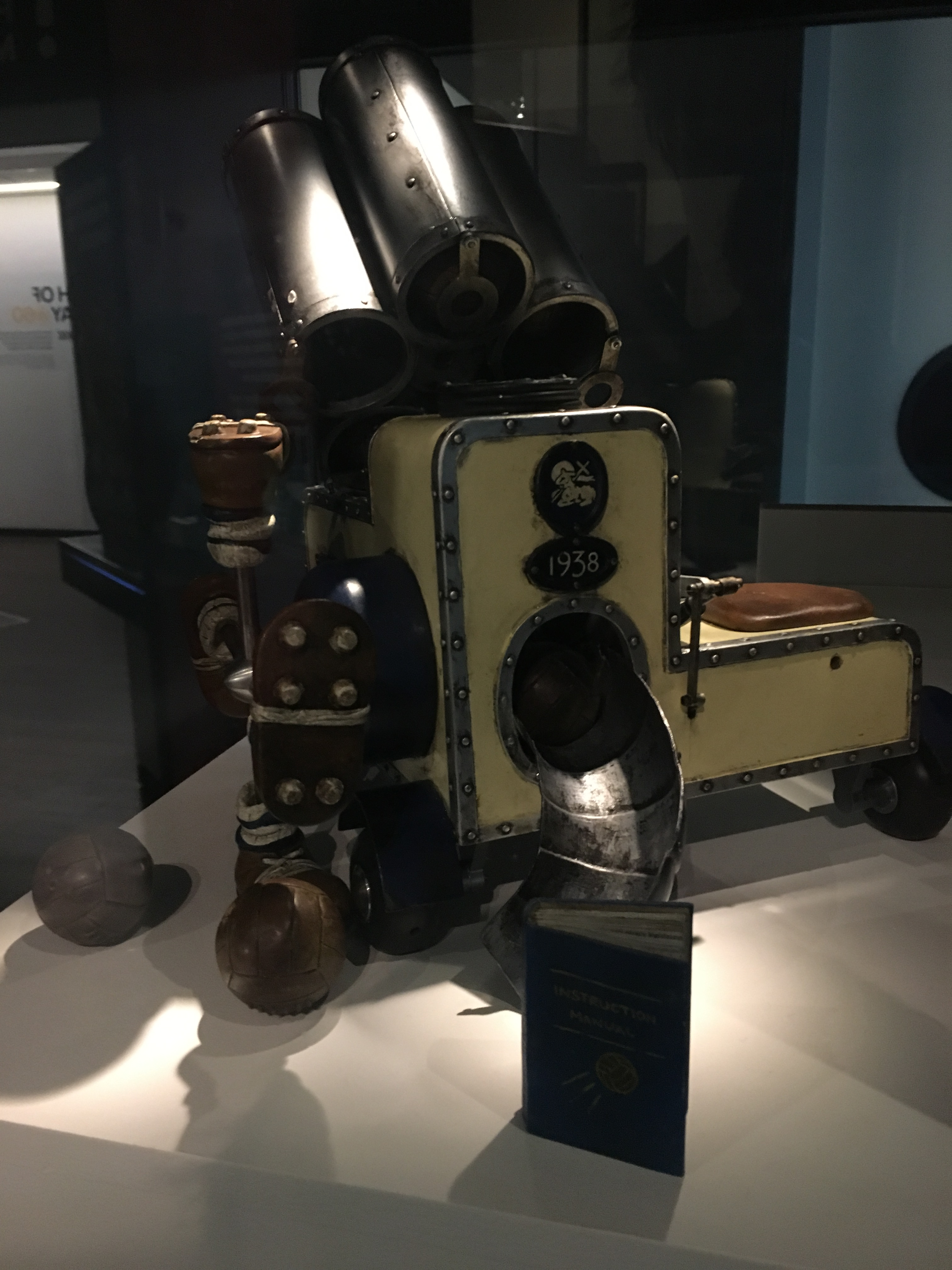
The model of the Soccamatic on display at the National Football Museum

Wallace and Gromit head to the local football field for a bit of practice, with Wallace shooting and Gromit playing goalie. Frustrated at the ease with which Gromit blocks every shot, Wallace activates his Preston North End Soccamatic, a machine that kicks dozens of balls toward the goal. Gromit ducks to avoid the barrage, but when Wallace stops to load in more balls, he dons a vest and gloves that inflate to completely block the goal. Wallace suggests that they switch to tennis; after the ending credits, he serves a ball that bounces off Gromit's vest, and then calls out, "15-love!"

== Releases ==
=== Television broadcast ===
Episodes were broadcast individually on BBC One throughout the Christmas period, 2002. All 10 episodes were later aired as a 25-minute compilation on BBC Three during Christmas 2008, shortly before The Curse of the Were-Rabbit premiered on BBC One.

=== Home media ===
They were subsequently released on a limited edition VHS and Region 2 DVD by Momentum Pictures. The series was also included as a bonus feature on some DVD releases, such as Wallace & Gromit in Three Amazing Adventures; Wallace & Gromit: The Curse of the Were-Rabbit; and can be found on the Walmart exclusive DVD, Gromit's Tail-Waggin' DVD, packaged with The Curse of the Were-Rabbit. Cracking Contraptions was also included as a bonus feature on the Wallace & Gromit: The Complete Collection Blu-ray.

=== Other ===
Episodes first appeared on the internet for free viewing 15 October 2024, and the entire series for paid subscribers 21 October 2024 – July 2025. Starting April 2025 Microsoft sponsored free viewing of individual episodes, one per week. Christmas Cardomatic was viewable free in December 2025.

The series is now available free online on the Aardman YouTube channel, as well as the Wallace & Gromit YouTube channel.

The episodes appeared as comic strips in the 2010 Wallace & Gromit annual.

== Reception ==
The Times described Cracking Contraptions as a "fun, clever, and warmly familiar return to Wallace & Gromit that preserves the charm of the original shorts", though they felt many of the mini‑films were too brief and left viewers wanting more.
