= Angry Birds: Summer Madness =

Animated television series

- Promotional artwork for Season 1
- Genre: Comedy
- Based on: Angry Birds by Rovio Entertainment
- Developed by: Rob Doherty; Scott Sonneborn
- Directed by: Tahir Rana
- Voices of: Ian Hanlin; Gigi Saul Guerrero; Ty Olsson; Deven Mack; Adam Kirschner; Tabitha St. Germain; Peter Kelamis; Ana Sani; David Reynold; Brian Drummond; Lee Tockar
- Theme music composer: Caleb Chan; Brian Chan; Ari Pulkkinen
- Composers: Caleb Chan; Brian Chan
- Countries of origin: Canada; Finland; United Kingdom; United States
- Original language: English
- No. of seasons: 3
- No. of episodes: 36

Production
- Executive producers: Tom van Waveren; Edward Galton; Scott Sonneborn; Heather Walker; Jason Netter; Heather Puttock; Hanna Valkeapää-Nokkala; John Cohen
- Producer: Rob Doherty
- Editors: Paul Hunter; Katie Tomchishen
- Running time: 12 minutes (seasons 1–2); 23 minutes (season 3)
- Production companies: Netflix Animation Studios; Rovio Animation; Cake Entertainment; Kickstart Entertainment; Yowza! Animation

Original release
- Network: Netflix
- Release: January 28 – August 25, 2022

Related
- Angry Birds Toons; Angry Birds Stella; Piggy Tales; Angry Birds Blues; Angry Birds Mystery Island

Angry Birds: Summer Madness is an animated television series developed by Rob Doherty and Scott Sonneborn for Netflix. Based on the Angry Birds franchise by Rovio Entertainment, and loosely based on the characters in the style of The Angry Birds Movie films, the series premiered on January 28, 2022. Season 2 was released on June 24, 2022. Season 3 was released on August 25, 2022, consisting of four specials.

== Premise ==
The series features Red, Stella, Chuck, and Bomb as pre-teens at the summer camp Camp Splinterwood, with their teacher being Mighty Eagle.

== Voice cast ==
=== Main characters ===
- Ian Hanlin as Red and Neiderflyer
- Gigi Saul Guerrero as Stella
- Ty Olsson as Bomb
- Deven Mack as Chuck, Rufus, and the Norm
- Adam Kirschner as Terence and Mighty Eagle
- Tabitha St. Germain as Lynette and Brenda
- Peter Kelamis as Harold
- Ana Sani as Robin and Matilda
- Antti LJ Pääkkönen as Penley

=== Other characters ===
- David Raynold as an unnamed dark blue bird with glasses
- Brian Drummond as two of the Three
- Unknown person as a Duck
- Lee Tockar as Carl
- Ella Tarvonen as Darcy

== Episodes ==
=== Series overview ===
Season	Episodes	Originally released
1	16	January 28, 2022
2	16	June 24, 2022
3	4	August 25, 2022

=== Season 1 ===
No. overall	No. in season	Title	Written by	Original release date
1	1	"Cabin Raid!"	Scott Sonneborn	January 28, 2022
Neiderflyer steals the Hatchlings' care package, so Red and his friends break into his cabin to get it back.
2	2	"Hospital Sweet"	Rob Kutner	January 28, 2022
3	3	"Microphone Mayhem!"	Jono Howard	January 28, 2022
Red learns that Bomb can make his voice sound like Lynette, so he takes advantage of this by causing mayhem with the PA system.
4	4	"Dodgebirds"	Derek Guiley	January 28, 2022
5	5	"It's Raining, It's Boring"	Jeff Sayers	January 28, 2022
Chuck takes his friends out for fun on a rainy day.
6	6	"The Big Bird Bake Off"	Megan Atkinson	January 28, 2022
7	7	"Much Ado About Pudding"	Paul McKeown	January 28, 2022
8	8	"The New Pig"	Andy Rheingold	January 28, 2022
9	9	"Space Oddities"	Greg Grabianski	January 28, 2022
A rocket competition between Stella and Robin goes awry when they accidentally end up in space.
10	10	"Bomb's Away!"	Greg Grabianski	January 28, 2022
Bomb uses trampolines to get out of the crowded areas in the camp, so his friends must try to prevent everyone from getting the same idea.
11	11	"Splashageddon!"	Paul McKeown & Jono Howard	January 28, 2022
Red and his friends try to avoid cleaning their cabins in order to not miss out on the best day of summer.
12	12	"Misadventures in Hatchling-sitting"	Jono Howard	January 28, 2022
Matilda hires the gang to watch the Hatchlings, but it turns out to be not easy to care for them when they start going out of control.
13	13	"The Golden Pineapple"	Jen Bardekoff	January 28, 2022
14	14	"A-Haw-Haw"	Sam Cherington	January 28, 2022
15	15	"Stopped Short"	Vanessa Kanu	January 28, 2022
Red and the Hatchlings try many attempts to ride the new water slide, which has a height limit.
16	16	"Fowl Weather!"	Rob Kutner & Nina Bargiel	January 28, 2022
Lynette is caught by Red in a lie, causing everyone to not listen to her anymore.

=== Season 2 ===
No. overall	No. in season	Title	Written by	Original release date
17	1	"Be Careful What You Fish For"	Todd Garfield	June 24, 2022
The whole camp's happy because of Bomb's crispy and delicious fish sticks. But a lake monster also wants a bite of the tasty treats.
18	2	"A Knight's Tailfeathers"	Sam Cherington	June 24, 2022
Stella ends up saving the day after Red and pals challenge Neiderflyer to a joust match during the camp's medieval-themed weekend.
19	3	"Chuck-in-a-Box"	Story by : John Shepherd; Greg Grabianski	June 24, 2022
Chuck's in big trouble, so Bomb takes time out of his day of relaxation to help Chuck lie low inside his special box.
20	4	"The Un-Chuckening"	Nina Bargiel	June 24, 2022
After Chuck lands an impossible stunt, Stella tries to get him to focus and train to become an Eggs Games champ — just like Toby Hawk.
21	5	"Detective Chuck"	Paul McKeown & Emilio Rossal	June 24, 2022
Chuck's on the case to nab a mysterious nighttime bandit who's plucking out everyone's feathers.
22	6	"Friendship Falls"	Ben Crouse & Jono Howard	June 24, 2022
Red, Stella and crew try to prove that they're still the bestest best friends... even after they fail the camp's friendship course.
23	7	"Bomb's the Bomb"	Cindy Morrow & Sam Cherington	June 24, 2022
Whenever Bomb's around Matilda, his nerves turn his explosions into fireworks for all of the camp's celebrations.
24	8	"Chill Hard"	Rob Kutner	June 24, 2022
Stella's having a hard time trying not to be so competitive, so she gets tips on how to chill out from the easygoing Mighty Eagle.
25	9	"Pillow Fight Club"	Jessica Welsh	June 24, 2022
The only rule of Pillow Fight Club is to never talk about it. But Chuck has a hard time keeping it a secret from Red and Stella.
26	10	"Let's Bounce"	Greg Grabianski	June 24, 2022
Red is a really bad bouncer, so why would Stella's cabin mate Robin ask him to bounce with her? Stella's determined to find out.
27	11	"Fly Like a Mighty Eagle"	Todd Garfield	June 24, 2022
Chuck's so starstruck after seeing the Mighty Eagle fly that he tries to teach himself how to be a flying bird — instead of just a crashing one.
28	12	"The Sabirdteur"	Derek Guiley	June 24, 2022
Red thinks it's too dangerous for Stella to beat terrible Terence at any competition. So Red goes to great lengths to keep her out of trouble.
29	13	"Prematurely Balding Eagle"	Derek Guiley	June 24, 2022
After giving Mighty Eagle a horrible haircut, Red and crew try all the tricks to help Mighty Eagle's flowing locks grow back.
30	14	"Pranks a Lot"	Jono Howard	June 24, 2022
Pig Camp pranksters are causing a mess, so Red and friends think of ways to hit back with their own extreme antics.
31	15	"Crash Course"	Jono Howard	June 24, 2022
The sight of a spinning wheel leaves Red dizzy and conks him out. Can the pals help Red recover in time to beat Neiderflyer at the demolition park?
32	16	"Splinter-Camp Games"	Megan Atkinson	June 24, 2022
Red joins his rivals from the Pig Camp when Lynette doubts he has the smashing skills to earn a spot on Camp Splinterwood's team.

=== Season 3 ===
No. overall	No. in season	Title	Written by	Original release date
33	1	"Lights! Camera! Destruction!"	Story by : Sam Cherington & John Shepherd; Teleplay by : Sam Cherington	August 25, 2022
To save their camp from closing, Red and his friends make a video to promote sign-ups for the camp.
34	2	"Camp Splintarrrwood!"	Todd Garfield	August 25, 2022
35	3	"Hollow-Weenie"	Derek Guiley and Nina Bargiel	August 25, 2022
36	4	"Pigmas"	Jono Howard	August 25, 2022

== Production ==
In October 2018, Rovio announced that a new, long-form Angry Birds television series was in production for a 2020 release. A few days later, British production & distribution company Cake Entertainment (who distributed Rovio's previous TV series Angry Birds Toons), had joined to produce & distribute the series internationally. One year later, during the Annecy Animation Festival, Rovio Entertainment and Cake Entertainment revealed character art designs for the upcoming Angry Birds series, with Toronto-based animation studio Yowza! Animation joining to co-produce and provide animation production for the series.

In early 2020, it was announced that the animated series, now titled Angry Birds: Summer Madness, would premiere in 2021 on Netflix. It was eventually released in January 2022. The series consists of thirty-two 11-minute episodes and four 22-minute specials.

In February 2021, Angry Birds: Summer Madness transitioned to traditional animation with Kickstart Entertainment joining as a co-producer, alongside Yowza! Animation.

== Release ==
Originally slated for a 2021 launch, Angry Birds: Summer Madness premiered on January 28, 2022, globally on Netflix.
