= Circular keyboard =

Musical keyboard in the shape of a circle or semicircle

A circular keyboard is a musical keyboard in the shape of a circle or semicircle. They are a relatively new concept in music, while a curved keyboard is mentioned as an invention of an Australian Cluham already in a Czech newspaper from 1909, to which (according to the 1909 newspaper) "experts attribute great importance for the future."

== Examples ==
- Max Rebo of the Star Wars franchise plays a circular keyboard in the 1983 film Return of the Jedi.
- Bandleader Zorak sat inside a circular keyboard on Space Ghost Coast to Coast, an animated television show that premiered in 1994.
- The PianoArc is a circular wrap-around keyboard piano with 292 keys and a 6 ft (1.8 m) outer diameter. It was envisioned by Brockett Parsons, the keyboardist for Lady Gaga and first used in 2012. It was constructed by a friend for an estimated $120,000.
