= GunZ Dash =

2013 Chinese mobile video game

- Original icon
- Developer: Timi Studio
- Publisher: CHN: Tencent
- Platforms: iOS, Android
- Release: CHN: 16 September 2013
- Genre: Endless runner
- Mode: Single-player

GunZ Dash (simplified Chinese: 天天酷跑; pinyin: Tiāntiān Kùpǎo) is a 2013 Chinese endless running mobile video game released by Tencent. The game became the first mobile game in China to generate over CNY 100 million (US$16.27 million) in monthly revenue.
