= Angry Birds Mystery Island =

- Based on: Angry Birds by Rovio Entertainment
- Voices of: Harvey Guillén; Kate Micucci; Dominic Monaghan; Nasim Pedrad
- Composer: Kevin Manthei
- Countries of origin: Canada; Finland; United States
- Original language: English
- No. of seasons: 1
- No. of episodes: 24

Production
- Executive producers: Eric Rogers; Chris Prynoski; Shannon Prynoski; Antonio Canobbio; Ben Kalina
- Running time: 11 minutes
- Production companies: Rovio Animation; Rovio Entertainment; Amazon MGM Studios; Titmouse, Inc.

Original release
- Network: Amazon Kids+
- Release: May 21 – December 3, 2024

Related
- Angry Birds Toons; Angry Birds Stella; Piggy Tales; Angry Birds Blues; Angry Birds: Summer Madness

Angry Birds Mystery Island is an animated mystery comedy television series based on the Angry Birds video game series by Rovio Entertainment. It revolves around a group of children stranded on a deserted island and their search for a way home. The series was released on Amazon Prime Video under the Amazon Kids+ branding on May 21, 2024.

== Synopsis ==
Angry Birds Mystery Island revolves around four preteens—hatchlings Mia, Rosie, Buddy, and a piglet named Hamylton—who are invited to a free vacation but are instead mistakenly sent to an undiscovered deserted island. They are left to explore the island and try to get back home by solving mysteries as a team.

== Voice cast ==
- Harvey Guillén as Buddy
- Kate Micucci as Mia
- Dominic Monaghan as Hamylton
- Nasim Pedrad as Rosie

=== Guest ===
- Black Thought as Bat-Bat
- Ernie Hudson as Marlon
- Dee Bradley Baker as Jok-al / Wormzinger / Aardvark / Egg / Ice Boar / Incid Ape
- Roger Craig Smith as Tree Frog / Incid Ape / Play-N-Say
- Kari Wahlgren as Laura Palmtree / Bird #1 / Bird #2 / Bird #3 / Pig Cart Vendor / Pig Student #1 / Pig Student #2 / Punk Rock Pig Nancy
- Avril Lavigne as Tuba
- Jinkx Monsoon as Hera
- Morgan Dufour as Chester
- John DiMaggio as Scottish Pig
- Greg Ellis as Pig in Suit / Pig Student #3 / Punk Rock Pig Sid

== Episodes ==
No.	Title	Directed by	Written by	Original release date
1	"Go for Launch!"	Andrew Wilson	Eric Rogers	May 21, 2024
2	"Gim(Mia) Shelter"	Mckenzie "Mac" Kerman	Eric Rogers	May 21, 2024
3	"The Egg-splorers"	Gary Ye	Eric Rogers	May 21, 2024
4	"The Worm Turns"	Andrew Wilson	Eric Rogers	May 21, 2024
5	"Phone-y Business"	Gary Ye	Eric Rogers	May 21, 2024
6	"Truffled Feathers"	Andrew Wilson	Eric Rogers	May 21, 2024
7	"On Island Time"	Perin Mclean & Gary Ye	Amy Schwartz Messina	May 21, 2024
8	"Chums in the Water"	Mckenzie "Mac" Kerman	Eric Rogers	May 21, 2024
9	"The Bat-Bat"	Mckenzie "Mac" Kerman	Dave Rapp	August 20, 2024
10	"Squid Gang"	Andrew Wilson	Josh Haber	August 20, 2024
11	"Twin Beaks"	Mckenzie "Mac" Kerman	Alana Liu Moskowitz	August 20, 2024
12	"A-squawk-alypse Now"	Andrew Wilson	Eric Rogers	August 20, 2024
13	"Swamp Things"	Perin Mclean	Louis Mendiola	August 20, 2024
14	"The Clone Boars"	Andrew Wilson	Shannon McClung	August 20, 2024
15	"Bird & Magic"	Perin Mclean & Gary Ye	Eric Rogers	August 20, 2024
16	"Crazy Little Thing Called Lava"	Mckenzie "Mac" Kerman	Eric Rogers	August 20, 2024
17	"The Hangry Games"	Mckenzie "Mac" Kerman	Meg Favreau	December 3, 2024
18	"Woolly Bully"	Perin Mclean	Josh Haber	December 3, 2024
19	"Plantains of the Apes"	Andrew Wilson	Eric Rogers	December 3, 2024
20	"Hatch Day"	Mckenzie "Mac" Kerman	Amy Schwartz Messina	December 3, 2024
21	"Rocket Plan"	Andrew Wilson	Dave Rapp	December 3, 2024
22	"Don't Go Misplacin' Waterfalls"	Perin Mclean	Alana Liu Moskowitz	December 3, 2024
23	"Homework: Finale"	Mckenzie "Mac" Kerman	Eric Rogers	December 3, 2024
24	"Homework: Finale"	Perin Mclean	Eric Rogers	December 3, 2024

== Production ==
The series was announced on June 6, 2023, as a partnership between Rovio Entertainment and Amazon, with Eric Rogers serving as showrunner and head writer, as well as executive producing alongside Chris Prynoski, Shannon Prynoski, Antonio Canobbio and Ben Kalina of Titmouse, Inc.

== Release ==
The first 8 episodes were released on May 21, 2024, with 24 episodes set to be released in total. The second batch of the series was released on August 20, 2024. The third batch was released on December 3, 2024.
