= Angry Birds Toons =

Finnish animated television series, 2013–2016

- Genre: Comedy; Adventure; Silent comedy; Slapstick
- Created by: Mikael Hed; Lauri Konttori; Mikko Pöllä
- Based on: Angry Birds by Rovio Entertainment
- Developed by: Søren Fleng
- Voices of: Antti Pääkkönen; Antti LJ Pääkkönen; Pasi Ruohonen; Lynne Guaglione; Heljä Heikkinen; Rauno Ahonen; Chris Sadler
- Opening theme: "Angry Birds Toons"
- Composers: Mike Reagan; David Schweitzer; Benny Oschmann; Alexander Röder; Douglas Black Heaton; Salla Hakkola
- Country of origin: Finland
- Original language: English
- No. of seasons: 3
- No. of episodes: 104 (list of episodes)

Production
- Executive producers: Mikael Hed; Nick Dorra; Mikko Pöllä; Steve Pegram
- Producers: Søren Fleng (season 1); Pablo Jordi (seasons 2–3)
- Running time: 2–5 minutes
- Production company: Rovio Animation (Note: Animation outsourced to Toon City; Karrot Animation and Copenhagen Bombay provided animation for select episodes)

Original release
- Network: Toons.TV; MTV3
- Release: 17 March 2013 – 13 May 2016

Related
- Angry Birds Stella; Piggy Tales; Angry Birds Blues; Angry Birds: Summer Madness; Angry Birds Mystery Island

Angry Birds Toons is a Finnish short-form animated television series based on Rovio Entertainment's Angry Birds franchise. The series follows the adventures of the birds as they struggle to guard their eggs against the pigs, who want to steal them for their king to eat, as well as adventures from within each group. Episodes were released weekly from 2013 to 2016.

== Episodes ==
Series	Episodes	Originally released	
Series	Episodes	First released	Last released
1	52	17 March 2013	8 March 2014
2	26	19 October 2014	12 April 2015
3	26	1 October 2015	13 May 2016

== Characters ==
=== Angry Birds ===
- Red is a temperamental desert cardinal and the leader of the flock. He is bossy, strict and poor at stress and anger management, but he is perhaps the most dedicated to protecting the Eggs and preventing the Pigs from stealing them.
- Chuck is a yellow Atlantic canary triangular-shaped bird who can move incredibly fast, to the point of even slowing down time. He is incredibly arrogant, narcissistic, dumb, and even possesses a hero complex at times, though he does have the flock's best interest at heart. He frequently causes problems for everyone around him due to his need to be in the spotlight.
- Bomb is a black bird with a fuse-like feather on top of his head and can cause explosions at will. He is laid-back, well-mannered, and has an active imagination. He often plays an older brother or fatherly figure to the Blues.
- The Blues are a trio of eastern bluebirds who are mischievous and fun-loving, pulling pranks on both the Pigs and the Birds. They are the youngest in the flock. Their names are Jay, Jake, and Jim.
- Matilda is a white chicken with rosy cheeks that serves as the mother figure of the group. A stereotypical hippy; she loves nature and is always seeking peaceful solutions to problems, but quickly loses her temper when things don't go as planned. She enjoys cooking, gardening, music, and theatre. She'll frequently engage with the Pigs in these activities.
- Terence is a large, dark crimson desert cardinal with a permanent grumpy appearance. He prefers to be silent and quiet, only grunts to communicate, rarely makes eye contact, and never blinks. He normally moves around by disappearing and reappearing elsewhere only when other characters are not looking at him. His immense weight and stonewall personality are comically worked into the episodes' plots.
- Bubbles is a small, inflatable, orange spot-breasted oriole that only makes an appearance in the series of Halloween-themed episodes. Like The Blues, he is mischievous and fun-loving, but sweet and energized. He has a one-track mind on acquiring more and more candy. He is also the only bird who doesn't appear with the rest of the flock.

=== Bad Piggies ===
- Corporal Pig is a militaristic pig who wears a helmet with an ace of spades playing card. He reveres King Pig and likes to bully others and order the minion pigs around. According to his Angry Birds profile, he had accidentally glued his tin helmet to his scalp, though a couple of episodes show that it can be removed.
- Foreman Pig is a pig with a bright ochre-orange moustache and a vision-less eye who is in charge as a construction engineer. He occasionally leads the charge for stealing the birds' eggs when Corporal Pig isn't doing so.
- King Pig is a large pig who is the ruler of Piggy Island. He is depicted as being gluttonous, lazy, stupid, immature, and selfish. His ego is also very fragile, often behaving like a spoiled child when things don't go his way. A running gag in the show is that his palace is constantly being reduced to rubble by the various antics of both the birds and pigs.
- Chef Pig is a pig with a chef hat and a French moustache who cooks for the King and frequently helps with egg vandalism. He is incredibly devious and will act against even the other pigs, including the king, if it suits him.
- Minion Pigs are the pigs who dutifully serve the King, although they would prefer to just have dumb fun. As a group, they are a competent and reliable workforce, having constructed an entire city for their kind, in stark contrast to the live-on-the-land lifestyle of the birds.
- Professor Pig is an intelligent pig with square-lensed glasses and grey eyebrows, he owns a science lab in a house he shares with Foreman Pig, in the lab he runs multiple scientific experiments, but most of the time Foreman Pig changes the experiments into schemes for egg-stealing.
- El Porkador is one of the Fat Pigs, he is used by Corporal Pig to intimidate the birds, due to his size and strength; but he is not used very commonly as he lacks agility.

== Production ==
Rovio announced a television series based on the Angry Birds video game series with 52 short episodes. The series was produced by the Finnish animation studio Kombo, which Rovio bought in June 2011. "I am happy to say we are going to roll out a weekly animation series this year of short format content," said Nick Dorra, head of the animation at Rovio. Animation services were predominately provided by Manila-based studio Toon City using Toon Boom Harmony, while the British animation studio Karrot Animation and the Danish studio Copenhagen Bombay provided animation for select episodes utilizing Flash animation.

The series was made available worldwide on Angry Birds apps via Toons.TV, selected video-on-demand services, and select smart TVs.

== Reception ==
Angry Birds Toons received positive reviews from critics and audiences. Emily Ashby of Common Sense Media gave a show four stars out of five, saying "this gem of a series that doesn't overextend itself beyond the limits of the games themselves." In his review of volumes 1 and 2 of season 1 DVD release, Michael Zupan of DVD Talk praised the series' characters, animation, and humour. He also described it as "witty, hilarious and highly reminiscent of the days when we used to watch Looney Tunes and Tom & Jerry."

== Home media ==
Sony Pictures Home Entertainment is the home media distributor for the series. While the first season got a Blu-ray release, later releases starting with season two were only available on DVD.

Format	Release	Season(s)	Episode count	Release date	Episodes
DVD and Blu-ray	Volume 1	1	26	3 December 2013	1 ("Chuck Time") – 26 ("Hamshank Redemption")
DVD and Blu-ray	Volume 2	1	26	15 April 2014	27 ("Green Pig Soup") – 52 ("Bomb's Awake")
DVD	The Complete First Season	1	52	2 December 2014	1 ("Chuck Time") – 52 ("Bomb's Awake")
DVD	Volume 1	2	13	1 December 2015	53 ("Treasure Hunt") – 65 ("Chuckmania")
DVD	Volume 2	2	13	1 March 2016	66 ("Not Without My Helmet") – 78 ("Epic Sax-Off")
DVD	Volume 1	3	13	16 August 2016	79 ("Royal Heist") – 91 ("Mind The Pony")
DVD	Volume 2	3	13	6 December 2016	92 ("Robo-Tilda") – 104 ("Toy Hoggers")

== Specials ==
On 21 October 2011, before the series started, Rovio made a Halloween special as the trailer for the Angry Birds Seasons episode of Ham'o'ween, and as the backstory of how the bird Bubbles joined the flock of birds; later in the same year, Nickelodeon showed Angry Birds: Wreck the Halls, a Christmas special that aired on 17 December 2011, and which was included as a bonus feature on the Season 1, Volume 1 DVD; on 20 January of the next year, Nickelodeon showed Angry Birds: Year of the Dragon, a special celebrating the Chinese Year of the Dragon, and the Angry Birds Seasons episode of the same name; and Angry Birds Space, an animated prequel to the video game of the same name in March 2012.

== Book adaptation ==
On January 1, 2016, Rovio and Kaiken Entertainment Ltd (Now Ferly Ltd) published a series of 4 books written by Les Spink called Angry Birds Toons Tales. The books contained more in-depth written versions of the first twelve episodes of the series, although the visuals shown in the books are the same as the visuals which appear in the animated versions of the episodes.

== Spin-offs ==
=== Piggy Tales ===
On 11 April 2014, Rovio released a series titled Piggy Tales on their multi-platform broadcasting channel, Toons.TV, with the first episode called "Trampoline". The series show the minion pigs' life, with other exclusive characters to appear in various episodes, but no other pigs or birds were featured.

The first two seasons used claymation-style CGI to depict the pigs as they appeared in most Angry Birds games, with the latter two seasons shifting to complete computer-generated imagery and focusing on the pigs as they appeared as in The Angry Birds Movie.

=== Angry Birds Stella ===
Based on the puzzle video game spin-off of the same name, the series is based around Stella, the pink bird, along with her friends Luca, Willow, Poppy, and Dahlia as they work their way against Gale, the former friend of Stella, that currently is the queen of the pigs in Golden Island.

=== Angry Birds Blues ===
Another spin-off series, titled Angry Birds Blues. The series shows The Blues' life, along with the Hatchlings, and is set between the events of The Angry Birds Movie and its sequel. It premiered on 10 March 2017 on Toons.TV.

=== Angry Birds BirLd Cup ===
In the summer of 2018, on the eve of the 2018 FIFA World Cup in Russia, Rovio announced a new series, titled Angry Birds BirLd Cup, which leverages a partnership with the UK soccer/association football team Everton FC, in which Premier League stars hold a special contest between two teams of children, representing Red and Chuck. The teams compete in special challenges to win the titular "Birld Cup", with the pigs keeping score.

=== Angry Birds on the Run ===
In the fall of 2018, Rovio announced a new series, titled Angry Birds on the Run, which leverages a partnership with Blink Industries, to create the first live-action Angry Birds series. The series shows that Red, Chuck, and Bomb fall out of a girl's phone, and they try to find the kid to get home before Rovio replaces them. The show was released on 17 November 2018 on YouTube. In the spring of 2020, Rovio Entertainment announced the second season of the series, with the first episode released on 13 June 2020.
