= Rovio Animation =

Canadian animation studio

Rovio Animation, Ltd.
- Industry: Animation
- Predecessor: Kombo
- Founded: 20 January 2012; 14 years ago
- Founder: Jarno Väkeväinen; Niklas Hed
- Headquarters: Vancouver, Canada; Los Angeles, United States; Helsinki, Finland
- Key people: Mika Ihamuotila
- Revenue: €190 million
- Number of employees: 430
- Parent: Rovio Entertainment (2012–2017); Ferly Corporation (2017–present)

Rovio Animation, Ltd. (also known as Rovio Animation Studios) is an animation studio division of Ferly Corporation (formerly known as Kaiken Entertainment) after it was acquired from its original owner, Rovio Entertainment in March 2017, while still working exclusively on the company's Angry Birds franchise. It is led by former Rovio CEO Mikael Hed.

As of 2023, Rovio's television works are currently distributed by Cake Entertainment.

== History ==
Kombo was an animation studio formed in Finland specializing in advertising. The company was most well known for their Angry Birds trailers and shorts with a more cartoonish art style, which were made from 2009 to 2013. In 2011, they were acquired by Rovio Entertainment, folding up the independent art making studio, where they would only work on Angry Birds trailers. The company only worked on trailers for the first game, Angry Birds Seasons, and Angry Birds Rio. Kombo would be folded into Rovio Animation in 2013.

== Filmography ==
=== Television series ===
Title	Genre	Seasons	Runtime	Premiere date	Last episode	Status	Network
Angry Birds Toons	Adventure, comedy, slapstick	3 seasons, 104 episodes	2 min. 45 sec.	17 March 2013	13 May 2016	Ended	Toons.TV
Piggy Tales	Comedy	4 seasons, 121 episodes	1 min.	11 April 2014	30 May 2019	Ended	Toons.TV
Angry Birds Stella	Adventure, comedy drama	2 seasons, 26 episodes	6 min.	1 November 2014	11 March 2016	Ended	Toons.TV
Angry Birds Blues	Adventure, comedy	1 season, 30 episodes	2 min.	10 March 2017	14 December 2017	Ended	Toons.TV
Angry Birds BirLd Cup	Adventure, comedy	1 season, 10 episodes	3 min.	9 June 2018	2018	Ended	YouTube
Angry Birds Zero Gravity	Adventure, comedy	1 season, 3 episodes	45 sec.	3 October 2018	2018	Ended	YouTube
Angry Birds on the Run	Comedy	2 seasons, 39 episodes	2 min.	17 November 2018	14 November 2020	Ended	YouTube
Angry Birds MakerSpace	Comedy	2 seasons, 35 episodes	1 min.	1 June 2019	2025	Ended	YouTube
Angry Birds Slingshot Stories	Comedy	4 seasons, 75 episodes (1st season only, continued by Maya Digital Studios)	1 min.	18 January 2020	2025	Ended	YouTube
Angry Birds Bubble Trouble	Comedy	2 seasons, 44 episodes	1 min.	31 August 2020	August 2023	Ended	YouTube
Angry Birds: Summer Madness	Adventure, comedy, slapstick	3 seasons, 36 episodes	13-24 min.	28 January 2022	25 August 2022	Ended	Netflix
Angry Birds Mystery Island	Adventure, comedy, mystery	1 season, 24 episodes	23-30 min.	21 May 2024	3 December 2024	Ended	Amazon Prime Video; Amazon Kids+

=== Feature films ===
Title	Release date	Director(s)	Writer(s)	Producer(s)	Distributor(s)	Co-production with	Budget	Box office	Rotten Tomatoes	Metacritic
The Angry Birds Movie	20 May 2016	Clay Kaytis; Fergal Reilly	Story by: Mikael Hed; Mikko Pöllä; John Cohen; Screenplay by: Jon Vitti	John Cohen; Catherine Winder	Sony Pictures Releasing	Columbia Pictures	$73 million	$352.3 million	44%	43
The Angry Birds Movie 2	14 August 2019	Thurop Van Orman; John Rice (co-director)	Peter Ackerman; Eyal Podell; Jonathan E. Stewart	John Cohen	Sony Pictures Releasing	Columbia Pictures; Sony Pictures Animation	$65 million	$154.7 million	72%	60
The Angry Birds Movie 3	23 December 2026	John Rice	Thurop Van Orman	John Cohen; Dan Chuba; Carla Connor; Namit Malhotra	Paramount Pictures	Prime Focus Studios; Sega Sammy Group				

=== Short films ===
Title	Director	Producers	Release date
The Early Hatchling Gets the Worm	John Rice	John Cohen; Catherine Winder	20 May 2016
Live Stream			14 August 2019
