= Toons.TV =

Multiplatform entertainment channel

- Website type: Animation
- Available in: English
- Dissolved: August 1, 2017; 9 years ago
- Owner: Rovio Entertainment
- Website: toons.tv (archived)
- Launched: February 17, 2013; 13 years ago
- Current status: Defunct

Toons.TV is a discontinued multiplatform entertainment website and app owned and operated by the Rovio Animation division of Rovio Entertainment (known best for creating the Angry Birds franchise). It was available via website, most Rovio app-on-demand providers, smart TVs and other connected devices, as well as its own app. As of December 2014, its content was viewed more than four billion times.

As of August 1, 2017, the Toons.TV brand has been discontinued; its site and the app are shut down, and any links to it have been redirected to the Angry Birds' official YouTube channel.
