= List of Angry Birds video games =

Angry Birds
- Logo since 2015
- Genres: Puzzle, kart racing, role-playing, shoot 'em up, tile-matching, pinball, redemption
- Developers: Rovio Entertainment, Resolution Games, XR Games, Play Mechanix, Hologate, LAI Games
- Publishers: Rovio Entertainment, Chillingo, Focus Multimedia, Activision
- Platforms: Android; arcade; Barnes & Noble Nook; BlackBerry 10; Google Chrome; iOS; macOS; Maemo; Nintendo 3DS; PC; PlayStation 3; PlayStation 4; PlayStation 5; PlayStation Portable; PlayStation Vita; Roku; Samsung Smart TV; Wii; Wii U; Windows; Windows Phone; Xbox 360; Xbox One
- First release: Angry Birds; 11 December 2009
- Latest release: Angry Birds Bounce; 3 July 2025

Angry Birds is a video game franchise created by Jaako Iisalo for Rovio Entertainment. It centers around a flock of birds rivalling against a civilisation of green pigs, who often attempt to steal and eat the birds' nest of eggs. Games in the franchise are most commonly developed and published by Rovio for mobile devices, though several have been developed by other studios or released for other systems such as consoles or arcade machines. The franchise primarily consists of puzzle games, but also includes games in other genres such as racing, role-playing, and tile-matching. A majority of the games depict the titular birds as the playable protagonists, while the pigs usually serve as antagonists.

The franchise debuted in 2009 with the puzzle game Angry Birds, which initially released for iOS that December and quickly became a success. On 11 December 2024, Eric Warner from Game Rant reported that the series' installments had been downloaded over three billion times by 2015.

== Mobile games ==
=== Physics-based puzzle games ===
Game	Details
Angry Birds Original release date: WW: 11 December 2009	Release years by system: 2009 – iOS, Maemo 2010 – Android; 2011 – Google Chrome, Google+, PC, Roku, Barnes & Noble Nook, Windows Phone 7; 2012 – PlayStation 3, PlayStation Portable, Samsung Smart TV
Angry Birds Original release date: WW: 11 December 2009	Notes: Chillingo published the game.
Angry Birds Seasons Original release date: WW: 21 October 2010	Release years by system: 2010 – Android, iOS 2011 – Roku; 2012 – PC
Angry Birds Seasons Original release date: WW: 21 October 2010	Notes: Seasons was originally released as Angry Birds Halloween, but was renamed when a Christmas update was released in December 2010.
Angry Birds Rio Original release date: WW: 22 March 2011	Release years by system: 2011 – Android, iOS, PC, Roku 2013 – Windows Phone 7, Windows Phone 8
Angry Birds Rio Original release date: WW: 22 March 2011	Notes: The game is a tie-in with the 2011 film Rio.; In 2014, an update introduced levels from Rio 2.
Angry Birds Friends Original release dates: WW: 13 February 2012; WW: May 2, 2013	Release years by system: 2012 – Facebook 2013 – iOS, Android
Angry Birds Friends Original release dates: WW: 13 February 2012; WW: May 2, 2013	Notes: The game was initially made for Facebook as Angry Birds Facebook, but later released standalone.
Angry Birds Space Original release date: WW: 22 March 2012	Release years by system: 2012 – Android, iOS, PC
Bad Piggies Original release date: WW: 27 September 2012	Release years by system: 2012 – Android, iOS, OS X, PC, Windows Phone
Bad Piggies Original release date: WW: 27 September 2012	Notes: The game is the first spin-off in the Angry Birds series.; Focus Multimedia published the PC port.
Angry Birds Star Wars Original release dates: WW: 8 November 2012; US: 29 October 2013; WW: 1 November 2013	Release years by system: 2012 – Android, iOS, Windows Phone 2013 – Nintendo 3DS, PlayStation 3, PlayStation 4, PlayStation Vita, Wii, Wii U, Xbox 360, Xbox One
Angry Birds Star Wars Original release dates: WW: 8 November 2012; US: 29 October 2013; WW: 1 November 2013	Notes: The game is the first crossover with the Star Wars franchise.
Angry Birds Star Wars II Original release date: WW: 19 September 2013	Release years by system: 2013 – Android, iOS, Windows Phone
Angry Birds Star Wars II Original release date: WW: 19 September 2013	Notes: The game is the second crossover with Star Wars, based on the prequel trilogy.; It is the first Angry Birds game to support Telepods, a toys-to-life merchandise line from Hasbro.
Angry Birds Stella Original release date: WW: 4 September 2014	Release years by system: 2014 – Android, iOS
Angry Birds 2 Original release date: WW: 30 July 2015	Release years by system: 2015 – Android, iOS
Angry Birds 2 Original release date: WW: 30 July 2015	Notes: The game is a direct sequel to Angry Birds.
Angry Birds AR: Isle of Pigs Original release date: WW: 30 April 2019	Release years by system: 2019 – iOS
Angry Birds AR: Isle of Pigs Original release date: WW: 30 April 2019	Notes: The game uses augmented reality.
Angry Birds Reloaded Original release date: WW: 15 July 2021	Release years by system: 2021 – iOS, macOS
Angry Birds Reloaded Original release date: WW: 15 July 2021	Notes: The game was made for Apple Arcade, Apple's subscription service.
Angry Birds Journey Original release date: WW: 20 January 2022	Release years by system: 2022 – Android, iOS
Angry Birds Journey Original release date: WW: 20 January 2022	Notes: The game was soft launched under the name Angry Birds Casual in 2020.
Rovio Classics: Angry Birds Original release date: WW: 31 March 2022	Release years by system: 2022 – Android, iOS
Rovio Classics: Angry Birds Original release date: WW: 31 March 2022	Notes: The game is a remake of Angry Birds.; It was developed by Rovio using Unity.; Rovio Classics was delisted from Google Play on 23 February 2023. On the iOS App Store, it was renamed to Red's First Flight.

=== Other genres ===
Game	Details
Angry Birds Go! Original release date: WW: 11 December 2013	Release years by system: 2013 – Android, BlackBerry 10, iOS, Windows Phone
Angry Birds Go! Original release date: WW: 11 December 2013	Notes: The game is a kart racing game that uses 3D graphics.; It is the second game in the series to support Telepods.
Angry Birds Epic Original release dates: AU/NA: 17 March 2014; WW: 12 June 2014	Release years by system: 2014 – Android, iOS, Windows Phone 8
Angry Birds Epic Original release dates: AU/NA: 17 March 2014; WW: 12 June 2014	Notes: Epic is a turn-based role-playing video game.
Angry Birds Transformers Original release dates: WW: 15 October 2014; WW: 30 October 2014	Release years by system: 2014 – Android, iOS
Angry Birds Transformers Original release dates: WW: 15 October 2014; WW: 30 October 2014	Notes: Crossover with the Transformers franchise.
Angry Birds Pop! Original release date: WW: March 2015	Release years by system: 2015 – Android, iOS
Angry Birds Pop! Original release date: WW: March 2015	Notes: The game is a spin-off of Angry Birds Stella.; It was initially titled Angry Birds Stella Pop.; The gameplay copies Puzzle Bobble, though graphically, it more closely resembles King.com's Bubble Witch 2 Saga.
Angry Birds Fight! Original release dates: THA: 30 January 2015; APAC: May 2015; WW: 11 June 2015	Release years by system: 2015 – Android, iOS
Angry Birds Fight! Original release dates: THA: 30 January 2015; APAC: May 2015; WW: 11 June 2015	Notes: The game is a puzzle-RPG similar to Puzzle & Dragons.
Angry Birds Action! Original release date: WW: 28 April 2016	Release years by system: 2016 – Android, iOS
Angry Birds Action! Original release date: WW: 28 April 2016	Notes: Played from a top-down perspective, Action! has been described as being similar to pinball.; It was developed to tie in with the release of The Angry Birds Movie.
Angry Birds Blast Original release date: WW: 22 December 2016	Release years by system: 2016 – iOS
Angry Birds Blast Original release date: WW: 22 December 2016	Notes: It is a tile-matching game similar to Candy Crush Saga.
Angry Birds Evolution Original release date: WW: 15 June 2017	Release years by system: 2017 – Android, iOS
Angry Birds Evolution Original release date: WW: 15 June 2017	Notes: It is a turn-based role-playing game.
Angry Birds Match Original release dates: AU/CAN/DEN/FIN/ISL/NOR/SWE: 11 November 2016; WW: 31 August 2017	Release years by system: 2016 – Android, iOS
Angry Birds Match Original release dates: AU/CAN/DEN/FIN/ISL/NOR/SWE: 11 November 2016; WW: 31 August 2017	Notes: The game is a tile-matching game based on characters from The Angry Birds Movie.
Angry Birds Dream Blast Original release dates: UK/FIN: October 2018; WW: 24 January 2019	Release years by system: 2018 – Android, iOS
Angry Birds Dream Blast Original release dates: UK/FIN: October 2018; WW: 24 January 2019	Notes: It is tile-matching game that revolves around tapping and matching bubbles, featuring younger versions of the Angry Birds characters as special moves.
Angry Birds Bounce Original release date(s): WW: 3 July 2025	Release years by system: 2025 – iOS
Angry Birds Bounce Original release date(s): WW: 3 July 2025	Notes: The game is the second Angry Birds game made for Apple Arcade.; It is a block-breaker game similar to Arkanoid.

== Console games ==
Game	Details
Angry Birds Trilogy Original release dates: NA: 25 September 2012; EU: 28 September 2012	Release years by system: 2012 – Nintendo 3DS, PlayStation 3, Xbox 360 2013 – Wii, Wii U
Angry Birds: First Person Slingshot Original release date(s): WW: Q3 2018	Release years by system: 2018 – Magic Leap One
Angry Birds: First Person Slingshot Original release date(s): WW: Q3 2018	Notes: Resolution Games developed the game.
Angry Birds VR: Isle of Pigs Original release date: NA/EU: 26 March 2019	Release years by system: 2019 – PlayStation 4, Windows 2023 – PlayStation 5
Angry Birds VR: Isle of Pigs Original release date: NA/EU: 26 March 2019	Notes: The game is a puzzle game that uses virtual reality.; Resolution Games co-developed the game.; Originally released for PlayStation VR on PlayStation 4, it was ported to PlayStation VR2 on PlayStation 5 on October 10, 2023.
The Angry Birds Movie 2 VR: Under Pressure Original release date: WW: 6 August 2019	Release years by system: 2019 – PlayStation 4
The Angry Birds Movie 2 VR: Under Pressure Original release date: WW: 6 August 2019	Notes: XR Games developed the game.; It is a tie-in with The Angry Birds Movie 2.

== Arcade games ==
Game	Details
The Angry Birds Movie 2: Prank Attack VR Original release date: 2019	Release years by system: 2019 – Arcade
The Angry Birds Movie 2: Prank Attack VR Original release date: 2019	Notes: It is a virtual reality game for up to four players.; It is based on The Angry Birds Movie 2.
Angry Birds Coin Crash Original release date: 2021	Release years by system: 2021 – Arcade
Angry Birds Coin Crash Original release date: 2021	Notes: It is a tower-building coin pusher available in two and three player versions.
Angry Birds Boom! Original release date: 2024	Release years by system: 2024 – Arcade

== Soft-launched games ==
Game	Details
Angry Birds Dream Island Original release date: CAN/FIN/UK: 1 February 2018	Release years by system: 2018 – Android
Angry Birds Dream Island Original release date: CAN/FIN/UK: 1 February 2018	Notes: The game is a sequel to Angry Birds Blast.; It was titled Angry Birds Island during its first soft launch.; Rovio Entertainment pulled the game from release in Western regions in June 2019. The game is still available in China.
Bad Piggies 2 Original release date: EU: 9 May 2023	Release years by system: 2023 – Android, iOS
Bad Piggies 2 Original release date: EU: 9 May 2023	Notes: The game is a sequel to Bad Piggies.
Angry Birds Rush Original release date: USA: 15 September 2025	Release years by system: 2025 – iOS
Angry Birds Rush Original release date: USA: 15 September 2025	Notes: The game uses mechanics similar to auto-running games.
Angry Birds Match World Original release date: FIN: 24 October 2025	Release years by system: 2025 – iOS
Angry Birds Match World Original release date: FIN: 24 October 2025	Notes: It is a tile-matching game.

== Cancelled games ==
Game	Details
Angry Birds Ace Fighter Cancellation date: September 2016	Proposed system release: 2016 – Android
Angry Birds Ace Fighter Cancellation date: September 2016	Notes: The game was initially titled Angry Birds Sky Fighters.; It was a bullet hell game.
Angry Birds Football Cancellation date: 15 December 2016	Proposed system release: 2016 – Android, iOS
Angry Birds Football Cancellation date: 15 December 2016	Notes: The game was initially titled Angry Birds Goal!.; It was developed to promote the UEFA Euro 2016.
Angry Birds Tennis Cancellation date: 29 October 2020	Proposed system release: 2020 – iOS
Angry Birds Tennis Cancellation date: 29 October 2020	Notes: The game was soft launched in the United States and Mexico on 12 February 2020.; It was a sports video game based on tennis.
