= Angry Birds Blast =

2016 puzzle video game

Angry Birds Blast!
- Developer: MYBO
- Publisher: Rovio Entertainment
- Series: Angry Birds
- Platform: iOS
- Release: December 22, 2016
- Genre: Puzzle

Angry Birds Blast (stylized as Angry Birds Blast!) is a free-to-play tile-matching puzzle game developed by MYBO and published by Rovio Entertainment in 2016 as an installment in the Angry Birds franchise.

== Gameplay ==
Similar to other tile-matching games, balloons are cleared from the gameplay field in groups of at least two, adjoining in the same color. The game is divided into levels with specific goals, such as popping specific bird-shaped balloons, pigs, clearing bubbles from the field, or clearing the path for a hot air balloon to reach the top of the field. Similarly to the main franchise, the board may also contain wood and glass panels as obstacles. Power-ups can be earned for clearing larger groups of balloons, such as a column- or row-clearing rocket (5), a bomb (7), or a laser which removes all balloons of a single colour (9 or more).

Boosters, including attacks and additional moves, can be purchased using silver coins earned whilst playing, or with gold coins, which are purchased via microtransactions.

== Reception ==
Reception

Aggregate score
Aggregator	Score
Metacritic	66/100

Macworld felt that Angry Birds Blast was a "decent game" that "thankfully offers a better attempt at adapting the mobile brand for a color-matching puzzle approach" than other spin-off entries in the Angry Birds franchise, but that the game itself was "uninspiring" due to its similar format to other freemium mobile puzzle games, such as Candy Crush Saga among others. Phone Arena felt that the game was enjoyable and noted that the game was tricky even when in-app purchases were used, but that it was merely a "generic balloon popping game" with Angry Birds theming.

== Successors ==
Blast! later spawned a sequel, Angry Birds Blast Island, that was developed by MYBO and soft-launched in select countries in early 2018, before being shut down in June 2019. A spin-off, Angry Birds Dream Blast, was released in November 2018, featuring younger versions of Red, Chuck and Bomb, as they would appear in the world of The Angry Birds Movie. Dream features gameplay different from its predecessors by utilizing ball physics.
