= Battle Bay =

2017 video game

- Icon
- Developer: Rovio Entertainment
- Publisher: Rovio Entertainment
- Platforms: iOS, Android
- Release: May 4, 2017
- Genres: Real-time strategy, Action, Shooter
- Mode: Multiplayer

Battle Bay is a multiplayer real-time strategy shooter video game developed and published by Rovio Entertainment. It soft launched in select countries on March 10, 2016 and globally released on May 4, 2017.

== Gameplay ==
Battle Bay features matches of 2 teams with 5 players each attempting to destroy the other team or meet an alternative win condition. Before battles, players can individualize their ships almost completely by choosing one of 9 ship bodies and filling the ship's "slots" with weapons or other items of their choice. Each ship body has a unique pattern of slots, meaning it can hold more or less of a certain item type. Players can upgrade their weapons and ships using the game's currencies. Players can also fleet up together, putting them into the same team, and form into guilds.

== Reception ==
Metacritic gave the game 88/100. Pocket Gamer gave the game 4.5/5 Stars, noting it is an "incredibly well constructed game". Gamezebo also gave the game 4.5/5 stars, noting they especially liked the waves as a feature.

Reception

Aggregate score
Aggregator	Score
Metacritic	88/100
