= Totomi =

Totomi may refer to:

- Tōtōmi Province, a pre-Meiji province of Japan on the territory of present-day Shizuoka Prefecture
- Totomi, a game by Finnish studio Rovio Entertainment
