= Car jack =

Car jack or carjack may refer to:

- Jack (device), a mechanical lifting device used to apply great forces or lift heavy loads
- Carjacking, a robbery in which a motor vehicle is taken over

== See also ==
- Car-Jacked (novel), a 2015 novel by Ali Sparkes
- Car Jack Streets, a 2008 video game
