= Angry Birds Evolution =

2017 video game

- Developer: Chimera Entertainment
- Publisher: Rovio Entertainment
- Series: Angry Birds
- Engine: Unity
- Platforms: Android, iOS
- Release: June 15, 2017
- Genres: Puzzle, role-playing

Angry Birds Evolution (listed as Angry Birds Evolution 2020 and later Angry Birds Evolution 2022), is a role-playing video game that was released worldwide by Rovio Entertainment on June 15, 2017. The game plays similarly to Angry Birds Epic, also developed by Chimera Entertainment, with the exception that a player is slinging birds toward the enemies to defeat them instead of using weapons.

The game has received the Editor's Choice award on the Google Play Store. According to mobile research firm Sensor Tower, it has grossed more than $30 million worldwide, as of July 2018.

== Gameplay ==
Angry Birds Evolution is a turn-based role-playing game like Angry Birds Epic, but its battles incorporate the pinball-like elements of Angry Birds Action!, in the sense that the player launches birds at a handful of pigs in a rectangular battlefield, bouncing off of its boundaries, obstacles and enemies strategically to cause as much damage as possible and achieve victory. Each pig will attack after a certain number of turns pass, while birds will be able to use a special move, determined by their plumage color, once their fury builds up after a series of turns. Defeating all pigs would result in victory while allowing the pigs to drain the birds' shared health bar will result in a defeat, unless the player decides to pay gems to replenish some health and keep going.

Winning a battle will grant the player rewards, such as coins, evolution material and eggs. In most regions of the game world, eggs won from these battles will only produce a bird of a particular plumage, depending on what zone the battle was fought in (i.e. battles won in the Yellow Desert would produce eggs for yellow birds). Eggs can also be hatched at the Bird Town to obtain new characters, with a chance to collect characters from The Angry Birds Movie. Birds can only be leveled-up outside of battles, where a bird that wants to level up would be fused with another bird that is then discarded, and once their level cap is reached, the player must spend evolution material to "evolve" them, raise their level cap and generally increase their power rating.

The game has a single-player campaign mode where players set out on a quest to stop the pigs from imperiling the Angry Birds' eggs as usual, as well as thwart the schemes of Bacon Corp and its leader Don Bacon and involves traveling across multiple zones of the game world, each with different terrain. Most areas will empower birds of a certain plumage, allowing them to inflict twice as much damage, and every time a battle is won, it cannot be played again. After every few battles, however, the player will be unable to advance further until two missions are completed by sending out scouts to collect items or reveal battles that can be fought. Up to three scouts can be deployed at once (unless the clan scout is activated), but players must wait one hour before each one can be used again, or skip the wait by paying gems or feeding berries to the exhausted scouts.

It is also possible to participate in player-versus-player matches, which take place in the Oink-tagon, or wherever scouts reveal such a battle. Two players take turns using their bird squads to knock pigs towards their opponent's half of the arena so that they will attack their squad, but can also defeat the pigs to automatically damage the opponent or otherwise gain a small advantage against their opponent. The player who drains their opponent's health bar wins. Players are ranked by how well they play in arena matches in a week-long season, and are rewarded proportionally based on their performance. Since an update in spring 2018, each season may have new rules that grant bigger ranking jumps to players who win with a certain combination of birds, as well as buffs or nerfs to the pigs and/or birds in the arena.

Players can also join clans for perks in battle. Perks are unlocked depending on the clan's level. The clan perks are clan buffs: have clan health and clan smartbomb, clan egg: get an extra egg after winning battle (excluding PvP and PvE), clan trophy boost: get more trophies after winning PvP (excluding PvE after update 1.17), clan coin boost: get extra coins after winning battle, and clan scout: get an extra scout and decrease time for scouts to become available again. Clans can be leveled up by donating coins or activating/increasing time for perks. There are four clan member types Member: no special rights, Elder: ban members, invite new members, co-leader: same as leader but cannot promote or demote leaders, and leader: edit clan details, promote and demote members, ban members, manage invitations, invite new members. There are four clans types for joining that anyone can join: open to anyone, invite only: must be invited to join, request only: must request and have request accepted to join, and closed: cannot join.

Throughout the game's operation, special events become available to all players for a limited amount of time, with new ones added after each subsequent update. Major events provide opportunities to unlock either Matilda and her anger management students, members of a bird rock band, or a handful of newly introduced, powerful birds. In such events, players must gather special event currency throughout the game map, battles and in Bird Town as well to earn more and more prizes, while being encouraged to hatch as many premium eggs as possible to increase their chances of earning a certain event bird, which would reset once he/she is hatched. Other shorter events, such as the Pirate Brawl, has players racing to win as much event currency as possible across a couple of days to earn helpful rewards.

== Reception ==
Julie Muncy of Wired criticized the game's gameplay, writing "you slingshot your birds in classic Angry Birds fashion, sending them careening around tiny combat arenas [...] None of this really works." She additionally criticized its sound design and pop culture references, referring to it as a "cash-in." Pavan Shamdasani of the South China Morning Post was similarly critical of the game, noting its "unoriginal elements" in both gameplay and visual design. Emily Sowden of Pocket Gamer was more positive in her review, writing that "Angry Birds Evolution is a decent game at first before the usual free to play problems comes knocking."
