= Chimera Entertainment =

German video game developer

Chimera Entertainment GmbH
- Company type: GmbH
- Industry: Video games
- Founded: 2006
- Founder: Christian Kluckner; Hendrik Lesser; Alexander Kehr
- Headquarters: Munich, Germany
- Key people: Christian Kluckner, Managing & Development Director; Hendrik Lesser, Managing Director; Alexander Kehr, Creative Director; Christian Dreher, Art Director; Bernhard Falk, Head of Project Management
- Number of employees: 70 (2023)
- Website: www.chimera-entertainment.de

Chimera Entertainment is a German video game developer based in Munich. The company is part of the developer family of Remote Control Productions. As of April 2021, the company employs 70 people.

== History ==
Chimera Entertainment was founded by the Mediadesign University of Applied Science (short MDH) graduates Alexander Kehr and Christian Kluckner together with Hendrik Lesser and his production house remote control productions (short RCP) in Munich, Germany in 2006.

Kehr and Kluckner were among first game design graduates of the Munich-based design academy MDH. Kehr, having developed board and card games since he was six years old, and Kluckner already having four years of experience as a programmer, started working together while still attending the university and created the base for a team of young graduates eager to work within the games industry. The team of remote control productions provided the framework while the company's Managing Director Lesser took over a part of the management of Chimera Entertainment.

In May 2007, Chimera Entertainment received the LARA Start Up Award from the Bavarian Secretary of Commerce. The first project of Chimera Entertainment was Windchaser (PC), a real time tactical role-playing game set in Ensai, an original fantasy world created by Kehr himself.

June 2009 saw the release of Train your Brain with Dr. Kawashima, created in cooperation with BBG Entertainment. This brain training application for PC and Mac is based on the studies of Japanese Neuroscientist Ryuta Kawashima. In cooperation with Bigpoint Games Chimera Entertainment released Warstory - Europe in Flames, a Microsoft Silverlight Browsergame featuring real time battles set in World War II.

In the following years Chimera released several other games on various platforms with Angry Birds Epic (iOS, Android, Windows Phone) being the latest game made by Chimera Entertainment in cooperation with Rovio.

In 2020, the Bavarian FFF Awards Committee announced that it would fund a game by Chimera Entertainment with the working title "Realms at War" with EUR 500,000. During the "Geeked Week" 2022, Netflix announced the mobile game titled "Shadow and Bones: Destinies", which is in development by Chimera Entertainment and is planned to be released in 2023 for Netflix subscribers.

== Releases (chronological) ==
Chimera's debut title called Windchaser (PC) was published in May 2008, followed by several commissioned projects including Train Your Brain With Dr. Kawashima (PC, Mac), memory HD, Demolition Dash and Happy Hills (all iOS). In 2010, Chimera Entertainment launched its first MMO browsergame Warstory – Europe in Flames in cooperation with Bigpoint. In 2012 Chimera Entertainment released in collaboration with different publishing partners the MMO browser games Skylancer: Battle for Horizon and Mission: Genesis and Word Wonders, Sara’s Cooking Class and Towers & Dungeons on mobile platforms. The latest game developed by Chimera in cooperation with Rovio is Angry Birds Epic (iOS, Android, Windows Phone).

Year	Game	Platform(s)	Genre
2008	Wind Chaser	Windows	Strategy RPG
2009	Farm Fever	iOS	Puzzler
2009	Train your Brain with Dr.Kawashima	Windows, Mac	Puzzler
2009	Wiesn Fever	iOS	Puzzler
2010	Memory (HD)	iOS	Puzzler
2010	Warstory - Europe in Flames	Browser	Strategy MMO
2011	Demolition Dash	iOS	Runner
2011	Happy Hills	iOS, Android	Physics Puzzler
2012	Towers & Dungeons	iOS	Towerbuilder
2012	Sara's Cooking Class	iOS	Cooking App
2012	Word Wonders	iOS, Windows	Word Puzzle
2012	Skylancer	Browser	Strategy MMO
2012	Mission: Genesis	Browser	Strategy MMO
2013	Hoppetee!	iOS	Runner
2013	Happy Hills 2	iOS	Physics Puzzler
2014	John Woo's Bloodstroke	iOS, Android	Action
2014	Angry Birds Epic	iOS, Windows Phone, Android	RPG
2017	Angry Birds Evolution	iOS, Android	RPG
2023	Shadow and Bone: Enter the Fold	iOS, Android	RPG
2024	Songs of Silence	Windows, Playstation 5, XBox Series X/S	Strategy

== Awards ==
- LARA Startup Award 2007 from the Bavarian Ministry of Economics
- German Game Developer Awards 2008, Winner Sponsorship Prize
- German Game Developer Awards 2011, Winner Best Mobile Game of the Year (Game: Demolition Dash)
- German Computergames Award 2013, Winner Best Mobile Game (Game: Word Wonders)
- German Computergames Award 2017, Winner Best Mobile Game (Game: Angry Birds Evolution)
