= Tag Games =

Scottish video game developer

Tag Games Ltd
- Type: Subsidiary
- Industry: Video games
- Founded: 2006; 20 years ago
- Headquarters: Dundee, Scotland, UK
- Number of employees: 60
- Parent: Scopely
- Website: www.tag-games.com

Tag Games Ltd was a video game developer and publisher based in Dundee, Scotland. Established in 2006, the company developed games for mobile, tablet and wearable platforms and was an early European developer of titles for both the iPhone and iPad.

Tag Games was a certified member of the United Kingdom game industry trade association The Independent Games Developers Association (TIGA).

== History ==
Paul Farley, Jamie Bryan and Robert Henning founded Tag Games in 2006. Paul Farley and Jamie Bryan had previously been part of development teams at DMA Design and Vis Entertainment where they worked on titles such as Grand Theft Auto, Space Station Silicon Valley and State of Emergency.

The studio's output consists of a mix of original IP development and commissioned work. Tag's clients include Rovio, Activision, EA, Ubisoft, Namco Bandai, Channel 4, Big Fish Games and Wooga.

In June 2011, the studio released its first free-to-play mobile game, Funpark Friends. The game was later nominated for the International Mobile Gaming Awards, the British Academy of Film and Television Arts, and The Herald Scotland mobile games awards, winning the Herald Scotland best Scottish Mobile Game 2011.

In June 2023, Scopely acquired Tag Games. Following the acquisition, Tag Games continued operating from Dundee with approximately 60 employees and became part of Scopely's development organization.

== Games ==
In chronological order (not including Live Ops products):

Title	Release year	Platform	Publisher
Dead Water	--	Mobile	
Rock'n'Roll	--	Mobile, iOS	
Granny In Paradise	--	Mobile	
Football Pro	--	Mobile	
Love Guru	--	Mobile	
All Stars Darts	--	iOS	
Car Jack Streets	2008	Mobile, iOS, DS, PSP, Vita TV	
Smash it Up	--	iOS	
Animal ABC	--	iOS	
ALEX	--	iOS	
Christmas Rock'n'Roll	--	iOS	
GUTS	--	iOS	
Red Ball Challenge	--	iOS	Endemol
B-Boy Beats	--	iOS	Mobile Pie
Team Monster	--	Mobile, iOS	
Astro Ranch	2009	iOS	
TumbleBugs	2010	Mobile, iOS	
True Grit	2010	Mobile, Android	Paramount
Doctor Who: The Mazes of Time	2011	iOS, Android	BBC
Come Dine With Me App	2011	iOS, Android	Channel4
Father Jack Me Up	2011	iOS, Android	Channel4
Peepshow App	2011	iOS, Android	Channel4
cBeebies App	2011	iOS, Android	BBC
Funpark Friends	2011	iOS, Android	
Hotel GB	2012	iOS, Android	Channel4
Hotel Vegas	2013	iOS, Android	
Might & Magic: Clash of Heroes	2013	iOS, Android	Ubisoft
Capital One Penalty Kick	2014	iOS, Android	Capital One
Talking Poppet	2014	iOS, Android, Kindle	Mind Candy
Moshi Monsters Village	2014	iOS, Android, Kindle	Mind Candy
Cat Tap Fever	2014	iOS	505 Games
The Game Of Life	2014		Marmalade Game Studio
Downton Abbey: Mysteries of the Manor	2015	iOS, Android, Kindle	Activision
Toby	2015	WatchOS	Wooga
Angry Birds Action!	2016	iOS, Android	Rovio Entertainment
Ballarina	2016	iOS, Android	Nickelodeon
Prison Architect Mobile	2017	iOS, Android	Paradox Interactive
Monster High: Beauty Shop	2017	iOS, Android	Tabtale / Mattel
Hotel Transylvania: Run Jump Build	2018	iOS, Android	Tabtale / Sony Pictures
Raith Rovers App	2018	iOS, Android	Self Published
Pocket Mortys	2019	iOS, Android	Adult Swim Games
