= Retry =

Retry may refer to:

- Retrial, in which a person is retried in court for various reasons
- Retry, another term for a single play-turn in a video game
- Retry (video game), a former 2014 video game developed by Rovio
- Part of the DOS error message, Abort, Retry, Fail?

== See also ==
- Try (disambiguation)
