= Casey's Contraptions =

2011 video game

- App icon
- Developers: Snappy Touch, Mystery Coconut
- Publishers: Snappy Touch, Mystery Coconut
- Designers: Noel Llopis; Miguel Angel Friginal
- Programmer: Noel Llopis
- Artist: Miguel Angel Friginal
- Platform: iOS
- Release: May 19, 2011
- Genre: Puzzle
- Mode: Single-player

Casey's Contraptions is a 2011 puzzle video game developed and published by the American studios Snappy Touch and Mystery Coconut. It was released on May 19, 2011, for iOS devices.

Rovio Entertainment bought the game IP rights in May 2012, and rebranded it as Amazing Alex.

== Developement and release ==
Casey's Contraptions was developed by Noel Llopis of Snappy Touch, and Miguel Ángel Friginal of Mystery Coconut. It was released for iOS devices on May 19, 2011. In June 2011, the game was updated with an online level sharing service.

== Reception ==
Reception

Aggregate score
Aggregator	Score
Metacritic	89/100

Review scores
Publication	Score
The A.V. Club	A−
Eurogamer	8/10
Gamezebo	90/100
IGN	8/10
Pocket Gamer	4.5/5
TouchArcade	5/5
148Apps	4.5/5
Multiplayer.it	8.8/10
Slide to Play	Must Have
Wired	9/10

On Metacritic, Casey's Contraptions has a "generally favorable" rating based on 11 reviews.
