= Angry Birds Island =

2018 video game

Angry Birds Blast Island
- Developer: MYBO Games
- Publisher: Rovio Entertainment
- Series: Angry Birds
- Platforms: iOS, Android
- Release: February 1, 2018 – June 26, 2019 (1 year, 4 months, 3 weeks and 4 days)
- Genre: Puzzle

Angry Birds Island, also known as Angry Birds Blast Island, is a tile-matching video game that was soft launched in select countries and regions on February 1, 2018, and was slated for wide release in 2019 but was cancelled on June 26, 2019 to focus on the Chinese release. The game was a direct sequel to the original Angry Birds Blast! released in December 2016. The game was developed by MYBO Games and was published by Rovio Entertainment.

== Gameplay ==
Angry Birds Island is a match-three game with gameplay similar to the original Angry Birds Blast released in December 2016. There are varying puzzle levels that the player has to play through in order to continue fixing up existing objects on or adding new objects to a large 3-D HUB-like game world in which the player unlocks more and more of the areas that were previously restricted or closed off. The way the player does this is by playing through levels in order to obtain stars to complete various tasks. To obtain stars, the player must complete the level and achieve a high enough score to earn them whether it be 1, 2, or 3 stars depending on the objective(s), the level, the amount of taps, or moves, the player has left, and the player's score.

== Release ==
The game has since been in soft launch in select regions and territories, such as some Asian countries, since early February 2018. The game was discontinued on June 26, 2019, to focus on the Chinese release.
