= Word Monsters =

2014 video game

- App icon
- Developer: Raketspel
- Publisher: Rovio Stars
- Designer: Raketspel
- Engine: Unity
- Platforms: iOS, Android
- Release: iOS: 27 March 2014; Android: 7 May 2014
- Genre: Puzzle

Word Monsters is a word puzzle game developed by Raketspel and was published by Rovio Stars. However, as of the middle of 2014, the game is published by Raketspel and is no longer published by Rovio Stars. It was released on iOS on March 27th, 2014, and on Android on May 7th, 2014.

== Gameplay ==
The game features creating a custom monster and finding all the words on the screen under a specific time limit. The player may play challenges against their in-game friends or against players worldwide.

== Reception ==
The game has received average reviews with a Metacritic score of 69/100 based on 6 reviews. Pocket Gamer UK gave the game a 70/100, saying "If you're happy to play by its rules, Word Monsters is a polished puzzler packed with content that'll keep you busy for a week or two." AppSpy gave the lowest review, a 60/100, saying "Word Monsters is a nice idea for a puzzle game that is tripped up by interface issues and vocab constraints."
