= Jolly Jam =

2015 puzzle video game

- Developer: Magic Tavern
- Publisher: Rovio Stars
- Platforms: iOS, Android, Facebook
- Release: February 18, 2015
- Genre: Puzzle
- Mode: Single-player

Jolly Jam was a mobile tile-matching puzzle video game, developed by Magic Tavern and published by Rovio Stars. It was released on February 18, 2015, for Android and iOS devices worldwide. The game features different gameplay mechanics, drawing a box around similar objects, compared to most other tile-matching games.

In May 2015, the game was released as a Facebook game. In November 2015, the game was removed from Google Play and Rovio's website.

In September 2015, Rovio discontinued development of Jolly Jam and it was removed from app stores.

== Gameplay ==
The player has to draw a rectangle in order to match similarly colored jellies at the corners of the box, and any similarly colored jellies within the rectangle are cleared. Some levels limit the boxes drawn with move limits, oddly shaped levels and minions that eat the jellies. The boss battles requires the player to clear certain colored jellies in order to defeat the boss.

The storyline is Prince Jam needs players to help him to save Princess Honey and the Jelly Kingdom. To save the Princess, the player must defeat the evil bosses and his minions.

The game uses diamonds as a currency. Users may buy them with real money in bundles from 20 to 600 and they are awarded sparingly during play. Diamonds give additional lives and power-ups to make levels easier.

== Reception ==
Pocket Gamer says it is a solid casual game, and if the player is that sort of gamer then there is a lot to like. 148Apps describes it as simple concept with a level of strategy. GameZebo offers that the game offers innovative ideas and requires strategy, but notes that the first levels are too easy. PC Magazine remarked that game had increasing difficulty despite its starting simplicity. Cubed3 described it as a low effort freemium model game too similar to other games and lacking innovation.
