= Angry Birds Go! =

2013 video game

- Original splash screen
- Developer: Exient
- Publisher: Rovio Entertainment
- Director: Jon Gibson
- Designer: Nic Cusworth
- Composer: Pepe Deluxé
- Series: Angry Birds
- Platforms: Android; Blackberry 10; iOS; Windows Phone 8
- Release: 11 December 2013
- Genre: Racing
- Modes: Single player, multiplayer

Angry Birds Go! is a 2013 kart racing game developed by Exient and published by Rovio Entertainment. A spinoff in the Angry Birds series, players control characters from the series in go-karts and compete in several types of challenges and competitions. Controls are limited to steering only as all races are downhill, and karts can be upgraded using virtual currency collected during races. Toys-to-life elements are also featured as the game is compatible with the Telepods toy line by Hasbro.

Go! was spawned from demand for an Angry Birds kart racer and Rovio wanting to take the franchise in a new direction. It was announced through social media in June 2013 and spawned speculation over which genre it would be. Angry Birds Go! was released for mobile devices on 11 December 2013. It was downloaded 130 million times despite mixed reviews from the specialist mobile and video gaming press, who considered the experience diminished by its upgrade system and microtransactions despite well-received controls, graphics, and gameplay. A reworked cloud version titled Angry Birds Go! Turbo Edition was released in August 2019.

== Gameplay ==
In Angry Birds Go!, players race as and against Angry Birds characters.

Angry Birds Go! is a kart racing game utilising 3D graphics. As a bird of their choice, the player competes in downhill races and challenges, which begin by launching their go-kart from a slingshot. Go! includes multiple game modes: "Race" is a competition against multiple other characters, "Time Trial" is a single-player mode where the player must reach the finish line before time runs out, "Versus" is a race against one other character, and "Fruit Splat" requires the player to collect a set number of fruit before the finish.

Each bird has a singular power-up that can be activated a finite number of times. More birds are unlocked by defeating them in boss races in each level. The speed of the kart cannot be controlled, while steering can be done via motion controls or arrows on the touchscreen. Karts take damage upon impacts and can be upgraded, the latter of which alters its appearance. Coins—which are gained either in races or with crystals, which in turn require real money to purchase—must be spent to upgrade karts. Races and challenges can only be entered if the player's kart has a sufficient power level, which can be increased by upgrading. Characters become tired after being used five times; their energy can be restored by either waiting or spending crystals collected during races.

Additionally, Go! is compatible with Telepods, toys-to-life figures by Hasbro, which allow the player to scan the corresponding kart and character into the game. A Jenga mode can be unlocked either via a code included with a pirate ship-themed Angry Birds Jenga board game or through an in-app purchase. In Jenga mode, the player launches their kart down a ramp and into blocks and pigs.

== Development and release ==
Angry Birds Go! was developed by Exient, who was approached by Angry Birds owner Rovio Entertainment to take the franchise in a new direction. They decided on making it a kart racing game because of supply and demand. Exient had never developed a kart racer prior to Go!, thus "an immense amount of research" went into the appeal of the genre. The developers believed it was important that the go-karts were "held together with chewing gum" and did not have engines, which was in reference to the pigs' structures from the Angry Birds puzzle games as well as the vehicle construction from the spinoff game Bad Piggies (2012). The Europop soundtrack composed by Pepe Deluxé "added to the sense of fun" according to Exient director Graeme Monk.

Rovio announced Angry Birds Go! in June 2013 when a teaser image was uploaded to their Angry Birds Facebook page, featuring the title and the tagline "something new is coming". No gameplay details were included, leading to speculation over whether it would be a kart racing game or an endless runner.

Angry Birds Go! was released for Android, BlackBerry 10, iOS, and Windows Phone 8 on 11 December 2013, as a free-to-play title. Multiple patch updates followed and introduced new content: version 1.4.0 released in July 2014 and introduced online multiplayer, with local multiplayer following in April 2015. The 1.8.4 update, released in July 2015, added late Formula One driver Ayrton Senna as a playable character portrayed by the yellow bird Chuck. In November 2014, Angry Birds Go! was reported to have reached 100 million downloads. In April 2015, Oskar Burman—general manager of Rovio Stockholm—tweeted that Angry Birds Go! had received 130 million downloads, surpassing the total sales of Nintendo's Mario Kart series at the time.

In 2019, a reworking titled Angry Birds Go! Turbo Edition was released for the mobile cloud gaming service Hatch. Turbo Edition includes four-player multiplayer—the original version's multiplayer was strictly 3-versus-3—as well as a leaderboard where the highest-scoring player receives prizes. Additionally, all microtransactions are excluded.

== Reception ==
Reception

Aggregate score
Aggregator	Score
Metacritic	60/100

Review scores
Publication	Score
The A.V. Club	5.5/10
CNET Gamecenter	7.7/10
IGN	5/10
MacLife	1.5/5
PCMag	3.5/5
Pocket Gamer	2.5/5
The Guardian	4/5
VentureBeat	70/100
Digital Spy	1/5

Angry Birds Go! garnered a "mixed or average" critical response according to Metacritic, a review aggregator website. The core game was praised for its touch and tilt control options, graphics, incorporation of Angry Birds characters, and gameplay. However, reviewers, even positive ones, generally considered the experience repetitive, irritating, costly, and exploitative due to the microtransactions characteristic of other freemium titles. Adding to the perceived tedium was the slow regenerating of energy units; only some alleviation was given via unlocking other player characters. Kallie Plagge from IGN and Luke Larson from The A.V. Club suspected Go! was primarily designed around purchasing microtransactions. The sponsored power-ups particularly annoyed MacLife's Andrew Hayward and PC Magazine's Max Eddy.
