= David Maisel =

American film producer

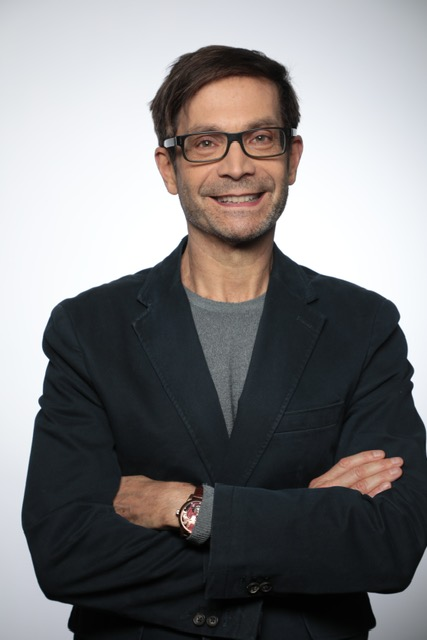
- David Maisel (2019)
- Born: Saratoga Springs, New York
- Education: Duke University; Harvard Business School
- Occupations: Entertainment executive, film and Broadway producer
- Years active: 1994-present
- Known for: Marvel Studios (founding chairman)
- Notable work: Marvel Studios; Iron Man (producer); The Angry Birds Movie (producer); Fosse (producer)
- Awards: Tony Award for Best Musical
- Website: mythosstudios.com

David Maisel is an American film and Broadway producer, entertainment businessman and the architect of the self-financed and self-producing Marvel Studios. He is the executive producer of Iron Man, The Incredible Hulk, Iron Man 2, Thor, Captain America: The First Avenger, and The Angry Birds Movie. At the helm of Livent, Maisel won the Tony Award for Best Musical for the Broadway production Fosse.

== Early life ==
David Maisel was raised in Saratoga Springs, New York. He graduated from Duke University and then earned an MBA from Harvard University. His first job was with Boston Consulting Group where he advised entertainment companies.

== Career ==
Maisel joined Creative Artists Agency in 1994 as a corporate advisory agent working with Michael Ovitz, the agency's founder and CEO. Maisel assisted in Matsushita’s sale of entertainment conglomerate MCA/Universal to Seagram in 1995. When Ovitz joined Walt Disney Company as president in 1995, the company also added Maisel as its Director of Corporate Development and Strategic Planning. When Ovitz left Disney he invited Maisel to plan his next venture. Ovitz acquired a minority stake in the largest publicly traded live-theater company, Livent, and named Maisel President. While at Livent, Maisel produced the Broadway show, Fosse, which won a Tony Award for Best Musical in 1999. Maisel restructured the company and then engineered the sale of Livent to SFX in 1999 for $100 to $110 million.

From 1999 to 2001, Maisel was Managing Director of chello, Europe’s largest broadband-service provider. In 2001, Maisel joined Endeavor Talent Agency to lead its corporate strategy and business development efforts.

=== Marvel Studios ===
In 2003, Maisel pitched Marvel Studios’ CEO and Chairman, Avi Arad and then pitched CEO, Isaac Perlmutter, on his idea of Marvel financing and producing its own movies in a connected cinematic universe. Perlmutter hired Maisel as Marvel Studios’ President. To execute his plan, Maisel engineered a slate-structure financing to total $525 million.

In 2005, Maisel was promoted to Vice Chairman of Marvel Studios and, in 2006, Maisel was also elevated to the Office of the CEO of Marvel Entertainment. Maisel was promoted to Marvel Studios’ Chairman in 2007 and oversaw the launch of the first Iron Man franchise film in 2008. In 2009, Maisel arranged the sale of Marvel to Disney for $4 billion. In 2015, Marvel and Disney recognized and thanked Maisel as the Founding Chairman of Marvel Studios in the credits of Avengers: Age of Ultron.

=== Post-Marvel ===
In July 2011, Maisel was hired by Rovio Entertainment to lead its efforts to make an Angry Birds movie as Special Advisor and Executive Producer of The Angry Birds Movie. The film hit #1 for its opening weekend in May 2016 and grossed $350 million in worldwide box office receipts.

In 2018, The New York Times reported that Maisel partnered with Scooter Braun to launch Mythos Studios, which acquired half of Aspen Comics. In June 2018, Mythos announced an additional animated film about mythological god, Cupid, with Justin Bieber as executive producer and as voice talent. Cupid is one film in a cinematic universe, termed Mythos Studios' "MythoVerse". In 2023, Maisel began development of the Ekos universe inspired by the art and creations from Michael Turner and Geoff Johns.

== Filmography ==
Year	Film	Credit
2008	Iron Man	Executive Producer
2008	The Incredible Hulk	Executive Producer
2010	Iron Man 2	Executive Producer
2011	Thor	Executive Producer
2011	Captain America: The First Avenger	Executive Producer
2016	The Angry Birds Movie	Executive Producer
2019	The Angry Birds Movie 2	Executive Producer
