= Retry (video game) =

2014 video game

- Developer: Rovio LVL11
- Publisher: Rovio Entertainment
- Engine: Unity
- Platforms: iOS, Android
- Release: Canada, Finland and Poland; May 6, 2014; Worldwide; October 22, 2014
- Genre: Action
- Mode: Single-player

Retry was a 2014 free-to-play retro-styled side-scrolling video game published by Rovio Entertainment. As the first game to be developed by Rovio LVL11, it was soft launched in Canada, Finland and Poland in May 2014. The game had its worldwide iOS and Android release on October 22, 2014. In 2017, the game was removed from all platforms after three years. Inspired by Flappy Bird, Retry had similar controls.

== Gameplay ==
The goal of the game was to send an airplane from one hangar to another hangar in different places. There were many obstacles between the two points, including air and moving landscapes.

The game had in-app purchases, and users could pay to make the game ad-free.

The goal of the game was to bring the airplane from one hangar into another hangar without crashing into obstacles (even the ground). In order to move the plane, the players simply had to tap the screen. The plane would then move forwards and upwards. Releasing the finger from the screen made the plane move down. (Similar gameplay has appeared before in old Finnish games, such as Triplane Turmoil (1996) by Dodekaedron Software and even more similarly in Super Sukkula (1994) by Lasse Makkonen.)

In every level, there was at least one "retry point", that when landed upon changes the plane's spawn point into that of the retry point for one coin. The game, unlike Flappy Bird, could also let players loop the plane, and even fly backwards. There were also new gameplay elements such as liquid physics, moving obstacles, stars, and currency (for unlocking levels early and acquiring retry points), which could be earned via achievements or playing levels and purchased for real money.

In certain levels, there were elements that could increase the difficulty. The wind could slow down the plane, water could drown the plane (but not crash), and moving terrain. There were also locked blocks in some levels that locks a certain level path, that could only be opened by unlocking the next level pack.

Like all Rovio games, Retry had a 3-star format. The first star was earned by finishing the level, the second star was earned by not crashing a certain number of times, and the third star by not flying more than a certain distance. Stars, not only shows the mastery of each level but are also used to unlock additional level packs.

== Reception ==
Reception

Aggregate score
Aggregator	Score
Metacritic	87/100

Patrick O'Rourke of canada.com described the game as taking "one of the few things that was great about Flappy Bird", namely the satisfaction of repeatedly retrying the same simple task, and building a full game around the idea. He saw its visuals as paying homage to the Nintendo Entertainment System without "completely ripping them off" as Flappy Bird had done, and summarised the game as a "decent pick-up-and-play iOS title".
