= Angry Birds Journey =

2022 video game

- Key artwork
- Developer: Rovio Entertainment
- Designer: Sandro Kvlividze
- Series: Angry Birds
- Platforms: Android, iOS
- Release: January 20, 2022
- Genres: Casual, puzzle
- Mode: Single-player

Angry Birds Journey is a 2022 puzzle video game developed and published by Rovio Entertainment. It is the 19th instalment in the Angry Birds franchise, sharing similar qualities to its predecessors. It follows a flock of birds as they search for the Egg Wonders—powerful egg-shaped artefacts—aiming to activate them before a group of green pigs do.

The game was released on app stores globally on January 20, 2022, following a long period of being in a soft launch phase, and has received mixed critical reception.

== Gameplay ==
Angry Birds Journey is a puzzle video game that uses the same slingshot-based gameplay as previous Angry Birds games released seven years prior; the player uses a slingshot to launch birds at structures with various targets. Birds are gradually unlocked as the player progresses. Changes made in Journey include a new rating system that rewards one star instead of up to three, and new objects such as blocks made out of jelly. Players are allowed to play levels for a limited amount of time, and can earn additional play time by completing levels. Completed levels also unlock story elements and in-game currency. If play time is depleted, the player must purchase more using either in-game or real currency.

== Development and release ==
Lead designer Sandro Kvlividze stated that Angry Birds Journey was designed to "go back to Rovio's roots, but also be more approachable than any instalment before it." Development on the game began in 2019, with the first prototype being finished in March of that year.

In March 2020, Angry Birds Journey was soft launched under the title Angry Birds Casual in select regions. Nine months later, in January 2021, the game was soft launched again under its current name. The game was released globally on the App Store and Google Play on January 20, 2022.

== Reception ==
Angry Birds Journey has received mixed reception from critics and journalists. Gavin Sheehan from Bleeding Cool wrote, "reworked and streamlined, Angry Birds Journey is undoubtedly a modern Angry Birds experience, a perfect casual puzzle game to pick up and play any time." Charlie Wacholz from Android Central criticised the use of microtransactions, writing that the game "falls into step with games like Candy Crush," calling the overall experience "unnecessarily unpleasant."
