= Angry Birds Fight! =

2015 video game

- App icon
- Developers: Rovio Entertainment; Kiteretsu Inc.
- Publisher: Rovio Entertainment
- Producer: Ding Dong
- Composer: Henri Sorvali
- Series: Angry Birds
- Engine: Cocos2d
- Platforms: iOS, Android
- Release: THA: January 30, 2015; APAC: May 7, 2015; WW: June 11, 2015
- Genres: Puzzle, role-playing

Angry Birds Fight! is a 2015 puzzle role-playing video game developed by Kiteretsu Inc. and published by Rovio Entertainment. It is the eleventh instalment in the Angry Birds series. In the game, the player must match enough Angry Birds on a grid to earn enough power to defeat their opponent.

Angry Birds Fight! was released globally for mobile devices on June 11, 2015, following a short soft launch period, and was later discontinued in 2017.

== Gameplay ==
Angry Birds Fight! is a tile-matching video game that includes elements from role-playing video games. During online battles, two random players are pitted against each other in real time. Players have a limited amount of time to position three or more matching birds into a line in order to power up their bird. Bosses can also be encountered.

== Release ==
Angry Birds Fight! was first released in Asia Pacific in May 2015. It received a worldwide release on June 11 for iOS and Android.

== Reception ==
Reception

Aggregate score
Aggregator	Score
Metacritic	54/100

Review score
Publication	Score
TouchArcade	2/5

The game received mixed reviews. It holds a rating of 54/100 on Metacritic. It also holds 2 out of 5 stars on TouchArcade.
