= Amazing Alex =

2012 video game

- Developer: Rovio Entertainment
- Publisher: Rovio Entertainment
- Engine: Box2D
- Platforms: Android, iOS, Windows Phone, Windows
- Release: Android, iOS; July 12, 2012; Windows Phone; April 3, 2013
- Genre: Puzzle
- Mode: Single-player

Amazing Alex was a physics-based puzzle game created by Rovio Entertainment, developer of Angry Birds.

== Gameplay ==
The primary task was to strategically place household objects to guide a ball towards its goal. Once the objects had been placed, the player could initiate the timer, and the ball would start moving. The path and trajectory of the ball would be influenced by the placement of the objects. In addition to reaching the goal, the player could collect up to three stars that were placed throughout the level. The game also included special modes such as "Levels of the Week", "Downloaded Levels", and "My Levels".

== Development ==
Amazing Alex was announced by Rovio's CEO, Mikael Hed, on Yle's breakfast television in May 2012. The game was based on Casey's Contraptions, which was acquired by Rovio. The game featured educational elements and revolved around the character Alex, described as a curious boy with an interest in building contraptions. The goal was to create various Rube Goldberg machines to get a ball to a certain location.

On April 13, 2015, the game was removed from the App Store and Google Play.

== Reception ==
Reception

Aggregate score
Aggregator	Score
Metacritic	75/100

Harry Slater of Pocket Gamer said it is an "addictive experience", but when "compared to Angry Birds, had less excitement involved."

The game was compared to The Incredible Machine, originally released in 1993.
