= Love Rocks Starring Shakira =

2015 video game

Love Rocks
- App Store icon
- Developer: Rovio Entertainment
- Publisher: Rovio Entertainment
- Engine: Unity
- Platforms: iOS, Android
- Release: October 15, 2015
- Genre: Puzzle

Love Rocks was a mobile tile-matching puzzle video game, developed by Rovio Entertainment released on October 15, 2015, for Android and iOS devices worldwide. The game featured Colombian singer, composer and actress, Shakira. However, after several updates within its first few months, the game was discontinued and was eventually removed from the app stores in 2018.

== Gameplay ==
Players will get three gems or symbols hanging up above the level and drop them to make links of gems and/or symbols. The link of gems and/or symbols will collapse when it makes a matching link. Players will lose a turn if a gem or symbol passes the board. The player wins when the challenge of the level is complete, but loses if the player cannot do so and they also lose a 'life' record, so power-ups and extra chances can be used in these situations but will cost game coins if you have not any. When all 'life' records are lost, the player have to wait to refill it, or do an in-app purchase using the game coins. Players can beat their friends' scores by connecting through Facebook and they can also beat Shakira's personal high score in each level.

== Reception ==
A review by Tom Christiansen said that "Love Rocks Starring Shakira is the epitome of product placement in video games. This game really has little to do with Shakira, other than featuring her name and likeness." According to Rebecca McLaughlin-Duane there were comparisons made to Bejeweled "given the fact that gems need to be matched on a grid to accumulate points." On November 4, 2015, Max Willens of International Business Times stated that the game is "already a flop" ranking "No. 304 in revenue generated among gaming apps, according to mobile-app analytics firm App Annie, and it has been falling steadily since the game peaked at No. 21 last month."
