= Angry Birds (video game) =

2009 video game

- App icon for the original release
- Developer: Rovio Entertainment
- Publishers: Chillingo; Rovio Entertainment
- Producers: Raine Mäki; Harro Grönberg; Mikko Häkkinen
- Designer: Jaakko Iisalo
- Programmer: Tuomo Lehtinen
- Artist: Tuomas Erikoinen
- Composer: Ari Pulkkinen
- Series: Angry Birds
- Engine: SDL; Box2D; Unity (remake)
- Platforms: iOS; Maemo: MeeGo; HP webOS; Samsung Smart TV; Tizen; Android; Symbian^3; Series 40; Mac OS X; PlayStation 3; PlayStation Portable; Windows; Facebook (Flash); Google Chrome (Chrome Web Store); Google Plus; HTML5; WebGL; Nook; Kindle Fire/Fire HD; Windows Phone; Roku; Nokia Asha; Bada; BlackBerry 10; BlackBerry Tablet OS
- Release: iOS, Maemo: WW: December 11, 2009; HP webOS; WW: August 2010; Android; WW: October 15, 2010; Symbian^3; WW: October 22, 2010; Mac OS X, PlayStation Network, Windows; WW: January 2011; Browser; WW: May 2011; Nook, Windows Phone; WW: June 2011; Roku; WW: July 2011; Nokia Asha; WW: November 2011; Bada; WW: January 2012; BlackBerry; WW: August 2012 Rovio Classics: Angry Birds; WW: March 31, 2022
- Genres: Casual; puzzle
- Mode: Single-player

Angry Birds is a 2009 puzzle video game developed by Rovio Entertainment and published by Chillingo. It revolves around players using a slingshot to launch limbless birds at green pigs stationed in various structures, with the goal of defeating all of the pigs on the playing field. As players advance through the game, new types of birds become available, some with unique abilities.

Angry Birds was originally released for mobile devices on December 11, 2009, with several ports and patch updates having been produced thereafter. It was well received critically and commercially for its simple and addictive gameplay, comical style, and low price, becoming a mainstream phenomenon during 2010 and 2011. It was downloaded over 50 million times by 2010, appeared on several app store top charts for extended periods, and won multiple awards. Many critics consider it one of the best mobile games ever made and one of the greatest video games of all time. The success of Angry Birds led to the creation of a media franchise, including numerous television series, print media, amusement parks, and feature films. Its first spin-off, Bad Piggies, was released in 2012, and a sequel, Angry Birds 2, followed in 2015. Altogether, the Angry Birds game series had surpassed five billion downloads across all platforms by April 2022.

In early 2019, the game was discontinued alongside many of its early successors. In response, a remake titled Rovio Classics: Angry Birds was released on March 31, 2022. The remake was renamed Red's First Flight on iOS on February 23, 2023, and delisted on Android on the same day.

== Gameplay ==
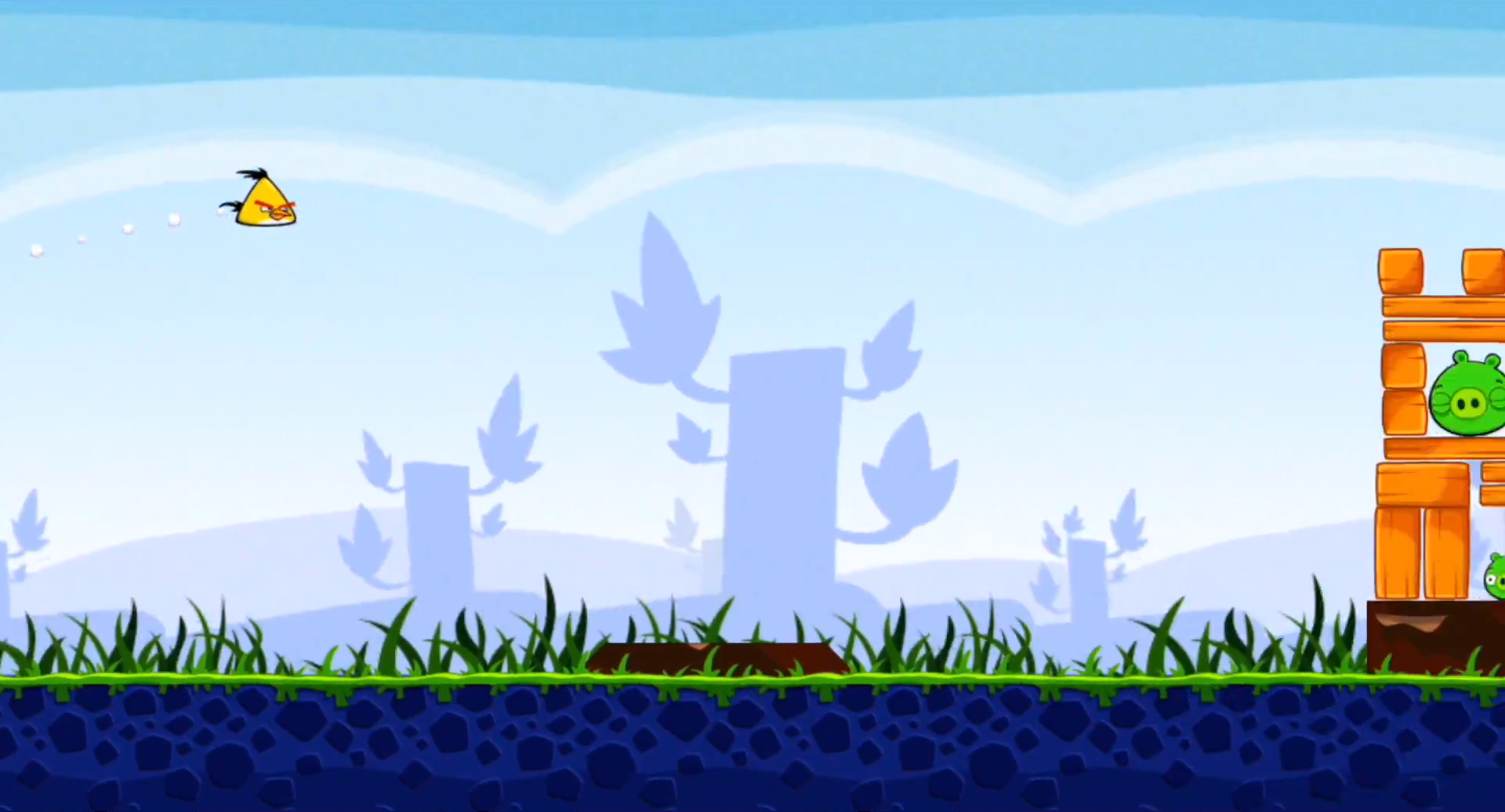
A screenshot depicting gameplay. The yellow bird Chuck is being launched at a structure, which contains pigs.

Angry Birds is a physics-based puzzle game. It follows a flock of flightless birds whose eggs have been stolen by green pigs. Using a slingshot controlled via the touchscreen, the player must launch the birds at the pigs, who are hiding in structures made of various materials, to defeat them without depleting their preset supply of birds. The player can target weak points to destroy structures, which can either drop or crush pigs. More types of birds, each with unique abilities, are unlocked as the game progresses. In each stage, the player is awarded with a star rating out of three upon depending on how many birds they used to defeat every pig, and golden eggs can be found to unlock bonus stages.

== Development ==
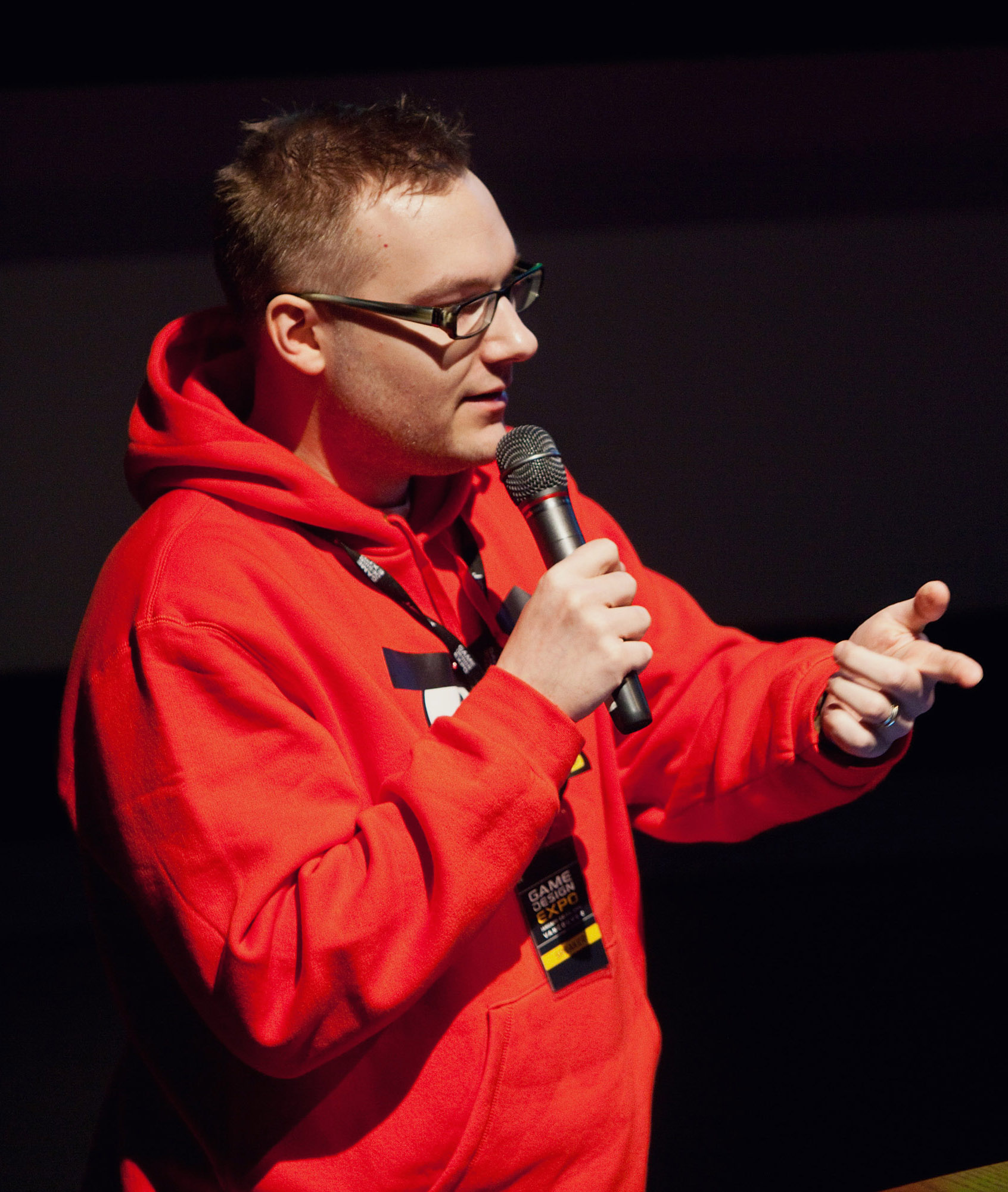
Senior game designer of Angry Birds Jaakko Iisalo at Game Design Expo 2011

Before Angry Birds, Rovio Entertainment—then known as Rovio Mobile—had developed 51 games for other publishers such as Electronic Arts as a work-for-hire studio. Peter Vesterbacka, Rovio's marketing and business developer, decided that making their own intellectual property would be more rewarding. By 2009, the company only had the funds to make one game; development on what would become Angry Birds began that March. The development team consisted of 10 people all-in-all, with four to five staying by the project's end. Among multiple concepts that were experimented with was one by designer Jaakko Iisalo, in which a flock of angry-eyebrowed birds would attack color-coded structures. The team liked the characters depicted, even though there was no clear indication of gameplay. The team had previously set a criteria to decide upon which concept to choose, but it was discarded in favour of Iisalo's concept.

When a prototype was made, test players were clueless on what to do. The developers determined that a "recognisable mechanism" was necessary; the slingshot was experimented with first, but it was initially thought to be too obvious, so other ideas such as a swing were experimented with instead. However, the slingshot was revisited as players understood how to use it immediately. Programmer Tuomo Lehtinen created the physics for slinging balls, which were later replaced with the birds, into blocks that could be knocked over. The aiming mechanism was tweaked so that players could decipher why they had failed, and the blocks were tweaked to be more satisfying to break. Structures were placed further away from the slingshot to increase anticipation and excitement.

The developers later realised the birds needed an enemy. It is believed that the 2009 swine flu pandemic was the inspiration behind making them pigs, though Iisalo claims that the pigs were inspired by drawings he had made at the age of 10. Chillingo claimed to have participated in final game polishing, such as adding visible trajectory lines, pinch to zoom, pigs' grunts, and birds somersaulting upon landing.

== Release ==
The initial iOS version of the game, which soft launched in Finland on December 1, 2009, and released internationally ten days later, included a single episode entitled "Poached Eggs" which contained three themed chapters, each with 21 levels. Rovio released free updates that include additional content, such as new levels, new in-game objects and even new birds. As updates have been released, they have been incorporated into the game's full version offered for download from each platform's application store.

The first update released on February 11, 2010, added a new episode called "Mighty Hoax", containing two new chapters with 21 levels each. Updates released on April 6, 2010, added the "Golden Eggs" feature, which placed hidden golden eggs throughout the game that would unlock bonus content when found, and a new episode called "Danger Above", which initially contained a single chapter of 15 levels, released on April 23 under version 1.3.0. Two later updates (released as version 1.3.2 on May 18, 2010, and version 1.3.3 on June 22, 2010, respectively) added two more chapters to "Danger Above", each with 15 levels. "The Big Setup" episode, released on July 16, 2010, as version 1.4.0, added a new chapter with 45 levels and additional Golden Egg levels.

A fifth episode, called "Ham 'Em High", launched on December 23, 2010, in celebration of the game's first year on the iOS App Store. "Ham 'Em High" contained 15 American Old West-themed levels in a single chapter; updates on February 4, 2011 and March 17, 2011 each added one new 15-level chapter. "Ham 'Em High" also introduced the Mighty Eagle, a new bird that may be used once per hour to clear any uncompleted levels. The Mighty Eagle can also be used in previously completed levels, without the once-per-hour limit, to play a mini-game called "Total Destruction" in which the player attempts to destroy as much of the scenery as possible, both with the standard birds and the Mighty Eagle, achieving 100% destruction earns the player a Mighty Eagle feather for the level.

In 2011, the Mighty Eagle was offered as a one-time, in-game purchase, and was initially only available for iOS, as its App Store customers have iTunes accounts with pre-linked credit cards. Rovio begun testing an Android update called the "Bad Piggy Bank" with the Elisa wireless service in Finland and T-Mobile, which allows users to charge in-app purchases, such as the Mighty Eagle, to their mobile phone bills. The service went live on Android with the release of version 2.2.0 in August 2012, using Google Play's transaction system, which allows both mobile billing and credit cards, allowing both Android phones and WiFi-only tablets to unlock the features. This version also added the power-ups from the Facebook version and added an option to pay to remove ads, allowing Android players to play the game ad-free as iOS players can.

The sixth episode, "Mine and Dine", was released on June 16, 2011, with 15 new mining-themed levels and a new Golden Egg. A July 25, 2011 update would release 15 further levels, and an update released on August 25, 2011, concluded "Mine and Dine" with the final 15 levels.

The seventh update, "Birdday Party", was released on December 11, 2011, to commemorate the second anniversary of the first release of the iOS version into the iTunes App Store. It included 15 new birthday cake-themed levels, as well as updated graphics and the addition of elements from the spin-off games, such as the scoring graphic seen in Angry Birds Rio and the introduction of Bubbles, the orange bird that first appeared in Angry Birds Seasons. The update was later released for Android and Microsoft Windows. The eighth update was released initially to iOS on March 20, 2012, in a lead-up to the release of Angry Birds Space. The new update included an animated tutorial, enhanced gameplay, redesigned user interface, and the first 15 levels of "Surf and Turf", the Angry Birds Facebook-exclusive episode. Another 15 levels were added later on August 2, 2012, with the iOS version receiving the power-ups first seen in the Facebook version.

On October 9, 2012, the final chapter of "Surf and Turf" was released, along with a new episode titled "Bad Piggies" to promote the spin-off of the same name. Another update was released on December 11, 2012, the 3rd anniversary of the game's release, with 15 new levels to "Birdday Party" and 15 new levels to "Bad Piggies". The second set of 15 levels in "Birdday Party" introduced the pink bird Stella to the game. 15 final levels were later released for the "Bad Piggies" episode on March 7, 2013. On the same day these final 15 levels were released, Angry Birds became "Free App of the Week" on the Apple App Store until March 14, 2013, and became an instant hit on the Top Free App charts on the App Store until March 18, 2013, when the app returned to the normal price of $0.99.

An update released on July 22, 2016, introduced the Mighty League, a competitive side mode in which players compete against others' scores to rank up through leagues.

=== Ports ===
Since its initial release for the Nokia N900 multimedia Internet device, and Apple's iPhone and iPod Touch mobile digital devices, Rovio has released versions of Angry Birds for additional devices. An iPad-exclusive version, Angry Birds HD, was released with the iPad mobile digital device in April 2010. In August 2010, Angry Birds was made available to the Palm Pre phone running Palm's webOS operating system through its App Catalog online store. Symbian^3 phones received a version of the game in October 2010, which initially includes only the "Poached Eggs" and "Mighty Hoax" episodes.

In May 2010, Rovio announced plans for a version for devices using Google's Android operating system, with a beta version being released through the Android Market (now Google Play) in September 2010. The full Android version of the game was first released instead on GetJar in October 2010, though it was subsequently released on Android Market within days. Rovio officials noted that GetJar had a more global reach than Android Market, and GetJar's availability on other smartphone platforms (including Symbian) would make cross-platform promotion of the game easier. Unlike the previous versions, Angry Birds for Android is a free, ad-supported application, as paid applications aren't available on Android in some nations. An update called "Bad Piggy Bank" enabled players to remove the in-game ads for a fee.

In October 2010, Microsoft suggested on one of its websites that a Windows Phone version of Angry Birds was in development. Rovio complained that Microsoft had not asked permission to make such a statement, noting that at that time it had not committed to design a Windows Phone version. Rovio would ask Microsoft to revise its site to remove references to the game, a Windows Phone version was ultimately released in June 2011.

Near the end of 2010, Rovio stated that it was developing new ports of the game, this time for devices outside of the mobile phone market. In January 2011, three of those ports launched. First, Sony announced the release of Angry Birds for its PlayStation Portable handheld system in the form of a PlayStation mini game that includes nearly 200 levels from the original game; the version is also playable on the PlayStation 3. Next, Rovio announced the release of a Windows version of the game on January 4, 2011, available for sale exclusively from the Intel AppUp center, which included 195 levels at launch and plans for exclusive features not available on the smartphone versions. One day after the Windows version was released, the Mac App Store launched, with one of the first offerings being its own version of Angry Birds. Ports of Angry Birds have also been proposed for the Wii and Nintendo DS systems, with the former becoming realized through Angry Birds Trilogy. A 3D-enhanced version of the game was proposed for release on the LG Optimus 3D in October 2011.

The popularity of Angry Birds has helped spread the game to other devices that were not initially designed as gaming machines. Barnes & Noble announced that a future update for its Nook e-reader would let the Android-based device run applications, including a port of Angry Birds. In June 2011, Rovio announced plans to partner with Roku to include a version of Angry Birds on a new model of its Internet-connected set-top box, the Roku 2 XS running the Roku OS.

In May 2011, an in-browser HTML5 version of Angry Birds was released in beta form. The game uses WebGL or Canvas and is distributed through the Chrome Web Store for use with Google's Chrome web browser. It runs on any WebGL- or Canvas-enabled browser, and features exclusive content when played on Chrome, such as exclusive levels and the so-called "Chrome Bombs". The version includes offline playability and features 60 FPS gameplay with a selection of graphics settings to accommodate a variety of hardware capabilities.

In October 2011, during Nokia World 2011, it was announced that Angry Birds would come preloaded in Nokia's Asha series of Series 40 touch handsets, aimed at emerging markets such as India, China and South Africa. In December 2011, Rovio released Angry Birds HD, Angry Birds Seasons HD, and Angry Birds Rio HD on the BlackBerry PlayBook tablet from Research In Motion. In January 2012, Angry Birds was released for devices using Bada OS.

On February 13, 2012, Angry Birds made its debut on Facebook through a public beta release. It is known as Angry Birds Friends since May 23, 2012. The version launched with two chapters from the original game, along with then exclusive "Surf and Turf" chapter. The Facebook version adds a number of new power-up items, with a maximum of two in use per level. For example, the Power Potion power-up makes the next bird larger and thus more powerful, while the King Sling power-up makes the slingshot stronger and able to launch birds higher and faster. Power-ups can be purchased in-game or given by friends who also play the game. "Surf and Turf" would later be included in the original mobile versions of the game, starting with iOS. The Facebook version features weekly tournaments among your friends, with the top 3 winners earning free in-game "Bird Coins" which can be used to purchase power-ups. A unique Green Day themed episode was introduced in the Facebook version of the game added on August 20, 2012, and was removed in December 2012.

At the 2012 Electronic Entertainment Expo in Los Angeles, California, Rovio and distribution partner Activision announced plans to bring Angry Birds and two of its spin-off games, Angry Birds Seasons and Angry Birds Rio to the PlayStation 3, Xbox 360, and Nintendo 3DS systems. Bundled together as Angry Birds Trilogy, the games were built specifically for their respective consoles, taking advantage of their unique features, such as support for PlayStation Move, Kinect, high-definition displays, and glasses-free 3D visuals. Trilogy was also ported to the Wii and Wii U almost a year later.

A motion-controlled version of the game has also been released as a Samsung Smart TV App.

On April 28, 2015, it was announced that the game was also released on Tizen smartphones by running with OpenMobile's Application Compatibility Layer (ACL) emulation technology.

=== Removal and re-release ===
Throughout 2019, several games in the Angry Birds franchise, including the original title, were removed from the App Store and Google Play without warning. Fans of the original game adopted the hashtag "#BringBack2012" (Note: Referencing the year the franchise was perceived to have "peaked" in popularity) to demand the relisting of the removed games. Responding to the campaign, Rovio explained the removal of the games on their website, citing software rot and the expiration of licensing deals. On March 31, 2022, Rovio released a new version of the original game titled Rovio Classics: Angry Birds marketed to its older fanbase. It is a remake of the game's state in 2012, replacing its proprietary engine with Unity for compatibility with newer and future devices. The remake also notably lacks microtransactions and pop-up advertisements in favor of a traditional revenue model.

In February 2023, Rovio announced that Rovio Classics: Angry Birds would be unlisted from the Google Play store and renamed to Red's First Flight on the App Store. According to Rovio, the removals and renames were due to "the game's impact on [their] wider games portfolio," such as the decreased revenue from other available Angry Birds titles.

== Reception ==
Reception

Aggregate score
Aggregator	Score
Metacritic	iOS: 80/100 iOS (HD): 81/100; PSP: 77/100

Review scores
Publication	Score
GameZone	iOS: 8.0/10
IGN	iOS: 8.0/10; PSP: 7.5/10; Android: 8.0/10
Macworld	iOS: 3.5/5
PlayStation Official Magazine – UK	PSP: 90/100
Pocket Gamer	iOS: 8.0/10
TouchArcade	iOS: 5/5

In reviews, Angry Birds has been praised by critics. Chris Holt of Macworld called the game "an addictive, clever, and challenging puzzler," and Pocket Gamer's Keith Andrew said Angry Birds is "a nugget of puzzling purity dished out with relish aplenty." Jonathan Liu of Wired News wrote that "going for the maximum number of stars certainly adds a lot of replay value to a fairly extensive game."

Reviews for the first versions of the game that did not use a touch-screen—the PlayStation 3, PlayStation Portable, and the Windows version—have also been positive, but with some disagreement over the different interfaces. Will Greenwald of PC Magazine, in his review of the PlayStation Network version, said that the control scheme on these platforms is good, "but they're not nearly as satisfying as the touch-screen controls found on smartphone versions," and that the PlayStation 3 version appeared "blocky and unpleasant, like a smartphone screen blown up to HDTV size." Conversely, Greg Miller of IGN preferred the analog control setup of the PSP version, saying it "offered me tiny variances in control that I don't feel like I get with my fat finger on a screen." While giving the game a positive review, Miller concluded, "There's no denying that Angry Birds is fun, but it could use polish – such as sharper visuals, a better price and smoother action." Damien McFerrin of British website Electric Pig reviewed the PC version, saying "the mouse-driven control method showcases many distinct advantages over its finger-focused counterpart."

Angry Birds has also been described critically as impossible to understand the playing rules criteria by game critic Chris Schiller of Eurogamer, which has 'a contemptuous attitude towards its players, keeping them just frustrated enough not to switch off and play something else instead.'

=== Sales ===
Angry Birds became the top-selling paid application on Apple's UK App Store in February 2010, and reached the top spot on the US App Store a few weeks later, where it remained until October 2010. Since release, the free, limited version of Angry Birds has been downloaded more than 11 million times for Apple's iOS, and the full-featured paid version has been downloaded nearly 7 million times as of September 2010. The Android version of the game was downloaded more than 1 million times within the first 24 hours of release, even though the site crashed at one point due to the load, and over 2 million downloads in its first weekend. Rovio receives approximately US$1 million per month in revenue from the advertising that appears in the free Android version.

In November 2010, Digital Trends stated that "with 36 million downloads, Angry Birds is one of the most mainstream games out right now." MSNBC's video game news blog has written that "[n]o other game app comes close" to having such a following. The Christian Science Monitor has remarked, "Angry Birds has been one of the great runaway hits of 2010." In December 2010, in honor of the one-year anniversary of the release of Angry Birds, Rovio Mobile announced that the game had been downloaded 50 million times, with more than 12 million on iOS devices and 10 million on Android.

In the history of the Apple App Store, Angry Birds holds the record for most days at the top of the Paid Apps chart, having spent a total of 275 days at the no. 1 position; Angry Birds Rio has been no. 1 for a total of 23 days, ranking ninth on the list. In Apple's "iTunes Rewind" list of the most popular iTunes Store media for 2011, Angry Birds was the top-selling paid iPhone/iPod app on the App Store and its free version was the fourth-most downloaded. The game's two special-edition versions, Angry Birds Seasons and Angry Birds Rio, were also ranked in the top 10 for paid iPhone/iPod apps, while its iPad-exclusive Angry Birds HD versions were the top-selling and top-downloaded iPad apps for the year.

=== Awards ===
In February 2010, Angry Birds was a nominee for the "Best Casual Game" award at the sixth annual International Mobile Gaming Awards in Barcelona, Spain. In September 2010, IGN named Angry Birds as the fourth best iPhone game of all time. In April 2011, Angry Birds won both the "Best Game App" and "App of the Year" at the UK Appy Awards. At the 2011 Webby Awards, Angry Birds was awarded "Best Game for Handheld Devices".

At the 14th Annual Interactive Achievement Awards (now known as the D.I.C.E. Awards), Angry Birds HD was awarded with "Casual Game of the Year", and also received nominations for "Outstanding Innovation in Gaming" and "Game of the Year". It is the first mobile game in the ceremony's history to be nominated for "Game of the Year".

In May 2026, Angry Birds was inducted into the World Video Game Hall of Fame.

== Expanded franchise ==
Angry Birds has since spawned a number of spin-offs and successors. The series' first spin-off, Bad Piggies, was released on September 27, 2012. In 2015, a direct sequel titled Angry Birds 2 was released, featuring two new birds: a Peale's falcon named Silver and a potoo named Melody.

In March 2013, Rovio announced the animated series Angry Birds Toons, with 52 episodes planned for weekly release. The series was scheduled to debut on television on March 16 and become available through a video channel within Angry Birds games on March 17. In 2016, a film adaptation titled The Angry Birds Movie was released.

== See also ==
- Angry Birds Toons
