= Bad Piggies =

2012 video game

- App icon
- Developer: Rovio Entertainment
- Publishers: Rovio Entertainment; Focus Multimedia (PC)
- Producers: Petri Järvilehto; Mikael Hed; Jaakko Haapasalo
- Designers: Markus Tuppurainen; Peter Urbanics
- Programmers: Marco Rapino; Miika Virpioja; Mauricio Hollando; Jussi Markkanen
- Composer: Ilmari Hakkola
- Series: Angry Birds
- Engine: Unity 3D
- Platforms: Android; iOS; OS X; Windows; Windows Phone
- Release: September 27, 2012; Windows Phone: April 2014
- Genres: Puzzle, sandbox
- Mode: Single-player

Bad Piggies is a 2012 puzzle video game developed by Rovio Entertainment. It is a spinoff in the Angry Birds series and revolves around the green pigs rather than the birds. The player is tasked with building custom vehicles using various objects to guide a pig to the finish line, with levels having multiple solutions and optional additional goals achievable by applying alternate strategies. A sandbox mode, which allows the player to freely build any vehicle, is also featured.

Bad Piggies was initially released on September 27, 2012, being ported to multiple mobile devices and personal computers. It received positive reviews from critics, who praised its differences from other Angry Birds games but criticised its high difficulty, and has been downloaded 100 million times. A sequel, titled Bad Piggies 2, was soft launched in 2023.

== Gameplay ==
A screenshot of gameplay depicting a vehicle with two fans on each end, with the left one active. The player character is riding the vehicle from the middle crate.

Bad Piggies is a physics-based puzzle game revolving around the green pigs from previous Angry Birds games. The pigs aim to steal the Angry Birds' eggs, but their plans are shredded in a fan and become scattered. Thus, the pieces must be recovered by finding them in areas divided into levels. In each level, the player is provided with a set of attachable objects such as crates, wheels, bellows, balloons, umbrellas, soft drink bottles, and coil springs, with more being unlocked as the game progresses. The objects provided must be arranged on a square grid to construct a custom vehicle that can guide the pig to the finish line and recover pieces of the plan. There is no set solution for each level, so the player must come up with one themself. Alternatively, the player can press a "Hire a Mechanic" button to have a mechanic pig build a vehicle for them.

Each object comes with different behaviours that can be triggered by the player; for instance, fans can be toggled, boxes of TNT can be detonated, and balloons can be popped to decrease height. Vehicles can break apart while active, and the pig will be ejected if they do; levels must be manually restarted if the player gets stuck. Levels have three goals that can be achieved to earn stars; the first is achieved by clearing the level, while the latter two include reaching the finish line within a time limit, collecting crates, or excluding a select object from the vehicle.

Bad Piggies additionally includes a sandbox mode, which contains large open environments where players can freely build any custom vehicle. An extra sandbox level can be unlocked by collecting skulls hidden throughout other levels. More content was introduced to Bad Piggies after its launch via updates; in February 2015, a sandbox level featuring icy surfaces titled "Little Pig Adventure" was added alongside the gearbox, which allows vehicles to travel backwards.

Bad Piggies is compatible with the Everyplay mobile app, which allows players to record and watch replays of their previous gameplay. The iOS version is compatible with Apple Inc.'s Game Center service, which is used for achievements and to compare progress with friends.

== Release ==
Bad Piggies was released for Android, iOS, and OS X on September 27, 2012. Ports for Windows 8, Windows Phone, and personal computers followed after; the Windows and computer versions were published by Focus Multimedia in October for £10.20, while Rovio Entertainment released the Windows Phone version in April 2014. In February 2015, Bad Piggies reached 100 million downloads.

A counterfeit app titled Bad Pigs was released on May 25, 2013, and received over 10,000 downloads. On June 12, it was delisted from Google Play for containing malware.

== Reception ==
Reception

Aggregate score
Aggregator	Score
Metacritic	iOS: 83/100

Review scores
Publication	Score
CNET Gamecenter	8.3/10
IGN	9.2/10
Pocket Gamer	8/10
TouchArcade	iOS: 5/5
VentureBeat	85/100

Award
Publication	Award
Pocket Gamer	Silver Award

According to the review aggregation website Metacritic, the iOS version of Bad Piggies was received as "generally favorable" based on 24 critic reviews. Eli Hodapp, writing for TouchArcade, gave it a 5-star rating and praised its accessibility, claiming that it "tak[es] the franchise in a direction that feels both totally fresh and entirely appropriate". Justin Davis from IGN considered the design "impeccable" and praised its creative freedom and pricing. He called it "a much deeper, more rewarding and more creative experience than anything Rovio has produced previously" and "the best title Rovio has released yet".

Jason Parker from CNET stated that Bad Piggies is "much more challenging than the Angry Birds variations you're used to". Although he commented that its unfamiliar difficulty may alienate players, he called its gameplay "a unique and interesting new game type that will appeal to both casual and serious puzzle gaming fans". Stuart Dredge from The Guardian, similarly to Parker, wrote that "experienced gamers will love Bad Piggies" while casual players may struggle.

Mark Brown for Pocket Gamer gave Bad Piggies a Silver Award in his review. He believed it does not "have the simple, kinetic thrill of Angry Birds" but found the physics-based gameplay to be "quite attractive". He stated the game is "creative, addictive, and absolutely packed with content", but additionally criticised it for "feel[ing] a little too safe and predictable". Chris Plante from Polygon criticised the main campaign, calling it "a fine distraction" that "isn't open enough" and "doesn't promote creativity". He heavily preferred the sandbox levels, writing that they are "where Bad Piggies makes good on its potential".

Three people covered Bad Piggies for VentureBeat. James Pikover, a critic, gave a score of 85 out of 100; he wrote that its "depth of puzzles and creative building aspect will keep players hungrily coming back for more" but criticised the game's difficulty for not being designed for casual players. Jesse Divnich, an analyst, gave a score of 75, calling it "a sign that Rovio is still gun-shy on experimentation" while considering it a "sane business decision" overall. Devin Monnens, an academic, gave a score of 90, and praised its themes of inventing and engineering.

== Sequel ==
A sequel to Bad Piggies was conceptualised between 2018 and 2019. In the latter year, concept art for a sequel titled Bad Piggies 2 was uploaded by one of Rovio's artists. It depicted an outer space setting and a playing card system also seen in Angry Birds 2 (2015), but the concept was quickly abandoned altogether. In 2021, Bad Piggies 2 was announced via three advertisements on TikTok. In 2023, it was soft launched in select European countries for iOS devices, with a planned Android release later.
