= Bloodstroke =

2014 video game

- Developer: Chimera Entertainment
- Publisher: Chillingo
- Platforms: iOS, Android
- Release: iOS; January 30, 2014; Android; July 29, 2014
- Genre: Shoot 'em up
- Mode: Single-player

Bloodstroke, also known as John Woo's Bloodstroke, is a shoot 'em up game developed by Chimera Entertainment and published by Chillingo for iOS and Android in 2014.

== Reception ==
Reception

Aggregate score
Aggregator	Score
Metacritic	67/100

Review scores
Publication	Score
GamesMaster	59%
Gamezebo	4/5
MacLife	2/5
Pocket Gamer	2.5/5
TouchArcade	4/5
Digital Spy	2/5

The iOS version received "average" reviews according to the review aggregation website Metacritic. Gamezebo said that "even though the game might be a little too easy at times with a score system that greatly favors your melee attacks over your weapon-based ones, Bloodstroke is still a bloody and beautiful good time." TouchArcade called it "a terrific action game, and a great introduction to John Woo action on mobile." GamesMaster said there was "precious little substance" in the game. However, Pocket Gamer said, "A lightweight, odd action game that never makes you feel part of the fun, Bloodstroke is too muddled to really recommend." Digital Spy called it "a stylized collection of half-realized ideas that don't quite live up to their potential." MacLife gave it a negative review, saying, "Bloodstroke pays lip service to John Woo's bloody brand of action, but it lacks any grace, efficiency, or flair. Cool art style notwithstanding, Bloodstroke's clumsy controls doom it from the start."
