= Nibblers (video game) =

2015 video game

- Game icon
- Developer: Rovio Entertainment
- Publisher: Rovio Entertainment
- Platforms: iOS, Android
- Release: 10 September 2015
- Genre: Puzzle
- Mode: Single-player

Nibblers (also known as Fruit Nibblers) is a Finnish mobile tile-matching puzzle video game, developed by Rovio Entertainment. It was released on 10 September 2015 for Android and iOS devices worldwide.

In the game, fish called "Nibblers" have wandered ashore to eat fruits, such as berries and melons. However, the lizards want to stop them. So, with the player's help, the Nibblers set on to defeat the lizards.

== Gameplay ==
Players match up three or more pieces of fruit. Matching three next to a lizard stuns it and then matching three more defeats it. Matching up four or more pieces summons Nibblers, as well as other sea creatures, that will attack lizards directly; a level ends when all lizards are defeated.

== Reception ==
Android Authority gave the game a 7/10 because, although the game has cute graphics and can prove somewhat addictive, it has no special features that would set it apart from hundreds of other, similar 'match-3 games'. The reviewer also discussed not liking the fact that the life meter limits play due to taking 2.5 hours for each heart to regenerate - or else by paying actual money in order to overcome the waiting time.

At the Finnish Game Music Awards 2016, Nibblers was awarded best game music; the soundtrack was composed by Salla Hakkola.
