= Angry Birds Epic =

2014 video game

- App icon
- Developer: Chimera Entertainment
- Publisher: Rovio Entertainment
- Directors: Bernhard Falk; Alexander Kehr; Andreas Katzig; Christian Dreher
- Producers: Anastasios Katopodis; Joseph McNerney; Michael Stapf; Hendrik Lesser
- Designer: Boris Conrad Heisserer
- Programmers: Max Dienersberger; Hubert Scharfetter
- Artists: Markus Holzer; Anna Tluczykont; Daniel Spengler; Adrian vom Baur
- Composer: Henri Sorvali
- Series: Angry Birds
- Platforms: Android iOS; Windows Phone
- Release: AU/CAN: March 17, 2014; WW: June 12, 2014
- Genre: Role-playing
- Modes: Single-player, multiplayer

Angry Birds Epic is a 2014 role-playing video game developed by Chimera Entertainment and published by Rovio Entertainment. It deviates from previous titles in the Angry Birds series by featuring turn-based battles and other role-playing elements.

== Gameplay ==
Angry Birds Epic is a turn-based role-playing game. Set on a fantasy version of Piggy Island, which the player must explore to progress, it follows a narrative in which the player's party of birds rescues their stolen eggs from green pigs by fighting them in turn-based battles. Combat is controlled entirely via the touchscreen; the player sends a bird to attack a pig by dragging the former onto the latter, activates a defensive move by tapping them, or have one bird boost a teammate's statistics by dragging a bird onto another bird. Only one of these choices can be made per turn. A special move can be activated using a chilli pepper, which gains more power with each attack. Various types of pigs can be encountered, and each possess moves such as strong charged attacks, smoke screens, targeting, and resurrecting or summoning allies. Characters can undergo status effects such as poison and sleep.

The player's party can be levelled up and given armour, weapons, shields, and potions. The former two can be crafted using loot, which involves rolling a die to determine the change in statistics. Loot is gained from clearing levels, upon which the reward is decided by a roulette wheel. Birds can be assigned character classes by swapping their headwear, which in turn alters their moveset. Multiple parts of the game require paying real money or watching advertisements; the former is needed for potions and resurrecting birds, while the latter boosts attack power.

== Release and promotion ==
Angry Birds Epic was announced via a teaser trailer in March 2014. It was soft launched in Australia, Canada, and New Zealand, before being released worldwide for Android, iOS, Windows Phone on June 12, 2014. Elements from Angry Birds Epic were featured in GungHo Online Entertainment's mobile game Puzzle & Dragons from October 20 until November 2. In September 2015, Sonic the Hedgehog was added to Epic as a limited-time unlockable character, following an event in which Angry Birds characters were available in Sonic Dash.

== Reception ==
Reception

Aggregate score
| Aggregator | Score |
|---|---|
| Metacritic | 70/100 |

Review score
| Publication | Score |
|---|---|
| TouchArcade | 3.5/5 |

The game has received generally favorable reviews with a Metacritic score of 70/100 based on 14 reviews. CNET praised the solid gameplay, but did not like the numerous in-app purchases combined with the slow delivery of in-game items, as well as the always online to play requirement.
