= Angry Birds 2 =

2015 video game

- Original splash screen
- Developer: Rovio Entertainment
- Publisher: Rovio Entertainment
- Composer: Two Feathers
- Series: Angry Birds
- Platforms: Android iOS; Windows
- Release: CAN: March 2015; WW: July 30, 2015
- Genres: Puzzle, strategy
- Mode: Single-player

Angry Birds 2 is a 2015 puzzle and strategy video game developed and published by Rovio Entertainment for mobile devices. It is the sequel to Angry Birds (2009) and follows the gameplay of the Angry Birds series alongside additions such as randomly-chosen birds and magic spells. The game was soft launched under the name Angry Birds: Under Pigstruction in Canada in March 2015, before receiving a full release for Android and iOS under its new name on July 30, 2015. It has received mixed critical reception and has been downloaded over 20 million times.

== Gameplay ==
Angry Birds 2 uses similar gameplay mechanics to its predecessor.

Angry Birds 2 is a puzzle and strategy video game. It continues the gameplay of its predecessors; the Bad Piggies have stolen the Angry Birds' eggs, which must be recovered by launching birds from slingshots at structures containing the pigs. The player progresses by defeating every pig in each level. New features are included in addition to this. Levels consist of multiple stages and are randomly-generated, and players are able to choose which bird they use rather than there being a specific order. Birds are assigned via randomly-selected playing cards of the currently-unlocked birds, which can include a new bird named Silver. Cards can be added by filling a "destruction meter" or, if there are any surviving pigs when all cards are gone, by paying with in-game currency. In addition to birds, spells can be used, including a rain of rubber ducks, a blizzard, and a chili pepper. Bosses can also be encountered; the player must use the level environment to deplete the boss' health bar. The player is given five lives to beat levels, which deplete when a level is failed; once all lives have been depleted, they must be regenerated by waiting 30 minutes, watching an advertisement, or paying with in-game currency.

An alternate mode, the Arena, is also included. In the Arena, players can challenge others from around the world to rank up in a leaderboard and unlock upgrades.

== Release ==
Angry Birds 2 was soft launched on the App Store under the title Angry Birds: Under Pigstruction in Canada in March 2015 to gather player feedback. It was fully released for iOS and Android worldwide on July 30, 2015. Upon its full launch, the game received backlash for its use and encouragement of microtransactions.

In 2025, a limited-time event based on Angry Birds Space (2012) was announced at that year's TwitchCon Block Party. It was held from October 24 until November 21. In January 2026, a special version of Angry Birds 2 was announced to be released in China.

== Reception ==
=== Critical response ===
Reception

Aggregate score
Aggregator	Score
Metacritic	66/100

Review scores
Publication	Score
IGN	6.7/10
Pocket Gamer	7/10
TouchArcade	5/5
PC Magazine	4/5

Award
Publication	Award
Pocket Gamer	Bronze Award

On Metacritic, a review aggregator website, Angry Birds 2 has a score of 66 based on 24 critic reviews, indicating "mixed or average" reception. Despite this, several critics gave highly-positive scores and reviews. Harry Slater from Pocket Gamer gave Angry Birds 2 a Bronze Award, writing that it "bubbles and ripples with charm and wit" and that most of the game's changes are "a step forward" and "for the better". Eli Hodapp of TouchArcade wrote a 5-star review in which he praises the randomised levels, boss fights, and improved visuals. He considered Angry Birds 2 to be "the best Angry Birds [game] yet" from a gameplay perspective.

Justin Davis, writing for IGN, criticised the life regeneration system, a lack of puzzle-solving levels, and the payment model, comparing the latter to that of the original Angry Birds game. He also wrote that the negatives do not detract from the "core tension" derived from the need for precision, but the gameplay still felt "superficial" and "a pale shadow of what Angry Birds can provide when at its best".

Jordan Minor for PC Magazine wrote that Angry Birds 2's "sequel status" is justified. He praised its "beautiful" visuals but called its use of in-app purchases "disappointing".

=== Sales ===
Angry Birds 2 was downloaded one million times within 12 hours of its release. On August 3, 2015, Rovio tweeted that it had reached 10 million downloads. On August 6, it reached 20 million downloads from over 100 countries.
