= The Angry Birds Movie =

2016 film by Clay Kaytis and Fergal Reilly

- Theatrical release poster
- Directed by: Clay Kaytis; Fergal Reilly
- Written by: Jon Vitti
- Story by: Mikael Hed; Mikko Pöllä; John Cohen
- Based on: Angry Birds by Rovio Entertainment
- Produced by: John Cohen; Catherine Winder
- Starring: Jason Sudeikis; Josh Gad; Danny McBride; Maya Rudolph; Kate McKinnon; Sean Penn; Tony Hale; Keegan-Michael Key; Bill Hader; Peter Dinklage
- Edited by: Kent Beyda; Ally Garrett
- Music by: Heitor Pereira
- Production companies: Columbia Pictures; Rovio Animation
- Distributed by: Sony Pictures Releasing
- Release dates: May 7, 2016 (Los Angeles); May 13, 2016 (Finland); May 20, 2016 (United States)
- Running time: 97 minutes
- Countries: Finland; United States
- Language: English
- Budget: $73 million
- Box office: $352.3 million

The Angry Birds Movie, also known as Angry Birds, is a 2016 animated comedy film based on the Angry Birds video game series. It was directed by Clay Kaytis and Fergal Reilly, written by Jon Vitti, and stars the voices of Jason Sudeikis, Josh Gad, Danny McBride, Maya Rudolph, Kate McKinnon, Sean Penn, Tony Hale, Keegan-Michael Key, Bill Hader, and Peter Dinklage. The film follows Red (Sudeikis), an outcast on an island of flightless birds, who suspects a newly arrived crew of green pigs, led by Leonard (Hader), of plotting an evil plan and attempts to stop them with the help of his newfound friends Chuck (Gad) and Bomb (McBride).

After having received offers from Hollywood studios since 2010, franchise owner Rovio Entertainment announced an Angry Birds film adaptation in 2012. In 2013, Sony Pictures won the distribution rights in an auction. Rovio produced and funded the film themselves while Sony Pictures Imageworks provided animation. The Angry Birds Movie is the most expensive Finnish film, as roughly $400 million was spent on the marketing and distribution on top of the $73 million production budget. To promote the film, Rovio collaborated with numerous brands and released the mobile game Angry Birds Action! as a tie-in.

The Angry Birds Movie premiered at the Regency Village Theatre in Westwood, Los Angeles on May 7, 2016, and was released in the United States on May 20, 2016, by Sony Pictures Releasing through its Columbia Pictures label. The film received mixed reviews from critics and grossed $352 million, becoming the second highest-grossing film based on a video game and the highest-grossing Finnish film of all time. It was followed by two sequels: The Angry Birds Movie 2 in 2019 and The Angry Birds Movie 3 in 2026.

== Plot ==
Red, a bird with a short temper, is an outcast who lives on the outskirts of Bird Island, an island inhabited by flightless birds unaware of other islands. When a bird family berates Red for delivering their son's hatchday cake late, Red snaps at the father, resulting in Red accidentally prematurely hatching their baby. Red similarly argues with Judge Peckinpah at his hearing and is sentenced to anger management class, taught by reformed anger convict Matilda. Red meets his classmates: Chuck, a hyperactive speedster; Bomb, who detonates uncontrollably; and Terence, a threatening, gargantuan bird who only communicates in grunts. Chuck and Bomb try to befriend Red, but he avoids them.

The following day, a boat docks at the island's shore, damaging Red's house. The birds greet two green pigs, the captain Leonard and his assistant Ross, who claim to be peaceful explorers offering friendship. They introduce the birds to various innovations, including a giant slingshot, but Red becomes suspicious of the pigs' motives and sneaks onto Leonard's boat. Chuck and Bomb follow Red, and they find more pigs hidden below deck, contradicting Leonard's claim that he and Ross are alone. When Red returns to expose Leonard, everyone accepts Leonard's explanation that he only lied to see if Bird Island was safe for his simple-minded cousins.

Still suspicious of the pigs, Red recruits Chuck and Bomb to find Mighty Eagle, Bird Island's missing protector and the only bird who can fly. They find Mighty Eagle on the island's tallest mountain, but he reveals himself to be an overweight, self-absorbed slacker who has retired from flying. Red witnesses the pigs planting explosives around the island and stealing the eggs while the birds are distracted by a party. Mighty Eagle refuses to help them, and Red admonishes him. Red and Bomb try to stop the pigs while Chuck warns the other birds, but the pigs destroy the village and escape with the eggs. The entire bird community, devastated and disoriented by the theft of their eggs, turn to Red for guidance, and Red rallies them to embrace their anger. They build a raft from the rubble, using the pigs' slingshot as the sail, and follow the pigs to Piggy Island.

The birds discover the pigs living in a walled city ruled by Leonard, known to the pigs as King Mudbeard. Deducing that the eggs are in Leonard's castle, the birds use the slingshot to launch themselves over the walls and into the castle. Most of the birds—including Matilda and Peckinpah—miss the castle but destroy other buildings and cause chaos on the streets; Red, Chuck, and Bomb are the only ones successfully shot into the castle before Terence accidentally breaks the slingshot. The pigs lower a net containing the eggs into a boiling pot, intending to serve them at a royal banquet. Mighty Eagle has a change of heart and arrives to retrieve Chuck, Bomb, and the eggs. Leonard sends a fleet of pig planes to attack the birds; Matilda and Terence lead the other birds out of the city as Bomb stops the fleet by purposely exploding for the first time. One egg falls out of the net and Red battles Leonard for it. They fall into a room containing the pigs' reserve of explosives, which Leonard accidentally ignites. The room explodes, destroying the city, but the empty pot falls on top of Red, shielding him and the egg from the blast.

All of the families, except for one, reunite with their eggs. Red emerges with three blue hatchlings (Note: Identified offscreen as the Blues) and returns them to their parents. Mighty Eagle takes credit for saving the eggs, claiming that he appeared lazy to Red, Chuck, and Bomb so that they could lose faith in him to find faith in themselves. While restoring the village, the birds rebuild Red's house and relocate it into the village. Red happily welcomes Chuck and Bomb inside. Meanwhile, the pigs survive their home's destruction, and Leonard plots a new plan.

== Voice cast ==
- Jason Sudeikis as Red, a red bird with a short temper
  - Aiden McGraw voices young Red.
- Josh Gad as Chuck, a hyperactive, fast-talking yellow bird with superspeed abilities
- Danny McBride as Bomb, a black bird who explodes uncontrollably
- Maya Rudolph as Matilda, a white hen who runs the anger management class
- Kate McKinnon as Stella, a friendly and knowledgeable pink bird
  - McKinnon also voices Eva the Birthday Mom, whose younger son is accidentally hatched by Red.
- Sean Penn as Terence, a large bird who only communicates non-verbally, such as with grunts
- Tony Hale as:
  - Ross, a pig who serves as Leonard's loyal but clumsy assistant
  - Mime, a mime artist bird
  - Cyrus, a sneezy bird whom Judge Peckinpah stands on top of
- Keegan-Michael Key as Judge Peckinpah, the short-statured judge of Bird Island
- Bill Hader as Leonard, the leader of the green pigs from Piggy Island
- Peter Dinklage as Mighty Eagle, the legendary protector of Bird Island and the only bird capable of flight

Additionally, Anthony Padilla and Ian Hecox—a comedy duo known for Smosh—voice Hal, a green bird with boomerang-like abilities, and Bubbles, a small orange bird who can inflate his body to a massive size, respectively. Hannibal Buress voices Edward the Birthday Dad, Eva's husband. Blake Shelton voices Earl, a country musician pig. Charli XCX voices Willow, a turquoise bird.

== Production ==
=== Development ===
In 2010, Rovio Entertainment received offers from several Hollywood studios and agencies with interest in a film adaptation of their 2009 video game Angry Birds. The company's CEO and founder, Mikael Hed, envisioned a stop motion film similar to productions by Aardman Animations. While Peter Levin and Russell Binder helped them set up entertainment deals, Rovio would focus on producing successors to Angry Birds to "make sure the brand is relevant when the movie comes out".

Rovio was reported to be developing a feature film by 2011. When discussing the project that year, it was agreed upon that the birds should not be depicted as they are in the film until its release. This was to give the film "a chance to be really special in a world where there's a lot of games and other animation out there." The success of the Angry Birds Toons television series, according to Rovio employee Jami Laes in 2014, "validated" the idea of creating a feature film.

The film was officially announced as a computer-animated film in December 2012, on the game's third anniversary, after "months of speculation"; Justin Davis from IGN called the announcement "the culmination of Rovio's multimedia ambitions". John Cohen, who previously produced Despicable Me (2010), had signed on to produce alongside Catherine Winder and David Maisel, the latter of whom signed on as executive producer. Winder recruited talent who "understood the vision of the project". Maisel had previously been addicted to the game, and helped Rovio maintain creative control over the film. Fergal Reilly and Clay Kaytis were brought on as co-directors in 2013, marking their directorial debut after having worked in animation for several years. The duo got along well as they had a "shared comedic sensibility and creative vision for the film."

Rovio developed, financed, and produced the film themselves, while Sony Pictures won the distribution rights in a 2013 auction. Skywalker Sound handled post-production audio services. The Angry Birds Movie was produced at a cost of US$73 million, giving it the largest budget in Finland's film industry, exceeding the €8.5 million budget for Big Game (2014). In August 2015, Rovio announced that they were expecting to cut 250 jobs, equaling 40% of the company, leaving the only sector spared being personnel working on The Angry Birds Movie.

=== Writing ===
The Angry Birds Movie was written by Jon Vitti, who had previously written for the animated sitcom The Simpsons. Reilly and Kaytis were both curious and sceptical of the film upon receiving the offer from Cohen, but were convinced after reading Vitti's script. Using it as a starting point, the duo heavily reworked the latter half of the film to strike a balance between entertaining action and comedy.

Rovio granted them strong creative freedom with the character's personalities, telling them to "create something special for us — something that stands on its own, apart from the game, and that's a whole new world, a whole new canvas to illustrate all these characters and bring them to life." The character's abilities from the video games influenced their backstories on how they ended up in anger management. Red's frustrations were inspired by real-life experiences to make him relatable; the duo tasked the crew to "go observe what annoys [them] over the weekend and bring it back." Bomb's explosions were given a "twist" in which he cannot control them; the duo dubbed this as intermittent explosive disorder.

=== Casting ===
In October 2014, Jason Sudeikis, Josh Gad, Danny McBride, Bill Hader, Maya Rudolph, and Peter Dinklage were revealed to have been cast in starring roles. Kate McKinnon, Keegan-Michael Key, Tony Hale, Ike Barinholtz, Hannibal Buress, Cristela Alonzo, Jillian Bell, Romeo Santos, Anthony Padilla, and Ian Hecox were announced as additional voice cast members. Cohen was "extremely proud of this cast," stating that the stars are "surrounded by an all-star ensemble of emerging comedic talent — these are some of the funniest people out there today, and we're thrilled to have them all on board."

Gad initially declined his role as Chuck; he did not want to play an animated character similar to his previous voice role, Olaf in the Disney film Frozen (2013). He was convinced after being given a visual pitch via a story reel that "blew [his] socks off". Gad lost his voice from speaking "so high and fast," needing physical therapy between recording sessions. Sudeikis improvised lines to make Red more empathetic, feeling that "we should always feel that there was something else going on, not just raw anger", as the directors did not want to make Red seem unlikable. Blake Shelton agreed to his voice role on the condition that he could write an original song for the film.

=== Animation and design ===
Vancouver-based studio Sony Pictures Imageworks provided primary animation services. Hed believed it was important that Rovio found "the perfect partner—in style, talent and location—to bring the Angry Birds movie to life," and that choosing Imageworks was an easy decision. In total, The Angry Birds Movie consists of 1,700 shots.

According to Kaytis, the characters were designed to be "visually simple", appealing, and reminiscent to their original two-dimensional aesthetic; the faces were a point of focus before the rest of the body, and were intended to be "a recognizable version of what was in the game". An ornithologist was brought in to provide details about birds and how they move, but the realism was rejected in favor of making the birds cartoon creatures inspired by the Muppets; "These guys are like creatures. They're like representations of birds in this world, but they're like little characters", said Reilly. Red originally had a look and stance that was more bird-like, but the finalised "anthropomorphic creature" design was settled upon during the sculpting stage, according to character art director Francesca Natale. The fur and feathers took several months for Sony to develop.

== Music ==
Two official soundtracks were released: the main official soundtrack, which was released on May 6, 2016, and an album consisting of the film's score composed by Heitor Pereira, which was released a week later on May 13.

== Themes ==
The film's story of "good and evil" has been interpreted as a metaphor for white supremacy; Red, whom Matt Goldberg from Collider called "cynic[al] and also kind of xenophobic", holds distrust of the pigs who plan to steal the birds' eggs but claim to be peaceful explorers, and later leads the other birds into war against the pigs. Radheyan Simonpillai of Now compared the pigs to immigrants. Oppositely, Megan Garber wrote for The Atlantic that The Angry Birds Movie explores colonialism as well as "the seductions of consumer culture, and [...] the compromises that must be made, in a civil society, between the individual interest and the common good", calling it a "meditation on family values, and on soft power versus hard" and comparing it to Donald Trump through "a leader who ends up being all bluster".

== Release ==
=== Theatrical ===
The Angry Birds Movie was initially scheduled to be released on July 1, 2016, but it was moved forward to May 20. The premiere was held at the Regency Village Theatre in Westwood, Los Angeles on May 7, 2016, accompanied by a carnival and petting zoo. It was released in Finland on May 13 and in the United States on May 20, in RealD 3D and 4DX. An animated short film titled The Early Hatchling Gets the Worm was shown alongside the film in select theaters. The Angry Birds Movie was re-released for its tenth anniversary in select theatres for a week starting November 13, 2026.

=== Marketing ===
Sony's marketing campaign for The Angry Birds Movie began nine months before the film's release. The marketing budget was an estimated $400 million, which, along with its production budget, was the biggest budget for an animated Sony Pictures film. The teaser trailer was released in September 2015, receiving generally negative reception. Tie-ins with McDonald's, Citroën, Ziploc, and Panasonic were used to promote the film. Rovio collaborated with The Lego Group to produce Lego The Angry Birds Movie, a line of six Lego construction toy sets. A balloon themed after Red debuted at the 2015 Macy's Thanksgiving Day Parade.

The mobile game Angry Birds Action! was released during the lead-up to The Angry Birds Movie's release, and serves as a prequel to the film. In-game features could be unlocked by scanning "BirdCodes" found on tie-in products and in the film's credits, the latter of which unlocks a post-credits scene. Over 1 billion BirdCodes were distributed by augmented reality provider Zappar.

=== Home media ===
The Angry Birds Movie was released on digital HD on July 29, 2016, and on Blu-ray, 4K/3D Blu-ray, and DVD on August 16, 2016, by Sony Pictures Home Entertainment, with four "Hatchlings" shorts included. The film topped the home video sales chart for the week ending on August 21, 2016.

== Reception ==
=== Box office ===
The Angry Birds Movie grossed $107.5 million in the United States and Canada and $244.8 million in other territories for a worldwide total of $352.3 million. It peaked as the second highest-grossing film based on a video game worldwide, and the second highest-grossing domestically. In addition, it is the highest-grossing Finnish-produced film of all time. Deadline Hollywood calculated the net profit of the film to be $72 million.

In the United States and Canada, the film opened alongside Neighbors 2: Sorority Rising and The Nice Guys, and was projected to gross $35–40 million or as high as $45 million from 3,932 theaters in its opening weekend. The Angry Birds Movie was the top selling film for the weekend, and grossed $800,000 from Thursday night previews and $11 million on its opening day. In its opening weekend it grossed $38.2 million, finishing first at the box office and marked the third biggest Sony animated opening of all time, behind Hotel Transylvania (2012) and its sequel Hotel Transylvania 2 (2015). It also scored the second-best debut weekend ever for a video game adaptation, behind the $47 million debut of Lara Croft: Tomb Raider (2001). It dropped 51% in its second weekend, against X-Men: Apocalypse and Alice Through the Looking Glass, grossing $18.7 million.

Ryan Gosling, who starred in The Nice Guys, blames The Angry Birds Movie for the film's commercial failure and the lack of a sequel, telling Comicbook.com in 2024, "So much of a sequel, I think, is decided by the opening weekend of a movie, and we opened up against Angry Birds, [...] So Angry Birds just destroyed us." Deadline noted that it had the benefit of being the only animated film in theaters until Finding Dory on June 17.

=== Critical response ===
On the review aggregator website Rotten Tomatoes, 44% of 158 critics' reviews are positive, with an average rating of 5/10. The website's consensus reads: "The Angry Birds Movie is substantially more entertaining than any film adapted from an app has any right to be—which may or may not be much of an endorsement." Metacritic, which uses a weighted average, assigned the film a score of 43 out of 100, based on 27 critics, indicating "mixed or average" reviews. Audiences polled by CinemaScore gave the film an average grade of "B+" on an A+ to F scale.

Lindsey Bahr of the Associated Press gave the film a positive review by writing, "Ultimately, The Angry Birds Movie does a decent job exploring the merits of anger. It's no Inside Out, but it has heart and life, which isn't too shabby for any film—app or not." Guy Lodge of Variety called the film "a fast, fizzy and frenetically entertaining extension of the manic gaming franchise". Leslie Felperin from The Hollywood Reporter wrote that The Angry Birds Movie is "way better than most viewers would expect", adding, "in terms of storyboard-storytelling (a specialty of co-director Reilly) the quality of visual imagination is very high. Befitting of the nature of the original games, spatial relationships are exceedingly clear, and the intricate, Rube Goldberg-like structures the film's world builds up make sense mechanically right up to the moment they get blown to smithereens."

While Rafer Guzman of Newsday found the plot to be "pretty thin gruel", he thought the script was quite funny and that the animation was brightly colored and appealing. Tara Brady of The Irish Times gave the film a three out of five-star rating, stating that "animation veterans Fergal Reilly and Clay Kaytis ensure this Skittles-coloured universe is never less than zippy. But it's the cast that makes the movie". Peter Bradshaw from The Guardian wrote that The Angry Birds Movie is "driven by a naked commercial imperative", and that while it does not "match up to the hyperactive, clever surreality of The Lego Movie", he found "a kind of pleasure and fascination, mixed with exasperation" in how the video game was adapted.

Glenn Kenny of The New York Times gave The Angry Birds Movie a negative review, writing, "the kids of today deserve better. So do I, come to think of it." In his review for TheWrap, Alonso Duralde wrote, "Let's be clear, then: The Angry Birds Movie isn't pointless because it's based on an app. It's pointless because it's pointless." In a two out of five-star review, Radheyan Simonpillai of Now felt that the film "goes through familiar, harmless and occasionally amusing plot motions to explain why these birds are so angry, and why they're perfectly justified in going bin Laden on buildings".

=== Accolades ===
Award	Date	Category	Recipient(s)	Result	Ref.
Jussi Awards	March 24, 2017	Best Film	John Cohen, Catherine Winder, Mikael Hed, David Maisel	Nominated	
Hollywood Music in Media Awards	November 17, 2016	Best Original Score – Animated Film	Heitor Pereira	Nominated	
Kids' Choice Awards	March 11, 2017	Most Wanted Pet	Jason Sudeikis	Nominated	
Teen Choice Awards	July 31, 2016	Choice Movie: Hissy Fit	Jason Sudeikis	Nominated	
Teen Choice Awards	July 31, 2016	Choice Music: Song from a Movie or TV Show	"I Will Survive" by Demi Lovato	Nominated	

== Future ==
=== Legacy and follow-up media ===
Angry Birds Blues, a 2017 animated television series produced by Rovio and Canadian animation studio Bardel Entertainment, was teased in the film's credits. In the summer of 2017, GoComics announced that it would run a comic strip series based on The Angry Birds Movie and its characters, with each issue viewable on their website. The Angry Birds Movie has influenced several pieces of later Angry Birds media; the visual design of the game Angry Birds Evolution is based on the film, the Netflix animated series Angry Birds: Summer Madness borrows the film's humour and tone, and the 2021 Apple Arcade game Angry Birds Reloaded features characters from the Angry Birds films.

=== Sequels ===
By August 2016, Rovio had begun working on a sequel. The sequel, titled The Angry Birds Movie 2, was released in the United States on August 16, 2019, closely coinciding with the tenth anniversary of the original video game. It was directed by Thurop Van Orman and John Rice. Cohen returned as producer, with Peter Ackerman, Eyal Podell, and Jonathon E. Stewart as writers. Sudeikis, Gad, Hader, McBride, Dinklage, Rudolph, Hale, and Padilla returned to voice their roles, with Nicki Minaj, Rachel Bloom, Sterling K. Brown, Eugenio Derbez, Zach Woods, Awkwafina, Lil Rel Howery, Dove Cameron, Beck Bennett, Tiffany Haddish, Brooklynn Prince, and Leslie Jones joining the cast.

A second sequel, The Angry Birds Movie 3, is scheduled for release on December 23, 2026. Sudekis, Gad, McBride, Padilla, and Hecox reprise their roles from The Angry Birds Movie while Bloom reprises her role from the previous sequel. Directed by John Rice and written by Thurop Van Orman, The Angry Birds Movie 3 introduces Red's children, voiced by Walker Scobell, Emma Myers, and Psalm West.

== See also ==
- List of films based on video games
