= Car Jack Streets =

2008 video game

- Developer: Tag Games
- Publisher: Tag Games
- Platforms: Mobile phone, iOS (iPhone), Nintendo DS, PlayStation Portable
- Release: 23 October 2008: Mobile; EU: 23 October 2008 iOS 27 April 2009 DS; NA: 15 March 2010; EU: 19 March 2010 PSP; NA: 29 April 2010; EU: 14 July 2010 Directors Cut 19 December 2012
- Genre: Racing
- Mode: Single-player

Car Jack Streets is an action-adventure game developed and published by Tag Games for mobile phones in 2008, for iPhone in 2009, and for Nintendo DS and PlayStation Portable in 2010.

A Directors Cut edition was published by Tagplay in 2012.

== Reception ==
Reception

Aggregate scores
Aggregator	Score			
Aggregator	DS	iOS	mobile	PSP
GameRankings	73%	77% (D.C.) 60%	N/A	57%
Metacritic	71/100	60/100	N/A	80/100

Review scores
Publication	Score			
Publication	DS	iOS	mobile	PSP
Eurogamer	N/A	N/A	N/A	6/10
IGN	8/10	N/A	N/A	6/10
Nintendo Life	7/10	N/A	N/A	N/A
Official Nintendo Magazine	76%	N/A	N/A	N/A
PlayStation Official Magazine – UK	N/A	N/A	N/A	3/10
Pocket Gamer	3.5/5	3.5/5	4/5	N/A

The game received favourable to mixed reviews on all platforms.
