= Angry Birds Action! =

2016 mobile game

- An early app icon for the game
- Developers: Tag Games; Rovio Entertainment
- Publisher: Rovio Entertainment
- Series: Angry Birds
- Platforms: Android; iOS
- Release: April 28, 2016 – October 1, 2017 (1 year, 5 months and 3 days)
- Genre: Pinball
- Mode: Single player

Angry Birds Action! is a 2016 pinball video game developed by Tag Games and published by Rovio Entertainment. It is the thirteenth game in the Angry Birds series, and the first to have the birds appear as their counterparts in The Angry Birds Movie. It was soft launched in New Zealand on February 16, 2016 and was released for iOS and Android worldwide on April 28, 2016. It used the basic mechanics of pinball with the various Angry Birds acting as the pinball. It was free-to-play with optional purchases for in-game currency. In October 2017, the game was removed from the app stores.

== Gameplay ==
Screenshot of gameplay. The camera is normally positioned at a top-down perspective, but occasionally zooms up close as the game goes into slow motion whenever the player is close to delivering a critical blow.

Instead of using a slingshot like in the original Angry Birds, the birds dash through an area in a top down perspective and ricochet like pinballs. Most levels have pinball-style bumpers and sometimes there are hazards such as TNT crates, rocks, blocks of ice or strong winds. Each Angry Bird has a different ability, such as Bomb's ability to blast obstacles near him and Chuck's speed boost, which allows him to fly against powerful fans. Players have a limited number of birds to use for completing each level, and each bird has enough stamina to be launched up to three times, based on their starting or previous position. The game uses an energy system that, after completing a level or failing to finish a level a few times, either makes the player wait to continue playing or use in-game currency, called gems, to continue playing. Also, in contrast to the sizable variety of playable characters available in previous games, only four are playable in this title, which is Red, Bomb, Chuck or Terence, the four students in Matilda's anger management class in the film adaptation.

A player can use power-ups to have a better shot at beating a level, such as a beach ball that allows birds to travel farther with each bounce. Power-ups can be collected by either buying them with gems or winning them by opening wooden chests. Up to 3 chests can be opened after beating a level, depending on how many stars were earned on that level (although more chests can also be purchased with gems), and on occasion, an additional chest can be opened after a certain amount of coins are collected.

The game uses QR codes in the shape of Red's face called "BirdCodes", that can be found on Angry Birds toy packaging, on McDonald's food items, on Toys "R" Us displays, film posters and in other locations. The codes can add 30-second mini-games that add power-ups for use in the game or new content. A special feature, called "Movie Magic", which previously only worked by opening the app during the credits of The Angry Birds Movie that listens for an inaudible sound while in a cinema that unlocks the Piggy Island episode and it also shows an alternate ending for the film in which Chuck annoys Red. In July 2016, the Piggy Island episode was unlocked for all players.

== Reception ==
Reception

Aggregate score
Aggregator	Score
Metacritic	75/100

Pocket Gamer gave the game an 8/10, feeling that Angry Birds Action! was an entertaining mobile game even though it has an energy system that after a few games either makes the player wait to continue playing or use gems; overall considered it a solid game that will leave a smile on your face.
