= Angry Birds Reloaded =

2021 puzzle video game

- Original app icon
- Developer: Rovio Entertainment
- Publisher: Rovio Entertainment
- Series: Angry Birds
- Engine: Unity
- Platform: iOS
- Release: July 16, 2021
- Genres: Puzzle, casual
- Mode: Single-player

Angry Birds Reloaded is a 2021 puzzle video game developed by Finnish video game developer Rovio Entertainment and is the nineteenth game in the Angry Birds franchise. The game was released exclusively for the Apple Arcade subscription service on July 16, 2021. It is inspired by the classic Angry Birds slingshot games, with the addition of new graphics as well as characters and settings from previous Angry Birds media.

== Gameplay ==
The gameplay of Angry Birds Reloaded is identical to that of the oldest Angry Birds titles; the player aims and launches birds from a slingshot at pigs' fortresses until every pig in the level have been defeated. This must be achieved before the player runs out of birds to fire. However, unlike previous installments in the series, Angry Birds Reloaded includes an Eagle Island setting, where pigs are introduced as playable characters that can be fired from the slingshot, and eagles appear as enemies. Each playable character has an ability that is activated when tapping the screen as they are mid-flight.

Reloaded is divided into levels, which are subdivided into episodes. Initially, the game included seven episodes. Although the game includes power-ups, unlike in previous games, the game's release as part of mobile gaming subscription service Apple Arcade means that these power-ups are purchased with coins won in-game instead of with real-world money.

== Critical response ==
Angry Birds Reloaded has been praised by critics. An unnamed critic from Multiplayer.it gave a positive review, writing "Angry Birds Reloaded aims on the one hand to involve a new generation of gamers with its immediate and fun mechanics, on the other hand to pay homage to the historical fans of the series with an episode reinvented in many respects." Nathan Round, writing for Game Rant, stated "this particular entry captures the simple, classic feel of the earlier games, making it a must-play for both veteran and new players."
