= Angry Birds Friends =

2012 video game

- Developer: Rovio Entertainment
- Publisher: Rovio Entertainment
- Producers: Mikael Hed; Niklas Hed; Peter Versabacka
- Composer: Ari Pulkkinen
- Series: Angry Birds
- Engine: Unity
- Platforms: Android, iOS, Facebook (Adobe Flash), Microsoft Windows
- Release: February 13, 2012 (Facebook); May 2, 2013 (Android and iOS); August 9, 2019 (Microsoft Windows)
- Genre: Puzzle
- Modes: Single-player, multiplayer

Angry Birds Friends (formerly Angry Birds Facebook) is a live-service puzzle video game developed and published by Rovio Entertainment. The game was originally an exclusive Facebook game called Angry Birds Facebook that was released on February 13, 2012 as the fourth game in the Angry Birds series, and was renamed to the current name on May 23, 2012. The Facebook version introduced power-ups to the Angry Birds game series. Android and iOS versions were released on May 2, 2013. On October 27, 2014, Rovio introduced a global league to allow users from around the world to play against each other.

== Gameplay ==
The mobile version has six-level tournaments that change twice a week, but there are no episodes like other games or the now discontinued Facebook Flash version. Unlike the previous Angry Birds games, this game syncs progress with the Facebook version's weekly tournaments between the player, placeholder scores represented by Red and Chuck, and any of the player's Facebook friends who also play the game. The game requires a login to Facebook to sync progress; otherwise one can play without a Facebook account. Tournament players each week earn in-game currency, called Bird Coins, which can be used to purchase power-ups or to acquire additional bird slingshots. In addition, the game includes four power-up practice levels where there are infinite power-ups available for use.

In August 2012, Rovio announced a partnership with the punk band Green Day, which led to 20 new levels of Angry Birds Friends on Facebook featuring all three members of the band. The new levels showcased each member of Green Day as a green, bad pig and also featured Green Day's latest single, and an exclusive track. The levels were removed in December 2012.

== Reception ==
Reception

Aggregate score
Aggregator	Score
Metacritic	65/100

The game has received mixed reviews with a Metacritic score of 65/100 based on 5 reviews. Pocket Gamer criticized the game for being "shallow and uninspiring"

In April 2013, Rovio revealed that the Facebook game had been installed by over 60 million users, with 1.2 million daily active users and 10 million monthly active users.
