= Rovio Entertainment =

Finnish video game developer

Rovio Entertainment Ltd.
- Logo used since 2016

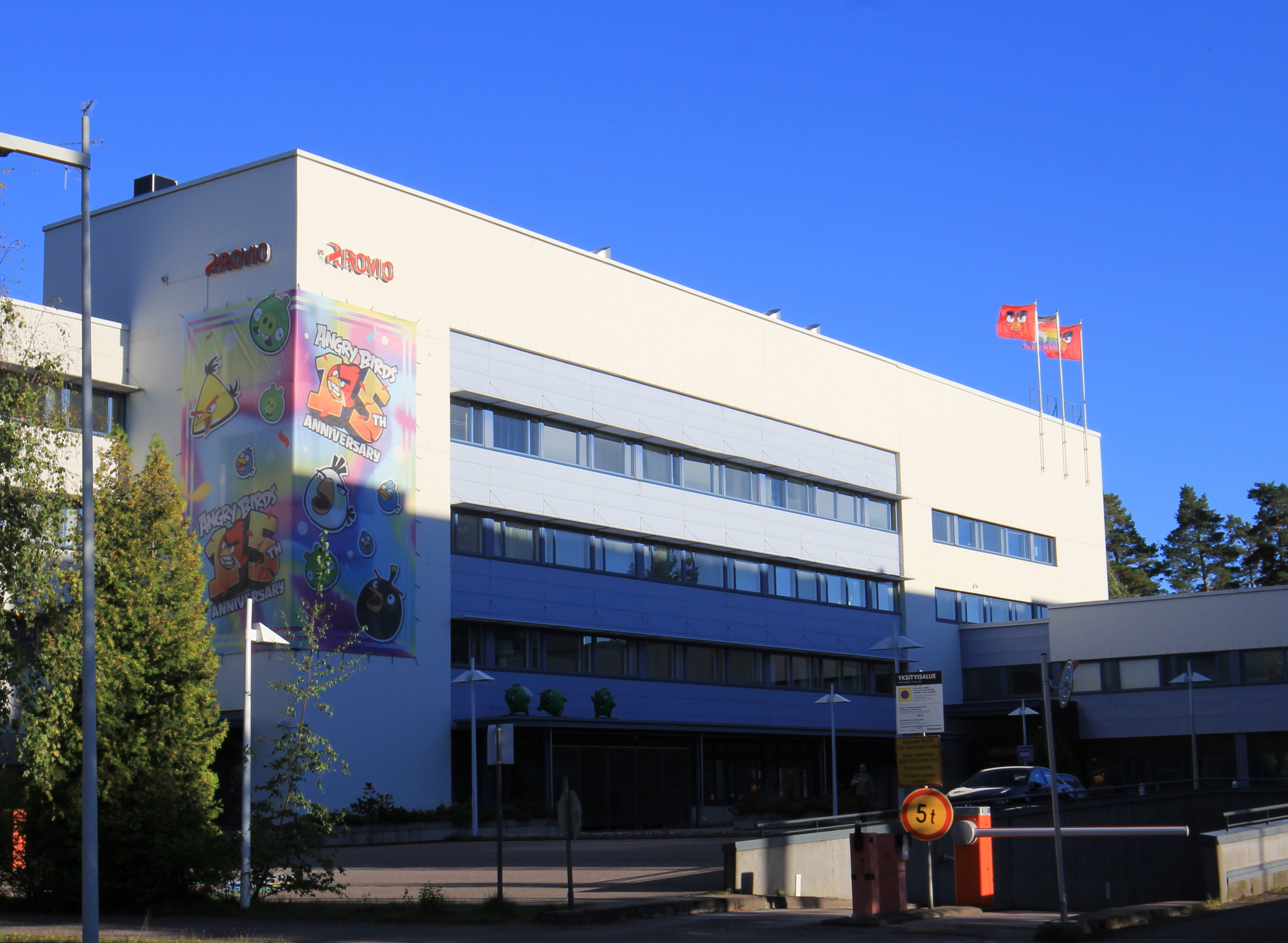
- Rovio's headquarters in Espoo (since 2016), Finland
- Trade name: Rovio
- Native name: Rovio Entertainment Oy
- Formerly: Relude Oy (2003–2005); Rovio Mobile Oy (2005–2011); Rovio Entertainment Oy (2011–2017); Rovio Entertainment Oyj (2017–2024)
- Type: Subsidiary
- Traded as: Nasdaq Helsinki: ROVIO
- Industry: Video games
- Founded: 8 January 2003; 23 years ago in Helsinki, Finland
- Founders: Niklas Hed; Jarno Väkeväinen; Kim Dikert
- Headquarters: Espoo, Finland
- Number of locations: 8 studios (2022)
- Area served: Worldwide
- Key people: Alexandre Pelletier-Normand (CEO); Teemu Tertsunen (CFO); Heini Kaihu (CSO)
- Products: Angry Birds series
- Revenue: ▲€317.7 million (2022)
- Operating income: ▼€28.6 million (2022)
- Net income: ▼€22.9 million (2022)
- Number of employees: ▲513 (2022)
- Parent: Sega (2023–present)
- Subsidiaries: Ruby Games; Kombo (former, 2010-2011); Dark Matter Gaming; Rovio Animation (2012–2017); Bad Piggy Records; Rovio Books; Rovio Stars
- Website: rovio.com

Rovio Entertainment Oy (formerly Relude Oy and Rovio Mobile Oy) is a Finnish, Japanese-owned video game developer based in Espoo. Founded in 2003 by Helsinki University of Technology students Niklas Hed, Jarno Väkeväinen and Kim Dikert, the company is best known for the Angry Birds franchise. The company currently operates studios in Barcelona, Toronto, Espoo, and Stockholm, with former offices in Tampere, London, Montreal, and Copenhagen. The company's success has helped to establish Finland as a leading player in the mobile game industry and has helped to create a thriving ecosystem for game development in the country. In August 2023, Sega purchased Rovio for US$776 million and it was made a subsidiary of the Sega Europe division.

== History ==
=== 2003–2009: early years ===
In 2003, three students from the Helsinki University of Technology, Niklas Hed, Jarno Väkeväinen and Kim Dikert, participated in a mobile game development competition at the Assembly demo party sponsored by Nokia and Hewlett-Packard. A victory with a mobile game called King of the Cabbage World led the trio to set up their own company, Relude. King of the Cabbage World was sold to Sumea, and renamed to Mole War, which became one of the first commercial real-time multiplayer mobile games. In January 2005, Relude received its first round of investment from a business angel, and the company changed its name to Rovio Mobile, where "rovio" translates from Finnish as "pyre".

In 2009, the board gave Mikael Hed the job of CEO. In December 2009, Rovio released Angry Birds, its 52nd game, a puzzle game where a bird is flung at pigs using a slingshot for the iPhone; it reached the No. 1 spot in the Apple App Store paid apps chart after six months, and remained charted for months after.

=== 2010–2014: international success ===
In March 2011, Rovio raised $42 million in venture capital funding from Accel Partners, Atomico and Felicis Ventures. In July 2011, the company changed its name to Rovio Entertainment. In June 2011, the company hired David Maisel to lead its Angry Birds movie production. By October 2011, Rovio purchased Kombo, a Helsinki-based animation company. The animation studio was acquired to produce a series of short videos released in 2012. In March 2012, Rovio acquired Futuremark Game Studios, the game development division of benchmarking company Futuremark, for an undisclosed sum.

In May 2012, Rovio announced that its game series Angry Birds had reached its one billionth download. In July 2012, Rovio announced a distribution partnership with Activision to bring the first three Angry Birds titles to video game consoles and handhelds, in a collection named Angry Birds Trilogy. It was released in September 2012. In November 2012, Rovio released Angry Birds Star Wars, an iteration of its popular game licensed from the Star Wars original trilogy, for mobile devices and PC. Rovio partnered with Activision again to port the title to video game consoles and handhelds, with it being released on those platforms in October 2013. A sequel, Angry Birds Star Wars II, based on the Star Wars prequel trilogy, was released in September 2013.

In March 2013, Rovio launched its multi-platform Toons.TV channel starting with Angry Birds Toons. As of 2013, Rovio became a video game publisher and is publishing third party games through its Rovio Stars program. The channel was discontinued in 2017.

In January 2014, Rovio announced that its game series Angry Birds had reached its two billionth download. In addition, it was revealed that its flagship series, Angry Birds, "leaked data" to third-party companies, possibly to surveillance agencies like the NSA. In retaliation, anti-NSA hackers defaced Rovio's website.

In May 2014, Rovio launched a new publishing arm, Rovio LVL11, to release experimental games. The first game published under Rovio LVL11 is Retry and the second is Selfie Slam. As of June 2014, Rovio considers themselves an entertainment company, not just a game company. This is reinforced by Rovio's merchandise and licensing business accounting for about half of its annual revenue of $216 million in 2013.

=== 2014–present: decline, initial public offering and acquisition by Sega ===
In August 2014, Rovio announced that Mikael Hed would step down as CEO in January 2015 in favour of Pekka Rantala. Hed remained on Rovio's board and became the chairman of Rovio Animation. In December 2014, Rovio laid off 110 employees after net profits halved in 2013 due to its recent games, Angry Birds Epic and Angry Birds Go!, which were not as successful as past games. After this move, Rovio closed its Tampere studio, moving its operations to its Espoo location. At the end of 2014, Rovio suffered from a 73% decrease in profit, earning only €10 million. Pekka Rantala stated that the decrease is due to the poor sales of the licensed merchandise and the by-products of Angry Birds. He also noted that "the company are unsatisfied over the result of our licensing business". In August 2015, Rovio laid off 260 employees worldwide after Angry Birds toy and merchandise revenue fell by 43% during 2014. In December 2015, Rantala announced that he would step down as the CEO and would be succeeded by Kati Levoranta, former chief legal officer of Rovio, in January 2016.

On 16 January 2017, Rovio opened its new game studio in London to focus on massively multiplayer online games. On 15 February, Rovio announced that it will be cutting at least 35 jobs as it restructures the animation division. In March, Kaiken Entertainment, founded by former Rovio CEO Mikael Hed, acquired Rovio's animation division. Later that month Rovio reported that it has returned to profitability with a gross revenue of US$201 million with the success of The Angry Birds Movie and its recent video games. In June, Kaj Hed resigned as chairman of Rovio and Mika Ihamuotila succeeded him as new chairman. On 5 September, Rovio announced its intention to become a publicly traded company. In October, Rovio shares were sold at NASDAQ Helsinki and the company was valued at $1 billion.

On 2 March 2018, Rovio announced the closure of its London studio after disappointing results. Later on 14 November, Rovio announced that it appointed the former Gameloft executive Alexandre Pelletier-Normand as executive vice president of its game business unit. He started his role on 2 January 2019. On 30 November 2018, Rovio announced that it had fully acquired PlayRaven, the developer known for making strategy games such as Eve: War of Ascension.

On 3 June 2020, Rovio acquired Darkfire Games for an undisclosed sum. The subsidiary became Rovio Copenhagen. On 21 December Rovio announced that Executive Vice President of games, Alexandre Pelletier-Normand, would take over as CEO. The change went into effect on 1 January 2021. In 2021, the New Mexico attorney general filed a federal lawsuit against Rovio, alleging the company illegally collected and sold private personal data of users under thirteen to third party advertisers. The same year, Rovio acquired Turkish casual game developer Ruby Games.

On 15 April 2023, IGN reported that Sega would be acquiring Rovio, with a deal close to $1 billion. Rovio had rejected an earlier acquisition bid from Israeli mobile company Playtika for $800 million. Two days later Sega Sammy Holdings announced that they have made a €706 million ($776 million USD) tender offer to bid for Rovio, which closed on 17 August. On 7 December, Rovio closed down the Montreal based division Studio Lumi leading to the loss of 16 jobs. On 8 January 2026, Rovio announced that it has merged its Angry Birds licensing team into Sega's global character licensing business. By February 2026, Sega announced it would record a $200 million impairment write-down for Rovio during Q3 due to its inability to fully implement Rovio's Beacon technology in its own mobile titles. In September 2026, Rovio closed its Copenhagen division following the cancellation of development of the Sonic the Hedgehog mobile game Sonic Blitz, which had been soft launched in Brazil and the Philippines.

== Games developed ==
=== Pre-Angry Birds ===
Prior to creating Angry Birds, Rovio developed 51 games, a combination of work-for-hire projects, publishing contracts and independently released titles.

- Bounce Boing Voyage – N-Gage (2008)
- Bounce Evolution – Nokia N900 (2009)
- Bounce Tales – Java ME (2008)
- Bounce Touch – Symbian^1 (2008)
- Burger Rush – Java ME (2008)
- Burnout – Java ME (2007)
- Collapse Chaos – Java ME (2008)
- Cyber Blood – Java ME (2006)
- Darkest Fear – Java ME (2005), iOS (2009)
- Darkest Fear 2: Grim Oak – Java ME (2006)
- Darkest Fear 3: Nightmare – Java ME (2006)
- Desert Sniper – Java ME (2006)
- Dragon & Jade – Java ME (2007)
- Formula GP Racing – Java ME (2005)
- Gem Drop Deluxe – Java ME (2008)
- Marine Sniper – Java ME (2007)
- Mole War – Java ME (2004)
- Need for Speed: Carbon – Java ME (2006)
- Paid to Kill – Java ME (2004)
- Paper Planes – Java ME (2008)
- Patron Angel – Java ME (2007)
- Playman Winter Games – Java ME (2005)
- Shopping Madness – Java ME (2007)
- Space Impact: Meteor Shield – Nokia N97 (2010)
- Star Marine – Java ME (2007)
- Sumea Ski Jump – Java ME (2007)
- SWAT Elite Troops – Java ME (2008)
- Totomi – iOS, Flash, Java ME (2008)
- US Marine Corps Scout Sniper – Java ME (2006)
- War Diary: Burma – Java ME (2005)
- War Diary: Crusader – Java ME (2005)
- War Diary: Torpedo – Java ME (2005)
- Wolf Moon – Java ME (2006)
- X Factor 2008 – Java ME (2008)

=== 2009–present ===
| Year | Title | Platform(s) | | | | Ref. |
| Year | Title | Android | iOS | PC | WP | Ref. |
|---|---|---|---|---|---|---|
| 2009 | Angry Birds | Yes | Yes | Yes | Yes | |
| 2010 | Angry Birds Seasons | Yes | Yes | Yes | Yes | |
| 2011 | Angry Birds Rio | Yes | Yes | Yes | Yes | |
| 2012 | Angry Birds Space | Yes | Yes | Yes | Yes | |
| 2012 | Amazing Alex | Yes | Yes | No | Yes | |
| 2012 | Bad Piggies | Yes | Yes | Yes | Yes | |
| 2012 | Angry Birds Star Wars | Yes | Yes | Yes | Yes | |
| 2013 | The Croods | Yes | Yes | No | No | |
| 2013 | Angry Birds Friends | Yes | Yes | Yes | No | |
| 2013 | Angry Birds Star Wars II | Yes | Yes | Yes | Yes | |
| 2013 | Angry Birds Go! | Yes | Yes | No | Yes | |
| 2014 | Angry Birds Epic | Yes | Yes | No | Yes | |
| 2014 | Angry Birds Stella | Yes | Yes | No | Yes | |
| 2014 | Angry Birds Transformers | Yes | Yes | No | No | |
| 2014 | Selfie Slam | No | Yes | No | No | |
| 2014 | Retry | Yes | Yes | No | No | |
| 2015 | Angry Birds POP! | Yes | Yes | No | No | |
| 2015 | Angry Birds 2 | Yes | Yes | Yes | No | |
| 2015 | Nibblers | Yes | Yes | No | No | |
| 2015 | Love Rocks Starring Shakira | Yes | Yes | No | No | |
| 2015 | Angry Birds Fight! | Yes | Yes | No | No | |
| 2016 | Angry Birds Action! | Yes | Yes | No | No | |
| 2016 | Angry Birds Blast! | Yes | Yes | No | No | |
| 2017 | Battle Bay | Yes | Yes | No | No | |
| 2017 | Angry Birds Evolution | Yes | Yes | No | No | |
| 2017 | Angry Birds Match | Yes | Yes | No | No | |
| 2017 | Angry Birds Champions | No | Yes | No | No | |
| 2017 | Angry Birds for Messenger | Yes | Yes | No | No | |
| 2019 | Angry Birds Dream Blast | Yes | Yes | No | No | |
| 2019 | Angry Birds VR/AR: Isle of Pigs | Yes | Yes | Yes | No | |
| 2019 | Angry Birds POP Blast | Yes | Yes | No | No | |
| 2019 | Angry Birds Explore | Yes | Yes | No | No | |
| 2019 | The Angry Birds Movie 2 VR: Under Pressure | No | No | No | No | |
| 2019 | Sugar Blast | Yes | Yes | No | No | |
| 2020 | Small Town Murders | Yes | Yes | No | No | |
| 2021 | Angry Birds Reloaded | No | Yes | No | No | |
| 2021 | Angry Birds: Bird Island | Yes | Yes | Yes | No | |
| 2022 | Angry Birds Journey | Yes | Yes | No | No | |
| 2022 | Rovio Classics: Angry Birds | Yes | Yes | No | No | |
| 2023 | Angry Birds Kingdom | Yes | No | No | No | |
| 2023 | Bad Piggies 2 | Yes | Yes | No | No | |
| 2024 | Angry Birds Block Quest | Yes | No | No | No | |
| 2025 | Sonic Blitz | Yes | Yes | No | No | |
| 2025 | Angry Birds Bounce | No | Yes | No | No | |

== Television series ==
- Angry Birds Toons (2013–2016)
- Piggy Tales (2014–2019)
- Angry Birds Stella (2014–2016)
- Angry Birds Blues (2017)
- Angry Birds BirLd Cup (2018)
- Angry Birds Zero Gravity (2018)
- Angry Birds on the Run (2018–2020)
- Angry Birds MakerSpace (2019–2025)
- Angry Birds Slingshot Stories (2020–2026)
- Angry Birds Bubble Trouble (2020–2023)
- Angry Birds: Summer Madness (2022)
- Angry Birds Mystery Island (2024)
