= Soft launch =

Preview release of a product

A soft launch, also known as a soft opening, is a preview release of a product or service to a limited audience prior to the general public. Soft-launching a product is sometimes used to gather data or customer feedback, prior to making it widely available during an official release or grand opening. A company may also choose a soft launch to test the functionality of a product, allowing adjustments to be made before a wider release and marketing efforts are implemented.

== Computer-related ==
When implementing a soft launch strategy, a company releases a product with little or no marketing. A soft launch permits a company to react to most customer demands quickly and effectively, introducing new features which will ultimately make the product successful. For companies with a limited budget, a soft launch can allow them to focus on product development rather than marketing.

=== Websites ===
Soft launches can take multiple forms depending on the product strategy. A popular approach is a Beta Launch, where a limited group of users is invited to test upcoming features and provide feedback. Platforms like Product Hunt are frequently used to gather early traction and real-user opinions during this phase. Another method is an MVP (Minimum Viable Product) Launch, where a simplified version of the product is released to validate market demand often shared with early adopters through communities like Hacker News. Across all soft-launch strategies, clear communication is key to building anticipation. A simple and effective way to create hype is with countdown timers on websites, landing pages, or emails. Embeddable timers signal that something new is coming, and boost engagement during the soft launch phase. Tools like CountdownShare let users quickly create and embed customizable countdowns for beta launches, MVP releases, early-access events, and more. By combining multiple soft-launch strategies beta testing, MVP releases, early-access roll outs, and clear communication, users create a more reliable path to engagement, feedback, and a stronger final launch.

=== Hardware ===
In the instance of hardware products, a limited release soft launch can be used to test the market prior to a wide scale release. It also means companies are allowed to make last minute changes to the product after the soft launch. In many instances, soft launches of hardware are done in major metropolitan areas where the company has access to a wide variety of demographic groups.

=== Software ===
Soft launches are also used for software, with a small release being made to a limited group of individuals for beta testing. Software can be extensively tested by the releasing company, but ultimately, it needs to be used to determine how effective it is. Major flaws in the design may emerge during beta testing and can be corrected before the product is released into a major market.

Some software is soft launched on the Internet, which allows for easy software updates. Early beta testers can grow attached to the program and will continue to download new versions as they are released. Thus, companies often build up loyal customer bases, spreading the word to other potential customers.

=== Mobile apps ===
Soft launches are popular for free-to-play mobile games.

Before committing to a hard launch in the United States or any other country, developers creating English mobile applications may choose to launch unofficially in less populous English-speaking countries in order to refine it before launch by analyzing usage and spending habits, which are thought to be similar to those in the United States. This may also reduce the chances of the American press noticing the app. While predominantly English-speaking countries like Canada, Australia, and New Zealand are common choices, games are also tested in countries like the Philippines, which has connections to Asia, Sweden, which can provide an on-ramp into the European market, and many other countries including Brazil, South Africa, and Indonesia. Canada, in particular, also has the advantage of having similar time zones to the United States.

== Soft launch vs. hard launch ==
A soft launch differs significantly from a hard launch (also known as a "grand opening" or "full launch") in several key aspects. While a soft launch targets a limited, select audience, a hard launch aims for the general public with a wide release. Soft launches typically involve minimal or no marketing, whereas hard launches are accompanied by extensive marketing campaigns.

The duration of these launch strategies also varies. Soft launches extend over a period, allowing for testing and refinement, while hard launches are often centered around a single event or short-term push. The primary purpose of a soft launch is to gather feedback, test functionality, and make adjustments. In contrast, a hard launch focuses on official release and maximizing impact and awareness.

Visibility is another distinguishing factor. Soft launches are typically low-key and often fly under the radar, while hard launches are high-profile events seeking attention. Soft launches offer high flexibility, allowing for changes based on feedback, whereas hard launches present the product or service as final with little room for major adjustments.

Resource investment often differs between the two approaches. Soft launches generally require lower initial investment, while hard launches often demand significant upfront resources. This correlates with the level of risk: soft launches carry lower risk as issues can be addressed before full release, but hard launches involve higher risk due to less room for major adjustments post-launch.

Businesses may choose to use a soft launch, hard launch, or a combination of both strategies depending on factors such as product readiness, market conditions, available resources, risk tolerance, brand strategy, and the nature of the product or service. While soft launches allow for more flexibility and risk mitigation, hard launches can create more immediate impact and awareness. The choice between the two approaches often depends on the specific goals and circumstances of the release.

== Brick-and-mortar establishments ==
When a brick and mortar business wishes to open prior to its grand opening (to test its capacity and train its staff), this may be referred to as a soft launch or "soft opening".

The term test event is often used in sports, especially in the UK, to refer to events held in a newly constructed sports venue before its official opening. For example, a newly built venue in the UK is required to host two events at reduced capacity, with the second event using a larger capacity than the first, before being granted a safety certificate that allows it to hold events at full capacity.

== On social media ==
The term "soft launch" has been used by social media influencers to hint at the existence of a significant other without making a formal announcement, as a subtler alternative to a "boyfriend reveal". Examples can include posting pictures of food or drink for two or a selfie in an unfamiliar location.
