= Angry Birds Rio =

2011 video game

- App icon
- Developer: Rovio Entertainment
- Publisher: Rovio Entertainment
- Producers: Peter Vesterbacka; Niklas Hed; Mikael Hed; Petri Jarvilёnto
- Series: Angry Birds
- Engine: Box2D
- Platforms: iOS, Android, OS X, Windows, Symbian OS, webOS, BlackBerry Tablet OS, Windows Phone
- Release: March 22, 2011
- Genre: Puzzle
- Mode: Single-player

Angry Birds Rio is a 2011 puzzle video game developed and published by Rovio Entertainment. It is a crossover between the Angry Birds and the Rio franchises. The game was released on March 22, 2011, and promoted as a tie-in with 20th Century Fox and Blue Sky Studios, that co-produced the animated films Rio (2011) and Rio 2 (2014). While utilizing the same basic gameplay as in Angry Birds (2009), Angry Birds Rio added a number of new elements, most notably the first use of boss levels. Angry Birds Rio was discontinued on February 3, 2020 along with Angry Birds Star Wars (2012), and its sequel Angry Birds Star Wars II (2013), with the games also being delisted from Google Play and the iOS App Store.

== Gameplay ==
In Angry Birds Rio, the main protagonists. Red, the Blues and Chuck have been kidnapped and taken to Rio de Janeiro by the Smugglers under the orders of an evil cockatoo named Nigel, the main antagonist from the film. Just as in the original Angry Birds, players use a slingshot to launch the birds at nearby structures, with the intent of hitting targets located on or within them. Instead of the pigs that have stolen eggs, players must now rescue caged exotic birds or defeat Nigel's marmosets, depending on the level being played. Because of the game's setting, several characters from Rio make appearances. Blu and Jewel are both featured as types of bird exclusive to this game, along with all the existing birds from the series.

The game also includes the first boss fights to appear in the series, in which the player uses the birds to defeat Nigel, as well as Mauro, the leader of the marmosets. In other levels, Luiz helps defeat the marmosets and destroys materials and blocks to get the player extra points, as well as hidden items to collect as the player progresses through the game.

== Plot ==
The plot of Angry Birds Rio is essentially the same as that of the film Rio, albeit with the Angry Birds being present and the story being from their point of view.

Red, Chuck, and the Blues are looking after their nest of eggs when they are captured by a helicopter and transported to Rio de Janeiro. They land in a smugglers' den, where several other rare species of kidnapped birds are being kept. Nigel shows how they are an "exceptionally rare species", which makes them worth a large sum of money. Enraged, the Angry Birds break free from their cage and begin freeing the other birds. Upon freeing Blu and Jewel, the protagonists of the film, Blu states that he cannot fly. Since Blu and Jewel are chained together, the flock decides to escape into the forest. Later on, Nigel hires a group of marmosets to track them down and bring them back. The marmosets are unsuccessful however, as the birds overpower them. Nigel attempts to take on the birds himself, but ultimately fails.

The flock encounters Rafael, who takes them to his friend Luiz to remove the chains off Blu and Jewel. While celebrating being unchained, Jewel is captured by Nigel. Red, the Blues, Chuck, Blu and the rest of the Angry Birds manage to track them down to the parade. There, they defeat Mauro, the leader of the marmosets, and Blu finds Jewel inside one of the fake parade floats. However, Nigel finds Blu attempting to break free Jewel and kidnaps him too, prompting the Angry Birds to chase after the parade float to rescue them. The smugglers' plane containing Blu, Jewel and the other poached birds takes off with the Angry Birds hiding away inside. They free Blu, Jewel and the other captured birds and send Nigel into the plane's propellers, causing it to fall. Using the malfunctioning plane, the Angry Birds pilot the plane and crash-land back on their homeland, reuniting with their eggs and saving them from some thieving pigs in the process.

== Release ==
Angry Birds Rio initially included two chapters, "Smugglers' Den" and "Jungle Escape", each with 30 levels. Since then, the game has been expanded with three additional 30-level chapters called "Beach Volley" (released in May 2011), "Carnival Upheaval" (released in June 2011), and "Airfield Chase" (released in August 2011) along with a 15-level chapter, "Golden Beachball", which is unlocked by finding a hidden item in "Beach Volley" (iOS, Android) or by entering a redeem code from Rio DVD (PC, Mac). A final chapter named "Smugglers' Plane" (released in November 2011) was released with initially with 15 levels, with the final 15 levels released later (January 2012). Each chapter has a special fruit that may be rarely found as gold. "Smugglers' Den" has pineapples, "Jungle Escape" has bananas, "Beach Volley" has watermelons, "Carnival Upheaval" has papayas, "Airfield Chase" has apples, "Smugglers' Plane" has mangoes, "Market Mayhem" has strawberries, and "Rocket Rumble" has golden rockets. In July 2013, the "Golden Beachball" episode received 15 more levels, golden cherries, a new background, and this episode is now available from the start of the game.

In March 2012, the Trophy Room update was released, with 12 new levels that are each unlocked when a player finishes a chapter or collects all 15 of a certain golden fruit. This update was first released in the Android (Amazon Appstore ad-free) version before making its way to iOS. On December 18, 2012, a new update landed for iOS and Android adding 24 new levels. This levels are earned by getting from 30 to 70 stars on each episode or by earning 10 Mighty Eagles' Feathers on each episode (4 extra levels on each episode). This episode also added Power-Ups. The Power-Ups were Super Seeds and Sling Scope from the original Angry Birds and 2 new power-ups, Samba Burst and TNT Drop. On March 11, 2013, another update was released, adding a "Market Mayhem" episode with 34 levels (3 stars levels and 1 Mighty Eagle level). On July 25, 2013, Angry Birds Rio's app icon was updated and Golden Beachball added a golden fruit and 15 new levels. In addition, The trophy room levels were combined into the episode they were earned from.

Four Angry Birds Rio episodes — all visually tied to Rio 2 — were released from December 2013 to July 2014 and these episodes featured refreshed graphics. The Timber Tumble episode adds a hint feature that tells where to sling the bird. In the July 2015, a game update added bird coins that allow players to unlock levels that were previously locked.

=== Ports and inclusion in Angry Birds Trilogy ===
At the 2012 Electronic Entertainment Expo in Los Angeles, California, Rovio and distribution partner Activision announced plans to bring Angry Birds Rio and two other games, the original Angry Birds and Angry Birds Seasons (2010) to the PlayStation 3, Xbox 360 and Nintendo 3DS. Bundled together as Angry Birds Trilogy, the games were built specifically for their respective consoles, taking advantage of their unique features, such as support for PlayStation Move, Kinect, high-definition displays, and glasses-free 3D visuals. Angry Birds Trilogy was later released for the Nintendo Wii, Wii U and PlayStation Vita.

=== Discontinuation ===
On February 3, 2020, Angry Birds Rio, along with Angry Birds Star Wars (2012) and Angry Birds Star Wars II, were officially delisted from app stores, along with all in-game purchases and adverts no longer being available. In a 2021 interview, Rovio employee Steve Porter stated that the Rio and Star Wars games were unlikely to be rereleased due to third-party licensing.

== Reception ==
Reception

Aggregate score
Aggregator	Score
Metacritic	iOS: 87/100 iOS (HD): 88/100

Review scores
Publication	Score
IGN	8.5/10
TouchArcade	iOS: 5/5

Angry Birds Rio has received generally favorable reviews, with a Metacritic score of 87/100 based on 18 reviews. Ryan Rigney of GamePro stated that the iOS version "boasts some notable improvements on its predecessors" Levi Buchanan of IGN, in his review of the Android version, called the game "a smart, snappy new chapter for the series". Jim Squires of Gamezebo complimented the game's attempts to add new material and mechanics, saying "some evolution needs to happen if it wants to have the long term staying power of a Mario or a Pac-Man." However, Squires did take issue with the new boss battles, calling them "a little anti-climactic". Tracy Erickson of Pocket Gamer noted that "what Angry Birds Rio lacks in new ideas and freshness, it makes up in quality gameplay and good value".

=== Sales ===
In 2011, Angry Birds Rio had been downloaded more than 10 million times and had been one of the top downloaded games in 2012 at the Apple App Store, Google Play Store and again at the Google Play Store in 2014.

== See also ==
- List of most downloaded Android applications
