= Exient =

British video game developer

Exient Limited
- Type: Private
- Industry: Video games
- Founded: 2000 (26 years ago)
- Headquarters: Kings Langley, England, UK
- Website: Official website

Exient Limited is a British video game developer and publisher based in Kings Langley, England. Developing for handheld, mobile, console, VR and PC platforms, Having studios in the United Kingdom and Malta, Exient grew a name for designing and developing popular series' games to portable systems. It is known for its ports and adaptations of various games in the Madden NFL, FIFA, Need for Speed, and Tiger Woods PGA Tour series for Electronic Arts and for developing numerous titles in the Angry Birds series. The company was incorporated in 2000 and began operations in January 2001.

== History ==
Exient was founded by Charles Chapman and David Hawkins in 2001. Chapman began developing computer games at age 14 and graduated with a mathematics and computation degree from Keble College, Oxford. Hawkins worked with software engineering in automotive and switched to project management in games. They met when Hawkins, working for Atari, was looking for ideas for games and Chapman, impressed by Hawkins works, decided to found a development company.

Up to 2013, the bulk of their development was for gaming platforms such as PSP, Nintendo DS, and Game Boy Advance but since 2014 their games have been developed for platforms including Android, iOS, PC and Console. Exient currently develops its games on a proprietary, in-house developed, engine named XGS, the Unity and Unreal Engine platforms.

In 2020, the company rebranded its publishing labels, Sad Puppy and Donut, to Exient Publishing. In July 2022, an anonymous source told MCV/Develop that Exient was restructuring resulting in redundancies. In August 2022, Exient produced a two hour long documentary titled "Lemmings: Can you dig it" on the history of the Lemmings series, featuring the original developers, alumni of DMA Design. The documentary was premiered at the Dundee Centre of Contemporary Arts (DCA) and released free to watch on YouTube.

== Games developed ==
Release	Game	Format	Publisher	Ref
2024	The Grinch: Christmas Adventures	iOS, Android	Outright Games	
2024	Angry Birds Fury Road	Arcade Motion Platform	DOF Robotics	
2024	Parlini Land	iOS, Android	Magic Games Factory	
2024	Nina u Ninu	iOS, Android	Magic Games Factory	
2023	Ultimate Sackboy	iOS, Android	Exient Publishing	
2023	CoComelon: Play with JJ	iOS, Android	Netflix, Inc.	
2019	Lemmings	iOS, Android	Exient Publishing	
2017	Top Gear: Donut Dash	iOS, Android	BBC Worldwide	
2016	Dancing with the Stars	iOS, Android	Donut Publishing	
2016	Furby Connect World	iOS, Android	Hasbro	
2016	Strictly come Dancing	iOS, Android	Donut Publishing	
2016	F1 2016	iOS, Android	Codemasters	
2014	Angry Birds Transformers	iOS, Android	Rovio	
2014	Bake Escape	iOS	Donut Publishing	
2013	Angry Birds Go!	Android, iOS, Blackberry 10	Rovio	
2013	Diggs Nightcrawler	PlayStation 3		
2013	Angry Birds Trilogy	PlayStation Vita	Rovio	
2013	Angry Birds Star Wars	PlayStation 3, PlayStation 4, PlayStation Vita, Xbox 360, Xbox One, Wii, Wii U, Nintendo 3DS	Activision	
2013	CSR Racing	Android	NaturalMotion	
2012	Angry Birds Trilogy	Nintendo 3DS		
2012	Fireworks	PlayStation Vita		
2012	Pulzar	PlayStation Vita		
2010	Need for Speed: Hot Pursuit	Wii	Electronic Arts	
2010	The Sims 3	Nintendo DS	Electronic Arts	
2010	FIFA 11	Nintendo DS	Electronic Arts	
2010	X2 Football 2010	iOS	X2 Games	
2010	X2 Snowboarding	iOS	X2 Games	
2009	FIFA 10	Nintendo DS	Electronic Arts	
2009	DJ Hero	Wii, PlayStation 2	Electronic Arts	
2009	Tiger Woods PGA Tour	iOS	Electronic Arts	
2009	X2 Football 2009	iOS	Electronic Arts	
2008	FIFA 09	Nintendo DS	Electronic Arts	
2008	Madden NFL 09	Nintendo DS	Electronic Arts	
2008	Tiger Woods PGA Tour 09	PS, PSP2	Electronic Arts	
2008	Skate It	Nintendo DS		
2008	Need for Speed: Undercover	Wii, PlayStation 2		
2008	FIFA Street 3	Nintendo DS	Electronic Arts	
2007	NASCAR 08	PlayStation 2	Electronic Arts	
2007	FIFA 08	Nintendo DS	Electronic Arts	
2007	Madden NFL 08	Nintendo DS	Electronic Arts	
2007	Tiger Woods PGA Tour 08	Nintendo DS	Electronic Arts	
2007	Need for Speed: ProStreet	Nintendo DS	Electronic Arts	
2006	FIFA Street 2	Nintendo DS	Electronic Arts	
2006	2006 FIFA World Cup	Game Boy Advance, Nintendo DS, PlayStation Portable		
2006	Madden NFL 07	Game Boy Advance, Nintendo DS		
2006	FIFA 07	Game Boy Advance, Nintendo DS		
2006	NASCAR 07	PlayStation Portable	Electronic Arts	
2006	Need for Speed: Carbon – Own the City	Nintendo DS	Electronic Arts	
2005	FIFA Football 2005	Gizmondo	Electronic Arts	
2005	SSX 3	Gizmondo	Electronic Arts	
2005	Madden NFL 06	Game Boy Advance, Nintendo DS	Electronic Arts	
2005	FIFA 06	Game Boy Advance, Nintendo DS	Electronic Arts	
2004	Madden NFL 2005	Game Boy Advance, Nintendo DS	Electronic Arts	
2004	FIFA Soccer 2005	Game Boy Advance, N-Gage	Electronic Arts	
2004	SSX Out Of Bounds	N-Gage		
2004	WWE Aftershock	N-Gage	THQ Wireless	
2003	Total Soccer	Mobile devices		
2003	FIFA Soccer 2004	Game Boy Advance, N-Gage	Electronic Arts	
2003	NCAA Football 2004	N-Gage		
2002	Alex Ferguson's Player Manager 2002	Game Boy Advance	Ubisoft	
2002	FIFA Soccer 2002	PDA	Electronic Arts	
2002	NHL Hitz 20-03	Game Boy Advance		
2002	FIFA Football	Game Boy Advance	Electronic Arts	
2001	Steven Gerrard's Total Soccer 2002	Game Boy Advance	Ubisoft	

== Awards ==
Game	Year	Ceremony / Publication	Award	Result	Ref
Ultimate Sackboy (mobile)	2023	TIGA	Best Arcade Game	Nominated	
Ultimate Sackboy (mobile)	2023	TIGA	Best Casual Game	Nominated	
Ultimate Sackboy (mobile)	2023	TIGA	Best Small Studio	Nominated	
Diggs Nightcrawler	2013	TIGA	Best Casual Game	Nominated	
The Sims 3	2010	BAFTA	Best Handheld Game	Nominated	
The Sims 3 (NDS)	2010	Gamescom	Best Mobile Title	Nominated	
	2009	Develop 100	The World’s Most Successful Game Studios - 2009 Edition	67th	
	2007	Develop 100	The World’s Most Successful Game Studios - 2007 Edition	50th	
	2005	TIGA	Best Handheld Games Development Studio		
