= 2014 Kids' Choice Awards =

Children's television awards show program broadcast in 2014

- Date: March 29, 2014
- Location: Galen Center, Los Angeles, California
- Hosted by: Mark Wahlberg
- Preshow hosts: Jeff Sutphen; Sydney Park; Ryan Newman (Orange Carpet)

Highlights
- Most awards: The Hunger Games: Catching Fire (3)
- Most nominations: The Hunger Games: Catching Fire (4); The Smurfs 2 (4)

Television/radio coverage
- Network: Nickelodeon
- Runtime: 96 minutes
- Viewership: 5.03 million
- Produced by: Bob Bain; Jay Schmalholz; Shelly Sumpter Gillyard (executive producers)
- Directed by: Glenn Weiss

The 27th Annual Nickelodeon Kids' Choice Awards was held on March 29, 2014, at the Galen Center in Los Angeles, California. Actor Mark Wahlberg hosted the ceremony. The "Orange Carpet" was set up in front of Galen Center on the sidewalks of Jefferson Boulevard. Voting was available worldwide on seventeen voting websites in various nations and regions, along with mobile voting depending on region. The "Kids’ Choice Awards Orange Carpet pre-show" was webcast prior to the presentation of the awards. New episodes of Sam & Cat and SpongeBob SquarePants premiered before the ceremony and a new episode of Instant Mom premiered after the ceremony.

== Presenters and performers and stunts ==
=== Host ===
- Mark Wahlberg
- Jeff Sutphen, Sydney Park, and Ryan Newman (Orange Carpet)

=== Musical performers ===
- Todrick Hall - Kids' Choice Awards medley
- Austin Mahone - "Mmm Yeah" (pre-show)
- Aloe Blacc "Wake Me Up"/"The Man" (with the MUSYCA Children's Choir)
- American Authors - "Best Day of My Life"

=== Presenters ===
- Lea Michele
- LL Cool J
- Pharrell Williams
- Kaley Cuoco
- Michael Strahan
- Chris Rock
- Zahra Savannah Rock
- America Ferrera
- Will Arnett
- Jayma Mays
- Ariana Grande
- Cameron Ocasio
- Maree Cheatham
- Zoran Korach
- Kenan Thompson (via video)
- Kel Mitchell
- Nathan Kress
- Noah Munck
- Christopher Massey
- Victoria Justice
- Leon Thomas III
- Avan Jogia
- Matt Bennett
- Daniella Monet
- Drake Bell
- Josh Peck
- Chris Evans
- Kristen Bell
- Ryan Seacrest (via video)
- Keith Urban (via video)
- Harry Connick, Jr. (via video)
- Andy Samberg
- Brie and Nikki Bella
- John Cena
- Jim Parsons
- Queen Latifah (via video)

=== Guest appearances ===
- The stars of Duck Dynasty
- Shaun White
- Cody Simpson
- Austin Mahone
- One Direction (via video)
- Optimus Prime (voiced by Peter Cullen) (via video screen)
- Nicola Peltz
- Jack Reynor
- David Blaine

=== Mosh pit ===
- Debby Ryan
- Tia Mowry-Hardrict
- Carlos Pena Jr.
- Zendaya
- Jake Short
- Bella Thorne
- James Maslow
- Peta Murgatroyd
- Kendall Schmidt
- Sophia Grace & Rosie

== Winners and nominees ==
- The nominees were announced on February 24, 2014.
- Winners are listed first, in **bold**. Other nominees are in alphabetical order.

=== Movies ===
Favorite Movie	Favorite Movie Actor
**The Hunger Games: Catching Fire**; Iron Man 3; Oz the Great and Powerful; The Smurfs 2	**Adam Sandler** – Grown Ups 2 as Lenny Feder; Johnny Depp – The Lone Ranger as Tonto; Robert Downey Jr. – Iron Man 3 as Tony Stark / Iron Man; Neil Patrick Harris – The Smurfs 2 as Patrick Winslow
Favorite Movie Actress	Favorite Animated Movie
**Jennifer Lawrence** – The Hunger Games: Catching Fire as Katniss Everdeen; Sandra Bullock – Gravity as Dr. Ryan Stone; Mila Kunis – Oz the Great and Powerful as Theodora; Jayma Mays – The Smurfs 2 as Grace Winslow	**Frozen**; Cloudy with a Chance of Meatballs 2; Despicable Me 2; Monsters University
Favorite Voice From an Animated Movie	Favorite Male Buttkicker
**Miranda Cosgrove** – Despicable Me 2 as Margo; Steve Carell – Despicable Me 2 as Gru; Billy Crystal – Monsters University as Michael "Mike" Wazowski; Katy Perry – The Smurfs 2 as Smurfette	**Robert Downey Jr.** – Iron Man 3 as Tony Stark / Iron Man; Johnny Depp – The Lone Ranger as Tonto; Hugh Jackman – The Wolverine as Logan / Wolverine; Dwayne Johnson – G.I. Joe: Retaliation as Marvin F. Hinton / Roadblock
Favorite Female Buttkicker
**Jennifer Lawrence** – The Hunger Games: Catching Fire as Katniss Everdeen; Sandra Bullock – Gravity as Dr. Ryan Stone; Evangeline Lilly – The Hobbit: The Desolation of Smaug as Tauriel; Jena Malone – The Hunger Games: Catching Fire as Johanna Mason

=== Television ===
Favorite TV Show	Favorite TV Actor
**Sam & Cat**; The Big Bang Theory; Good Luck Charlie; Jessie	**Ross Lynch** – Austin & Ally as Austin Moon; Benjamin Flores Jr. – The Haunted Hathaways as Louie Preston; Jack Griffo – The Thundermans as Max Thunderman; Jake Short – A.N.T. Farm as Fletcher Quimby
Favorite TV Actress	Favorite Reality Show
**Ariana Grande** – Sam & Cat as Cat Valentine; Jennette McCurdy – Sam & Cat as Sam Puckett; Bridgit Mendler – Good Luck Charlie as Teddy Duncan; Debby Ryan – Jessie as Jessie Prescott	**Wipeout**; America's Got Talent; American Idol; The Voice
Favorite Cartoon	Favorite Animated Animal Sidekick
**SpongeBob SquarePants**; Adventure Time; Phineas and Ferb; Teenage Mutant Ninja Turtles	**Patrick Star** – SpongeBob SquarePants; Perry the Platypus – Phineas and Ferb; Sparky – The Fairly OddParents; Waddles – Gravity Falls

=== Music ===
Favorite Music Group	Favorite Male Singer
**One Direction**; Macklemore & Ryan Lewis; Maroon 5; OneRepublic	**Justin Timberlake**; Bruno Mars; Pitbull; Pharrell Williams
Favorite Female Singer	Favorite Song
**Selena Gomez**; Lady Gaga; Katy Perry; Taylor Swift	**"Story of My Life"** – One Direction; "I Knew You Were Trouble" – Taylor Swift; "Roar" – Katy Perry; "Wrecking Ball" – Miley Cyrus

=== Miscellaneous ===
Favorite App Game	Favorite Book
**Despicable Me: Minion Rush**; Angry Birds Star Wars II; Candy Crush Saga; Temple Run	**Diary of a Wimpy Kid series**; Harry Potter series; The Hobbit; The Hunger Games series
Favorite Funny Star	Favorite Video Game
**Kevin Hart** - Grudge Match as Dante Slate, Jr.; Kaley Cuoco - The Big Bang Theory as Penny; Andy Samberg - Brooklyn Nine-Nine as Jake Peralta, Saturday Night Live as himself; Sofía Vergara - Modern Family as Gloria Delgado-Pritchett	**Just Dance 2014**; Angry Birds Star Wars; Disney Infinity; Minecraft
Most Enthusiastic Athlete	KCA Fan Army
**Dwight Howard**; Cam Newton; David Ortiz; Richard Sherman	**Selenators**; Arianators; Directioners; JT Superfans
Ultimate Slime Stunt	Lifetime Achievement Award
**Ultimate Slime Rodeo**; High-Speed Bathtub Race; Slippery Obstacle Course	**Dan Schneider**
