= Lego The Angry Birds Movie =

Lego theme

- Original teaser image
- Subject: The Angry Birds Movie
- Licensed from: Columbia Pictures and Rovio Entertainment
- Availability: 2016–2017
- Total sets: 6
- Characters: Biker Pig, Bomb, Chef Pig, Chuck, Foreman Pig, King Pig (Leonard), Leonard, Matilda, Mighty Eagle, Piggy, Pilot Pig, Pirate Pig, Red and Stella
- Official website

Lego The Angry Birds Movie is a discontinued Lego theme based on Rovio Entertainment's video game series Angry Birds and The Angry Birds Movie. It was licensed from Columbia Pictures and Rovio Animation. The theme was first introduced in April 2016. The product line was discontinued by the end of 2017.

== Overview ==
Lego The Angry Birds Movie was based on The Angry Birds Movie (2016). The product line focused on a group of birds (Bomb, Chuck, Matilda, Mighty Eagle, Red and Stella) whose eggs are stolen by the green piggies, who wish to eat them. The green piggies are led by the evil King Leonard Mudbeard, who is assisted by Biker Pig, Chef Pig, Foreman Pig, Pilot Pig, Pirate Pig and many piggies. Lego The Angry Birds Movie aimed to recreate the main characters in Lego form, including named Bomb, Chuck, Matilda, Mighty Eagle, Red and Stella. In addition, The Lego Group built a life-sized model of Red, a red bird who appears in The Angry Birds Movie film.

== Development ==
Lego The Angry Birds Movie was inspired by the 2016 film The Angry Birds Movie. The Lego construction toy range was based on the animated film and developed in collaboration with Rovio Entertainment. The construction sets were designed to recreate the story and characters of the animated film in Lego form. The Lego Group VP of licensing and entertainment Jill Wilfert stated, "Our designers are having fun developing building sets that leverage the engaging play and deconstruction found in the Angry Birds game."

== Launch ==
Lego The Angry Birds Movie was launched at the New York Toy Fair in 2016. As part of the marketing campaign, The Lego Group released six toy sets based on the first film. Each set featured a different castle, pirate ship and vehicles. Minifigures including Bomb, Chuck, Matilda, Mighty Eagle, Red and Stella were released as well. Several green piggies including Biker Pig, Chef Pig, Foreman Pig, King Pig (Leonard), Leonard, Piggy, Pilot Pig and Pirate Pig were released as well.

== Construction sets ==
According to BrickLink, The Lego Group released a total of six Lego sets as part of Lego The Angry Birds Movie theme. It was discontinued by the end of 2017.

In 2016, The Lego Group announced a partnership with Columbia Pictures and Rovio Animation to create a licensing and merchandising programme based on The Angry Birds Movie film, which was released on 2 April 2016. The six sets being released were Piggy Car Escape (set number: 75821), Piggy Plane Attack (set number: 75822), Bird Island Egg Heist (set number: 75823), Pig City Teardown (set number: 75824), Piggy Pirate Ship (set number: 75825) and King Pig's Castle (set number: 75826). The sets were designed primarily for children aged 6 to 14 years old. The Angry Birds Action! App tied with construction sets.

=== Piggy Car Escape ===
Piggy Car Escape (set number: 75821) was released on 2 April 2016. The set consisted of 74 pieces with two minifigures. Piggy Car included variety of accessories, a driver's seat and an ice cream shooter. The set included Lego minifigures of Chuck and a Piggy.

=== Piggy Plane Attack ===
Piggy Plane Attack (set number: 75822) was released on 2 April 2016. The set consisted of 168 pieces with two minifigures. Pilot Pig's Piggy Plane included a cockpit for Pilot Pig, a joystick and two flick missiles. It also included a catapult and variety of accessories. The catapult was used to launch Red at the Piggy Plane. The set included Lego minifigures of Red and Pilot Pig.

=== Bird Island Egg Heist ===
Bird Island Egg Heist (set number: 75823) was released on 2 April 2016. The set consisted of 277 pieces with three minifigures. Bird Island Egg Heist included Matilda's House and a Piggy Trike. Biker Pig's Piggy Trike included a giant front wheel and a variety of accessories. The Piggy Trike didn't appear in the film unlike Matilda's house. It also included Billy the Sign and accessories. The set included Lego minifigures of Red, Matilda and Biker Pig.

=== Pig City Teardown ===
Pig City Teardown (set number: 75824) was released on 2 April 2016. The set consisted of 386 pieces with four minifigures. Pig City included a hot dog stand, a small house and a falling boulder. The hot dog stand didn't appear in the film. Target zones included the boulder, the zip-lining pig and the bridge. It also included a catapult and variety of accessories. The catapult was used to launch Red at the Target zones. The set included Lego minifigures of Red, Stella and two piggies.

=== Piggy Pirate Ship ===
Piggy Pirate Ship (set number: 75825) was released on 2 April 2016. The set consisted of 620 pieces with four minifigures. Piggy Pirate Ship included sails, flags, a winch with a boulder attached to it, a crane with a net, wheelhouse and a galley. It also included a crossbow shooter, a jetty-themed catapult and variety of accessories. The jetty catapult was used to launch Red and Bomb at the Piggy Pirate Ship. The set included Lego minifigures of Red, Bomb, Pirate Pig and Leonard.

=== King Pig's Castle ===
King Pig's Castle (set number: 75826) was released on 2 April 2016. The largest set consisted of 859 pieces with five minifigures. King Pig's Castle included an opening gate, collapsible mini-tower and the hangar. Target zones included Golden Crown Tower with a boulder, collapsible tower and the hangar. It also included six eggs and variety of accessories, one of them being blue like in the film's climax. The catapult, in the form of a slingshot was used to launch Red at the Target zones. The set included Lego minifigures of Red, Mighty Eagle, King Pig (Leonard), Chef Pig and Foreman Pig.

== Web shorts ==
The product line was accompanied by a series of animated short films that was released on YouTube inspired by both The Angry Birds Movie film as well as the Lego toyline.

The 6 web shorts have been released on YouTube.

#	Title	Release date	Plot	Notes
1	Super Soaked	April 8, 2016	While Red and Bomb are trying to relax on the beach, a group of pirate piggies invade and steal the eggs.	Lego The Angry Birds Movie animated series
2	The Official Piggy Smash Challenge	April 17, 2016	A trailer for the Piggy Smash Challenge, an event on the official Lego website.	Lego The Angry Birds Movie animated series
3	Downward Pig	April 29, 2016	Red struggles to do yoga at anger management class with Chuck and Matilda, when a group of pigs attack in vehicles.	Lego The Angry Birds Movie animated series
4	Disco Dreaming	May 19, 2016	The pigs construct King Pig's Castle, and steal the eggs while Mighty Eagle is asleep, dreaming about dancing at a disco. Red then desperately tries to wake him up.	Lego The Angry Birds Movie animated series
5	Cooking for King Pig	May 21, 2016	When a plan to retrieve the eggs from being an ingredient in Chef Pig's meal for King Pig fails, Red, Chuck and Bomb chase down King Pig as he flees in a biplane.	Lego The Angry Birds Movie animated series
6	Pig Panic	June 9, 2016	Pirate Pig hurryingly hands a pair of eggs to some pigs having lunch in Pig City, when Red and Stella unleash an attack upon the three to get back the eggs.	Lego The Angry Birds Movie animated series

== See also ==
- Rovio Entertainment
- Lego Prince of Persia
- Lego Minecraft
- Lego Ghostbusters
- Lego Overwatch
- Lego Super Mario
- Lego Sonic the Hedgehog
