= Tiger Woods PGA Tour 08 =

2007 video game

- Developers: EA Tiburon (Note: Ported to Microsoft Windows, Macintosh, PlayStation 2, and Wii by EA Salt Lake); Exient Entertainment (NDS)
- Publisher: EA Sports
- Series: PGA Tour
- Platforms: Microsoft Windows, Nintendo DS, PlayStation 2, Wii, Xbox 360, PlayStation 3, PlayStation Portable, Mac OS X
- Release: Microsoft Windows, Nintendo DS, PlayStation 2, Wii, Xbox 360: NA: August 28, 2007; AU: August 30, 2007; EU: August 31, 2007; PlayStation 3: NA: August 28, 2007; AU: September 20, 2007; EU: September 21, 2007; PlayStation Portable: NA: August 28, 2007; AU: October 4, 2007; EU: October 5, 2007; Mac OS X: NA: September 1, 2007
- Genre: Sports
- Modes: Single-player, multiplayer

Tiger Woods PGA Tour 08 is a sports video game released by EA Sports on all major seventh-generation platforms along with the PlayStation 2, Microsoft Windows and Mac OS X. EA Tiburon developed every version except the Nintendo DS version, which was worked on by Exient Entertainment.

== Reception ==
Reception

Aggregate score
Aggregator	Score						
Aggregator	DS	PC	PS2	PS3	PSP	Wii	Xbox 360
Metacritic	81/100	61/100	65/100	79/100	72/100	72/100	80/100

Review scores
Publication	Score						
Publication	DS	PC	PS2	PS3	PSP	Wii	Xbox 360
Electronic Gaming Monthly	N/A	N/A	N/A	7.67/10	N/A	N/A	7.67/10
Eurogamer	N/A	N/A	N/A	N/A	N/A	N/A	8/10
Game Informer	N/A	N/A	N/A	9/10	N/A	7/10	9/10
GamePro	N/A	N/A	N/A	N/A	N/A	N/A	4.5/5
GameRevolution	N/A	N/A	N/A	N/A	N/A	C	N/A
GameSpot	8/10	N/A	5/10	7/10	6/10	7/10	6.5/10
GameSpy	N/A	N/A	3/5	4.5/5	3.5/5	4/5	4.5/5
GameTrailers	N/A	N/A	N/A	7.7/10	N/A	N/A	7.7/10
GameZone	8.5/10	7.5/10	6.9/10	8.2/10	7.4/10	7.5/10	8.3/10
IGN	8.3/10	N/A	6.7/10	8.5/10	7.5/10	7.1/10	8.5/10
Nintendo Power	8.5/10	N/A	N/A	N/A	N/A	8/10	N/A
Official Xbox Magazine (US)	N/A	N/A	N/A	N/A	N/A	N/A	8.5/10
PC Gamer (US)	N/A	30%	N/A	N/A	N/A	N/A	N/A
PlayStation: The Official Magazine	N/A	N/A	N/A	8/10	N/A	N/A	N/A
Digital Spy	N/A	N/A	N/A	N/A	N/A	N/A	4/5

Tiger Woods PGA Tour 08 received "mixed or average" and "generally favorable" reviews, according to review aggregator website Metacritic.

Games for Windows gave the PC version 7.5 out of 10.
