= Lego Sonic the Hedgehog =

Lego theme

- Subject: Sonic the Hedgehog
- Licensed from: Sega
- Availability: August 1, 2023–present (Note: Two one-off sets released under the Lego Dimensions and Lego Ideas lines were previously released on November 18, 2016 and January 1, 2022 respectively.)
- Total sets: 17 sets (Note: 12 sets in total if counting one-off sets released under the Lego Dimensions, Lego Ideas and Lego BrickHeadz lines.)
- Characters: Sonic the Hedgehog, Miles "Tails" Prower, Amy Rose, Doctor Eggman, Shadow the Hedgehog, Knuckles the Echidna, Rouge the Bat, Metal Sonic, Silver The Hedgehog
- Official website

Lego Sonic the Hedgehog (stylized as LEGO Sonic the Hedgehog) is a Lego theme based on the Sonic the Hedgehog video game series created by Yuji Naka, Naoto Ohshima and Hirokazu Yasuhara. It is licensed from Sega. The theme was first introduced in 2023.

== Overview ==
The product line focuses on Sonic, an anthropomorphic blue hedgehog who battles the evil Doctor Eggman, a mad scientist. Lego Sonic the Hedgehog aimed to recreate the main characters in Lego form, including Sonic the Hedgehog, Miles "Tails" Prower, Amy Rose and Doctor Eggman.

== Development ==
Prior to the theme's official launch, Sonic the Hedgehog was included in the Lego crossover video game, Lego Dimensions, with a level pack being released in 2016. Lego Sonic the Hedgehog began with the release of a user-designed construction set based initially on the video game Sonic Mania and the final product was based on the first level from the first game, Sonic the Hedgehog. The design was submitted to Lego Ideas by Lego superfan Viv Grannell. The design achieved 10,000 votes, after which it was selected for production. Viv Grannell said, "I've been invested in the world of Sonic for almost my entire life, and it's such a perfect fit for the LEGO system that I spent about a year rallying support for it to happen. Having 10,000 people back my design was overwhelming enough, even with friends and family behind me, but having it be selected for further development was the most exciting secret I have ever had to keep!". The set was produced to celebrate the 30th anniversary of the original 1991 video game.

Lego Sonic the Hedgehog was inspired by the Sonic the Hedgehog video game series. The Lego construction toy range was based on the classic video game series and developed in collaboration with The Lego Group and Sega. The construction sets were designed to recreate the story and characters of the classic video game series in Lego form.

== Launch ==
Following the released of Sonic the Hedgehog Level Pack (set number: 71244) for the Lego Dimensions toys-to-life video game in 2016 and Sonic the Hedgehog - Green Hill Zone (set number: 21331) for Lego Ideas in 2022. Lego Sonic the Hedgehog theme was launched on August 1, 2023. The Lego Group had a partnership with Sega. As part of the marketing campaign, The Lego Group released the four sets based on Sonic the Hedgehog video game series. Each set featured different Animal Rescue Island, Green Hill Zone Loop Challenge, Speed Sphere Challenge, Workshop and Tornado Plane. Included minifigures of Sonic the Hedgehog, Tails, Amy Rose and Doctor Eggman were released as well. The sets were designed primarily for children with an age rating of 6+ or above. In addition, Sonic Central revealed Sonic vs. Dr. Eggman's Death Egg Robot (set number: 76993) will be released as well.

== Characters ==
- Sonic the Hedgehog: An anthropomorphic blue hedgehog who can run at supersonic speed and can curl into a ball to attack enemies. He has the ability to absorb the energy of the Chaos Emeralds to transform into his powerful "Super Sonic" form.
- Miles "Tails" Prower: A two-tailed yellow fox who is Sonic's best friend and sidekick. He can use his tails to propel himself into the air for flight, he is also skilled at inventing various gadgets like the biplane called the Tornado.
- Amy Rose: A pink energetic hedgehog and Sonic's admirer. She adores animals, skilled with tarot cards and is often seen wielding her trusty Piko Piko Hammer.
- Knuckles the Echidna: A red echidna from Angel Island who is the sworn protector of the Master Emerald. He has spiked knuckles that let him smash rocks, climb and burrow underground, his dreadlocks also allow him to glide through the air.
- Shadow the Hedgehog: A black hedgehog created by Dr. Eggman's grandfather to be the "Ultimate Life Form". He is fueled with Chaos Energy that grants him unlimited power and is equipped with Air Shoes that makes him equally fast as Sonic, he too can absorb energy from the Chaos Emeralds to transform into "Super Shadow".
- Rouge the Bat: A white bat who is a professional treasure hunter and rival of Knuckles due to her attempts of stealing the Master Emerald. She works for the Guardian Units of Nations (G.U.N.) who occasionally partners herself with Shadow.
- Dr. Eggman: A human mad scientist with a 300 IQ and the main antagonist of the series who plans for world conquest to build his Eggman Empire. He commonly creates his wide variety of "Badnik" military robots and mostly serves as a recurring boss by piloting a vehicle of his design assisted with his Egg Mobile.
- Cubot: a yellow, cube-shaped robot who is one of Doctor Eggman's lackeys. He serves as the comic relief in Eggman's operations to conquer the world. His most defining trait is his malfunctioning voice chip, which gives him different accents and personalities.
- Metal Sonic: A robotic counterpart to Sonic built by Dr. Eggman. He is similar in appearance to Sonic, and is able to match his speed, strength, and stamina.
- Silver the Hedgehog: A silver-furred hedgehog from 200 years in the future of the main timeline. He is a well-known ally and rival of Sonic, and helps him whenever he travels to Sonic's time to stop dangerous threats that would pose a great danger to the safety and existence of his own timeline. Silver has psychokinesis, which allows him to fly and pick up objects or people via his mental focus.

== List of sets ==
=== Lego Sonic the Hedgehog sets ===
According to BrickLink, The Lego Group released a total of ten Lego sets as part of Lego Sonic the Hedgehog theme.

Name	Number	Minifigures	Released	Pieces
Sonic's Speed Sphere Challenge	76990	Sonic the Hedgehog, Motobug	1 August 2023	292
Tails' Workshop and Tornado Plane	76991	Sonic the Hedgehog, Tails, Buzz Bomber	1 August 2023	376
Amy's Animal Rescue Island	76992	Amy Rose, Tails, Crabmeat	1 August 2023	388
Sonic vs. Dr. Eggman's Death Egg Robot	76993	Sonic the Hedgehog, Dr. Eggman, Cubot	1 August 2023	615
Sonic's Green Hill Zone Loop Challenge	76994	Sonic the Hedgehog, Dr. Eggman, Amy Rose, Chopper, Newtron	1 August 2023	802
Shadow's Escape	76995	Shadow the Hedgehog, RhinoBot	1 December 2023	196
Knuckles' Guardian Mech	76996	Knuckles the Echidna, Rouge the Bat	1 January 2024	276
Tails' Adventure Boat	76997	Sonic the Hedgehog, Tails, Jaws	1 August 2024	393
Knuckles and the Master Emerald Shrine	76998	Knuckles the Echidna, Amy Rose, EggRobo	1 August 2024	325
Super Sonic vs. Egg Drillster	76999	Super Sonic, Shadow the Hedgehog, Dr. Eggman, Egg Pawn, G.U.N. Wing	1 August 2024	590
Sonic's Campfire Clash	77001	Sonic the Hedgehog	1 January 2025	177
Cyclone vs. Metal Sonic	77002	Tails, Metal Sonic	1 January 2025	290
Super Shadow vs. Biolizard	77003	Super Shadow, Super Sonic	1 January 2025	419
Knuckles vs. Dr. Eggman Egg Crusher Mech	77005	Knuckles the Echidna, Dr. Eggman	1 August 2025	350
Team Sonic Command Truck	77006	Sonic the Hedgehog, Tails, Metal Sonic	1 August 2025	747
Sonic: Speedster Lightning	77117	Sonic the Hedgehog	1 January 2026	126
Silver's Car vs. Knuckles' Monster Truck	77118	Silver the Hedgehog, Knuckles the Echidna	1 January 2026	378
Tails’s Tornado-1	77119	Tails	1 August 2026	310
Shadow's Mech vs. G.U.N. Trooper	77120	Shadow the Hedgehog	1 August 2026	374

=== Lego Ideas set ===
Name	Number	Minifigures	Released	Pieces
Sonic the Hedgehog - Green Hill Zone	21331	Sonic the Hedgehog, Dr. Eggman, Crabmeat, Motobug	1 January 2022	1,125

=== Lego Dimensions set ===
Name	Number	Minifigures	Released	Pieces
Sonic the Hedgehog Level Pack	71244	Sonic the Hedgehog	18 November 2016	101

=== Lego BrickHeadz sets ===
Name	Number	Released	Pieces
Sonic the Hedgehog	40627	1 September 2023	139
Miles "Tails" Prower	40628	1 September 2023	131
Knuckles & Shadow	40672	1 February 2024	298

== Web shorts ==
The product line was accompanied by a series of animated short films that was released on YouTube.

- LEGO Ideas Sonic the Hedgehog™ – Green Hill Zone 21331 Designer Video was an official web short was released on YouTube on 14 January 2022. It features Lego Ideas Design Manager Sam Liltorp Johnson and Graphic Designer Lauren Cullen King discussed about Sonic the Hedgehog - Green Hill Zone (set number: 21331).
- NEW Sonic The Hedgehog LEGO sets was an official web short was released on YouTube on 19 April 2023 that inspired by both four Lego Sonic the Hedgehog sets as well as the Sonic the Hedgehog video game series.
- Sonic x Lego Collaboration Trailer Sonic Central 2023 was an official web short was released on YouTube on 24 June 2023 that inspired by both Sonic vs. Dr. Eggman's Death Egg Robot (set number: 76993) as well as the Sonic the Hedgehog video game series. Also features Lego designer Carl Merriam mind-controlled by Doctor Eggman's minifigure.
- Addressing LEGO HQ's New Leadership was an official web short was released on YouTube on 17 July 2023. It features Lego designer Carl Merriam mind-controlled by Doctor Eggman's minifigure and took over the LEGO Group's Billund HQ.
- LEGO Sonic to the rescue! was an official web short was released on YouTube on 1 August 2023. It features Lego designer Nico Vás and Sonic the Hedgehog minifigure to save the LEGO Group's Billund HQ from Doctor Eggman's minifigure.
- This giant LEGO Sonic & Doctor Eggman model is going on the road! First stop: Gamescom 2023 was an official web short was released on YouTube on 23 August 2023. It features The Lego Group built a life-sized model of Sonic and Doctor Eggman who appears in the video game. The model contained a total of 383,217 Lego bricks and 1450 hours to build. They were placed in front of the Gamescom.

== Video games ==
A Sonic the Hedgehog-themed pack for the toys-to-life video game Lego Dimensions was released on November 18, 2016. The level pack contained a playable Sonic the Hedgehog, Sonic Speedster and The Tornado, and unlocks an additional Sonic the Hedgehog-themed level and world. In the level (titled "Sonic Dimensions"), Doctor Eggman has stolen a Keystone Device, which allows him to control other dimensions with the use of the Chaos Emeralds. It is up for Sonic to retrieve the emeralds and the device out of the evil doctor's hands in order to save the world. Along the way, Sonic must also search for his friends, battle his metal counterparts, and face off against Chaos, who absorbed the device and used its elemental abilities.

Lego versions of Sonic, Doctor Eggman, Tails and Amy were made available as playable characters for a limited time in the Sonic Forces: Speed Battle and Sonic Dash mobile games, added in August 2023 to coincide with the launch of the theme.

To promote the theme, a cosmetic skin for Sonic based on his Lego minifigure is available as free downloadable content for Sonic Superstars, released alongside the game on October 17, 2023. Additional Lego-themed skins for Tails, Knuckles, and Amy are available as part of the game's special edition, along with Lego-themed arenas for the game's multiplayer mode. A similar Lego-themed skin for Doctor Eggman was also offered as a pre-order incentive.

== Reception ==
The Sonic the Hedgehog - Green Hill Zone set based on the first level of the original 1991 video game was released on January 1, 2022, to mixed reviews, such as that of Alice Clarke from Kotaku, who called it "not the most thrilling build", remarking its costly price, but went on to state that Sonic fans would love it. Mike Harris of GamesRadar gave the set a 4/5 rating and commented, "Sonic-themed presentation will delight fans."

== See also ==
- Lego Prince of Persia
- Lego The Angry Birds Movie
- Lego Minecraft
- Lego Overwatch
- Lego Super Mario
- Lego BrickHeadz
