= Angry Birds Trilogy =

2012 video game

- European packaging artwork
- Developers: Exient; Housemarque
- Publisher: Activision
- Composer: Ari Pulkkinen
- Series: Angry Birds
- Platforms: Nintendo 3DS; PlayStation 3; Xbox 360; Wii; Wii U; PlayStation Vita
- Release: Nintendo 3DS, PlayStation 3, Xbox 360; WW: September 2012; Wii, Wii U; WW: August 13, 2013; PlayStation Vita; EU: October 16, 2013
- Genres: Compilation, puzzle
- Mode: Single-player

Angry Birds Trilogy is a 2012 video game compilation developed by Exient and Housemarque, and published by Activision. It contains the first three games in the Angry Birds franchise by Rovio Entertainment as well as additional content. It was released for multiple platforms in late 2012, with ports for the Wii, Wii U, and PlayStation Vita following in 2013. It has received mixed reception from critics and journalists.

== Gameplay ==
Angry Birds Trilogy includes three physics-based puzzle games from the Angry Birds series: Angry Birds (2009), Angry Birds Seasons (2010), and Angry Birds Rio (2011). The goal of each game is to, using a slingshot, launch birds at towers housing pigs who have stolen the birds' eggs. Destroying towers and pigs, as well as having leftover birds, awards the player with score points and a star rating out of three.

Trilogy includes 700 levels in total, alongside 19 additional new levels. Each version features push-button and analog stick controls as well as additional differing methods; the Nintendo 3DS and Wii U versions support touchscreen controls, and the Xbox version supports motion controls through Kinect. The Nintendo 3DS version includes a "Migration" mode, in which the player records a song composed of bird sound effects that is then sent off via StreetPass. General additional features include high-definition video, achievements, and 5.1 surround sound.

== Development and release ==
Rovio Entertainment had planned to port Angry Birds to video game consoles since 2011. Activision teased a console port at E3 2012, later announcing it as Angry Birds Trilogy in July 2012. It was developed by Exient and Housemarque, who built it "from the ground up" for high-definition television.

Angry Birds Trilogy was released for Nintendo 3DS, PlayStation 3, and Xbox 360 in September 2012. It was ported to Wii and Wii U on August 13, 2013, followed by a European port for PlayStation Vita on October 16, 2013.

== Reception ==
Reception

Aggregate score
Aggregator	Score
Metacritic	X360: 63/100; PS3: 66/100; 3DS: 62/100

Review scores
Publication	Score
Eurogamer	X360/PS3: 6/10
IGN	7/10
Nintendo Life	Wii U: 8/10

Angry Birds Trilogy's average critical score on Metacritic, a review aggregate website, varies between platforms. The Xbox 360 version has a score of 63 out of 100, based on 13 critic reviews. The PlayStation 3 version has a score of 66 based on 8 reviews. The Nintendo 3DS version has a score of 62 based on 7 reviews.

Lucas M. Thomas, writing for IGN, noted the enhanced visuals and its extras, but was unfavorable on the motion controls, as opposed to the standard controls, and the price tag. "If you've already spent your $2.97 before [...] just go back to your iPhone. If unhealthily addicted to all things Angry Birds though, feel free to pick up this package." The latter remark was also made by Ron DelVillano of Nintendo Life. Robert Workman of GameZone criticized the 3DS version, comparably to the home console versions and the original mobile one, regarding the design as underwhelming and effects as "minimal". Dan Whitehead of Eurogamer decried the Kinect feature on the Xbox 360 version, calling it worse than the gameplay on the mobile versions, and slightly worse than the PlayStation Move.
