= Angry Birds Transformers =

2014 video game

- Publisher: Rovio Entertainment
- Composers: Vince DiCola; Kenny Meriedeth
- Series: Angry Birds
- Platforms: Android iOS; Fire OS
- Release: October 15, 2014 (iOS); October 30, 2014 (Android); November 4, 2014 (Fire OS)
- Genre: Run and gun
- Mode: Single-player

Angry Birds Transformers is a 2014 run and gun video game published by Rovio Entertainment. It is a spinoff in the Angry Birds franchise and a crossover with Hasbro's Transformers franchise. As various Transformers characters combined with those from Angry Birds, the player runs through levels shooting down pigs and buildings. Angry Birds Transformers initially released in October 2014 for mobile devices. It received a mixed response from critics and was followed by a comic book miniseries by IDW Publishing in 2015.

== Gameplay ==
A screenshot of gameplay, in which Bumblebee runs through a level and shoots a structure housing a pig

Angry Birds Transformers is a run and gun video game. The player controls Angry Birds portraying Transformers characters—including Optimus Prime, Bumblebee, and Arcee—as the "Autobirds" and "Deceptihogs". In each level, the player character runs automatically while the player taps the touchscreen to shoot buildings, scenery and enemy pigs. Each character has a different type of attack. Some pigs will shoot back at the player and buildings will fall onto the player's path; both inflict damage towards the player. The player character can transform into vehicle mode, allowing them to dodge falling towers and avoid death. Additionally, if the player is signed into Facebook, a friend can be summoned to assist for a limited period of time.

Additional abilities, which can be charged by collecting energon from background elements, are unlocked as the game progresses. For clearing levels, the player is rewarded with pigs and coins as virtual currency; pigs are used to unlock characters, while coins are used to unlock new areas and upgrade characters. The time taken for characters to upgrade increases gradually; gems can be spent to finish upgrades instantly. Gems are earnt by clearing achievements or when the player is summoned by a friend.

As part of their deal, Hasbro produced a line of toys-to-life Telepods figures to coincide with the game's release. When scanned, Telepods figures will boost the power of characters and temporarily unlock new ones, serving as an alternative to microtransactions.

== Development and release ==
Angry Birds Transformers is the third collaboration between Rovio Entertainment and Hasbro, following Angry Birds Star Wars (2012) and Angry Birds Go! (2013). According to Blanca Juti, chief marketing officer at Rovio, the crossover was intended to "appeal to those who grew up with the [Transformers] brand in the '80s, as well as fans of the brand today".

Angry Birds Transformers was announced in June 2014, and a teaser trailer recreating the animated series The Transformers was uploaded in September. Angry Birds Transformers soft launched for iOS on October 15, 2014, later being ported to Android on October 30 and the Amazon Appstore on November 4. Upon its release, a software bug that allowed players to gain US$69.99 worth of gems was discovered.

== Reception ==
Reception

Aggregate score
Aggregator	Score
Metacritic	70/100

Review scores
Publication	Score
Pocket Gamer	3.5/5
TouchArcade	3/5

On Metacritic, a review aggregator website, Angry Birds Transformers has a critic score of 70 based on 13 critic reviews, indicating "mixed or average" reviews. Stuart Dredge from The Guardian praised the attention to detail and faithfulness to the Transformers franchise, but was sceptical about its freemium features. Shaun Musgrave for TouchArcade, as well as Pocket Gamer's Peter Willington, both wrote that Angry Birds Transformers is fun and well-designed and praised its use of both franchises, but added that it is decremented by its long amounts of waiting and grinding.

== Other media ==
At the 2014 San Diego Comic-Con, IDW Publishing, Hasbro and Rovio announced an Angry Birds Transformers comic book series; it was written by John Barber and art by Marcelo Ferreira and published in early 2015 as a four-issue miniseries.
