= Angry Birds =

Finnish media franchise

- Logo used since 2015
- Created by: Jaakko Iisalo
- Original work: Angry Birds (2009)
- Owners: Rovio Entertainment; Sega (since 2023)
- Years: 2009–present

Films and television
- Films: The Angry Birds Movie (2016); The Angry Birds Movie 2 (2019); The Angry Birds Movie 3 (2026)
- Animated series: Angry Birds Toons (2013–2016); Piggy Tales (2014–2019); Angry Birds Stella (2014–2016); Angry Birds Blues (2017); Angry Birds Slingshot Stories (2020–2026); Angry Birds: Summer Madness (2022); Angry Birds Mystery Island (2024)

Games
- Video games: List of games

Audio
- Soundtrack: The Angry Birds Movie (2016)

Miscellaneous
- Toy: Lego The Angry Birds Movie (2016-2017)
- Theme park attractions: Särkänniemi (2012-2023); Thorpe Park (2014-2023)

Official website
- https://www.angrybirds.com

Angry Birds is a video game series and media franchise created by Finnish game designer Jaakko Iisalo and owned by Rovio Entertainment, a subsidiary of Sega. The franchise primarily follows a flock of anthropomorphic flightless birds as they defend their nest of eggs from a species of green rotund pigs. A majority of the Angry Birds video games are puzzle games developed by Rovio Entertainment and released for mobile devices, while other games and spinoffs have been developed by other studios and are in other genres such as racing, role-playing, and tile-matching. The franchise also includes other media such as merchandise, theme parks, television, and feature films.

The first game in the series, Angry Birds, was developed and released in 2009. After its success, Angry Birds became their flagship franchise. Several puzzle successors followed, with the first spinoff, Bad Piggies, releasing in 2012. The first media adaptation, television series Angry Birds Toons, premiered in 2013. A theatrical film, The Angry Birds Movie, was released in 2016, followed by a sequel, The Angry Birds Movie 2, in 2019. A third film, The Angry Birds Movie 3, is scheduled for 2026.

Angry Birds is one of the highest-grossing media franchises and the most downloaded mobile videogame series. Its first game is considered one of the best games of all time, and its early successors have received positive critical reception. The franchise is frequently referenced in popular culture and has had multiple cross-promotions.

== History ==
Release timeline
2009	Angry Birds
2010	Seasons
2011	Rio
2012	Friends
2012	Space
2012	Trilogy
2012	Bad Piggies
2012	Star Wars
2013	Star Wars II
2013	Go!
2014	Epic
2014	Stella
2014	Transformers
2015	POP!
2015	Fight!
2015	Angry Birds 2
2016	Action!
2016	Blast!
2017	Evolution
2017	Hatchlings
2018	Champions
2018	for Messenger
2019	Dream Blast
2019	Isle of Pigs
2019	Explore
2019	Under Pressure
2020
2021	Reloaded
2021	Bird Island
2022	Journey
2022	Rovio Classics: Angry Birds
2023
2024	for Automotive
2025	Bounce
2025	Flock Party
2026	Match

=== 2009–2012: Conception and initial successors ===
The first game in the series, Angry Birds, was conceptualised as a result of Rovio Entertainment only having the funds to produce one game. The idea originated from a sketch by designer Jaakko Iisalo, and its physics-based gameplay was inspired by the Adobe Flash game Crush the Castle (2009).

Following the game's success, Rovio Entertainment released its first successor, titled Angry Birds Halloween, exclusively for iOS on 21 October 2010. The game was later renamed to Angry Birds Seasons and was ported to Android devices in December 2010 alongside a Christmas-themed update. Multiple other Angry Birds titles would follow Seasons. In 2011, a tie-in with the film Rio, titled Angry Birds Rio, was developed by Rovio and released on 22 March. Following its release, The Independent reported that Angry Birds Rio had "the biggest launch ever for Rovio". Rio is the first of numerous Angry Birds crossovers, being followed by Angry Birds Star Wars (2012) and Angry Birds Transformers (2014). The series' first spin-off, a game titled Bad Piggies starring the pigs, was released on 27 September 2012.

=== 2012–2019: Adaptations and sequels ===
The video games received their first media adaptation in 2013 with the premiere of the animated television series Angry Birds Toons on 13 March. Following the series' announcement in 2012, head of animation Nick Dorra also confirmed that a feature film based on the Angry Birds game was in production, but would not release until after 2014. Rovio later announced two other animated series—Piggy Tales and Angry Birds Stella—alongside a second season of Angry Birds Toons, which were all released in 2014.

On 16 July 2015, Rovio announced a direct sequel to the original Angry Birds game, titled Angry Birds 2, which was slated for a full release on 30 July. Following the sequel, the teaser trailer for The Angry Birds Movie was released, receiving negative reception. The Angry Birds Movie was released in theatres by Sony Pictures Releasing on 20 May 2016. A tie-in prequel game featuring augmented reality gameplay and the film's character designs, titled Angry Birds Action!, was released for mobile devices in 2016 to promote the film's release. The following year, in 2017, a sequel to The Angry Birds Movie was announced, scheduled for a theatrical release on 20 September 2019.

=== 2019–2023: Discontinuation of legacy titles ===
In 2019, several early games from the franchise—such as Angry Birds and Angry Birds Seasons—were delisted from app stores due to Rovio being unable to update them to match modern standards. This resulted in backlash, to which Rovio responded by announcing remakes of the discontinued titles. The first of these remakes, Rovio Classics: Angry Birds, was developed by Rovio using the Unity game engine and was released for iOS and Android on 31 March 2022. In February 2023, however, the remake was delisted from Google Play, whilst being renamed to Red's First Flight on the App Store. This was due to the remake having a negative impact on other Angry Birds games by being prioritised over them in search results.

=== 2023–2026: Sega acquisition ===
In August 2023, Sega completed their acquisition of Rovio Entertainment for US$776 million. In 2024, a crossover event between mobile games in the Angry Birds and Sega's Sonic the Hedgehog franchises was held from 14–21 March; Angry Birds characters were featured as unlockable player characters in Sonic Dash (2013) and Sonic Forces: Speed Battle (2017), while Sonic-themed elements such as levels, power-ups and cosmetics were added to Angry Birds Friends (2012), Angry Birds 2, and Angry Birds Dream Blast (2018). Angry Birds characters have additionally appeared in other Sega games such as Super Monkey Ball Banana Rumble (2024), Sonic Racing: CrossWorlds (2025), and Two Point Museum (2025).

Later in 2024, The Angry Birds Movie 3 was announced to be in production, with Sega producing alongside Rovio and Namit Malhotra. It will be released theatrically by Paramount Pictures on 23 December 2026.

== Media ==
=== Video games ===
As of 11 December 2024, the Angry Birds series has received over twenty instalments. This includes several follow-ups, spinoffs, and crossovers with other franchises.

From 2011 to 2017, Angry Birds collaborated with many other companies and released variations of the original game in the respective collaborators' theme. Most of them were Flash-based, and all of them featured exclusive levels and elements that aided in promotion.

- Angry Birds Chrome
- Angry Birds Google+
- Angry Birds Free with Magic (specific NFC-compatible Nokia phones only)
- Angry Birds Volcano (Fazer's Tyrkisk Peber Volcano)
- Angry Birds Breakfast (Nesquik cereal)
- Angry Birds in The Hunt For The Golden Pistachio (Wonderful Pistachios)
- Angry Birds Vuela Tazos (PepsiCo's Tazos)
- Angry Birds Cheetos
- Angry Birds Lotus F1 Team
- Angry Birds McDonald's (China only)
- Angry Birds Coca-Cola (Chinese Olympic team partnership, China only)
- Angry Birds Heikki (Heikki Kovalainen partnership)
- Angry Birds Telepizza
- Angry Birds Fuji TV
- Angry Birds in Ultrabook Adventure (Intel's Ultrabook)
- Angry Birds Philadelphia Eagles

=== Television ===
Series	Season	Episodes		Originally released		Status	Network
Series	Season	Episodes		First released	Last released	Status	Network
Toons.TV
Angry Birds Toons	1	52		17 March 2013	8 March 2014	Concluded	Toons.TV
Angry Birds Toons	2	26		19 October 2014	12 April 2015	Concluded	Toons.TV
Angry Birds Toons	3	26		1 October 2015	13 May 2016	Concluded	Toons.TV
Piggy Tales	1	31		17 April 2014	31 March 2015	Concluded	Toons.TV
Piggy Tales	2	26		17 April 2015	1 March 2016	Concluded	Toons.TV
Piggy Tales	3	34		3 June 2016	3 February 2017	Concluded	Toons.TV
Piggy Tales	4	30		20 October 2017	30 May 2019	Concluded	Toons.TV
Angry Birds Stella	1	13		1 November 2014	24 January 2015	Concluded	Toons.TV
Angry Birds Stella	2	13		9 October 2015	11 March 2016	Concluded	Toons.TV
Angry Birds Blues	1	30		10 March 2017	14 December 2017	Concluded	Toons.TV
YouTube
Angry Birds BirLd Cup	1	10		9 June 2018	11 July 2018	Concluded	YouTube
Angry Birds Zero Gravity	1	3		3 October 2018	13 October 2018	Concluded	YouTube
Angry Birds on the Run	1	22		17 November 2018	20 April 2019	Concluded	YouTube
Angry Birds on the Run	2	18		13 June 2020	24 October 2020	Concluded	YouTube
Angry Birds MakerSpace	1	20		1 June 2019	4 January 2020	Concluded	YouTube
Angry Birds MakerSpace	2	20		28 May 2022	29 October 2022	Concluded	YouTube
Angry Birds MakerSpace	3	20		1 September 2024	2 February 2025	Concluded	YouTube
Angry Birds Slingshot Stories	1	10		18 January 2020	28 March 2020	Concluded	YouTube
Angry Birds Slingshot Stories	2	30		19 June 2021	29 January 2022	Concluded	YouTube
Angry Birds Slingshot Stories	3	30		15 October 2023	9 June 2024	Concluded	YouTube
Angry Birds Slingshot Stories	4	40		11 May 2025	29 March 2026	Concluded	YouTube
Angry Birds Slingshot Space Stories	1	3		15 October 2025	29 October 2025	Concluded	YouTube
Angry Birds Bubble Trouble	1	20		5 December 2020	8 May 2021	Concluded	YouTube
Angry Birds Bubble Trouble	2	28		10 December 2022	22 July 2023	Concluded	YouTube
Streaming
Angry Birds: Summer Madness	1	16		28 January 2022		Concluded	Netflix
Angry Birds: Summer Madness	2	16		24 June 2022		Concluded	Netflix
Angry Birds: Summer Madness	3	4		25 August 2022		Concluded	Netflix
Angry Birds Mystery Island	1	24	8	21 May 2024		Concluded	Amazon Prime Video
Angry Birds Mystery Island	1	24	8	20 August 2024		Concluded	Amazon Prime Video
Angry Birds Mystery Island	1	24	8	3 December 2024		Concluded	Amazon Prime Video

Angry Birds Toons, a TV series based on the game, made its debut on 16 March 2013. Angry Birds Toons was released through third-party video distribution platforms, including Comcast's Xfinity On-Demand in the US, Samsung Smart TVs, and Roku set-top boxes. It is also available in a number of countries on traditional television broadcasts. Angry Birds Toons is still accessible on mobile devices by an additional Angry Birds Toons channel on all of the Angry Birds apps homescreens. The DVD releases were released by Sony Pictures Home Entertainment. The series has a total of 3 seasons.

On 11 April 2014, Rovio released Piggy Tales, a stop motion animated series. It tells the stories of the Minion Pigs' life.

On 1 November 2014, Rovio released Angry Birds Stella, an animated series telling the stories of Stella's life and that of her friends on their own island.

On 3 July 2015, Rovio released the Rocket Science Show, an educational live-action-animated series, the NASA tell viewers facts about planets in the Solar System.

On 12 July 2015, Real Angry Birds, inspired by the game Angry Birds, premiered on Nat Geo Wild.

In 2016, Rovio released Fun Game Coding, another educational live-action-animated series, containing insightful instructions from tech-savvy Rovio employees.

Rovio partnered with Canadian animation studio Bardel Entertainment to produce Angry Birds Blues, a television series that released on Toons.TV on March 10, 2017. Teased in credits of The Angry Birds Movie, it follows the lives of the Blues—a trio of blue hatchling triplets—as well as the Hatchlings. The series consists of 30 episodes, which were released weekly.

On 3 July 2017, Netflix and KidsClick picked up every Angry Birds Toons, Angry Birds Stella, and Piggy Tales episode in the form of 23 compilations.

On 1 June 2018, U.S. television production company Big Fish Entertainment announced that they would be partnering with Rovio to create a game show based on Angry Birds currently called Angry Birds Challenge.

On 9 June 2018, a series titled Angry Birds BirLd Cup was released on YouTube. It follows two teams (Team Red and Team Chuck) of rambunctious kids ready to put their soccer skills to the test. With Everton stars Wayne Rooney, Dominic Calvert-Lewin, Tom Davies, and Cenk Tosun on hand to lend their expertise and officiate the competition, the two teams will go head to head in a series of soccer-centric challenges to earn points. The team that scores the most points will claim the illustrious BirLd Cup, and BirLdwide acclaim.

On 3 October 2018, a short, three-episode series titled Angry Birds Zero Gravity was released on YouTube.

On 17 November 2018, a series titled Angry Birds on the Run was released on YouTube. The series focuses on the birds being sent to the real world from a girl's phone, causing mayhem while the pigs are looking for them.

In late 2018, Rovio announced that a new, long-form Angry Birds television series titled Angry Birds: Summer Madness is in production and was originally set for release in 2021 on Netflix. It was pushed and was released in January 2022. It focuses on Red, Stella, Bomb, and Chuck as teenagers in summer camp causing mayhem with their teacher being the Mighty Eagle.

On 1 June 2019, a series titled Angry Birds MakerSpace was released on YouTube. It features the birds and pigs working together in a shared workspace.

On 18 January 2020, a series titled Angry Birds Slingshot Stories was released on YouTube. It features structures from the original Angry Birds game and shows the birds and pigs' life outside the levels.

On 31 August 2020, a new series titled Angry Birds Bubble Trouble was released on Amazon Freetime Unlimited and YouTube. It shows Red, Chuck, Bomb, Silver, and Stella in their Dream Blast designs having fun and dreaming.

On 6 June 2023, a new long-form television series titled Angry Birds Mystery Island was announced, which was released on Amazon Prime Video and Amazon Kids+ on 21 May 2024. The series focus on a new group of Hatchlings, trying to survive on an uncharted island.

=== Films ===
Film	U.S. release date	Director(s)	Screenwriter(s)	Producer(s)	Composer	Distributor
The Angry Birds Movie	20 May 2016	Clay Kaytis; Fergal Reilly	Jon Vitti	John Cohen; Catherine Winder	Heitor Pereira	Sony Pictures Releasing
The Angry Birds Movie 2	14 August 2019	Thurop Van Orman; John Rice (co-director)	Peter Ackerman; Eyal Podell; Jonathan E. Stewart	John Cohen	Heitor Pereira	Sony Pictures Releasing
The Angry Birds Movie 3	23 December 2026	John Rice	Thurop Van Orman	John Cohen; Dan Chuba; Carla Connor	Heitor Pereira	Paramount Pictures

==== The Angry Birds Movie (2016) ====
An animated film adaptation, The Angry Birds Movie, was released on 20 May 2016 which fully anthropomorphizes the characters for the first time, giving them limbs and voices. Developed, produced and financed by Rovio Entertainment, it is animated by Sony Pictures Imageworks and distributed worldwide by Sony Pictures Releasing through its Columbia Pictures label. It is directed by animation veterans Clay Kaytis and Fergal Reilly in their directorial debut. Jon Vitti wrote the film's screenplay, and John Cohen and Catherine Winder served as the producers. Rovio also hired David Maisel, former executive producer of Marvel Studios films such as Iron Man, to be the executive producer of its feature-length films.

==== The Angry Birds Movie 2 (2019) ====
A sequel, The Angry Birds Movie 2, was released on 14 August 2019 which was co-produced by both Rovio Animation and Sony Pictures Animation. Directed by the creator of The Marvelous Misadventures of Flapjack, Thurop Van Orman, the sequel breaks from the series' source material by having the Birds and Pigs ending their rivalry to form an alliance to battle a larger threat, as well as becoming one of the most critically well-received video game film adaptations ever made, garnering an unprecedented score of 73% from Rotten Tomatoes.

==== The Angry Birds Movie 3 (2026) ====
A second sequel, The Angry Birds Movie 3, was announced on 6 June 2024, with DNEG Animation and Rovio's new parent company Sega Sammy Group producing without the involvement of Sony Pictures. The film is scheduled to be released in theatres on 23 December 2026, by Paramount Pictures.

== Merchandise ==
The series' cast of fictional characters have been adapted into several forms of merchandise.

=== Toys ===
There have been several toys made from Angry Birds characters. The game's official website offers stuffed plush versions of the birds and pigs for sale, along with T-shirts featuring the game's logo and characters. In May 2011, Mattel released an Angry Birds board game, titled "Angry Birds: Knock on Wood". Over 10 million Angry Birds toys have been sold thus far. Rovio opened the first official Angry Birds retail store in Helsinki on 11 November 2011 at 11:11 a.m. local time. It expects to open its next retail store somewhere in China, considered the game's fastest-growing market. Merchandise has been successful, with 45% of Rovio's revenues in 2012 coming from branded merchandise.

The most notable Angry Birds toy line is Telepods, manufactured by Hasbro. Originally created for Angry Birds Star Wars II, Angry Birds Go!, Angry Birds Stella, and Angry Birds Transformers. Telepods are a series of toys-to-life figures using a similar digital toy hybrid concept as Skylanders or Disney Infinity characters. These are figures used to "teleport" a character of the corresponding figure into the game by scanning a miniature QR code via the device's camera. The Telepod platform technology was invented by ReToy, a bMuse company, in partnership with Hasbro.

In 2012, Mattel produced Hot Wheels cars based on Angry Birds characters: Red, the Blues, Chuck, and a Minion Pig.

In 2016, Lego released six construction sets based on The Angry Birds Movie.

=== Print publications ===
In 2011, Rovio published a cookbook titled Bad Piggies: Egg Recipes which was filled with egg recipes, along with doodle books based on some characters of the game. After a few weeks of the release of Angry Birds Space, they also released Angry Birds Space-themed books about numbers, alphabets, and stickers.

On 20 March 2012, National Geographic published a paperback book titled Angry Birds Space: A Furious Flight Into The Final Frontier shortly before the release of Angry Birds Space which became available on 22 March 2012. National Geographic also has a book titled Angry Birds Feathered Fun for learning all about birds.

In the same year, Rovio created a contest with the prize Angry Birds: Hatching a Universe, a book about the franchise and all the characters. It was released for sale by Titan Books on 24 May 2013; And again by Insight Editions on 4 June 2013. The book was written by Danny Gordon with a foreword by Mikael Hed.

As of 10 March 2014, IDW Publishing announced that they will be publishing Angry Birds Comics starting in June 2014, with Paul Tobin being the writer.

In the summer of 2017, GoComics announced that it would be running a comic strip series based on the world of The Angry Birds Movie, with each issue available to view on its website. The strip ran for over a year, from 3 August 2017 to 20 September 2018.

=== Food products ===
In early 2012, Olvi started to manufacture Angry Birds soft drinks, after licensing with Rovio with two different tastes: Tropic (tropical fruits) and Paradise (pineapple-mandarin). In September 2012 Olvi released two new tastes to the soft drink collection: Lagoon (pear-apple) and Space Comet (orange-cola).

== Parks and attractions ==
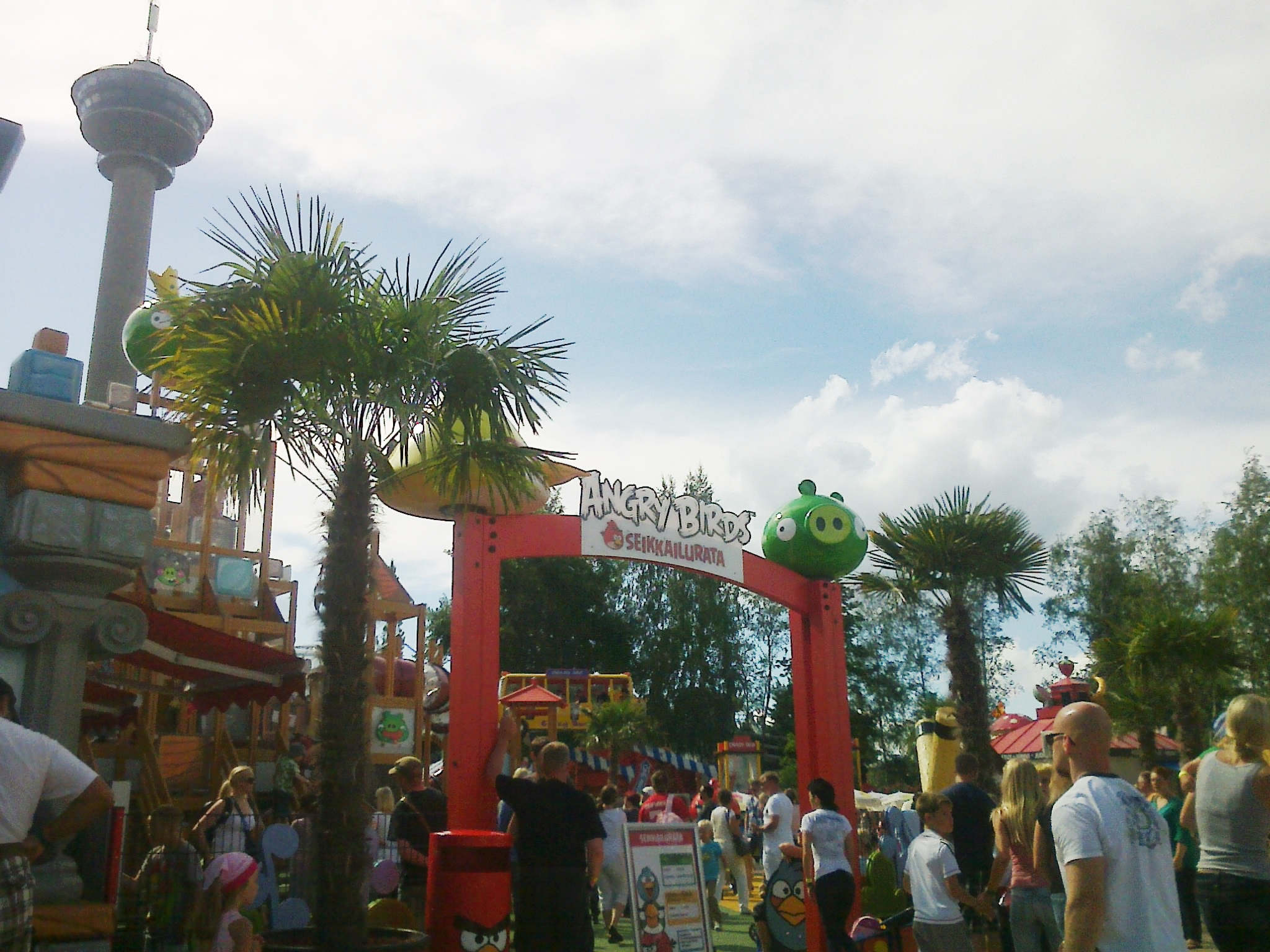
Angry Birds Land in the Särkänniemi amusement park in Tampere, Finland

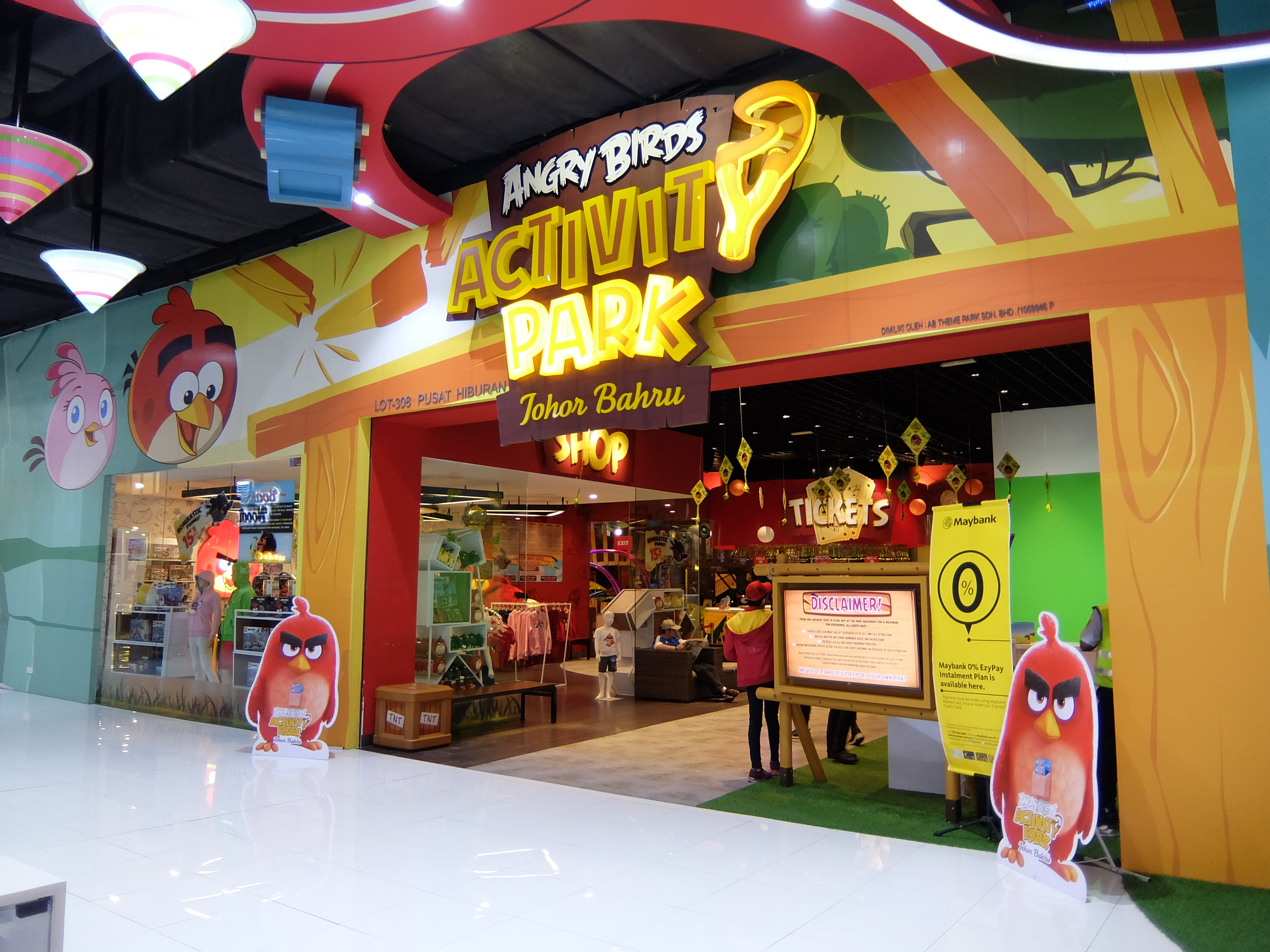
Angry Birds Activity Park in Johor Bahru, Malaysia

=== Angry Birds Land ===
The game's characters have been used, officially or otherwise, in amusement park attractions. In September 2011, the Window of the World theme park in Changsha, China opened an unlicensed Angry Birds attraction. Visitors to the park use a large slingshot to launch stuffed versions of the bird characters at green balloons that represent the pigs.

Upon learning of the attraction, Rovio Entertainment was reported to be considering working with the theme park to officially license it. In March 2012, Rovio announced plans for an official Angry Birds Land, that opened on 28 April 2012, at the Särkänniemi adventure park in Finland. Angry Birds Land opened in May 2014 at Johor Bahru City Centre in Malaysia.

The first Angry Birds themed park in the UK was created in Sundown Adventureland, in the Nottinghamshire countryside.

It was announced that UK theme park Thorpe Park would open their own Angry Birds Land themed area within the park, opening in May 2014, with a 4D cinema showing a 10-minute Angry Birds film with 4D effects, and a slight re-theme of existing drop tower ride Detonator. This Angry Birds Land operated until the end of the 2023 season, being rebranded for the 2024 season.

=== Angry Birds Activity Parks ===
Rovio opened "Activity Parks" of the game. The first one opened in Lightwater Valley, England, with dance floors, playgrounds that include slides, and touchscreen devices for visitors to play Angry Birds. The attraction also opened in Vuokatti, Finland, with obstacle courses and races, and a separate "Angry Birds Town" with kids' cars.

A park opened in Malaysia, but closed after six years on 5 April 2021 due to the COVID-19 pandemic.

=== Angry Birds Space Encounter ===
In June 2013, Rovio and NASA opened the Angry Birds Space Encounter theme park at the Kennedy Space Center. It offers creating characters and shooting birds at pigs, as in the video game. It also opened in the Space Center Houston.

=== Angry Birds World ===
Angry Birds World theme park at Doha Festival City opened in April 2019; the indoor part had opened in June 2018.

=== Angry Birds Not-So-Mini Golf ===
Rovio opened a miniature Angry Birds golf course at American Dream Meadowlands in East Rutherford NJ USA on 1 October 2020.

== Reception ==
Aggregate review scores As of 8 November 2025.
Game	Year	Metacritic	OpenCritic
Angry Birds	2009	iOS: 80; PSP: 77; PC: 60	–
Angry Birds Rio	2011	87	–
Angry Birds Friends	2012	65	–
Angry Birds Space	2012	83	–
Angry Birds Trilogy	2012	3DS: 62; PS3: 66; X360: 63	–
Angry Birds Star Wars	2012	iOS: 88; PS3: 49; X360: 59	49
Angry Birds Star Wars II	2013	77	–
Angry Birds Go!	2013	60	–
Angry Birds Epic	2014	70	–
Angry Birds Transformers	2014	70	–
Angry Birds Fight!	2015	54	–
Angry Birds 2	2015	66	–
Angry Birds Action!	2016	75	–
Angry Birds Blast!	2016	66	–
Angry Birds VR: Isle of Pigs	2019	79	77; 60% recommend
The Angry Birds Movie 2 VR: Under Pressure	2019	70	66; 38% recommend

The first Angry Birds game received critical acclaim for its gameplay and style, and is considered one of the greatest video games ever made, having also been inducted into the World Video Game Hall of Fame.

According to review aggregator website Metacritic, four games in the franchise received a score of 80% and above, while the other games received scores below 60%.

=== Video game sales ===
On Christmas Day 2011 alone, 6.5 million copies of the various Angry Birds games were downloaded across all supported platforms. In 2012, Matt Brian from The Next Web reported that players logged more than 300 million minutes of game time daily across all platforms, with the series having 200 million monthly active users, as of May 2012. By January 2014, the Angry Birds series had reached 4 billion downloads, including Angry Birds, Angry Birds Seasons, Rio, Space, Star Wars, Star Wars II, and Go!

=== Box office performance ===
Film	Year	Box office gross			Budget	Ref.
Film	Year	United States	Other	Worldwide	Budget	Ref.
The Angry Birds Movie	2016	$107,509,366	$244,824,563	$352,333,929	$73 million	
The Angry Birds Movie 2	2019	$41,667,116	$106,124,931	$147,792,047	$65 million	

=== Film accolades ===
Award	Date	Category	Recipient(s)	Result	Ref.
Jussi Awards	March 24, 2017	Best Film	John Cohen, Catherine Winder, Mikael Hed, David Maisel	Nominated	
Hollywood Music in Media Awards	November 17, 2016	Best Original Score – Animated Film	Heitor Pereira, The Angry Birds Movie	Nominated	
Kids' Choice Awards	March 11, 2017	Most Wanted Pet, The Angry Birds Movie	Jason Sudeikis, The Angry Birds Movie	Nominated	
Teen Choice Awards	July 31, 2016	Choice Movie: Hissy Fit, The Angry Birds Movie	Jason Sudeikis, The Angry Birds Movie	Nominated	
Teen Choice Awards	July 31, 2016	Choice Music: Song from a Movie or TV Show	"I Will Survive" by Demi Lovato	Nominated	
People's Choice Awards	November 10, 2019	Family Movie of 2019	The Angry Birds Movie 2	Nominated	
People's Choice Awards	November 10, 2019	Animated Movie Star of 2019	Awkwafina	Nominated	
Nickelodeon Kids' Choice Awards	May 2, 2020	Favorite Animated Movie	The Angry Birds Movie 2	Nominated	
Nickelodeon Kids' Choice Awards	May 2, 2020	Favorite Male Voice for an Animated Movie	Josh Gad (sharing his award with Frozen II), The Angry Birds Movie 2	Won	

== Global impact ==
=== Television ===
The Angry Birds characters have been referenced in television programs throughout the world. The Israeli comedy show Eretz Nehederet (in English: a Wonderful Country), one of the nation's most popular TV programs, satirized recent failed Israeli-Palestinian peace attempts by featuring the Angry Birds in peace negotiations with the pigs. Clips of the segment went viral, getting viewers from all around the world. The sketch received favorable coverage from a variety of independent blogs such as digitaltrends.com, hotair.com and intomobile.com, as well as from online news media agencies such as Haaretz, The Christian Science Monitor, The Guardian, and MSNBC. American television hosts Conan O'Brien, Jon Stewart and Daniel Tosh have referenced the game in comedy sketches on their respective series, Conan, The Daily Show, and Tosh.0. In the 30 Rock episode "Plan B", guest star Aaron Sorkin laments to Liz Lemon, "Our craft is dying while people are playing Angry Birds and poking each other on Facebook". He then provides a tip for Liz to improve her score in the game. In February 2011, American journalist Jake Tapper mockingly introduced U.S. Senator Chris Coons as the "Angry Birds champion of the Senate" during the National Press Club's annual dinner. Some of the game's more notable fans include ex-Prime Minister David Cameron of the United Kingdom, who plays the iPad version of the game, and author Salman Rushdie, who claims he is "something of a master at Angry Birds". Basketball star Kevin Durant is an avid fan of Angry Birds, and regularly plays other NBA stars in matches, although he is wary of cheating. In August 2011, the Milwaukee Brewers played the Angry Birds theme song during the pre-game introductions of the arch-rival St. Louis Cardinals players, in reference to former Cardinals' manager Tony LaRussa's propensity to bean opposing players. Angry Birds also appears briefly, for comic relief, during a scene in the 2013 film G.I. Joe: Retaliation, in which Zartan plays the game while waiting for the world leaders' response to his threats of annihilation. Angry Birds were featured in the 2013 Helsinki episode of Veep. Angry Birds was referenced in the film The Starving Games, a parody of The Hunger Games. A group in the Indian show Dance+ have done a dance based on Angry Birds. Angry Birds was referenced in the Family Guy episode "Turban Cowboy" where one failed skydiving attempt by Peter results in him landing in a level. The TV show Robot Chicken also parodied Angry Birds in one sketch.

A screenshot from the T-Mobile advertisement. The advertisement was shown in Spain by Cosmote.

=== Advertisements ===
Angry Birds and its characters have been featured in advertisements for other products. In March 2011, the characters began appearing in a series of advertisements for Microsoft's Bing search engine. At the 2011 South by Southwest festival in Austin, Texas, Nokia used scrims on a downtown building to project an advertisement for its new N8 handset that included the game's characters. A June 2011 T-Mobile advertisement filmed in Barcelona, Spain included a real-life mock-up of the game in a city plaza, while Nokia used the game in Kuala Lumpur, Malaysia to promote an attempt to set a world record for the largest number of people playing a single mobile game. Finnair has also used Angry Birds in their advertising, including taping an Airbus A340 airliner with the Angry Birds figures and holding an Angry Birds tournament on board a flight to Singapore. Rovio has also prepared a number of web-based promotional variants of Angry Birds themed around creations of other companies, such as Finnish snack company Fazer, Spanish pizza delivery chain Telepizza, and Japanese television network Fuji TV, as well as promotions of American brands including Cheetos, Wonderful Pistachios and Coca-Cola. In November 2013, Indian brand Parle started a marketing campaign in which a trading card is included in each packet of Parle's Wafers and it included a related contest to win Angry Birds merchandise. In February 2016, Cadbury India had Angry Birds small figurines or tattoos in Cadbury Gems packs or Surprise balls. In June 2016, Kurkure India started an offer to win daily themed prizes and a trip to Angry Birds Activity Park in Malaysia.

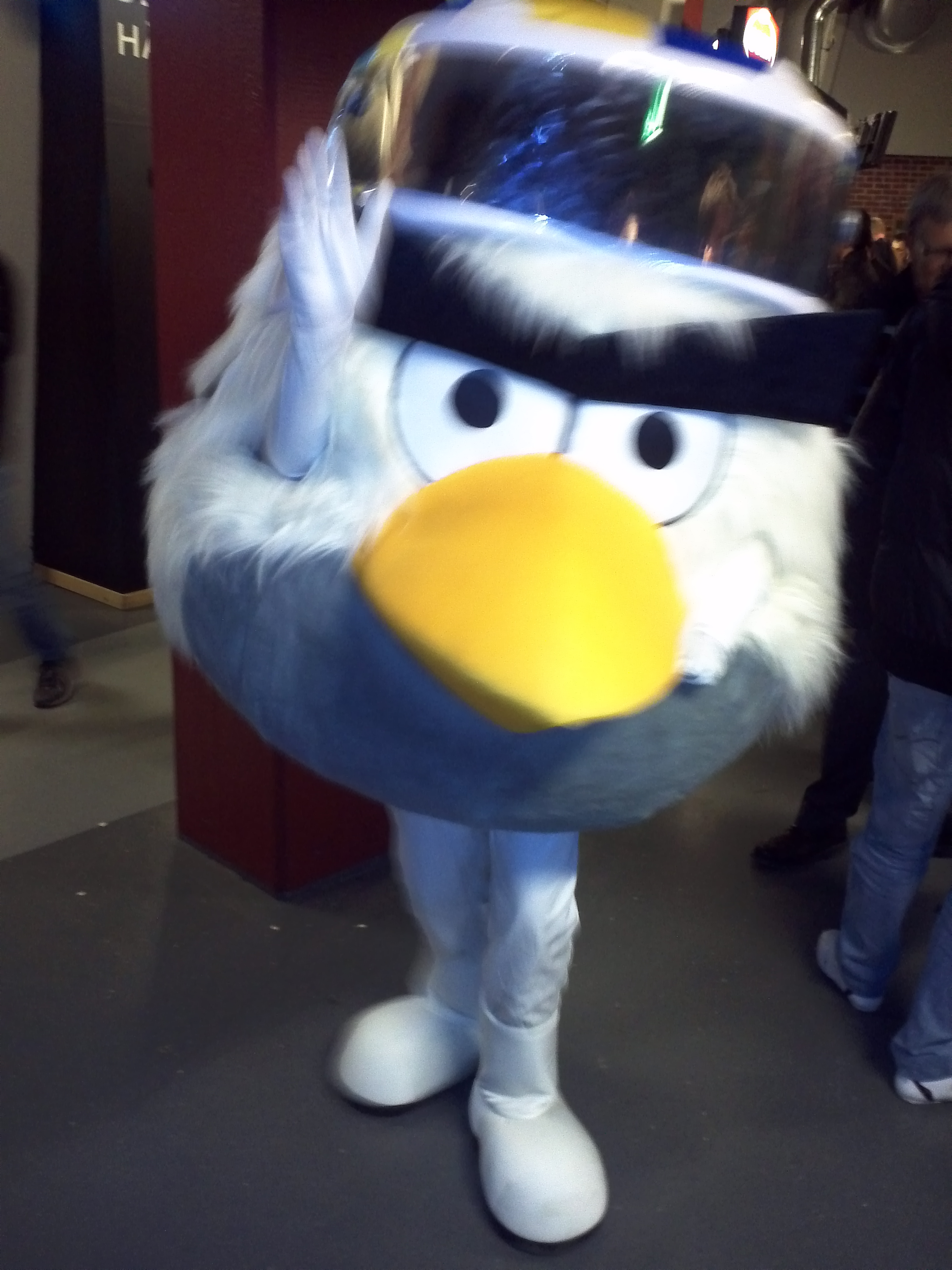
Hockey VM mascot

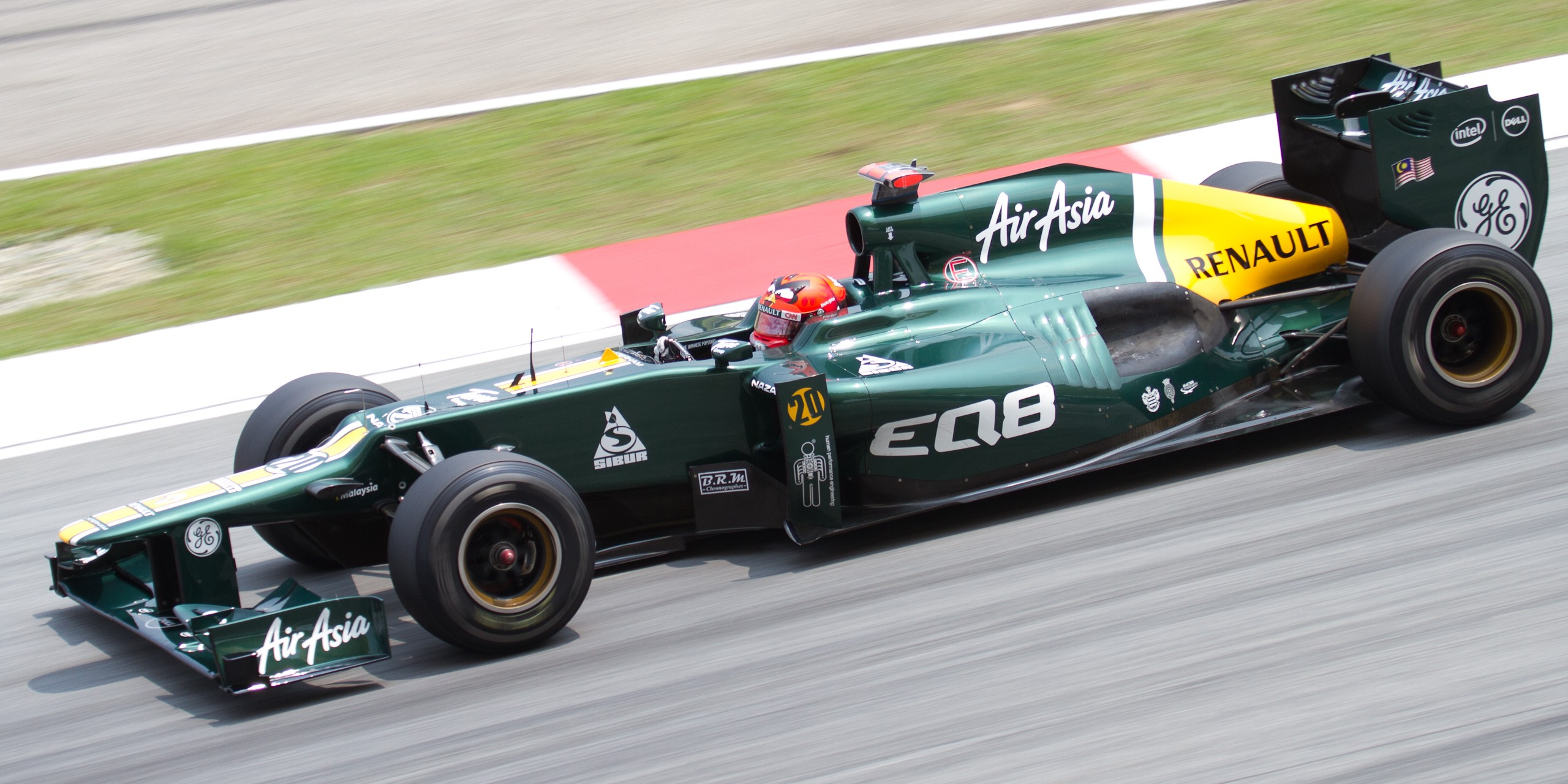
Kovalainen wearing an Angry Birds-themed helmet at the 2012 Malaysian Grand Prix

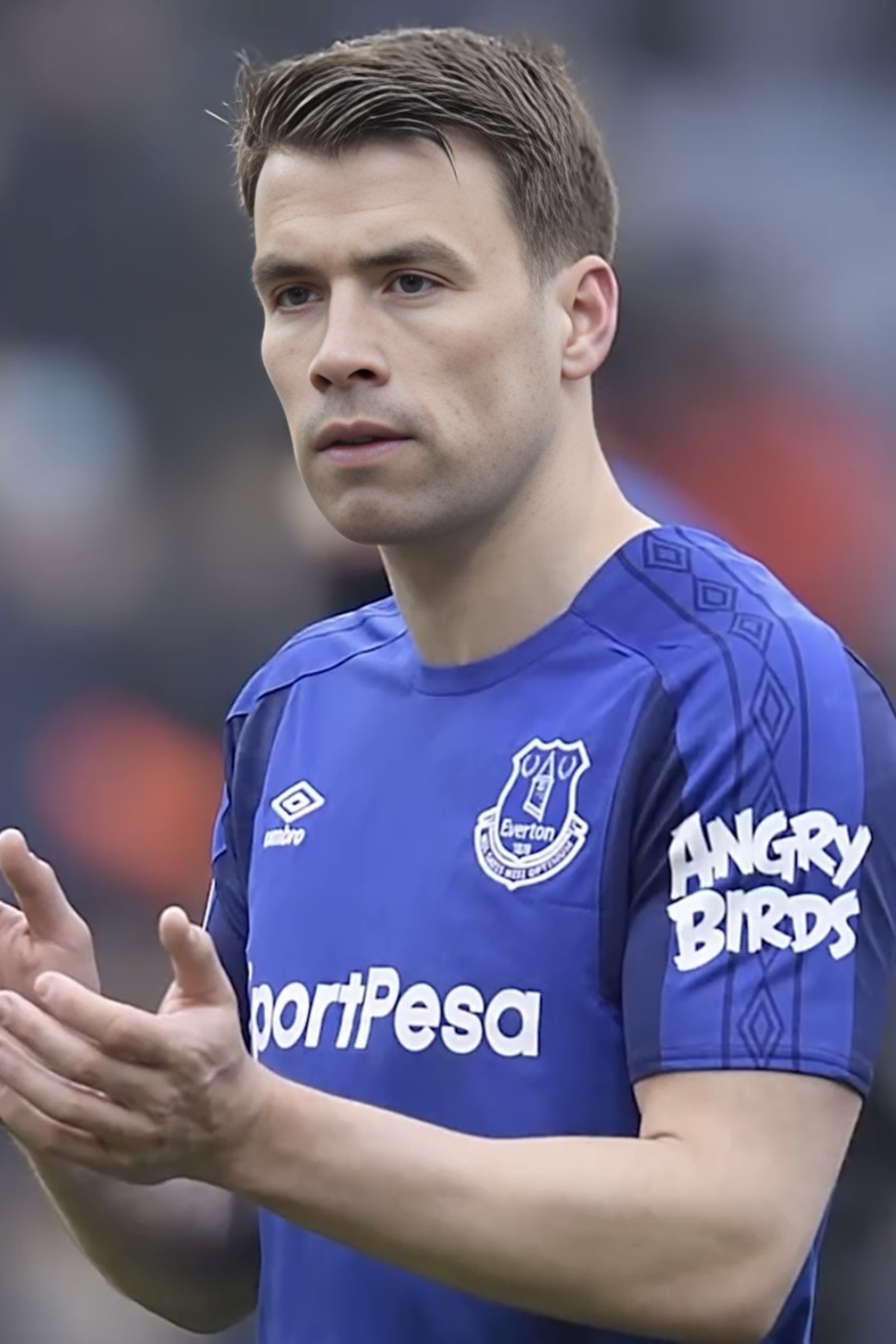
Angry Birds logo on Everton shirt sleeves

Finnish Formula One driver Heikki Kovalainen used an Angry Birds-themed helmet in the 2012 season, following a sponsorship deal with Rovio. Angry Birds also sponsored the Lotus F1 Team that year, with its logo on the top of each Lotus Renault F1 car's nosecone. As part of the deal, fellow Finn Kimi Räikkönen ran an Angry Birds 'Space' logo on his branded caps.

Hockey Bird, an angry hockey playing bird, was the official mascot of the 2012 IIHF Ice Hockey World Championships. It was designed by Toni Kysenius and Rovio Entertainment.

Premier League association football club Everton F.C. signed a deal with Rovio in 2017, whereby the Angry Birds logo appears on the club shirt's left sleeve beginning from the 2017–18 Premier League campaign.

=== Video games ===
The game's popularity has spawned knock-off and parody games that utilize the same basic mechanics as Angry Birds. For example, Angry Turds features monkeys hurling feces and other objects at hunters who have stolen their babies. Another game, titled Chicks'n'Vixens and released in beta form on Windows Phone devices, replaces the birds and pigs with chickens and foxes, respectively. The developer of Chicks'n'Vixens intended the game as a challenge to Rovio Mobile, which stated at the time that a Windows Phone port of Angry Birds would not be ready until later in 2011. The Angry Birds theme song (Balkan Blast Remix) and its characters appear in Just Dance 2016.

=== Religion ===
Angry Birds has inspired works of religious analogy. A five-part essay titled "Angry Birds Yoga — How to Eliminate the Green Pigs in Your Life" was written by Giridhari Dasa of the International Society for Krishna Consciousness of Brazil, utilizing the characters and gameplay mechanics to explain various concepts of yoga in Gaudiya Vaishnavism as understood and interpreted by the Hare Krishna. The piece attracted much media attention, in Brazil and abroad, for its unique method of philosophico-religious presentation. The piece was also recognized and appreciated by Rovio Mobile's Peter Vesterbacka, who was prompted to comment on Twitter, "Very cool! I can see Angry Birds Yoga becoming a worldwide craze;-)".

=== Education ===
Rovio also launched the Angry Birds Playground in partnership with University of Helsinki. Based on the Finnish national curriculum the program covers maths, science, music, language, arts & crafts, physical education and social interaction. Focused on preschoolers of kindergarten age, the program introduced interactive learning material including books, posters, games and digital content. In 2015, a spin-off from the Rovio Angry Birds Playground was established as Fun Academy by co-founder and CEO Sanna Lukander, former Rovio's vice president of learning and book publishing, and co-founder Peter Vesterbacka, former Rovio's 'Mighty Eagle'. Fun Academy is currently present in 9 countries across the world.

== Criticism and controversies ==
=== Generative AI ===
In 2024, Rovio soft launched the puzzle game Angry Birds Block Quest. It received backlash from players, who claimed that it was made with generative AI. Rovio later used generative AI again for an International Women's Day post on X, receiving more negative responses.

=== Leaking user data ===
In January 2014, it was revealed that Angry Birds was considered a "leaky app" and was used to collect data about its users including their sexual orientation and location by the National Security Agency (NSA) and GCHQ. In retaliation, anti-NSA hackers defaced Rovio's website. Claims were made by Edward Snowden that the app was leaky and that they were capable of siphoning data.

According to The Register, the information was leaked through the in-game advertisement code like that embedded by Millennial Media: "Millennial's tracking software generates a personal record for each user that can store information from their political affiliation and sexual orientation to whether their marital state was single, married, divorced, engaged or 'swinger'. This information is used to target in-app ads more effectively, and can be collected by UK and US intelligence agencies for analysis." In a statement to the press, Rovio denied that they were providing any information to the intelligence agencies, but did not exclude the possibility that their advertisers might do so.

Following this revelation, on 29 January, the Angry Birds site was defaced by hackers who replaced it with "Spying Birds" via a DNS hijacking attack. According to Rovio, "The defacement was caught in minutes and corrected immediately". The Syrian Electronic Army tweeted after the incident that the attack had been carried out by "a friend" of theirs.

=== Gaza war ads ===
During the Gaza war, graphic ads supporting Israel showed up in Angry Birds and other video games for children. The Israeli Foreign Ministry said it had instructed advertisers to block the ads for viewers under the age of 18. Rovio subsequently banned the ads manually.

== See also ==
- Boom Blox
