= Lego Overwatch =

Lego theme

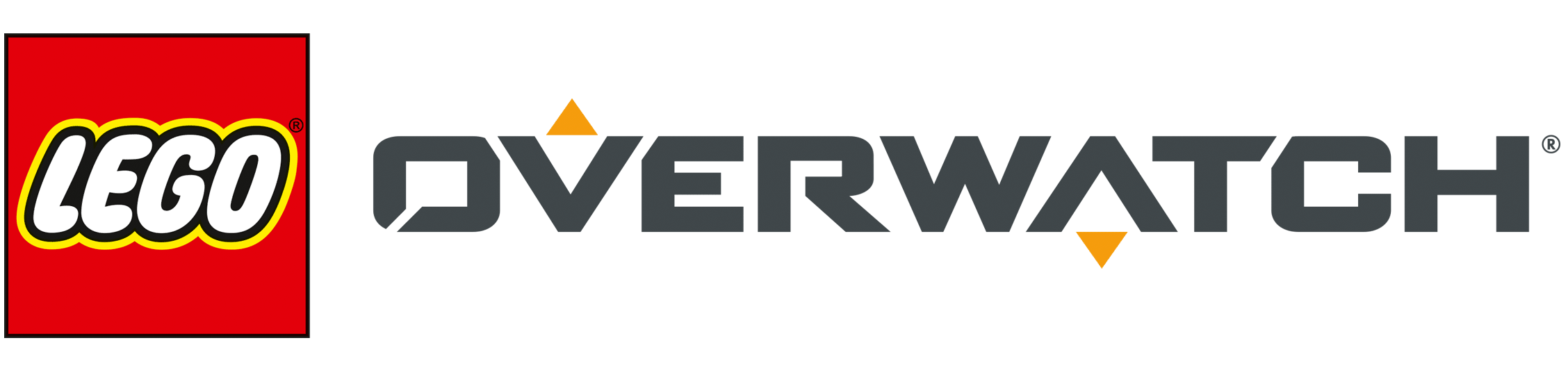
- Subject: Overwatch
- Licensed from: Blizzard Entertainment
- Availability: October 2018–present
- Total sets: 9 (one delayed)
- Characters: Bastion, D.Va, Genji, Hammond, Hanzo, Jesse McCree, Junkrat, Mei, Mercy, Pharah, Reaper, Reinhardt, Roadhog, Shimada Henchmen, Soldier: 76, Tracer, Widowmaker, and Winston
- Official website

Lego Overwatch is a Lego theme based on the video game of the same name. It is licensed from Blizzard Entertainment. The theme was first introduced in October 2018. A set based on the then-upcoming Overwatch 2 was scheduled to be released in February 2022, but has been delayed indefinitely, leaving the theme's return uncertain.

== Overview ==
The Lego Overwatch product line focuses on playable characters from the 2016 video game. Lego Overwatch aimed to recreate the main characters in Lego form, including D.Va, Genji, Hammond, Hanzo, Jesse McCree, Junkrat, Mercy, Pharah, Reaper, Reinhardt, Roadhog, Shimada Henchmen, Soldier: 76, Tracer, Widowmaker and Winston.

In addition, The Lego Group built a life-sized model of D.Va who appears in the video game. The model included D.Va with her mech suit MEKA, representing a scene from the video game. D.Va and MEKA contained a total of 145,276 Lego bricks, and weighed 1,256 pounds. They were placed in front of the BlizzCon. In May 2019, they were also placed in front of the MCM Comic Con London.

In 2018, Lego Designer Chee Woon Tze his current project with his design team is Lego Overwatch, where they designed the Lego Overwatch sets based on the video game.

== Development ==
During the development process of Lego Overwatch theme, Blizzard Vice President of Consumer Products Matt Beecher and Lego Group Designer Woon Tze Chee had discussed the new Lego Overwatch theme. Blizzard Entertainment and The Lego Group worked together to select the Overwatch characters, vehicles and settings that would be turned into the Lego sets. Blizzard Vice President of Consumer Products Matt Beecher explained, "We really spawned a lot of ideas, and we started looking at those through different lenses. The lens of what do we want to deliver for the fan experience? The lens of playability. There's a lot of research that LEGO team did in trying to understand which play sets come together the best for the audiences. And through collaboration we ultimately got to the six play sets that we announced here." Lego Group Designer Woon Tze Chee explained, "We're hitting a different age group than we're usually targeting, a little bit higher age mark, we spent quite a fair bit of time trying to strike a balance between a set that has play features, versus a cool model that they can just display. With older children, they might not want to play with the model that much, but they find it cool and they might want to build it and display it." The product line does, however, include recognisable characters from Overwatch video game.

In June 2019, Lego Group Designer Woon Tze Chee discussed how the Lego Overwatch theme was developed and explained, "Some of these sets are inspired by the animation, some of the sets are inspired by the game mode, this has something to do with the composition of the team. Pharmacy combo is a composition of the team that is popular among fans. We definitely tried to keep the conflict in each set so that it is a good play starter for anyone who doesn't know much about the story, you have a few opposing characters you can make some conflict with."

In July 2019, Lego Group Designer Woon Tze Chee discussed how did the new weapon piece come about and explained, "We made a blaster in general for the whole project so that we can build the different weapons in the game. These are as iconic as the characters themselves. For the blaster, again it is a general element and other projects can use them, but we developed it with this project in mind first. The element designers studied the art style of the weapons in the game: how they would depict the futuristic look of the weapons. They try to create one that is generic across all the weapons that they have, with the intention of making this element that is able to use eventually build all the weapons of the game: the starting point is this element."

== Launch ==
Lego Overwatch theme was launched at the American International Toy Fair in 2019. As part of the marketing campaign, The Lego Group released toy sets based on the video game and featured mech suits, vehicles, spacecraft and combat robots. Minifigures were released as well, including one depicting Tracer is the first Lego minifigure to be revealed. In UK, Lego Overwatch was launched in New Year.

== Construction sets ==
According to BrickLink, The Lego Group released 10 playsets and promotional pack based on the Lego Overwatch theme.

=== Lego Overwatch sets ===
In 2018, it was announced that the limited-edition of Omnic Bastion (set number: 75974) was released as an exclusive promo set only available at Blizzard's online shop and BlizzCon in October 2018. The set consists of 182 pieces and based on the "Omnic Crisis" in orange version from the video game.

In October 2018, it was officially announced by The Lego Group that the first wave sets that based on the Overwatch video game was released on 3 January 2019. The six sets being released were Tracer vs. Widowmaker (set number: 75970), Hanzo vs. Genji (set number: 75971), Dorado Showdown (set number: 75972), D.Va & Reinhardt (set number: 75973), Bastion (set number: 75974) (Note: Bastion was also the first character to be made available in Lego form through official collaboration between Blizzard and The Lego Group. A limited-time event in 2019 allowed players the opportunity to earn a Bastion skin based on the Lego version.) and Watchpoint: Gibraltar (set number: 75975). Lego Model Designer Woon Tze Chee discussed about the Tracer vs. Widowmaker (set number: 75970) combine with Watchpoint: Gibraltar (set number: 75975) and explained, "I think that idea came up quite early. I think there was a few ideas that started off with this set, so we wanted to make a small price point so we know there are probably two minifigures in there. It kind of generated from this one – wouldn't it be cool if the first one connects with the last one? Then you can play out the story, move the payload right to the end and it connects to it. It is a very fluid sort of process."

Later, it also announced that the second wave sets was released on 2 October 2019. The two sets being released were Wrecking Ball (set number: 75976) and Junkrat & Roadhog (set number: 75977). The sets were designed primarily for children with an age rating of 8+ or above. In October 2020, The Lego Group announced all sets were to be retired on 31 December 2020.

=== Future ===
In December 2021, The Lego Group had revealed a new set named Titan (set number: 76980) would be released in February 2022 based on the game's sequel Overwatch 2. The set consisted of 901 pieces with 2 minifigures of Tracer and Mei. However, in January 2022, The Lego Group announced that it would delay the set indefinitely while it reviews its partnership with Activision Blizzard, following the workplace misconduct lawsuit by the California Department of Fair Employment and Housing (DFEH). As of May 2023, there has been no word from The Lego Group on when or if the set will be released, leaving the theme's return uncertain.

== Web shorts ==
The product line was accompanied by a series of animated short films that was released on YouTube.

- How Heroes Play Tribute Video is an official web short was released on YouTube on 20 February 2019 that inspired by both Lego toyline as well as the Overwatch video game. It features gamers playing Overwatch video game, with their Lego models sat on the desk alongside them. As they engage with the game, the Lego builds come to life and start having their own adventure.
- Wrecking Ball chasing Junkrat & Roadhog inside Junkertown is an official web short was released on YouTube on 5 December 2019, that inspired by both Lego toyline as well as the Overwatch video game. It features Wrecking Ball chasing after the Junkrat and Roadhog inside Junkertown.

== Reception ==
In 2020, Junkrat & Roadhog (set number: 75977) was listed as one of the "LEGO Christmas 2020 gift list for gamers" by Lego fansite Brick Fanatics.

== See also ==
- Overwatch animated media
- Overwatch Contenders
- Overwatch League
- Lego Avatar
- Lego Ninjago
- Lego Legends of Chima
- Nexo Knights
- Lego Monkie Kid
- Lego Exo-Force
- Lego The Angry Birds Movie
- Lego Minecraft
- Lego Super Mario
- Lego Sonic the Hedgehog
