= Angry Birds Star Wars II =

2013 video game

- The splash screen
- Developer: Rovio Entertainment
- Publisher: Rovio Entertainment
- Series: Angry Birds
- Engine: Box2D
- Platforms: Android iOS; Windows Phone 8
- Release: September 19, 2013
- Genre: Puzzle
- Mode: Single-player

Angry Birds Star Wars II (also formatted as Angry Birds Star Wars 2) is a 2013 puzzle video game developed and published by Rovio Entertainment. The successor to Angry Birds Star Wars (2012), it is a crossover between the Angry Birds video game series and the Star Wars prequel trilogy. It continues the gameplay of previous Angry Birds games with Star Wars theming, locations, and characters. It introduces the ability to play as the pigs in the same fashion as the birds as well as toys-to-life functionality. Angry Birds Star Wars II was released for mobile devices worldwide on September 19, 2013, and was met with a generally positive response from critics. Additional content was added throughout 2014.

== Gameplay ==
Angry Birds Star Wars II allows players to play as the pigs identically to the birds.

Angry Birds Star Wars II follows the gameplay of its predecessor, Angry Birds Star Wars, as well as previous Angry Birds games; the player launches their characters to defeat all the enemies present in each level. Based on the Star Wars prequel trilogy, it includes over 30 characters from the films, with levels being set in Star Wars locations such as Naboo and Tatooine.

Star Wars II is the first main entry in the Angry Birds series in which the player can play as the pigs, who represent Sith characters (referred to as the "Pork Side") such as Jango Fett, Darth Maul, and Darth Sidious. The Sith pigs play identically to the birds, each having their own abilities that are activated upon tapping the touchscreen. Other represented characters include Anakin Skywalker, Jar Jar Binks, Ewan McGregor's portrayal of Obi-Wan Kenobi, Qui-Gon Jinn, and Mace Windu. (Note: Attributed to multiple sources:) Characters from the original trilogy such as Boba Fett, Chewbacca, Darth Vader, Luke Skywalker, Yoda, and the Stormtroopers also appear. Virtual currency can be earned by completing achievements and spent on additional characters either individually or in bundles.

Star Wars II is the first game in the Angry Birds series to be compatible with Telepods, a line of toys-to-life figures by Hasbro. Telepods can be "teleported" into the game via small QR codes by placing a figure on top of a plastic base, which has a magnifying glass and in turn goes on the device's front camera.

== Release ==
Angry Birds Star Wars II was revealed by Rovio Entertainment on July 15, 2013. It was released worldwide for Android, iOS, and Windows Phone 8 on September 19, 2013, with the Android version being free-to-play. The Telepods toys were showcased at San Diego Comic-Con and released a week earlier than the game on September 13. The game's release was accompanied by several pieces of merchandise, including a book published by National Geographic on September 17.

Additional content was added post-launch via updates. Levels set on the planets Kamino and Coruscant were added in the "Rise of the Clones" update on May 29, 2014. An additional 32 levels set on Geonosis and Mustafar were added in the "Revenge of the Pork" update on December 4.

== Reception ==
Reception

Aggregate score
Aggregator	Score
Metacritic	77/100

Review scores
Publication	Score
CNET Gamecenter	8.6/10
Destructoid	8/10
EP Daily	8/10, 6.5/10
Game Informer	7.5/10
IGN	8.6/10
MacLife	3/5
Pocket Gamer	7/10
The Guardian	5/5
TouchArcade	5/5
Common Sense Media	3/5
Digital Spy	3/5

Award
Publication	Award
Pocket Gamer	Bronze Award

At the 2014 Kids' Choice Awards, Angry Birds Star Wars II received a nomination for Favorite App Game. The game's critical response was also favourable. Its average from review aggregator website Metacritic was 77 out of 100, based on 24 reviews, including 5 out of 5 scores from TouchArcade and The Guardian. Criticism in the review from the latter newspaper was limited to the lack of save data synchronization between the iPad and iPhone.

Several critics considered the gameplay fun despite its faults. As with its predecessor, Angry Birds Star Wars II was acclaimed for its incorporation of the Star Wars license. The birds' new Jedi abilities were well-received for making the gameplay diverse and interesting. (Note: Attributed to multiple sources:) Common highlights included the pod racing sequences and the Jar Jar Binks bird; the latter was favoured by Justin Davis from IGN and Harry Slater from Pocket Gamer. Andrew Reiner, writing for Game Informer, considered the game's version of Jar Jar to be "a more interesting and dynamic character" than Darth Maul.

The core game formula was found to be largely unchanged, (Note: Attributed to multiple sources:) so Chris Morris for Common Sense Media and Chris Carter for Destructoid suggested a gamer's potential enjoyment would be dependent on that of the rest of the Angry Birds franchise. While Jason Parker from CNET was still entertained despite the similarity, Digital Spy's Scott Nichols and Pocket Gamer's Harry Slater criticized Rovio for playing it safe. When it came to the "Pork Side" levels, Eli Hodapp from TouchArcade suggested the "on-tap power" was a good spin on the gameplay that fit the pigs. Conversely, Destructoid's Carter was disappointed about the pigs, having initially expected them to function and act much more differently from the birds.

Several critics were let down by the significant decrease in difficulty compared to other Angry Birds games, which was a consequence of the utilization of Jedi abilities and structures with blatant weak spots. (Note: Attributed to multiple sources:) Chad Sapieha from the Financial Post considered using the additional characters to be "cheating". Most of the levels were reportedly beaten in just over an hour. Critics reported the game was still playable, if challenging, without the in-app-purchased and Telepods characters. (Note: Attributed to multiple sources:) However, sources such as The Electric Playground was critical of this system, arguing the Telepods in particular turned Angry Birds Star Wars II into a toy commercial. (Note: Attributed to multiple sources:)
