= Angry Birds Seasons =

2010 video game

- Final iteration of the app icon
- Developer: Rovio Entertainment
- Publisher: Rovio Entertainment
- Composers: Ari Pulkkinen; Ilmari Hakkola; Salla Hakkola; Alexander Roder; Henri Sorvali; Douglas Black Heaton
- Series: Angry Birds
- Engine: Box2D
- Platforms: iOS, Android, Symbian, webOS, Microsoft Windows, OS X, Windows Phone, BlackBerry 10, BlackBerry Tablet OS
- Release: iOS; October 21, 2010; Android; December 1, 2010
- Genre: Puzzle
- Mode: Single-player

Angry Birds Seasons (formerly Angry Birds Halloween) is a 2010 puzzle video game developed and published by Rovio Entertainment. It is the second game in the Angry Birds series. It is based on Angry Birds (2009), albeit themed around numerous seasons and holidays. Angry Birds Seasons was released for iOS devices in October 2010, and later on Android devices in December 2010. The game got its final update on December 1, 2016 and, three years later in 2019, would be removed from the App Store and Google Play.

Angry Birds Seasons was generally well received, with critics praising the game's seasons, while others criticized the game's steeper difficulty when compared to Angry Birds.

== Gameplay ==
Just as in the original Angry Birds, players use a slingshot to launch an assortment of birds at nearby structures, with the intent of hitting targets located on or within them. The main targets are the pigs, and they can be defeated if directly fired at, or through other strategies, e.g.: the bird hits a structure that falls on the pig, defeating it. Small sized pigs are weak and easily defeated, while bigger pigs can sustain more damage. The game contains 29 different episodes, with each representing a different "season," often based upon different themes and holidays. Different episodes have each unique theme and sometimes much different gameplay. On October 21, 2015, the game got a major update for its 5th anniversary. This added a new currency known as birdcoins which drastically impacted how the game was played. Each episode released from "Trick Or Treat" to "South Hamerica" would be locked behind a birdcoin paywall. Players could earn birdcoins by completing levels or by spending real money. This update also added the "Quests" mechanic where each day the player would be given 3 tasks and, if they were completed, they would be rewarded birdcoins or a Power-Up. Additionally, the player can also get given a 3 part quest where they will be given one each day for three days and, if all three are completed, the player will unlock a new costume for a bird, known as "Birdwear."

The game features 29 episodes, which were added as the game's lifespan went on between 2010 and 2016. The first one, Trick or Treat, was released on October 21, 2010, and the last one, Ragnahog, was released on December 1, 2016. Different worlds have their own gimmicks, for example, "Haunted Hogs" from the 2012 season featured ghost blocks which birds cannot make contact with and instead, phase through.

The game features all of the previous games' birds, Red, Chuck, The Blues, Bomb, Matilda, Terence, Hal, Bubbles, and Stella. A new bird called Tony, who was revealed to be the cousin of Terence, was introduced in this game, who acts similar to Silver; a bird introduced in Angry Birds 2. Tony will slam down and smash anything beneath him when the screen is tapped.

== Release ==
Rovio continued to support Angry Birds Seasons with regular updates after the initial release, with the final update being released in December 2016.

=== Season 2010 (2010) ===
Season 2010 began in October 2010, when Rovio released a Halloween edition. Angry Birds Halloween, exclusive to iOS at the time and a separate game, included levels with Halloween-themed music and graphics. On December 1, 2010, Rovio changed the name to Angry Birds Seasons to iOS, Android, and Symbian 3 devices. Seasons introduced 25 Christmas-themed levels, one for each day leading to the holiday, similar to an Advent calendar. All versions include the previously exclusive Halloween levels and are offered as separate, stand-alone paid applications, with the exception of the free, ad-supported Android version; Angry Birds Halloween users on iOS received the Seasons levels as a free upgrade. The Halloween version was given the episode title "Trick or Treat", while the Christmas episode was entitled "Season's Greedings".

=== Season 1 (2011) ===
Season 1 started In February 2011, when Rovio released a Valentine's Day update to Angry Birds Seasons, entitled "Hogs and Kisses", complete with new themed levels and graphics, as well as the option to send Angry Birds-themed Valentine's Day messages through Facebook. In March 2011, Rovio released a new St. Patrick's Day update, entitled "Go Green, Get Lucky;" followed by an Easter update, entitled "Easter Eggs", in April 2011; and a summer update, "Summer Pignic", in June 2011, which would be the only non-Christmas episode to feature an Advent calendar layout. In September 2011, "Moon Festival" was released in conjunction with the Chinese Mid-Autumn Festival. October 2011 is when the second Halloween update, "Ham'O'Ween", released and introduced a new orange bird, known as Bubbles. In December 2011, "Wreck the Halls" was released with 25 Christmas-themed levels also arranged in an Advent calendar layout.

=== Season 2 (2012) ===
Season 2 would begin in January of said year, when "Year of the Dragon" was released; it was themed around Chinese New Year. It features the replacement of the Mighty Eagle, the Mighty Dragon, that loops out the structures and defeats all the pigs; it is free to use. A Japanese Cherry Blossom episode was announced on February 28, 2012, with a release date on March 7, 2012. In June 2012, Angry Birds Seasons added their twelfth episode, Piglantis. It was launched on June 14 and is the second summer based episode (the first episode being Summer Pignic). The main new feature in Angry Birds: Piglantis is fluid physics: the birds, wood, and glass are buoyant in the water levels; however, the pigs and stone are too heavy to rise to the surface and sink down until they are defeated. In August 2012, "Back to School" was added, which introduces the pink bird, Stella and it's Back To School Day. October 2012 is when the third Halloween themed episode, "Haunted Hogs," was released. It added ghost blocks, which are visible to all items except the birds and the pigs unless they are inside them. On December 1, Winter Wonderham was released and was the third Christmas episode in the series. Like the other Christmas episodes, it is set up as an advent calendar. It introduced slippery blue ice, that makes wood, ice, stone, birds, and pigs slip on contact. Interestingly, if the player was playing on an Android device and clicked level 5 of this episode, they would be greeted to a special blue Intel Golden Egg, made to tie in with the then new web game, Angry Birds In: Ultrabook Adventure. The golden egg contained 5 exclusive levels, and would be removed in 2016.

=== Season 3 (2013) ===
Season 3 would begin far later into the year than usual, with the episode Abra-Ca-Bacon based on World Circus Day released in May 2013. It has a magician theme and features a new level mechanic known as "magic portals", which can teleport materials, birds, or pigs from one portal to another. December 2013 would see the release of the fourth Christmas themed episode, Arctic Eggspedition. It was once again set up as an advent calendar with one level unlocked per day. This is the shortest season in the game's history, with only two episodes.

=== Season 4 (2014) ===
Season 4 would debut at even later date into the year than the last, in July 2014. This introduced a third summer-themed episode, South Hamerica and Pig Days, an episode that has weekly unlocked levels. On October 9, 2014, the game got updated with "Ham Dunk", in celebration of the NBA Championships. On October 27, 2014, the Visit Finland Twitter account unveiled an image displaying Terence swimming on a pool along a similar looking bird, colored blue. This bird would later to be revealed to be the cousin of Terence, named "Tony." This Tweet hinted at the next update to the game, which would end up being known as "On Finn Ice" and would be released on December 1, 2014. This episode would feature the after mentioned Tony as a brand new playable character who had the ability of crashing down directly below him when the screen was tapped. The band, Apocalyptica, would also make the theme used in this update, which was a remix of the original Angry Birds theme. With this update, the episodes were arranged to the year they were released, not as it was previously; for example, the "Ham'o'ween" episode and the "Wreck the Halls" episode, which were in the third season (Season 2), were moved to the second season (Season 1), as the two episodes were released in 2011, the "Haunted Hogs" episode and the "Winter Wonderham" episode, which were in the fourth season (Season 3), were moved to the third season (Season 2), as the two episodes were released in 2012, the "Arctic Eggspedition" episode, which was in the fifth season (Season 4), was moved to the fourth season (Season 3), as the episode was released in 2013.

=== Season 5 (2015) ===
Season 5 began in February 2015, a second part of Ham Dunk was added as All-Star Weekend 2015, expanding the episode to 60 levels (more than Trick or Treat, which has 45). This update allowed the player to use Shockwave (electrical Bomb) for free, but only in Ham Dunk and for a limited time. In April 2015, the episode known as "Tropigal Paradise" was released. This was added in commemoration of Rovio's partnership with BirdLife International to save the birds of the Pacific. About a month later (June), a third Ham Dunk update, celebrating The Finals, was added- ultimately expanding the total levels of Ham Dunk to 67. In October 2015, The fourth Halloween episode, "Invasion Of The Egg Snatchers" would be released. It was themed around 50's horror movies. This episode would also bring in BirdWear (costumes), which are unlocked in a scavenger hunt style, having the player search through levels they completed for certain items, and once 3 items were found (there is a 16-hour wait between obtaining items and an eight-hour wait to get a new mission), they would receive the costume, allowing the birds to (optionally) wear outfits during gameplay. Another new feature in the update was the Power-Up Test Zone, which lets the player test Power-Ups (with infinite uses). Finally, to wrap up 2015 to end with a Christmas episode, "Ski or Squeal" was added (in the usual advent calendar style), taking place a top a frigid mountain summit.

=== Season 6 (2016) ===
Season 6 began on February 11, 2016, a Valentine's Day episode was released, entitled "Fairy Hogmother", which is set in a fairytale storybook, featuring magic wands that trigger actions when hit, and imprisoned Birds that give the player an extra Bird when the cage is destroyed. As spring rolled around about a month later, a new episode was released, called "Marie Hamtionette", in celebration of the Versailles Festival (after Marie Antoinette, queen of France in the 1700s). In June 2016, the summer-themed episode entitled "Summer Camp", would be released. Its setting was a summer camp set in a mountainous forest at dawn. This update also added a new mode, "The Pig Challenge", which is set in a tournament style format, having players compete against friends and other players in a randomized set of weekly levels for trophies and power-ups. August 2016 would be when "Piggywood Studios Part 1" released. Its theme involved around the Pigs re-enacting famous movie scenes from Indiana Jones, King Kong, The Angry Birds Movie, Aliens, Back to the Future, and more.Its sequel episode, "Piggywood Studios Part 2" would be released a month later. the Halloween episode "Hammier Things", which was a parody of the Netflix series Stranger Things, would be released in October as the game's fifth and final Halloween themed episode. The year, and the game as a whole, concluded with the seventh Christmas episode "Ragnahog", which had a Viking theming.

== Ports ==
At E3 2012 in Los Angeles, Rovio and distribution partner Activision announced plans to bring Angry Birds Seasons, along with the original Angry Birds and Angry Birds Rio, to the PlayStation 3, Xbox 360, and Nintendo 3DS systems. Bundled together as Angry Birds Trilogy, the games were built specifically for their respective consoles, taking advantage of their unique features. Additional versions of Trilogy for the Wii, Wii U and PlayStation Vita were released in 2013.

== Reception ==
Reception

Aggregate score
Aggregator	Score
Metacritic	iOS (HD): 78/100

The reception of Angry Birds Seasons has been positive. Tracy Erickson of Pocket Gamer wrote about the original version, "the difficulty is steeper than in the original Angry Birds, which is likely an intentional consideration for those well-versed in the first game. This doesn't make Angry Birds Halloween unapproachable, but it does result in an undesirable increase in trial-and-error gameplay. Without the experience of playing the original, you can anticipate having to replay a lot of stages." He further mentioned, "Of course, these structural issues don't detract from what remains an entertaining game. Angry Birds Halloween is pleasantly more of the same, though you're best served by playing the original before tackling this holiday treat." Sarah Jacobsson of Macworld said about the Christmas update, "Unlike the original Angry Birds and Angry Birds Halloween, the Season's Greetings track does not start out with a laughably easy level—after all, you only get one level a day, and Rovio wants to make you work for it." She further wrote, "Angry Birds Seasons brings fun, Christmas spirit to the most popular iOS game of the year. With the included Halloween track, you get a total of 69 challenging levels—definitely worth $0.99 (Angry Birds Seasons HD is $1.99)."

== See also ==
- List of most downloaded Android applications
