= Sundown Adventureland =

Children's theme park in Rampto, Nottinghamshire, England

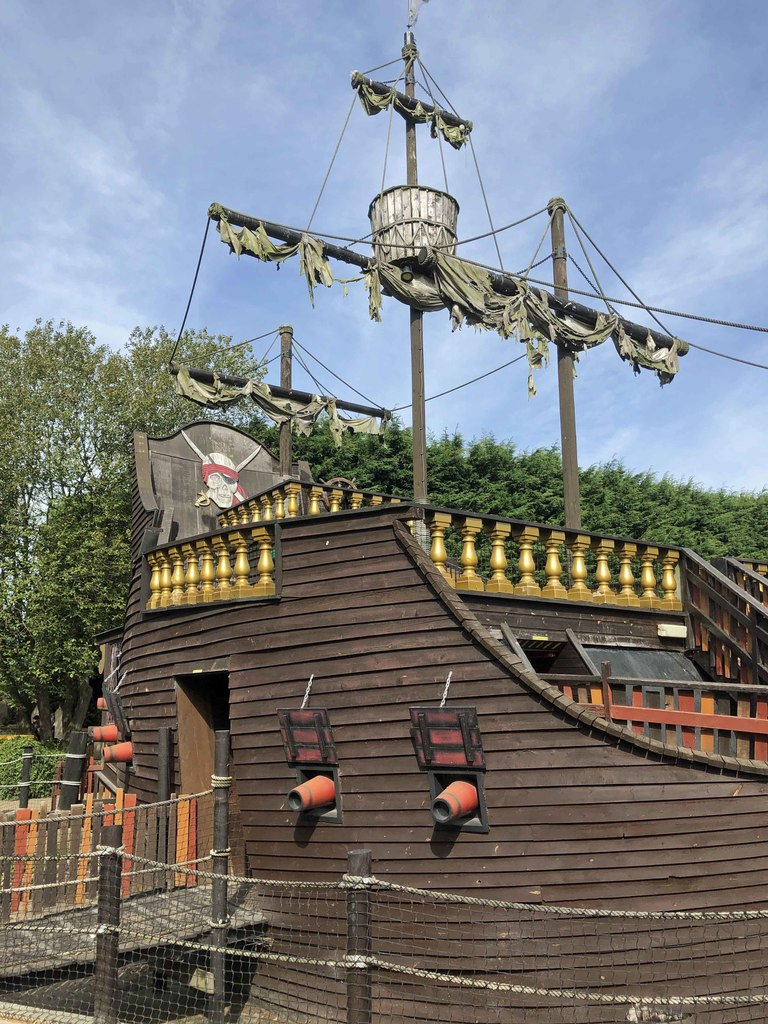
- Pirate ship at Sundown Adventureland
- Interactive map of Sundown Adventureland
- Location: Rampton, Nottinghamshire, England
- Coordinates: 53.3040°N 0.8125°W
- Opened: 26 May 1968
- Owner: Rhodes Family
- Slogan: The Theme Park For The Under 10's
- Operating season: February – December
- Website: sundownadventureland.co.uk

Sundown Adventureland is a children's theme park in Rampton, Nottinghamshire, UK. It originally opened as a farmyard in 1968 and is owned by the Rhodes family. As of 2020, it has over 30 rides and attractions.

== Park guide ==
The park has several themed areas, including fantasy, Wild West, pirate and fairytale themes.

The park has a number of rides aimed at young children, as well as walkthrough attractions, most of which being interactive through pressing buttons that have visual and audio consequences. In addition, there are also has some themed outdoor play areas.

It has three main dining locations: Honey's Pumpkin Patch Café, Crash Landings and Rodeo Corral. The latter two both contain themed soft play areas.

Attraction	Date Opened	Date Closed	Description
Giddy Piggies			A small children's round ride.
Jolly Pirate Boat Ride	1992		A themed boat ride. Previously named the Boozy Barrel Boat Ride.
Monkey Mayhem Driving School	2018		A themed children's driving ride.
The Okie Yolkie Ride			A teacups-style round ride.
Wild Ostrich Safari Ride	2017		A tracked ride.
Robin Hood's Merry Adventure			A Medieval themed dark ride.
Rocky Mountain Railroad	1993		A themed train ride.
Santa's Sleigh Ride	1995		A Christmas themed dark ride.
The Night Before Christmas			A second Christmas themed dark ride.
Tractor Ride			A children's tractor car ride.
Lollipoppet Castle	2000		A walk-through castle themed to sweets.
Market Square			An interactive walk-through attraction.
Singing Pet Shop			Animated walk-through.
Storybook Village			Walk-through based on fairytale houses.
Sunnydown Farm			Animated walk-through about farm animals.
Toy Town			Walk-through attraction.
Shotgun City			Western themed town.
Monkey Mischief			Interactive walk-through.
The Great Crazy Critter Bonanza	1987	2008	Animated show featuring animals singing country songs, formerly in Shotgun City. Produced by Golding Leisure Design. It was replaced in 2009 by the Buck & Duke animated show.
Angry Birds Activity Park	2012		A themed play area.
Fort Apache			A themed play area.
Crash Landings			A themed indoor play area.
Rodeo Corral			A themed indoor play area.

== History ==
Sundown Adventureland first opened in 1968 and was run in the Rhodes' back garden. In its first year open, it was visited by over 2000 people. Animals that could be seen during early operation included pheasants, ducks, bush babies, flying and red squirrels, budgerigars, canaries, a monkey, fox and a donkey. It was originally known as Sundown Pets Corner.

== Awards ==
In 2020 Sundown Adventureland was voted the fourth-best theme park in the UK and the 16th best in Europe, according to TripAdvisor
