= Angry Birds Star Wars =

2012 video game

- App icon
- Developers: Rovio Entertainment; Exient
- Publisher: Rovio Entertainment (Note: Activision published the console and handheld ports.)
- Director: Jaakko Iisalo
- Producer: Maxime Loppin
- Designer: Kimmo Sorsamo
- Composer: Salla Hakkola
- Series: Angry Birds
- Engine: Box2D
- Platforms: List: Android; iOS; Kindle Fire; OS X; Windows; Windows Phone; Nintendo 3DS; PlayStation 3; PlayStation Vita; Wii; Wii U; Xbox 360; PlayStation 4; Xbox One
- Release: Mobile, PC; WW: November 8, 2012; 3DS, PS3, Vita, Wii, Wii U, X360; WW: October 29, 2013; PS4, XOne; NA: October 29, 2013; WW: November 1, 2013
- Genre: Puzzle
- Modes: Single-player, multiplayer

Angry Birds Star Wars is a 2012 puzzle video game developed and published by Rovio Entertainment in conjunction with Lucasfilm. It is an installment in the Angry Birds series and a crossover with the Star Wars franchise; it combines gameplay from previous Angry Birds games with elements from the original trilogy of Star Wars films, with several Angry Birds characters portraying Star Wars characters.

A crossover between Angry Birds and Star Wars was conceived during development of the previous Angry Birds game, Angry Birds Space, when its developers experimented with content based on science fiction franchises. Lucasfilm was Rovio's first choice for companies to collaborate with, and the project went from a patch update to a full game. It first released for mobile devices and personal computers on November 8, 2012, before being ported to home video game consoles and handheld game consoles by Activision in late 2013. The mobile version was praised by critics, considered one of the best mobile games, and was downloaded over 100 million times, whereas the console ports received negative criticism. A successor based on the Star Wars prequel trilogy, titled Angry Birds Star Wars II, was released in 2013.

== Gameplay ==
A level set in Cloud City from The Empire Strikes Back (1980)

Angry Birds Star Wars is alike the previous Angry Birds titles—in a two-dimensional perspective, players eliminate pigs by launching birds from a slingshot into destructible structures—albeit with Star Wars theming and alterations similar to Angry Birds Space (2012). Based on the original Star Wars trilogy, levels are set in locations from the films—Tatooine, the Death Star, Dagobah, Hoth, and Cloud City—and use gravitational fields previously seen in Angry Birds Space.

The playable birds represent Star Wars characters and use unique abilities based on them; Red Bird portrays Luke Skywalker and uses a lightsaber, the yellow bird portrays Han Solo and uses a blaster, and the black bird portrays Obi-Wan Kenobi and uses the Force. (Note: Attributed to multiple sources:) Their abilities can interact with level elements; lightsabers can deflect lasers, which in turn ricochet off silver blocks, and the Force can penetrate walls. Other characters represented include Chewbacca, Lando Calrissian, Leia Organa, Palpatine, and Yoda. The Millennium Falcon, referred to as the "Mighty Falcon", can be summoned and used by the player to eliminate pigs; using the Mighty Falcon awards the player with a bronze, silver, or gold medal instead of the usual star rating. Enemy pigs are also Star Wars-themed; pigs wearing Stormtrooper helmets fire blasters at birds, TIE fighters orbit planetoids in levels set in outer space, and Darth Vader levitates objects via the Force. Hidden collectible eggs, which can be found in levels, unlock bonus levels in which C-3PO and R2-D2 are playable; the former divides into several small pieces, while the latter emits an electrical shock.

Ports of Angry Birds Star Wars for home and handheld consoles introduce additional features such as exclusive levels, multiplayer modes, high-definition video, and achievements. They are also compatible with Kinect, PlayStation Move, Remote Play, and the Xbox One's timed challenges.

== Development ==
During development of Angry Birds Space, its developers experimented with additional levels based on science fiction franchises including Star Wars. Since franchise owner Rovio Entertainment was able to choose who they partnered with, Andrew Stalbow—who was in charge of Rovio's strategic partnerships—contacted Lucasfilm, the company's first choice. Ville Heijari, vice president for franchise development at Rovio, considered a Star Wars collaboration to be the most sensical for a major partnership. The Rovio staff later believed that a Star Wars collaboration deserved more than a patch update, and expanded it into a full game. Angry Birds creator Jaakko Iisalo was against the idea, wanting to work on new projects and believing that he and his team "had already delivered the best possible Angry Birds game", but was later convinced to develop one last Angry Birds title.

During development, the game was codenamed Black and considered top secret. Stalbow stated that the developers aimed to make Angry Birds Star Wars "feel like one of the biggest, if not the biggest, entertainment launches of the year". Blending the two series together was considered a difficult task, with Rovio and Lucasfilm having a "long conversation regarding how [they] could collaborate together", although the castings of which bird would play which Star Wars character were decided upon immediately when development began. The designs that Rovio had created were positively received by LucasArts, Lucasfilm's video game division. Composer Salla Hakkola was given full creative freedom to work with existing Star Wars music by John Williams. Several pieces of merchandise were produced to promote the game, including plush toys and a Jenga playset of a pig-shaped Death Star.

The mobile version received additional post-launch content via patch updates throughout 2013. On June 13, levels set in Cloud City featuring Lando Calrissian as a playable character were added. Another update on December 17 added levels set in the second Death Star and a final boss against Darth Vader and Palpatine.

== Release ==
Angry Birds Star Wars released for Android, iOS, Kindle Fire, OS X, Windows, and Windows Phone on November 8, 2012. In 2013, Angry Birds Star Wars was reported to have surpassed 100 million downloads.

Activision published the home console ports; it released for Nintendo 3DS, PlayStation 3, PlayStation Vita, Wii, Wii U, and Xbox 360 on October 29, 2013, and was further ported to PlayStation 4 and Xbox One in North America on the same day and worldwide on November 1. The company believed that Angry Birds Star Wars was suitable for PlayStation 4 because of the console's multiple control options, including PlayStation Move and the DualShock 4 controller's touchpad, the latter of which interested them particularly. The console ports were priced at US$30–50, whereas the mobile version was US$2.99, which sparked controversy.

== Reception ==
Reception

Aggregate scores
Aggregator	Score
Metacritic	(iOS) 88/100 (X360) 59/100 (PS3) 49/100
OpenCritic	49%

Review scores
Publication	Score
Game Informer	8.5/10
IGN	8.8/10
Macworld	(iOS) 5/5
Nintendo Life	(Wii U) 6/10
Pocket Gamer	(iOS) 9/10 (Vita) 2/5
Push Square	(PS3/PS4) 4/10
TouchArcade	(iOS) 4/5

Award
Publication	Award
Pocket Gamer	Gold Award

According to the review aggregator Metacritic, Angry Birds Star Wars was received as "generally favourable" based on a weighted average score of 88/100 from 22 reviews. On OpenCritic, the game has an average critical score of 49%. Multiple publications have listed it as one of the best mobile games.

Mark Brown of Pocket Gamer gave the title a Gold Award and a score of 9 out of 10, praising the game for being "faithful to the source material" and "filled with content". Justin Davis of IGN praised the playable characters and level design. Eric Ford from TouchArcade called the game "excellent", considering it his favourite Angry Birds game and a "must-play" for iOS users. Andrew Reiner from Game Informer called its levels "the most creative [in the Angry Birds series] to date". Reviewing the iPhone version for Macworld, Lucy Hattersley praised the combination of the gameplay mechanics from Angry Birds with elements from Star Wars, as well as the game's humour and use of gravity mechanics. She singled out the in-game purchases as a downside, but gave the game a five-star rating regardless.

The console ports were more commonly criticised in comparison to the mobile versions. Martin Watts from Nintendo Life gave the Wii U version a score of 6 out of 10; he praised its faithfulness to the source material but criticised the multiplayer modes, which he called "an underwhelming affair". Push Square gave Angry Birds Star Wars a negative score of 4 out of 10; critic Katy Ellis called the PlayStation 3 version "awkwardly out of place" on the platform and better suited for mobile devices, while fellow critic Simon Fitzgerald called the PlayStation 4 version a "clone" of previous Angry Birds titles and criticised its price. Additionally, he noted its use of the DualShock 4's touchpad, but found it "too sensitive" and recommended the analog stick instead. Peter Willington from Pocket Gamer gave the PlayStation Vita port two out of five stars, claiming that the controls—which he called "sloppy"—diminished its value and made it "an inferior version of a great game".

Awards and nominations
Year	Ceremony	Category	Result	Ref.
2013	2013 Webby Awards	Webby Award	Won	
2013	2013 Webby Awards	People's Voice	Won	
2014	2014 Kids' Choice Awards	Favorite Video Game	Nominated	
2014	British Academy Children's Awards	Kids' Vote	Longlisted	

== Future ==
A follow-up, titled Angry Birds Star Wars II, was released for iOS, Android, and Windows Phone on September 19, 2013. It is based on the Star Wars prequel trilogy and launched alongside Telepods, a range of toys-to-life figures used to "teleport" characters into the game.

Angry Birds Star Wars was removed from app stores in 2019. In a 2021 development update on the remake of Angry Birds (2009), brand director Steve Porter stated that Angry Birds Star Wars was unlikely to be re-released or remastered due to investment issues with third-party licensing.
