= Angry Birds Space =

2012 video game

- App icon
- Developer: Rovio Entertainment
- Publisher: Rovio Entertainment
- Series: Angry Birds
- Engine: Box2D
- Platforms: iOS; Android; Windows; Mac OS X
- Release: March 22, 2012
- Genre: Puzzle
- Mode: Single-player

Angry Birds Space is a 2012 puzzle video game developed and published by Rovio Entertainment. The fifth installment in the Angry Birds video game series, it is the first in the series to take place in outer space, and had multiple partnerships with NASA. Rovio also partnered with Samsung with the Samsung Galaxy Note for the game's release.

The game features variations of the existing bird characters and one new character that each carry their own unique abilities. Gameplay takes place across several episodes which are divided into 30 levels each and feature their own gimmicks. The game was released worldwide across multiple mobile devices on March 22, 2012. The game has received generally favorable reviews from critics and was downloaded over 50 million times in 35 days.

== Gameplay ==
The splash screen used in Angry Birds Space

As with its predecessors, Angry Birds Space is a side-scrolling puzzle game; using touchscreen input, players using a slingshot to launch wingless birds and take out the green pigs inside structures. The birds in this game are transformed versions of themselves. For instance, the yellow bird is now able to fly towards a set target. Space also introduces Ice Bird, a square bird who freezes nearby blocks and pigs upon detonation. Upon beating a level, the player receives one to three stars based on their score; attaining three stars in all of the levels grants access to bonus levels, including mirrored, more difficult versions of the normal levels. Later updates introduced power-ups to enhance scores. One power-up summons clones of a bird, another inflates pigs, and another summons an egg that creates a black hole with the player's input.

Gameplay takes place across several episodes which are divided into 30 levels each and feature their own gimmicks: one episode is food-themed, and another has radioactive rocks that take out nearby pigs. As per the name, the game is set in outer space; objects stay static in zero gravity environments and travel in a straight line when pushed. Most levels feature planets with gravitational fields, which attract nearby objects to the surface. At the end of each episode is a boss battle. As with most other Angry Birds games, episodes were gradually added through updates. Through an in-app purchase, the player can access the Danger Zone, which works as the game's climax. Extra levels can also be accessed by finding hidden collectables that include NASA rovers like Sojourner and Phoenix. Many of these levels are parodies of video games such as Super Mario Bros. and Space Invaders.

== Development and release ==
In February 2012, Rovio announced a new game in the Angry Birds series titled Angry Birds Space. Angry Birds Space launched on March 22, 2012, and features elements from the preceding Angry Birds games as well as new gameplay mechanics. The game initially contained 60 levels with additional levels available as free updates or with in-app purchases. For the launch of the game, Rovio partnered with wireless carrier T-Mobile to erect a 300-foot-tall (91 m) contraption, with a 35-foot-tall (11 m) red bird resting in it at the Seattle Space Needle to make it look like a slingshot.

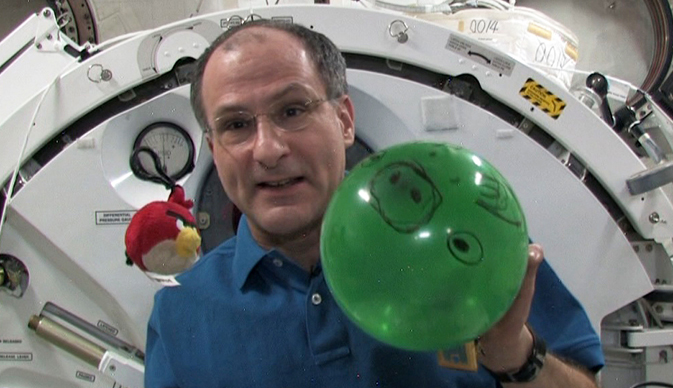
Donald Pettit demonstrates microgravity using characters from Angry Birds.

On March 8, 2012, new footage of Angry Birds Space, presented by NASA astronaut Donald Pettit on board the International Space Station, was released. The video shows that the game's stage is no longer flat, instead comprising several different planetoids, each of which has its own gravitational field that affects the trajectory of the birds after launch. NASA states that such collaboration with Rovio Mobile may share the excitement of space with the Angry Birds community, educate users on NASA's programs, and create interactive educational experiences for the public.

Rovio also partnered with Samsung with the Samsung Galaxy Note for the game's release. The release included free Danger Zone levels and exclusive level for the Galaxy Note until June 21, 2012, for Samsung Galaxy users only when downloaded from the Google Play Store or Samsung Apps (now Samsung Galaxy Store).

The game features variations of the existing bird character and one new character that each carry their own unique abilities. As of June 1, 2012, Angry Birds Space has been downloaded a total of 100 million times since launching on iOS, Android, PC, and Mac. Angry Birds Space was discontinued in early 2019.

== Reception ==
Reception

Aggregate score
Aggregator	Score
Metacritic	iOS: 83/100

Review scores
Publication	Score
TouchArcade	iOS: 5/5
Game Informer	iOS:4+
IGN	iOS:8.5/10
Gamereactor	8.5/10
GameSpot	8/10

The game has received generally favorable reviews with a Metacritic score of 83/100 based on 30 reviews. Justin Davis, writing for IGN, gave the game a score of 8.5/10, calling the pricing and physics disappointing but concluding that "neither issue detracts from the game's overall quality or fun factor."

Harry Slater of Pocket Gamer thought the game was "as much fun as its predecessor" adding that it had "enough new concepts to keep even the hardiest fans entertained". Kyle Hilliard of Game Informer wrote the game is "instantly understandable and easy to play, though lifting your finger sometimes changes the trajectory of your bird at the last second."

Lee West from Gamereactor said it had a clever and entertaining level design, while the sounds were "boring and anonymous", and he also noted that the game was too "heavy on microtransactions." Mark Walton wrote in GameSpot the new birds "are an excellent addition", and that some levels "rely more on luck than skill."

The game was downloaded 50 million times in 35 days. According to Rovio, this made the game the fastest-growing mobile game ever.
