= List of films based on video games =

Many video games have been adapted into films. These include local, national, international, direct-to-video and TV releases, and (in certain cases) online releases. They include their scores on Rotten Tomatoes, the region in which they were released, approximate budget, their approximate box office revenue (for theatrical releases), distributor of the film, and the publisher of the original game at the time the film was made (this means that publishers may change between two adaptations of the same game or game series, such as Mortal Kombat). Also included are short films, cutscene films (made up of cutscenes and cinematics from the actual games), documentaries with video games as their subjects and films in which video games play a large part (such as Tron or WarGames).

== Theatrical releases ==
By original language of the release.

=== English ===
==== Live-action ====
Title	Director	Release date	Budget	Worldwide box office	Rotten Tomatoes	Metacritic	CinemaScore	Distributor	Original game publisher
Super Mario Bros.	Rocky Morton Annabel Jankel	May 28, 1993	$42–48 million	$20,929,518	26% (46 reviews)	35/100	B+	Buena Vista Pictures Distribution	Nintendo
Double Dragon	James Yukich	November 4, 1994	$7.8 million	$2,341,309	12% (17 reviews)	40/100	N/A	Gramercy Pictures	Technōs Japan
Street Fighter	Steven E. de Souza	December 23, 1994	$35 million	$99,433,436	17% (63 reviews)	34/100	B-	Universal Pictures Columbia TriStar Film Distributors International	Capcom
Mortal Kombat	Paul W. S. Anderson	August 18, 1995	$20 million	$122,195,920	44% (78 reviews)	60/100	A-	New Line Cinema	Midway Games
Mortal Kombat Annihilation	John R. Leonetti	November 21, 1997	$30 million	$51,376,861	4% (53 reviews)	11/100	C+	New Line Cinema	Midway Games
Wing Commander	Chris Roberts	March 12, 1999	$25–27 million	$11,578,059	10% (51 reviews)	21/100	D	20th Century Fox	Origin Systems
Lara Croft: Tomb Raider	Simon West	June 15, 2001	$115 million	$274,703,340	21% (163 reviews)	33/100	B	Paramount Pictures	Eidos
Resident Evil	Paul W. S. Anderson	March 15, 2002	$33 million	$102,984,862	36% (162 reviews)	33/100	B	Sony Pictures Releasing	Capcom
Lara Croft: Tomb Raider – The Cradle of Life	Jan de Bont	July 25, 2003	$95 million	$160,099,222	24% (172 reviews)	43/100	B-	Paramount Pictures	Eidos
House of the Dead	Uwe Boll	October 10, 2003	$12 million	$13,818,181	3% (59 reviews)	15/100	N/A	Artisan Entertainment	Sega
Resident Evil: Apocalypse	Alexander Witt	September 10, 2004	$45 million	$129,342,769	18% (130 reviews)	35/100	B	Sony Pictures Releasing	Capcom
Alone in the Dark	Uwe Boll	January 28, 2005	$20 million	$12,693,645	1% (120 reviews)	9/100	F	Lionsgate	Infogrames
Doom	Andrzej Bartkowiak	October 21, 2005	$60–70 million	$58,072,119	18% (133 reviews)	34/100	B-	Universal Pictures	id Software
BloodRayne	Uwe Boll	January 6, 2006	$25 million	$3,650,275	4% (51 reviews)	18/100	N/A	Boll KG Productions	Majesco
Silent Hill	Christophe Gans	April 21, 2006	$50 million	$100,605,135	34% (112 reviews)	31/100	C	Sony Pictures Releasing	Konami
DOA: Dead or Alive	Corey Yuen	September 7, 2006	$30 million	$7,563,325	32% (44 reviews)	38/100	N/A	Dimension Films Summit Entertainment	Tecmo
Resident Evil: Extinction	Russell Mulcahy	September 21, 2007	$45 million	$147,717,833	24% (101 reviews)	41/100	B-	Sony Pictures Releasing	Capcom
Postal	Uwe Boll	October 18, 2007	$15 million	$146,741	9% (45 reviews)	22/100	N/A	Vivendi Entertainment	Ripcord Games
Hitman	Xavier Gens	November 21, 2007	$24 million	$101,276,318	16% (104 reviews)	35/100	B	20th Century Fox	Eidos
In the Name of the King: A Dungeon Siege Tale	Uwe Boll	January 11, 2008	$60 million	$13,097,915	4% (51 reviews)	15/100	N/A	20th Century Fox	Microsoft Studios
Far Cry	Uwe Boll	October 2, 2008	$30 million	$783,501	N/A (2 reviews)	N/A	N/A	20th Century Fox	Ubisoft
Max Payne	John Moore	October 17, 2008	$35 million	$87,066,930	16% (135 reviews)	31/100	C	20th Century Fox	Rockstar Games
Street Fighter: The Legend of Chun-Li	Andrzej Bartkowiak	February 27, 2009	$50 million	$12,764,201	3% (59 reviews)	17/100	N/A	20th Century Fox	Capcom
Tekken	Dwight Little	November 5, 2009	$30 million	$1,697,207	0% (6 reviews)	N/A	N/A	Anchor Bay Entertainment	Bandai Namco Games
Prince of Persia: The Sands of Time	Mike Newell	May 28, 2010	$150–200 million	$336,365,676	37% (227 reviews)	50/100	B	Walt Disney Studios Motion Pictures	Ubisoft
Resident Evil: Afterlife	Paul W. S. Anderson	September 10, 2010	$60 million	$300,228,084	21% (107 reviews)	37/100	B-	Sony Pictures Releasing	Capcom
Resident Evil: Retribution	Paul W. S. Anderson	September 14, 2012	$65 million	$240,159,255	28% (74 reviews)	39/100	C+	Sony Pictures Releasing	Capcom
Silent Hill: Revelation	M. J. Bassett	October 26, 2012	$20 million	$55,362,705	8% (62 reviews)	16/100	C	Open Road Films	Konami
Need for Speed	Scott Waugh	March 14, 2014	$66 million	$203,277,636	23% (182 reviews)	39/100	B+	Walt Disney Studios Motion Pictures	Electronic Arts
Hitman: Agent 47	Aleksander Bach	August 21, 2015	$35 million	$82,347,656	8% (131 reviews)	28/100	B	20th Century Fox	Square Enix
Warcraft	Duncan Jones	June 10, 2016	$160 million	$439,048,914	29% (231 reviews)	32/100	B+	Universal Pictures	Blizzard Entertainment
Assassin's Creed	Justin Kurzel	December 21, 2016	$125 million	$240,697,856	18% (224 reviews)	36/100	B+	20th Century Fox	Ubisoft
Resident Evil: The Final Chapter	Paul W. S. Anderson	January 27, 2017	$40 million	$312,242,626	39% (101 reviews)	49/100	B	Sony Pictures Releasing	Capcom
Tomb Raider	Roar Uthaug	March 16, 2018	$90–106 million	$274,950,803	52% (327 reviews)	48/100	B	Warner Bros. Pictures	Square Enix
Rampage	Brad Peyton	April 13, 2018	$120–140 million	$428,128,399	51% (282 reviews)	45/100	A-	Warner Bros. Pictures	Warner Bros. Games
Dead Trigger	Mike Cuff and Scott Windhauser	May 3, 2019	N/A	$151,493	N/A (1 review)	N/A	N/A	Saban Films	Madfinger Games
Pokémon Detective Pikachu	Rob Letterman	May 10, 2019	$150 million	$451,453,444	68% (317 reviews)	53/100	A-	Warner Bros. Pictures	Nintendo The Pokémon Company
Sonic the Hedgehog	Jeff Fowler	February 14, 2020	$85–90 million	$319,715,683	64% (255 reviews)	47/100	A	Paramount Pictures	Sega
Monster Hunter	Paul W. S. Anderson	December 18, 2020	$60 million	$42,145,959	44% (98 reviews)	47/100	N/A	Sony Pictures Releasing	Capcom
Mortal Kombat	Simon McQuoid	April 23, 2021	$55 million	$84,426,031	55% (299 reviews)	44/100	B+	Warner Bros. Pictures	Warner Bros. Games
Werewolves Within	Josh Ruben	June 25, 2021	$6.5 million	$991,898	86% (148 reviews)	66/100	N/A	IFC Films	Ubisoft
Resident Evil: Welcome to Raccoon City	Johannes Roberts	November 24, 2021	$25 million	$41,914,915	30% (92 reviews)	44/100	C+	Sony Pictures Releasing	Capcom
Uncharted	Ruben Fleischer	February 18, 2022	$120 million	$407,141,258	41% (265 reviews)	45/100	B+	Sony Pictures Releasing	Sony Interactive Entertainment
Sonic the Hedgehog 2	Jeff Fowler	April 8, 2022	$90–110 million	$405,421,518	69% (181 reviews)	47/100	A	Paramount Pictures	Sega
Five Nights at Freddy's	Emma Tammi	October 27, 2023	$20 million	$291,589,416	33% (215 reviews)	33/100	A-	Universal Pictures	ScottGames
Borderlands	Eli Roth	August 9, 2024	$110–120 million	$33,017,367	10% (167 reviews)	26/100	D+	Lionsgate	2K Games
Sonic the Hedgehog 3	Jeff Fowler	December 20, 2024	$122 million	$492,162,604	86% (152 reviews)	56/100	A	Paramount Pictures	Sega
A Minecraft Movie	Jared Hess	April 4, 2025	$150 million	$960,387,780	47% (195 reviews)	45/100	B+	Warner Bros. Pictures	Mojang Studios
Until Dawn	David F. Sandberg	April 25, 2025	$15 million	$54,105,064	52% (120 reviews)	49/100	C+	Sony Pictures Releasing	Sony Interactive Entertainment
Five Nights at Freddy's 2	Emma Tammi	December 5, 2025	$36 million	$238,569,800	17% (132 reviews)	26/100	B	Universal Pictures	ScottGames
Return to Silent Hill	Christophe Gans	January 23, 2026	$23 million	$47,976,996	18% (66 reviews)	33/100	N/A	Cineverse	Konami
Iron Lung	Markiplier	January 30, 2026	$3 million	$50,036,487	59% (49 reviews)	53/100	N/A	Markiplier Studios	David Szymanski
Mortal Kombat II	Simon McQuoid	May 8, 2026	$80 million	$129,470,110	64% (203 reviews)	47/100	B	Warner Bros. Pictures	Warner Bros. Games
Resident Evil	Zach Cregger	September 18, 2026	$75–80 million	$384,195,017	96% (294 reviews)	79/100	B+	Sony Pictures Releasing	Capcom
Street Fighter	Kitao Sakurai	October 16, 2026	$82 million	$60,783,634	41% (128 reviews)	44/100	B-	Paramount Pictures	Capcom

==== Upcoming ====
Title	Director	Release date	Distributor	Original game publisher
Sonic the Hedgehog 4	Jeff Fowler	March 19, 2027	Paramount Pictures	Sega
The Legend of Zelda	Wes Ball	April 30, 2027	Sony Pictures Releasing	Nintendo
A Minecraft Movie Squared	Jared Hess	July 23, 2027	Warner Bros. Pictures	Mojang Studios
Elden Ring	Alex Garland	March 3, 2028	A24	Bandai Namco Entertainment
Helldivers	Justin Lin	June 9, 2028	Sony Pictures Releasing	Sony Interactive Entertainment
Call of Duty	Peter Berg	June 30, 2028	Paramount Pictures	Activision
Untitled Sonic film	TBA	December 22, 2028	Paramount Pictures	Sega
Undated
Watch Dogs	Mathieu Turi	TBA	TBA	Ubisoft
In development
99 Nights in the Forest	TBA	TBA	20th Century Studios	Roblox
Amanda the Adventurer	TBA	TBA	Blumhouse Productions	DreadXP
Battlefield	Christopher McQuarrie	TBA	Sony Pictures Releasing	Electronic Arts
Bendy and the Ink Machine	André Øvredal	TBA	Radar Pictures	Joey Drew Studios
Broken Sword	TBA	TBA	Story Kitchen	Revolution Software
Chained Together	TBA	TBA	TBA	Anegar Games
Clair Obscur: Expedition 33	TBA	TBA	Story Kitchen	Kepler Interactive
Comix Zone	TBA	TBA	Picturestart	Sega
Crossfire	TBA	TBA	Sony Pictures Releasing	Smilegate
Cyberpunk 2077	TBA	TBA	Paramount Pictures	CD Projekt Red
Dark Deception	TBA	TBA	So It Goes Entertainment	Glowstick Entertainment
Days Gone	TBA	TBA	Sony Pictures Releasing	Sony Interactive Entertainment
Death Stranding	Michael Sarnoski	TBA	A24	Sony Interactive Entertainment
Dead by Daylight	Thordur Palsson	TBA	TBA	Behavior Interactive
Untitled Detective Pikachu sequel	Jordan Vogt-Roberts	TBA	TBA	Nintendo The Pokémon Company
Dredge	TBA	TBA	Story Kitchen	Team 17
The Drifter	TBA	TBA	Sony Pictures Releasing	Powerhoof
Duke Nukem	TBA	TBA	Legendary Pictures	Apogee Software/3D Realms
El Paso, Elsewhere	TBA	TBA	TBA	Strange Scaffold
Eternal Champions	TBA	TBA	Skydance Media	Sega
F.E.A.R.	TBA	TBA	TBA	Vivendi Universal Games
Finding Frankie	Steven C. Miller	TBA	TBA	Perp Games
Firewatch	TBA	TBA	TBA	Panic Inc.
Five Nights at Freddy's 3	Emma Tammi	TBA	Universal Pictures	ScottGames
Ghost of Tsushima	Chad Stahelski	TBA	Sony Pictures Releasing	Sony Interactive Entertainment
Gravity Rush	Anna Mastro	TBA	Sony Pictures Releasing	Sony Interactive Entertainment
Hello Neighbor: The Movie	TBA	TBA	BoulderLight Pictures	tinyBuild
Home Safety Hotline	Michael Matthews	TBA	Longevity Pictures	Night Signal Entertainment
Horizon Zero Dawn	TBA	2027	Sony Pictures Releasing	Sony Interactive Entertainment
The House of the Dead	Paul W. S. Anderson	TBA	Story Kitchen	Sega
Jak and Daxter	Ruben Fleischer	TBA	Sony Pictures Releasing	Sony Interactive Entertainment
Just Cause	Ángel Manuel Soto	TBA	Universal Pictures	Square Enix
Untitled Just Dance film	TBA	TBA	Sony Pictures Releasing	Ubisoft
Untitled Lollipop Chainsaw film	TBA	TBA	Nada Holdings	Dragami Games
The Medium	TBA	TBA	TBA	Bloober Team
Untitled Metal Gear film	Zach Lipovsky Adam Stein	TBA	Sony Pictures Releasing	Konami
Mouthwashing	Karyn Kusama	TBA	Sony Pictures Releasing	Critical Reflex
Outlast	TBA	TBA	Lionsgate	Red Barrels
Out Run	Michael Bay	TBA	Universal Pictures	Sega
Untitled Pac-Man film	TBA	TBA	Wayfarer Studios	Bandai Namco Entertainment
Poppy Playtime	TBA	TBA	Legendary Entertainment Angry Films	Mob Entertainment
Untitled Portal film	TBA	TBA	Warner Bros. Pictures	Valve Corporation
Untitled Rabbids film	Todd Strauss-Schulson	TBA	Lionsgate	Ubisoft
Riders Republic	Adil El Arbi Bilall Fallah	TBA	Gaumont	Ubisoft
Ruiner	Wes Ball	TBA	Universal Pictures	Reikon Games
Untitled Saints Row film	F. Gary Gray	TBA	TBA	Deep Silver
Untitled Sea of Thieves film	TBA	TBA	Hisako	Rare
Shinobi	Sam Hargrave	TBA	Universal Pictures	Sega
Untitled Silent Hill film	TBA	TBA	TBA	Konami
Sleeping Dogs	Timo Tjahjanto	TBA	Story Kitchen	Square Enix
Slime Rancher	TBA	TBA	Story Kitchen	Monomi Park
Space Channel 5	TBA	TBA	Picturestart	Sega
Untitled Space Invaders film	TBA	TBA	Warner Bros. Pictures	Taito
Untitled Streets of Rage film	Jeymes Samuel	TBA	Lionsgate	Sega
Untitled Talking Tom film	TBA	TBA	TBA	Outfit7
Untitled Tom Clancy's Ghost Recon film	Michael Bay	TBA	Warner Bros. Pictures	Ubisoft
Untitled Tom Clancy's Splinter Cell film	TBA	TBA	Paramount Pictures Warner Bros. Pictures	Ubisoft
Untitled Uncharted sequel	TBA	TBA	Columbia Pictures	Sony Interactive Entertainment
Vampire Survivors	TBA	TBA	Story Kitchen	Poncle

==== Animated ====
Title	Director	Release date	Budget	Worldwide box office	Rotten Tomatoes	Metacritic	CinemaScore	Distributor	Original game publisher
Final Fantasy: The Spirits Within	Hironobu Sakaguchi	July 11, 2001	$137 million	$85,131,830	44% (144 reviews)	49/100	C+	Columbia Pictures	Square
Resident Evil: Degeneration	Makoto Kamiya	October 17, 2008	N/A	$403,117	67% (6 reviews)	N/A	N/A	Sony Pictures Entertainment Japan	Capcom
Resident Evil: Damnation	Makoto Kamiya	October 27, 2012	N/A	$2,325,035	100% (5 reviews)	N/A	N/A	Sony Pictures Entertainment Japan	Capcom
Moshi Monsters: The Movie	Wip Vernooij	December 20, 2013	£2.3 million	$2,883,694	60% (10 reviews)	N/A	N/A	Universal Pictures	Mind Candy
Heavenly Sword	Gun Ho Jung	September 2, 2014	$1.8 million	N/A	N/A (1 review)	N/A	N/A	Sony Pictures Entertainment	Sony Computer Entertainment
Ratchet & Clank	Kevin Munroe	April 29, 2016	$20 million	$13,385,737	22% (82 reviews)	29/100	B	Gramercy Pictures Focus Features Universal Pictures	Sony Interactive Entertainment
The Angry Birds Movie	Clay Kaytis Fergal Reilly	May 20, 2016	$73 million	$352,333,929	44% (153 reviews)	43/100	B+	Sony Pictures Releasing	Rovio Entertainment
Resident Evil: Vendetta	Takanori Tsujimoto	May 27, 2017	N/A	$256,320	43% (7 reviews)	N/A	N/A	Kadokawa Daiei Studio	Capcom
The Angry Birds Movie 2	Thurop Van Orman	August 14, 2019	$65 million	$147,792,047	72% (108 reviews)	60/100	B+	Sony Pictures Releasing	Rovio Entertainment
The Super Mario Bros. Movie	Aaron Horvath Michael Jelenic	April 5, 2023	$100 million	$1,360,783,214	59% (292 reviews)	46/100	A	Universal Pictures	Nintendo
Scarygirl	Ricard Cussó	June 17, 2023	N/A	$1,194,805	N/A (8 reviews)	N/A	N/A	Madman Entertainment	Square Enix
Resident Evil: Death Island	Eiichirō Hasumi	July 7, 2023	N/A	$43,161	71% (7 reviews)	N/A	N/A	Sony Pictures Releasing	Capcom
The Super Mario Galaxy Movie	Aaron Horvath Michael Jelenic	April 1, 2026	$110 million	$1,012,370,119	42% (225 reviews)	37/100	A-	Universal Pictures	Nintendo

==== Upcoming ====
Title	Director	Release date	Distributor	Original game publisher
The Angry Birds Movie 3	John Rice	December 23, 2026	Paramount Pictures	Rovio Entertainment Sega
Undated
Cookie Run: The Movie	TBA	2029	Big Shot Pictures	Devsisters
Bloodborne	TBA	TBA	Sony Pictures Releasing	Sony Interactive Entertainment
Death Stranding: Mosquito (working title)	Hiroshi Miyamoto	TBA	TBA	Sony Interactive Entertainment
Grow a Garden	TBA	TBA	Story Kitchen	Roblox
Steal a Brainrot	TBA	TBA	Story Kitchen	Roblox
Stray	TBA	TBA	Annapurna Pictures	Annapurna Interactive
To the Moon	TBA	TBA	TBA	Freebird Games

=== Japanese ===
==== Live-action ====
Title	Direction	Release date	Domestic box office	Rotten Tomatoes	Original game publisher
Mirai Ninja	Keita Amemiya	December 2, 1988	N/A	N/A	Namco
Tokimeki Memorial	Hiroshi Sugawara	August 9, 1997	N/A	N/A	Konami
Forbidden Siren	Yukihiko Tsutsumi	February 11, 2006	¥790,000,000	N/A	Sony Computer Entertainment
Like a Dragon	Takashi Miike	March 3, 2007	¥32,846,976	N/A	Sega
OneChanbara	Yōhei Fukuda	April 26, 2008	N/A	N/A	D3 Publisher
Higurashi no Naku Koro ni	Ataru Oikawa	May 10, 2008	¥200,000,000	N/A	07th Expansion
Higurashi no Naku Koro ni Chikai	Ataru Oikawa	April 18, 2009	N/A	N/A	07th Expansion
Ace Attorney	Takashi Miike	February 11, 2012	¥540,000,000	N/A	Capcom
Ao Oni	Daisuke Nibayashi	July 5, 2014	¥200,000,000	N/A	noprops
Gekijōban Zero (Fatal Frame/Project Zero)	Mari Asato	September 26, 2014	¥120,000,000	N/A	Koei Tecmo
Ao Oni ver2.0	Hideaki Maekawa	July 4, 2015	N/A	N/A	noprops
Corpse Party	Yamada Masafumi	August 1, 2015	N/A	N/A	Kenix Soft
Corpse Party Book of Shadows	Yamada Masafumi	July 30, 2016	N/A	N/A	Kenix Soft
House of Neko Atsume	Masatoshi Kurakata	April 8, 2017	N/A	N/A	Hit-Point Co.
Exit 8	Genki Kawamura	August 29, 2025	¥5,100,000,000	91%	Kotake Create

==== Anime ====
International releases
Title	Direction	Release date	Budget	Worldwide box office	Rotten Tomatoes	Metacritic	CinemaScore	Distributor	Original game publisher
Street Fighter II: The Animated Movie	Gisaburō Sugii	August 6, 1994	$6 million	$16,000,000	80%	N/A	N/A	Toei Company 20th Century Fox	Capcom
Pokémon: The First Movie	Kunihiko Yuyama	July 18, 1998 (JP) November 12, 1999 (NA)	$5 million	$172,744,662	17%	35/100	A-	Toho Warner Bros. Pictures	Nintendo The Pokémon Company
Pokémon: The Movie 2000	Kunihiko Yuyama	July 17, 1999 (JP) July 21, 2000 (NA)	$30 million	$133,949,270	19%	28/100	A-	Toho Warner Bros. Pictures	Nintendo The Pokémon Company
Pokémon 3: The Movie	Kunihiko Yuyama	July 8, 2000 (JP) April 6, 2001 (NA)	US$3–16 million	$68,411,275	21%	22/100	A-	Toho Warner Bros. Pictures	Nintendo The Pokémon Company
Pokémon 4Ever	Kunihiko Yuyama	July 7, 2001 (JP) October 11, 2002 (NA)	N/A	$28,023,563	16%	25/100	N/A	Toho Miramax Films	Nintendo The Pokémon Company
Pokémon Heroes	Kunihiko Yuyama	July 13, 2002 (JP) May 16, 2003 (NA)	N/A	$20,867,919	17%	27/100	N/A	Toho Miramax Films	Nintendo The Pokémon Company
Pokémon: Jirachi Wish Maker	Kunihiko Yuyama	July 19, 2003	N/A	¥4,500,000,000	N/A	N/A	N/A	Toho Miramax Films	Nintendo The Pokémon Company
Pokémon: Destiny Deoxys	Kunihiko Yuyama	July 17, 2004	N/A	¥4,380,000,000	N/A	N/A	N/A	Toho Miramax Films	Nintendo The Pokémon Company
Pokémon: Lucario and the Mystery of Mew	Kunihiko Yuyama	July 16, 2005	N/A	¥4,300,000,000	N/A	N/A	N/A	Toho Viz Media	Nintendo The Pokémon Company
Final Fantasy VII: Advent Children	Tetsuya Nomura	September 14, 2005	N/A	N/A	50%	88/100	N/A	Square Enix Columbia Pictures	Square Enix
Pokémon Ranger and the Temple of the Sea	Kunihiko Yuyama	July 15, 2006	N/A	¥3,400,000,000	N/A	N/A	N/A	Toho Viz Media	Nintendo The Pokémon Company
Pokémon: The Rise of Darkrai	Kunihiko Yuyama	July 14, 2007	N/A	¥5,020,000,000	N/A	N/A	N/A	Toho Viz Media	Nintendo The Pokémon Company
Pokémon: Giratina and the Sky Warrior	Kunihiko Yuyama	July 19, 2008	N/A	¥4,800,000,000	N/A	N/A	N/A	Toho Viz Media	Nintendo The Pokémon Company
Pokémon: Arceus and the Jewel of Life	Kunihiko Yuyama	July 18, 2009	N/A	¥4,670,000,000	N/A	N/A	N/A	Toho Viz Media	Nintendo The Pokémon Company
Pokémon: Zoroark: Master of Illusions	Kunihiko Yuyama	July 10, 2010	N/A	$71,143,529	N/A	N/A	N/A	Toho Viz Media	Nintendo The Pokémon Company
Pokémon the Movie: Black—Victini and Reshiram and White—Victini and Zekrom	Kunihiko Yuyama	July 16, 2011	N/A	¥4,330,000,000	N/A	N/A	N/A	Toho Viz Media	Nintendo The Pokémon Company
Pokémon the Movie: Kyurem vs. the Sword of Justice	Kunihiko Yuyama	July 14, 2012	N/A	¥3,610,000,000	N/A	N/A	N/A	Toho Viz Media	Nintendo The Pokémon Company
Pokémon the Movie: Genesect and the Legend Awakened	Kunihiko Yuyama	July 13, 2013	N/A	¥3,170,000,000	N/A	N/A	N/A	Toho Viz Media	Nintendo The Pokémon Company
Pokémon the Movie: Diancie and the Cocoon of Destruction	Kunihiko Yuyama	July 19, 2014	N/A	¥2,910,000,000	N/A	N/A	N/A	Toho Viz Media	Nintendo The Pokémon Company
Yo-kai Watch: The Movie	Shigeharu Takahashi Shinji Ushiro	December 20, 2014	N/A	$80,268,947 (Note: See Yo-kai Watch: The Movie § Box office)	80%	N/A	N/A	Toho	Level-5
Pokémon the Movie: Hoopa and the Clash of Ages	Kunihiko Yuyama	July 18, 2015	N/A	¥2,610,000,000	N/A	N/A	N/A	Toho Viz Media	Nintendo The Pokémon Company
Yo-kai Watch: Enma Daiō to Itsutsu no Monogatari da Nyan!	Shigeharu Takahashi Shinji Ushiro	December 19, 2015	N/A	$58,850,969 (Note: See Yo-kai Watch: Enma Daiō to Itsutsu no Monogatari da Nyan! § Box office)	N/A	N/A	N/A	Toho	Level-5
Kingsglaive: Final Fantasy XV	Takeshi Nozue	July 9, 2016 (JP) August 19, 2016 (NA)	N/A	$6,550,000	13%	35/100	N/A	Aniplex Stage 6 Films	Square Enix
Pokémon the Movie: Volcanion and the Mechanical Marvel	Kunihiko Yuyama	July 16, 2016	N/A	¥2,150,000,000	N/A	N/A	N/A	Toho Viz Media	Nintendo The Pokémon Company
Pokémon the Movie: I Choose You!	Kunihiko Yuyama	July 15, 2017 (JP) November 5, 2017 (NA)	N/A	$37,552,407	33%	N/A	N/A	Toho Viz Media	Nintendo The Pokémon Company
Fate/stay night: Heaven's Feel I. presage flower	Tomonori Sudō	October 14, 2017	N/A	$19,027,568 (Note: See Fate/stay night: Heaven's Feel I. presage flower § Box office)	N/A	N/A	N/A	Aniplex	Type-Moon
Pokémon the Movie: The Power of Us	Tetsuo Yajima	July 13, 2018 (JP) November 24, 2018 (NA)	N/A	$23,740,788	71%	N/A	N/A	Toho Viz Media	Nintendo The Pokémon Company
Fate/stay night: Heaven's Feel II. lost butterfly	Tomonori Sudō	January 12, 2019	N/A	$19,790,000	N/A	N/A	N/A	Aniplex	Type-Moon
Pokémon: Mewtwo Strikes Back Evolution	Kunihiko Yuyama Motonori Sakakibara	July 12, 2019	N/A	¥2,980,000,000	N/A	N/A	N/A	Toho Viz Media	Nintendo The Pokémon Company
NiNoKuni	Yoshiyuki Momose	August 23, 2019	N/A	$2,000,000	N/A	N/A	N/A	OLM, Inc.	Bandai Namco Entertainment
Fate/stay night: Heaven's Feel III. spring song	Tomonori Sudō	March 28, 2020	N/A	$19,252,497	N/A	N/A	N/A	Aniplex	Type-Moon
Pokémon the Movie: Secrets of the Jungle	Tetsuo Yajima	December 25, 2020	N/A	$23,600,000	N/A	N/A	N/A	Toho Viz Media	Nintendo The Pokémon Company
Colorful Stage! The Movie: A Miku Who Can't Sing	Hiroyuki Hata	January 17, 2025 (JP) April 17, 2025 (NA)	N/A	$12,300,000	N/A	N/A	N/A	Shochiku	Sega
Undated
Pokémon: Wild Card	Katsuhiko Kitada	2027	N/A	TBA	N/A	N/A	N/A	Toho Viz Media	Nintendo The Pokémon Company

Japanese releases
Title	Direction	Release date	Domestic box office	Distributor	Original game publisher
Super Mario Bros.: The Great Mission to Rescue Princess Peach!	Masami Hata	July 20, 1986	N/A	Shochiku	Nintendo
Running Boy: Star Soldier no Himitsu	Tameo Kohanawa	July 20, 1986	N/A	Toho	Hudson Soft
Dragon Quest: Dai no Daibōken	Nobutaka Nishizawa	July 20, 1991	N/A	Toei Company TBS	Enix
Dragon Quest: Dai no Daibōken Tachiagare!! Aban no Shito	Hiroki Shibata	March 7, 1992	N/A	Toei Company TBS	Enix
Dragon Quest: Dai no Daibōken Buchiya bure!! Shinsei Rokudai Shoguo	Nobutaka Nishizawa	July 11, 1992	N/A	Toei Company TBS	Enix
Fatal Fury: The Motion Picture	Masami Ōbari	July 16, 1994	N/A	Shochiku	SNK
Sakura Wars: The Movie	Mitsuru Hongo	December 22, 2001	¥2,800,000,000	Toei Company	Sega
Air	Osamu Dezaki	February 5, 2005	N/A	Toei Company	Key
Animal Crossing	Jōji Shimura	December 16, 2006	¥1,700,000,000	Toho	Nintendo
Clannad	Osamu Dezaki	September 15, 2007	N/A	Toei Company	Key
Resident Evil: Degeneration	Makoto Kamiya	October 18, 2008	¥43,000,000	Sony Pictures Entertainment Japan	Capcom
Tales of Vesperia: The First Strike	Kanta Kamei	October 3, 2009	¥84,549,987	Kadokawa Daiei Studio	Bandai Namco Games
Professor Layton and the Eternal Diva	Masakazu Hashimoto	December 19, 2009	¥610,000,000	Toho	Level-5
Fate/stay night: Unlimited Blade Works	Yūji Yamaguchi	January 23, 2010	¥280,000,000	The Klockworx Co., Ltd.	Type-Moon
Sengoku Basara: The Last Party	Kazuya Nomura	June 4, 2011	N/A	Production I.G	Capcom
Tekken: Blood Vengeance	Yōichi Mōri	July 26, 2011	N/A	Asmik Ace Namco Pictures	Bandai Namco Games
Dragon Age: Dawn of the Seeker	Fumihiko Sori	February 11, 2012	N/A	T.O Entertainment	Electronic Arts
Bayonetta: Bloody Fate	Fuminori Kizaki	November 23, 2013	N/A	Crunchyroll, LLC	Sega
Persona 3 The Movie: No. 1, Spring of Birth	Noriaki Akitaya Tomohisa Taguchi	November 23, 2013	¥201,886,754	Aniplex	Atlus
The Idolmaster Movie: Beyond the Brilliant Future!	Atsushi Nishigori	January 25, 2014	¥772,973,700	Aniplex	Namco Bandai Games
Pretty Rhythm All-Star Selection: Prism Show☆Best Ten	Masakazu Hishida	March 8, 2014	N/A	Shochiku	Takara Tomy
Persona 3 The Movie: No. 2, Midsummer Knight's Dream	Tomohisa Taguchi	June 7, 2014	¥152,752,386	Aniplex	Atlus
Aikatsu! The Movie	Ryūichi Kimura Yuichiro Yano	December 13, 2014	¥560,000,000	Toei Company	Bandai Namco Games
PriPara the Movie: Everyone, Assemble! Prism ☆ Tours	Masakazu Hishida	March 7, 2015	¥100,000,000	Medialink	Takara Tomy
Persona 3 The Movie: No. 3, Falling Down	Keitaro Motonaga	April 4, 2015	N/A	Aniplex	Atlus
Gekijōban Meiji Tokyo Renka: Yumihari no Serenade	Hiroshi Watanabe	July 18, 2015	N/A	Movic	Broccoli
Aikatsu! Music Award: Minna de Shō o MoraimaSHOW!	Shin'ya Watada	August 22, 2015	¥130,000,000	Toei Company	Bandai Namco Games
Fly Out, PriPara: Aim for it with Everyone! Idol☆Grand Prix	Nobutaka Yoda	October 24, 2015	N/A	Medialink	Takara Tomy
King of Prism by Pretty Rhythm	Masakazu Hishida	January 9, 2016	¥800,000,000	Avex Pictures	Takara Tomy
Persona 3 The Movie: No. 4, Winter of Rebirth	Tomohisa Taguchi	January 23, 2016	¥42,981,563	Aniplex	Atlus
PriPara Minna no Akogare Let's Go PriPari	Makoto Moriwaki Masao Okubo	March 12, 2016	¥45,000,000	Avex Pictures	Takara Tomy
Monster Strike The Movie	Shinpei Ezaki	December 10, 2016	¥740,000,000	Warner Bros. Pictures Japan	Mixi
Yo-kai Watch: Soratobu Kujira to Double no Sekai no Daibōken da Nyan!	Shigeharu Takahashi Shinji Ushiro Takeshi Yokoi	December 17, 2016	¥3,260,000,000	Toho	Level-5
Resident Evil: Vendetta	Takanori Tsujimoto	May 27, 2017	¥150,000,000	Kadokawa Daiei Studio	Capcom
King of Prism: Pride the Hero	Masakazu Hishida	June 10, 2017	¥600,000,000	Avex Pictures	Takara Tomy
Yo-kai Watch Shadowside: Oni-ō no Fukkatsu	Yoichi Kato Akihiro Hino	December 16, 2017	¥2,040,000,000	Toho	Level-5
Monster Strike The Movie: Sora no Kanata	Hiroshi Nishikiori	October 5, 2018	¥364,672,100	Warner Bros. Pictures Japan	Mixi
Yo-kai Watch: Forever Friends	Shigeru Takahashi	December 14, 2018	¥1,250,000,000	Toho	Level-5
King of Prism: Shiny Seven Stars I: Prologue × Yukinojo × Taiga	Masakazu Hishida	March 2, 2019	¥320,000,000	Avex Pictures	Takara Tomy
King of Prism: Shiny Seven Stars II: Kakeru × Joji × Minato	Masakazu Hishida	March 23, 2019	¥320,000,000	Avex Pictures	Takara Tomy
King of Prism: Shiny Seven Stars III: Leo × Yu × Alec	Masakazu Hishida	April 13, 2019	¥320,000,000	Avex Pictures	Takara Tomy
King of Prism: Shiny Seven Stars IV: Louis × Shin × Unknown	Masakazu Hishida	May 4, 2019	¥320,000,000	Avex Pictures	Takara Tomy
Dragon Quest: Your Story	Takashi Yamazaki Ryuichi Yagi Makoto Hanafusa	August 2, 2019	¥1,420,000,000	Toho	Square Enix
Deemo: Memorial Keys	Junichi Fujisaku Shūhei Matsushita	February 25, 2022	¥33,000,000	Pony Canyon	Rayark

=== Mandarin/Cantonese ===
==== Live-action ====
Title	Direction	Release date	Budget	Domestic box office	Original game publisher
Legend of the Ancient Sword	Renny Harlin	October 1, 2018	HK$300 million	¥14,119,000 (US$2,134,000)	Gamebar
Detention	John Hsu	September 20, 2019	NT$95 million	NT$260 million (US$8,415,000)	Red Candle Games
Dynasty Warriors: Destiny of an Emperor	Roy Chow	April 29, 2021	HK$300 million	HK$6,440,000 (US$830,000)	Koei Tecmo Games

==== Animated ====
Title	Direction	Release date	Domestic box office	Original game publisher
Seer	Liu Hong	June 28, 2011	¥44,078,000 ($6,822,000)	Shanghai Taomee Network
Roco Kingdom: The Dragon Knight	Sheng-jun Yu	September 29, 2011	¥27,292,900 ($4,224,000)	Tencent
Seer 2	Wang Zhangjun	June 28, 2012	¥31,219,000 ($4,946,000)	Shanghai Taomee Network
Roco Kingdom: The Desire of Dragon	Sheng-jun Yu	January 31, 2013	¥69,536,800 ($11,223,000)	Tencent
Seer 3: Heroes Alliance	Wang Zhangjun Yin Yuqi	July 12, 2013	¥76,502,000 ($12,347,000)	Shanghai Taomee Network
Roco Kingdom 3	Gong Bingsi	July 10, 2014	¥47,883,000 ($7,794,000)	Tencent
Seer 4	Wang Zhangjun Yin Yuqi	July 10, 2014	¥62,331,000 ($10,146,000)	Shanghai Taomee Network
Dragon Nest: Warriors' Dawn	Song Yuefeng	July 31, 2014	¥57,409,000 ($9,345,000)	Nexon
Seer 5: Rise of Thunder	Wang Zhangjun	July 23, 2015	¥56,623,000 ($9,092,000)	Shanghai Taomee Network
Roco Kingdom 4	Hugues Martel Dongbiao Cao	August 13, 2015	¥76,985,000 ($12,362,000)	Tencent
Dragon Nest 2: Throne of Elves	Song Yuefeng	August 19, 2016	¥25,113,000 ($3,780,000)	Nexon
Seer 6: Invincible Puni	Wang Zhangjun	August 18, 2017	¥109,000,000 ($16,127,000)	Shanghai Taomee Network
Seer 7: Crazy Intelligence	Wang Zhangjun	August 2, 2019	¥31,508,600 ($4,561,000)	Shanghai Taomee Network
Undated
Untitled Nikki Nuannuan film	Dean Wellins	TBA	TBA	PaperGames

== Television films ==
=== Released ===
Title	Direction	Release date	Original game publisher
Fatal Fury: Legend of the Hungry Wolf	Hiroshi Fukutomi	December 23, 1992	SNK
Fatal Fury 2: The New Battle	Kazuhiro Furuhashi	July 31, 1993	SNK
Art of Fighting	Hiroshi Fukutomi	December 23, 1993	SNK
Samurai Shodown: The Motion Picture	Hiroshi Ishiodori	September 8, 1994	SNK
Pokémon: Mewtwo Returns	Kunihiko Yuyama Masamitsu Hidaka	December 30, 2000 (Japan) December 4, 2001 (North America)	Nintendo The Pokémon Company
Pokémon: The Legend of Thunder	Norihiro Matsubara Yūko Inoue	December 30, 2001 (Japan) June 3/10, 2006 (North America)	Nintendo The Pokémon Company
House of the Dead 2 (live-action)	Michael Hurst	February 11, 2006	Sega
Pokémon: The Mastermind of Mirage Pokémon	Kunihiko Yuyama Masamitsu Hidaka	April 29, 2006 (North America) October 13, 2006 (Japan)	Nintendo The Pokémon Company
Red Faction: Origins (live-action)	Michael Nankin	June 2011	THQ
Higurashi no Naku Koro ni Kaku: Outbreak	Toshifumi Kawase	August 15, 2013	07th Expansion
Rabbids Invasion: Mission to Mars	Franz Kirchner	September 29, 2021 (France) February 18, 2022 (Netflix)	Ubisoft
The Mortuary Assistant	Jeremiah Kipp	February 13, 2026	DreadXP

=== Upcoming ===
Title	Direction	Release date	Original game publisher
Undated
Untitled Beyond Good & Evil film	Rob Letterman	TBA	Ubisoft
BioShock	Francis Lawrence	TBA	2K Games
Gears of War	David Leitch	TBA	Xbox Game Studios
Untitled Carmen Sandiego film	TBA	TBA	Brøderbund
Untitled Dragon's Lair film	James Bobin	TBA	Cinematronics
Untitled It Takes Two film	TBA	TBA	Electronic Arts
Kingmakers	TBA	TBA	tinyBuild
Mega Man	Henry Joost And Ariel Schulman	TBA	Capcom
Sifu	TBA	TBA	Slocap
The Sims	Kate Herron	TBA	Electronic Arts
Split Fiction	Jon M. Chu	TBA	Electronic Arts
ToeJam & Earl	TBA	TBA	Sega
Untitled Tom Clancy's The Division film	Rawson Marshall Thurber	TBA	Ubisoft
Untitled Crazy Taxi film	TBA	TBA	Sega
Untitled Stranger Than Heaven film	TBA	TBA	Sega
Untitled Tomb Raider film	TBA	TBA	Crystal Dynamics
Untitled Warhammer 40,000 film	TBA	TBA	Games Workshop

== Direct-to-video ==
=== Live-action ===
Title	Direction	Release date	Original game publisher
Mirai Ninja	Keita Amemiya	1988	Namco
Tokimeki Memorial	Hiroshi Sugawara	August 9, 1997	Konami
Like a Dragon: Prologue	Takeshi Miyasaka	March 24, 2006	Sega
BloodRayne 2: Deliverance	Uwe Boll	September 18, 2007	Majesco
Alone in the Dark II	Peter Scheerer Michael Roesch	September 25, 2008	Infogrames
OneChanbara: The Movie – Vortex	Tsuyoshi Shôji	November 2, 2009	D3 Publisher
The King of Fighters	Gordon Chan	November 4, 2009	SNK Playmore
BloodRayne: The Third Reich	Uwe Boll	May 2, 2011	Majesco
In the Name of the King 2: Two Worlds	Uwe Boll	December 27, 2011	Microsoft Studios
Halo 4: Forward Unto Dawn	Stewart Hendler	November 6, 2012	Microsoft Studios
Company of Heroes	Don Michael Paul	February 26, 2013	THQ
Zombie Massacre	Luca Boni Marco Ristori	July 1, 2013	1988 Games
In the Name of the King 3: The Last Mission	Uwe Boll	March 11, 2014	Microsoft Studios
Street Fighter: Assassin's Fist	Joey Ansah	May 23, 2014	Capcom
Tekken 2: Kazuya's Revenge	Wych Kaos	August 6, 2014	Bandai Namco Games
Halo: Nightfall	Sergio Mimica-Gezzan	March 17, 2015	Microsoft Studios
Dead Rising: Watchtower	Zach Lipovsky	March 27, 2015	Capcom
Dead Rising: Endgame	Pat Williams	June 20, 2016	Capcom
It Came from the Desert	Marko Mäkilaakso	May 23, 2018	Cinemaware
Doom: Annihilation	Tony Giglio	October 1, 2019	id Software

=== Animation ===
Title	Direction	Release date	Original game publisher
Tengai Makyō Jiraia Oboro Hen	Ouji Hiroi Yoshio Takeuchi	August 21, 1990	Hudson Soft/Red Entertainment
Ninja Gaiden	Mamoru Kanbe	November 22, 1991	Tecmo
Mortal Kombat: The Journey Begins	Joseph Francis	April 11, 1995	Midway Games
Battle Arena Toshinden	Masami Ōbari	June 21, 1996	Sony
Sonic the Hedgehog	Kazutaka Ikegami	May 31, 1996	Sega
Voltage Fighters: Gowcaizer the Movie	Masami Ōbari	1997	SNK
Tekken: The Motion Picture	Kunihisa Sugishima	January 21, 1998	Namco
Samurai Spirits 2: Asura Zanmaden	Kazuhiro Sasaki	December 22, 1999	SNK
Street Fighter Alpha: The Animation	Shigeyasu Yamauchi	April 26, 2000	Capcom
Sin: The Movie	Yasunori Urata	October 24, 2000	Ritual Entertainment
Zone of the Enders: 2167 Idolo	Tetsuya Watanabe	March 1, 2001	Konami
Nakoruru ~Ano hito kara no okurimono~	Katsuma Kanazawa	May 25, 2002	SNK
Welcome to Pia Carrot – Sayaka's Love Story	Yuuji Mutou	October 19, 2002	Cocktail Soft
Galerians: Rion	Masahiko Maesawa	April 24, 2004	ASCII
Last Order: Final Fantasy VII	Morio Asaka	September 14, 2005	Square Enix
Street Fighter Alpha: Generations	Ikuo Kuwana	October 25, 2005	Capcom
Elf Bowling the Movie	Dave Kim Rex Piano	October 2, 2007	NStorm
Dead Space: Downfall	Chuck Patton	October 17, 2008	Electronic Arts
Street Fighter IV: The Ties That Bind	Jirô Kanai Kôji Morimoto	July 12, 2009	Capcom
Dante's Inferno: An Animated Epic	Mike Disa Shukō Murase Yasuomi Umetsu Victor Cook Jong-Sik Nam Kim Sang-jin Lee Seung-Gyu	February 9, 2010	Electronic Arts
Halo Legends	Frank O'Connor Joseph Chou	February 16, 2010	Microsoft Game Studios
Dead Space: Aftermath	Mike Disa	January 25, 2011	Electronic Arts
Mass Effect: Paragon Lost	Atsushi Takeuchi	December 14, 2012	Electronic Arts
Batman: Assault on Arkham	Ethan Spaulding Jay Oliva	July 29, 2014	Warner Bros. Games
Heavenly Sword	Gun Ho Jung	September 2, 2014	Sony Computer Entertainment America
Brotherhood: Final Fantasy XV	Soichi Masui	March 30, 2016 – September 17, 2016	Square Enix
Final Fantasy XV: Episode Ardyn – Prologue	Shinichi Kurita	February 16, 2019	Square Enix
Mortal Kombat Legends: Scorpion's Revenge	Ethan Spaulding	April 14, 2020	Warner Bros. Games
Mortal Kombat Legends: Battle of the Realms	Ethan Spaulding	August 31, 2021	Warner Bros. Games
Injustice	Matt Peters	October 19, 2021	Warner Bros. Games
Mortal Kombat Legends: Snow Blind	Rick Morales	October 11, 2022	Warner Bros. Games
Mortal Kombat Legends: Cage Match	Ethan Spaulding	October 17, 2023	Warner Bros. Games

== Short films ==
Listed below are original short films produced, commissioned or licensed from a game publisher.

Title	Direction	Release date	Original game publisher
Dragon Ball Z Side Story: Plan to Eradicate the Saiyans	Shigeyasu Yamauchi	August 6, 1993	Bandai
Front Mission	Yoshihiko Dai	December 20, 1994	Squaresoft
Front Mission Series: Gun Hazard	Yoshihiko Dai	October 21, 1995	Squaresoft
Abe's Exoddus: The Movie	Lorne Lanning	November 27, 1998	Oddworld Inhabitants
Grand Theft Auto 2: The Movie	Alex De Rakoff Jamie King	September 30, 1999	Rockstar Games
Run the Gauntlet (Driv3r)	Sean Mullens	2004	Atari
Grand Theft Auto: San Andreas – The Introduction	Unknown	2004	Rockstar Games
Crash Bandicoot: No Use Crying (Crash of the Titans)	Jamie Dixon	2007	Vivendi Games
Crash Bandicoot Monster Truck (Crash of the Titans)	Jamie Dixon	2007	Vivendi Games
Crash Bandicoot – Titan Idol (Crash of the Titans)	Jamie Dixon	2007	Vivendi Games
Crash Bandicoot – Have Another (Crash of the Titans)	Jamie Dixon	2007	Vivendi Games
Deep Dive (Kingdom Hearts)	Tetsuya Nomura	March 2007	Square Enix
Halo: Landfall	Neill Blomkamp	October 30, 2007	Microsoft Game Studios
Heavenly Sword	Ben Hibon	November 29, 2007	Sony Computer Entertainment America
Sonic: Night of the Werehog	Takashi Nakashima	November 21, 2008	Sega
Kijujud ayo (Resident Evil 5)	Unknown	2009	Capcom
Assassin's Creed: Lineage	Yves Simoneau	October 26, 2009	Ubisoft
Bright Falls	Phillip Van	April 26, 2010 – May 13, 2010	Microsoft Game Studios
Street Fighter: Legacy	Joey Ansah	May 6, 2010	Capcom
Red Dead Redemption: The Man from Black Water	John Hillcoat	May 29, 2010	Rockstar Games
Mortal Kombat: Rebirth	Kevin Tancharoen	June 8, 2010	Warner Bros. Interactive Entertainment
Zombrex Dead Rising Sun (Dead Rising 2)	Keiji Inafune	August 4, 2010 – August 25, 2010	Capcom
Dragon Ball: Plan to Eradicate the Super Saiyans	Yoshihiro Ueda	November 11, 2010	Bandai Namco Entertainment
Find Makarov: Operation Kingfish (Call of Duty)	Jeff Chan	September 2, 2011	Activision
Assassin's Creed: Embers	Laurent Bernier Ghislain Ouellet	November 15, 2011	Ubisoft
Dragon Age: Redemption	Felicia Day	October 11, 2011	BioWare
Ghost Recon: Alpha	François Alaux Herve de Crecy	2012	Ubisoft
Diablo III – Wrath	Peter Chug	May 8, 2012	Blizzard Entertainment
Tekken Tag Tournament 2	Vincent Gatinaud	October 19, 2012	Bandai Namco Games
Modern Warfare: Sunrise (Call of Duty)	Guillermo de Oliveira Javier Esteban Loring	October 27, 2013	Activision
Expiration Date (Team Fortress 2)	John Cook Robin Walker	June 17, 2014	Valve
Shadow of Mordor	Sam Gorski Niko Pueringer	September 15, 2014	Monolith Productions
Payday 2: Hoxton Breakout (Payday 2)	Unknown	October 18, 2014	Overkill Software
The Night Juicer (Pikmin)	Matsaru Matsuse	November 5, 2014	Nintendo
Treasure in a Bottle (Pikmin)	Matsaru Matsuse	November 5, 2014	Nintendo
Occupational Hazards (Pikmin)	Matsaru Matsuse	November 5, 2014	Nintendo
Star Fox Zero: The Battle Begins	Kyoji Asano	April 20, 2016	Nintendo
Tom Clancy's Ghost Recon Wildlands: War Within the Cartel	Avi Youabian	February 16, 2017	Ubisoft
The Light Candle	Unknown	December 7, 2017	Blizzard Entertainment
Papers, Please – The Short Film	Nikita Ordynskiy	January 27, 2018	Lucas Pope
The Far Cry Experience	Antoine Blossier	November 1, 2012	Ubisoft
Far Cry 5: Inside Eden's Gate (Far Cry 5)	Barry Battles	March 5, 2018	Ubisoft
Carmen Sandiego: To Steal or Not to Steal	Jos Humphrey	March 10, 2018	Broderbund
Conviction (Anthem)	Neill Blom kampSam McGlynn	February 14, 2019	BioWare
PUBG – The Worst Player in the World (PlayerUnknown's Battlegrounds)	Ricky Mabe	July 24, 2019	Bluehole
The Division 2 – Warlords of New York	Olivier Lescot Boddicker	February 25, 2020	Ubisoft

== Documentaries on video games ==
=== Theatrical releases ===
Title	Direction	Release date	Subject
8BIT	Marcin Ramocki Justin Strawhand	2006	The intersections of video games, art, and music
Chasing Ghosts: Beyond the Arcade	Lincoln Ruchti	2007	The golden age of video arcade games
The King of Kong: A Fistful of Quarters	Seth Gordon	August 17, 2007	The rivalry between Billy Mitchell and Steve Wiebe over the Donkey Kong record high score
Frag	Mike Pasley	2008	Professional video gaming
Second Skin	Juan Carlos Pineiro Escoriaza	March 7, 2008	Follows seven people through the world of MMORPGs
Ecstasy of Order: The Tetris Masters	Adam Cornelius	2011	A documentary following world-record holding Tetris players as they prepare for the 2010 Championships
Indie Game: The Movie	James Swirsky Lisanne Pajot	2012	Documentary about the struggles of independent game developers Edmund McMillen and Tommy Refenes during the development of Super Meat Boy, Phil Fish during the development of Fez, and also Jonathan Blow, who reflects on the success of Braid.
Thank You for Playing	David Osit Malika Zouhali-Worrall	2015	Follows the creation of the arthouse video game That Dragon, Cancer
The Lost Arcade	Kurt Vincent	2015	About the influence of the Chinatown Fair arcade on the fighting game community and New York City as a whole.
Moleman 4 – Longplay	Szilárd Matusik	2017	A documentary which recounts the so far little-known story of the beginnings of video game development behind the Iron Curtain. Outfoxed Nintendo, surprised Commodore engineers, The Last Ninja story, a games software outfit that dodged the limelight and led the world.
Polybius: The Video Game That Doesn't Exist	Stuart Brown	2017	About the urban legend of Polybius.
League of Legends Origins	Leslie Iwerks	2019	Fans, experts and creators of the League of Legends detail the game's rise from free demo to global esports titan.
Uncle Art	Lucy Lowe	2019	The story of the man behind some of the most memorable gaming music of the '80s and '90s – Starglider, Carrier Command, Beneath a Steel Sky, After Burner and more: Dave Lowe.
Cannon Arm and the Arcade Quest	Mads Hedegaard	2022	Following the attempts of Kim "Cannon Arm" Kobke to break the world record of arcade game Gyruss.

=== Television ===
Title	Direction	Original air date(s)	Network	Subject
Thumb Candy	James Bobin	2000	Channel 4	History of video games
Games Odyssey	Carsten Walter	2002	3sat	German four-part documentary about the history of video games, simulations, digital adventures and video games as an art form
Game Makers	Various directors	2002–2005	G4	Series on video game industry figures
Tetris: From Russia With Love	Magnus Temple	2004	BBC Four	History of the 1980s Tetris game phenomenon
The Video Game Revolution	Greg Palmer	2004	PBS	
History of Video Games	Unknown	No before than February 2005	Discovery Asia	
Game On!: The Unauthorized History of Videogames	Bob Waldman	2006	CNBC	The story of the video games industry at the Wii and PlayStation 3 console launches
Rise of the Video Game	David Kempner	2007	Discovery	
Charlie Brooker's Gameswipe	Al Campbell	2009	BBC Four	
Cyberdreams/Cyberdrømme	Unknown	2011	DK4 Denmark	Danish documentary about the national eSports team competing in World Cyber Games
How Videogames Changed the World	Graham Proud Marcus Daborn	2013	Channel 4	Charlie Brooker explores the history of interactive entertainment and how it is changing how we work, communicate and play
The Gamechangers	Owen Harris	2015	BBC Two	The story of the controversy caused by Grand Theft Auto, a video game series by Rockstar Games, as various attempts were made to halt the production of the games.

=== Other releases ===
Title	Direction	Release date	Subject
Game Over: Gender, Race & Violence in Video Games	Nina Huntemann	2000	An educational documentary that explores the messages video games send about sex, race, gender, and violence.
Once Upon Atari	Howard Scott Warshaw	2003	Documentary about the rise and fall of Atari, with behind the scenes input from video game designers and programmers who worked there.
Video Game Invasion: The History of a Global Obsession	David Carr David Comtois	2004	Documentary about the history of video games.
It's in the Game	Unknown	2007	The game industry, technology, and the future of gaming.
Beyond the Game	Jos de Putter	2008	About the world of professional video gaming.
Playing Columbine	Danny Ledonne	2008	Following the video game Super Columbine Massacre RPG! in which players experience the Columbine High School massacre through the eyes of the murderers, Eric Harris and Dylan Klebold.
Moral Kombat	Spencer Halpin	2009	A study of video game violence.
Get Lamp	Jason Scott	2010	Documentary by historian Jason Scott about interactive fiction (text adventures) and Infocom.
King of Chinatown	Jordan Levinson Calvin Theobald	2010	Following professional esports player Justin Wong as he and his manager TriForce, attempt to make a career in the competitive Street Fighter IV scene.
Level Up - A story about gamers and the games they play	Justin Switzer	2011	Exploration of video gaming culture.
100 Yen: The Japanese Arcade Experience	Brad Crawford	2012	Historical documentary about the evolution of Japanese arcades and the culture surrounding it.
Minecraft: The Story of Mojang	Paul Owens	2012	Documentary about the history of the company Mojang and its creation, Minecraft.
The Smash Brothers	Travis Beauchamp	2013	A documentary series that covers the early years of the Super Smash Bros. Melee competitive scene, focusing on the lives and subsequent story-lines of seven of the game's most dominant players at the time.
The Art of the Game	Matthew Davis Walker	2014	Documentary that focuses on Academy of Art University students as they compete for a position in the game industry.
Atari: Game Over	Zak Penn	2014	Documentary on the Atari video game burial excavation.
Free to Play	Valve	2014	Documentary by video game developer Valve about the lives of three players competing in a gaming tournament for Dota 2.
From Bedrooms to Billions	Anthony Caulfield Nicola Caulfield	2014	Documentary telling the story of the British video games industry from 1979 to the present day.
Good Game	Mary Ratliff	2014	Nine men pursue careers in competitive video games as members of the Evil Geniuses' StarCraft II division.
Gaming in Color	Philip Jones	2014	Documentary on the LGBTQ community in video games.
The King of Arcades	Sean Tiedeman	2014	Following classic arcade collector Richie Knucklez as he opens an arcade business in Flemington, New Jersey.
Video Games: The Movie	Jeremy Snead	2014	Documentary about the history of video games.
GameLoading – Rise of the Indies	Anna Brady Lester Francois	2015	Follows several independent game developers, including Davey Wreden (The Stanley Parable), Rami Ismail (Luftrausers) and Zoë Quinn (Depression Quest).
GTFO	Shannon Sun-Higginson	2015	Documentary about sexism and women in the world of video games.
Man vs Snake: The Long and Twisted Tale of Nibbler	Andrew Seklir Tim Kinzy	2015	Following players as they try to accumulate a billion points on the 1982 arcade game Nibbler.
Nintendo Quest	Rob McCallum	2015	Documentary road film about Jay Bartlett and his quest to acquire all 678 licensed Nintendo Entertainment System games within the span of 30 days, without purchasing any games online.
Beep: A Documentary History of Game Sound	Karen Collins	2016	Examining the history of game sound design from penny arcades, pinball and video games up to 2015.
FGC: Rise of the Fighting Game Community	Esteban Martinez	2016	Documentary about the fighting game community.
From Bedrooms to Billions: The Amiga Years!	Anthony Caulfield Nicola Caulfield	2016	Documentary on the Amiga and how it influenced a generation of game developers.
Console Wars	Jonah Tulis Blake J. Harris	2020	Documentary about the 1990s console wars between Nintendo and Sega in the 16-bit era and the rise and fall of Sega in the home console market.
From Bedrooms to Billions: The PlayStation Revolution	Anthony Caulfield Nicola Caulfield	2020	Documentary on the creation of the Sony PlayStation and its successor consoles.
Insert Coin	Joshua Y. Tsui	2020	Documentary on the history of Midway Games.
Metagame	Travis Beauchamp	2020	A follow-up to 2013's The Smash Brothers, this documentary series focuses on the events that led up to the rise of the Five Gods of Melee, and their subsequent downfall and defeat at the hands of William "Leffen" Hjelte.
Rarity: Retro Video Game Collecting in the Modern Era	Edward Payson	2021	Documentary on video game collecting.
Power On: The Story of Xbox	Andrew Stephan	2021	Documentary of the story of the creation, evolution, challenges and legacy of Microsoft Xbox consoles after 20 years of its original launch, divided on 6 chapters.
Stamps Back	Szilárd Matusik	2022	The story of how teenagers in Hungary ignited a computing revolution in the 1980s with illegally copied video games from the West, and began the Hungarian demoscene.
We Met in Virtual Reality	Joe Hunting	2022	Documentary that takes place entirely within the video game VRChat, exploring the social relations developed by users and how their lives were changed by their time on the platform.
Running With Speed	Patrick Lope Nicholas Mross	2023	Documentary about the speedrunning community narrated by speedrunning historian Summoning Salt.
FPS: First Person Shooter	David L. Craddock Christopher Stratton	2023	Bringing together the largest ensemble of gaming icons ever assembled on screen, FPS: First Person Shooter takes fans on a nostalgic journey through classics from Doom and Duke Nukem 3D to GoldenEye 007, Halo, and beyond.
EarthBound USA	Jazzy Boho	2023	Documentary "about how EarthBound fans have fought to popularize the Mother series in North America since the 1990s".
Grand Theft Hamlet	Sam Crane Pinny Grylls	2024	Documentary about a production of William Shakespeare's Hamlet delivered entirely in Grand Theft Auto Online during the COVID-19 lockdown in England in 2020.
George A. Romero's Resident Evil	Brandon Salisbury	2025	About the unrealized film adaptation of the horror video game series Resident Evil, for which filmmaker George A. Romero was considered as a director.

== Films with plots centered on video games ==
- Tron (1982) – Directed by Steven Lisberger. Kevin Flynn, an arcade game designer, gets digitized into the video game world he created and has to fight his way back to the real world. The movie coincided with the release of the successful Tron video game.
- Nightmares (1983) – Directed by Joseph Sargent. The segment "Bishop of Battle" stars Emilio Estevez as a video game wizard who breaks into the arcade at night to get to the 13th level, in doing so he becomes part of the game.
- WarGames (1983) – Directed by John Badham. Computer hacker breaks into military intelligence computer to play games, which almost starts a thermonuclear war.
- Joysticks (1983) – Directed by Greydon Clark. When a top local businessman and his two bumbling nephews try to shut down the town's only video arcade, arcade employees and patrons fight back.
- Cloak & Dagger (1984) – Directed by Richard Franklin. A young boy has secret plans given to him in the form of a video game cartridge, which he must protect from spies.
- The Last Starfighter (1984) – Directed by Nick Castle. A boy, who is very good at a video game in his trailer park, finds himself recruited to be a pilot for an alien defense force just like the game he plays.
- The Dungeonmaster (1985) – Directed by Charles Band and Ted Nicolaou. A computer whiz is drawn into a series of realistic simulations by a demonic wizard who considers him a worthy adversary. Armed with his wrist-mounted X-CaliBR8 computer, he must solve the puzzles and rescue his girlfriend.
- Hollywood Zap! (1986) – Directed by David Cohen. A bored clerk decides to quit his job and travel to Hollywood, California to fulfill his dreams and to find his missing father. He chooses a hustler as his traveling companion, but both of them experience disillusionment during their quest.
- Kung Fu Master (1988) – Directed by Agnès Varda. A love story between a 40-year-old woman (Jane Birkin) and a 15-year-old boy addicted to the arcade game Kung-Fu Master.
- The Wizard (1989) – Directed by Todd Holland. A boy with mental problems decides to run away to compete in a video game contest and his brother helps him hitchhike to the tournament. Features numerous NES video games, primarily Super Mario Bros. 3 before its American release.
- No Life King (1989) – Directed by Jun Ichikawa. A group of kids become transfixed from a recently released video game Legend Of Life King IV, a parody of Dragon Quest III.
- The Lawnmower Man (1992) – Directed by Brett Leonard. A mentally handicapped man is turned into a genius through the application of computer science and virtual reality.
- Arcade (1993) – Directed by Albert Pyun. A teenager has to battle inside of a deadly virtual reality video game, to save her friends.
- Brainscan (1994) – Directed by John Flynn. A teenager is sent a mysterious computer game that uses hypnosis to make the game the most horrifying experience imaginable. He stops playing, only to find evidence that the murders depicted in the game actually happened.
- Nirvana (1997) – Directed by Gabriele Salvatores. A computer game designer finds that his latest video game has a virus which has given consciousness to the main character of the game, Solo.
- eXistenZ (1999) – Directed by David Cronenberg. A game designer finds herself targeted by assassins while playing a virtual reality game of her own creation.
- How to Make a Monster (2001) – Directed by George Huang. An evil video game comes to life and hunts the group of developers.
- Avalon (2001) – Directed by Mamoru Oshii. Science fiction film centered on a war-themed, virtual reality MMO under the same title.
- Game Over (2003) – Directed by Jason Bourque. Uses footage from five different Digital Pictures games.
- Spy Kids 3-D: Game Over (2003) – Directed by Robert Rodriguez. Carmen Cortez is caught in a virtual reality game designed by their new nemesis, the Toymaker. Juni, her little brother, goes into the game to save her as well as beta players and the world.
- GameBox 1.0 (2004) – Directed by David Hillenbrand and Scott Hillenbrand. A video game tester must fight to escape from a video game that has become all too real.
- Satan's Little Helper (2004) – Directed by Jeff Lieberman. A nine-year old gamer mistakes a costumed killer for a video game version of the Devil.
- Devour (2005) – Directed by David Winkler. A college student is under the demonic influence of an online game.
- Hellraiser: Hellworld (2005) – Directed by Rick Bota. Features a MMORPG based on the Hellraiser mythology.
- Grandma's Boy (2006) – Directed by Nicholaus Goossen. A 35-year-old game tester develops a game in secret only to have someone at work try to steal it.
- Stay Alive (2006) – Directed by William Brent Bell. Friends start dying just like they did in a video game they all played.
- Ben X (2007) – Directed by Nic Balthazar. The main character Ben is an autistic boy obsessed with an MMORPG called ArchLord. He plays the game to escape being bullied and has one online friend named Scarlite. He considers suicide until he meets Scarlite in person.
- Press Start (2007) – Directed by Ed Glaser. Average suburban youth Zack Nimbus is recruited by an ill-tempered ninja and a tough-as-nails space soldier to save the world from a tyrannical, but comically insecure, sorcerer. References to many classic video games.
- WarGames: The Dead Code (2008) – Directed by Stuart Gillard. Is a sequel to WarGames.
- Gamer (2009) – Directed by Mark Neveldine and Brian Taylor. A man has to save humanity from being enslaved by an MMO.
- Assault Girls (2009) – Directed by Mamoru Oshii. Three girls in an MMO team up to win a boss battle.
- Scott Pilgrim vs. the World (2010) – Directed by Edgar Wright. Is an action comedy film rife with video game references and plot conceit similar to fighting games.
- Tron: Legacy (2010) – Directed by Joseph Kosinski. Kevin Flynn's son Sam finds his missing father in a new version of the virtual game world and has a similar journey as his father did fighting to get back to reality.
- Black Heaven (2010) – Directed by Gilles Marchand. An innocent young man becomes enamored with a mysterious girl. He is lured into "Black Hole" – a dark, obscure video game world of avatars with deadly serious intentions in the real world.
- RPG Metanoia (2010) – Directed by Luis C. Suárez. Is a Philippine animated adventure film in which a MMORPG called Metanoia gets infected by a virus which affects the online world, and a young player goes on a journey to save the online world and prevent it from taking over the offline world.
- Best Player (2011) – Directed by Richard Amberg. Is a comedy film about two gamers.
- Ra.One (2011) – Directed by Anubhav Amant. Is an Indian Bollywood superhero film, where a video game developer creates an unstoppable villain for his son which becomes all too real.
- .hack//The Movie (2012) – Directed by Hiroshi Matsuyama. Is a Japanese anime film based on .hack, a franchise of anime, video games, novels and manga that debuted in 2002, about a virtual reality MMORPG.
- Wreck-It Ralph (2012) – Directed by Rich Moore. An arcade game villain who dreams of being a hero decides to leave his game to become one. Features cameos by multiple licensed video game characters like Sonic the Hedgehog, Pac-Man, Ryu, Bowser, and many more.
- Noobz (2012) – Directed by Blake Freeman. A motley crew of gamers participate in a video game competition.
- Angry Video Game Nerd: The Movie (2014) – Directed by James Rolfe and Kevin Finn. This film is based on the web series of the same name, it tells us about the Nerd's long journey to discover the secrets of the cartridges of E.T. the Extra-Terrestrial video game for the Atari 2600, considered the worst videogame of all time, buried in the desert of New Mexico.
- Pixels (2015) – Directed by Chris Columbus. When aliens misinterpret video-feeds of Arcade video games and console games as a declaration of war, they attack the Earth, using the games as models for their various assaults to fight aliens such as Donkey Kong, Space Invaders and Pac-Man.
- The Gamechangers (2015) – Directed by Owen Harris. A British docudrama based on Sam Houser's life during the development of the video game Grand Theft Auto: San Andreas and the multiple controversies that surrounded Rockstar Games due to the violence of their video games, the Hot Coffee mod controversy and his clashes with lawyer Jack Thompson.
- Beta Test (2016) – Directed by Nicholas Gyeney. A gamer discovers that events in a new video game are being mirrored in the real world, and joins forces with the game's protagonist to unravel the conspiracy.
- The Warriors Gate (2016) – Directed by Matthias Hoene. An avid game is transported to a parallel dimension.
- Sword Art Online the Movie: Ordinal Scale (2017) – Directed by Tomohiko Itō. Is a Japanese anime film based on Sword Art Online, a novel, manga and anime franchise that debuted in 2002, about a virtual reality MMO, with Ordinal Scale being about an augmented reality MMO.
- Jumanji: Welcome to the Jungle (2017) – Directed by Jake Kasdan. Teenagers find a vintage video game version of Jumanji and get sucked into its jungle setting.
- eHero (2018) – Directed by Joseph Procopio. An up-and-coming video gamer and his team must overcome a fiery gaming superstar, as well as their own battling egos, to win the ultimate video game championship.
- Good Game: The Beginning (2018) – Directed by Umut Aral. An underdog Esports team that competes in a League of Legends tournament
- Ready Player One (2018) – Directed by Steven Spielberg. Based on the 2011 novel of the same name, it is set in a dystopian future and is about the search for an easter egg in a virtual reality game called Oasis.
- Ralph Breaks the Internet (2018) – Directed by Rich Moore and Phil Johnston. Sequel to Wreck-It Ralph, and part of the Wreck-It Ralph franchise.
- Serenity (2019) – Directed by Steven Knight. Midway through the film, it is revealed that the story is occurring inside a virtual world.
- The King's Avatar: For the Glory (2019) – Directed by Zhiwei Deng and Juansheng Shi. Animated film based on the Chinese web novel of the same name.
- Jumanji: The Next Level (2019) – Directed by Jake Kasdan. Sequel to Jumanji: Welcome to the Jungle.
- Fearless (2020) – Directed by Cory Edwards. Two high school seniors try to return three babies to the video game they came from after they mysteriously arrive on Earth.
- Boss Level (2021) – Directed by Joe Carnahan. A retired soldier is trapped in a never-ending time loop that repeatedly results in his death. It adapts video game tropes in film format.
- Free Guy (2021) – Directed by Shawn Levy. Guy, a non-player character, becomes aware of his world being a video game called Free City.
- 8-Bit Christmas (2021) – Directed by Michael Dowse. A father recounts his quest to get a Nintendo Entertainment System in the 1980s.
- Choose or Die (2022) – Directed by Toby Meakins. As people play the text-based video game CURS>R, the game begins to interact with the real world.
- 1Up (2022) – Directed by Kyle Newman. An all-girl team competes in a gaming competition.
- Fantasy Football (2022) – Directed by Anton Cropper. A girl plays Madden NFL 23 to control her Dad in actual NFL playoffs.
- Tetris (2023) – Directed by Jon S. Baird. Biopic movie about the battle led by Henk Rogers and Nintendo for the Tetris rights for its version of Famicom / NES and the upcoming Game Boy during the tensions of the Cold War between the United States and the Soviet Union in the late 1980s.
- Gran Turismo (2023) – Directed by Neill Blomkamp. Biopic movie about a Gran Turismo player whose gaming skills won a series of Nissan-sponsored video game competitions to become an actual professional race car driver.
- Tron: Ares (2025) – Directed by Joachim Rønning. Standalone sequel to Tron: Legacy.

== See also ==
- Film and television adaptations of video games
- List of television series based on video games
- List of animated series based on video games
- List of anime based on video games
- List of highest-grossing films based on video games
- List of video games based on films
- List of video games based on comics
- Machinima
