= List of highest-grossing films based on video games =

This is a list of the highest-grossing films based on video games, including both live-action and animated video game films.

== Criteria ==
Any type of video game, including RPGs, visual novels, digital pets and pocket gadgets, is included on the list. Exceptionally, films such as Tron, Wreck-It Ralph, Pixels, and Ready Player One are inspired by video games (and, in many cases, include actual video game characters making appearances), but are not adapted from any actual video game; as such, they are not included.

== Highest-grossing video game films ==
The following is a list of grossing films based on video games, all films have had a theatrical run (including re-releases) since 1993, films that have not played during this period do not appear on the chart because of ticket-price inflation, population size and ticket purchasing trends not being considered.

Resident Evil is the most frequent franchise, with seven of its films on the list, while its respective publisher Capcom is the most frequent publisher, with nine films on the list. The Super Mario Bros. Movie is the highest grossing video game film and ranks among the 50 highest-grossing films of all time. Iron Lung is the only indie film on the list; it ranks among the 50 highest-grossing independent films of all time. 2026 is the most prominent year on this list, with five entries in total.

† indicates films playing in theaters around the world in the week commencing 13 November 2026.

Rank		Title	Year	Gross	Original source		Ref	Format
No.	Peak	Title	Year	Gross	Series / Game	Publisher	Ref	Format
1	1	The Super Mario Bros. Movie	2023	$1,360,783,214	Super Mario	Nintendo		Animated
2	2	The Super Mario Galaxy Movie	2026	$1,013,175,531	Super Mario & Galaxy	Nintendo		Animated
3	2	A Minecraft Movie	2025	$960,387,780	Minecraft	Mojang		Live
4	2	Sonic the Hedgehog 3	2024	$492,162,604	Sonic the Hedgehog & Adventure 2	Sega		Hybrid
5	1	Warcraft	2016	$439,048,914	Warcraft	Blizzard		Live
6	2	Pokémon: Detective Pikachu	2019	$433,305,346	Pokémon & Detective Pikachu	Nintendo		Hybrid
7	2	Rampage	2018	$428,028,233	Rampage	Midway		Live
8	8	Resident Evil †	2026	$409,722,000	Resident Evil	Capcom		Live
9	4	Uncharted	2022	$407,141,258	Uncharted	Sony		Live
10	4	Sonic the Hedgehog 2	2022	$405,421,518	Sonic the Hedgehog	Sega		Hybrid
11	2	The Angry Birds Movie	2016	$352,333,929	Angry Birds	Rovio		Animated
12	1	Prince of Persia: The Sands of Time	2010	$336,365,676	Prince of Persia & Sands of Time	Ubisoft		Live
13	6	Sonic the Hedgehog	2020	$320,954,026	Sonic the Hedgehog	Sega		Hybrid
14	4	Resident Evil: The Final Chapter	2017	$312,257,250	Resident Evil	Capcom		Live
15	2	Resident Evil: Afterlife	2010	$300,228,084	Resident Evil	Capcom		Live
16	12	Five Nights at Freddy's	2023	$297,144,130	Five Nights at Freddy's	ScottGames		Live
17	7	Tomb Raider	2018	$274,950,803	Tomb Raider & TR 2013	Square Enix		Live
18	1	Lara Croft: Tomb Raider	2001	$274,703,340	Tomb Raider	Eidos		Live
19	6	Assassin's Creed	2016	$240,558,621	Assassin's Creed	Ubisoft		Live
20	4	Resident Evil: Retribution	2012	$240,004,424	Resident Evil	Capcom		Live
21	19	Five Nights at Freddy's 2	2025	$238,313,292	Five Nights at Freddy's & FNAF2	ScottGames		Live
22	5	Need for Speed	2014	$203,277,636	Need for Speed	Electronic Arts		Live
23	1	Pokémon: The First Movie^{[§]}	1998	$172,744,662	Pokémon	Nintendo		Animated
24	3	Tomb Raider: The Cradle of Life	2003	$160,099,222	Tomb Raider	Eidos		Live
25	4	Resident Evil: Extinction	2007	$148,412,065	Resident Evil	Capcom		Live
26	16	The Angry Birds Movie 2	2019	$147,792,047	Angry Birds	Rovio		Animated
27	2	Pokémon: The Movie 2000	1999	$133,949,270	Pokémon	Nintendo		Animated
28	27	Mortal Kombat II	2026	$129,570,110	Mortal Kombat	Warner		Live
29	5	Resident Evil: Apocalypse	2004	$129,342,769	Resident Evil	Capcom		Live
30	1	Mortal Kombat	1995	$124,741,822	Mortal Kombat	Midway		Live
31	24	Gran Turismo	2023	$121,966,534	Gran Turismo	Sony		Live
32	4	Resident Evil	2002	$102,984,862	Resident Evil	Capcom		Live
33	9	Hitman	2007	$101,276,318	Hitman	Eidos		Live
34	34	Street Fighter †	2026	$100,753,000	Street Fighter	Capcom		Live
35	9	Silent Hill	2006	$100,605,135	Silent Hill	Konami		Live
36	14	Yo-kai Watch: The Movie	2014	$99,481,307	Yo-kai Watch	Level-5		Animated
37	1	Street Fighter	1994	$99,423,521	Street Fighter II	Capcom		Live
38	11	Max Payne	2008	$87,066,930	Max Payne	Rockstar		Live
39	6	Final Fantasy: The Spirits Within	2001	$85,131,830	Final Fantasy	Squaresoft		Animated
40	28	Mortal Kombat	2021	$84,426,031	Mortal Kombat	Warner		Live
41	18	Hitman: Agent 47	2015	$82,347,656	Hitman	Square Enix		Live
42	15	Pokémon Zoroark: Master of Illusions	2010	$71,143,529	Pokémon	Nintendo		Animated
43	4	Pokémon 3: The Movie	2000	$68,411,275	Pokémon	Nintendo		Animated
44	22	Yo-kai Watch: Enma Daiō to Itsutsu no Monogatari da Nyan!	2015	$59,020,446	Yo-kai Watch	Level-5	(Note: Yo-kai Watch: Enma Daiō to Itsutsu no Monogatari da Nyan!: Japan – ¥5,530,000,000 ($51,000,000); South Korea, France, Spain – $7,967,212; United Arab Emirates – $47,502; Thailand – $5,732)	Animated
45	12	Doom	2005	$58,072,119	Doom & D3	id Software		Live
46	17	Pokémon the Movie: Black / White	2011	$57,082,491	Pokémon	Nintendo		Animated
47	20	Silent Hill: Revelation	2012	$55,362,705	Silent Hill & SH3	Konami		Live
48	44	Until Dawn	2025	$54,105,064	Until Dawn	Sony		Live
49	3	Mortal Kombat Annihilation	1997	$51,376,861	Mortal Kombat	Midway		Live
50	46	Iron Lung	2026	$51,226,173	Iron Lung	Szymanski		Live

== Box office ticket sales ==
The following table lists known estimated box office ticket sales for various high-grossing video games films that have sold more than 10 million tickets worldwide.

Note that some of the data are incomplete due to a lack of available admissions data from a number of countries. Therefore, it is not an exhaustive list of all the highest-grossing video game films by ticket sales, so no rankings are given.

Title	Year	Tickets (est.)	Original source		Ref	Format
Title	Year	Tickets (est.)	Series / Game	Publisher	Ref	Format
The Super Mario Bros. Movie	2023	168,100,000	Super Mario Bros.	Nintendo		Animated
The Super Mario Galaxy Movie	2026	134,900,000	Super Mario & Galaxy	Nintendo	(Note: The Super Mario Galaxy Movie admissions: United States – 37,762,000; Japan – 4,947,393; Brazil, China, France, Germany, Italy, Russia, Spain – 21,564,771; Mexico – 14,810,000; United Kingdom – 4,700,000; South Korea – 1,606,328; Argentina – 1,159,454; United Arab Emirates – 353,188; Czech Republic – 195,858; Greece – 164,368; Hungary – 140,369; Finland – 136,106; Bulgaria – 90,982; Slovakia – 78,585)	Animated
A Minecraft Movie	2025	82,600,000	Minecraft	Mojang		Live
Pokémon: Detective Pikachu	2019	66,600,000	Pokémon & Detective Pikachu	Nintendo	(Note: Detective Pikachu admissions: United States and Canada – 15,993,900; Japan – 2,120,000; China – 18,209,492; Europe – 12,026,023; Mexico – 4,500,000; South Korea – 686,809)	Hybrid
Resident Evil: The Final Chapter	2017	61,100,000	Resident Evil	Capcom		Live
Warcraft	2016	60,597,988	Warcraft	Blizzard	(Note: Warcraft admissions: United States – 5,475,000; China and Bolivia – 39,664,155; Europe – 14,295,559; South Korea – 1,163,274)	Live
Resident Evil †	2026	53,700,000	Resident Evil	Capcom		Live
Rampage	2018	48,553,556	Rampage	Midway		Live
Assassin's Creed	2016	48,300,000	Assassin's Creed	Ubisoft		Live
Sonic the Hedgehog 3	2024	46,600,000	Sonic & Adventure 2	Sega		Hybrid
The Angry Birds Movie	2016	44,869,284	Angry Birds	Rovio		Animated
Sonic the Hedgehog 2	2022	44,800,000	Sonic the Hedgehog	Sega		Hybrid
Uncharted	2022	44,700,000	Uncharted	Sony		Live
Sonic the Hedgehog	2020	41,078,604	Sonic the Hedgehog	Sega	(Note: Sonic the Hedgehog admissions: United States and Canada – 15,876,790; Europe – 12,454,206; Mexico, Peru, Ecuador, Dominican Republic – 8,241,240; Brazil – 3,001,403; China – 698,500; Argentina – 687,740; South Korea – 118,725)	Hybrid
Prince of Persia: The Sands of Time	2010	40,926,883	Prince of Persia & Sands of Time	Ubisoft	(Note: Prince of Persia: The Sands of Time admissions: United States, China, Mexico, Brazil – 22,890,440; Europe – 16,032,910; South Korea – 2,003,533)	Live
Lara Croft: Tomb Raider	2001	40,641,686	Tomb Raider	Eidos		Live
Pokémon: The First Movie	1998	38,666,305	Pokémon	Nintendo	(Note: Pokémon: The First Movie admissions: Japan – 6,650,000; United States and United Kingdom – 21,000,000; Other European countries – 10,365,945; Brazil – 468,000; South Korea (Seoul City) – 182,360)	Animated
Five Nights at Freddy's	2023	30,500,000	Five Nights at Freddy's	ScottGames		Live
Tomb Raider	2018	28,275,185	Tomb Raider & 2013	Square Enix		Live
Resident Evil: Retribution	2012	28,200,000	Resident Evil	Capcom		Live
The Angry Birds Movie 2	2019	22,700,000	Angry Birds	Rovio		Animated
Resident Evil: Afterlife	2010	22,489,698	Resident Evil	Capcom	(Note: Resident Evil: Afterlife admissions: United States – 7,600,000; Japan and China – 6,362,177; Europe – 5,887,085; Brazil – 1,430,898; South Korea – 1,209,538)	Live
Need for Speed	2014	22,100,000	Need for Speed	EA		Live
Five Nights at Freddy's 2	2025	20,600,000	FNAF & FNAF2	ScottGames		Live
Mortal Kombat	1995	20,005,462	Mortal Kombat	Midway	(Note: Mortal Kombat (1995) admissions: United States and Europe (excluding United Kingdom) – 19,019,210; United Kingdom – 938,454; South Korea (Seoul City) – 47,798)	Live
Pokémon: The Movie 2000	1999	19,568,660	Pokémon	Nintendo	(Note: Pokemon: The Movie 2000 admissions: Japan – 5,600,000; United States – 8,184,000; Europe (excluding France) – 5,034,378; France – 730,002; South Korea (Seoul City) – 20,280)	Animated
Tomb Raider: The Cradle of Life	2003	17,973,322	Tomb Raider	Eidos		Live
Resident Evil: Apocalypse	2004	15,900,717	Resident Evil	Capcom	(Note: Resident Evil: Apocalypse admissions: United States – 8,245,000; Japan – 2,200,000; Europe – 3,839,062; Brazil – 1,117,655; South Korea – 499,000)	Live
Resident Evil	2002	15,654,345	Resident Evil	Capcom	(Note: Resident Evil (2002) admissions: United States – 6,905,286; Japan – 2,420,000; Europe – 5,306,422; Brazil – 751,928; South Korea – 270,709)	Live
Resident Evil: Extinction	2007	14,461,130	Resident Evil	Capcom	(Note: Resident Evil: Extinction admissions: United States – 7,459,000; Japan – 1,933,000; Europe – 3,636,124; Brazil – 875,155; South Korea – 557,851)	Live
Street Fighter †	2026	13,300,000	Street Fighter	Capcom		
Final Fantasy: The Spirits Within	2001	12,843,549	Final Fantasy	Squaresoft	(Note: Final Fantasy: The Spirits Within admissions: United States – 5,961,378; Japan – 820,000; France – 1,456,523; Spain – 1,184,156; Other European countries – 3,119,125; Taiwan – 30,000)	Animated
Street Fighter	1994	12,074,749	Street Fighter II	Capcom	(Note: Street Fighter (1994) admissions: United States – 8,232,000; France, Germany, Spain – 2,752,921; United Kingdom – 1,000,000; South Korea – 89,633; Denmark and Finland – 195 (since 1996))	Live
Silent Hill	2006	11,857,278	Silent Hill	Konami	(Note: Silent Hill admissions: United States – 7,318,000; France, United Kigndom, Brazil – 1,762,441; Other European countries – 2,350,432; Japan – 230,000; South Korea – 196,405)	Live
Gran Turismo	2023	11,600,000	Gran Turismo	Sony		Live
Mortal Kombat	2021	11,100,000	Mortal Kombat	Warner		Live
Mortal Kombat II	2026	10,500,000	Mortal Kombat	Warner		Live
Pokémon 3: The Movie	2001	10,114,751	Pokémon	Nintendo	(Note: Pokémon 3 admissions: Japan – 4,500,000; United States – 3,055,000; Europe (excluding France) – 1,861,275; Brazil – 538,075; France – 160,401)	Animated

== Biggest opening weekends ==
The following is a list of video game movies which have opened to more than $10 million.

No.	Film	Year	Opening	Original source		Ref
No.	Film	Year	Opening	Series / Game	Publisher	Ref
1	The Super Mario Bros. Movie	2023	$375,579,730	Super Mario Bros.	Nintendo	
2	The Super Mario Galaxy Movie	2026	$372,640,795	Super Mario Bros. & Galaxy	Nintendo	
3	A Minecraft Movie	2025	$313,453,003	Minecraft	Mojang Studios	
4	Pokémon: Detective Pikachu	2019	$161,000,000	Pokémon & Detective Pikachu	Nintendo	
5	Sonic the Hedgehog 2	2022	$141,000,000	Sonic the Hedgehog	Sega	
6	Resident Evil	2026	$108,300,000	Resident Evil	Capcom	
7	Sonic the Hedgehog	2020	$101,000,000	Sonic the Hedgehog	Sega	
8	Resident Evil: The Final Chapter	2016	$94,335,503^{C}	Resident Evil	Capcom	
9	Warcraft	2016	$65,141,191^{C}	Warcraft	Blizzard	
10	Need for Speed	2014	$63,400,000	Need for Speed	Electronic Arts	
11	Mortal Kombat II	2026	$63,000,000	Mortal Kombat	Warner	
12	Sonic the Hedgehog 3	2024	$60,102,146*	Sonic & Adventure 2	Sega	
13	Rampage	2018	$55,005,673^{C}	Rampage	Midway Games	
14	Lara Croft: Tomb Raider	2001	$47,735,743*	Tomb Raider	Eidos Interactive	
15	Uncharted	2022	$44,010,155*	Uncharted	Sony Interactive	
16	Tomb Raider	2018	$40,839,420^{C}	Tomb Raider & 2013	Square Enix	
17	The Angry Birds Movie	2016	$38,155,177*	Angry Birds	Rovio	
18	Pokémon: The First Movie	1999	$31,036,678*	Pokémon	Nintendo	
19	Prince of Persia: The Sands of Time	2010	$30,095,259*	Prince of Persia & Sands of Time	Ubisoft	
20	Resident Evil: Afterlife	2010	$26,650,264*	Resident Evil	Capcom	
21	Resident Evil: Extinction	2007	$23,678,580*	Resident Evil	Capcom	
22	Mortal Kombat	2021	$23,302,503*	Mortal Kombat	Midway Games	
23	Mortal Kombat	1995	$23,283,887*	Mortal Kombat	Midway Games	
24	Resident Evil: Apocalypse	2004	$23,036,273*	Resident Evil	Capcom	
25	Tomb Raider: The Cradle of Life	2003	$21,783,641*	Tomb Raider	Eidos Interactive	
26	Hitman	2007	$21,094,148*	Hitman	Eidos Interactive	
27	Resident Evil: Retribution	2012	$21,052,227*	Resident Evil	Capcom	
28	Silent Hill	2006	$20,152,598*	Silent Hill	Konami	
29	Pokémon: The Movie 2000	2000	$19,575,608*	Pokémon	Nintendo	
30	Iron Lung	2026	$18,190,786*	Iron Lung	David Szymanski	
31	Resident Evil	2002	$17,707,106*	Resident Evil	Capcom	

- * = North America only
- ^{C} = China only

== Timeline of records ==
=== Highest-grossing films ===
At least eight films have held the record of 'highest-grossing film of all time based on a video game' since the 1993 film Super Mario Bros. assumed the top spot.

- Three of the films, Super Mario Bros., Pokémon: The First Movie and The Super Mario Bros. Movie are based on Nintendo video games.
  - Pokémon: The First Movie was the first animated film to do so.
  - The Super Mario Bros. Movie was the first film to reach the half billion and billion dollar marks at the box-office.
- Each three early films are the first time to do so in three consecutive years (1993-1995) in the mid-1990s.

Year	Title	Record gross	Length	Original source		Ref
Year	Title	Record gross	Length	Game / Series	Publisher	Ref
1993	Super Mario Bros.	$38,912,465	1 year	Super Mario Bros.	Nintendo	
1994	Street Fighter	$99,423,521	1 year	Street Fighter	Capcom	
1995	Mortal Kombat	$124,741,822	3 years	Mortal Kombat	Midway	
1998	Pokémon: The First Movie	$172,744,662	3 years	Pokémon	Nintendo	
2001	Lara Croft: Tomb Raider	$274,703,340	9 years	Tomb Raider	Eidos	
2010	Prince of Persia: The Sands of Time	$336,365,676	6 years	Prince of Persia & The Sands of Time	Ubisoft	
2016	Warcraft	$439,048,914	7 years	Warcraft	Blizzard	
2023	The Super Mario Bros. Movie	$1,360,650,924	Ongoing	Super Mario Bros.	Nintendo	

=== Biggest opening weekends ===
Notes:

- * means domestic opening in North America.
- ^{C} means opening in China.

Established	Title	Record gross	Length	Original source		Ref
Established	Title	Record gross	Length	Game / Series	Publisher	Ref
1993	Super Mario Bros.	$8,532,623*	2 years	Super Mario Bros.	Nintendo	
1995	Mortal Kombat	$23,283,887*	4 years	Mortal Kombat	Midway	
1999	Pokémon: The First Movie	$31,036,678*	2 years	Pokémon	Nintendo	
2001	Lara Croft: Tomb Raider	$47,735,743*	13 years	Tomb Raider	Eidos	
2014	Need for Speed	$63,400,000	2 years	Need for Speed	EA	
June 2016	Warcraft	$65,141,191^{C}	6 months	Warcraft	Blizzard	
Dec 2016	Resident Evil: The Final Chapter	$94,335,503^{C}	3 years	Resident Evil	Capcom	
2019	Pokémon: Detective Pikachu	$161,000,000	4 years	Pokémon & Detective Pikachu	Nintendo	
2023	The Super Mario Bros. Movie	$375,579,730	Ongoing	Super Mario Bros.	Nintendo	

== Highest-grossing films by year ==
Year	Title	Gross	Budget	Original source		Ref
Year	Title	Gross	Budget	Series / Game	Publisher	Ref
1993	Super Mario Bros.	$38,912,465	$48,000,000	Super Mario Bros.	Nintendo	
1994	Street Fighter	$99,423,521	$35,000,000	Street Fighter	Capcom	
1995	Mortal Kombat	$124,741,822	$20,000,000	Mortal Kombat	Midway	
1996	—N/a	—N/a	—N/a	—N/a	—N/a	—N/a
1997	Mortal Kombat Annihilation	$51,376,861	$30,000,000	Mortal Kombat	Midway	
1998	Pokémon: The First Movie	$172,744,662	$5,000,000	Pokémon	Nintendo	
1999	Pokémon: The Movie 2000	$133,949,270	$30,000,000	Pokémon	Nintendo	
2000	Pokémon 3: The Movie	$68,411,275	$16,000,000	Pokémon	Nintendo	
2001	Lara Croft: Tomb Raider	$274,703,340	$115,000,000	Tomb Raider	Eidos	
2002	Resident Evil	$102,984,862	$33,000,000	Resident Evil	Capcom	
2003	Tomb Raider: The Cradle of Life	$160,099,222	$95,000,000	Tomb Raider	Eidos	
2004	Resident Evil: Apocalypse	$129,342,769	$45,000,000	Resident Evil	Capcom	
2005	Doom	$58,072,119	$60,000,000	Doom & D3	id Software	
2006	Silent Hill	$100,605,135	$50,000,000	Silent Hill	Konami	
2007	Resident Evil: Extinction	$148,412,065	$45,000,000	Resident Evil	Capcom	
2008	Max Payne	$87,066,930	$35,000,000	Max Payne	Rockstar	
2009	Pokémon: Arceus and the Jewel of Life	$50,673,078	—N/a	Pokémon	Nintendo	
2010	Prince of Persia: The Sands of Time	$336,365,676	$150,000,000	Prince of Persia & Sands of Time	Ubisoft	
2011	Pokémon the Movie: Black / White	$57,082,491	—N/a	Pokémon	Nintendo	
2012	Resident Evil: Retribution	$240,004,424	$65,000,000	Resident Evil	Capcom	
2013	Pokémon the Movie: Genesect and the Legend Awakened	$32,293,377	—N/a	Pokémon	Nintendo	
2014	Need for Speed	$203,277,636	$66,000,000	Need for Speed	EA	
2015	Hitman: Agent 47	$82,347,656	$35,000,000	Hitman	Square Enix	
2016	Warcraft	$439,048,914	$160,000,000	Warcraft	Blizzard	
2017	Resident Evil: The Final Chapter	$312,257,250	$40,000,000	Resident Evil	Capcom	
2018	Rampage	$428,028,233	$120,000,000	Rampage	Midway	
2019	Pokémon: Detective Pikachu	$433,305,346	$150,000,000	Pokémon & Detective Pikachu	Nintendo	
2020	Sonic the Hedgehog	$320,954,026	$85,000,000	Sonic the Hedgehog	Sega	
2021	Mortal Kombat	$84,426,031	$55,000,000	Mortal Kombat	Warner Bros.	
2022	Sonic the Hedgehog 2	$405,421,518	$110,000,000	Sonic the Hedgehog	Sega	
2023	The Super Mario Bros. Movie	$1,360,783,214	$100,000,000	Super Mario Bros.	Nintendo	
2024	Sonic the Hedgehog 3	$492,162,604	$125,000,000	Sonic the Hedgehog & Adventure 2	Sega	
2025	A Minecraft Movie	$960,387,780	$150,000,000	Minecraft	Mojang	
2026	The Super Mario Galaxy Movie	$1,013,175,531	$110,000,000	Super Mario Bros. & Galaxy	Nintendo	

== Highest-grossing film franchises ==
The following is a list of the highest-grossing film series and film franchises based on video games. Mario sits as the highest-grossing franchise with over $2.4 billion at the box office; it also has the best average with $804 million per film.

A film series needs to surpass $50 million to qualify for the list.

† Background shading indicates that at least one film in the series is playing in the week commencing 13 November 2026 in theaters around the world.

Highest-grossing animated franchises and film series^{[§]}(The films in each franchise can be viewed by selecting "show")

Rank	Series	Total worldwide box office	No. of films	Average of films	Highest-grossing film

1
Super Mario
$2,412,871,210
3
$804,290,403
The Super Mario Bros. Movie ($1,360,783,214)

	Animated series	$2,373,958,745	2	$1,186,979,373	The Super Mario Bros. Movie ($1,360,783,214)
1	The Super Mario Bros. Movie (2023)	$1,360,783,214			
2	The Super Mario Galaxy Movie (2026)	$1,013,175,531			

Super Mario Bros. (1993)	$38,912,465

2	Resident Evil †	$1,679,538,320	11	$152,685,302	Resident Evil (2026) ($400,000,000)
/ Live-action series / $1,233,229,454 / 6 / $205,538,242 / The Final Chapter ($312,257,250); 1 / The Final Chapter (2017) / $312,257,250; 2 / Afterlife (2010) / $300,228,084; 3 / Retribution (2012) / $240,004,424; 4 / Extinction (2007) / $148,412,065; 5 / Apocalypse (2004) / $129,342,769; 6 / Resident Evil (2002) / $102,984,862
/ Animated series / $4,067,739 / 3 / $1,355,913 / Damnation ($2,325,035); 1 / Damnation (2012) / $2,325,035; 2 / Vendetta (2017) / $1,203,792; 3 / Degeneration (2008) / $538,912
Resident Evil (2026) † / $400,000,000
Welcome to Raccoon City (2021) / $41,851,340

3	Pokémon	$1,507,766,458	24	$62,823,602	Detective Pikachu ($433,305,346)
Detective Pikachu (2019) / $433,305,346
/ Original series / $423,996,689 / 5 / $84,799,338 / The First Movie ($172,744,662); 1 / The First Movie (1998) / $172,744,662; 2 / The Movie 2000 (1999) / $133,949,270; 3 / 3: The Movie (2000) / $68,411,275; 4 / 4Ever (2001) / $28,023,563; 5 / Heroes (2002) / $20,867,919
/ Diamond & Pearl / $207,651,955 / 4 / $51,912,989 / Zoroark: Master of Illusions ($71,143,529); 1 / Zoroark Master of Illusions (2010) / $71,143,529; 2 / Arceus and the Jewel of Life (2009) / $50,673,078; 3 / Giratina and the Sky Warrior (2008) / $43,338,599; 4 / The Rise of Darkrai (2007) / $42,496,749
/ Best Wishes! / $135,384,123 / 3 / $45,128,041 / Black—Victini and Reshiram and White—Victini and Zekrom ($57,082,491); 1 / Black—Victini and Reshiram and White—Victini and Zekrom (2011) / $57,082,491; 2 / Kyurem vs. the Sword of Justice (2012) / $46,008,255; 3 / Genesect and the Legend Awakened (2013) / $32,293,377
/ Advanced Generation / $132,598,260 / 4 / $33,149,565 / Lucario and the Mystery of Mew ($37,228,626); 1 / Lucario and the Mystery of Mew (2005) / $37,228,626; 2 / Destiny Deoxys (2004) / $34,337,258; 3 / Jirachi Wish Maker (2003) / $33,393,751; 4 / Ranger and the Temple of the Sea (2006) / $27,638,625
/ Alternate continuity / $104,692,106 / 4 / $26,173,027 / I Choose You! ($37,552,144); 1 / I Choose You! (2017) / $37,552,144; 2 / Mewtwo Strikes Back: Evolution (2019) / $27,347,118; 3 / The Power of Us (2018) / $23,740,788; 4 / Secrets of the Jungle (2020) / $16,052,056
/ XY / $70,137,979 / 3 / $23,379,326 / Diancie and the Cocoon of Destruction ($28,595,105); 1 / Diancie and the Cocoon of Destruction (2014) / $28,595,105; 2 / Hoopa and the Clash of Ages (2015) / $21,815,482; 3 / Volcanion and the Mechanical Marvel (2016) / $19,727,392

4	Sonic the Hedgehog	$1,218,538,148	3	$406,179,383	Sonic the Hedgehog 3 ($492,162,604)
1	Sonic the Hedgehog 3 (2024)	$492,162,604			
2	Sonic the Hedgehog 2 (2022)	$405,421,518			
3	Sonic the Hedgehog (2020)	$320,954,026			

5
Tomb Raider
$706,159,531
3
$235,386,510
Tomb Raider (2018) ($274,950,803)

	Original series	$434,802,562	2	$217,401,281	Lara Croft: Tomb Raider ($274,703,340)
1	Lara Croft: Tomb Raider (2001)	$274,703,340			
2	The Cradle of Life (2003)	$160,099,222			

Tomb Raider (2018)	$274,950,803

6	Five Nights at Freddy's	$531,092,035	2	$265,546,018	Five Nights at Freddy's ($291,589,416)
1	Five Nights at Freddy's (2023)	$291,589,416			
2	Five Nights at Freddy's 2 (2025)	$239,502,619			

7	Angry Birds	$500,125,976	2	$250,062,988	The Angry Birds Movie ($352,333,929)
1	The Angry Birds Movie (2016)	$352,333,929			
2	The Angry Birds Movie 2 (2019)	$147,792,047			

8
Mortal Kombat
$387,568,922
4
$96,892,231
Mortal Kombat II ($129,570,110)

	Reboot series	$213,996,141	2	$106,998,071	Mortal Kombat II ($129,570,110)
1	Mortal Kombat II (2026)	$129,570,110			
2	Mortal Kombat (2021)	$84,426,031			

	Original series	$173,572,781	2	$86,786,391	Mortal Kombat ($122,195,920)
1	Mortal Kombat (1995)	$122,195,920			
2	Annihilation (1997)	$51,376,861			

9	Street Fighter †	$220,099,722	4	$55,024,931	Street Fighter ($99,423,521)
1	Street Fighter (1994)	$99,423,521			
2	Street Fighter (2026) †	$91,912,000			
3	Street Fighter II: The Animated Movie (1994)	$16,000,000			
4	The Legend of Chun-Li (2009)	$12,764,201			

10	Yo-kai Watch	$214,129,135	5	$42,825,827	Yo-kai Watch: The Movie ($99,481,307)
1	Yo-kai Watch: The Movie (2014)	$99,481,307			
2	Enma Daiō to Itsutsu no Monogatari da Nyan! (2015)	$58,850,969			
3	Soratobu Kujira to Double no Sekai no Daibōken da Nyan! (2016)	$29,965,191			
4	Shadowside: Oni-ō no Fukkatsu (2017)	$18,187,307			
5	Forever Friends (2018)	$7,644,361			

11	Digimon	$204,934,969	18	$11,385,276	Revenge of Diaboromon ($37,590,688)
/ Adventure 02 / $56,390,688 / 2 / $28,195,344 / Revenge of Diaboromon ($37,590,688); 1 / Revenge of Diaboromon (2001) / $37,590,688; 2 / Hurricane Touchdown/Transcendent Evolution! The Golden Digimentals (2000) / $18,800,000
/ Adventure / $47,065,295 / 2 / $23,532,648 / Our War Game! ($27,065,295); 1 / Our War Game! (2000) / $27,065,295; 2 / Adventure (1999) / $20,000,000
/ Tamers / $38,430,458 / 2 / $19,215,229 / Battle of Adventurers ($25,060,458); 1 / Runaway Locomon (2002) / $25,060,458; 2 / Battle of Adventurers (2001) / $13,370,000
Adventure: Last Evolution Kizuna (2020) (Note: Digimon Adventure: Last Evolution Kizuna gross revenue: Japan – $2,600,000; China – $19,160,000; Other territories – $1,671,755; Taiwan – $700,000) / $24,141,755
Digimon: The Movie (2000) / $16,643,191
/ Adventure tri. / $8,748,815 / 6 / $1,458,136 / Reunion ($2,300,000); 1 / Reunion (2015) / $2,490,581; 2 / Determination (2016) / $1,600,000; 3 / Loss (2017) / $1,319,114; 4 / Future (2018) / $1,254,324; 5 / Confession (2016) / $1,150,000; 6 / Coexistence (2017) / $934,796
Frontier: Island of Lost Digimon (2002) / $5,900,000
Savers: Ultimate Power! Activate Burst Mode!! (2006) / $5,250,000
Adventure 02: The Beginning (2023) / $1,531,234
Digital Monster X-Evolution (2005) / $850,000

12	Silent Hill	$189,538,953	3	$63,179,651	Silent Hill ($100,605,135)
1	Silent Hill (2006)	$100,605,135			
2	Revelation (2012)	$55,362,705			
3	Return to Silent Hill (2026)	$33,571,113			

13	Hitman	$183,623,974	2	$91,811,987	Hitman (2007) ($101,276,318)
1	Hitman (2007)	$101,276,318			
2	Agent 47 (2015)	$82,347,656			

14	Final Fantasy	$91,611,810	2	$45,805,905	Final Fantasy: The Spirits Within ($85,131,830)
1	The Spirits Within (2001)	$85,131,830			
2	Kingsglaive (2016)	$6,479,980			

15	Fate	$71,442,696	8	$8,930,337	Fate/stay night: Heaven's Feel - III. Spring Song ($20,401,597)
/ Fate/stay night: Heaven's Feel / $58,026,143 / 3 / $19,342,048 / Spring Song ($20,401,597); 1 / Spring Song (2020) (Note: $19 million in Japan. $1,401,597 overseas.) / $20,401,597; 2 / Lost Butterfly (2019) / $20,201,611; 3 / Presage Flower (2017) / $17,422,935
/ Fate/Grand Order / $9,092,314 / 3 / $3,030,771 / Divine Realm of the Round Table: Camelot ($3,669,705); 1 / Divine Realm of the Round Table: Camelot (2020) / $3,669,705; 2 / The Grand Temple of Time (2021) / $3,308,000; 3 / Camelot Paladin; Agateram (2021) / $2,114,609
Fate/stay night: Unlimited Blade Works (2010) / $3,205,829
Fate/Kaleid Liner Prisma Illya: Vow in the Snow (2017) / $1,118,410

16	Seer	$64,041,000	7	$9,148,714	Invincible Puni (2017) ($16,127,000)
1	Seer Movie 6: Invincible Puni (2017)	$16,127,000			
2	Heroes Alliance (2013)	$12,347,000			
3	Seer 4 (2014)	$10,146,000			
4	Rise of Thunder (2015)	$9,092,000			
5	Seer (2011)	$6,822,000			
6	Seer 2 (2012)	$4,946,000			
7	Crazy Intelligence (2019)	$4,561,000			

== See also ==
- List of films based on video games
- Film and television adaptations of video games
- List of best-selling video game franchises
- List of best-selling video games
