= Seer (franchise) =

Chinese video game series and media franchise

- Genre: MMO
- Developers: Shanghai Taomi Network Technology Co., Ltd.
- Publishers: Shanghai Taomi Network Technology Co., Ltd.
- Platforms: Web browser, PC, Android, iOS, IPadOS
- First release: Seer; 2009
- Latest release: Seer: Elf Battle; 2025

Seer (simplified Chinese: 赛尔号; traditional Chinese: 賽爾號; pinyin: sài ěr hào) is a Chinese video game series and media franchise, including a animated series and film series. The franchise is owned by Shanghai Taomee Network in China.

Seer, which is an acronym for Space Energy Robot, involves cartoon monsters (called 精灵) fighting one another, similar to the gameplay of Pokémon.

== Characters ==
The game revolves Space Energy Robots that acquire monsters and go on missions. Most Seers are playable characters in the game. Some monsters include:

- Akexiya (阿克西亚) is an Ice-type elf capable of one-shotting enemies with its ultimate move.
- Moshidilu (魔狮迪露) is a Normal-type elf, first encountered by the player as a boss with a ridiculous amount of health.
- Puni (谱尼) is a Holy-type elf, one of the strongest of the game's early period (before 2012).
- Leiyi (雷伊) is an Electric-type Legendary elf introduced in Seer. As the second patron saint of Panor Galaxy and king of the new generations of electric-type elves, he created the Thunder Guard and leads the God of War alliance to protect the entire Seer System. Because of his fascinating appearance and a variety of powerful skills, he becomes one of the hottest monster in Seer series.
- Gaiya (盖亚) is a Fighting-type Legendary elf, one of the closest friends and comrades of Leiyi.
- Bokeer (波克尔) is a Flying-type elf, depicted as a wild, nimble, and beastly bird. It is capable of 2 very rarely encountered special moves - one that will always leave the enemy with at least 1 health remaining even if otherwise lethal, and 1 that always brings the enemy's health down to Bokeer's current health no matter what the enemy's original health was.
- Pipi (皮皮) is the primitive, unevolved form of Bokeer. It has large ears and has not yet developed wings. The large ears will eventually develop into wings when Pipi evolves. It is widely known as one of the cutest elves in the game.
- Hamoleite (哈莫雷特) is a Dragon-type elf, one of the hardest bosses to fight against in the early days of the game.
- Menghuwang (猛虎王) is a Ground-type elf, depicted as a fearsome, brutal tiger.

== Film series ==
Title	Release date	Chinese box office		
Title	Release date	CN¥	US$	Ref
Seer	June 28, 2011	¥44,078,000	$6,822,000	
Seer 2	June 28, 2012	¥31,219,000	$4,946,000	
Seer 3: Heroes Alliance	July 12, 2013	¥76,502,000	$12,347,000	
Seer 4	July 10, 2014	¥62,331,000	$10,146,000	
Seer 5: Rise of Thunder	July 23, 2015	¥56,623,000	$9,092,000	
Seer 6: Invincible Puni	August 18, 2017	¥109,000,000	$16,127,000	
Seer 7: Crazy Intelligence	August 2, 2019	¥31,508,600	$4,561,000	
Total		¥411,261,600	$64,041,000	
