= Hisako =

- Gender: Female
- Language: Japanese

Other names
- Related names: Hisa; Hisae; Hisaya; Hisayo

Hisako is a Japanese name for females. Although written romanized the same way, the kanji can be different.

Hisako may refer to:

- Hisako Arakaki (高橋 久子; born 1977), J-pop singer
- Hisako Hibi (1907–1991), Japanese-born American Issei painter and printmaker
- Hisako Higuchi (樋口 久子; born 1945), Japanese professional golfer
- Hisako Kanemoto (金元 寿子; born 1987), Japanese voice actress and singer
- Hisako Koyama (小山 ひさ子; 1916–1997), Japanese solar observer
- Hisako Kyōda (京田 尚子; born 1935), Japanese actress and voice actress
- Hisako Manda (萬田 久子; born 1958), Japanese actress
- Hisako Matsubara (松原 久子; born 1935), Japanese novelist
- Hisako Mizui (水井 妃佐子; born 1972), Japanese badminton player
- Hisako Mori (森 久子; born 1964), Japanese badminton player
- Hisako Mukai (向井 久子; born 1978), Japanese female volleyball player
- Hisako Nakamura (中村 久子; 1897–1968), Japanese author, artist, and performer
- Hisako Ōishi (大石 尚子; 1936–2012), Japanese politician
- Hisako Sasaki (佐々木 久子; born 1967), Japanese retired professional wrestler
- Hisako Shirata (白田 久子; born 1982), Japanese actress, fashion model and beauty pageant titleholder
- Hisako Takahashi (高橋 久子; 1927–2013), Japanese judge
- Hisako Terasaki (1928–2024), Japanese-American etcher
- Hisako Tōjō (東城 日沙子; born 1990), Japanese voice actress
- Hisako Tottori, (born 1953), later the Princess Takamado of Japan

== Characters ==
- Hisako, an undead spirit in the video game Killer Instinct
- Hisako Ichiki (Armor), a hero in the X-Men comics
- Hisako Arato, a character from the manga series Food Wars!: Shokugeki no Soma
- Hisako Fuchita, guitarist of Girls Dead Monster in the anime Angel Beats!
