= Next Level =

Next Level may refer to:

- Next Level (arcade), a video arcade in Brooklyn, New York, US
- Next Level (film), a 2019 American dance film
- Devil's Double Next Level, a 2025 Indian horror comedy film by S. Prem Anand, fourth in the Dhilluku Dhuddu film series
- Next Level Church, Matthews, North Carolina, US
- Next Level Games, a Canadian video game developer

== Music ==
- Next Level (Aligator album), 2012
- Next Level (Ayumi Hamasaki album), 2009
  - "Next Level" (Ayumi Hamasaki song), the title song
- The Next Level, an album by Diljit Dosanjh, 2009
- "Next Level", a song by Mary J. Blige from My Life II... The Journey Continues (Act 1), 2011
- "Next Level", a song by Showbiz and A.G. from Goodfellas, 1995
- "Next Level", a song by YU-KI, theme song for Kamen Rider Kabuto, 2006
- "Next Level" (Aespa song), 2021
