= Seer (film) =

- Poster
- Release date: July 28, 2011 (China)
- Running time: 90 minutes
- Country: China
- Language: Mandarin
- Box office: CNY44.1 million

Seer (Chinese: 赛尔号大电影之寻找凤凰神兽) is a 2011 Chinese animated fantasy adventure film based on the online game of the same name. It is about robots on an airship called Seer where they travel to find a legendary phoenix in a vast universe, and they also must fight off evil space pirates who are blocking their way. It was released on July 28, 2011. The film is the first in a film series, being followed by Seer 2 (2012), Seer the Movie 3: Heroes Alliance (2013), Seer 4 (2014), Seer 5: Rise of Thunder (2015), Seer 6: Invincible Puni (2017), and Seer 7: Crazy Intelligence (2019).

== Reception ==
=== Box office ===
The film earned CN¥44.030 million at the Chinese box office.
