= Chinatown Fair =

Chinatown Fair Family Fun Center
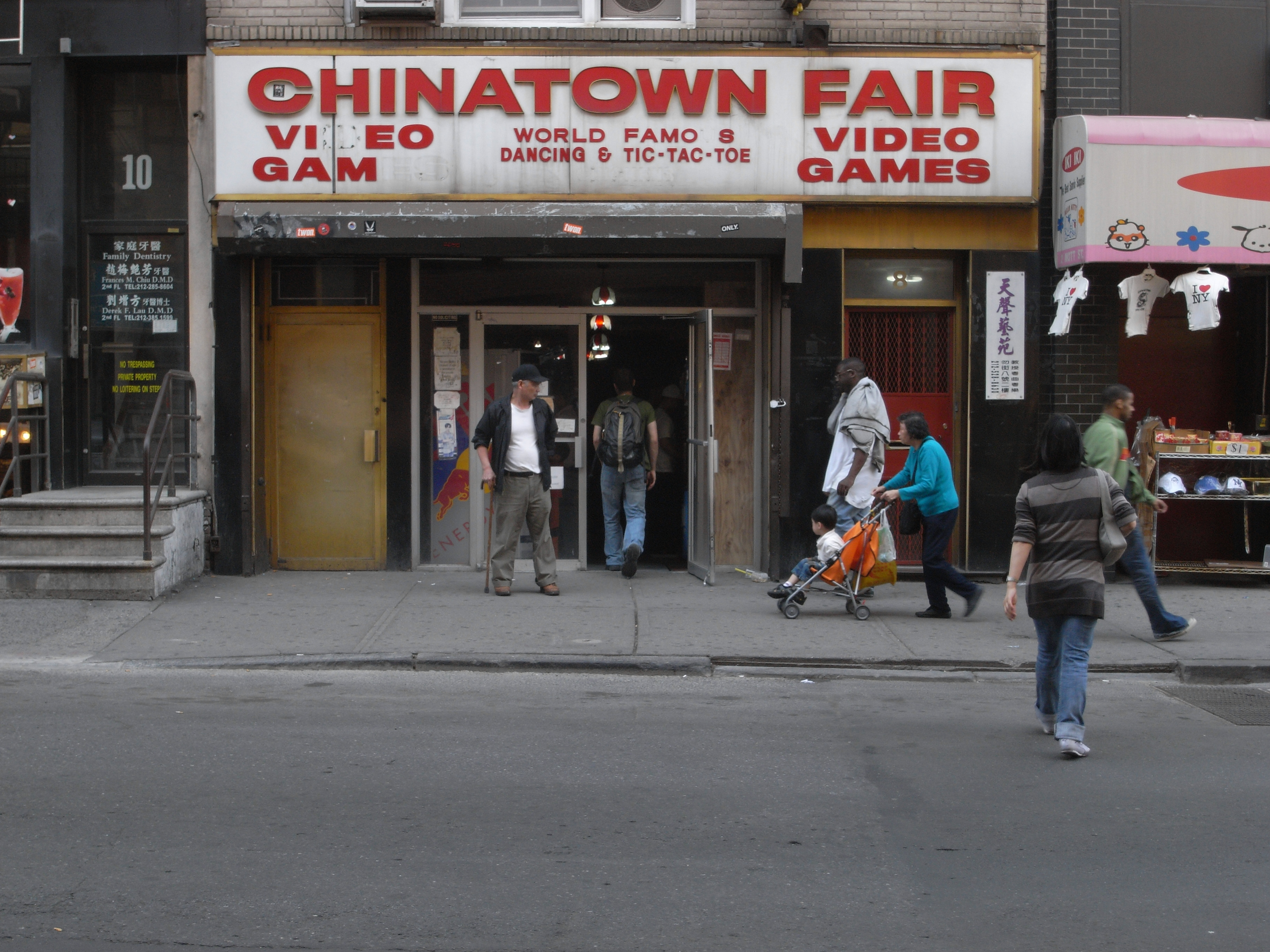
- Interactive map of the Chinatown Fair Family Fun Center area
- Former names: Chinatown Fair

General information
- Type: Video arcade
- Location: 8 Mott St, New York, NY 10038, Chinatown, Manhattan, New York City, United States
- Coordinates: 40.714009°N 73.998511°W
- Opened: 1944

Website
- www.chinatownfair.biz

Chinatown Fair Family Fun Center is a video arcade center located on Mott Street in Chinatown, Manhattan. Historically, the arcade catered toward competitive fighting games. The original arcade opened in 1944 and closed in February 2011, but reopened in May 2012 under different management. Chinatown Fair has been widely regarded as New York City's "last great arcade".

== History ==
Chinatown Fair opened in 1944, taking over the first floor of the popular Port Arthur Chinese Restaurant building located at 7-9 Mott Street in New York City; previously, the first floor had been occupied by Soy Kee & Co., exporters, as well as the Eastern Trading Company. Chinatown Fair operated as a penny arcade and small museum for many years, before becoming a video game arcade in the 1970s. Indian immigrant Sam Palmer purchased the business in 1982 after having a "religious vision".

One of its first attractions was a dancing chicken. The dancing chicken was later replaced with a tic-tac-toe playing chicken, which was retired in the early 2000s. In the 1970s and 1980s, the arcade hosted many retro generation games including Pac-Man and Space Invaders. In 1991, after the release of Street Fighter II: The World Warrior, Chinatown Fair switched focus to competitive fighting games. By the late 1990s Street Fighter, Marvel vs. Capcom, The King of Fighters, Soulcalibur, Tekken and other fighting games were commonly played. Top players such as Justin Wong, NYChrisG, Michael "Yipes" Mendoza, and Sanford Kelly frequented the establishment.

As of 2010, The New York Times wrote that Chinatown Fair was among the last video arcades in the city. Video arcades have been in decline with the rise of home video games. The newspaper reported that it became "a center for all the outcasts in the city to bond over their shared love" of classic arcade and fighting video games no longer popular in modern arcades, with titles including the original Street Fighter II (1991), The King of Fighters (1994), and Ms. Pac-Man. Other groups congregated around Dance Dance Revolution machines and racing games. Unlike the norm at other arcades, where winning players continue until deposed, Chinatown Fair players play a maximum of three or four continuous games.

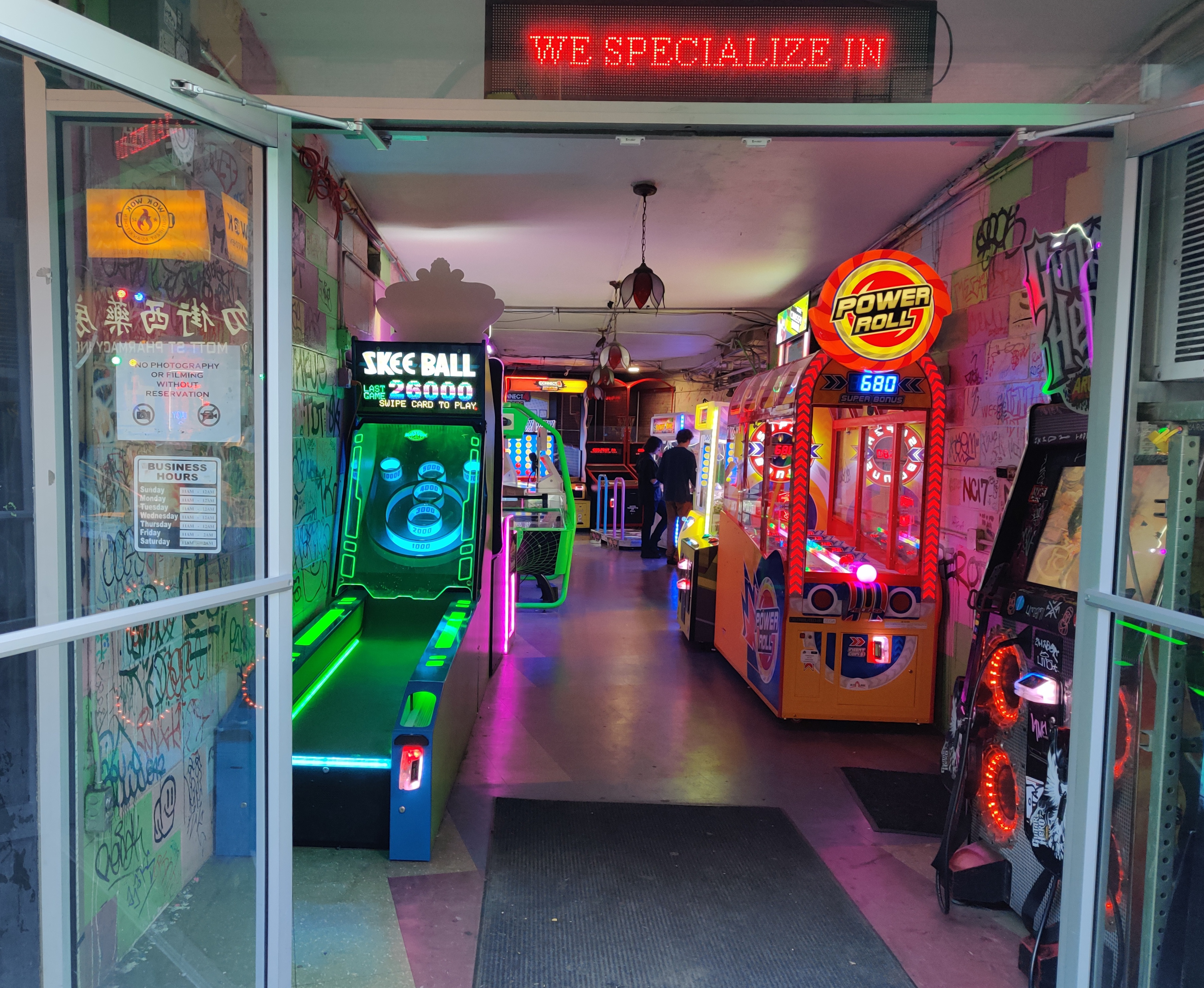
The interior of the arcade in 2020

In February 2011, Chinatown Fair closed down. On May 5, 2012 over a year later it reopened under a new name "Chinatown Fair Family Fun Center" with new manager and part owner, Lonnie Sobel. Former competitive players criticized the new arcade for catering toward casual players, with the new ownership explaining that they were targeting a new clientele. Competitive fighting game players relocated to Next Level, a Brooklyn arcade owned by Chinatown Fair's former manager, which opened in 2011.

== Media ==
In 2011, filmmaker Mark Hayes released Chinatown Fair, a short documentary capturing the period between the arcade's closing and re-opening.

In 2015, Chinatown Fair was the focus The Lost Arcade, a feature-length documentary. The Lost Arcade was released in New York City on August 12, 2016.
