= Nintendo Quest =

Nintendo Quest: The Most Unofficial and Unauthorized Nintendo Documentary Ever!
- Film poster
- Directed by: Rob McCallum
- Written by: Rob McCallum; Jordan Christopher Morris
- Produced by: Michael C. Froussios; Jordan Christopher Morris
- Starring: Jay Bartlett; Rob McCallum; Thor Aackerlund; Syd Bolton; Warren Davis; Patrick Scott Patterson; Walter Day
- Cinematography: Sarah Mulholland
- Edited by: Robert McCallum
- Music by: John H. McCarthy
- Production company: Pyre Productions USA
- Distributed by: Canamedia
- Release date: June 26, 2015 (United States)
- Running time: 92 minutes
- Countries: Canada; United States
- Language: English

Nintendo Quest: The Most Unofficial and Unauthorized Nintendo Documentary Ever! is a 2015 Canadian/American documentary road film directed by Rob McCallum about Jay Bartlett and his quest to acquire all 678 licensed Nintendo Entertainment System games within the span of 30 days, without purchasing any games online.

== Plot ==
The starting point of the film is when Jay Bartlett's friend Rob McCallum (executive producer) challenges him to acquire every one of the 678 NES games officially released in North America in just 30 days. The only caveat is that Jay can't buy anything from internet retailers. The film then follows Jay and Rob and the film crew as they travel south through the States visiting various second-hand stores and basements, some impressively stocked with mint-condition gaming relics. With online purchasing disallowed, Jay meets a world of persons sharing his enthusiasms, some who are more than happy to aid in his quest, while others comically get in the way. As his quest develops, the viewer is given a history lesson on Nintendo, and learns why this company's gaming software means so much to the filmmakers and the development of video gaming.

== Reception ==
Robert Workman of Geek & Sundry points out that in Nintendo Quest "the industry takes a backseat to instead focus on one man's ultimate nostalgia trip, in a tale that's just as much about the journey as it is the destination". Mike Diver of Vice Magazine describes the film as "a documentary on collecting with a difference", noting it "focuses exclusively on the catalogue of the Nintendo Entertainment System, probably the most important games console of all time, responsible for righting the industry's course after a colossal financial slump in the early 1980s and ultimately becoming a fixture in more American homes during the decade of Ronald Reagan and Molly Ringwald than casual racism" and that "it features a fantastically passionate Nintendo fan at its core, one Jay Bartlett, a Canadian with Bowser and Bomberman in his blood".
