= The Art of the Game =

- Film poster
- Directed by: Matthew Davis Walker
- Produced by: Ryan Lynch
- Production company: Story Developing
- Distributed by: Machinima
- Release date: 2014
- Language: English

The Art of the Game is an hour-long documentary film that explores the cultural importance of video gaming by following a group of students at the Academy of Art University in San Francisco as they compete for a job in the video game industry.

== Production ==
The film was produced by Story Developing and directed by Matthew Davis Walker who co-Produced Muscle Shoals and produced by Ryan Lynch. Music for the film was scored by Peder Gilham and Blake Atwell.

== Synopsis ==
The film features interview subjects such as Paola Antonelli of MoMA, Anthony Burch, Ashly Burch, Mattie Brice, and Randy Pitchford of Gearbox.

== Release ==
The film was available to view on Machinima's YouTube channel, as of 2015 the video is private and cannot be viewed on youtube. Prior to YouTube, the film was released May 8 on Machinima's Twitch Channel (Twitch/machinima) at 1 p.m. and 6 p.m. PDT. From May 9–11, the film could be seen on Xbox Live via Machinima's app on Xbox One and Xbox 360 dashboards.

== Critical reception ==
Forbes called the film an "evocative love letter to the video game industry."
