= Next Level Church =

Next Level Church is a church in Matthews, North Carolina, a Charlotte suburb. It was founded in 2005.

== History ==
Next Level Church started as a launch team in January 2005 at Park Church South in Pineville, North Carolina. Meetings were held on Sunday nights and drew around 40 people. The church held its first public worship service on Sunday morning September 11, 2005, in the gymnasium of Community House Middle School located in the Ballantyne area of Charlotte. Due to potential damage to the wooden gym floor, Next Level Church's lease was terminated in July 2006. The search for a new location yielded a campus with three buildings on 16 acres (65,000 m^{2}) and another church named Tri-County Community Church (TC3) in Matthews which was meeting weekly on Saturday nights. Next Level Church met in the Matthews facility for the first time on August 20, 2006. TC3 and Next Level merged into a single congregation under the name of Next Level Church.

In 2007, Next Level adopted Project 485, an ambitious plan to begin Next Level campuses near every exit of Interstate 485, the loop highway surrounding Charlotte. The first Project 485 campus, in the Ballantyne area, launched in February 2008, led by Campus Pastor Robbie McLaughlin.

On February 10, 2008. Next Level Church launched its second campus in the Ballantyne area of Charlotte.

== Church "planting" ==
Next Level planted a church in November 2006 known as The Journey, which meets within a few miles of uptown Charlotte. The lead pastor is Mark Griffith.

On January 28, 2007, Next Level planted a church called Element, led by Brian Phipps, along with Bill Babson and Frank Hamrick in the Southwest suburbs of Charlotte. Element had an attendance of approximately 330 on their first Sunday of public worship services.
