= Next Level (arcade) =

Video arcade center in the United States

- Interactive map of the Next Level area

General information
- Type: Video arcade
- Location: 874 4th Ave, Brooklyn, New York City, 11232, United States
- Coordinates: 40.6569°N 74.0022°W
- Opened: 2011
- Owner: Henry Cen

Next Level is a video arcade center located in Brooklyn, New York. The arcade is considered a spiritual successor to Chinatown Fair and the new "premier hub" of the United States competitive fighting game scene. Weekly tournaments at the arcade are live streamed.

The arcade opened in 2011 at 4013 8th Ave in Sunset Park, Brooklyn after Chinatown Fair closed down. It is owned and operated by former Chinatown Fair manager, Henry Cen. In July 2016, the arcade moved roughly 12 blocks north to 874 4th Ave after its lease expired at its original location. The arcade is featured in the 2015 film The Lost Arcade, a documentary about the arcade community in New York City.

== See also ==
- Video arcade
