= The Lost Arcade =

- Poster
- Directed by: Kurt Vincent
- Written by: Irene Chin
- Produced by: Irene Chin; Evan Krauss; Kyle Martin; Jason Orans; Alex Scilla; Joshua Y. Tsui
- Edited by: Aaron Crozier; Thomas Niles; Kurt Vincent
- Music by: Gil Talmi
- Production company: 26 Aries
- Release date: November 14, 2015 (DOC NYC)
- Running time: 79 minutes
- Country: United States
- Language: English

The Lost Arcade is a 2015 American documentary film about the influence of the Chinatown Fair arcade on the fighting game community and New York City as a whole. The film was directed by Kurt Vincent and produced by Irene Chin, with executive producers Evan Krauss, Kyle Martin, Jason Orans, Alex Scilla, and Joshua Y. Tsui. The documentary features multiple interviews with professional players, in addition to players connected with Chinatown Fair and the new arcade Next Level.

== Production ==
The film was initially funded via Kickstarter, with funds being raised in response to the news that the Chinatown Fair would be closing and the filmmakers wishing to capture its closing and tell the story of its history. Additional funding was provided by IGN Entertainment. It was originally titled ARCADE: The Last Night At Chinatown Fair. As depicted in the film, the project evolved when Chinatown Fair re-opened in a new form.

== Release ==
The film had its world premiere at the 2015 DOC NYC film festival and European premiere at the 2016 International Film Festival Rotterdam. The film was released in New York City on August 12, 2016, at the Metrograph.

The film began streaming on Amazon Prime Video in January 2019. In October 2019, Factory 25, Brooklyn based distributor of narratives and documentaries, added the film to its catalog.

== Reception ==
Reception to the film has been mildly positive. On the review aggregator website Rotten Tomatoes, 67% of 21 critics' reviews are positive, with an average rating of 5.9/10. Metacritic, which uses a weighted average, assigned the film a score of 66 out of 100, based on eight critics, indicating "generally favorable" reviews.

The New York Times called it "wholly enjoyable" and "a love letter to a vanished piece of New York, and a little wish for the future." The New Yorker called the film "raw and intimate." The Guardian referred to it as a "lyrical homage" and "a small gem of a film."

After being released on Amazon Prime Video, the documentary received a renewed level of interest, including a New York Times article in January 2019 that referred to the film as "a 2016 documentary about the arcade’s enduring legacy in the city."
