= Hisaya =

Hisaya is a masculine Japanese given name, a feminine Japanese given name and a surname. Notable people with the name include:

- Hisaya Morishige (森繁 久彌, 1913–2009), Japanese actor and comedian
- Hisaya Nakajo (中条 比紗也, 1973–2023), Japanese manga artist
- Hisaya Yoshimoto (吉本 久也, born 1973), Japanese weightlifter
- Naoki Hisaya (久弥 直樹), Japanese screenwriter

== See also ==
- Hisaya-ōdōri Station, train station in Naka-ku, Nagoya, Aichi Prefecture, Japan
