= Hisayo =

- Gender: Female

Origin
- Origin: Japanese
- Meaning: Different meanings depending on the kanji used

Hisayo (written: 久代, 久世, 寿代) is a feminine Japanese given name. Notable people with the name include:

- Hisayo Fukumitsu (福光 久代) (born 1960), Japanese high jumper
- Hisayo Mochizuki (望月 久代) (born 1978), Japanese voice actress
- Rowan Hisayo Buchanan, American-British writer
- Hisayo Chikusa (千種 寿代) (born 1962), Japanese sport shooter
- Hisayo Momose (百瀬 寿代), Japanese electrical engineer

== See also ==
- 5354 Hisayo, main-belt asteroid
