= Hisae =

- Gender: Female

Origin
- Origin: Japanese
- Meaning: Different meanings depending on the kanji used

Hisae (written: 久江, 久恵, 寿恵 or ヒサエ in katakana) is a feminine Japanese given name. Notable people with the name include:

- Hisae Imai (今井 寿恵; 1931–2009), Japanese photographer
- Hisae Iwaoka (岩岡 ヒサエ; born 1976), Japanese manga artist
- Hisae Sawachi (澤地 久枝;born 1930), Japanese writer and activist
- Hisae Yanase (1943–2019), Spain-based Japanese ceramist
- Hisae Yoshizawa (吉澤 久恵; born 1966), Japanese football referee
