= Seer 2 =

- Poster
- Directed by: Wang Zhangjun; Fu Jie
- Starring: Philip Lau; Jie Zhang; Yico Zeng
- Production company: Mr.Cartoon Pictures Shanghai Taomee Network Technology Ltd. EE-Media Hunan Aniworld Satellite TV 37 Entertainment
- Distributed by: China Film Co., Ltd.
- Release date: June 28, 2012 (China)
- Running time: 90 minutes
- Country: China
- Language: Mandarin
- Box office: CN¥31.2 million

Seer 2 (Chinese: 赛尔号大电影2之雷伊与迈尔斯) is a 2012 Chinese animated fantasy adventure film based on an online game of the same name. The film is part of a film series, being preceded by Seer (2011) and followed by Seer 3: Heroes Alliance (2013). It was released on June 28, 2012.

== Voice cast ==
- Philip Lau
- Jie Zhang
- Zeng Yike

== Reception ==
=== Box office ===
The film earned CN¥31.166 million at the Chinese box office.
