= Seer 4 =

- Directed by: Wang Zhangjun; Yin Yuqi
- Starring: Yang Ou; Zhang Anqi; Fan Junhang; Meng Xianglong; You Jun; Yuan Guoqing; Su Xin; Jia Zhichao; Xia Lei; Liu Qin; Yang Menglu
- Release date: 10 July 2014
- Running time: 86 minutes
- Country: China
- Language: Mandarin
- Box office: US$9,180,000

Seer 4 (Chinese: 赛尔号大电影4：圣魔之战) is a 2014 Chinese animated children's adventure film directed by Wang Zhangjun and Yin Yuqi and based on an online game of the same name. It was released on 10 July 2014. The film is part of a film series, being preceded by Seer the Movie 3: Heroes Alliance (2013) and followed by Seer 5: Rise of Thunder (2015).

== Roles ==
=== Heroes Alliance ===
- Ray (雷伊, 雷伊)
- Gaia (蓋亞, 盖亚)
- Cassius (卡修斯, 卡修斯)
- Blacke (布萊克, 布莱克)
- Muse (繆斯, 缪斯)

== Cast ==
- Yang Ou
- Zhang Anqi
- Fan Junhang
- Meng Xianglong
- You Jun
- Yuan Guoqing
- Su Xin
- Jia Zhichao
- Xia Lei
- Liu Qin
- Yang Menglu

== Reception ==
The film has grossed US$9.18 million in China.
