= Seer 5: Rise of Thunder =

Seer Movie 5: Rise of Thunder
- Poster
- 赛尔号大电影5：雷神崛起
- Directed by: Zhangjun Wang
- Starring: Yuting Luo; Wei Zhai; Xiaotong Wang; Ye Sun; Lei Wu; Ke Jiang; Beichen Liu; Ye Li
- Production companies: Shanghai Taomi Animation; Beijing Enlight Media; Beijing Iqiyi; Beijing KAKU Cartoon Satellite TV
- Distributed by: Beijing Enlight Media
- Release date: July 23, 2015
- Running time: 90 minutes
- Country: China
- Language: Mandarin
- Box office: CN¥56.6 million

Seer Movie 5: Rise of Thunder (Chinese: 赛尔号大电影5：雷神崛起) is a 2015 Chinese animated children's adventure drama film directed by Zhangjun Wang. The film is part of the Seer film series, following Seer 4 (2014). The film was released on July 23, 2015.

== Voice cast ==
- Yuting Luo
- Wei Zhai
- Xiaotong Wang
- Ye Sun
- Lei Wu
- Ke Jiang
- Beichen Liu
- Ye Li

== Reception ==
The film earned CN¥56.580 million at the Chinese box office.
