= Seer 3: Heroes Alliance =

Seer the Movie 3: Heroes Alliance
- Poster
- Directed by: Wang Zhangjun; Yin Yuqi
- Starring: Yang Ou; Zhang Anqi; Fan Junhang; Su Xin; Jia Zhichao; Liu Qin; Xia Lei; Yang Menglu; Meng Xianglong; You Jun
- Production company: Shanghai Taomee Animation Limited
- Distributed by: Enlight Pictures
- Release date: 12 July 2013
- Running time: 103 minutes
- Country: China
- Language: Mandarin
- Box office: ¥76.3 million

Seer the Movie 3: Heroes Alliance (Chinese: 赛尔号大电影3之战神联盟) is a 2013 Chinese animated adventure film directed by Wang Zhangjun and Yin Yuqi and based on an online game of the same name. The film is part of a film series, being preceded by Seer 2 (2012) and followed by Seer 4 (2014). It was released on 12 July 2013.

== Roles ==
=== Heroes Alliance ===
Ray (雷伊, 雷伊)

Gaia (蓋亞, 盖亚)

Cassius (卡修斯, 卡修斯)

Blacke (布萊克, 布莱克)

Miris (米瑞斯, 米瑞斯)

== Cast ==
- Yang Ou
- Zhang Anqi
- Fan Junhang
- Su Xin
- Jia Zhichao
- Liu Qin
- Xia Lei
- Yang Menglu
- Meng Xianglong
- You Jun

== Reception ==
The film grossed ¥76.3 million in China.
