= Xavier Pérez Grobet =

Mexican cinematographer (born 1964)

- Born: 12 October 1964 (age 61); Mexico City
- Years active: 1989–present

Xavier Pérez Grobet (born 12 October 1964) is a Mexican cinematographer.

He is a member of the American Society of Cinematographers (ASC) and the Mexican Society of Cinematographers (AMC).

== Early life and family ==
Pérez Grobet was born in Mexico City on 12 October 1964 to an architect father and to photographer Lourdes Grobet.

== Career ==
Pérez Grobet began his career in Mexico and later relocated to Los Angeles, where he photographed features and television across the U.S. and Europe.

In The White Lotus season 2 episode "Bull Elephants," a visual homage to Antonioni's L'Avventura was attributed to Pérez Grobet's suggestion, according to Variety's episode report.

== Filmography ==
=== Short film ===
Director/Writer/Editor

- Chapultepec (1987) (Documentary short)

Cinematographer

Year	Title	Director	Notes
1989	Entrada de la noche	Pablo Gómez Sáenz	
1991	La pelota que rebota	Jorge Pellicer	Documentary short
1996	¿Por qué nosotros no?	Jaime Humberto Hermosillo	
2004	Alone	Gregory Orr	
2013	The Incident	David Ariniello; Nicolas Citton	
2018	All We Are	Will Stewart	

=== Feature film ===
Year	Title	Director	Notes
1991	La mujer de Benjamín	Carlos Carrera	
1991	Dentro de la noche	José Luis García Agraz	
1992	Tres son peor que una	Juan Antonio de la Riva	
1993	La vida conyugal	Carlos Carrera	
1993	El triste juego del amor	Juan Antonio de la Riva	
1994	Vagabunda	Alfonso Rosas Priego hijo	
1994	Amorosos fantasmas	Carlos García Agraz	
1995	Sin remitente	Carlos Carrera	
1995	Algunas nubes	Carlos García Agraz	Cameo role: "Fotografo"
1995	Tres minutos en la oscuridad	Pablo Gómez Sáenz	
1996	Julio y su ángel	Jorge Cervera Jr.	
1996	Love Always	Judith Pauline Artenstein	With Stephen Lighthill
1997	De noche vienes, Esmeralda	Jaime Humberto Hermosillo	
1999	Santitos	Alejandro Springall	
1999	Sexo, pudor y lágrimas	Antonio Serrano	With Sebastian del Amo
2000	Before Night Falls	Julian Schnabel	With Guillermo Rosas
2001	Tortilla Soup	María Ripoll	
2002	Bear's Kiss	Sergei Bodrov	
2003	Lucía, Lucía	Antonio Serrano	
2003	Chasing Papi	Linda Mendoza	
2004	The Woodsman	Nicole Kassell	
2004	Cavedweller	Lisa Cholodenko	
2005	Nine Lives	Rodrigo García	
2006	Monster House	Gil Kenan	
2006	Nacho Libre	Jared Hess	
2007	Music and Lyrics	Marc Lawrence	
2008	City of Ember	Gil Kenan	
2009	I Love You Phillip Morris	Glenn Ficarra; John Requa	
2009	Mother and Child	Rodrigo García	
2010	The Back-up Plan	Alan Poul	
2012	What to Expect When You're Expecting	Kirk Jones	
2013	Enough Said	Nicole Holofcener	
2015	Focus	Glenn Ficarra; John Requa	
2016	Whiskey Tango Foxtrot	Glenn Ficarra; John Requa	
2017	Brad's Status	Mike White	Cameo role: "Xavier"
2019	Intolerance: No More	Sergio Guerrero	Also credited as executive producer
2024	Riff Raff	Dito Montiel	
2027	Honeymoon with Harry	Glenn Ficarra; John Requa	

Documentary film

Year	Title	Director	Notes
1995	La pasión de Iztapalapa	Nicolás Echevarría	Shared credit with Nicolás Echevarría
1996	Los años Arruza	Emilio Maillé	
1997	Un Buñuel mexican	Emilio Maillé	Shared credit with Emilio Maillé, Jean-Michel Humeau and Damien Morisot
2000	Blossoms of Fire	Maureen Gosling; Ellen Osborne	
2013	Bering. Equilibrio y Resistencia	Lourdes Grobet	
2022	Bering, Family Reunion	Lourdes Grobet	

=== Television ===
Year	Title	Director	Notes
1990	La hora marcada	Hugo Rodríguez	Episode "Cuándo fué"
2004	Deadwood	Michael Engler; Daniel Minahan; Ed Bianchi; Steve Shill	4 episodes
2006	Big Love	Rodrigo García	Episode "Pilot" (With James Glennon)
2008	In Treatment	Rodrigo García	5 episodes
2008	Swingtown	Alan Poul	Episode "Pilot"
2010	Scoundrels	Julie Anne Robinson; Michael Katleman	4 episodes
2011-2013	Enlightened		17 episdoes
2013	Back in the Game	Glenn Ficarra; John Requa	Episode "Pilot"
2014	Jane the Virgin	Brad Silberling	Episode "Chapter One"
2014	Marco Polo	Daniel Minahan	Episodes "Hashshashin" and "White Moon"
2015	Looking	Andrew Haigh; Ryan Fleck; Jamie Babbit; Craig Johnson	Season 2
2017	Making History	Jared Hess	Episode "Pilot"
2017	Dynasty	Brad Silberling	Episode "I Hardly Recognized You"
2018	Sorry for Your Loss		Season 1
2021	Them	Nelson Cragg; Craig William Macneill; Ti West	5 episodes
2022	The White Lotus	Mike White	Season 2
2025	The Chi	Hannah Bang; Stacy Pascal Gaspard; Deondray Gossfield; Quincy LeNear Gossfield; Haley Elizabeth Anderson	4 episodes
2026	Sugar	Amat Escalante	Episodes "Watch Face" and "Off 15"

TV movies

Year	Title	Director
2001	In the Time of the Butterflies	Mariano Barroso
2003	A Painted House	Alfonso Arau
2011	I Hate That I Love You	Nicole Holofcener
2016	Looking	Andrew Haigh

Miniseries

Year	Title	Director	Notes
2019	Unbelievable	Michael Dinner	3 episodes
2019	Watchmen	Stephen Williams; Steph Green; David Semel	3 episodes
2022	WeCrashed	Glenn Ficarra; John Requa; Tinge Krishnan	4 episodes

== Awards and nominations ==
Year	Award	Category	Title	Result	Ref.
2019	Primetime Emmy Awards	Outstanding Cinematography for a Limited Series	Watchmen (For episode "Little Fear of Lightning")	Nominated	
