= Critics' Choice Movie Award for Best Comedy =

Award given by the Broadcast Film Critics Association

The Critics' Choice Movie Award for Best Comedy is one of the awards given to people working in the motion picture industry by the Broadcast Film Critics Association.

== List of winners and nominees ==
=== 2000s ===
Year	Winner	Director(s)
2005	The 40-Year-Old Virgin	Judd Apatow
2005	Kiss Kiss Bang Bang	Shane Black
2005	Mrs Henderson Presents	Stephen Frears
2005	The Producers	Susan Stroman
2005	Wedding Crashers	David Dobkin
2006	Borat	Larry Charles
2006	The Devil Wears Prada	David Frankel
2006	For Your Consideration	Christopher Guest
2006	Little Miss Sunshine	Jonathan Dayton and Valerie Faris
2006	Thank You for Smoking	Jason Reitman
2007	Juno	Jason Reitman
2007	Dan in Real Life	Peter Hedges
2007	Hairspray	Adam Shankman
2007	Knocked Up	Judd Apatow
2007	Superbad	Greg Mottola
2008	Tropic Thunder	Ben Stiller
2008	Burn After Reading	Joel Coen and Ethan Coen
2008	Forgetting Sarah Marshall	Nicholas Stoller
2008	Role Models	David Wain
2008	Vicky Cristina Barcelona	Woody Allen
2009	The Hangover	Todd Phillips
2009	(500) Days of Summer	Marc Webb
2009	It's Complicated	Nancy Meyers
2009	The Proposal	Anne Fletcher
2009	Zombieland	Ruben Fleischer

=== 2010s ===
Year	Winner	Director(s)
2010	Easy A	Will Gluck
2010	Cyrus	Jay Duplass and Mark Duplass
2010	Date Night	Shawn Levy
2010	Get Him to the Greek	Nicholas Stoller
2010	I Love You Phillip Morris	Glenn Ficarra and John Requa
2010	The Other Guys	Adam McKay
2011	Bridesmaids	Paul Feig
2011	Crazy, Stupid, Love	Glenn Ficarra and John Requa
2011	Horrible Bosses	Seth Gordon
2011	Midnight in Paris	Woody Allen
2011	The Muppets	James Bobin
2012	Silver Linings Playbook	David O. Russell
2012	21 Jump Street	Phil Lord and Christopher Miller
2012	Bernie	Richard Linklater
2012	Ted	Seth MacFarlane
2012	This Is 40	Judd Apatow
2013	American Hustle	David O. Russell
2013	Enough Said	Nicole Holofcener
2013	The Heat	Paul Feig
2013	This Is the End	Seth Rogen and Evan Goldberg
2013	The Way, Way Back	Nat Faxon and Jim Rash
2013	The World's End	Edgar Wright
2014	The Grand Budapest Hotel	Wes Anderson
2014	22 Jump Street	Phil Lord and Christopher Miller
2014	Birdman	Alejandro G. Iñárritu
2014	St. Vincent	Theodore Melfi
2014	Top Five	Chris Rock
2015	The Big Short	Adam McKay
2015	Inside Out	Pete Docter
2015	Joy	David O. Russell
2015	Sisters	Jason Moore
2015	Spy	Paul Feig
2015	Trainwreck	Judd Apatow
2016	Deadpool	Tim Miller
2016	Central Intelligence	Rawson Marshall Thurber
2016	Don't Think Twice	Mike Birbiglia
2016	The Edge of Seventeen	Kelly Fremon Craig
2016	Hail, Caesar!	Joel Coen and Ethan Coen
2016	The Nice Guys	Shane Black
2017	The Big Sick	Michael Showalter
2017	The Disaster Artist	James Franco
2017	Girls Trip	Malcolm D. Lee
2017	I, Tonya	Craig Gillespie
2017	Lady Bird	Greta Gerwig
2018	Crazy Rich Asians	Jon M. Chu
2018	Deadpool 2	David Leitch
2018	The Death of Stalin	Armando Iannucci
2018	The Favourite	Yorgos Lanthimos
2018	Game Night	John Francis Daley and Jonathan Goldstein
2018	Sorry to Bother You	Boots Riley
2019	Dolemite Is My Name	Craig Brewer
2019	Booksmart	Olivia Wilde
2019	The Farewell	Lulu Wang
2019	Jojo Rabbit	Taika Waititi
2019	Knives Out	Rian Johnson

=== 2020s ===
Year	Winner	Director(s)
2020	Palm Springs	Max Barbakow
2020	Borat Subsequent Moviefilm	Jason Woliner
2020	The 40-Year-Old Version	Radha Blank
2020	The King of Staten Island	Judd Apatow
2020	On the Rocks	Sofia Coppola
2020	The Prom	Ryan Murphy
2021	Licorice Pizza	Paul Thomas Anderson
2021	Barb and Star Go to Vista Del Mar	Josh Greenbaum
2021	Don't Look Up	Adam McKay
2021	Free Guy	Shawn Levy
2021	The French Dispatch	Wes Anderson
2022	Glass Onion: A Knives Out Mystery	Rian Johnson
2022	The Banshees of Inisherin	Martin McDonagh
2022	Bros	Nicholas Stoller
2022	Everything Everywhere All at Once	Daniel Kwan and Daniel Scheinert
2022	Triangle of Sadness	Ruben Östlund
2022	The Unbearable Weight of Massive Talent	Tom Gormican
2023	Barbie	Greta Gerwig
2023	American Fiction	Cord Jefferson
2023	Bottoms	Emma Seligman
2023	The Holdovers	Alexander Payne
2023	No Hard Feelings	Gene Stupnitsky
2023	Poor Things	Yorgos Lanthimos
2024	A Real Pain (TIE)	Jesse Eisenberg
2024	Deadpool & Wolverine (TIE)	Shawn Levy
2024	Hit Man	Richard Linklater
2024	My Old Ass	Megan Park
2024	Saturday Night	Jason Reitman
2024	Thelma	Josh Margolin
2025	The Naked Gun	Akiva Schaffer
2025	The Ballad of Wallis Island	James Griffiths
2025	Eternity	David Freyne
2025	Friendship	Andrew DeYoung
2025	The Phoenician Scheme	Wes Anderson
2025	Splitsville	Michael Angelo Covino

== Multiple wins ==
2 wins

- David O. Russell

== Multiple nominations ==
5 nominations

- Judd Apatow (one win)

3 nominations

- Wes Anderson (one win)
- Paul Feig (one win)
- Shawn Levy (one win)
- Adam McKay (one win)
- Jason Reitman (one win)
- David O. Russell (two wins)
- Nicholas Stoller

2 nominations

- Woody Allen
- Shane Black
- Joel Coen and Ethan Coen
- Glenn Ficarra and John Requa
- Greta Gerwig (one win)
- Rian Johnson (one win)
- Yorgos Lanthimos
- Richard Linklater
- Phil Lord and Christopher Miller
