= Scott Takeda =

American journalist

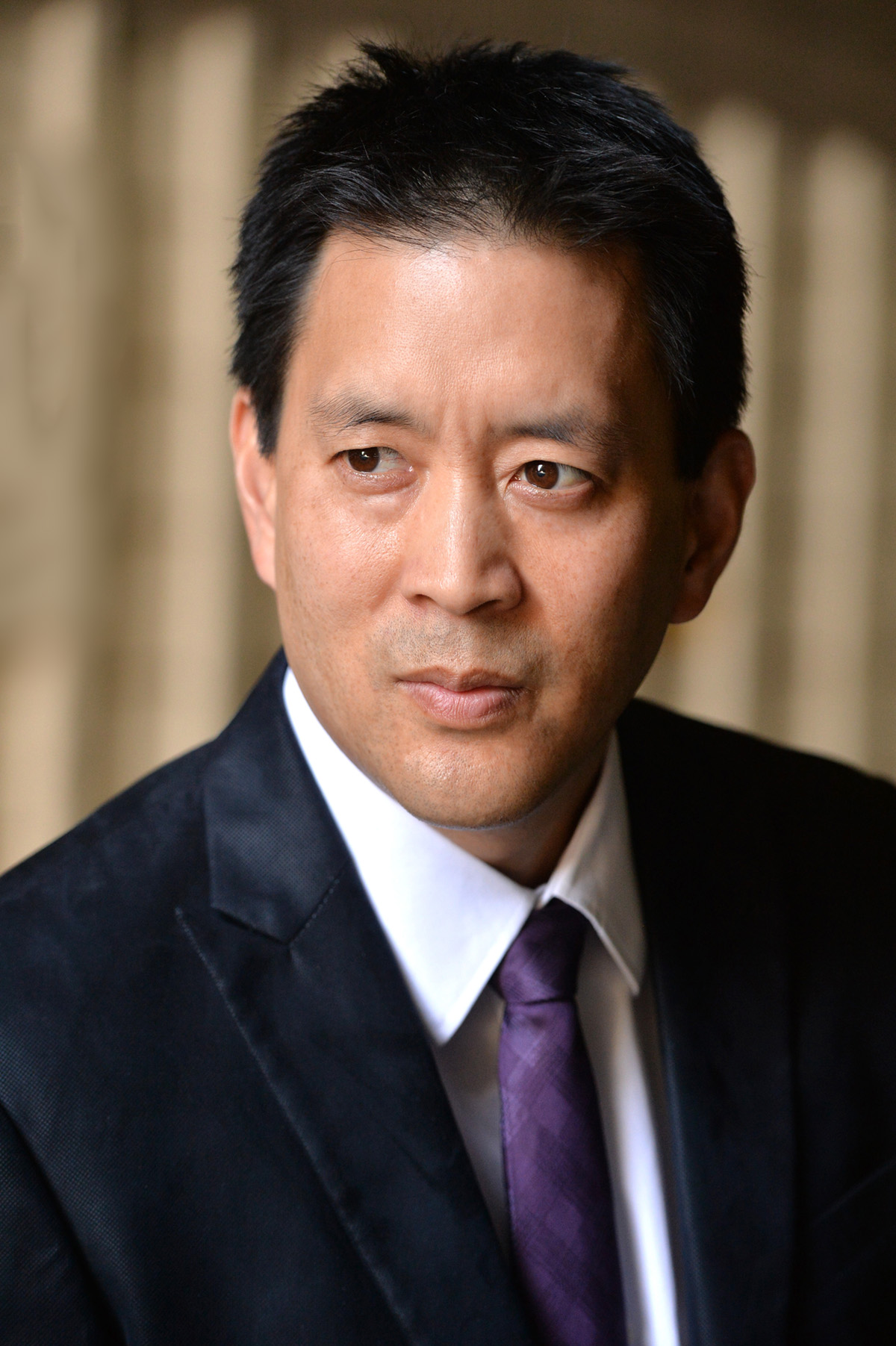
- Takeda in 2014
- Born: March 21, 1967 (age 59); Fort Collins, Colorado, U.S.
- Education: University of Colorado Boulder
- Occupations: Actor, filmmaker, photographer
- Years active: 1990–present
- Spouse: Lori Allred
- Website: scotttakeda.com

Scott Takeda (born March 21, 1967) is an American actor, filmmaker and photographer. He is known for his recurring roles on the soap operas Days of Our Lives (2016–17, as Dr. Lee) and General Hospital (2019–21, as Judge Lowe), and for appearances in films such as Everything Must Go (2010), Dallas Buyers Club (2013), Gone Girl (2014), Whiskey Tango Foxtrot (2016), The Space Between Us (2017), and The Tale (2018).

== Early life and education ==
Takeda was born and raised in Fort Collins, Colorado. He is of Japanese descent. He earned a bachelor of science in journalism at the University of Colorado in Boulder.

== Career ==
=== Broadcast journalism ===
Takeda began his career on-camera as a television news reporter in Pocatello, Idaho in 1990, before transitioning to producing for stations in Toledo, Ohio; Philadelphia, Pennsylvania; and Denver, Colorado. He worked as a photojournalist/producer for the CBS-owned television station KCNC in Denver, from 1992 until 1994. From 1995 to 1997, he was a producer and director for the syndicated children's show News-for-Kids.

=== Acting ===
Takeda's television acting debut came with a guest star role on Easy Money on The CW in 2009. He later played the character of Stella's father, Mr. Yamada, in the 2011 Disney Channel TV movie Lemonade Mouth. In 2015, he guest starred on the television series American Crime (ABC), The Messengers (The CW) and Grimm (NBC), as well as Halt and Catch Fire on AMC, Drop Dead Diva (Lifetime) and Star-Crossed (The CW) in 2014.

Takeda portrayed a bank manager in the film Everything Must Go (2010), starring Will Ferrell; Mr. Yamata in Dallas Buyers Club (2013), directed by Jean-Marc Vallée and starring Matthew McConaughey and Jared Leto; and a television producer in Gone Girl (2014), directed by David Fincher and starring Ben Affleck and Rosamund Pike. He appeared in the 2016 film Whiskey Tango Foxtrot, directed by Glenn Ficarra and John Requa, produced by Lorne Michaels, and starring Tina Fey, Margot Robbie, Martin Freeman, Billy Bob Thornton and Alfred Molina. He filmed two supporting roles where his scenes were ultimately cut: in Fair Game (2010), starring Naomi Watts and Sean Penn, and Little Fockers (2010), starring Robert De Niro, Ben Stiller and Owen Wilson. Takeda appears in the film The Tale, directed by Jennifer Fox and starring Laura Dern, which premiered at the 2018 Sundance Film Festival.

Takeda is a SAG-AFTRA actor. He studied improvisational comedy with the Upright Citizens Brigade in Los Angeles. He performs regularly with an improv troupe in Denver. In 2014, he starred in Working Together, an improv show stylized like a 1990s sitcom that premiered at the Voodoo Comedy Playhouse in Denver, and had a 2015 run at The Box Performance Space in Albuquerque, New Mexico. He was the keynote speaker at the University of Colorado's CU Boulder Asian Graduation Celebration on May 6, 2017.

=== Filmmaking and photography ===
Takeda runs Takeda Entertainment, a production company that produces corporate films and documentaries, including the Emmy-nominated 1996 documentary The Holocaust: Colorado Remembers, which he wrote, directed and produced. In 2016, Takeda and his filmmaking partners at BS Filmworks signed an agreement with ShortsTV for US television distribution of their short film If Not Now. ShortsTV also purchased US and international distribution rights for the BS Filmworks short The Decision. Both films were directed by Lori Allred and produced by Takeda and Brock Sherman. Takeda's 2017 short film The Outsider, which he wrote, directed and starred in, and produced with Allred and Sherman, premiered at the Denver Film Festival in November 2017, and was named runner-up for the True Grit Award for Colorado Filmmakers. The Outsider is distributed through ShortsTV. In 2019, Takeda and Allred held a cast and crew screening for their upcoming short film Remembering Us at the Sie Film Center in Denver. The film is about the struggles surrounding traumatic brain injuries. Remembering Us premiered at the Breckenridge Film Festival in September 2020. In 2020, Takeda and Allred opened up a new production company for their films called Wine Dog Pictures.

As a still photographer, he has exhibited his work at galleries around Colorado, and had a show at the Split Gallery in Croatia in 2015. He did a segment on KUSA-TV's 9News in 2016, showing photos from his Scene Street Story collection and offering photography tips to viewers.

== Personal life ==
Takeda lives in Denver, Colorado, with his producer wife, Lori Allred.

== Awards ==
- Idaho State Broadcasters Association Photographer of the Year, 1990
- Ohio News Photographer of the Year, 1992
- Winner, Heartland Regional Emmy, Target Audience Program, News for Kids – Kids Make a Difference, KCNC Denver, 1996
- Winner, Heartland Regional Emmy, Youth/Children's Program, News for Kids – Halloween, KCNC Denver, 1997
- Nominee, Heartland Regional Emmy, Best Informational/Instructional Program, The Holocaust: Colorado Remembers, KCNC, Denver, producer, 1998
- Nominee, Heartland Regional Emmy, Commercial – Single Spot, "ABC Custom Framing – Image", Short Sirkit Creative, producer/director, 2005
- Winner, Heartland Regional Emmy, Musical Composition/Arrangement, "U-Hills Plaza – 2005 Image", Short Sirkit Creative, writer, 2006
- Nominee, Heartland Regional Emmy, Community/Public Service (PSA) – Campaign, "Optimum Wellness 2007 – Healthy Eating Campaign", creative director / director, 2008
- Winner, Heartland Regional Emmy, Advanced Media – Commercial, "Western Dairy Association Image 2008", producer/writer, 2009
- Winner, Heartland Regional Emmy, Informational/Instructional Feature/Segment, "Pizza Day – A Win-Win For Everybody", director/writer, 2010
- Nominee, Heartland Chapter Emmy, Public/Current/Community Affairs Feature/Segment, "Have You Been Tested?", director, 2011
- Winner, Suncoast Emmy, Human Interest – News, "Melissa's Story", director, 2015
- Runner-up, True Grit Award for Colorado Filmmakers, Denver Film Festival, 2017

== Filmography ==
=== Film ===
| Year | Title | Role | Notes |
|---|---|---|---|
| 2004 | Fall River | Zach | |
| 2005 | 11:59 | Newsroom Journalist | |
| 2008 | Text | Dr. Tanaka | |
| 2010 | Everything Must Go | Bank Manager | |
| 2010 | Fair Game | Dr. Jonas | Director's cut |
| 2011 | Last Call | Don | Short film |
| 2013 | The Dysfunctional Dynamics | The Violet Avenger | Short film |
| 2013 | Dallas Buyers Club | Mr. Yamata | |
| 2013 | Dark Around the Stars | Natto | |
| 2014 | Gone Girl | TV Producer | |
| 2015 | Code of Honor | Attorney Ito | |
| 2016 | Whiskey Tango Foxtrot | Ed Faber | |
| 2017 | The Space Between Us | Dr. Gary Loh | |
| 2017 | The Outsider | Brett | Short film; also writer and director |
| 2018 | The Tale | Master of Ceremonies | |
| 2020 | A Deadly Price For Her Pretty Face | Mr. Mobely | |
| 2021 | Silk Road | Bank Manager Bob | Scenes deleted |
| 2025 | Control Freak | Dr. Chen | |

=== Television / Web series ===
| Year | Title | Role | Notes |
|---|---|---|---|
| 2009 | Easy Money | Dr. Shan Jing | Season 1, episode 6 |
| 2011 | Lemonade Mouth | Mr. Yamada | Disney Channel TV movie |
| 2011 | The Secret Lives of Wives | Dr. Fung | Lifetime TV movie |
| 2013 | Overlook, NM | Chief of Police Bob Tanaka | Season 1, episodes 1–4 |
| 2014 | Star-Crossed | Dr. Lerner | Season 1, episode 7 |
| 2014 | Nashville | Dr. Lau | Season 2, episode 20 |
| 2014 | Drop Dead Diva | Captain Nasami | Season 6, episode 13 |
| 2014 | Halt and Catch Fire | Hirohiko Taketa | Season 1, episode 5 |
| 2014 | Paranormal Pizza | Roger | Web series |
| 2015 | The Messengers | Han Lin | Season 1, episode 6 |
| 2015 | American Crime | Mike Narasaki | Season 1, episode 8 |
| 2015 | Grimm | Mr. Adams | Season 4, episode 22 |
| 2016 | Devious Maids | Dr. Brooks | Season 4, episode 5 |
| 2016 | The Night Shift | Tom Jeng | Season 3, episode 4 |
| 2017 | Days of Our Lives | Dr. Lee | Season 52, recurring |
| 2017 | Grey's Anatomy | ND Attending | Season 13, episode 12 |
| 2017 | Stalked by My Ex | Rich | Lifetime TV movie |
| 2018 | Drunk History | Japanese Man | Season 5, episode 1 |
| 2018 | The Man in the High Castle | Mr. Kobayashi | Season 3, episode 9 |
| 2018 | The Americans | David Sato | Season 6, episode 3 |
| 2018 | Preacher | Hiroki Matsukata | Season 3, episode 8 |
| 2018 | The First | Todd Hikari | Season 1, recurring |
| 2018 | Mr. Mercedes | Dr. Marley | Season 2, episode 10 |
| 2019 | The Resident | Dr. Xavier Lee | Season 2, episode 23 |
| 2019 | Dynasty | Mr. Han | Season 3, episode 3 |
| 2019-21 | General Hospital | Judge Richard Lowe | Seasons 57-59, recurring |
| 2020 | Messiah | Mr. Mishida | Season 1, episode 6 |
| 2020 | Model Citizen | Mr. Mobley | Lifetime TV movie |
| 2020 | Once Upon a Main Street | Billy | Lifetime TV movie |
| 2021 | High School Musical: The Musical: The Series | Menkies Judge | Season 2, recurring |
| 2021 | Sweet Pecan Summer | Tom Lin | Hallmark TV movie |
| 2021 | The Premise | Doctor Hopkins | Season 1, episode 1 |
| 2021 | A Picture Perfect Holiday | Bill | Lifetime TV movie |
| 2022 | Sprung | Trooper Williams | Season 1, episode 10 |
