= The Taliban Shuffle =

2011 book by Kim Barker

The Taliban Shuffle: Strange Days in Afghanistan and Pakistan
- First edition
- Author: Kim Barker
- Audio read by: Kirsten Potter
- Set in: Afghanistan; Pakistan
- Published: 2011
- Publisher: Doubleday
- Pages: 320
- ISBN: 0-385-53331-4

The Taliban Shuffle: Strange Days in Afghanistan and Pakistan is a memoir by American journalist Kim Barker about her experiences reporting in Pakistan and Afghanistan. It was published in 2011.

== Reception ==
BookBrowse rated the book 4/5.

== Film adaptation ==
In February 2014, American actress Tina Fey confirmed that her production company, Little Stranger, would be adapting the book into a film, which was released in March 2016. Fey stars in the film, which was produced by Lorne Michaels and written by Robert Carlock. Paramount hired Glenn Ficarra and John Requa to direct the film. It co-stars Margot Robbie, Martin Freeman, Billy Bob Thornton, and Alfred Molina.
