= Miles Robbins =

American actor (born 1992)

- Born: Miles Guthrie Tomalin Robbins; May 4, 1992 (age 34); New York City, U.S.
- Occupation: Actor
- Parents: Tim Robbins (father); Susan Sarandon (mother)
- Relatives: Jack Henry Robbins (brother); Eva Amurri (half-sister); Gil Robbins (grandfather)

Miles Guthrie Tomalin Robbins (born May 4, 1992) is an American actor.

== Early life ==
Miles Guthrie Tomalin Robbins was born on May 4, 1992, in New York City, a son of the actors Tim Robbins and Susan Sarandon (née Tomalin). His half-sister is the actress Eva Amurri, and his older brother is director Jack Henry Robbins.

== Career ==
In The X-Files, Robbins played William, the teenage son of Dana Scully and Fox Mulder.

Robbins had small roles in My Friend Dahmer, and Mozart in the Jungle, and as Dee Dee Ramone in The Get Down.

In the Kay Cannon directed Blockers, Robbins played Connor, also known as 'The Chef', the prom date of Geraldine Viswanathan who played the daughter of John Cena.

Robbins appeared in Halloween (2018), a sequel to the 1978 film of the same name. He also had roles in a film adaptation of Taipei by Tao Lin, and the Chris Morris production The Day Shall Come, filmed in the Dominican Republic with Anna Kendrick.

Robbins has also worked as a disc jockey. In his psychedelic pop band, the Pow Pow Family Band, Robbins performed as a character called "Milly", a "disgruntled housewife" with an affinity for dresses and red lipstick.

== Filmography ==
=== Film ===
Year	Title	Role	Notes
1995	Dead Man Walking	Boy in church	
2009	Possible Side Effects	Chip Hunt	TV movie
2009	The Greatest	Sean Brewer	
2017	My Friend Dahmer	Lloyd Figg	
2018	Blockers	Connor Aldrich/The Chef	
2018	Halloween	Dave	
2018	High Resolution	Calvin	
2019	Daniel Isn't Real	Luke Nightingale	
2019	The Day Shall Come	Josh	
2019	Let It Snow	Billy	
2020	Fearless	Reid	Voice
2023	Old Dads	Aspen Bell	
2024	Y2K	Nugz	
2025	Control Freak	Robbie	

=== Television ===
Year	Title	Role	Notes
2016–2017	Webseries	Miles	4 episodes
2016–2018	Mozart in the Jungle	Danny/Eraseface	4 episodes
2017	The Get Down	Dee Dee Ramone	1 episode
2018	The X-Files	Jackson Van De Kamp/William	3 episodes
2020	Miracle Workers	Tristan	Dark Ages, 1 episode
2025	Crutch	Aiden	1 episode

=== Video games ===
Year	Title	Role	Notes
2022	The Quarry	Dylan Lenivy	Voice, performance capture, and likeness
