= Crazy, Stupid, Love =

2011 film by Glenn Ficarra and John Requa

Crazy, Stupid, Love.
- Theatrical release poster
- Directed by: Glenn Ficarra; John Requa
- Written by: Dan Fogelman
- Produced by: Steve Carell; Denise Di Novi
- Starring: Steve Carell; Ryan Gosling; Julianne Moore; Emma Stone; John Carroll Lynch; Marisa Tomei; Kevin Bacon
- Cinematography: Andrew Dunn
- Edited by: Lee Haxall
- Music by: Christophe Beck; Nick Urata
- Production companies: Carousel Productions; Di Novi Pictures
- Distributed by: Warner Bros. Pictures
- Release dates: July 19, 2011 (New York City); July 29, 2011 (United States)
- Running time: 118 minutes
- Country: United States
- Language: English
- Budget: $50 million
- Box office: $145 million

Crazy, Stupid, Love. is a 2011 American romantic comedy film directed by Glenn Ficarra and John Requa and written by Dan Fogelman. It stars Steve Carell, Ryan Gosling, Julianne Moore, Emma Stone, John Carroll Lynch, Marisa Tomei, and Kevin Bacon. It follows a series of interconnected love stories centered on a recently separated man, played by Carrell, who learns how to be more romantic and charm women.

The film was theatrically released in the United States on July 29, 2011, by Warner Bros. Pictures. It received positive reviews from critics and was a box office success, grossing over $145 million worldwide against a $50 million budget. It was nominated for Best Comedy at the 17th Critics' Choice Awards, while Gosling was nominated for Best Actor in a Motion Picture – Musical or Comedy at the 69th Golden Globe Awards.

== Plot ==
Cal Weaver is a middle-aged family man whose wife Emily asks for a divorce after she reveals an affair she had with co-worker David Lindhagen. The news stuns Cal, who jumps out of their moving car when Emily tries to talk about the affair. The divorce also ends his friendship with best friend Bernie Riley, whose wife sides with Emily over Cal.

After moving into his own apartment, Cal begins frequenting an upscale bar, where he talks loudly about his wife cheating and divorce. He meets Jacob Palmer, a young man and womanizer who frequently beds different women but was recently rejected by a law school graduate, Hannah. Jacob takes pity on Cal and offers to teach him how to pick up women. After a few awkward attempts to talk to women, Cal seduces a woman named Kate at the bar. This experience gives him the confidence to seduce other women, and he begins to emulate Jacob's example successfully.

Robbie makes numerous grand gestures to win the heart of his babysitter Jessica, who is Bernie's daughter. She eventually dissuades him after revealing she likes someone older, without revealing it is Cal. Eventually, Cal and Emily reunite at their 13-year-old son Robbie's parent–teacher conference, where she is impressed by his newfound confidence and fitted clothes. Their reunion goes well until they meet Robbie's teacher, who turns out to be Kate, and who spitefully reveals her and Cal's tryst because he never called her afterwards. In the ensuing argument, Cal inadvertently confesses to having sex with nine women since their separation, so Emily leaves in disgust that Cal did this as payback for her cheating while also openly dating David.

Meanwhile, Hannah is offended by her boyfriend when he offers her a position at his firm instead of proposing as expected. She returns to the bar, finds Jacob, and throws herself at him. As Jacob ends up walking her through his process of seducing women, they end up developing genuine chemistry and start dating. Emily goes on a date with David, upon returning Jessica confronts her for not appreciating cal. On the advice of a promiscuous classmate, she takes nude photos of herself, intending to give them to him. Emily calls Cal under the guise of needing help with the pilot light on her water heater, who has snuck into the backyard to check on the house. Realizing that she called just because she missed him, Cal decides to win her back.

Jacob returns Cal's calls, asking for advice about being in a real relationship and meeting his girlfriend's parents. Jessica's mother finds the naked photos, which make her and Bernie believe that Cal and Jessica are in an illicit relationship. He furiously drives to Cal's, with Jessica following to stop him.

Cal and his kids create a makeshift mini golf set in their backyard to remind Emily of their first date. During the gathering, Jacob and Hannah show up, and Hannah is revealed to be Cal and Emily's daughter. Cal is appalled that Jacob is dating his daughter, and forbids her from seeing him. Emily supports their relationship. Bernie and Jessica then arrive, revealing to everyone Jessica's and Robbie's respective feelings. David also arrives on the scene to return Emily's sweater from a previous date. Cal, Jacob, David, and Bernie then get into a scuffle which is soon broken up by the police.

With Cal now worse off with his family than ever before, Jacob warms up to them as his and Hannah's romance blossoms. Jacob finds Cal at the bar and confesses that he is in love with Hannah and has therefore re-evaluated his life. Cal is happy that he is a changed man but does not approve of their relationship, having seen his former lifestyle. Jacob does not harbor any ill feelings and praises Cal for being a great father.

At Robbie's eighth grade graduation, salutatorian Robbie gives a pessimistic speech about how he no longer believes in true love. Cal stops him, and recounts his own courtship with Emily to the audience, saying that, while he does not know if things will work out, he will never give up on her. With renewed faith, Robbie reaffirms his love for Jessica, to the audience's applause.

After the ceremony, Cal gives Jacob and Hannah his blessing. Jessica gives Robbie an envelope containing her nude photos for emotional support. Robbie then smiles optimistically as he watches Cal and Emily talking together.

== Cast ==
- Steve Carell as Cal Weaver
- Ryan Gosling as Jacob Palmer
- Julianne Moore as Emily Weaver
- Emma Stone as Hannah Weaver
- Marisa Tomei as Kate Tafferty
- Kevin Bacon as David Lindhagen
- Jonah Bobo as Robbie Weaver
- John Carroll Lynch as Bernie Riley
- Lio Tipton (Note: Credited as Analeigh Tipton. Name changed to Lio Tipton in 2021.) as Jessica Riley
- Josh Groban as Richard
- Karolina Wydra as Jordyn
- Liza Lapira as Liz
- Joey King as Molly Weaver
- Beth Littleford as Claire Riley
- Julianna Guill as Madison
- Crystal Reed as Amy Johnson
- Dan Butler as Cal's boss
- Mekia Cox as Tiffany
- Reggie Lee as Officer Huang
- Laurel Coppock as Sophia

== Production ==
The film was developed under the working title Untitled Marital Crisis Comedy.

Dan Fogelman started writing the screenplay in 2009 about love among a group of people. It is based on his own experiences and was written with Steve Carell in mind. After Fogelman sent it to his manager, within a week Carell read it and came aboard the project. In December 2009, Warner Bros. secured the rights of the then-untitled project for $2.5 million. In January 2010, the film was in pre-production. On March 16, 2010, Emma Stone was in negotiations to star in the film. On April 7, 2010, Lio Tipton was in final talks to appear in the film. On April 12, Kevin Bacon also joined the cast. It is the first project produced by Carell's Carousel Productions.

Principal photography took place in and around Los Angeles, California. Filming started on April 16, 2010, and lasted for 53 days. Locations included Westfield Century City mall, Ventura Boulevard, Hollywood Hills where Jacob's house is located, Taft High School in Woodland Hills, Portola Middle School in Tarzana and Grant High School in Van Nuys, which stood for Robbie and Jessica's campuses, El Torito Grill at the Sherman Oaks Galleria and Equinox Fitness in Woodland Hills, which became the sports club featured in the film. Before editing, the original cut was three hours long.

== Release ==
The film's release was originally slated for April 22, 2011, but was later changed to July 29, 2011.

=== Home media ===
It was released on DVD and Blu-ray on November 1, 2011. DVD sales grossed $19.8 million and Blu-ray sales $5.6 million.

== Reception ==
=== Box office ===
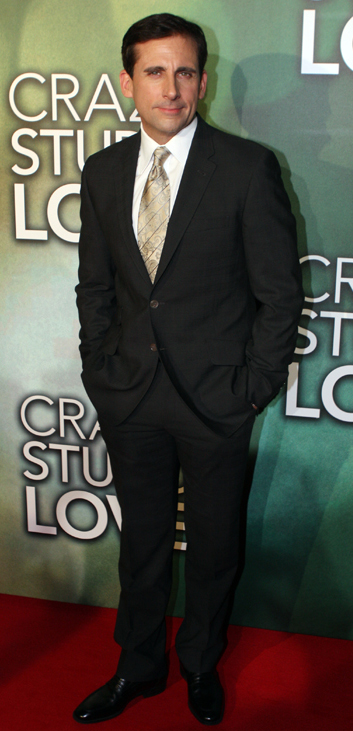
Carell at the Sydney premiere for the film in September 2011

Crazy, Stupid, Love grossed $84.3 million in the United States and Canada, and $60.7 million in other territories, for a worldwide total of $145 million.

The film opened at No. 5 at the North American box office on its opening weekend with $19.1 million.

=== Critical response ===
On the review aggregator website Rotten Tomatoes, 80% of 236 critics' reviews are positive. The website's consensus reads: "It never lives up to the first part of its title, but Crazy, Stupid, Love's unabashed sweetness – and its terrifically talented cast – more than make up for its flaws." Metacritic, which uses a weighted average, assigned the film a score of 68 out of 100, based on 40 critics, indicating "generally favorable" reviews. Audiences polled by CinemaScore gave the film an average grade of "B+" on an A+ to F scale.

Owen Gleiberman of Entertainment Weekly called it "Nothing more (or less) than an enchanting light comedy of romantic confusion... It's a movie that understands love because it understands pain." He gave it a grade "A". Roger Ebert gave Crazy, Stupid, Love 3 out of 4 stars and remarked that it "is a sweet romantic comedy about good-hearted people". A. O. Scott of The New York Times gave the film 4 out of 5 stars, and wrote: "Crazy, Stupid, Love is, on balance, remarkably sane and reasonably smart". Betsy Sharkey of the Los Angeles Times gave the film a 4 out of 5 review as well and said that it "conjures up the bittersweet magic of first loves, lasting loves, lost loves and all the loves in between".

Some reviewers were less favorable, such as Christy Lemire at the Associated Press, who wrote that "it never gets crazy or stupid enough to make you truly fall in love with it", giving the film a 2 out of 4 rating. James Rocchi of MSN Movies was particularly critical, giving it 1 out of 5 and remarking that it is "a star-studded lump of fantasy and falsehood".

Several critics included the film on their end-of-year lists. Owen Gleiberman of Entertainment Weekly included the film in 8th place on his list. TV Guide put it in 9th place on its "Best Movies of 2011" list. Peter Hartlaub of the San Francisco Chronicle included it in 10th place on his Top 20 list.

In 2025, it was one of the films voted for the "Readers' Choice" edition of The New York Times' list of "The 100 Best Movies of the 21st Century," finishing at number 288.

=== Accolades ===
List of awards and nominations
Award	Category	Recipients	Result	Ref.
BMI Film & TV Awards	Film Music Award	Nick Urata	Nominated	
Casting Society of America	Outstanding Achievement in Casting for a Big Budget Comedy Feature	Mindy Marin, Kara Lipson	Won	
Critics' Choice Movie Awards	Best Comedy		Nominated	
Detroit Film Critics Society	Best Supporting Actor	Ryan Gosling	Nominated	
Detroit Film Critics Society	Best Ensemble		Nominated	
Empire Awards	Best Comedy		Nominated	
Golden Globe Awards	Best Actor – Motion Picture Musical or Comedy	Ryan Gosling	Nominated	—N/a
Golden Trailer Awards	Best Romance TV Spot	"In It"	Nominated	
Golden Trailer Awards	Best Wildposts	"Banners"	Nominated	
MTV Movie Awards	Best Performance – Female	Emma Stone	Nominated	
MTV Movie Awards	Best Kiss	Emma Stone and Ryan Gosling	Nominated	
People's Choice Awards	Favorite Comedy Movie		Nominated	
People's Choice Awards	Favorite Actress	Emma Stone (also for The Help)	Won	
People's Choice Awards	Favorite Comedic Actor	Steve Carell	Nominated	
People's Choice Awards	Favorite Comedic Actress	Emma Stone	Won	
Teen Choice Awards	Choice Movie: Comedy		Nominated	
Teen Choice Awards	Choice Movie Actor: Comedy	Ryan Gosling	Nominated	
Teen Choice Awards	Choice Movie Actress: Comedy	Emma Stone	Won	
Teen Choice Awards	Choice Movie: Chemistry	Ryan Gosling and Steve Carell	Nominated	
Teen Choice Awards	Choice Movie: Liplock	Ryan Gosling and Emma Stone	Nominated	
Teen Choice Awards	Choice Movie: Hissy Fit	Steve Carell	Nominated	
Young Artist Awards	Best Performance in a Feature Film – Supporting Young Actor	Jonah Bobo	Nominated	
