= School of Life =

2005 made-for-television drama film by William Dear

- School of Life DVD cover
- Written by: Jonathan Kahn
- Directed by: William Dear
- Starring: Ryan Reynolds; David Paymer; John Astin; Andrew Robb; Kate Vernon
- Theme music composer: Ari Wise
- Countries of origin: Canada; United States
- Original language: English

Production
- Producer: Rosanne Milliken
- Cinematography: Brian Pearson
- Editor: Edgar Burcksen
- Running time: 111 minutes

Original release
- Network: ABC Family
- Release: February 19, 2005

School of Life is a 2005 made-for-television comedy-drama film starring Ryan Reynolds about a teacher who moves to a town and shakes the old school ways up a bit. The film premiered on ABC Family on February 19, 2005.

== Plot ==
At Fallbrook Central School, the annual student-elected Teacher of the Year award ceremony is held. Every year for the last 43 years, Norman Warner, fondly called Stormin' Norman, has won the award. During the ceremony, he collapses and dies, saying "Take your shot" and "It takes less than death to kill a man", greatly confusing his son, Matt Warner. The burden of carrying the legacy falls to Matt, who has always lived in the shadow of his father.

Determined to keep the family tradition of being Teacher of the Year alive, Matt focuses all his attention and efforts in winning the coveted title. But the new history teacher, Michael D'Angelo becomes the new student favorite, telling Matt's son to "Fall with a thunk for a woman" when he accidentally trips while watching Chase Witherspoon. He is called, even by fellow and senior teachers, "Mr. D". Young and funny, with unconventional methods of teaching and an uncanny ability to connect with his students, Mr. D. quickly wins the hearts not only of the students but also the teachers, especially the young art teacher, Ms. Davies. Now that Mr. D. is the most popular teacher on campus, Matt feels that he has no chances of winning against Mr. D.

Now obsessed with discrediting Mr. D, Matt soon forgets what it means to be a teacher. Desperate to find a flaw in "Mr Perfect", Matt follows Mr. D around town and discovers a secret the alarmingly perfect teacher is hiding: Mr. D has been diagnosed with inoperable lung cancer and does not have long to live. Shocked by the startling discovery into realizing his own pettiness, Matt slowly changes his ways of teaching and in the process wins the hearts of his students. When Mr. D stops coming to teach because of his worsening illness, the students become depressed by the situation. Matt steps in to cheer up the student's spirits and leads the basketball team to a victory, with a special guest appearance with 30 seconds left in the game by Mr. D. Chase Witherspoon, being a cheerleader, accidentally falls, and Matt's son retells her of Mr. D's quote "Fall with a thunk", and the two share a kiss, though it was quickly interrupted by the referee.

The film concludes after three years have passed and Matt's own son is now in high school, and Matt is teaching a brand new year of pupils in his life science class. He has won the Teacher of the Year for the last two years, teaching similarly to Mr. D, who won the award in the school year of 2003. The art teacher, Ms. Davies, inherited Mr. D's car and even put a Hawaiian girl on the car. The film ends with a close-up of a photo in Matt's classroom of himself, Mr. D, and the basketball team with "Michael D'Angelo 1967–2003" inscribed on the bottom of the frame.

== Cast ==
Actor	Role
Ryan Reynolds	Michael D'Angelo or Mr. D
Andrew Robb	Dylan Warner
David Paymer	Matt Warner
John Astin	Stormin' Norman Warner
Kate Vernon	Ellie Warner
Leila Johnson	Denise Davies
Chris Gauthier	Coach Vern Cote
Alexander Pollock	Clyde
Don McKay	Principal Bass
Shylo Sharity	Chase Witherspoon
Gordie Giroux	Seth
Keith Miller	Howard
Matt Fahlman	Point Guard

== Production ==
Of School of Life, Reynolds has stated one of the reasons he did the film because he wanted "to explore what education could be".

== Release ==
School of Life premiered on ABC Family on February 19, 2005.

== Reception ==
Critical reception of the film was mixed. A reviewer for The News Journal stated that "At best, this is terrific. At its worst, it's still OK." Kurt Indvik of Home Media Retailing called it "a solidly entertaining family film about kids and adults learning to appreciate their time on Earth and each other". Andrea Beach of Common Sense Media spoke positively about Reynolds' acting while criticizing aspects of the plot for being "forced", calling it "overall enjoyable, if not nearly as life-changing as it wants to be."

David Nusair of Reel Film Reviews panned the film, giving it one out of five stars and calling it a "thoroughly inept, hopelessly cliched drama." Virginia Heffernan of the Sun-Sentinel also gave the film a mixed to negative review. Heffernan called the film "weird" saying "The only explanation for this farrago is that something ... got lost in a rewrite."
