= Cats & Dogs =

2001 film directed by Lawrence Guterman

- Theatrical release poster
- Directed by: Lawrence Guterman
- Written by: John Requa; Glenn Ficarra
- Produced by: Christopher DeFaria; Andrew Lazar; Craig Perry; Warren Zide
- Starring: Jeff Goldblum; Elizabeth Perkins; Alexander Pollock
- Cinematography: Julio Macat
- Edited by: Rick W. Finney; Michael A. Stevenson
- Music by: John Debney
- Production companies: Village Roadshow Pictures; Chris Bender; Cat Fight Pictures; NPV Entertainment; Mad Chance; Zide/Perry Productions
- Distributed by: Warner Bros. Pictures
- Release date: July 4, 2001
- Running time: 87 minutes
- Country: United States
- Language: English
- Budget: $60 million
- Box office: $200.7 million

Cats & Dogs is a 2001 American spy comedy film directed by Lawrence Guterman (in his feature directorial debut) and written by John Requa and Glenn Ficarra. It stars Jeff Goldblum, Elizabeth Perkins and Alexander Pollock, with the voices of Tobey Maguire, Alec Baldwin, Sean Hayes, Susan Sarandon, Charlton Heston, Jon Lovitz, Joe Pantoliano and Michael Clarke Duncan.

The story centers on the relationships between cats and dogs, depicting the relationship as an intense rivalry in which both sides use organizations and tactics that mirror those used in human espionage. It was released by Warner Bros. Pictures on July 4, 2001. The film received mixed reviews and earned $200.7 million on a $60 million budget.

== Plot ==
Unbeknownst to humans, cats and dogs are, in reality, highly intelligent and tech-savvy enemies waging war on each other with covert operations. The Brody family find their pet Bloodhound Buddy has gone missing, yet unbeknownst to them Buddy was an agent tasked with ensuring Dr. Charles Brody completes his research into finding a cure for the allergy to dogs, and was in fact captured by enemy cats. When fellow agent, Anatolian Shepherd Butch, reports Buddy's capture to his superiors, canine agents are dispatched to help ensure Dr. Brody completes his research.

One month later, Brody's wife Carolyn goes to adopt one of a litter of Beagle puppies. A Doberman Pinscher agent replaces the litter with a pack of Miniature Pinscher agents, failing to notice the youngest Beagle left behind. Carolyn adopts the Beagle puppy and names him Lou after her son, Scotty, sarcastically suggests the name 'Loser'. Scotty is immediately dismissive of Lou as he still believes Buddy might come back, when in fact he has escaped capture and retired to Boca Raton. After saving Lou from an explosive trap laid by cats, Butch – mistaking him for a trained operative – brings him to the dogs' underground network, and introduces agents Peek, a Chinese Crested Dog, and Sam, an Old English Sheepdog. Butch realizes Lou is not the agent he was expecting, but his superiors order him to train Lou himself due to lack of time to find a replacement.

The leader of the cats, Persian cat Mr. Tinkles, plans to exploit Dr. Brody's research as part of a plan to conquer the world. Tinkles orders his sidekick Calico, an Exotic Shorthair, to send Devon Rex ninjas to steal the research. Lou foils the theft and meets a former agent and Butch's ex-girlfriend Ivy, a Saluki, who encourages him to bond with Scotty. When Dr. Brody believes he is on course to a breakthrough, Mr. Tinkles contracts a Russian Blue mercenary named Dimitri Kennelkoff to destroy the research. Kennelkoff battles Lou and Butch, damaging the Brodys' house and attempts to blow up Dr. Brody's laboratory, but Butch disables the bomb and captures Kennelkoff.

Lou makes an attempt to bond with Scotty, who is reluctant but eventually plays with Lou, but in doing so they accidentally wreck his father's lab and ruin all his research. However, doing so inadvertently results in the creation of the formula which cures human allergies to dogs. Learning of this, Mr. Tinkles sets a trap for the Brodys by luring them out with fake tickets to a soccer game. The dogs subsequently receive a video from Mr. Tinkles demanding the research as a ransom for the family. When an assembly of dogs decide not to surrender the research, Lou angrily disobeys them and Butch and agrees to exchange the formula with Mr. Tinkles for the Brodys; however, the cats double-cross him.

The rest of the dogs track down Mr. Tinkles to his owner's Christmas tree flocking plant, where they learn that he has reversed the formula to give people an allergy to dogs, and plans to use mice to spread the mass-produced allergy all over the world. While Butch, Ivy, Peek, and Sam fight Tinkles' cat forces, Lou frees the Brodys and Calico, who was betrayed by Tinkles, revealing to the family that he can speak. Lou defeats Tinkles but is struck in an explosion which destroys the whole factory; Butch rescues Lou and tearfully admits that Lou was right to love his adoptive family. Lou is joyfully reunited with Scotty and the Brodys and decides to live normal dog's life with the Brodys until he can serve as a full-grown agent. Meanwhile, Mr. Tinkles is sent to live with his owner's maid Sophie and her three sisters, who dress him in increasingly humiliating outfits as retribution.

== Cast ==
- Jeff Goldblum as Charles Brody (credited as "Professor Brody"): a professor, Carolyn's husband, and Scotty's father.
- Elizabeth Perkins as Carolyn Brody (credited as "Mrs. Brody"): Charles's wife, and Scotty's mother.
- Alexander Pollock as Scott "Scotty" Brody: Charles and Carolyn's son.
- Miriam Margolyes as Sophie: a maid
- Myron Natwick as Mr. Mason

=== Voice cast ===
- Tobey Maguire as Louis "Lou" Brody: a Beagle, who lives with the Brody family.
- Alec Baldwin as Butch: an Anatolian Shepherd, an experienced field agent, and Lou's mentor.
- Sean Hayes as Mr. Tinkles: a Persian cat, he is the leader of the cat agents, who seeks to defeat all dogs and rule the world.
- Susan Sarandon as Ivy: a Saluki, "domestically challenged" former-dog agent who has a history with Butch. Lou meets Ivy when he trains to be an agent.
- Joe Pantoliano as Peek, a Chinese Crested Dog agent.
- Michael Clarke Duncan as Sam, an Old English Sheepdog agent.
- Jon Lovitz as Calico: an Exotic Shorthair cat, and Mr. Tinkles' second-in-command.
- Charlton Heston as The Mastiff: an English Mastiff, and the leader of the dog agents.
- Billy West & Danny Mann as Ninja Cats
- Glenn Ficarra as Dimitri Kennelkoff / The Russian: a Russian Blue cat agent, who is sent to detonate an explosive at Professor Brody's lab.
- Paul Pape as Wolf Blitzer, a wolf and news reporter for Canine News Network. He is a parody of the CNN news reporter of the same name.
- Victor Wilson as Doberman Drill Sergeant
- Charles Howerton as the German Shepherd at Dog Headquarters
- Richard Steven Horvitz as the Puppy at Barn
- Salome Jens as the Collie at HQ

=== Puppeteers ===
- Adam Behr
- Kevin Carlson
- Alejandro Diaz
- Randi Kaplan
- John Kennedy
- Luke Khanlian
- Bruce Lanoil
- Drew Massey
- Frank Meschkuleit (uncredited)
- Gordon Robertson
- Michelan Sisti
- Allan Trautman

== Production ==
In September 1998, it was reported that Warner Bros. Pictures had acquired a pitch from The Angry Beavers writers John Requa and Glenn Ficarra called Cats and Dogs that follows the spy based shenanigans of cats and dogs when humans aren't looking for a six figure sum. Lawrence Guterman came aboard to direct the film after a live-action/animated Curious George he'd been working on for Industrial Light & Magic stalled in development. Following the success of Columbia Pictures' adaptation of Stuart Little, Warner Bros. became more bullish on the project by January 2000 and even discussed having two first units work on the film to fast track it for a holiday 2000 release before opting for sometime in 2001 instead. Warner Bros.' spotty track record when it came to releasing animated films such as the critically acclaimed but underperforming The Iron Giant and the eleventh hour cancellation of a remake of The Incredible Mr. Limpet starring Jim Carrey and directed by Steve Oedekerk were cited as factors in Warner Bros. hesitance in formally greenlighting the film.

The film was shot in Vancouver, British Columbia and Eagle Creek Studios in Burnaby, British Columbia, Canada from June 19 to November 17, 2000. Lou's doghouse was filmed on Stage 1, Mr. Mason's office and the interior of the tree flocking factory was filmed on Stage 2, and the international meeting with the dogs was filmed on Stage 3, while the backyard of the Brody house was filmed on the studio backlot, and the front exterior of the Brody house was filmed at 1661 W 45th Avenue in Vancouver. The film features visual effects by Rhythm & Hues Studios, known for films such as Stuart Little, Mouse Hunt, and Hocus Pocus.

== Release ==
Cats & Dogs was released with the classic Looney Tunes short "Chow Hound" which was also seen in the film itself. When released on Independence Day 2001, the film opened at #1, beating out Scary Movie 2 as it grossed $21.7 million over the Friday to Sunday span, averaging $7,140 from 3,040 theaters. It grossed $35.8 million over the Wednesday to Sunday span. It dropped 44% the following weekend, dropping to the #3 spot, grossing $12 million, falling behind Legally Blonde and The Score, and bringing its 12-day gross to $58.9 million. Cats & Dogs opened in the UK with $5.3 million during its first weekend, ranking in first place ahead of Rush Hour 2, while also having the third-highest opening weekend for a Warner Bros. film, behind Batman Forever and Batman & Robin. The film grossed $93.4 million in the US and $107.3 million overseas, for a total of $200.7 million worldwide on a $60 million budget.

Cats & Dogs was released on VHS and DVD on October 23, 2001. An alternate ending that shows Sophie instead taking Mr. Tinkles to a pet hospital to be neutered was also included as one of the extras. It was later released on Blu-ray on July 20, 2010, 10 days before the release of its sequel, The Revenge of Kitty Galore.

The soundtrack by composer John Debney was released in 2001. It includes What's New Pussycat? by Tom Jones.

== Reception ==
On Rotten Tomatoes, the film holds an approval rating of 52% based on 117 reviews, with an average rating of 5.5/10. The site's critical consensus reads: "A great concept, but the movie fails to develop the characters and some of the jokes are hit-or-miss." On Metacritic the film has a weighted average score of 47 out of 100 based on 26 critics, indicating "mixed or average" reviews. Audiences polled by CinemaScore gave the film an average grade of "B+" on an A+ to F scale.

The Washington Post's Jane Horwitz called it "[a] surprisingly witty and sophisticated spy movie spoof that will tickle adult pet lovers and still capture kids 6 and older with its boy-and-his-dog love story and pet slapstick". Roger Ebert gave the film 3 stars out of 4, praising the special effects and the CGI. In contrast, Kenneth Turan of the Los Angeles Times wrote: "Irritating, childish and more frantic than funny, Cats & Dogs does manage some few pleasant moments, but they are not worth waiting for".

Cats & Dogs was nominated for the Young Artist Award for Best Feature Film (Comedy) and Best Performance in a Feature Film - Leading Young Actor (Alexander Pollock). John Debney won the ASCAP Award for his musical contribution to this film as well as The Princess Diaries and Spy Kids.

Heston received the 2001 Razzie Award for Worst Supporting Actor for his role as The Mastiff in this film, Mr. Claybourne in Town & Country, as well as for his cameo role in Tim Burton's remake of Planet of the Apes.

== Sequels ==
=== Cats & Dogs: The Revenge of Kitty Galore (2010) ===
A sequel titled Cats & Dogs: The Revenge of Kitty Galore, directed by Brad Peyton, was released on July 30, 2010. Michael Clarke Duncan, Joe Pantoliano, and Sean Hayes reprised their roles as Sam, Peek, and Mr. Tinkles while Nick Nolte and Wallace Shawn replaced Alec Baldwin and Jon Lovitz as Butch and Calico. In this film, Lou is now an adult and is voiced by Neil Patrick Harris. James Marsden, Christina Applegate, and Bette Midler voice new characters named Diggs, Catherine, and Kitty Galore respectively.

=== Cats & Dogs 3: Paws Unite! (2020) ===
A third installment and stand-alone sequel, subtitled Paws Unite!, features a new storyline taking place 10 years after the events of the previous film. However, unlike the previous two, the third film has been released as a straight-to-video release on digital on September 15, 2020, and on DVD and Blu-ray on October 13. It is also the only film to not have any of the original cast members. The new voice cast includes Melissa Rauch, Max Greenfield and George Lopez. It was directed by Sean McNamara, co-produced by Andrew Lazar and David Fliegel, and written by Scott Bindley. It is distributed by Warner Bros. Home Entertainment. The film received a nationwide theatrical release in Australia on September 24, and in the UK on October 2.
