= Control Freak (film) =

- Release poster
- Directed by: Shal Ngo
- Written by: Shal Ngo
- Produced by: David Brooks; Jenna Cavelle; Arbi Pedrossian; Shaum S. Sengupta
- Starring: Kelly Marie Tran; Miles Robbins; Kieu Chinh; Scott Takeda
- Cinematography: Scott Siracusano
- Edited by: Dagmawi Abebe
- Music by: Landon Knoblock; Jay Wadley
- Production company: WorthenBrooks
- Distributed by: Hulu
- Release date: March 13, 2025
- Running time: 104 minutes
- Country: United States
- Language: English

Control Freak is a 2025 American body horror film written and directed by Shal Ngo. It stars Kelly Marie Tran, Miles Robbins, Kieu Chinh, and Scott Takeda.

The film was released on Hulu on March 13, 2025. It received positive reviews.

== Plot ==
Valerie "Val" Nguyen is a successful motivational speaker who secretly struggles with a compulsive urge to scratch the back of her head. This behavior intensifies following the death of her mother, Chi, which occurred during a traumatic boating accident in Val's childhood.

As Val prepares for an international tour, she discovers she needs her birth certificate, prompting her to reconnect with her estranged family. Her Aunt Thuy directs her to her father, Sang, a former soldier turned monk, who possesses the necessary documents. Val's relationship with Sang is strained due to past traumas, including her mother's death and Sang's history of addiction.

During her visit, Sang tells her a Vietnamese folk tale about the Sanshi, a parasitic ghost that feeds on human hosts, driving them to destructive compulsions. Val dismisses the story until she uncovers old photographs of her mother with mysterious rashes, suggesting a familial curse.

As Val's compulsion worsens, she scratches an open wound into her scalp. Her husband, Robbie, discovers that she has secretly been taking birth control pills despite their plans to conceive, which causes a rift between them. Val confronts Sang, who admits to summoning the Sanshi during the Vietnam War, inadvertently passing it to Chi. He reveals that Chi attempted to drown Val as a child to prevent the Sanshi's spread, forcing Sang to kill Chi to save their daughter.

Val's condition deteriorates, culminating in a breakdown during a speaking engagement. Hospitalized, doctors discover she has scratched a hole into her skull, leading to hallucinations. Robbie brings her home to recover, but Val remains convinced of the Sanshi's presence.

In a climactic confrontation, Val attempts to exorcise the Sanshi by inflicting harm upon herself, believing it will draw out the entity. She battles a monstrous manifestation of the Sanshi and ultimately drags it into a swimming pool, attempting to drown it, as Sang once tried. Robbie rescues Val, and she emerges holding a diminished, fetal-like version of the Sanshi, symbolizing her confrontation with her inner demons.

The film concludes with Val revealing her pregnancy to Robbie. However, a subtle hint — a bug crawling on her baby — suggests that the Sanshi's influence may still persist, leaving the ending ambiguous.

== Cast ==
- Kelly Marie Tran as Valerie "Val" Nguyen
- Miles Robbins as Robbie
- Kieu Chinh as Thuy
- Scott Takeda as Dr. Chen

== Production ==
In April 2024, it was reported that post-production was underway on a horror film titled Control Freak, written and directed by Shal Ngo, and starring Kelly Marie Tran, Miles Robbins, Kieu Chinh, and Scott Takeda.

== Release ==
Control Freak was released on Hulu on March 13, 2025.

== Reception ==
On the review aggregator website Rotten Tomatoes, 68% of 22 critics' reviews are positive, with an average rating of 6.0/10. Metacritic, which uses a weighted average, assigned the film a score of 62 out of 100, based on four critics, indicating "generally favorable" reviews.

Matt Zoller Seitz of Rogerebert.com gave it 3 1/2 out of 4 stars and said;

“Control Freak” is a film so raw, messy, and sincere that it seems to have been torn from the bodies of the people who made it. ... It’s a clearly personal film in which the writer-director appears to have an eerie mind meld with his lead actress that allows her to become a vessel for expressing his inchoate obsessions and anxieties (and vice-versa). (Tran is brilliant here, giving a performance that’s perfectly modulated no matter how upsetting or bizarre things get; there are a couple of scenes that made me imagine Gena Rowlands in a John Cassavetes domestic drama, though covered in gore and goo.)

However, Hannah Rose of CBR gave the film a rating of 6 over 10 and she said;

"It has some good practical effects and provides a fresh take on folk and psychological horror. However, for all its grand ideas and sincerity, Control Freak is weighed down by superfluous drama, poor pacing, and skewed priorities."
