= Focus (2015 film) =

- Theatrical release poster
- Directed by: Glenn Ficarra; John Requa
- Written by: Glenn Ficarra; John Requa
- Produced by: Denise Di Novi
- Starring: Will Smith; Margot Robbie; Rodrigo Santoro; Gerald McRaney
- Cinematography: Xavier Pérez Grobet
- Edited by: Jan Kovac
- Music by: Nick Urata
- Production companies: RatPac-Dune Entertainment; Di Novi Pictures; Zaftig Films
- Distributed by: Warner Bros. Pictures
- Release dates: February 11, 2015 (London); February 27, 2015 (United States)
- Running time: 105 minutes
- Country: United States
- Language: English
- Budget: $50.1–65 million
- Box office: $168.1 million

Focus is a 2015 American crime comedy-drama film written and directed by Glenn Ficarra and John Requa. Will Smith stars as a career con artist who takes an aspiring femme fatale (Margot Robbie) under his wing.

Focus was released on February 27, 2015. It received mixed reviews from critics but was a success at the box office, grossing $168 million against its $50 million budget.

== Plot ==
Veteran con artist Nicky encounters novice grifter Jess, who tries to con him by seducing him and then threatening him with a fake jealous husband. After exposing the ruse, Nicky offers her guidance and later recruits her into his large crew. In New Orleans, Jess proves herself by successfully executing several pickpocket operations. The two begin a romantic relationship, unsettling Nicky; his estranged father, Bucky, taught him to never become emotionally involved with colleagues.

The great event the crew is gearing up for is the Super Bowl, as directly afterwards they will disband. There, Nicky takes Jess with him to a Luxury box, where they lightheartedly engage in a series of escalating bets about random things they see. Soon, wealthy gambler Liyuan Tse joins in.

Eventually Nicky loses all of the money the crew has earned. To win it back, he tells Tse to pick any player on or off the field and has Jess guess the player's jersey number. Distraught, she scans the field, sees Nicky's crew member Farhad wearing number 55, and realizes it is another con.

They take Tse for millions. Nicky later explains how Tse had been primed to pick 55 from his arrival in New Orleans, with subtle, subliminal prompts throughout his stay. Jess was kept in the dark, to take on the role of convincer. Afterward, Nicky abruptly parts ways with her, leaving her a share of the money and sending her away without explanation.

Three years later, Nicky resurfaces in Buenos Aires, hired by motorsport team owner Rafael Garriga to sabotage a rival team by selling them a faulty fuel-burning algorithm. There, he unexpectedly reunites with Jess, who is now romantically involved with Garriga. Nicky resumes pursuing her while secretly orchestrating a scheme to sell the real algorithm to multiple teams, including Garriga's top competitor, McEwen, for a large profit.

Farhad comes in to help Nicky, he meets with Jess, presenting her with a stolen necklace Nicky had held on for her, despite having insisted it was too risky. She ends up sitting with him and, although he insists he has changed, she leaves. Jess shows up at Nicky's a short time later, and they are intimate.

Owens, Nicky's partner in the scam and Garriga's head of security, shows up in the morning. Jess successfully keeps out of his sight. Nicky spends the day selling the algorithm several times over. He and Jess are eventually captured with the money by Garriga's security team.

To save Jess, Nicky claims he manipulated her to gain access to Garriga's computer. However, Jess reveals she was also running her own con, making Nicky believe she was with Garriga when she was only after his watch. As tensions escalate, Owens shoots Nicky, causing a horrified Garriga to flee and Jess to declare her love to him. It is revealed that Owens is actually Nicky's father, Bucky, and the shooting was a staged version of the "Toledo Panic Button"—a misdirection tactic.

Bucky drives Nicky and Jess to the hospital to treat Nicky's wound. After confessing he had abandoned him to protect him, he warns that love is dangerous in their line of work, then departs with all of the money. Nicky and Jess reconcile, sharing a laugh over Jess having successfully stolen Garriga's $200,000 watch. They walk toward the hospital together.

== Cast ==
- Will Smith as Nicky Spurgeon
- Margot Robbie as Jess Barrett
- Rodrigo Santoro as Rafael Garriga
- Gerald McRaney as Bucky Owens
- Adrian Martinez as Farhad
- B. D. Wong as Liyuan Tse
- Robert Taylor as McEwen
- Brennan Brown as Horst
- Griff Furst as Gareth
- Stephanie Honoré as Janice
- Dominic Fumusa as Jared Mikulski
- Juan Minujin as Marcello

== Production ==
=== Development ===
Focus was written and directed by Glenn Ficarra and John Requa. Sleight-of-hand expert Apollo Robbins was hired as a consultant to choreograph the film's pickpocketing sequences. The directing duo, along with production designer Beth Mickle, conducted an initial location scouting trip to Buenos Aires, Argentina. A subsequent trip with producers Denise Di Novi and Mark Scoon finalized filming locations in the neighborhoods of San Telmo, Puerto Madero, Barracas, Retiro, Recoleta, and Palermo, as well as Ezeiza International Airport and several hotels.

=== Casting ===
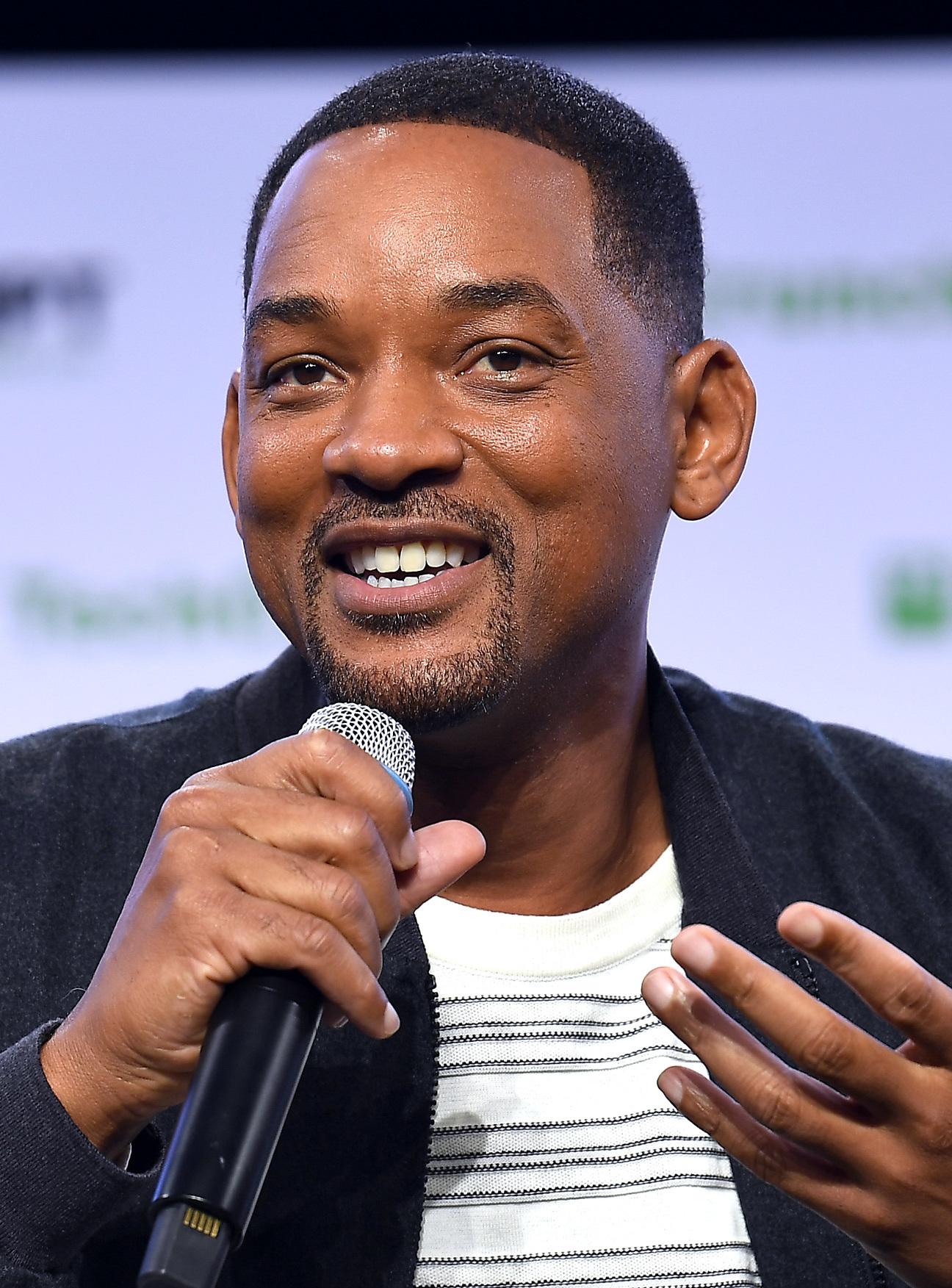
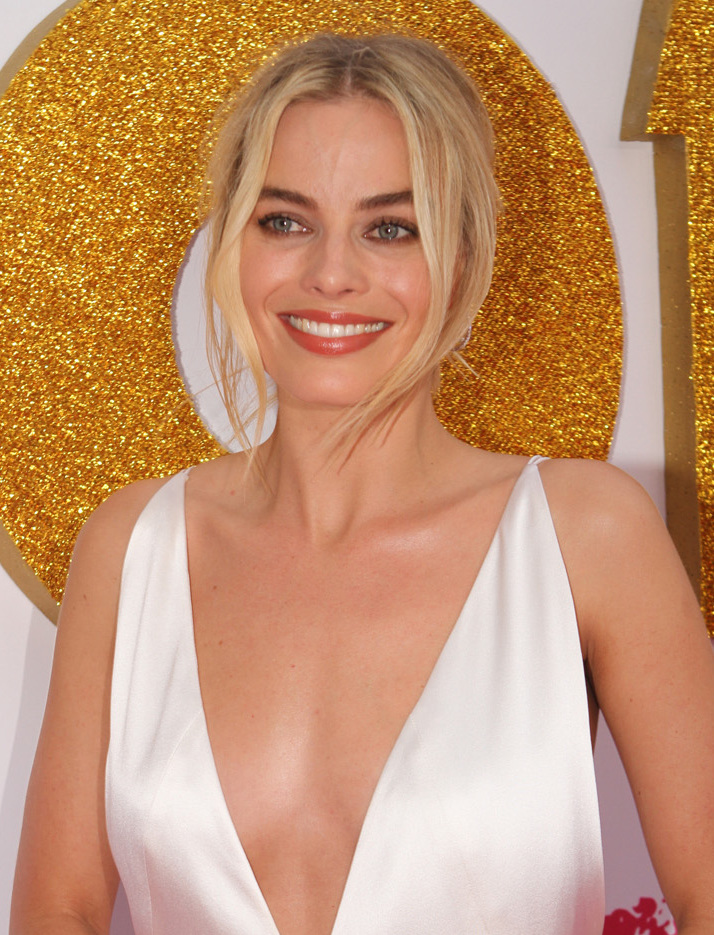
Will Smith (in 2019) and Margot Robbie (in 2018).

Will Smith and Margot Robbie were cast in the lead roles, with Smith portraying seasoned con artist Nicky and Robbie as his protégé Jess. Rodrigo Santoro, Gerald McRaney, and Adrian Martinez were cast in supporting roles.

Kristen Stewart was originally cast for the film, but left the project due to her concern with the age gap between her and Smith.

=== Filming ===
Principal photography began on September 14, 2013, in New Orleans. Production then moved to Buenos Aires on November 19, 2013, where it continued for three weeks before wrapping on December 10. The final leg of filming took place in New York City, concluding on December 17, 2013.

The film was the first major Hollywood production edited entirely on Final Cut Pro X.

== Release ==
=== Theatrical release ===
Focus was theatrically released in the United States and Germany on February 27, 2015. On January 29, 2015, Warner Bros. Pictures and IMAX Corporation announced that the film would also be released in IMAX theaters, digitally remastered using IMAX format.

=== Home media ===
The film was released on Blu-ray, DVD, and Blu-ray/DVD combo pack on June 2, 2015, by Warner Home Video.

== Reception ==
=== Box office ===
Focus grossed $53.9 million in North America and $114.2 million in other territories, for a worldwide total of $168.1 million against a production budget of $50.1 million.

In the United States and Canada, the film made $6.4 million on its opening day, $7.6 million on its second, and $4.6 million on its third, bringing its opening weekend total to $18.7 million from 3,323 theaters, with a per-theater average of $5,623. It debuted at number one at the box office. Internationally, the film was released in 39 markets during its opening weekend and grossed $12.2 million. Its top international markets included the United Kingdom ($13 million), Russia ($3.1 million), and the Netherlands ($1.8 million).

=== Critical response ===
On the review aggregator website Rotten Tomatoes, Focus holds an approval rating of 55% based on 229 reviews, with an average rating of 5.80/10. The website's critical consensus reads, "Focus may have a few too many twists and turns, but it nearly skates by on its glamorous setting and the charm of its stars." On Metacritic, the film has a weighted average score of 56 out of 100, based on 42 critics, indicating "mixed or average reviews." Audiences polled by CinemaScore gave the film a grade of "B" on an A+ to F scale.

Richard Roeper of the Chicago Sun-Times described the film as "sheer, escapist entertainment from start to finish." The Free Press Journal called the film "smart, slick, but shallow." Nick De Semlyen of Empire wrote, "This is maximum-gloss entertainment with its fair share of tricksy rug pulls. But, like one of the neon-coloured cocktails Smith drinks in it, it’s more of an immediate rush than something you’ll remember in a year."

== Soundtrack ==
The soundtrack album was released on February 24, 2015, by WaterTower Music.

1. "I'm a Manchild" – Uptown Funk Empire
2. "Sofa Rockers (Richard Dorfmeister Remix)" – Sofa Surfers
3. "Please!" – Edward Sharpe and the Magnetic Zeros
4. "Wind It Up" – Stooges Brass Band
5. "You Don't Have to Worry" – Doris & Kelley
6. "Meet Me in the City" – Junior Kimbrough
7. "Sympathy for the Devil" – The Rolling Stones
8. "Gimme Danger" – The Stooges
9. "Chorra" – Los Mareados
10. "La Espada de Cadorna" – Mauro Alberelli, Fernando Diego, Barreyro, Maria Carla Flores, Fermin Echeveste, Manuel Gonzalez Aguilar, Mateo Gonzalez Aguilar and Carlos Maximiliano Russo
11. "Gerli Hood" – Ivan Diaz Mathe, Jorge Estenbenet, Sebastian Martinez, Francisco Olivero, Daniel Michel, Juan Manuel Meyer and Gala Iglesias Brickles featuring Camilo Costaldi Lira and Alberto Manuel Rodriguez
12. "Corazon de Piedra (Te Amo)" – Alenjandro Medina
13. "White Bird" – It's a Beautiful Day
14. "Love Makes the World Go Round" – Barbara Lewis
15. "Focus (Love Theme)" – Nick Urata
16. "The Windmills of Your Mind" – Ray Conniff and The Singers
