= The Space Between Us (film) =

2017 American sci-fi film by Peter Chelsom

- Theatrical release poster
- Directed by: Peter Chelsom
- Screenplay by: Allan Loeb
- Story by: Stewart Schill; Richard Barton Lewis; Allan Loeb
- Produced by: Richard Barton Lewis
- Starring: Gary Oldman; Asa Butterfield; Carla Gugino; Britt Robertson; B. D. Wong; Janet Montgomery
- Cinematography: Barry Peterson
- Edited by: David Moritz
- Music by: Andrew Lockington
- Production companies: STXfilms; Huayi Brothers Pictures; Los Angeles Media Fund; Southpaw Entertainment; Scarlet Fire Entertainment; Virgin Produced
- Distributed by: STXfilms
- Release date: February 3, 2017
- Running time: 121 minutes
- Country: United States
- Budget: $30 million
- Box office: $16 million

The Space Between Us is a 2017 American romantic science fiction film directed by Peter Chelsom and written by Allan Loeb, from a story by Stewart Schill, Richard Barton Lewis, and Loeb. The film stars Gary Oldman, Asa Butterfield, Britt Robertson, and Carla Gugino, and follows a teenage boy, born on Mars, who travels to Earth.

Principal photography began on September 14, 2015, in Albuquerque, New Mexico. The film was released on February 3, 2017, by STXfilms. It received negative reviews from critics and was a box office bomb, grossing $16 million against its $30 million budget.

== Plot ==
Billionaire CEO Nathaniel Shepard launches the first mission to colonize Mars. During the journey, astronaut Sarah Elliot discovers she is pregnant. She gives birth to Gardner after landing on Mars, and dies afterwards from eclampsia; the father is unknown. Gardner's birth is kept secret, as Shepard fears a public relations disaster and returning to Earth could be dangerous to his health. He is raised by astronaut Kendra Wyndham and the other scientists on Mars.

Sixteen years later, Gardner hacks into a robot he helped build to gain access to his mother's personal belongings. He finds a wedding ring and a video of Sarah and a man in a beach house. Convinced that the man is his father, Gardner becomes determined to find him. Gardner regularly uses an Internet chatroom to talk to Tulsa, a street-smart girl from Colorado living in the foster-care system. He tells her he is confined to a penthouse due to osteogenesis imperfecta. They discuss their plans for the future and he promises to visit her someday.

Kendra contacts Nathaniel and Genesis director Tom Chen to request that Gardner be allowed to go to Earth. Nathaniel refuses as Gardner would need risky surgery to increase his bone density and training to adapt to Earth's atmospheric pressure. Gardner secretly undergoes the surgery and training against Nathaniel's wishes and boards a shuttle for Earth with Kendra and several other astronauts.

Gardner is quarantined while undergoing medical tests to determine his fitness for life on Earth. He escapes before seeing the tests showing he cannot survive on Earth, and finds Tulsa, convincing her to help him find his father. Nathaniel and Kendra pursue him and try to convince Gardner to return to NASA. He runs away after learning the location of the man who married his parents, Neka. Nathaniel and Kendra learn that Gardner's body contains dangerously high levels of troponin, indicative of an enlarged heart, which cannot withstand the atmospheric pressure of Earth; he must return to Mars immediately if he is to survive.

Gardner confesses his true origins to Tulsa, who does not believe him. They find Neka, who lets Tulsa use his computer to locate the beach house from Gardner's video. During their travels Gardner collapses and is taken to a hospital. When X-rays show carbon tubes in his bones, Tulsa finally believes Gardner's claims of being born on Mars. Despite his condition, Gardner wants to meet his father before he dies. Tulsa sneaks Gardner out of the hospital and they drive to the beach house, where they learn the man from the video is Gardner's uncle, not his father. A distraught Gardner runs to the sea, telling Tulsa this is where he wants to die, before collapsing. Nathaniel and Kendra arrive and rescue Gardner. Gardner asks Nathaniel about Sarah, then realizes Nathaniel is his father. They rush him to a NASA base and launch Gardner into orbit, where his condition stabilizes.

Soon after, Gardner boards a space shuttle to Mars after sharing an emotional parting with Tulsa. Kendra, who has retired from active flight status with NASA, adopts her. Determined to join Gardner on Mars, Tulsa joins Kendra's space training program. Gardner is seen back on Mars with Nathaniel.

== Cast ==
- Gary Oldman as Nathaniel Shepherd
- Asa Butterfield as Gardner Elliot
- Carla Gugino as Kendra Wyndham
- Britt Robertson as Tulsa
- B. D. Wong as Genesis Director Tom Chen
- Janet Montgomery as Sarah Elliot
- Trey Tucker as Harrison Lane
- Scott Takeda as Dr. Gary Loh
- Adande Thorne as Scott Hubbard
- Colin Egglesfield as Sarah's Brother
- Gil Birmingham as Shaman Neka
- Logan Paul as Roger
- Danny Winn as Dr. Cox

== Production ==
In 1999, Universal Pictures and Mike Lobell Productions acquired a screenplay, then titled Mainland, about a rebellious teen born on the moon who desired to come to the earth but whose physiology, it was feared, would not be able to survive the transition. After failed rewrites by Allison Burnett (Autumn in New York), the project was placed on hiatus, as Lobell left Universal for a deal at Castle Rock Entertainment. The project remained unproduced for over a decade.

On March 13, 2014, an industry source revealed that a science fiction-adventure film titled Out of This World was in development at Relativity Media, scripted by Allan Loeb. Later in August 2014, it was reported that Peter Chelsom, who had previously directed Hector and the Search for Happiness for Relativity, was hired to direct the film, while Relativity would produce and distribute. Southpaw Entertainment's Richard B. Lewis was attached to produce the film, and also received a "story by" credit.

On February 2, 2015, Asa Butterfield was tapped to play the lead character in the film, a teen who was raised on Mars, and who falls in love with a girl on Earth he has been communicating with. Chelsom and Tinker Lindsay rewrote the screenplay. On July 13, 2015, it was announced that Relativity was selling the project to STX Entertainment, in order to reach an agreement with its creditors and avoid having to file for bankruptcy. STX produced and distributed the film. On July 31, 2015, Gary Oldman, Carla Gugino, and Britt Robertson joined the cast of the then-untitled film. Robertson would play the female lead, a teen girl from Colorado. On September 8, 2015, it was announced that the title of the film would be The Space Between Us, and B. D. Wong and Janet Montgomery were added to the cast. On September 30, 2015, Trey Tucker joined the film to play an astronaut, and on October 23, 2015, Scott Takeda was cast to play a doctor in the film.

The actors Asa Butterfield (20 years old at the time of the film's release) and Britt Robertson (27 at the time) have a seven-year age gap between them, greater than their respective characters (both of whom are around 16 or 17), which caused controversy, but in an interview Robertson explains that the age difference helped with the dynamic of the relationship between Tulsa and Gardner:

I don't think Tulsa is really a teenager. She's had to be an adult for a really long time. She's had to take care of herself. She's had to figure out where she's going to live, and pay her mortgage or gas. She thinks like an adult. There's this dynamic where she's almost parenting him in some ways. There's this very specific kind of thing where she's teaching him about the world (saying), "Get it together, these are people. Why are you doing it this way? Why aren't you being human?" [Our age difference] I think really helps the dynamic. It's not something I really pay attention to.

Principal photography on the film began on September 14, 2015, in Albuquerque, New Mexico.

Decathlon diving masks were used as ordinary masks for the team that helps the returning astronauts out of the spaceship.

Andrew Lockington composed the film's score, which was released through Sony Music Entertainment.

== Release ==
In August 2015, STX Entertainment scheduled the film to be released on July 29, 2016. The release date was later switched with STX's other release, Bad Moms, and was moved its release date later to August 19, 2016. However, Kubo and the Two Strings, Ben-Hur, and War Dogs were all slated for August 19, 2016, and STX Entertainment moved its release date later to December 21, 2016, allowing more time for work on the visual effects. The film's release date was later moved to December 16, 2016, and finally STX Entertainment moved its release date later to February 3, 2017.

=== Box office ===
The Space Between Us grossed $7.9 million in the United States and Canada and $6.9 million in other territories for a worldwide total of $14.8 million, against a production budget of $30 million.

In North America, The Space Between Us was released alongside Rings and The Comedian, and was projected to gross $8–10 million from 2,812 theaters during its opening weekend. The film ended up grossing $1.4 million on its first day and $3.8 million in its opening weekend, finishing well below expectations, and 7th at the box office. In its third weekend the film grossed $260,000 after being pulled from 2,441 theaters (dropping 84.6% to 331), marking the 11th biggest theater drop in history.

=== Critical response ===
On Rotten Tomatoes, the film has an approval rating of 17% based on 136 reviews, with an average rating of 4.3/10. The site's critical consensus reads, "The Space Between Us strands its star-crossed young lovers in a mind-numbingly vast expanse of shameless cheese that will send all but the most forgiving viewers eye-rolling for the exits." On Metacritic, the film holds a score 33 out of 100, based on 32 critics, indicating "generally unfavorable reviews". Audiences polled by CinemaScore gave the film an average grade of "A−" on an A+ to F scale.

Writing for IndieWire, David Ehrlich gave the film a grade of "C", calling it a "guileless and good-natured sci-fi love story". Kevin Maher gave a scathing review in The Times, writing that the film is "notable only for some horrendously bad science and a career-low performance from Gary Oldman".

=== Accolades ===
Award	Date of ceremony	Category	Nominee	Result	Ref.
Teen Choice Awards	July 31, 2016	Choice Movie Actress: AnTEENcipated	Britt Robertson	Nominated	
Teen Choice Awards	August 13, 2017	Choice Movie: Sci-Fi	The Space Between Us	Nominated	
Teen Choice Awards	August 13, 2017	Choice Movie Actor: Sci-Fi	Asa Butterfield	Nominated	

== See also ==
- List of films set on Mars
