= Alexander Pollock =

Canadian realtor & actor

- Occupations: Actor (retired), realtor (active)
- Years active: 1996–2005

Alexander Pollock is a Canadian realtor and former actor. He is best known for his roles as Corky in Big Bully (1996), Scotty Brody in Cats & Dogs (2001), and Richie/Elf Tight End in The Santa Clause 2 (2002).

== Career ==
He made his debut in 1996 as Corky in Big Bully.

He appeared as Scotty Brody in Cats & Dogs (2001). Other notable appearances include The Santa Clause 2, the 2002 TV series Taken, and the 2005 film School of Life. School of Life was Alexander's final movie.

For his role in Cats & Dogs, he was nominated for the Young Artist Award for Best Performance in a Feature Film and Leading Young Actor.

After filming School of Life, Pollock retired from acting. Today, he is a realtor in his hometown of Vancouver, British Columbia, Canada.

== Filmography ==
Year	Title	Role	Notes
1996	Big Bully	Corky	
1996	The Angel of Pennsylvania Avenue	Jack Feagan	
1997	The Stepsister	Brian Harrison	
1997	The Outer Limits	Boy	
1997	Northern Lights	Bobby	
1997	Cloned	Timmy/Chris	
1998	Floating Away	Brat (Kyle)	
1999	You Know My Name	Woody Tighman	
1999	Resurrection	Hollis	
1999	Fatal Error	Grandson	Credited as Alex Pollock
1999	The Crow: Stairway to Heaven	Jason Vincennes	
1999	Hayley Wagner, Star	Seth	
2000	They Nest	Henry S. Crump	
2001	Replicant	Young Garrotte	
2001	Cats & Dogs	Scotty Brody	
2001	Video Voyeur: The Susan Wilson Story	Orin Wilson	
2002	American Dreams	Kid in store	
2002	The Santa Clause 2	Richie/Elf Tight End	
2002	Taken	Edward Watkins Jr.	TV miniseries
2003	A Wrinkle in Time	Eric O'Keefe	
2005	School of Life	Jesse Miller	
