= Kim Barker =

American journalist and author

- Born: 1970 (age 55–56); Billings, Montana, U.S.
- Occupation: Journalist
- Employers: Chicago Tribune; ProPublica; New York Times

Kim Barker is an American journalist who authored The Taliban Shuffle: Strange Days in Afghanistan and Pakistan about her experiences covering the War in Afghanistan. The book was adapted into the 2016 film Whiskey Tango Foxtrot, where Barker was portrayed by Tina Fey.

Barker was the South Asia bureau chief for the Chicago Tribune. She was based in New Delhi, India and Islamabad, Pakistan. She also covered the 2004 Indian Ocean earthquake and tsunami and the 2005 Kashmir earthquake. After writing the book she got a job with ProPublica covering campaign finance. In the wake of Lara Logan's account of sexual assault, Barker wrote about harassment issues she faced being a female correspondent.

She is a reporter for The New York Times. In 2023 she produced a podcast called The Coldest Case in Laramie about an investigation lacking evidence from her hometown of Laramie, Wyoming.
