= Lourdes Grobet =

Mexican photographer (1940–2022)

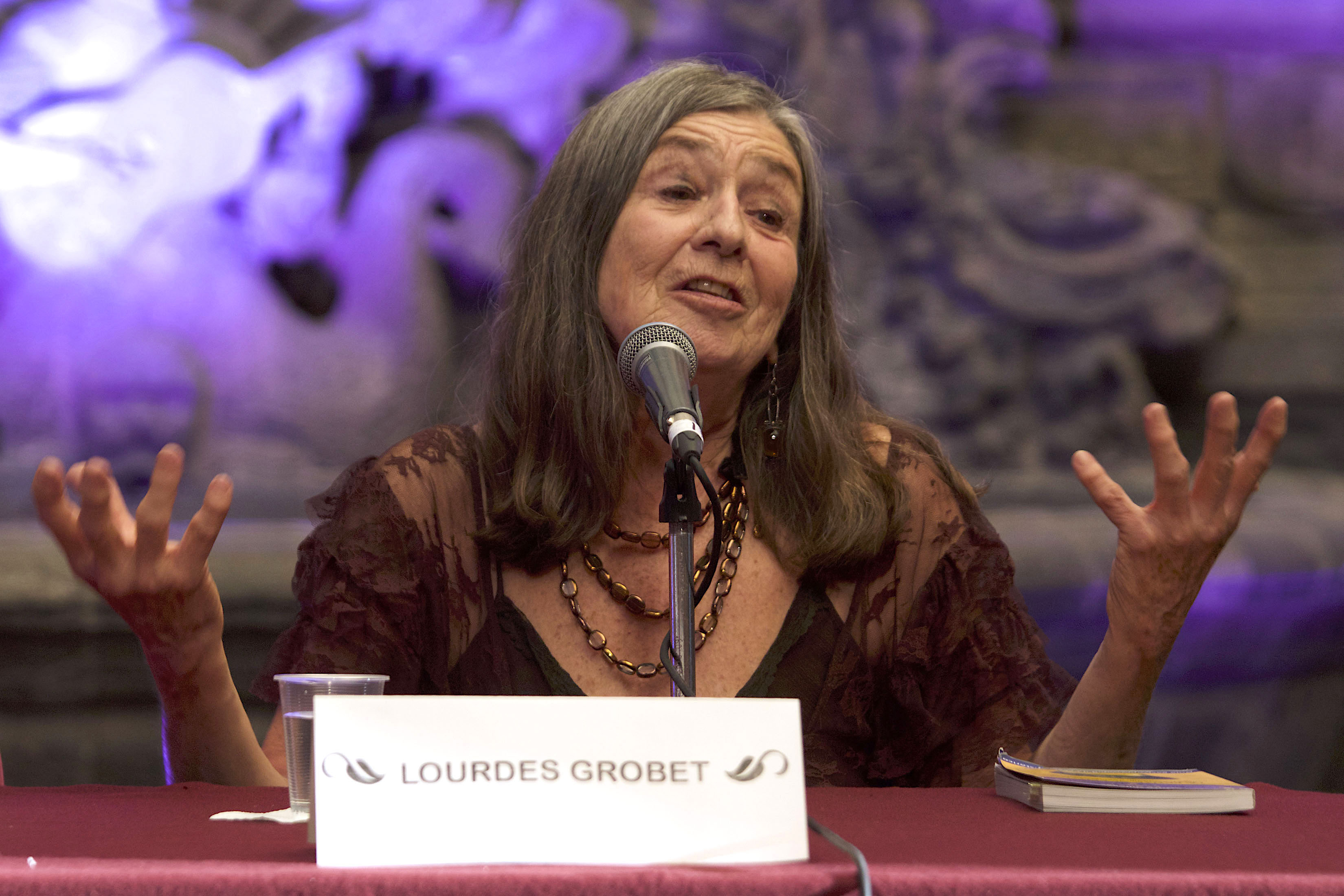
- Grobet in 2018
- Born: 25 July 1940; México City, Mexico
- Died: 15 July 2022 (aged 81); México City, Mexico
- Occupation: Photographer
- Known for: Documenting the lucha libre
- Movement: Grupos
- Children: Xavier Pérez Grobet
- Website: lourdesgrobet.com

Lourdes Grobet Argüelles (25 July 1940 – 15 July 2022) was a Mexican contemporary photographer, known for her photographs of Mexican lucha libre wrestlers.

Grobet spent some time as a painter before focussing on photography. Her photography led her to explore lucha libre, and she spent a lot of time getting to know the luchadores (wrestlers). Grobet did some theatre and video, and published several books. Grobet's work has been the subject of numerous exhibitions, and she received many grants and awards for her work.

== Early life ==
Grobet was born in México City, where she grew up with her parents. Grobet took a formal painting class at the Academy of San Carlos. Her parents did not like the views of the school and sent her to work under a Catholic professor named José Suárez Olvera, who painted murals for the Church of San Francisco. She did not care for his work much because she felt it lacked originality. Grobet asked herself what art is: “Looking around, and after asking myself the inevitable questions about what art is, it became clear that for me it was a language, a way of saying things, and so I had to find the best way of saying them.”

== Education ==
Grobet studied plastic arts at the Universidad Iberoamericana in Mexico and graphic design and photography in Britain at the Cardiff College of Art and Derby College for Higher Education. She was very moved by her professor Mathias Goeritz, from whom she learned that mass media showed a new way of expression. When Goeritz gave up teaching, he asked Grobet to be his assistant while he worked on stained glassed windows for the México City Cathedral. She studied in England in 1977 and did a few landscape paintings. She ended up failing, however, because the photography faculty did not like that she altered the landscape and strayed away from keeping it purely documentary.

== Career ==
Kati Horna introduced Grobet to the world of photography, though the main influences in her early career were Mathias Goeritz, Gilberto Aceves Navarro, El Santo and others.

Grobet studied as a painter in Mexico for some time and then took a trip to Paris in 1968; it changed her life and the way that she viewed the art world.

While she was in Paris, Grobet visited many art galleries and discovered kinetic art; because of this, she liked working with multimedia. She spent some time working at a jazz concert, controlling lighting and kinetic projections. When Grobet returned to Mexico, she decided that she wanted to focus on photography; after she got back home, she decided to burn all of her old work and start over.

In 1981 Grobet released her first set of photographs. At the beginning of her career in photography, she was part of a group called Consejo Mexicano de Fotografía (Mexican Council of Photography), formed by Pedro Meyer in 1977. With her participation in this group, she was able to revitalize photography in Mexico, which led to a movement called the Grupos. Grobet was focused on establishing a community-based perspective.

Grobet spent some time with indigenous people during a time of great struggle for them. She took the time to learn more about them and photograph them in a theatrical way. She wanted to relate to indigenous people using her artistic initiative, so they made costumes and scenery of their own and she then took their photos. Later on, Grobet took interest in the Mayan culture. Wanting to learn more about the Mayans she went to the suburbs; while this was not a common thing to do, she wanted to steer clear of any tourists. She wanted to get accurate information about the people she documented and explore an area less traveled. She discovered temples that were made by an unknown civilization and she decided they were to be called the Olmayazetec.

After her education and her travels, Grobet came back to México City. She once again started to explore her childhood interest of luchadores. She found that there was very little information pertaining to the luchadores, and so she decided that she wanted to make them more known to the world.

Grobet spent thirty years devoted to taking pictures of the luchadores and studying their way of life. She spent time photographing lucha libre wrestlers inside and outside of the ring, both in their masks, but also in their own homes. Grobet wanted to show that they lived normal lives, just like everyone else. She got very close with well known Lucha Libre wrestlers such as: El Santo, Blue Demon, Mil Mascaras, Sagrada, Octagon, Misioneros de la Muerte, Los Perros del Mal, and Los Brazos. Influenced greatly by Mathias Goeritz, the Polish sculptor from Gdańsk, and by Gilberto Aceves Navarro, a Mexican master of art murals, who were her teachers, Grobet worked on pictures of El Santo, one of the most important Mexican wrestlers, and a hero of lucha libre who starred in more than 50 films. Since 1975, she has published more than 11,000 photographs of the sport, including those on the sport in the United States since the 1930s, and as an important part of Mexican popular culture, adopting a sociological attitude. The sport involves many costumes and masks, leading it to a sport-carnival air which is much appreciated by Mexicans.

She also ventured into cinema. In her 2013 movie Bering. Balance and Resistance, Grobet questions the political separation between the Big Diomede Island (Russia) and the Little Diomede Island (USA) in the Bering Strait, a border between the United States and Russia. Showing the consequences of the separation between both Islands. After the American-Soviet conflict of the 21st century, the Beringia region was divided in two, which caused the separation of complete Nanook families and also, paradoxically, separated the place where the first human beings that populated the American continent crossed.

Grobet has had over one hundred exhibitions of her photographs, both group and solo exhibitions. She had her work exhibited at the London Mexfest festival in 2012. She won an award at the Second Biennal in Fine Art Photography. In 1975, for the exhibition Hora y media, she transformed a gallery into a photographic laboratory. She developed the photographs, but without fixing them, and displayed them on three walls. While the public looked at the photographs, the lights from the gallery made it look like they disappeared.

In 1977, Grobet presented Travelling, an exhibition of photography on an escalator. Among her other works were Paisajes pintados, Teatro campesino, Strip Tease.

== Personal life ==
Grobet married Xavier Pérez Barba in 1962 and they had four children together. They divorced in 1974.

== Death ==
Grobet died on 15 July 2022 in México City.

== Work and process ==
As Grobet was taking her photographs, she desired to understand reality better. According to Grobet, and as noted in her 2005 book Lourdes Grobet, "she has used this photographic experience as an inductive process in order to understand or 'live' reality (or realities) rather than illustrate certain preconceived ideas. She is not scared to employ different (sometimes contradictory) languages available to her to speak of her particular experience and standpoint, thus sacrificing formal purism. In her own way, Grobet manages to use photography to relate to herself, to relate to us and to take action in the problematic reality that is Mexico."

Some of Grobet's work was collaborative, while others she liked to do on her own time. When photographing the luchadores she wanted to show their tough side, but she also wanted to show their fragile side as well. Grobet wanted to uncover the roots of the lucha libre. She wanted to show that the lucha libre is important to the culture of Mexico, with links back to the time of the Aztecs. Grobet found that there was not much information about these fascinating luchadores. She wanted the luchadores to get the recognition they deserve as some of Mexico's important cultural figures.

== Awards ==
- 1982: Photographic Biennal award, Mexico
- 1984: Libro Propositivo Award, Mexico
- 1988: Best Monument Award for commemoration of 20th Anniversary of Tlatelolco massacre, with the group Proceso Pentagono, Mexico
- 1988: Best Book Award, Juan Pablos Editions, Mexico
- 1992: International Award, Latin American Emancipation and Identity 1492–1992, contest, Quito, Equador
- 1995-1998 Sistema Nacional de Creadores de Arte (SNCA) Grant, Secretariat of Culture, Mexico
- 1996: Banff Centre for Arts and Creativity Residency, Canada
- 1999-2001: SNCA Grant, Secretariat of Culture, Mexico
- 2001: Yaddo Residency, United States
- 2002: MacDowell Residency, United States
- 2003: Bellagio Residency, Italy
- 2005-2006: FONCA grant, Mexico
- 2007: MacDowell Residency, United States
- 2010-2011: FONCA grant, Mexico

== Solo exhibitions ==
Year	Location	Venue	Title	Notes	Ref
1970	México City, Mexico	Galería Misrachi	Serendípiti		
1974	México City, Mexico	Casa del Lago	A La Mesa		
1975	México City, Mexico	Casa del Lago	Hora y Media		
1977	Derby, England		Travelling Exhibition	Derby-México City	
1977-1991	Derby, England		Paisajes Pintados		
1980, 1982, 1985, 1991			Lucha Libre	México City-Chicago-Havana-Amsterdam	
1983	México City, Mexico	Museo Universitario del Chopo	53 Cuadros		
1988	México City, Mexico	Café la Gloria	Los Manteles de Septiembre		
1990	México City, Mexico	Gilardi Gallery	Neo-Olmayaztec		
1992			¿De qué conquista hablamos?	México City-Quito	
1995	Erfurt, Germany		La Máscara en la Cultura Mexicana		
1996	Banff, Canada	Banff Centre for the Arts	Pop, Mass and Sub-culture		
1996	México City, Mexico	Centro de la Imagen	La Filomena		
1997	Oaxaca City, Mexico	Centro Fotográfico Álvarez Bravo	Tres Caídas		
2000	México City, Mexico	Ex-Teresa	Prometeo Unisex	Video installation	
2000	Tijuana, Mexico	Tijuana Cultural Center	Lucha Libre		
2005	Alicante, Spain	Alicante University	Paisajes Pintados		
2005	New York City, USA		Black Party		
2005	New York City, USA	Bruce Silverstein Gallery	Lourdes Grobet: Retrospective		
2006	México City, Mexico	Three subway stations	Lucha Libre		
2007	Madrid, Spain	Foto España	Lucha Libre		
2008	Paris, France	Musée du Quai Branly	Upside Down Les Artiques		
2008	México City, Mexico	Mexican Social Security Institute	La Mano Negra		
2009	México City, Mexico	Museo Archivo de la Fotografía	Equilibrium & Resistance		
2010	México City, Mexico	Galería Metropolitana	Equilibrium & Resistance		
2010	Kuala Lumpur, Malaysia	National Museum of Art	Espectacular de Lucha Libre		
2012	Nîmes, France	NegPos Centre d’Art et de Photographie	El nuevo hombre de Bering		
2013	Miami, USA	Mexican Consulate	Wrestling		
2015	Barcelona, Spain	Centre de Cultura Contemporània de Barcelona			

== Theatre, film, and video ==
Year	Location	Venue	Type	Title	Notes	Ref
1978-1992			Theatre		Theatre collaborations with Susana Alexander	
1983-1984	México City, Mexico	Casa del Lago	Performance	De Mugir a Mujer		
1986-2001	Mexico		Photographs		For Teatro Campesino e Indígena theatre group	
1990	Great Britain		Film	Lucha Libre	BBC London	
1992	France		Interview	Lucha Libre		
1995-2000	Mexico		Videos		For Teatro Campesino e Indígena theatre group	
1996	México City, Mexico	Centro de la Imagen		Luz y Fer		
2000	México City, Mexico	ExTeresa Arte Actual		Prometheus Unisex		
2000-2009	México City, Mexico	Museo Archivo de la Fotografía		Frontier		
2000-2009	Paris, France	Musée du Quai Branly		Prometheus Unisex		
2001	Brazil	Video Biennal	Video	Frontier		
2002	New York City, USA	36th New York Expo	Film and video			
2003	México City, Mexico	Museo de Arte Moderno		As-Is		
2005	Alicante, Spain	University of Alicante		Grobet Witch Project		
2006	México City, Mexico			Luboulos on Line		
2008-2009	México City, Mexico	Museo Archivo de la Fotografía		Fluxus		
2008-2009	Paris, France	Musée du Quai Branly		Fluxus		
2009-2010	México City, Mexico	Museo Archivo de la Fotografía		Interactiv, Images of BeringStrait		
2010	Mexico			On Human Scale	Work of sculptor Helen Escobedo	
2011	Mexico			Hear the Silence	Work of sculptor Helen Escobedo	
2012	Nîmes, France	NegPos Centre d’Art et de Photographie		The New Man of Bering		
2013	Bering Strait		Documentary	Equilibrium & Resistance		

== Collections ==
- Brooklyn Museum, Brooklyn, USA
- Fundación Cultural Televisa, Mexico
- Centro de la Imagen, México City, Mexico
- Harry Ransom Center, University of Texas at Austin, Austin, USA
- Musée du Quai Branly, Paris, France
- The Museum of Fine Arts, Houston, USA
- San Francisco Museum of Modern Art, San Francisco, USA
- Museum of Latin American Art, Long Beach, USA

== Publications ==
- 1982: Se Escoge el Tiempo. Los Talleres, México City.
- 1984: Luciérnagas (a published collection of loose photographs). E.N.A.P. México City.
- 1987: Bodas de Sangre. Tabasco County Government.
- 1996: Santo y Seña de los Recintos Históricos de la Universidad de México. ISBN 968-36-4630-1.
- 2005: Lourdes Grobet. Turner Publicaciones, Spain. ISBN 84-7506-620-8.
- 2005: Lucha Libre: Masked Superstars of Mexican Wrestling. ISBN 1-933045-05-1.
- 2007: Retratos de Familia. Reverté Editores, Mexico/Spain. ISBN 6077515051.
- 2008: Espectacular de Lucha Libre. Trilce Editions, México City. ISBN 968-9044-16-8.
- 2008: Lucha Libre Mexicana (with Gabriel Rodríguez) ISBN 968-9044-17-6
