= The Coldest Case in Laramie =

True crime podcast

- Genre: Investigative journalism; Serialized audio narrative
- Language: English

Cast and voices
- Hosted by: Kim Barker

Music
- Theme music composed by: Kwame Brandt-Pierce

Production
- Production: Alvin Melathe
- Editing: Julie Snyder
- Length: 4h 2m

Technical specifications
- Audio format: Podcast (via streaming or downloadable MP3)

Publication
- No. of seasons: 1
- No. of episodes: 8
- Original release: February 23 – February 23, 2023

Related
- Website: Link to NYT Podcast

The Coldest Case in Laramie is a true crime podcast produced by Serial Productions and The New York Times and hosted by Kim Barker. The eight-episode podcast debuted on February 23, 2023.

The podcast is about a cold case, the unsolved murder of Shelli Wiley, a 22-year-old student at the University of Wyoming, that took place in 1985, in Laramie, Wyoming. After she was killed her home was set on fire. Barker, who grew up in Laramie and has worked as a war reporter in Afghanistan and as a correspondent in New Delhi and Islamabad, started investigating the case during the COVID-19 pandemic.

The podcast contains archival audio related to the case. The show was criticized by James Marriott in The Times, who said that "the idea that anyone could consider this horrible tragedy a promising source of entertainment baffles me".
