= Brennan Brown =

American actor (born 1968)

- Born: November 23, 1968 (age 57); Los Angeles, California, U.S.
- Education: Yale University (MFA)
- Occupation: Actor
- Years active: 2000–present
- Spouse: Jenna Stern (m. 1998)
- Children: 1

Brennan Brown (born November 23, 1968) is an American film, television, and stage actor. He currently plays Dr. Samuel Abrams on NBC's Chicago Med. He played Robert Childan on Amazon's Man in the High Castle. He is a fan of the New York Yankees.

== Career ==
He received his MFA in acting from the Yale School of Drama.

He first came to widespread attention in the UK for playing "Mr. Dresden", a film board executive in Orange UK's long-running series of spoof cinema adverts. Brown's other film and television credits include I Love You Phillip Morris with Jim Carrey; Focus opposite Will Smith and Margot Robbie; State of Play; Turn the River; two seasons playing Edward Biben on Amazon's Mozart in the Jungle; HBO's John Adams playing Robert Treat Paine; and two seasons playing Special Agent Nicholas Donnelly on Person of Interest.

Brown has appeared in numerous Broadway and Off-Broadway stage productions. At The Atlantic Theatre, he appeared in Harold Pinter's Celebration and Ethan Cohen's Offices. At The National Actor's Theatre, he appeared in Aeschylus' The Persians and Pirandello's Right You Are (If You Think You Are). He played Snobby Price in The Roundabout Theatre Company's Major Barbara.

== Filmography ==
Year	Series/Film	Role	Notes
2000-2001	Law & Order: Special Victims Unit	Attorney Brendan Walsh; Defense Attorney	"Asunder" "Paranoia" (uncredited)
2001	Deadline	Engineer	"Somebody's Fool"
2001	The Education of Max Bickford	Ron Zinn	"A Very Great Man"
2001–2009	Law & Order	Forensic Technician	Season 12, Episode 12 "Teenage Wasteland"
2001–2009	Law & Order	Donald Houseman	Season 13, Episode 5 "The Ring"
2001–2009	Law & Order	Attorney Hoyt	Season 20, Episode 8 "Doped"
2002	Monday Night Mayhem	Bob Goodrich	TV movie
2003–2009	Law & Order: Criminal Intent	Jerry Rivers & Merrill	2 episodes
2006	Kidnapped	Paul Levine	"Sorry, Wrong Number"
2007	The Girl in the Park	Man Fan	Feature film
2007	Turn the River	Randolph	Feature film
2008	John Adams	Robert Treat Paine	Miniseries, 2 episodes
2008	Gossip Girl	Mr. Smith	"Bonfire of the Vanity"
2009	I Love You Phillip Morris	Larry Birkheim	Feature film
2009	Damages	Arthur Phillips	"I Agree, It Wasn't Funny"
2009	State of Play	Andrew Pell	Feature film
2009	Ugly Betty	Miles Foster	2 episodes
2010	Billy Green	The LA Executive	Unknown episodes
2010	Agatha Christie's Marple	Hailey Preston	"The Mirror Crack'd from Side to Side"
2011	Detachment	Greg Raymond	Feature film
2012–2013	Person of Interest	Special Agent Nicholas Donnelly	9 episodes
2013	Gilded Lilys	Mr. Lavage	TV movie
2013	Breaking Bad	US Attorney	"Granite State"
2014	The Blacklist	Dr. Nikolaus Vogel	"Berlin (No. 8)"
2014	Elementary	Kevin Elspeth	"Enough Nemesis To Go Around"
2014	Sleepy Hollow	Tom	"The Indispensable Man"
2014–2015	Beauty & the Beast	Captain/Chief Ward	8 episodes
2014–2015	Mozart in the Jungle	Edward Biben	8 episodes
2015	Focus	Horst	Feature film
2015–2019	The Man in the High Castle	Robert Childan	Main role (seasons 2–4), recurring (season 1)
2015–present	Chicago Med	Dr. Sam Abrams	Recurring role
2018	The Sinner	Lionel Jeffries	3 episodes
2019	The Wolf Hour	Hans	Feature film
2019	Midway	Commander Joseph Rochefort	Feature film
2019	Bull	Attorney Steve Perry	"Labor Days"
2022	Not Okay	Harold	Feature film
2025	The Beast in Me	Councilman Phineas Gold	2 episodes

== Theatre ==
- Played David in Owen O'Neill's Absolution in 2002.
- Played Richard III in the play of the same name, and Tomas in The Imaginary Invalid at Yale Repertory Theatre.
- Played Snobby Price in the Broadway production of Major Barbara.
- Performed in New York in the play The Second Man at the Keen Theatre, as well as in Asylum and Fair Night at Naked Angels

== Video games ==
- Manhunt 2—Watchdogs member (2007)
- Red Dead Redemption—Strange Man, The Local Population (2010)
