= Whiskey Tango Foxtrot (film) =

2016 film by Glenn Ficarra and John Requa

- Theatrical release poster
- Directed by: Glenn Ficarra; John Requa
- Written by: Robert Carlock
- Based on: The Taliban Shuffle: Strange Days in Afghanistan and Pakistan by Kim Barker
- Produced by: Lorne Michaels; Tina Fey; Ian Bryce
- Starring: Tina Fey; Margot Robbie; Martin Freeman; Alfred Molina; Billy Bob Thornton
- Cinematography: Xavier Grobet
- Edited by: Jan Kovac
- Music by: Nick Urata
- Production companies: Broadway Video; Little Stranger
- Distributed by: Paramount Pictures
- Release date: March 4, 2016
- Running time: 112 minutes
- Country: United States
- Language: English
- Budget: $35 million
- Box office: $25.4 million

Whiskey Tango Foxtrot is a 2016 American biographical war comedy-drama film, directed by Glenn Ficarra and John Requa and written by Robert Carlock. Based on the memoir The Taliban Shuffle: Strange Days in Afghanistan and Pakistan by Kim Barker, the adaptation's title spells WTF in the military standard NATO phonetic alphabet.

The film stars Tina Fey, Margot Robbie, Martin Freeman, Alfred Molina, and Billy Bob Thornton and was released on March 4, 2016, by Paramount Pictures. It received mixed reviews from critics, who praised the acting but criticized the predictable screenplay and execution, and grossed $24 million against its $35 million budget.

== Plot ==
In 2003 New York City, Kim Baker is a struggling television journalist covering low-profile stories. To help her career, she takes a short assignment as a war correspondent in Afghanistan during Operation Enduring Freedom, to the disappointment of her boyfriend Chris.

Assigned to modest living quarters with other international journalists, Kim befriends noted BBC correspondent Tanya Vanderpoel and lecherous Scottish freelance photographer Iain MacKelpie. She adjusts to her new duties aided by her Afghan "fixer" Fahim Ahmadzai. She elicits frank remarks on camera from soldiers questioning the value of their assignment and puts herself in harm's way to capture combat incidents on video. Marine General Hollanek sees her as an inexperienced nuisance. Despite the danger, Kim stays in Afghanistan for years beyond her original assignment. She catches Chris with another woman during a middle-of-the-night video call, ending their relationship and her sexual flirtation with Iain develops into something more meaningful.

Although Afghan Islamic society places restrictive roles on women, she uses her sex to her advantage and gains access to female villagers who have been sabotaging the US-built well because they welcome the daily walk to the river away from the men. She uses her own sexuality to develop Afghan Attorney General Ali Massoud Sadiq as a news source. Fahim, who treated opium addicts before the war, cautions her that danger can be as dangerous as a drug. Despite their mutual friendliness, Kim competes with other journalists for stories and resources from their employers. After three years in Afghanistan, Kim flies to New York to argue for more support from her network's new boss, and discovers Tanya is slated to take over her Afghan assignment.

Iain is kidnapped for ransom while covering a developing story he had offered to share with Kim. She returns to Afghanistan and blackmails Ali for information about Iain's whereabouts, impressing on Hollanek the political value of rescuing Iain. The mission is a success, militarily and journalistically but Kim becomes disillusioned with her tentative relationship with Iain and her station. She returns to the United States for good, and looks up a Marine whose on-camera comments to her might have led to his transfer and subsequent loss of his legs to an IED. She tries to apologize to him but he refuses to let her take the blame.

Kim takes an on-camera desk job and finds herself interviewing Iain, who will be in New York as part of a new book tour. He invites her to meet him for coffee.

== Cast ==
- Tina Fey as Kim Baker, a cable news reporter.
- Margot Robbie as Tanya Vanderpoel, a British BBC News TV journalist whom Kim admires and befriends.
- Martin Freeman as Iain MacKelpie, Kim's unexpected love interest and a dedicated Scottish photojournalist.
- Christopher Abbott as Fahim Ahmadzai, who acts as driver, translator, and all-around handyman for reporters.
- Billy Bob Thornton as Colonel later Brigadier General Hollanek, US Marine Corps, a military man who initially scares Kim.
- Alfred Molina as Ali Massoud Sadiq, a local official who has a romantic interest in Kim.
- Sheila Vand as Shakira El-Khoury, a Lebanese reporter who works alongside Kim and Tanya.
- Nicholas Braun as Tall Brian, Kim's cameraman.
- Steve Peacocke as Nic, Kim's Canadian alpha male bodyguard with a disguised Australian accent.
- Evan Jonigkeit as Lance Corporal Coughlin, a member of 3rd Battalion, 5th Marines when Baker is embedded.
- Scott Takeda as Ed Faber.
- Josh Charles as Chris, Kim's boyfriend back in the States.
- Cherry Jones as Geri Taub.
- Sterling K. Brown as Sergeant Hurd, another member of 3rd Battalion, 5th Marines.
- Thomas Kretschmann as an airplane passenger.

== Production ==
In February 2014, Tina Fey confirmed that her production company, Little Stranger, would adapt the memoir The Taliban Shuffle: Strange Days in Afghanistan and Pakistan by Kim Barker of the Chicago Tribune into a film. Fey would star in the lead role in the film, which would be produced by Lorne Michaels and written by Robert Carlock. On June 30, 2014, Paramount tapped Glenn Ficarra and John Requa to direct the film. On October 22, 2014, Margot Robbie joined the cast to play a competing reporter alongside Fey's character. On November 20, 2014, Martin Freeman was in talks to play Fey's character's unexpected love interest, a dedicated Scottish photojournalist. On January 10, 2015, it was reported that Nikolaj Coster-Waldau was in talks to join the film for a male lead role, although he did not ultimately star in the film. On February 2, 2015, Christopher Abbott joined the film's cast. On February 3, 2015, Nicholas Braun joined the film to play Tall Brian, Fey's character's cameraman, and the film had the working title Fun House. On February 9, 2015, Steve Peacocke was set to star in the film, playing Nic, Fey's character's alpha male bodyguard. On February 11, 2015, confirmed cast was announced, with Billy Bob Thornton, Alfred Molina, Sheila Vand, and Evan Jonigkeit also joining the cast of the film, in which Vand would play Shakira El-Khoury, a Lebanese reporter who works alongside Kim and Tanya.

Fey confirmed that the film's title would be Whiskey Tango Foxtrot in an interview with USA Today. Kim Barker was changed to a cable news reporter named "Baker".

=== Filming ===
On February 3, 2015, the Albuquerque Journal reported that filming was underway in Santa Fe, New Mexico. Fey was spotted filming in the Santa Fe University of Art and Design. On February 11, 2015, Paramount also confirmed that principal photography had commenced on the film in New Mexico. It was filmed in part at the historic Scottish Rite Temple in Santa Fe. Production on the film concluded on April 10, 2015.

=== Release ===
The film was originally titled The Taliban Shuffle and Fun House, before settling on Whiskey Tango Foxtrot. It was released on March 4, 2016. At the beginning of the rolling credits is a dedication to Fey's father, Donald Henry Fey, who died in 2015.

=== Home media ===
Whiskey Tango Foxtrot was released on DVD and Blu-ray on June 28, 2016.

== Reception ==
=== Box office ===
Whiskey Tango Foxtrot grossed $23.1 million in North America and $1.8 million in other territories for a total of $24.9 million worldwide, against a production budget of $35 million.

In the United States and Canada, pre-release tracking suggested the film would gross $10–12 million from 2,374 theaters in its opening weekend, trailing fellow newcomers Zootopia ($60–70 million projection) and London Has Fallen ($20–23 million projection). The film ended up grossing $7.6 million in its opening weekend, finishing below expectations and 4th at the box office.

=== Critical response ===
On review aggregator website Rotten Tomatoes, the film holds an approval rating of 68% based on 209 reviews, with an average rating of 6.33/10. The site's critical consensus reads, "While WTF is far from FUBAR, Tina Fey and Martin Freeman are just barely enough to overcome the picture's glib predictability and limited worldview." Metacritic gives the film a weighted average score of 57 out of 100, based on 44 critics, indicating "mixed or average reviews". Audiences polled by CinemaScore gave the film an average grade of "B" on an A+ to F scale.
