= I Love You Phillip Morris =

2009 film by John Requa and Glenn Ficarra

- Theatrical release poster
- Directed by: John Requa; Glenn Ficarra
- Screenplay by: John Requa; Glenn Ficarra
- Based on: I Love You Phillip Morris: A True Story of Life, Love, and Prison Breaks by Steve McVicker
- Produced by: Andrew Lazar; Far Shariat
- Starring: Jim Carrey; Ewan McGregor; Rodrigo Santoro; Antoni Corone; Leslie Mann
- Cinematography: Xavier Pérez Grobet
- Edited by: Thomas J. Nordberg
- Music by: Nick Urata
- Production companies: EuropaCorp; Mad Chance Productions
- Distributed by: LD Entertainment; Roadside Attractions
- Release dates: January 18, 2009 (Sundance); December 3, 2010 (United States)
- Running time: 98 minutes
- Country: United States
- Language: English
- Budget: $13 million
- Box office: $20.7 million

I Love You Phillip Morris is a 2009 American biographical romantic comedy film based on the 1980s and 1990s real-life story of con artist, impostor and multiple prison escapee Steven Jay Russell, as played by Jim Carrey. While incarcerated, Russell falls in love with his fellow inmate, Phillip Morris (Ewan McGregor). After Morris is released from prison, Russell escapes from prison four times to be reunited with Morris.

The film was directed by John Requa and Glenn Ficarra in their directorial debut, adapted from the 2003 non-fiction novel I Love You Phillip Morris: A True Story of Life, Love, and Prison Breaks by Steve McVicker.

I Love You Phillip Morris premiered at the 2009 Sundance Film Festival on January 18, 2009, before being released by LD Entertainment and Roadside Attractions on December 3, 2010 in the United States, and at the Director's Fortnight of the 62nd Cannes Film Festival in France. It grossed $20 million worldwide and received generally positive reviews from critics, with Carrey's performance received particular praise. For numerous accolades, the film won the GLAAD Media Award for Outstanding Film – Limited Release at the 22nd GLAAD Media Awards, and received a nomination for the Writers Guild of America Award for Best Adapted Screenplay to Requa and Ficarra.

== Plot ==
Steven Jay Russell is on his deathbed, recalling the events of his life that led him to this point. He spent his early adult years in Virginia Beach as a police officer. He plays the organ at church, has unenthusiastic sex with his wife, Debbie, and spends his off-hours searching for his biological mother, who had placed him for adoption as a child. Steven locates his biological mother, but she rejects him. He then quits the police force and moves to Texas and works for Sysco, the family business.

After a car crash on the way from a homosexual tryst, Steven leaves his family and life behind, though he keeps in touch with his wife and young daughter, and explores the world as his true self – a gay man. He moves to Miami, where he finds a boyfriend, Jimmy, and they adopt a luxurious lifestyle. To keep themselves in the style to which they have become accustomed, Steven becomes a con man. He is pursued by the police, and, after jumping off a parking garage, is sent to prison, where he falls in love with inmate Phillip Morris.

Steven cannot bear to be separated from Phillip. After being released, he helps get Phillip freed from prison by posing as a lawyer, then attains wealth by fraudulently acquiring a position as Chief Financial Officer of a large medical management company called USAMM (United States of America Medical Management).

Steven is eventually caught embezzling. While in the police car, he reminisces about Jimmy in Florida, dying of AIDS. He asks the police for Phillip's insulin and injects himself. Steven survives and goes back to prison. He repeatedly escapes in several cleverly engineered ways, but gets caught and sent back every time. After his latest escape, Steven goes to visit Phillip, but Phillip eventually realizes that Steven isn't even a real lawyer, and Steven is arrested yet again shortly after. He goes back to prison, where Phillip is also sent as an accomplice and angrily tells Steven he never wants to see him again. Months later, Phillip learns from another inmate that Steven is dying of AIDS. Heartbroken, Phillip calls Steven while he is in the infirmary and confesses that, while he is still upset with Steven for lying to him, he still loves him. Phillip is later told that Steven has died.

Some time later, Phillip is taken to meet with his lawyer and finds Steven waiting for him. Steven describes how he faked dying of AIDS, to be allowed to see Phillip again, and promises never to lie to him again. He runs one last con to break Phillip out of prison, only to be caught when he runs into an old co-worker from USAMM, who is on jury duty.

The end of the movie explains that the real-life Phillip was released from prison in 2006; but Steven was given a life sentence and is in 23-hour lockup, only having one free hour a day to shower and exercise, which the film implies to be because an official involved in the sentencing had a brother-in-law who was conned by Russell.

The last scene shows Steven laughing joyfully while running across the prison yard, guards in pursuit, in another attempt to be with Phillip.

== Cast ==
- Jim Carrey as Steven Russell
- Ewan McGregor as Phillip Morris
- Leslie Mann as Debbie
- Rodrigo Santoro as Jimmy
- Antoni Corone as Lindholm
- Brennan Brown as Birkheim
- Michael Mandell as Cleavon

In addition, Phillip Morris has an uncredited cameo as Steven's lawyer during the movie-end court scene.

== Production ==
After original difficulty finding an American distributor, likely due to its explicit gay sexual content, the film was re-edited. In May 2009, it was announced by Variety that Consolidated Pictures Group had acquired the rights for distribution.

Portions of the film were filmed at the Louisiana State Penitentiary (also known as Angola) in West Feliciana Parish, Louisiana. A Christian blogger stated that warden Burl Cain did not permit one sex scene between two male inmates to be filmed at the prison. The real Phillip Morris appears in a cameo as Steven's lawyer in one of the final scenes.

== Release ==
The film was released in Europe, Taiwan and Japan between February and April 2010. Although a limited run in the United States was initially scheduled for April 12, 2009, it was later reported that the film's release had been indefinitely postponed by its distributors, Consolidated Pictures Group but on April 30, 2009, Variety announced the distributor had had a change of heart and that I Love You Phillip Morris would be shown in limited theaters starting June 30 before expanding nationwide on July 6.

On August 3, 2009, the film was delayed yet again due to legal battles. The film was finally released on October 30, 2009, after Roadside Attractions and Liddell Entertainment acquired the rights to distribute in the United States.

=== Box office ===
I Love You Phillip Morris had a worldwide gross of $20,768,906 as of April 14, 2011.

== Reception ==
Rotten Tomatoes has a 71% critic rating based on 161 reviews and an average score of 6.6/10. The critical consensus is: "This fact-based romantic comedy has its flaws, but they're mostly overcome by its consistently sweet, funny tone and one of the best performances of Jim Carrey's career." On Metacritic, the film has a weighted average score of 65 out of 100, based on 32 critics, indicating "generally favorable reviews".

Steve Persall from the Tampa Bay Times wrote, "Think Catch Me If You Can mashed up with Brokeback Mountain if Mel Brooks directed and you'll get the idea. John Anderson of Variety remarked, "Less of a comedy than a hilarious tragedy, I Love You Phillip Morris stars Jim Carrey in his most complicated comedic role since The Cable Guy." Empire wrote, "One of the funniest films of the year, this is a wonderful mix of old-school Carrey outrageousness with a genuinely touching – and very modern – love story."

Damon Wise of The Times gave the film four stars out of five, stating, "I Love You Phillip Morris is an extraordinary film that serves as a reminder of just how good Carrey can be when he's not tied into a generic Hollywood crowd-pleaser. His comic timing remains as exquisite as ever." Xan Brooks of The Guardian also gave the film a positive review, describing the movie as "fast, funny and rather daring. A whisk of caffeine with a center that's sweet."

== Italy controversy ==
The distribution and promotion of the film in Italy by its Italian distributor Lucky Red was strongly criticized. The advertising campaign (posters, trailers, and TV commercials) was accused of minimizing the homosexual themes of the film to present it as a simple comedy, removing the romantic relationship between Steven and Phillip in the film with the aim of attracting a larger audience. Ewan McGregor was removed from the billing list in the trailer. Lucky Red later claimed to have purchased from its distributor and production company EuropaCorp a "softer" version of the original, in which most of the homosexual sex scenes between the protagonists Steven and Phillip were removed.

== Home media ==
The film was released on DVD and Blu-ray Disc on April 5, 2011.

== Soundtrack ==
I Love You Phillip Morris: Original Soundtrack

Soundtrack album by Various Artists
- Genre: Soundtrack
- Length: 40:25

I Love You Phillip Morris: Original Soundtrack was composed by Nick Urata.

No.	Title	Artist	Length
1.	"I Cried Like a Silly Boy"	DeVotchKa	3:27
2.	"Dance Hall Days"	Jack Hues	4:00
3.	"Key West"	Nick Urata	0:53
4.	"Jesus Has a Plan"	Nick Urata	2:14
5.	"To Love Somebody"	Nina Simone	2:41
6.	"Written in the Stars"	Nick Urata	3:59
7.	"Nobody Knows the Trouble I've Seen" (Golden Gate Quartet)	Orlandus Wilson	3:16
8.	"Promise to Jimmy"	Nick Urata	2:31
9.	"The Escape Artist"	Nick Urata	4:36
10.	"The Last Time"	Nick Urata	3:00
11.	"Steal Away"	Robbie Dupree	3:31
12.	"Faking Death"	Nick Urata	2:44
13.	"The Marriage of Figaro: Sull'aria"	German Opera Orchestra of Berlin	3:33
