= Back in the Game (2013 TV series) =

- Genre: Sitcom
- Created by: Mark Cullen; Robb Cullen
- Starring: James Caan; Maggie Lawson; Ben Koldyke; Griffin Gluck; Lenora Crichlow; Kennedy Waite; Josie Totah (Note: Credited as J. J. Totah; she came out as transgender in 2018.); Cooper Roth; Brandon Selgado-Telis
- Composer: Ryan Beveridge
- Country of origin: United States
- Original language: English
- No. of seasons: 1
- No. of episodes: 13 (3 unaired)

Production
- Executive producers: Aaron Kaplan; Glenn Ficarra; John Requa; Mark Cullen; Robb Cullen
- Camera setup: Single-camera
- Running time: 22 minutes
- Production companies: Kapital Entertainment; Cullen Bros. Television; 20th Century Fox Television

Original release
- Network: ABC
- Release: September 25, 2013 – February 23, 2014

Back in the Game is an American sitcom about a newly divorced single mother who has to move back home to live with her ex-minor league baseball manager father. It aired from September 25, 2013, to February 23, 2014, on ABC. The series stars James Caan and Maggie Lawson and aired during the 2013–14 American television season as a Wednesday night entry. Back in the Game was co-created and executive-produced by brothers Mark and Robb Cullen for 20th Century Fox Television. The series was green-lit by ABC for a series order pickup on May 10, 2013.

On November 1, 2013, ABC announced it was cancelling Back in the Game. Following its tenth aired episode, ABC pulled the series from its schedule and left three episodes unaired. On February 23, 2014, the remaining episodes were released on iTunes, Amazon and other streaming services.

== Cast ==
- Maggie Lawson as Terry Gannon, Jr.
- James Caan as Terry "The Cannon" Gannon, Sr.
- Griffin Gluck as Danny Gannon
- Ben Koldyke as Dick Slingbaugh
- Lenora Crichlow as Gigi Fernandez-Lovette
- Cooper Roth as David Slingbaugh
- Josie Totah as Michael Lovette
- Kennedy Waite as Vanessa
- Brandon Selgado-Telis as Dudley Douglas
- Matthew Zhang as Dong Jing

== Episodes ==
No.	Title	Directed by	Written by	Original release date	Prod. code	U.S. viewers (millions)
1	"Pilot"	John Requa & Glenn Ficarra	Robb & Mark Cullen	September 25, 2013	1AWX79	8.01
2	"Stay In or Bail Out"	Eric Appel	Warren Lieberstein	October 2, 2013	1AWX01	6.71
3	"Play Hard or Go Home"	Eyal Gordin	Gregg Mettler	October 9, 2013	1AWX02	6.53
4	"The Change Up"	Eyal Gordin	Joe Lawson	October 16, 2013	1AWX04	6.35
5	"She. Could. Go. All. The. Way!"	Joe Nussbaum	Eric Goldberg & Peter Tibbals	October 23, 2013	1AWX03	6.27
6	"Night Games"	David Katzenberg	Scott Boden Hodges	October 30, 2013	1AWX05	6.11
7	"Safety Squeeze"	Jeff Melman	Kevin Garnett	November 13, 2013	1AWX06	6.47
8	"No Crying in Baseball"	Charles Minsky	Daisy Gardner	November 20, 2013	1AWX09	6.14
9	"Massive Election"	Eric Appel	Robb & Mark Cullen	December 4, 2013	1AWX10	5.12
10	"I'll Slide Home for Christmas"	Lev L. Spiro	Corinne Kingsbury	December 11, 2013	1AWX08	6.14
11	"Color Barrier"	Lev L. Spiro	Robb and Mark Cullen	February 23, 2014 (Note: Date of release of episode on internet only – this episode was not broadcast on ABC.)	1AWX07	N/A
12	"Sports Therapy"	Michael Patrick Jann	Gregg Mettler	February 23, 2014	1AWX11	N/A
13	"Who's on First"	Charles Minsky	John Requa & Glenn Ficarra	February 23, 2014	1AWX12	N/A

== Broadcast ==
In Canada, City simulcast the ABC broadcast, which debuted on the same day as the American broadcast. In Australia, the series aired on the Nine Network, and debuted on April 9, 2014, where it was originally advertised under the title Mum (the spelling of 'Mom' in Australian English) but later reverted to the original title. In India the show airs on STAR World Premiere HD. In New Zealand, the series premiered on TV2 in 2014. In the United Kingdom, the series premiered on ITV2 on January 20, 2014.

== Reception ==
Kristin Dos Santos of E! Online said that while the show's writing and casting was good, the premise might not be original enough to score a big audience. Robert Bianco of USA Today gave the show 3 out of 4 stars. David Hinckley of the New York Daily News gave the show 2 out of 5 stars. Mary McNamara of the Los Angeles Times said Caan "owns the screen whenever he's on it," Lawson "holds her own," and Crichlow and Gluck's characters were "a delight."
