= Honeymoon with Harry =

American comedy-drama film

- Directed by: Glenn Ficarra; John Requa
- Screenplay by: Dan Fogelman
- Based on: Honeymoon with Harry by Bart Baker
- Produced by: Dan Fogelman; Mike Karz; Jennifer Salke
- Starring: Jake Gyllenhaal; Kevin Costner; Sarah Pidgeon; Rita Ora; Shaggy; Simone Kessell; Nicky Whelan
- Production companies: Rhode Island Ave. Productions; Gulfstream Pictures; Sullivan Street Productions
- Distributed by: Amazon MGM Studios
- Country: United States
- Language: English

Honeymoon with Harry is an upcoming American comedy-drama film directed by Glenn Ficarra and John Requa, from a script by Dan Fogelman. The film stars Jake Gyllenhaal, Kevin Costner, Sarah Pidgeon, Rita Ora, Shaggy, Simone Kessell, and Nicky Whelan.

== Premise ==
A man goes on a honeymoon with his father in law when his fiancé dies two days before his wedding.

== Cast ==
- Jake Gyllenhaal as Todd, a man who goes on a honeymoon solo
- Kevin Costner as Harry, Todd's father in law
- Sarah Pidgeon as Haley, Harry's daughter and Todd's wife
- Rita Ora
- Shaggy
- Simone Kessell
- Nicky Whelan

== Production ==
A film adaptation of Bart Baker's beloved novel Honeymoon with Harry had been in development hell at New Line Cinema since the early 2000s with Paul Haggis initially scripting and signing on to direct the film with Vince Vaughn and Jack Nicholson; in 2010 Jonathan Demme came onboard to direct the script rewritten by Jenny Lumet with Bradley Cooper and Robert De Niro attached to star. In January 2015, Dan Fogelman signed on to rewrite the script with Cooper and De Niro still attached to star. In January 2017, Nick Cassavetes signed on to direct the script by Fogelman.

On August 18, 2025, it was announced that Jake Gyllenhaal and Kevin Costner would star with Glenn Ficarra and John Requa directing the film from the screenplay by Fogelman, who would also produce for Amazon MGM Studios. In March 2026, Sarah Pidgeon joined the cast.

Filming was underway by April 16, 2026, in Brisbane, Australia. Rita Ora and Shaggy joined the cast in mid-April. In May, Simone Kessell joined the cast. In June, Nicky Whelan joined the cast.
