= Steven Jay Russell =

Con-artist with multiple prison escapes

- Born: December 31, 1957 (age 68)
- Occupation: Con artist
- Known for: Multiple successful escapes from several prisons

Steven Jay Russell (born December 31, 1957) is an American con artist, known for escaping from prison multiple times.

I Love You Phillip Morris, a film about his life and crimes, was produced in 2009.

== Life and crimes ==
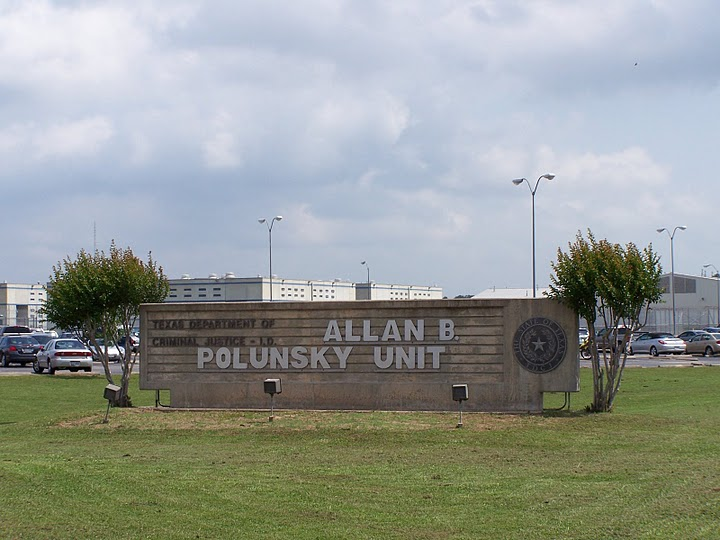
Allan B. Polunsky Unit, where Russell was located

Russell was adopted in 1957 after his birth parents divorced by Georgia and David Russell, whose family owned a produce business. At the age of 18, he began working for the family business, and he also volunteered as a reserve sheriff's deputy and played organ for his church. In 1976, he married Debbie Davis, daughter of the police chief's secretary, and their daughter, Stephanie, was born two years later. Russell and his wife divorced after he revealed to her that he was gay.

Russell began to support himself through a variety of scams including faking slip and fall accidents and selling counterfeit Rolex watches, leading him to be arrested for fraud. In 1995 he began a relationship with fellow inmate Phillip Morris.

On March 20, 1998, Russell posed as a millionaire from Virginia in an attempt to legitimize a $75,000 loan from NationsBank in Dallas; when bank officials became suspicious and alerted the police, Russell feigned a heart attack and was transported to the hospital. Russell was placed on security watch, but he impersonated an FBI agent and called the hospital on his mobile telephone to tell them he could be released.

U.S. Marshals later tracked Russell to Florida, where they arrested him on April 5, 1998, when he went to retrieve a fax. Russell was sentenced to a total of 144 years in prison (99 years for the escapes and 45 years for subsequent scams).

As of 2010, Russell was in the Allan B. Polunsky Unit on a 23-hour lockup, only having one free hour a day to shower and exercise. He was previously held in the Mark W. Michael Unit and the W.J. Estelle Unit. His maximum sentence date was March 13, 2113, and he became eligible for parole on December 15, 2020.

Russell was released from prison on July 16, 2024 after 26 years of incarceration, 16 of which were in solitary confinement. He spent his first day of freedom with Laurence Watts, co-author of the book Life After Philip Morris written in collaboration with Russell himself.

== In media ==
A film about his life and crimes was produced in 2009, named I Love You Phillip Morris, starring Jim Carrey as Russell and Ewan McGregor as his boyfriend Phillip Morris.

Since the movie went into production and Russell's story became more popular, several articles appeared in print and online uncovering lesser known details of his exploits. Esquire magazine interviewed both Russell and Morris for its feature, "The Great Escapee", while The Guardian published "I Love You, Phillip Morris: A Conman's Story".

In 2011, his crimes were featured on the television series I Almost Got Away with It, in the episode "Got A Boyfriend to Support". He was also the subject of "On The Run", a 2005 episode of The Discovery Channel series King of Cons.

== See also ==
- List of people who escaped multiple times from prison
