= Glenn Ficarra =

American screenwriter and director

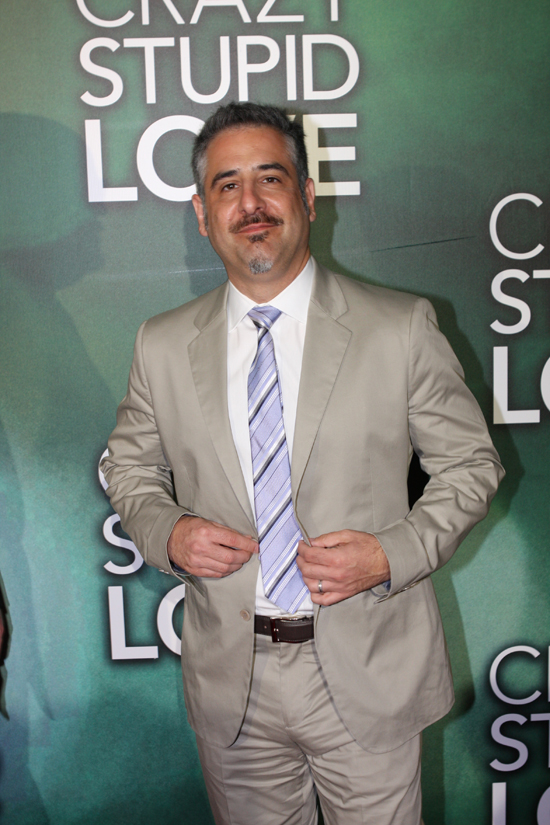
- Glenn Ficarra at the Sydney Crazy, Stupid, Love. premiere in September 2011.
- Occupations: Screenwriter; director; producer

Glenn Ficarra is an American screenwriter, director, and producer. He has frequently collaborated with John Requa.

== Early life ==
Ficarra is the son of Marianne and Robert F. Ficarra, grandchild of Theresa (née Filippone) and Frank Ficarra, and brother of Chris Ficarra. Ficarra attended St. John Vianney High School in Holmdel Township, New Jersey.

Ficarra met John Requa at Pratt Institute, where both were studying film.

== Career ==
After college Requa and Ficarra went to work in animation for the TV channel Nickelodeon.

As writers they wrote the comedy films Cats & Dogs (directed by Lawrence Guterman), Bad Santa (directed by Terry Zwigoff), and Bad News Bears (directed by Richard Linklater).

In 2009 they made their directorial debut with their self-penned I Love You Phillip Morris, based on the life of con man Steven Jay Russell. For their writing on this film, Ficarra and Requa received a nomination for the Writers Guild of America Award for Best Adapted Screenplay.

Their subsequent release was the comedy Crazy, Stupid, Love starring Steve Carell, Ryan Gosling, Emma Stone and Julianne Moore, again directed with Requa, released in July 2011.

With Requa and Charlie Gogolak he has formed the production company Zaftig Films.

The pair also directed Focus, starring Will Smith and Margot Robbie, and Whiskey Tango Foxtrot, starring Tina Fey and Robbie.

== Filmography ==
=== Film ===
Year	Title	Director	Writer	Notes
2001	Cats & Dogs	No	Yes	Also voiced Dimitri Kennelkoff/The Russian, Also credited as co-producer
2003	Looney Tunes: Back in Action	No	Story	
2003	Bad Santa	No	Yes	
2005	Bad News Bears	No	Yes	
2009	I Love You Phillip Morris	Yes	Yes	
2011	Crazy, Stupid, Love	Yes	No	
2015	Focus	Yes	Yes	
2016	Whiskey Tango Foxtrot	Yes	No	
2018	Smallfoot	No	Story	Also producer
2021	Jungle Cruise	No	Yes	
TBA	Honeymoon with Harry	Yes	No	

=== Executive producer ===
- Storks (2016)
- DC League of Super-Pets (2022)

=== Television ===
Year	Title				
Year	Title	Director	Executive Producer	Writer	Notes
1998	The Wild Thornberrys	No	No	Yes	Episode "Flight of the Donnie"
1998–2000	The Angry Beavers	No	No	Yes	16 episodes
2013	Back in the Game	Yes	Yes	Yes	Co-directed "Pilot", co-wrote "Who's on First"
2015–2018	Patriot	No	Yes	No	
2016–2018	This is Us	Yes	Yes	No	7 episodes
2017	Controversy	Yes	Yes	No	TV movie
2020	neXt	Yes	Yes	No	Co-directed 2 episodes
2022	WeCrashed	Yes	Yes	No	
2023	Rabbit Hole	Yes	Yes	Yes	
2025–2026	Paradise	Yes	Yes	No	Co-directed 6 episodes
