= John Requa =

American screenwriter

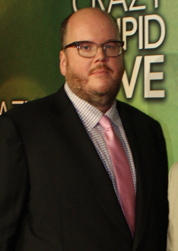
- Occupations: Screenwriter, film director

John Requa is an American screenwriter (with Glenn Ficarra) of Cats & Dogs, Bad Santa and the 2005 remake Bad News Bears.

Requa and Ficarra directed Jim Carrey and Ewan McGregor in their screenplay I Love You Phillip Morris. For their writing on this film, Requa and Ficarra received a nomination for the Writers Guild of America Award for Best Adapted Screenplay.

== Early life ==
Requa grew up in Burien, Washington, a suburb of Seattle, graduating from Burien's Highline High School in 1985.

Requa graduated from the film program at the Pratt Institute in the early 90s. While there he met and began his long association with writing partner Glenn Ficarra.

== Career ==
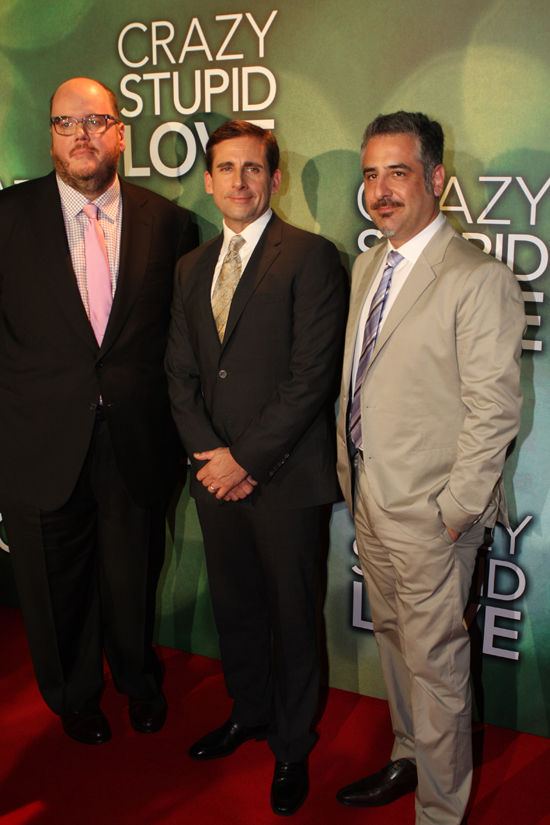
Requa (left) with Steve Carell (center) and Glenn Ficarra at the Sydney Crazy, Stupid, Love. premiere in September 2011

Requa and Ficarra wrote numerous episodes of The Angry Beavers, an animated series on Nickelodeon from 1997 until 2001. Their first episode was season two's Kandid Kreatures which they followed with Dag for Night, Un-Barry-ble, Zooing Time, Sans-a-Pelt and Gonna Getcha. They went on to write eleven more episodes over the remaining three seasons of the show.

The pair directed Focus, starring Will Smith and Margot Robbie, and Whiskey Tango Foxtrot, starring Tina Fey and Robbie. More recently, his Zaftig company signed a deal with Fox Entertainment.

== Filmography ==
=== Film ===
Year	Title			
Year	Title	Director	Writer	Notes
2001	Cats & Dogs	No	Yes	Also co-producer
2003	Looney Tunes: Back in Action	No	Story	
2003	Bad Santa	No	Yes	
2005	Bad News Bears	No	Yes	
2009	I Love You Phillip Morris	Yes	Yes	
2011	Crazy, Stupid, Love	Yes	No	
2015	Focus	Yes	Yes	
2016	Whiskey Tango Foxtrot	Yes	No	
2018	Smallfoot	No	Story	Also producer
2021	Jungle Cruise	No	Yes	
TBA	Honeymoon with Harry	Yes	No	

=== Executive producer ===
- Storks (2016)
- DC League of Super-Pets (2022)

=== Television ===
Year	Title				
Year	Title	Director	Executive Producer	Writer	Notes
1998	The Wild Thornberrys	No	No	Yes	Episode "Flight of the Donnie"
1998–2000	The Angry Beavers	No	No	Yes	16 episodes
2013	Back in the Game	Yes	Yes	Yes	Co-directed "Pilot", co-wrote "Who's on First"
2015–2018	Patriot	No	Yes	No	
2016–2018	This is Us	Yes	Yes	No	7 episodes
2017	Controversy	Yes	Yes	No	TV movie
2020	neXt	Yes	Yes	No	Co-directed 2 episodes
2022	WeCrashed	Yes	Yes	No	
2023	Rabbit Hole	Yes	Yes	Yes	
2025–2026	Paradise	Yes	Yes	No	Co-directed 6 episodes
