= Rampage (soundtrack) =

Rampage – Original Motion Picture Soundtrack

Film score by Andrew Lockington
- Released: 13 April 2018
- Recorded: February 2018
- Studios: MGM Scoring stage, Culver City, California
- Genre: Film Score
- Length: 73:00
- Label: WaterTower Music

Andrew Lockington chronology
| Meditation Park (2017) | Rampage – Original Motion Picture Soundtrack (2018) | Time Freak (2018) |

Professional ratings
Review scores
| Source | Rating |
|---|---|
| Rate Your Music | 4/5 stars |
| Filmtracks | 2.5/5 stars |
| Movie Wave | 2/5 stars |

Rampage – Original Motion Picture Soundtrack is the film score to the 2018 film of the same name, written and composed by Andrew Lockington. The score was recorded at the MGM Scoring Stage in Culver City, California with the Hollywood Studio Symphony conducted by Nicholas Dodd, together with the African Children's Choir conducted by Jasper Randall. The soundtrack was released digitally on April 13, 2018 by WaterTower Music.

== Background ==
Rampage marks the fourth collaboration between Andrew Lockington and Brad Peyton. The pair had previously worked on Journey 2: The Mysterious Island, San Andreas and Incarnate.

For the basis of the score, Andrew recorded Howler monkeys in Costa Rica and ran them through heavy synthesizers. The African Children's Choir was used in the film's opening space scene, Andrew had recorded them and experimented with "modular synths, remodulators and a unison carrier wave" and the end result altered the choir into something very space-themed.

== Track listing ==
All music is composed by Andrew Lockington except where noted.

| No. | Title | Length |
|---|---|---|
| 1. | "Space" | 4:57 |
| 2. | "Gorillas" | 1:31 |
| 3. | "Paavos" | 1:22 |
| 4. | "Calm" | 3:10 |
| 5. | "Wydens" | 2:14 |
| 6. | "Kate" | 2:15 |
| 7. | "Lab" | 1:09 |
| 8. | "Crispr" | 4:46 |
| 9. | "Wyoming" | 1:21 |
| 10. | "Antennae" | 3:00 |
| 11. | "C17" | 5:50 |
| 12. | "Cornfield" | 3:18 |
| 13. | "Quarry" | 4:52 |
| 14. | "Chicago" | 2:54 |
| 15. | "George" | 3:37 |
| 16. | "Laptop" | 1:18 |
| 17. | "Energyne" | 2:34 |
| 18. | "Team" | 3:44 |
| 19. | "Showdown" | 2:15 |
| 20. | "Grenades" | 1:11 |
| 21. | "Requiem" | 3:04 |
| 22. | "Saved" | 4:05 |
| 23. | "Rampage" | 4:00 |
| 24. | "The Rage" (performed by Kid Cudi) | 4:22 |
| Total length: | | 73:00 |

The film also features track 24, titled "The Rage" performed by Kid Cudi exclusively for the film. The track is played in the end credits of the film. The song was produced by Ben Billions, Dot da Genius & Infamous.

=== Sample credits ===
- "The Rage" contains a sample of "Bullet with Butterfly Wings", written by Billy Corgan, and performed by The Smashing Pumpkins.

== Personnel ==
- Scoring Mixer — Andrew Dudman
- Supervising Music Editor — Joe Bonn
- Technical Scoring Assistant — Neil Parfitt
- Composer Assistant — Jennifer Adler
- Music Preparation — Booker White
- Pro Tools Recordist — Larry Mah
