= Breanne Hill =

American actress and model (born 1990)

- Born: March 10, 1990 (age 36); Salem, New Hampshire, U.S.
- Occupation: Actress
- Years active: 2012–present

Breanne Hill (born March 10, 1990) is an American actress and model. She is best known for her roles as Larissa Abir in San Andreas, Amy in Rampage, and Mary in Frontier.

== Early life and education ==
Formerly known as Breanne Parhiala, she went to North Salem Elementary School and graduated from Salem High School in 2008. Hill attended Boston University before dropping out to become an actress. During her time at the university, she competed for the Terriers' division 1 track & field team.

== Career ==
A frequent collaborator with Brad Peyton, she has a recurring role as Mary in the Discovery Channel and Netflix original production Frontier.

She appeared in the Peyton-directed films Incarnate, San Andreas, and Rampage, the latter two of which star Dwayne Johnson.

== Filmography ==
=== Film ===
Year	Title	Role	Notes
2012	Decision of Faith	Jennie Miller	
2015	San Andreas	Larissa	
2015	Rehearsal	Sapphire	
2016	Incarnate	Ilsa	
2018	Rampage	Amy	
2019	Deadly Assistant	Maya	
2019	Lemon	Crystal	Short film

=== Television ===
Year	Title	Role	Notes
2013	Criminal Minds	Strauss Child #1	Episode: "The Replicator"
2016-2018	Frontier	Mary	Main role; 15 episodes
2019	Christmas Sweethearts	Ashley Seever	Television film
2019	My Best Friend's Christmas	Ashley Seever	Television film
2021	The Nature of Romance	Annette	Television film
