= Rage =

Rage may refer to:

- Rage (emotion), an intense form of anger

== Arts, entertainment, and media ==
=== Fictional characters ===
- Rage (Marvel Comics), a fictional character from Marvel Comics
- Ezekiel Rage, a character from The Real Adventures of Jonny Quest
- Rage (Transformers), a fictional Transformers character
- The Rage, one of the main antagonists of the Red Dwarf novel Last Human by Doug Naylor
- Michael "Rage" Jarman, a supporting character of the Zom-B novel series by Darren Shan

=== Games ===
- Rage (collectible card game), a collectible card game
- Rage (trick-taking card game), a commercial variant of the card game Oh Hell
- Rage (video game), a 2011 first-person shooter and racing video game
  - Rage 2, a 2019 open world first-person shooter and racing video game and a sequel to the first game
- Rage Games, a defunct game developer
- Rockstar Advanced Game Engine, a game engine developed by Rockstar San Diego
- Rage quitting, when players quit a video game for reasons often related to frustration
- R.A.G.E., the engine used to make Combat Assault Vehicle

=== Film and television ===
- Rage (1966 film), starring Glenn Ford and directed by Gilberto Gazcón
- Rage (1972 film), directed by and starring George C. Scott
- Rage!, 1980 made-for-television film directed by William A. Graham and starring David Soul and James Whitmore
- Rage, 1993 action film directed by Anthony Maharaj and starring Richard Norton
- Rage, 1995 action film directed by Joseph Merhi and starring Gary Daniels
- Rage (1997 film), Yugoslav film
- The Rage (1997 film), starring Kristen Cloke and Lorenzo Lamas
- Rage (1999 film), drama written and directed by Newton Aduaka
- The Rage: Carrie 2, 1999 horror film that was the sequel to Carrie
- The Rage (2002 film), Romanian film directed by Radu Muntean
- Rage (2006 film), German film
- The Rage (2007 film), horror film
- The Rage (2008 film), Italian drama film
- Rage (2009 American film), mystery film written starring Jude Law and Judi Dench
- Rage (2009 Spanish film)
- Rage (2014 film), thriller film starring Nicolas Cage
- Rage: Midsummer's Eve, 2015 horror film written and directed by Tii Ricks
- Rage (2016 film), film by Lee Sang-il
- Rage (2025 TV series), Spanish black comedy television series
- "Rage" (Juliet Bravo), a 1980 television episode
- "Rage" (Law & Order: Special Victims Unit), a 2005 television episode
- Rage (Queer as Folk), fictional superhero comic book in Queer as Folk
- Rage (TV program), an Australian music video program
- "Rage," an episode of the cartoon Extreme Ghostbusters
- Rage, a fictional genetically-engineered virus in the film 28 Days Later

=== Literature ===
- Rage (Kessler novel), a 2011 young adult novel by Jackie Morse Kessler
- Rage (King novel), a 1977 novel by Stephen King
- Rage (Smith novel), a 1987 novel by Wilbur Smith
- Rage (Woodward book), a 2020 non-fiction book by Bob Woodward about Donald Trump presidency
- Rage, a 2005 mystery novel by Jonathan Kellerman

=== Music ===
- Rage (music genre), a microgenre of trap music

==== Albums ====
- Rage (T'Pau album), 1988
- The Rage: Original Motion Picture Soundtrack, 2007 by Midnight Syndicate
- Rage (Attila album), 2010
- Rage (Kita Alexander album), 2026

==== Songs ====
- "Rage" (song), by President, 2025
- "The Rage" (song), by Kid Cudi, 2018
- "The Rage", a song by Judas Priest from their 1980 album British Steel
- "Rage", a song by Sander Van Doorn, Firebeatz and Julian Jordan (DJ)
- "The Rage", a song by Kid Cudi from the soundtrack for the 2018 film, Rampage

==== Bands ====
- Rage (English group), an English dance group
- Rage (German band), a German heavy metal band
- Rage, a shorthand form of the American rap rock band Rage Against the Machine

== People ==
- Rage (director), (born 1968), artistic name for American music video director Dale Resteghini
- Al Green (wrestler), stage name Rage, former American professional wrestler Alfred Dobalo (1955–2013)
- Kyle Gass of Tenacious D (born 1960), sometimes known as Rage or Rage-Kage
- The Lady of Rage (born 1968), American rapper
- Rage, guitarist with Venom, real name John Stuart Dixon

== Other uses ==
- RAGE (gene), a gene that in humans encodes the enzyme MAPK/MAK/MRK overlapping kinase
- RAGE (receptor), the biological receptor for advanced glycation endproducts
- Rage (roller coaster), a beyond-vertical-drop roller coaster at Adventure Island
- The Rage (Canada's Wonderland), a swinging ship ride at Canada's Wonderland
- ATI Rage, a series of graphics chipsets by ATI
- Rage comic, also known as FFFFFUUUU-, an Internet meme
- Rage-bait, a media technique of boosting viewer engagement by posting addictive rage-provoking content
- RAGE Coalition, a Philippine political coalition

== See also ==
- Air rage
- Road rage
- Raging (disambiguation)
