= The Rage (song) =

2018 song by Kid Cudi

Song by Kid Cudi

from the album Rampage: Original Motion Picture Soundtrack
- Released: April 12, 2018
- Genre: Hip hop
- Length: 4:22
- Label: WaterTower Music
- Producers: Dot da Genius; Ben Billions; Infamous

"The Rage" is a song by American rapper Kid Cudi, released on April 12, 2018, for the soundtrack to the film Rampage. It samples "Bullet with Butterfly Wings" (1995) by The Smashing Pumpkins. It was Cudi's first release since his 2016 album Passion, Pain & Demon Slayin'.

== Background ==
Cudi checked into rehab in 2016, saying in a Facebook post that he had lived with anxiety and depression for most of his life. He still released Passion, Pain & Demon Slayin' that December and toured behind it in fall 2017. During the Chicago stop of that tour he brought out Kanye West as a surprise guest, and the two performed together again in Los Angeles in early 2018. At the time of the song's release, Cudi was rumored to be working on a collaborative project with West.

== Release ==
Cudi teased the song on the day it came out. It was released a day before Rampage, a monster film directed by Brad Peyton and starring Dwayne Johnson, opened in theaters on April 13. The song plays over the film's end titles and appears on the soundtrack alongside an original score by Andrew Lockington.

== Composition ==
The song is built on a piano and heavy snare drums. Its sample is the chorus of "Bullet with Butterfly Wings", from the Smashing Pumpkins' 1993–1995 era album Mellon Collie and the Infinite Sadness. NME noted that Cudi had worked with alternative acts before, having sampled St. Vincent and collaborated with Haim and Father John Misty.

Lyrically, the song deals with war, fire and struggle. Consequence described Cudi as resilient and hopeful in the face of a major challenge, while XXL said he was powering forward after a long absence from the spotlight.
