= NAACP Image Award for Outstanding Actress in a Television Movie, Mini-Series or Dramatic Special =

American television award

This article lists the winners and nominees for the NAACP Image Award for Outstanding Actress in a Television Movie, Mini-Series or Dramatic Special. Currently, Alfre Woodard holds the record for most wins in this category with six.

== Winners and nominees ==
Winners are listed first and highlighted in bold.

=== 1970s ===
Year	Actress	Movie / Series	Ref
1971
1971	**Elena Verdugo**	**Marcus Welby, M.D.**	
1972 – 79	—N/a		

=== 1980s ===
Year	Actress	Movie / Series	Ref
1980 – 81	—N/a		
1982
1982	**Irene Cara**	**Sister, Sister**	
1983 – 87	—N/a		
1988
1988	**Cicely Tyson**	**Samaritan: The Mitch Snyder Story**	
1989
1989	**Alfre Woodard**	**Unnatural Causes**	

=== 1990s ===
Year	Actress	Movie / Series	Ref
1990
1990	**Alfre Woodard**	**Mandela**	
1991	—N/a		
1992
1992	**Alfre Woodard**	**A Mother's Courage: The Mary Thomas Story**	
1993
1993	**Lynn Whitfield**	**The Josephine Baker Story**	
1994
1994	**Lynn Whitfield**	**I'll Fly Away**	
1995
1995	**Halle Berry**	**Alex Haley's Queen**	
1996
1996	**Alfre Woodard**	**The Piano Lesson**	
1996	Halle Berry	Solomon & Sheba	
1996	C. C. H. Pounder	Zooman	
1996	Regina Taylor	Children of the Dust	
1996	Vanessa Williams	Bye Bye Birdie	
1997
1997	**Cicely Tyson**	**The Road to Galveston**	
1997	Vanessa Bell Calloway	America's Dream	
1997	Ruby Dee	Captive Heart: The James Mink Story	
1997	Jasmine Guy	America's Dream	
1997	Jada Pinkett Smith	If These Walls Could Talk	
1998
1998	**Alfre Woodard**	**Miss Evers' Boys**	
1998	Brandy	Cinderella	
1998	Whoopi Goldberg	Cinderella	
1998	Lonette McKee	To Dance with Olivia	
1998	Vanessa Williams	The Odyssey	
1999
1999	**Cicely Tyson**	**Mama Flora's Family**	
1999	Vanessa Bell Calloway	The Temptations	
1999	Halle Berry	The Wedding	
1999	Queen Latifah	Mama Flora's Family	
1999	Lynn Whitfield	The Wedding	

=== 2000s ===
Year	Actress	Movie / Series	Ref
2000
2000	**Halle Berry**	**Introducing Dorothy Dandridge**	
2000	Diahann Carroll	Having Our Say: The Delany Sisters' First 100 Years	
2000	Ruby Dee	Having Our Say: The Delany Sisters' First 100 Years	
2000	Cicely Tyson	A Lesson Before Dying	
2000	Lynn Whitfield	Dangerous Evidence: The Lori Jackson Story	
2001
2001	**Natalie Cole**	**Livin' for Love: The Natalie Cole Story**	
2001	Khandi Alexander	The Corner	
2001	Loretta Devine	Freedom Song	
2001	Nia Long	If These Walls Could Talk 2	
2001	Alfre Woodard	Holiday Heart	
2002
2002	**Angela Bassett**	**Ruby's Bucket of Blood**	
2002	Carmen Ejogo	Boycott	
2002	Kimberly Elise	Bojangles	
2002	Pam Grier	3 A.M.	
2002	Phylicia Rashad	The Old Settler	
2003
2003	**Angela Bassett**	**The Rosa Parks Story**	
2003	Gloria Reuben	Little John	
2003	Jackie Richardson	Sins of the Father	
2003	Vanessa Williams	Keep the Faith, Baby	
2003	N'Bushe Wright	Widows	
2004
2004	**Whoopi Goldberg**	**Good Fences**	
2004	Suzzanne Douglas	Sounder	
2004	Vanessa Ferlito	Undefeated	
2004	Mo'Nique	Good Fences	
2005
2005	**Lynn Whitfield**	**Redemption: The Stan Tookie Williams Story**	
2005	Tyra Ferrell	NTSB: The Crash of Flight 323	
2005	Tangi Miller	Phantom Force	
2005	Keke Palmer	The Wool Cap	
2005	Gabrielle Union	Something the Lord Made	
2006
2006	**S. Epatha Merkerson**	**Lackawanna Blues**	
2006	Halle Berry	Their Eyes Were Watching God	
2006	Carmen Ejogo	Lackawanna Blues	
2006	Macy Gray	Lackawanna Blues	
2006	Rosie Perez	Lackawanna Blues	
2007
2007	**Sophie Okonedo**	**Tsunami: The Aftermath**	
2007	Fantasia Barrino	Life Is Not a Fairy Tale	
2007	Loretta Devine	Life Is Not a Fairy Tale	
2007	Patti LaBelle	Why I Wore My Lipstick to My Mastectomy	
2007	Aisha Tyler	For One Night	
2008
2008	**Queen Latifah**	**Life Support**	
2008	S. Epatha Merkerson	Girl, Positive	
2008	Sydney Tamiia Poitier	The List	
2008	Holly Robinson Peete	Matters of Life and Dating	
2008	Anika Noni Rose	The Starter Wife	
2009
2009	**Phylicia Rashad**	**A Raisin in the Sun**	
2009	Sanaa Lathan	A Raisin in the Sun	
2009	Audra McDonald	A Raisin in the Sun	
2009	Vanessa Estelle Williams	Flirting with 40	
2009	Chandra Wilson	Accidental Friendship	

=== 2010s ===
Year	Actress	Movie / Series	Ref
2010
2010	**Kimberly Elise**	**Gifted Hands: The Ben Carson Story**	
2010	Ruby Dee	America	
2010	Aunjanue Ellis	Gifted Hands: The Ben Carson Story	
2010	Rosie O'Donnell	America	
2010	Cicely Tyson	Relative Stranger	
2011
2011	**Jill Scott**	**Sins of the Mother**	
2011	Lucy Liu	Marry Me	
2011	Tamera Mowry	Double Wedding	
2011	Tia Mowry	Double Wedding	
2011	Rosie Perez	Lies in Plain Sight	
2012
2012	**Taraji P. Henson**	**Taken from Me: The Tiffany Rubin Story**	
2012	Rosario Dawson	Five	
2012	Tracee Ellis Ross	Five	
2012	Jenifer Lewis	Five	
2012	Anika Noni Rose	Have a Little Faith	
2013
2013	**Alfre Woodard**	**Steel Magnolias**	
2013	Queen Latifah	Steel Magnolias	
2013	Keke Palmer	Abducted: The Carlina White Story	
2013	Phylicia Rashad	Steel Magnolias	
2013	Jill Scott	Steel Magnolias	
2014
2014	**Gabrielle Union**	**Being Mary Jane**	
2014	Angela Bassett	American Horror Story: Coven	
2014	Angela Bassett	Betty & Coretta	
2014	Keke Palmer	CrazySexyCool: The TLC Story	
2014	Gabourey Sidibe	American Horror Story: Coven	
2015
2015	**Cicely Tyson**	**The Trip to Bountiful**	
2015	Angela Bassett	American Horror Story: Freak Show	
2015	Regina King	The Gabby Douglas Story	
2015	Keke Palmer	The Trip to Bountiful	
2015	Vanessa Williams	The Trip to Bountiful	
2016
2016	**Queen Latifah**	**Bessie**	
2016	Angela Bassett	American Horror Story: Hotel	
2016	Aunjanue Ellis	The Book of Negroes	
2016	LaTanya Richardson Jackson	Show Me a Hero	
2016	Jill Scott	With This Ring	
2017
2017	**Regina King**	**American Crime**	
2017	Emayatzy Corinealdi	Roots	
2017	Audra McDonald	Lady Day at Emerson's Bar and Grill	
2017	Anika Noni Rose	Roots	
2017	Kerry Washington	Confirmation	
2018
2018	**Queen Latifah**	**Flint**	
2018	Regina King	American Crime	
2018	Sanna Lathan	Shots Fired	
2018	Jill Scott	Flint	
2018	Oprah Winfrey	The Immortal Life it Henrietta Lacks	
2019
2019	**Regina King**	**Seven Seconds**	
2019	Anna Deavere Smith	Notes from the Field	
2019	Gabrielle Dennis	The Bobby Brown Story	
2019	Jeanté Godlock	The Simone Biles Story: Courage to Soar	
2019	Toni Braxton	Faith Under Fire: The Antoinette Tuff Story	

=== 2020s ===
Year	Actress	Movie / Series	Ref
2020
2020	**Neicy Nash**	**When They See Us**	
2020	Aunjanue Ellis	When They See Us	
2020	Octavia Spencer	Truth Be Told	
2020	Gabrielle Union	Being Mary Jane	
2020	Kerry Washington	American Son	
2021
2021	**Octavia Spencer**	**Self Made: Inspired by the Life of Madam C.J. Walker**	
2021	Michaela Coel	I May Destroy You	
2021	Aunjanue Ellis	The Clark Sisters: First Ladies of Gospel	
2021	Tessa Thompson	Sylvie's Love	
2021	Kerry Washington	Little Fires Everywhere	
2022
2022	**Taraji P. Henson**	**Annie Live!**	
2022	Danielle Brooks	Robin Roberts Presents: Mahalia	
2022	Cynthia Erivo	Genius: Aretha	
2022	Betty Gabriel	Clickbait	
2022	Jodie Turner-Smith	Anne Boleyn	
2023
2023	**Niecy Nash**	**Dahmer – Monster: The Jeffrey Dahmer Story**	
2023	Viola Davis	The First Lady	
2023	Regina Hall	The Best Man: The Final Chapters	
2023	Sanaa Lathan	The Best Man: The Final Chapters	
2023	Zoe Saldaña	From Scratch	
2024
2024	**Chlöe Bailey**	**Praise This**	
2024	Ali Wong	Beef	
2024	Dominique Fishback	Swarm	
2024	Gabrielle Union	The Perfect Find	
2024	Meagan Good	Buying Back My Daughter	
2025
2025	**Naturi Naughton**	**Abducted at an HBCU: A Black Girl Missing Movie**	
2025	Aunjanue Ellis-Taylor	The Supremes at Earl's All-You-Can-Eat	
2025	Sanaa Lathan	The Supremes at Earl's All-You-Can-Eat	
2025	Sofía Vergara	Griselda	
2025	Uzo Aduba	The Supremes at Earl's All-You-Can-Eat	
2026
2026	**Taraji P. Henson**	**Straw**	
2026	Brandy Norwood	Christmas Everyday!	
2026	Dominique Thorne	Ironheart	
2026	Serayah	Ruth & Boaz	
2026	Viola Davis	G20	

== Multiple wins and nominations ==
=== Wins ===
6 wins

- Alfre Woodard

4 wins

- Cicely Tyson

3 wins

- Taraji P. Henson
- Queen Latifah
- Lynn Whitfield

2 wins

- Angela Bassett
- Halle Berry
- Niecy Nash
- Regina King

=== Nominations ===
7 nominations

- Alfre Woodard

6 nominations

- Angela Bassett
- Cicely Tyson

5 nominations

- Halle Berry
- Aunjanue Ellis
- Lynn Whitfield

4 nominations

- Regina King
- Queen Latifah
- Keke Palmer
- Jill Scott
- Vanessa Williams

3 nominations

- Ruby Dee
- Taraji P. Henson
- Sanaa Lathan
- Phylicia Rashad
- Anika Noni Rose
- Gabrielle Union
- Kerry Washington

2 nominations

- Vanessa Bell Calloway
- Viola Davis
- Loretta Devine
- Carmen Ejogo
- Kimberly Elise
- Whoopi Goldberg
- Audra McDonald
- S. Epatha Merkerson
- Brandy Norwood
- Rosie Perez
- Octavia Spencer
