= Frontier (2016 TV series) =

Canadian Western drama television series

- Genre: Historical drama; Action-adventure; Western
- Created by: Rob Blackie; Peter Blackie
- Starring: Jason Momoa; Greg Bryk; Kyle M. Hamilton; Alun Armstrong; Landon Liboiron; Zoe Boyle; Jessica Matten; Christian McKay; Evan Jonigkeit; Shawn Doyle
- Composer: Andrew Lockington
- Country of origin: Canada
- Original languages: English; Cree
- No. of seasons: 3
- No. of episodes: 18

Production
- Executive producers: Brad Peyton; Jeff Fierson; Alex Patrick; John Vatcher; Jason Momoa; Edwina Follows; Perry Chafe; Allan Hawco; Michaell Levine; Rob Blackie; Peter Blackie
- Producer: John Vatcher
- Production locations: Newfoundland and Labrador, Canada; Nova Scotia, Canada; Ontario, Canada; Cornwall, United Kingdom
- Editor: James Patrick
- Production companies: Take the Shot Productions; Factory Backwards; 20th Century Fox and Dream Waves

Original release
- Network: Discovery Channel (Canada); Netflix (international)
- Release: November 6, 2016 – December 21, 2018

Frontier is a Canadian historical drama television series co-created by Rob Blackie and Peter Blackie, chronicling the North American fur trade in colonial Canada in the late 18th century. The series is co-produced by Discovery Canada, as the channel's first original scripted commission, and Netflix. The series premiered on November 6, 2016.

The series was renewed for a second season in October 2016, ahead of its premiere, which premiered on October 18, 2017. Frontier was renewed for a third season on September 20, 2017, also ahead of the previous second season. The entirety of the third season premiered first on Netflix on November 23, 2018, and was broadcast in Canada between December 7 and 21, 2018.

== Synopsis ==
The series chronicles the North American fur trade in late 18th century Canada, and follows Declan Harp (Jason Momoa), a half-Irish, half-Cree outlaw who is campaigning to breach the Hudson's Bay Company's monopoly on the fur trade in his native land, which has become corrupt and engages in illegal activities to enrich itself.

== Cast and characters ==
=== Main ===
- Jason Momoa as Declan Harp, a ruthless trapper, infamous for his brutality, wanted by the Hudson's Bay Company
- Alun Armstrong as Lord Benton, member of the Hudson's Bay Company also known for his iron-fisted tactics.
- Landon Liboiron as Michael Smyth, a tumultuous thief who, after sneaking aboard a Hudson's Bay Company ship, is recruited by the company to spy on Declan Harp.
- Zoe Boyle as Grace Emberly, an ambitious bartender in Fort James who collects and peddles information.
- Jessica Matten as Sokanon
- Christian McKay as Father James Coffin (season 1), a lustful missionary who purports to be a priest; offers himself as a "guide" to Michael.
- Evan Jonigkeit as Captain/Governor Jonathan Chesterfield (season 1–2), Lord Benton's second-in-command.
- Shawn Doyle as Samuel Grant, head of Low River Company
- Greg Bryk as Cobbs Pond
- Zahn McClarnon as Samoset (seasons 1–2)
- Lyla Porter-Follows as Clenna Dolan
- Diana Bentley as Imogen
- Breanne Hill as Mary
- Paul Fauteux as Jean-Marc Rivard
- William Belleau as Dimanche (season 1)
- Allan Hawco as Douglas Brown
- Michael Patric as Malcolm Brown
- Stephen Lord as Cedric Brown (season 1), a Scott who captures the son of the Lake Walkers tribe's chief
- Katie McGrath as Elizabeth Carruthers (season 1–2)
- Charles Aitken as Captain Johnson (season 1)
- Tantoo Cardinal as Kamenna
- Raoul Trujillo as Machk (season 1)
- Kiowa Gordon as Kitchi (season 1)
- Cameron Roberts as Chogan (season 1)
- Jean-Michel Le Gal as Commander Everton (season 2, recurring season 1)
- Demetrius Grosse as Charleston 'Charlie' (season 2–3)
- Karen LeBlanc as Josephette (season 2–3)
- Joel Thomas Hynes as Darragh (season 2)
- David Schaal as Captain Grey (season 2)
- Rémy Girard as Marquis de Beaumont (season 2)
- Jamie Sives as Magnus McTaggart (season 2–3)
- Natar Ungalaaq as Inuk hunter (season 2)
- Nagliniq Amagoalik as Inuk child (season 2)
- James Preston Rogers as Vladimir 'The Siberian' Tetukin (season 2)
- Brendt Thomas Diabo as Aki (season 2)
- Kathryn Wilder as Chaulk (season 2–3)
- Paul Ewan Wilson as Vanstone (season 3, recurring season 1–2)
- Paul McGillion as Major Vinnicombe (season 3)
- Jay Simpson as Lord Winston Fisher (season 3)
- Ellyn Jade as Kahwihta (season 3)
- Michael Raymond-James as Fortunato (season 3)
- Temuera Morrison as Te Rangi (season 3)
- Gary Lewis as Edward Emberly (season 3)
- Gordon Brown as Barclay (season 3)
- Cal MacAninch as Angus (season 3)
- Stephen Oates as Patrick O'Reilly (season 3)
- Evan Mercer as Mercer (season 3)

=== Recurring ===
- Sean Wei Mah as Omaciw
- Graham Abbey as MacLaughlan (season 1)
- A.C. Peterson as Governor Threadwell (season 1)
- Peter O'Meara as Peter Carruthers (season 1)
- Nathaniel Arcand as Wahush (season 2)
- Star Slade as Minno (season 2)
- Ryan Tarran as Wadlow (season 3)

== Episodes ==
=== Series overview ===
Season	Episodes	Originally released	
Season	Episodes	First released	Last released
1	6	November 6, 2016	December 11, 2016
2	6	October 18, 2017	November 22, 2017
3	6	December 7, 2018	December 21, 2018

=== Season 1 (2016) ===
No. overall	No. in season	Title	Directed by	Written by	Original Can. air date
1	1	"A Kingdom Unto Itself"	Brad Peyton	Rob Blackie, Peter Blackie, Perry Chafe	November 6, 2016
Bent on restoring the Hudson's Bay Company's fur trade stranglehold, Lord Benton voyages to the New World to stamp out cutthroat trapper Declan Harp.
2	2	"Little Brother War"	Brad Peyton	Perry Chafe	November 13, 2016
While Emberly schemes with Captain Chesterfield behind Lord Benton's back, Harp makes a dangerous raid to secure an alliance with the Cree.
3	3	"Mushkegowuk Esquewu"	John Vatcher	Rob Blackie & Peter Blackie & Joseph Kay	November 20, 2016
Harp scrambles to make peace after Lord Benton's intrigues stir up deadly trouble among the independent trading outfits and the Cree.
4	4	"Wolves"	Kelly Makin	Greg Nelson	November 27, 2016
A Hudson's Bay Company ship arrives from London with a surprise passenger and troubling news for Lord Benton, who lays a snare for Michael and Harp.
5	5	"The Disciple"	Ken Girotti	Greg Nelson	December 4, 2016
Declan, having been captured, is tortured by Lord Benton. With the help of Emberly, Michael and Sokanon hide from the soldiers searching for them. In an attempt to find Michael, Chesterfield drags Clenna to the Ale House where Grace Emberly rescues her and reunites her with Micheal. In Montreal the Brown brothers are arrested for defaulting on their loan to Samuel Grant. Elizabeth Carruthers offers them a deal; give her their company, one of them must marry her, and she will pay their debts. They agree, however only Malcolm is released as Douglas is charged with the murder of Peter Carruthers. While trying to get away Michael is captured and taken to where Declan is being tortured. Sokanon and Clenna rescue them and in their escape Michael kills Captain Johnson. With Johnson dead, Chesterfield's men retake possession of the governor's house and imprison all of Johnson's soldiers. Declan is taken away severely injured.
6	6	"The Gallows"	Ken Girotti	Greg Spottiswood	December 11, 2016
Declan is badly hurt. He returns to the Alehouse seeking Grace Emberly's help. Declan wants revenge on Benton. Emberly tells Chesterfield now is the time to arrest Benton and become Governor. Everton asks Benton for more food for his imprisoned soldiers but Benton refuses. Everton receives 50 lashes in the yard. Samuel Grant visits Fort James and meets with Emberly. He also visits Benton. Michael, Clenna and Sokanon try to make it back to Fort James to stop Declan but Clenna breaks her leg. Malcolm Brown waits for Chesterfield in the Alehouse. Emberly de-escalates a confrontation between them. Chesterfield proposes to Emberly and she refuses. Michael, Clenna, and Sokanon make to the Alehouse and the girls from the Alehouse set Clenna's leg. Declan meets with Samuel Grant. Declan agrees for Samuel Grant to do business with the Black Wolf Company, on the condition that Grace Emberly has safe passage to Montreal and that Samuel takes Benton for a walk the next day. Emberly betrays Chesterfield to Malcolm Brown. Chesterfield and Malcolm fight and Malcolm is badly beaten. Michael goes after Declan. Samuel Grant meets with Benton as promised but informs him that Declan is waiting to attack him. Declan injures Benton but is captured. Clenna and Michael end their relationship. Michael, Sokanon, Emberly and the girls from the Alehouse blow up the magazine while Declan stands on the gallows. Benton aims for Declan but shoots Father Coffin. Michael shoots Benton and Declan escapes.

=== Season 2 (2017) ===
No. overall	No. in season	Title	Directed by	Written by	Original Can. air date
7	1	"Dead Reckoning"	Brad Peyton	Sherry White	October 18, 2017
Harp is found half dead by Jean-Marc Rivard. Rivard sends Harp north as he travels Harp sees visions of Samoset. Micheal and Sokanon continue to steal pelts and sell them in Montreal in an effort to keep the Black Wolf in business. Though Micheal gives some of the money from selling the pelts to Clenna who now works in Elizabeth Carruthers' pelt processing factory in Montreal. Benton is bedridden and belittling Chesterfield, encouraging Emberly and Chesterfield to conspire against Benton. Captain Gray arrives and Chesterfield and his men turn Benton in for his crimes, leading to Captain Gray making Chesterfield the governor and locking Benton up on his ship. Elizabeth Carruthers buys pelts out from under Samuel Grant upsetting him. Grant leaves the head of a merchant in Elizabeth's desk. She enlists Clenna to return it to him in a hat box and steal the Marquis' attention away from Grant by having Clenna dress up and tell him her fancy hat was made by Elizabeth. In retaliation Cobbs Pond kidnaps Clenna and rebreaks and resets her leg. Elizabeth in need of a husband marries Douglas Brown after freeing him from prison. Emberly marries Chesterfield after he agrees to pardon Harp of all his crimes, but he goes back on his word. With a bounty on Harp's head, Fort James fills up with bounty hunters and one of them attacks Rivard.
8	2	"Wanted"	Brett Sullivan	Aubrey Nealon	October 25, 2017
Bounty hunters find Harp in the North. Benton sails to England at the mercy of Everton, but makes a new friend. Michael has a plan to make the Black Wolf more money. Carruthers and Grant vie for the attention of a French Marquis, and Emberly finds herself in danger of losing her independence.
9	3	"The Wolf and the Bear"	John Vatcher	Chris Roberts	November 1, 2017
Harp is hunted by the Siberian. Michael and Sokanon plot a heist against the Hudson Bay Company. Emberly seeks to protect her father's alehouse from Chesterfield.
10	4	"Mutiny"	David Frazee	Adriana Maggs	November 8, 2017
Michael and Sokanon remain at Fort James preparing to execute the plan for the Black Wolf company. En route to England, Benton proves he is still a skilled manipulator and Chesterfield demonstrates that he is an able student of Benton's.
11	5	"Cannonball"	Paul Fox	Kerri MacDonald & Sherry White	November 15, 2017
Emberly reclaims the Alehouse, but even caught with his pants down, Chesterfield does not intend to lighten the pressure. The plan for seizing the pelts becomes more dangerous. Grant's and Elizabeth's sparring turns deadly.
12	6	"Keetom Takooteeoo Maheekun (The Return of the Wolf)"	David Frazee	Peter Blackie & Rob Blackie	November 22, 2017
Michael meets Pond and negotiates the sale of the stolen pelts but Sokanon has reservations, meanwhile Chesterfield is searching for Harp and Grace is in danger. Douglas and Malcolm Brown find a new ally and set their sights on a weakened Grant. Lord Benton is the chess grand-master and is making sinister plans.

=== Season 3 (2018) ===
No. overall	No. in season	Title	Directed by	Written by	Original Can. air date
13	1	"The Low Road"	TJ Scott	Sherry White	December 7, 2018
The HBC raids the Northern Metis Village burning it down and killing all the residents. Declan tries to save a young escaping girl but is unsuccessful. He then kills many redcoats but is stopped by Micheal when he tries to kill a young redcoat boy. Declan attempts to encourage the survivors to join the Black Wolf company and join him in finding Emberly who was kidnapped by Benton. Declan puts Micheal in charge of the Black Wolf company and asks him to go take control of Fort James. Declan travels north to Moose Fort with Charlie and McTaggart. A new HBC man, Major Vinnicombe is sent from London to take control of Fort James. Micheal begs Sokanon to rejoin him, she refuses as she is angry with him for taking Pond's deal after the death of Wasush. Major Vinnicombe meets with Samuel and informs him that the HBC is confiscating all the furs in his warehouse as they came from HBC land and were therefore obtained illegally. Vinnicombe also asks that Samuel turn Micheal over. Samuel goes to Douglas Brown to try and make an alliance but Douglas refuses because Samuel killed Elizabeth. Clenna plans to help Samuel by making Douglas fall in love with her. Emberly and Chaulk escape from Moose Fort.
14	2	"La Fin Du Monde"	TJ Scott	Russ Cochrane	December 7, 2018
Emberly and Chaulk turn the tables on Benton; Michael makes an attempt at forming an alliance.
15	3	"Satanazes"	TJ Scott	Kerri MacDonald	December 14, 2018
Chaulk tells Declan Benton is taking Emberly to Scotland. They commandeer an HBC ship and find the captain is a Portuguese man named Fortunado who agrees to get them to Scotland. Vinnicombe searches for Micheal in Fort James. Imogen tells Vinnicombe about his connections to the Lake Walker Tribe, Sokanon, and Rivard. Malcolm travels with Micheal and Rivard back to the Lake Walker Tribe. Clenna seeks out Douglas to find out if Malcolm made a deal with Micheal behind Pond's back. Fortunado intentionally antagonizes McTaggart. Douglas finds out that Malcolm and Josephette went behind his back and made a deal with Micheal. Benton demands Emberly eat dinner with him and tries to change her opinion of him. Sokanon seeks out O'Reily, with the help of Mary, who is kidnapping native girls and selling them as wives to white men. Vinnicombe finds Micheal with the Lake Walker Tribe and a fight ensues. Micheal shoots Vinnicombe when he pulls a gun on Kamenna. Douglas tells Clenna about the deal his brother made and she relays the information to Pond. Charlie has McTaggart read him a letter sent years ago by his wife who had become ill. Charlie then thanks Declan for freeing him and asks him to end his suffering. Benton and Emberly arrive in Scotland at his family home where she find her father, alive.
16	4	"All For All and None For One"	Lee Rose	Sherry White & Michelle Latimer	December 14, 2018
Declan and his group arrive in Scotland. HBC soldiers arrive looking for Vinnicombe and arrest Malcolm for his death. Declan seeks help from some of McTaggart's old associates, who agree to help them after a drinking competition between Declan and Barclay. Chaulk being left alone in the square is captured by Benton and told that she must help him or Benton will kill Emberly. Emberly learns Benton has released her father from prison to force her write a letter on his behalf blaming Chesterfield for all of Benton's misdeeds. Sokanon confronts Imogen for her part in trafficking native girls to no avail. She then talks to Kaywihta O'Reily's Haudenosaunee wife who tell Sokanon that there are religious men tricking native families into giving them their daughters to improve trade relations but are really turning them into "country wives" for white men. O'Reily helps Micheal free Malcolm from the HBC and when leaving Fort James is confronted by Sokanon. Kaywihta distracts Sokanon and O'Reily knocks her unconscious kidnapping her. Clenna and Douglas become closer sharing a kiss.
17	5	"House of the Lord"	John Vatcher	Christopher Roberts	December 21, 2018
Lord Benton leverages Grace in his cause with the Hudson's Bay Company. Harp discovers a betrayal. Sokanon faces a perverse imprisonment.
18	6	"The Sins of the Father"	John Vatcher	Rob Blackie & Peter Blackie	December 21, 2018
While the new alliance teeters on collapse Sokanon's crusade leads to bloodshed. Harp invades Lord Benton's castle and faces a dark temptation.

== Production ==
The series is co-produced by Discovery Canada, as the channel's first original scripted commission, and Netflix. Filming for Frontier took place in several locations in Newfoundland and Labrador, Nova Scotia, and Ontario, Canada, as well as Cornwall and Northumberland in the United Kingdom.

== Release ==
The series is produced in 4K ultra high definition; on January 8, 2016, Bell Media confirmed that Frontier would stream in 4K via the Discovery Go app exclusively on Samsung 4K smart TVs.

The series premiered on November 6, 2016. The series was renewed for a second season in October 2016, ahead of its premiere, which premiered on October 18, 2017. Frontier was renewed for a third season on September 20, 2017, also ahead of the previous season. The entirety of the third season premiered first on Netflix on November 23, 2018, and was broadcast in Canada between December 7 and 21, 2018.

Internationally, the series is distributed by Netflix, with the first season available from January 20, 2017. An exclusivity agreement meant that the series would not be available on Netflix in Canada until 2017.

== Reception ==
The first season received mixed reviews. On Rotten Tomatoes it has an approval rating from critics of 43% based on 14 reviews, with the site's consensus reading "Jason Momoa's powerhouse performance as Declan Harp is ultimately weighed down by Frontier's often sluggish storytelling". Metacritic gave the series a weighted average score of 52 out of 100, based on reviews from 11 critics, indicating "mixed or average reviews".

In a positive review, John Doyle of The Globe and Mail described the series as "an action-packed, uncomplicated and very entertaining yarn about the cutthroats who created this country by plundering it, when they weren't busy killing each other". Doyle felt the opening episode's handling of interactions with First Nations was handled "delicately," commenting that Frontier was "far from being a whitewashed tale about the English, Scots, Irish and French battling out for possession of fur and land".

The second season was better received and has a 100% critic rating on Rotten Tomatoes based on 5 reviews.

== Awards and nominations ==
=== Canadian Screen Awards ===
Year	Category	Nominee	Result	Ref
2017	Best Achievement in Casting	Denise Chamain, Sara Kay, Jenny Lewis, Danielle Irvine	Nominated	
2017	Best Direction in a Dramatic Series	Brad Peyton	Nominated	
2017	Best Achievement in Make-Up	Elizabeth Kuchurean	Won	
2017	Best Costume Design	Michael Ground	Nominated	
2017	Best Performance by an Actor in a Continuing Leading Dramatic Role	Jason Momoa	Nominated	
2017	Best Performance by an Actor in a Continuing Leading Dramatic Role	Landon Liboiron	Nominated	
2017	Best Production Design or Art Direction in a Fiction Program or Series	Gordon Barnes	Nominated	
2018	Best Achievement in Make-Up	Elizabeth Kuchurean, Norma Richard	Nominated	
2018	Best Costume Design	Michael Ground	Nominated	
2018	Best Photography, Drama	Glen Keenan	Nominated	
2018	Best Production Design or Art Direction, Fiction	Gord Barnes	Nominated	
2018	Best Sound, Fiction	Marco Dolle, David Yonson, John Elliot, Clive Turner, Alastair Gray, Orest Sushko, Janice Ierulli, Dave Johnson, Mark Shnuriwsky	Nominated	

=== Directors Guild of Canada Awards ===
Year	Category	Nominee	Result	Ref
2017	Best Production Design - Television Series	Gordon Barnes (Episode 101 – A Kingdom Unto Itself)	Nominated	
2017	Best Sound Editing - Television Series	Matthew Hussey, Alastair Gray, Mark Shnuriwsky, Clive Turner (Episode 104, Wolves)	Nominated	
2018	Outstanding Directorial Achievement in Dramatic Series	John Vatcher (Episode 203, The Wolf and the Bear)	Nominated	
