= Seeking Sorrel Wood =

- Film poster
- Directed by: Piia Wirsu
- Written by: Piia Wirsu
- Produced by: Isabella Baldwin
- Starring: Arabella Morton; Lucan Smout; Nick Winters; Sean Brandtman; Jacqui Jones
- Cinematography: Kevin Holloway
- Edited by: Dylan Duclos
- Music by: Charlotte Rebecca Hoffman
- Release date: June 2, 2013 (Australia)
- Running time: 90 minutes
- Country: Australia
- Language: English

Seeking Sorrel Wood is a 2013 Australian fantasy film, written and directed by Piia Wirsu. It stars Arabella Morton, Lucan Smout, Nick Winters, Sean Brandtman and Jacqui Jones.

== Cast ==
- Arabella Morton as Abby
- Lucan Smout as Charlie
- Nick Winters as Murgor
- Sean Brandtman as Father
- Jacqui Jones as Alice

== Release ==
The film had its world premiere on 2 June 2013.
