= Aron Eli Coleite =

American writer

- Born: United States
- Occupations: Comic book writer, screenwriter, television producer
- Writing career
- Notable works: Daybreak, Heroes, The River, Ultimate X-Men, Star Trek: Discovery

Aron Eli Coleite (sometimes credited Aron Coleite) is an American comic book writer, television writer and producer best known for his work on the Netflix series Daybreak, the NBC series Heroes and on the comic book series Ultimate X-Men.

== Career ==
=== Television work ===
Coleite got his start in television serving as a co-producer on the first season of Heroes from 2006-07. He continued to work on the show through to the conclusion of its fourth and final season, eventually being promoted to co-executive producer. During this time he was credited with writing ten episodes. In 2012 he served as a writer and co-executive producer on the Steven Spielberg produced mockumentary thriller series The River at ABC. He wrote two episodes, including co-writing the series finale with Zack Estrin and Michael Green.

In 2012, Coleite had a pilot called Trooper set up at TNT, which starred Mira Sorvino as an unconventional state trooper and was executive produced by Jerry Bruckheimer. However, TNT passed on the pilot in early 2013.

In June 2016, it was announced that Coleite had joined the writing staff for Star Trek: Discovery.

In July 2018, it was announced that Coleite was credited as an executive producer, showrunner, writer and co-creator of the Netflix post-apocalyptic comedy series, Daybreak. The series premiered on October 24, 2019. He also developed, executive produced and wrote for Netflix's Locke & Key and Roku's The Spiderwick Chronicles.

=== Film work ===
Coleite performed rewrites on the Netflix science fiction film Atlas. Other screenplays Coleite had in development included an apocalyptic drama entitled The End, at Warner Bros. Studios and to be directed by Drew Barrymore. The second was an adaptation of a short story by Rick Yancey entitled When First We Were Gods, set in a world where immortality can be bought by the rich and follows a man who attempts to murder his immortal wife so that his mortal mistress can take her place and live forever.

=== Ultimate X-Men ===
In 2008-09, Coleite served as the writer on the comic book series Ultimate X-Men, writing three story arcs: Absolute Power, Ultimatum and Ultimatum: X-Men Requiem.
