= Daybreak (2019 TV series) =

American post-apocalyptic comedy drama adventure television series

- Promotional poster
- Genre: Post-apocalyptic; Black comedy; Teen drama; Adventure
- Created by: Brad Peyton; Aron Eli Coleite
- Based on: 'Daybreak' by Brian Ralph
- Starring: Colin Ford; Alyvia Alyn Lind; Sophie Simnett; Austin Crute; Cody Kearsley; Jeanté Godlock; Gregory Kasyan; Krysta Rodriguez; Matthew Broderick
- Composer: Andrew Lockington
- Country of origin: United States
- Original language: English
- No. of seasons: 1
- No. of episodes: 10

Production
- Executive producers: Brad Peyton; Aron Eli Coleite; Jeff Fierson
- Producers: Michael J. Malone; Bruce Dunn
- Cinematography: Duane Manwiller; Jaron Presant
- Editors: Rachel Goodlett Katz; Tirsa Hackshaw; Amber Bansak
- Camera setup: Single-camera
- Running time: 38–50 minutes
- Production companies: ASAP Entertainment; Lightbulb Farm

Original release
- Network: Netflix
- Release: October 24, 2019

Daybreak is an American post-apocalyptic comedy drama television series created by Brad Peyton and Aron Eli Coleite, very loosely based on the comic series by Brian Ralph. It premiered on October 24, 2019, on Netflix and stars Colin Ford, Alyvia Alyn Lind, Sophie Simnett, Austin Crute, Cody Kearsley, Jeanté Godlock, Gregory Kasyan, Krysta Rodriguez, and Matthew Broderick.

In December 2019, Netflix canceled the series after one season.

== Synopsis ==
The series follows the story of 17-year-old Canadian high school outcast Josh Wheeler, who is searching for his missing British girlfriend Sam Dean in post-apocalyptic Glendale, California. He is joined by a ragtag group of misfits, including 10-year-old pyromaniac Angelica and Josh's former high school bully Wesley, who is now a pacifist would-be samurai. Josh tries to survive among the hordes of Mad Max-style gangs (evil jocks, cheerleaders turned Amazonian warriors, etc), people who have turned into zombie-like creatures called Ghoulies, and the mysterious Baron Triumph.

The leader of the jocks, Turbo, doesn't make things better; his terrible leadership and sadism threatens the remaining survivors.

== Cast ==
=== Main ===
- Colin Ford as Josh Wheeler, a recent transfer student searching for his girlfriend in the apocalypse. He is fourth wall aware, and not narrating out of craziness.
- Alyvia Alyn Lind as Angelica Green, a 10-year-old pyromaniac. She is a child genius who is somewhat psychopathic.
- Sophie Simnett as Samaira "Sam" Dean, a popular student and Josh's girlfriend
- Austin Crute as Wesley Fists, a self-styled rōnin seeking redemption for his past mistakes
- Cody Kearsley as Turbo "Bro Jock" Pokaski, former quarterback and the unhinged leader of the Jocks. His throat suffered damage during Armageddon, so Turbo can't speak well.
- Jeanté Godlock as Mona Lisa, a Jock and Turbo's second-in-command
- Gregory Kasyan as Eli Cardashyan, a resilient and self-serving Armenian American survivor who occupies the Glendale Mall
- Krysta Rodriguez as Ms. Crumble, Glendale High's former biology teacher. She has severe head trauma caused during the onset of the apocalypse, which causes her to act irrationally and is initially mistaken for a Ghoulie.
- Matthew Broderick as Michael Francis Xavier Burr, Glendale High's principal. In Josh's flashbacks, Burr goes on nonsensical ramblings before getting to the point.

=== Recurring ===
==== The Jocks ====
- Chester Rushing as Terrence "Terry" Markazian, captain of the golf team
- Micah McNeil as Jerry
- Alan Trong as Larry
- Mickey Dolan as Gary Stern
- Jon Levert as Barry
- Luke Valen as #54

==== The Daybreakers ====
- A.J. Voliton as Fred
- Abigail Townsend as Vivienne
- Chelsea Zhang as Karen Jane "KJ", a polyglot and Josh's ally
- Estrella Avila as Jessica Huntley
- Kevin Bransford as Other Gay Josh
- Jack Justice as Jew-Fro Simon
- Bao Winn as Rocco

==== The Cheermazons ====
- Jade Payton as Demi Anderson, one of the three leaders of the Cheermazons
- Sandra Mae Frank as Victoria, one of the three leaders of the Cheermazons
- Emily Snell as Miryam, one of the three leaders of the Cheermazons
- Charlotte Benesch as Camilla, a Brazilian exchange student
- Barbie Robertson as Veronica, Victoria's closest friend and interpreter

==== Other survivors ====
- Sammi Hanratty as Aria Killigan: the reclusive leader of the Gamers, and ally of KJ
- Rob H. Roy as Jaden Hoyles
- Erik Christensen as Jaden Thompson Magee
- Gabriel Armijo as Jaden Unger
- Austin Maas as Bro Jock
- Zoe Biggers as Jaden Florentina
- Andrew Fox as Owen 'Slowen' Krieger
- Natalie Alyn Lind as Mavis
- Mitchell Hoog as Nimrod
- Meg Smith as Isis Goodman
- Jordyn Aurora Aquino as a disciple of Kardashia

== Episodes ==
No.	Title	Directed by	Written by	Original release date
1	"Josh vs. the Apocalypse: Part 1"	Brad Peyton	Aron Eli Coleite & Brad Peyton	October 24, 2019
Josh is thriving in a post-apocalyptic world, as he looks for his girlfriend, Sam. Josh frequently speaks directly to the audience and explains the origin of the apocalypse (biological warfare), the threat of the ghoulies (surviving, zombie-like adults) and the tribalization of the survivors patterned on their high school cliques. After his regular hideout is wrecked by a mutant pug, he inadvertently rescues Angelica from a sadistic golf team. He also meets an old bully, Wesley, who is a self-styled pacifist samurai, as the three team up against Turbo and the Jock tribe. After being tipped off that Sam is at the mall, they make their way there, only to be chased by Baron Triumph, a mysterious survivor known for kidnapping kids and cannibalism. He pulls up and the trio are shocked to see who it is.
2	"Schmuck Bait!"	Brad Peyton	Aron Eli Coleite & Brad Peyton	October 24, 2019
Josh, Angelica and Wesley discover that 'Baron Triumph' is an impostor named Eli, who uses the disguise to scare away other survivors from the Glendale Mall. Rather than join a tribe, Eli laid claim to the mall soon after the bombs fell and rigged it with a mix of lethal and non-lethal traps to keep out intruders. Eli double-crosses Josh and Angelica and traps them in a section of the mall where they come across 'The Witch' (Ms. Crumble), one of Josh's teachers. Unlike other ghoulies, she has retained some intelligence and can speak more than a single sentence. A ghoulie enters the mall and attacks Josh, but Eli rescues him and releases Angelica and Wesley to help him defend the mall. The four face the real Baron Triumph in a cargo elevator when Ms. Crumble appears and scares off Triumph. Josh discovers he has been bitten and attempts to amputate his forearm but misses, chopping his finger off by mistake. Angelica shows Josh her own healed wounds, stating that ghoulie bites are not contagious before he passes out.
3	"The Slime Queenpin of Glendale, CA"	Michael Patrick Jann	Calaya Michelle Stallworth	October 24, 2019
With Josh unconscious, Angelica searches for antibiotics and narrates to the audience the flashbacks of her life before the bombs. Identified early as a genius, her parents tried to shelter her from peers through rigorous professional tutoring. Instead, she sought inspiration from various mafia and cartel figures in the drug trade and leveraged her therapist to provide her with ample amounts of prescription narcotics. Angelica then connected with the high schoolers by lacing the drugs into edible slime; however, her plans fall apart when she is eventually caught. Wesley and Angelica find a pharmacy with the necessary medications but struggle to protect it from raiders and ghoulies. Josh remains in the mall under the protection of a hungry Ms. Crumble, who is struggling to control her ghoulie urges. She eventually finds a workaround by using maggots to treat Josh's necrotic tissue and then consuming the maggots. Once Wesley and Angelica break away with the medication, they realize Josh will leave to resume finding Sam; however, they instead deceive him into thinking that she is dead.
4	"MMMMMMM-HMMMMMM"	Michael Patrick Jann	Andy Black	October 24, 2019
Convinced by Angelica and Wesley's deception that Baron Triumph is behind "Sam's death," and is the old school bully Jayden Hoyles, Josh goes after him. After Triumph captures Josh, Wes & Turbo, they discover his lair is the Hoyle family's cereal factory. Triumph divided his prisoners into groups in cages and workers; among the cages, Josh uses his hidden lockpicks from his prosthetic finger but drops one among the workers, who do not speak English. A worker, K.J., seems to understand and helps him get free but breaks the pick in the process. Josh pursues Triumph for the keys and finds Jayden Hoyles tied and ready to be roasted. In shock, Josh turns to see the real Baron Triumph reveal himself as principal Burr, who survived the bombs. He retained his intelligence, and gained cannibalistic hunger like the other ghoulies, but refines his activities by having his workers "fatten up" the children he wants to eat. They fight, until Josh "drowns" Burr in one of the cereal vats; freeing the others, they leave Turbo behind and bring the survivors back to the mall. There, they rejoin Eli, Angelica, and Ms. Crumble to form a new community.
5	"Homecoming Redux or My So Called Stunt Double Life"	Sherwin Shilati	Ira Madison III	October 24, 2019
Wesley's story reveals that he has to choose between his boyfriend Turbo and Josh. We see that Wesley has always loved Turbo, but hates the way he makes him choose between him and hurting his 3rd cousin Emmett in a football game before the apocalypse happened. Turbo says that Wesley has to kill Josh or he kills all. The kids at the mall decide to put on a dance, listening to the music through bluetooth headphones to avoid succumbing the ghoulies. Eli helps Wesley poison the crown that Josh was sure to win due to his heroic actions, however Wesley wins the vote. Buckled by his guilt, he knocks the crown away before the lights go out and Turbo's tribe turn up, ready to kill anyone that crosses them. However Wesley has already warned everyone what Turbo's plans are, so the teens hide and get ready to attack.
6	"5318008"	Sherwin Shilati	Emily Fox	October 24, 2019
Josh and KJ meet the gamers and discover that there is traitor amongst the Jocks who wants to kill Turbo. They ask the gamers for help to kill Turbo, but unfortunately he has one up on them. Angelica & Ms Crumble visit the cereal factory where Principal Burr has been kept prisoner. Due to starting her period, Ms. Crumble tries to attack Angelica, who discovers how to use a tampon with the help of Burr. She opens the door to Ms. Crumble collapsing, where something mysterious has taken over her back. After sleeping with KJ, Josh looks back at the footage from the gamers cams inside the school, where he discovers that Sam is still alive and is held hostage by the Jocks. Back at the mall, where Wesley & Eli are tied up due to their betrayals, Angelica arrives back to be told that Wesley told Josh that they faked Sam's death, leading to Josh banishing the three of them.
7	"Canta Tu Vida"	Mark Tonderai-Hodges	Jenn Kao	October 24, 2019
Ms. Crumble looks for Angelica and reaches the Cheermazon tribe, competing in trials to get into the tribe. Angelica joins the tribe. Ms. Crumble meanwhile drops in and out of reality, thinking she is in her own sitcom. Back at the school, Mona discovers that Turbo set himself up by getting hit by an arrow and blaming it on Gary who was part of the unfortunate golf team, leaving Barry as the only surviving member. Sam, Barry and Mona formulate a plan to get Principal Burr back into power and try and get things "back to normal." At the mall, Eli repeatedly tries to break back into it, with each time Josh kicking him out. The alarms sound, with Josh convinced it is Eli. He goes up on the roof to find a girl, who reveals herself to be Mavis, who was believed to be Eli's girlfriend who is actually a mannequin. Here is where it is discover that Josh broke up with Sam just before the apocalypse happened.
8	"Post Mates"	Kate Herron	Aron Eli Coleite	October 24, 2019
This episode solely concentrates on the day that Sam & Josh broke up (the day the bombs fell). They ditch school to go to Josh's apartment, where they consent to sleep with each other. Josh discovers that Sam is not a virgin like he is. After ordering a lot of food, they go out into the swimming pool where Sam shuts down the fact that Josh thinks she is this "Nice" girl ever since he posted that video of her, which she wished he never did. After, they have sex for the first time. Since arriving at the apartment, Josh's mom has been ringing him repeatedly, texting him to "call his dad." Sam finally answers his phone, passing it to Josh to speak to his mother. Without saying anything, Josh abruptly gets up, leaving Sam in the apartment. She finds him on the sidewalk, where he tells her his father has died. Josh blames Sam for distracting him, calling her a "slut." She storms off back to the school, which is ready for the big football game, before the nuclear bomb hits.
9	"Josh vs. the Apocalypse: Part 2"	Michael Patrick Jann	Story by : Emily Fox & Jenn Kao; Teleplay by : Aron Eli Coleite	October 24, 2019
Sam brings Principal Burr back to the school, who promptly overthrows Turbo in single combat and dumps his body outside the camp. Wesley rescues Turbo and begins to nurse him back to health. During flashbacks, Josh learns to hunt with his father and realizes that he has pushed away everyone he cares about to prevent himself from getting hurt. He then recruits Eli to help him infiltrate the High School dressed as Baron Triumph to rescue Sam; the two bond over shared interests in Pokémon cards, until Eli is fatally attacked by Hoyle, who mistakes him for the Baron. Burr attempts to turn things back to "normal," in the school by resuming regular activities; working with Sam, they discover that the teenagers may have survived due to HPV vaccinations instituted before the explosions. Burr quickly returns to his old ways and poisons the school with sedative slime. Josh resumes the mission dressed as Triumph and successfully enters the school, which is empty except for Sam. As Sam and Josh reunite, Burr detonates one of the unexploded bombs, sending shockwaves throughout Glendale.
10	"FWASH-BOOOOOOOOOOOOOOOOOOOOOOOOOM!"	Michael Patrick Jann	Aron Eli Coleite	October 24, 2019
Burr leads the remaining Jock army to kidnap members of other tribes, including Angelica from the Cheermazons. Due to the shockwave, everyone in the area suffers from hearing loss; Josh, who knows sign language, communicates with the Cheermazon Triumvirate for help. Burr threatens Angelica into helping detonate more ordinance – this time one with a nuclear and biological payload – to eradicate all of Glendale. Josh and Sam rally the tribes, including the Daybreakers, Wesley and Turbo (who reconciled), and Ms. Crumble, convincing them to attack Burr before he can detonate the bomb. Josh lures ghoulies to the bomb site and attack the Jocks, while he and Sam battle Burr and rescue Angelica. They defeat Burr, who states that they ignore "the real threat" that approaches, while a third arm erupts from his body. Josh kills him by exploiting his peanut allergy and dismembering the new appendage. Ms. Crumble defeats the bomb by launching it manually. Josh invites Sam to join him in a "happily ever after" ending, but Sam rebuffs him and declares herself the new leader. Josh, Wesley, Angelica, and some survivors watch in horror as their friends kneel before Sam, who is the threat Burr foretold.

== Production ==
=== Development ===
Peyton started creating a series based on the graphic novel in 2012. He realised that the book had influences from Ferris Bueller. On July 26, 2018, Netflix announced an order for the production of a ten-episode first season. Aron Eli Coleite was set to serve as showrunner for the series. The series is created by Brad Peyton and Coleite who are credited as executive producers alongside Jeff Fierson. ASAP Entertainment will be involved in the production of the series. In September 2019, it was reported that the series was set to premiere on October 24, 2019. On December 16, 2019, Netflix canceled the series after one season.

=== Casting ===
In October 2018, it was announced that Matthew Broderick would star in the series. In the same month, it was reported that Colin Ford, Alyvia Alyn Lind, Sophie Simnett, Austin Crute, Gregory Kasyan, Krysta Rodriguez, Cody Kearsley, and Jeante Godlock joined the cast.

=== Filming ===
Principal photography for the first season took place on location in Albuquerque, New Mexico, from October 2018 to April 2019.

== Release ==
On September 16, 2019, a teaser trailer for the series was released. On October 7, 2019, Netflix released the official trailer for the series.

== Reception ==
The review aggregator website Rotten Tomatoes reported a 70% approval rating for the first season with an average rating of 7.0/10, based on 33 reviews. The website's critical consensus reads, "Daybreak's blend of soapy teen drama and post apocalyptic horror has some truly inspired moments, even if it feels like you've seen a few of them before." On Metacritic, it has a weighted average score of 54 out of 100, based on 10 critics, indicating "mixed or average reviews".
