= Arabella Morton =

Australian actress

- Born: 18 November 2000 (age 25); Ipswich, Queensland, Australia
- Occupations: Actress; model
- Years active: 2010–present
- Height: 5 ft 7 in (1.70 m)

Arabella Morton (born 18 November 2000) is an Australian actress best known for the role of Gael in the 2010 fantasy-adventure film The Chronicles of Narnia: The Voyage of the Dawn Treader, as well as appearances in San Andreas (2015) and Seeking Sorrel Wood (2011).

== Filmography ==
=== Film ===
Year	Title	Role	Notes
2015	San Andreas	Mallory Gaines	
2011	Seeking Sorrel Wood	Abby	
2010	The Chronicles of Narnia: The Voyage of the Dawn Treader	Gael	
