= Raging =

Raging may refer to:

- Raging River, a river in the United States
- "Raging" (song), Kygo song featuring Kodaline

== See also ==
- Rage (disambiguation)
- Griefer
