= Jeanté Godlock =

American actress

- Born: Los Angeles, California, U.S.
- Occupation: Actress
- Years active: 2016–present

Jeanté Godlock is an American actress.

== Life and career ==
Godlock was born in Los Angeles, California, and began her career appearing in short films before was cast as artistic gymnast Simone Biles in the 2018 biographical made-for-television movie The Simone Biles Story: Courage to Soar on Lifetime. At the 50th NAACP Image Awards, Godlock received nomination for Outstanding Actress in a Television Movie, Mini-Series or Dramatic Special. The following year, Godlock starred in the Netflix post-apocalyptic comedy-drama series, Daybreak. The series was canceled after one season. She later guest-starred on 9-1-1: Lone Star and Black-ish. In 2023 she appeared in the Lifetime thriller film, You're Not Supposed to Be Here. She later was cast in the war drama film The Six Triple Eight, directed by Tyler Perry.

== Filmography ==
| Year | Title | Role | Notes |
|---|---|---|---|
| 2016 | Sell Out! | Aisha | Short film |
| 2018 | The Simone Biles Story: Courage to Soar | Simone Biles | Television film Nominated — NAACP Image Award for Outstanding Actress in a Television Movie, Mini-Series or Dramatic Special |
| 2019 | Daybreak | Mona Lisa | Series regular, 10 episodes |
| 2021 | 9-1-1: Lone Star | McKenna | Episode: "Slow Burn" |
| 2021 | Unspoken | Barbara | Short film |
| 2022 | Black-ish | Asia | Episode: "Bow-Mo" |
| 2023 | You're Not Supposed to Be Here | Kaylee | Television film |
| 2024 | The Six Triple Eight | Vera Scott | Nominated — NAACP Image Award for Outstanding Ensemble Cast in a Motion Picture |
