= 50th NAACP Image Awards =

American entertainment awards for 2018 works

- Date: March 30, 2019
- Site: Dolby Theatre, Los Angeles, California
- Hosted by: Anthony Anderson
- Official website: NAACPImageAwards.net

Television coverage
- Network: TV One

The 50th NAACP Image Awards ceremony, presented by the NAACP, honored outstanding representations and achievements of people of color in motion pictures, television, music, and literature during the 2018 calendar year. The ceremony took place on March 30, 2019, at the Dolby Theatre, was hosted by Anthony Anderson and broadcast on TV One.

During the ceremony Jay-Z was awarded with the President's Award for "shedding light on the issues that plague the black community including systematic racism and unjust treatment under the law, utilizing his global platform to create everlasting change", and Maxine Waters was awarded with the Chairman's Award "to be an inspiration and one of the most dominant and influential women in politics, a warrior fighting for women's education and social equality". Beyoncé was recognized for the second time as the Entertainer of the Year, becoming the fourth artist to won it twice, joying Whitney Houston (1994,1995), Patti LaBelle ( 1992, 1987) and Dionne Warwick (1988,1986).

All nominees are listed below, and the winners are listed in bold.

== Special awards ==
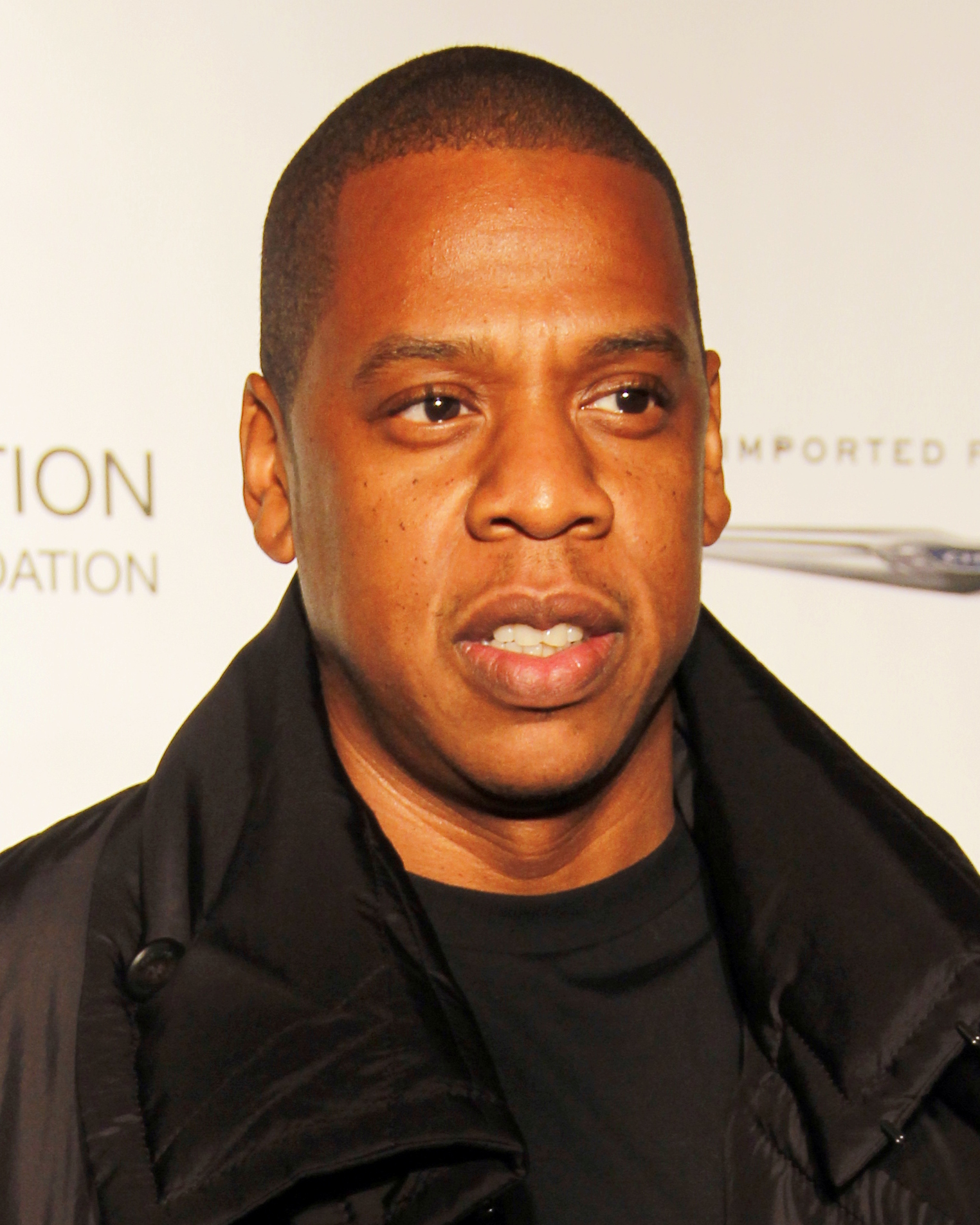
Jay-Z was honored with the President's Award

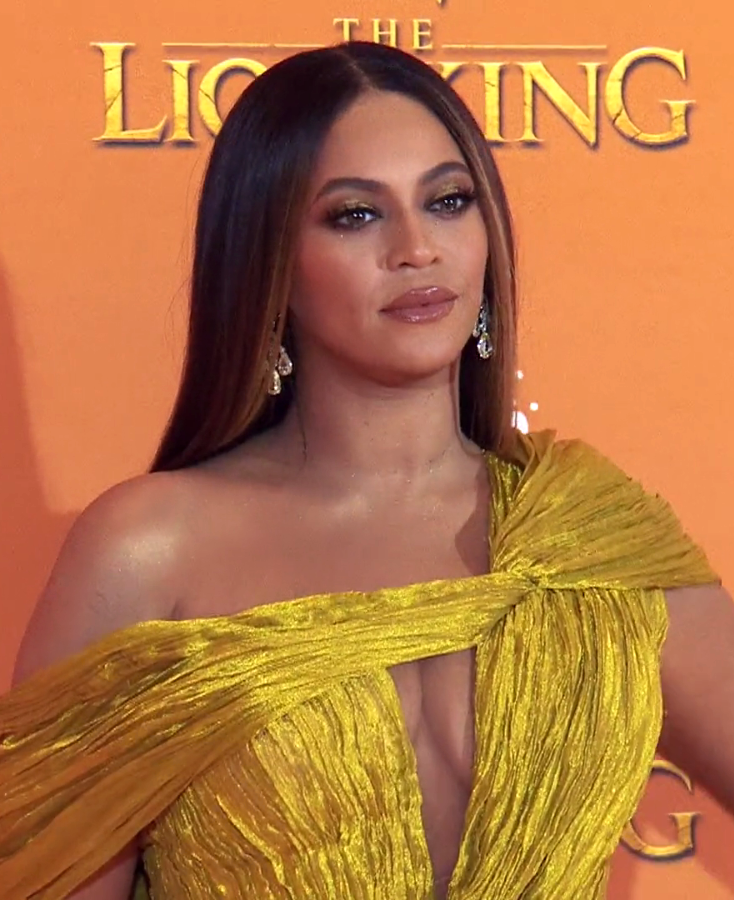
Beyoncé was honored with the Entertainer of the Year Award

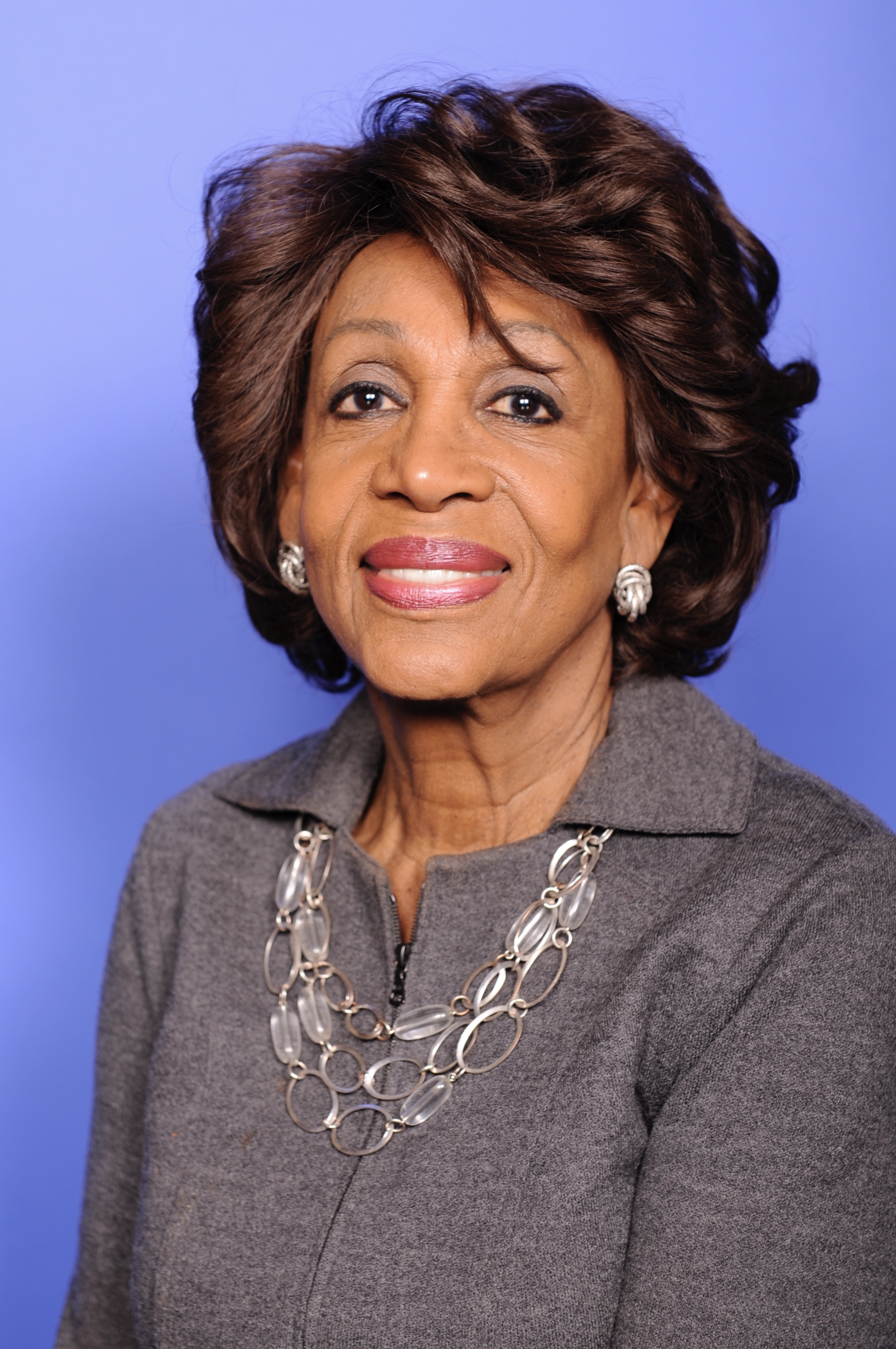
Maxine Waters was honored with the Chairman's Award

President's Award
- **Jay-Z**
Chairman's Award
- **Maxine Waters**
Entertainer of the Year
- **Beyoncé**
- Chadwick Boseman
- LeBron James
- Regina King
- Ryan Coogler

== Motion picture ==
**Outstanding Motion Picture**: **Black Panther**; BlacKkKlansman; Crazy Rich Asians; If Beale Street Could Talk; The Hate U Give	**Outstanding Directing in a Motion Picture**: **Ryan Coogler – Black Panther**; Alan Hicks and Rashida Jones – Quincy; Barry Jenkins – If Beale Street Could Talk; Spike Lee – BlacKkKlansman; Steve McQueen – Widows
**Outstanding Actor in a Motion Picture**: **Chadwick Boseman – Black Panther**; Stephan James – If Beale Street Could Talk; Michael B. Jordan – Creed II; Denzel Washington – The Equalizer 2; John David Washington – BlacKkKlansman	**Outstanding Actress in a Motion Picture**: **Amandla Stenberg – The Hate U Give**; Viola Davis – Widows; Sanaa Lathan – Nappily Ever After; KiKi Layne – If Beale Street Could Talk; Constance Wu – Crazy Rich Asians
**Outstanding Supporting Actor in a Motion Picture**: **Michael B. Jordan – Black Panther**; Mahershala Ali – Green Book; Winston Duke – Black Panther; Brian Tyree Henry – If Beale Street Could Talk; Russell Hornsby – The Hate U Give	**Outstanding Supporting Actress in a Motion Picture**: **Danai Gurira – Black Panther**; Regina Hall – The Hate U Give; Regina King – If Beale Street Could Talk; Lupita Nyong'o – Black Panther; Letitia Wright – Black Panther
**Outstanding Writing in a Motion Picture**: **Ryan Coogler and Joe Robert Cole – Black Panther**; Peter Chiarelli and Adele Lim – Crazy Rich Asians; Barry Jenkins – If Beale Street Could Talk; Boots Riley – Sorry to Bother You; Charlie Wachtel, David Rabinowitz, Kevin Willmott and Spike Lee – BlacKkKlansman	**Outstanding Independent Motion Picture**: **If Beale Street Could Talk**; BlacKkKlansman; Nappily Ever After; Sorry to Bother You; Traffik
**Outstanding Breakthrough Role in a Motion Picture**: **Letitia Wright – Black Panther**; Winston Duke – Black Panther; KiKi Layne – If Beale Street Could Talk; Storm Reid – A Wrinkle in Time; John David Washington – BlacKkKlansman	**Outstanding Ensemble Cast in a Motion Picture**: **Black Panther**; BlacKkKlansman; Crazy Rich Asians; The Hate U Give; Widows

== Television ==
Best Series
Outstanding Drama Series	Outstanding Comedy Series
**Power**; This Is Us; Queen Sugar; The Chi; How to Get Away with Murder	**Black-ish**; Insecure; Grown-ish; Dear White People; Atlanta
Outstanding Television Movie, Limited-Series or Dramatic Special	Outstanding Children's Program
**The Bobby Brown Story**; Behind the Movement; The Simone Biles Story: Courage to Soar; Seven Seconds; Jesus Christ Superstar Live in Concert	**Doc McStuffins**; Top Chef Junior; Sesame Street; Marvel's Avengers: Black Panther's Quest; Motown Magic
Best Acting in a Drama Series
Outstanding Actor in a Drama Series	Outstanding Actress in a Drama Series
**Omari Hardwick – Power**; Jason Mitchell – The Chi; Keith David – Greenleaf; Kofi Siriboe – Queen Sugar; Sterling K. Brown – This Is Us	**Taraji P. Henson – Empire**; Alfre Woodard – Luke Cage; Naturi Naughton – Power; Viola Davis – How to Get Away with Murder; Rutina Wesley – Queen Sugar
Outstanding Supporting Actor in a Drama Series	Outstanding Supporting Actress in a Drama Series
**Jesse Williams – Grey's Anatomy**; Joe Morton – Scandal; Romany Malco – A Million Little Things; Jussie Smollett – Empire; Wendell Pierce – Tom Clancy's Jack Ryan	**Lynn Whitfield – Greenleaf**; CCH Pounder – NCIS: New Orleans; Sanaa Lathan – The Affair; Susan Kelechi Watson – This Is Us; Thandie Newton – Westworld
Best Acting in a Comedy Series
Outstanding Actor in a Comedy Series	Outstanding Actress in a Comedy Series
**Anthony Anderson – Black-ish**; Donald Glover – Atlanta; Cedric the Entertainer – The Neighborhood; Dwayne Johnson – Ballers; Tracy Morgan – The Last O.G.	**Tracee Ellis Ross – Black-ish**; Issa Rae – Insecure; Yara Shahidi – Grown-ish; Logan Browning – Dear White People; Danielle Brooks – Orange Is the New Black
Outstanding Supporting Actor in a Comedy Series	Outstanding Supporting Actress in a Comedy Series
**Marcus Scribner – Black-ish**; Laurence Fishburne – Black-ish; Jay Ellis – Insecure; John David Washington – Ballers; Tituss Burgess – Unbreakable Kimmy Schmidt	**Marsai Martin – Black-ish**; Natasha Rothwell – Insecure; Uzo Aduba – Orange Is the New Black; Yvonne Orji – Insecure; Essence Atkins – Marlon
Best Acting in a Movie/Limited Series
Outstanding Actor in a Television Movie, Limited-Series or Dramatic Special	Outstanding Actress in a Television Movie, Limited-Series or Dramatic Special
**Michael B. Jordan – Fahrenheit 451**; Brandon Victor Dixon – Jesus Christ Superstar Live in Concert; John Legend – Jesus Christ Superstar Live in Concert; Russell Hornsby – Seven Seconds; Woody McClain – The Bobby Brown Story	**Regina King – Seven Seconds**; Anna Deavere Smith – Notes from the Field; Gabrielle Dennis – The Bobby Brown Story; Jeanté Godlock – The Simone Biles Story: Courage to Soar; Toni Braxton – Faith Under Fire: The Antoinette Tuff Story
Outstanding Performance by a Youth (Series, Special, Television Movie or Limited Series)
**Marsai Martin – Black-ish**; Miles Brown – Black-ish; Lyric Ross – This Is Us; Lonnie Chavis – This Is Us; Alex R. Hibbert – The Chi
Best Acting Overall
Outstanding Guest Actor or Actress in a Television Series
**Kerry Washington – How to Get Away with Murder**; Tisha Campbell-Martin – Empire; Loretta Devine – Love Is...; Kendrick Lamar – Power; Erika Alexander – Black Lightning
Reality & Variety
Outstanding Talk Series	Outstanding Reality Program/Reality Competition Series
**The Real**; ESPN's First Take; Red Table Talk; The Daily Show with Trevor Noah; The View	**Iyanla: Fix My Life**; Lip Sync Battle; RuPaul's Drag Race; Shark Tank; The Voice
Outstanding News / Information – (Series or Special)	Outstanding Host in a Talk, Reality, News/ Information or Variety (Series or Special)
**Oprah Winfrey Presents: Becoming Michelle Obama**; AM Joy; Angela Rye's State of the Union; A Thousand Words with Michelle Obama; Unsung	**Jada Pinkett Smith, Adrienne Banfield Norris, Willow Smith – Red Table Talk**; Trevor Noah – The Daily Show with Trevor Noah; Lester Holt – NBC Nightly News with Lester Holt; LeBron James – The Shop; Joy Reid – AM Joy
Outstanding Variety or Game Show – (Series or Special)
**Black Girls Rock! 2018**; 2 Dope Queens; Bruno Mars: 24K Magic Live at the Apollo; Saturday Night Live; Trevor Noah: Son of Patricia

== Recording ==
=== Outstanding New Artist ===
- **Ella Mai**
  - Jade Novah
  - Koryn Hawthorne
  - Omar Wilson
  - Tory Lanez

=== Outstanding Male Artist ===
- **Bruno Mars**
  - MAJOR.
  - John Legend
  - Raheem DeVaughn
  - Childish Gambino

=== Outstanding Female Artist ===
- **H.E.R.**
  - Andra Day
  - Janet Jackson
  - Ella Mai
  - Janelle Monáe

=== Outstanding Duo, Group or Collaboration ===
- **Kendrick Lamar & SZA – "All the Stars"**
  - John Legend feat. BloodPop – "A Good Night"
  - H.E.R. feat. Bryson Tiller – "Could've Been"
  - Bruno Mars feat. Cardi B – "Finesse (Remix)"
  - The Carters – "Everything Is Love"

=== Outstanding Jazz Album ===
- **Jazmin Deborah Ghent – The Story of Jaz**
  - Christian Sands – Facing Dragons
  - Jon Batiste – Hollywood Africans
  - Ben Tankard – Rise!
  - Camille Thurman – Waiting for the Sunrise

=== Outstanding Gospel Album – Traditional or Contemporary ===
- **Koryn Hawthorne – Unstoppable**
  - Tori Kelly – Hiding Place
  - Tasha Cobbs Leonard – Heart. Passion. Pursuit. Live at Passion City Church
  - Jonathan McReynolds – Make Room
  - Jekalyn Carr – One Nation Under God

=== Outstanding Music Video ===
- **Childish Gambino – "This Is America"**
  - The Carters – "Apes**t"
  - H.E.R. feat. Bryson Tiller – "Could've Been"
  - Bruno Mars feat. Cardi B – "Finesse (Remix)"
  - Kendrick Lamar & SZA – "All the Stars"

=== Outstanding Song, Traditional ===
- **Toni Braxton – "Long as I Live"**
  - Andra Day – "Amen"
  - MAJOR. – "Better With You in It"
  - Leon Bridges – "Beyond"
  - Tori Kelly feat. Kirk Franklin – "Never Alone"

=== Outstanding Song, Contemporary ===
- **Ella Mai – "Boo'd Up"**
  - John Legend feat. BloodPop – "A Good Night"
  - Bruno Mars feat. Cardi B – "Finesse (Remix)"
  - Childish Gambino – "This Is America"
  - H.E.R. – "As I Am"

=== Outstanding Album ===
- **Ella Mai – Ella Mai**
  - Janelle Monáe – Dirty Computer
  - MAJOR. – Even More
  - The Carters – Everything Is Love
  - H.E.R. – I Used to Know Her: The Prelude

=== Outstanding Soundtrack/Compilation ===
- **Kendrick Lamar, SZA feat. Various artists – Black Panther: The Album Music From and Inspired By**
  - Various artists – Greenleaf, Season 3 (Music From the Original TV series)
  - Adrian Younge & Ali Shaheed Muhammad – Marvel's Luke Cage Season Two
  - Various artists – Insecure Music From the HBO Original Series, Season 3
  - Various artists – Spider-Man: Into the Spider-Verse (Soundtrack From & Inspired By the Motion Picture)
