= Andrew Lockington =

Canadian film score composer (born 1974)

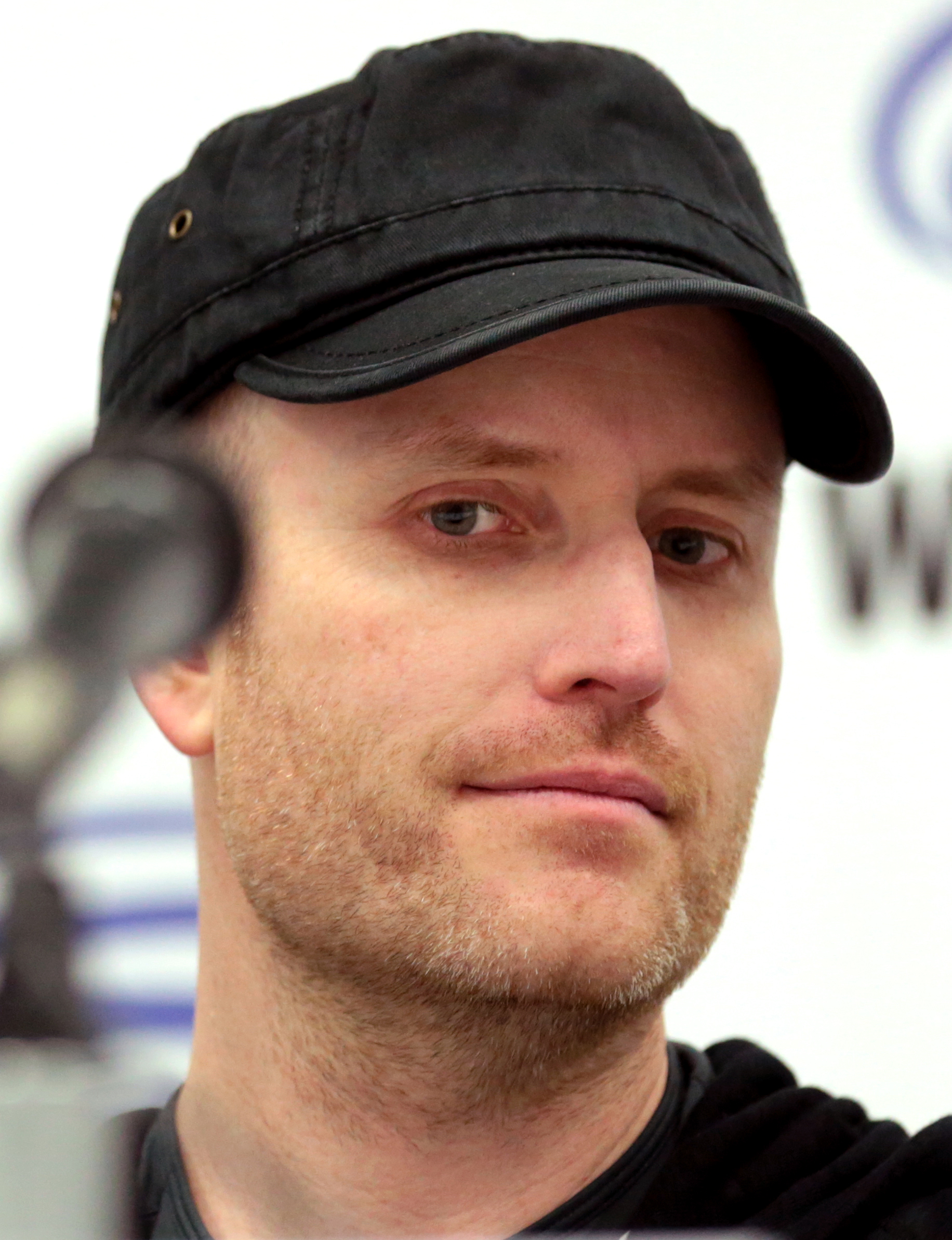
- Lockington in 2017

Background information
- Born: July 31, 1974 (age 52); Burlington, Ontario, Canada
- Occupation: Composer
- Years active: 1996–present

Andrew Lockington (born July 31, 1974) is a Canadian film score composer.

== Life and career ==
Lockington is from Burlington, Ontario. He has composed the complete scores for over three dozen films and television series, including Journey to the Center of the Earth (2008), City of Ember (2008), Percy Jackson: Sea of Monsters (2013), San Andreas (2015), The Space Between Us (2017) and Rampage (2018).

He received the Breakout Composer of the Year Award from the 2009 International Film Music Critics Association (IFMCA) Awards, for his scores for Journey to the Center of the Earth and City of Ember. He was also nominated for Best Original Score for a Fantasy/Science Fiction Film, for City of Ember.

As of 2026, he lives in Toronto with his wife and three daughters.

== Film scores ==
Year	Title	Director	Notes
1998	At the End of the Day: The Sue Rodriguez Story	Sheldon Larry	Co-composed with Mychael Danna; Television film
2000	XChange	Allan Moyle	
2001	Stranger Inside	Cheryl Dunye	Co-composed with Mychael Danna; Television film
2002	Long Life, Happiness & Prosperity	Mina Shum	
2003	Fast Food High	Nisha Ganatra	
2003	Cosmopolitan	Nisha Ganatra	Composed original score Songs by Chris Rael
2004	Touch of Pink	Ian Iqbal Rashid	
2004	Saint Ralph	Michael McGowan	
2005	Cake	Nisha Ganatra	
2006	One Dead Indian	Tim Southam	Television film
2006	Skinwalkers	James Issac	
2007	How She Move	Ian Iqbal Rashid	
2008	Journey to the Center of the Earth	Eric Brevig	BMI Film Music Award for Best Film Music
2008	One Week	Michael McGowan	
2008	City of Ember	Gil Kenan	
2008	Left Coast	Michael McGowan	Television film
2009	Deadliest Sea	T. J. Scott	Television film
2010	Frankie and Alice	Geoffrey Sax	
2011	Beat the World	Robert Adetuyi	
2012	Journey 2: The Mysterious Island	Brad Peyton	BMI Film Music Award for Best Film Music
2013	I'll Follow You Down	Richie Mehta	
2013	Percy Jackson: Sea of Monsters	Thor Freudenthal	BMI Film Music Award for Best Film Music
2013	Siddharth	Richie Mehta	
2015	San Andreas	Brad Peyton	BMI Film Music Award for Best Film Music
2016	Incarnate	Brad Peyton	
2017	The Space Between Us	Peter Chelsom	
2017	Meditation Park	Mina Shum	
2018	Rampage	Brad Peyton	
2018	Time Freak	Andrew Bowler	
2019	The Kindness of Strangers	Lone Scherfig	
2021	Trigger Point	Brad Turner	Co-composed with Michael White
2024	Atlas	Brad Peyton	
2026	Whatcha Want	Mina Shum	

== Television series scores ==
- Missing (48 episodes, 2003–2006)
- Sanctuary (46 episodes, 2009–2011): Seasons 2–4
- Primeval: New World (13 episodes, 2012–2013)
- Aftermath (13 episodes, 2016)
- Frontier (12 episodes, 2016–2017)
- Delhi Crime (7 episodes, 2019)
- Daybreak (10 episodes, 2019)
- American Gods (10 episodes, 2021)
- Mayor of Kingstown (2021–present)
- Special Ops: Lioness (2023–present)
- Landman (2024–present)
