= San Andreas (film) =

2015 film by Brad Peyton

- Theatrical release poster
- Directed by: Brad Peyton
- Screenplay by: Carlton Cuse
- Story by: Andre Fabrizio; Jeremy Passmore
- Produced by: Beau Flynn
- Starring: Dwayne Johnson; Carla Gugino; Alexandra Daddario; Ioan Gruffudd; Archie Panjabi; Paul Giamatti
- Cinematography: Steve Yedlin
- Edited by: Bob Ducsay
- Music by: Andrew Lockington
- Production companies: New Line Cinema; Village Roadshow Pictures; RatPac-Dune Entertainment; Flynn Picture Company
- Distributed by: Warner Bros. Pictures
- Release dates: May 26, 2015 (Los Angeles); May 29, 2015 (United States)
- Running time: 114 minutes
- Country: United States
- Language: English
- Budget: $110 million
- Box office: $475 million

San Andreas is a 2015 American disaster thriller film starring Dwayne Johnson. The film was directed by Brad Peyton and written by Carlton Cuse. Carla Gugino, Alexandra Daddario, Ioan Gruffudd, Archie Panjabi and Paul Giamatti also star. Its plot centers on a massive earthquake caused by the San Andreas Fault that devastates the West Coast of the United States.

Principal photography of the film started on April 22, 2014, in Queensland, Australia, and wrapped on July 28 in San Francisco. The film premiered in Hollywood, Los Angeles, on May 26, 2015, and was released by Warner Bros. Pictures in the United States on May 29. It received mixed reviews from critics, who praised the visual effects and Johnson and Gugino's performances but criticized the plot and characters. The film grossed $475 million worldwide on a $110 million budget.

== Plot ==
A Caltech seismologist, Dr. Lawrence Hayes, and his colleague Dr. Kim Park are at Hoover Dam to test a new earthquake prediction model when a previously unknown nearby fault ruptures and triggers a M_{w} 7.1 earthquake that collapses the dam. Park sacrifices himself to save a young girl and is swept away by the water.

Hayes discovers that the entire San Andreas Fault is shifting and will soon cause a chain reaction of massive earthquakes that will potentially destroy cities along the fault line. He begins racing to warn the population along with his students Alexi and Phoebe, reporter Serena Johnson, and her cameraman Dylan.

When a M_{w} 9.1 earthquake devastates Los Angeles, Ray Gaines, a chief rescue helicopter pilot of the Los Angeles Fire Department who is going through a divorce from his wife, Emma, finds himself rescuing her from a skyscraper in Los Angeles.

Meanwhile, their daughter Blake has been visiting San Francisco with Emma's new boyfriend, Daniel Riddick, who is a renowned engineer and builder. She meets Ben Taylor, a British engineer seeking employment at Daniel's firm, and Ben's younger brother, Ollie. As Daniel and Blake begin to drive out of the building, a similar magnitude earthquake strikes the city. Rubble from the collapsing parking garage pins her in Daniel's car. Daniel leaves Blake to find help, but then panics and ultimately abandons her in an act of cowardice. Ben and Ollie rescue Blake, take her to Chinatown, and call her parents for help.

Ray and Emma attempt to reach San Francisco in Ray's helicopter but it suffers a gearbox failure, which forces them to make an emergency landing at a shopping mall in Bakersfield. Amid chaos and looting, Ray steals a truck to continue the journey. The pair is waved down by an elderly couple whose car has broken down on the side of the road, stopping them from falling into the San Andreas Fault, which has torn a large fissure through the highway, creating a canyon that now extends into the far distance in both directions. Ray and Emma exchange the truck for a small airplane that the couple owns; as they fly toward San Francisco, they reminisce about their other daughter, Mallory, who drowned several years ago.

As Blake, Ben, and Ollie attempt to reach Nob Hill to signal them after finding their previous meeting point at Coit Tower engulfed in flames, Ray and Emma parachute into AT&T Park just before a M_{w} 9.6 quake hits, which becomes the largest recorded earthquake in history. As the quake subsides, having destroyed much of the city, Ray and Emma commandeer a boat to reach the group, only to realize that a tsunami is approaching San Francisco Bay. Alongside a handful of other survivors in boats and small ships, they cross the wave before it crests, barely avoiding a container ship caught up in the tsunami wave. The ship crashes into the Golden Gate Bridge's center span, killing everyone on the bridge, including Daniel, who is crushed by a falling shipping container.

The tsunami strikes the already ruined city, capsizing a cruise ship and killing thousands more. Blake, Ben, and Ollie enter the Gate, a building whose construction Daniel had been overseeing, but they are still caught by the tsunami. As the building begins to collapse, trapping Blake underwater, Ray dives in, rescues her, and performs CPR. Emma crashes the boat through a window and drives the five of them out of the collapsing building as Ray resuscitates Blake.

The survivors regroup at a relief camp on the other side of the bay, where the reconciled Ray and Emma talk about their future. On the remains of the Golden Gate Bridge, an American flag unfurls and gives hope that the city will recover and rebuild. Rescue vehicles descend on the destroyed landscape of the San Francisco Bay Area; the San Francisco Peninsula has been turned into an island and San Francisco Bay now extends from San Jose to Santa Cruz.

== Cast ==
- Dwayne Johnson as Raymond "Ray" Gaines, a chief rescue helicopter pilot with the Los Angeles Fire Department
- Carla Gugino as Emma Gaines, Ray's estranged wife
- Alexandra Daddario as Blake Gaines, Ray and Emma's daughter
- Hugo Johnstone-Burt as Ben Taylor, Ollie's older brother, an English engineer and Blake's love interest
- Art Parkinson as Ollie Taylor, Ben's younger brother
- Paul Giamatti as Dr. Lawrence Hayes, a Caltech seismologist
- Ioan Gruffudd as Daniel Riddick, Emma's boyfriend and the owner of a civil engineering firm
- Archie Panjabi as Serena Johnson, a news reporter
- Will Yun Lee as Dr. Kim Park, a Caltech seismologist, and Lawrence's research partner and closest friend
- Kylie Minogue as Susan Riddick, Daniel's sister
- Alec Utgoff as Alexi, Lawrence's student
- Todd Williams as Marcus Crowlings, a fellow Los Angeles Fire Department rescue worker (and helicopter winch operator)
- Marissa Neitling as Phoebe, Lawrence's student
- Matt Gerald as Harrison Rhodes, a fellow Los Angeles Fire Department rescue worker (and helicopter co-pilot)
- Colton Haynes as Joby O'Leary, a Los Angeles Fire Department rescue helicopter (and rope-climbing winchman)
- Arabella Morton as Mallory Gaines, Ray and Emma's other daughter and Blake's sister, who drowned in a rafting accident (flashback)
- Morgan Griffin as Natalie
- Breanne Hill as Larissa, a waitress
- Julian Shaw as Stoner
- John Reynolds as Daniel's driver
- Hugh Francis as Daniel's assistant
- Brad McMurry as Riddick Building Security Guard
- Ben McIvor as Dylan, Serena's cameraman
- Joey Vieira as a man in parking garage

== Production ==
=== Development ===
On December 1, 2011, it was announced that New Line Cinema was developing an earthquake disaster film, San Andreas: 3D. from a script by Jeremy Passmore and Andre Fabrizio; Allan Loeb polished the script. On June 5, 2012, the studio set Brad Peyton to direct the film. On July 18, 2012, New Line tapped Carlton Cuse to rewrite the script for the earthquake disaster film. On July 18, 2013, The Conjuring writers Carey Hayes and Chad Hayes were tapped by the studio to rewrite the film again. The film was also produced by New Line and Village Roadshow Pictures, along with Flynn Picture Company and Australian limited Village Roadshow.

=== Casting ===
On October 14, 2013, Dwayne Johnson closed a deal to star in the film to play the role of a helicopter pilot searching for his daughter after an earthquake. On February 4, 2014, Alexandra Daddario joined the cast. On March 12, 2014, Carla Gugino joined the cast and reunited with Dwayne Johnson with whom she starred in Race to Witch Mountain and Faster. On March 14, 2014, Game of Thrones actor Art Parkinson joined the film's cast. On April 1, 2014, Archie Panjabi joined the earthquake film. On April 5, 2014, Todd Williams also joined the film, to play Marcus Crowlings, an old Army friend of Johnson's character. On April 15, 2014, Colton Haynes was added to the cast of the film. On April 29, Ioan Gruffudd joined the cast of the film. Gruffudd played Daniel Reddick, a wealthy real estate developer who is dating Johnson's character's estranged wife. On May 28, Will Yun Lee joined the cast to play Dr. Kim Park, the co-director of the Caltech Seismology Lab in the film. On June 11, Australian singer and actress Kylie Minogue joined the film to play Gruffudd's sister.

=== Filming ===
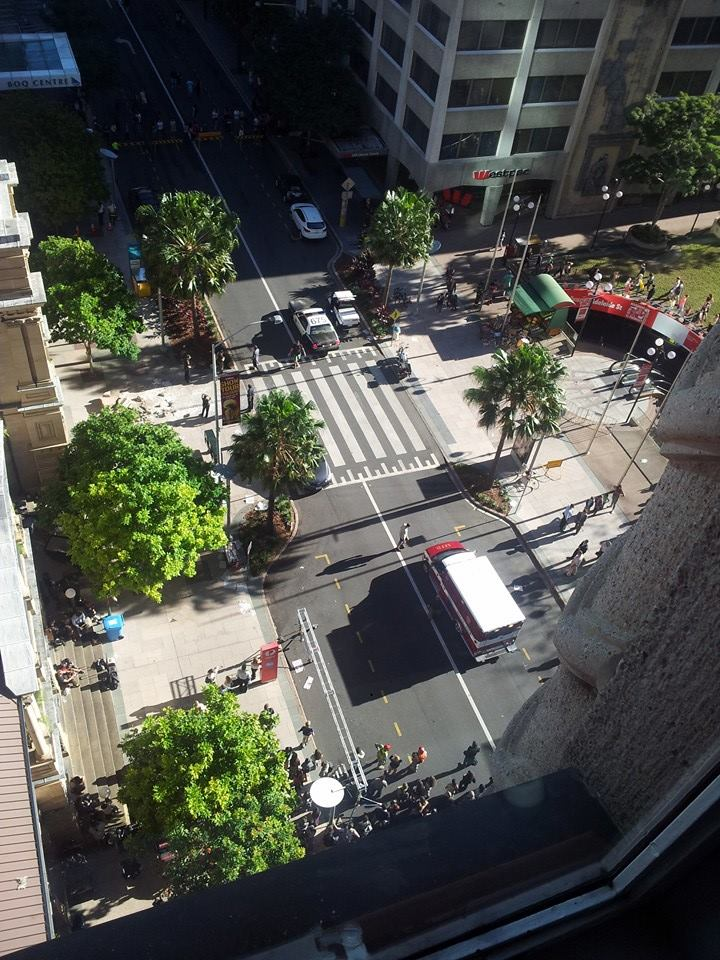
Second unit filming on Queen Street in Brisbane, Queensland, Australia on June 22, 2014

On December 17, 2013, Variety reported that the film would be shot at Village Roadshow Studios in Gold Coast, Queensland, Australia. The production was set to start in April 2014 in Queensland, with locations including Ipswich, various suburban locations across the Gold Coast, and Brisbane. On March 20, 2014, it was announced that Gods of Egypt had started production in Australia, and San Andreas was set to begin soon after. On April 16, 2014, Johnson tweeted photos from the training for the film.

Filming began on April 22, 2014, in Australia and was also shot in the Los Angeles area, Bakersfield, and San Francisco. On May 12, shooting took place in the Lockyer Valley. On May 10–11, shooting was taking place in Los Angeles and then production went back to Australia to complete the rest of shooting. On May 17, second unit was filming scenes in Bakersfield where a helicopter was spotted, and Johnson was busy in Gold Coast. On June 22, the crew was spotted filming disaster scenes on Elizabeth Street in Brisbane.

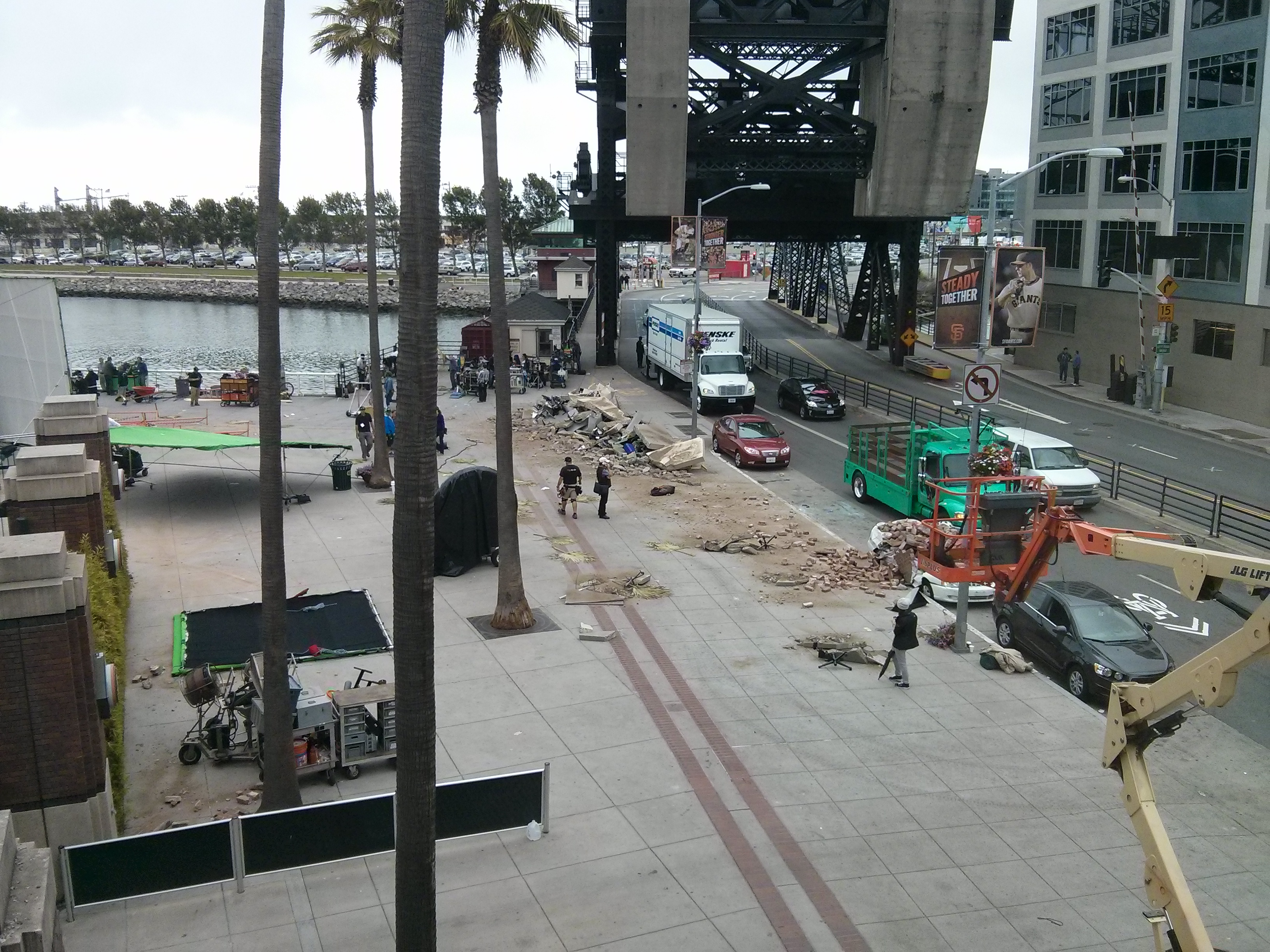
Filming outside AT&T Park

The film's second-unit started shooting on July 8, in San Francisco, and the first unit began shooting on July 21, wrapping up on July 27. On July 15–16, first unit was filming at Fisherman's Wharf, and a second unit was also filming on the Embarcadero on July 16. On July 21, the filming was taking place at AT&T Park, where the crew shot a scene during a San Francisco Giants game. On July 22, they filmed an earthquake with fake victims and fake garbage at Hyde and Lombard Streets, on Russian Hill. On July 23, crews were filming disaster scenes in The Armory. On July 26, they filmed some scenes near the Fairmont Hotel, with the last day of filming spent shooting on California Street in the Financial District, wrapping up filming on July 27, 2014.

=== Visual effects ===
The visual effects are provided by Hydraulx, Cinesite and Image Engine and Supervised by Greg and Colin Strause, Holger Voss and Martyn Culpitt with help from Scanline VFX and Method Studios.

=== Music ===
On July 24, 2014, it was announced that Andrew Lockington would be composing the music for the film.

Three teasers were revealed, and two of them included Robot Koch & Delhia de France and Sia singing "California Dreamin'" by The Mamas and the Papas.

Track listing
No.	Title	Length
1.	"San Andreas Main Title"	1:42
2.	"Natalie's Rescue"	5:16
3.	"Caltech"	2:05
4.	"Divorce Papers"	3:28
5.	"Hoover Dam"	2:48
6.	"San Francisco"	1:51
7.	"Connecting the Dots"	1:40
8.	"Emma's Rescue"	5:41
9.	"Escaping the Tower"	1:39
10.	"Need a News Feed"	2:40
11.	"Blake's Trapped"	2:04
12.	"Remembering Mallory"	3:05
13.	"Coit Tower Destroyed"	3:33
14.	"Skydive"	2:50
15.	"Stanchion Collapse"	2:44
16.	"Plan B"	2:31
17.	"Tsunami"	2:46
18.	"Extinction"	1:00
19.	"The Kiss"	3:08
20.	"I'll Bring Her Back"	3:12
21.	"I Love You Dad"	3:25
22.	"Resuscitation"	6:38
23.	"San Andreas End Credits"	2:57
Total length:		72:12

== Release ==
San Andreas premiered on May 26, 2015, at the Dolby Theatre in Hollywood, Los Angeles. It was initially scheduled for a 2D and 3D release on June 5, 2015, but was later moved up a week. San Andreas was also released in Dolby Vision, making it Warner Bros. Pictures' first film to adopt the format.

=== Home media ===
San Andreas was released as a digital download, and on Blu-ray and DVD on October 13, 2015. Upon its first week of release on home media in the U.S., the film topped the Nielsen VideoScan First Alert chart, which tracks overall disc sales, and debuted at number 2 at the Blu-ray Disc sales chart with 40% of unit sales coming from Blu-ray. It was blocked by the Diamond Edition Blu-ray Disc edition of the 1992 Disney animated classic Aladdin. As of 2016, it is available in 4K UHD Blu-ray.

== Box office ==
San Andreas grossed $155.2 million in the United States and Canada and $319.4 million in other territories, for a worldwide total of $475 million. Deadline Hollywood calculated the film's net profit as $88.07 million, accounting for production budgets, marketing, talent participations, and other costs; box office grosses and home media revenues placed it eighteenth on their list of 2015's "Most Valuable Blockbusters". As of July 2022, the film remained the highest-grossing live-action Hollywood original film .

=== North America ===
San Andreas opened in North America across 3,777 theaters including a total of 3,200 3D locations. Several days prior to the film's release various box office pundits were predicting a $40 million or more opening in North America. It made $3.1 million from Thursday night showings and $18.2 million on its opening day. It earned $54.5 million in its opening weekend which was well above the tracking and predictions. It was Johnson's biggest opening as a lead actor, surpassing the $36 million debut of his The Scorpion King in 2002 even after adjusting for inflation. Warner Bros. distribution chief Dan Fellman commented about the successful opening, saying that audiences never get tired of disaster films, even going back to The Poseidon Adventure (1972). He added, "What also gets tiring is when you start to do sequels of the same thing. It needs to be fresh, and you have to have the right chemistry in the cast", pointing out the originality of the film, and the performances of Johnson and the other cast, as some of the factors behind the film's successful opening. In its second weekend, it experienced a drop of 52% earning an estimated $26.4 million, falling in second place (behind Spy), but experiencing a smaller fall than that of other disaster movies.

=== Outside North America ===
Outside North America, the film opened in a total of 60 countries in the same weekend, including France, the United Kingdom, Mexico, and Australia. It opened Wednesday, May 27 in 4 countries, added 38 countries on Thursday and 18 more countries on Friday, May 29 and through Sunday, May 31 earned a 5-day opening weekend total of $63.9 million from 15,420 screens in 60 countries debuting at first place in 55 of those countries as well as at the international box office. In its second weekend, it added $97.7 million. It topped the box office outside of North America for two consecutive weekends before being overtaken by Jurassic World in its third weekend.

It had the biggest opening for a disaster movie and second-biggest for Warner Bros. in Mexico with $10.1 million from 3,100 screens. In China, it had a three-day opening weekend of $35 million and six-day opening total of $51.8 million from 8,795 screens, although Chinese box office analysts site Entgroup reported a $55 million opening. Despite health concerns over the MERS virus, which resulted in the plunge of theater admissions, the film opened to $7.2 million in South Korea (including Wednesday sneaks) and topped the box office. It had similar successful openings in the UK, Ireland and Malta ($7.2 million), Russia and the CIS ($5.3 million), Brazil ($3.2 million) France ($3.1 million), India ($2.5 million), Australia ($2.4 million), Hong Kong ($2.2 million) and Germany ($2 million). It became Warner Bros.' highest-grossing film of all time in Mexico, Chile, Colombia, Peru and Venezuela, and in China it is the fourth highest. As of June 28, 2015 in total earnings, its largest market outside of North America are China ($103.2 million) and Mexico ($28.4 million).

== Reception ==
On Rotten Tomatoes, a review aggregator, the film has an approval rating of 48% based on 253 reviews and an average rating of 5.2/10. The website's critical consensus reads, "San Andreas has a great cast and outstanding special effects, but amidst all the senses-shattering destruction, the movie's characters and plot prove less than structurally sound." On Metacritic, the film has a score of 43 out of 100 based on 42 critics, indicating "mixed or average reviews". Audiences polled by CinemaScore gave the film an average grade of "A−" on an A+ to F scale.

IGN awarded it a score of 7.5 out of 10, saying, "There are some cracks in the foundation, but San Andreas is solid popcorn fare thanks to sharp visuals and The Rock."

Writing in Variety, Andrew Barker wrote, "Of the many charges that can be levied against Brad Peyton's San Andreas, false advertising is not one of them. The disaster pic promises nothing more than the complete CGI destruction of California as foregrounded by Dwayne Johnson's jackfruit-sized biceps, and it delivers exactly that". Andrew O'Hehir wrote in Salon, "Considered as pure spectacle, San Andreas is gripping and effective, as well as a somewhat interesting form of counter-narrative: A vision of near-term apocalypse that has nothing to do with climate change, monsters or alien invaders". Entertainment Weekly's critic Chris Nashawaty wrote, "As patently preposterous, scientifically dubious, and unapologetically corny as director Brad Peyton's orgy of CGI devastation is, its popcorn prophecy of the inevitable is a blast of giddy, disposable fun". Mick LaSalle wrote in The San Francisco Chronicle, "Some movies are easy to mock, but hard to resist. This is one of them".

The American Geosciences Institute's Earth Magazine called the film "dreadful" from a scientific perspective and criticized it for "perpetuat[ing] geologic absurdities", also pointing out that "despite the notoriety of the San Andreas Fault, it is not the greatest seismic threat to the Bay Area", with the nearby Hayward Fault having the potential to cause immense damage to bridges, roads, utilities and communications with a smaller magnitude quake due to its proximity to areas of dense urban population. While a full rupture along the Cascadia Subduction Zone would be the worst disaster of US history, a rupture along the Hayward fault would affect a much smaller area where the impact on the urban infrastructure could be mitigated by retrofitting, enforcement of seismic building codes and other preparedness measures.

=== Accolades ===
At the 2015 Teen Choice Awards, San Andreas was nominated for Choice Movie: Action. Daddario and Johnson received a nomination for Choice Movie Actress: Action and Choice Summer Movie Star: Male, respectively. It garnered nominations for Outstanding Visual Effects in a Photoreal Feature, Outstanding Effects Simulations in a Photoreal Feature (earned two), and Outstanding Compositing in a Feature Motion Picture at the 14th Visual Effects Society Awards. Johnson was nominated for Best Action Performance and Best Hero at the 2016 MTV Movie Awards.

== Sequel ==
In February 2016, New Line announced that a sequel is in development, and its plot will reportedly focus on the Ring of Fire. Neil Widener and Gavin James were hired as screenwriters, while Brad Peyton and Beau Flynn will return as director and producer, respectively. Johnson is set to reprise his role, while Gugino, Daddario and Giamatti are expected to return as well. Johnson and Peyton were announced to serve as producers. In July 2021, Daddario expressed her doubts that a sequel was happening.

In November 2021, Johnson announced that they are still developing the sequel, while stating that scheduling conflicts are why the production has not started yet. He elaborated that his studio looks for projects that have what they internally call the "Moses Effect", explaining that this means that they take immediate precedence over the rest of the many projects on their film-slate; stating that he feels like the sequel falls into this category. In December 2021, Hiram Garcia confirmed that Warner Bros. Pictures wants a sequel, while Seven Bucks Productions delayed development in favor of other projects.
