= Incarnate (film) =

2016 American horror film

- Theatrical release poster
- Directed by: Brad Peyton
- Written by: Ronnie Christensen
- Produced by: Jason Blum; Trevor Engelson; Michael Seitzman
- Starring: Aaron Eckhart; Carice van Houten; Catalina Sandino Moreno; David Mazouz; Keir O'Donnell; Matt Nable; John Pirruccello
- Cinematography: Dana Gonzales
- Edited by: Todd E. Miller; Jonathan Chibnall
- Music by: Andrew Lockington
- Production companies: Blumhouse Productions; WWE Studios; IM Global; Deep Underground Films
- Distributed by: BH Tilt; High Top Releasing
- Release date: December 2, 2016
- Running time: 87 minutes
- Country: United States
- Language: English
- Budget: $5 million
- Box office: $9 million

Incarnate is a 2016 American supernatural horror film directed by Brad Peyton and written by Ronnie Christensen. It stars Aaron Eckhart, Carice van Houten, Catalina Sandino Moreno, David Mazouz, Keir O'Donnell, Matt Nable, and John Pirruccello.

The film was released on December 2, 2016, by Blumhouse Tilt and High Top Releasing.

== Plot ==
An 11-year-old boy named Cameron Sparrow is attacked by a hooded stranger who tries to kill him. However, Cameron kills her instead and looks at the camera with red eyes, revealing that he is actually possessed by a demon named "Maggie".

Meanwhile, Dr. Seth Ember approaches a man named Henry in a club and makes him realize he is dreaming. Ember reveals that the woman Henry has been with is a demon who has possessed his body. The two escape and return to reality, and Henry is freed from the demon. In the waking world, Ember uses a wheelchair. Ember's assistant Oliver warns that the demons have started to adapt to Ember's efforts and that soon he may not be able to escape back to reality.

Ember is approached by Camilla, a representative from the Vatican, who asks him to exorcise Cameron. Ember refuses, stating that his methods are not "exorcisms," but Camilla reveals that she believes the demon is one Ember knows. Ember visits a priest named Felix to question whether the demon could indeed be Maggie, which Felix affirms. Felix offers him a vial of blood from a possessed man which, when injected, would allow Ember about ten seconds of lucidity - just enough time to commit suicide, but he refuses.

Ember meets the boy's mother Lindsay and explains that he does not exorcise demons but evicts them by entering their host's subconscious to make them realize they are dreaming. Demons do not have the power to truly control those they possess; instead, they lull their hosts into comforting dreams so they will be unaware while the demon uses their body. He visits the possessed Cameron and the demon recognizes him.

Ember, Oliver, and the third member of their team, Riley prepare for the eviction. Riley explains that by entering a near-death state, Ember will be able to synchronize his brain frequencies to Cameron's and enter his subconscious. However, in this state, Ember has only about eight minutes before his heart will give out. Ember enters Cameron's dream and sees him with his father, Dan, but has a seizure and has to be pulled out of the dream to be revived.

Ember demands that Dan be present to help evict the demon. Lindsay refuses, explaining that the couple separated after Dan broke Cameron's arm in a drunken rage, but she agrees when Ember insists that Cameron's father might be the only way to save Cameron. Dan's presence initially seems to help, but Maggie lashes out at him. Ember pleads with Maggie to release Dan since Ember is the one Maggie wants. The demon does so but Dan dies from his injuries. Lindsay, alarmed, demands to know Ember's history with the demon. Ember reveals he discovered that he had the power to perform astral projection and enter the dreams of possessed people, but hid his power to live a normal life. However, this made him a target for demons. One day, while driving with his wife and child, the three were hit by a car driven by a possessed driver. The attack left Ember's family dead and is the reason that he needs to use a wheelchair, and ever since, he's been hunting the demon "Maggie," whom he named after the woman it had possessed.

Ember visits Felix to acquire the blood vial but discovers that Felix has been possessed. Felix attacks Ember and commits suicide. Returning to Cameron's dream, Ember uses a ring Cameron had received as a gift from his real father to make the boy realize he is in an illusion. The pair flee from Maggie, and Ember helps Cameron escape. Ember and Cameron wake up, but Ember wakes up again in a hospital with his wife and son. He realizes he's now inside his own dream and begs Maggie to release Cameron and take him instead, to which the demon agrees. However, when Ember wakes up for real, Riley administers the blood and Ember uses his ten seconds to throw himself through the apartment window. As he dies, Riley warns everybody not to touch Ember's body.

Paramedics attempt to resuscitate Ember, joined by Camilla. They succeed in getting a heartbeat, allowing Maggie to possess Camilla before Ember dies.

== Cast ==
- Aaron Eckhart as Dr. Seth Ember
- Carice van Houten as Lindsay Sparrow
- David Mazouz as Cameron Sparrow
- Catalina Sandino Moreno as Camilla Marquez
- Keir O'Donnell as Oliver
- Emily Jackson as Riley
- Matt Nable as Dan Sparrow
- Karolina Wydra as Anna Ember
- Emjay Anthony as Jake Ember
- John Purruccello as Henry
- Mark Steger as Maggie (Demon)
- Tomas Arana as Felix
- Mark Henry as Bouncer #2

== Production ==
Brad Peyton was hired to direct & executive producer the film. Ronnie Christensen was hired to write the film. Blumhouse Productions and WWE Studios were hired to be the production companies.

Aaron Eckhart was cast in the film on September 17, 2013, followed by Mark Henry in November 25. Catalina Sandino Moreno, David Mazouz, George Anthony Anisimow and Karolina Wydra were cast later.

== Music ==
Andrew Lockington composed the score. The soundtrack is now released at IM Global Music.

== Reception ==
=== Box office ===
Incarnate was released in the United States on December 2, 2016, and was expected to gross $2–4 million from 1,737 theaters in its opening weekend. It ended up grossing $2.5 million, finishing 9th at the box office.

=== Critical response ===
On the review aggregator website Rotten Tomatoes, 18% of 34 critics' reviews are positive. The website's consensus reads: "Incarnate can't be accused of lack of ideas -- if only any of them made sense or coalesced in any meaningful or scary way." Metacritic, which uses a weighted average, assigned the film a score of 30 out of 100, based on 9 critics, indicating "generally unfavorable" reviews. Audiences polled by CinemaScore gave the film an average grade of "C−" on an A+ to F scale.
