= Rampage (2018 film) =

Film by Brad Peyton

- Theatrical release poster
- Directed by: Brad Peyton
- Screenplay by: Ryan Engle; Carlton Cuse; Ryan J. Condal; Adam Sztykiel
- Story by: Ryan Engle
- Based on: Rampage by Midway Games
- Produced by: Brad Peyton; Beau Flynn; John Rickard; Hiram Garcia
- Starring: Dwayne Johnson; Naomie Harris; Malin Akerman; Jake Lacy; Jeffrey Dean Morgan
- Cinematography: Jaron Presant
- Edited by: Jim May; Bob Ducsay
- Music by: Andrew Lockington
- Production companies: New Line Cinema; Wrigley Pictures; Flynn Picture Company; Seven Bucks Productions
- Distributed by: Warner Bros. Pictures
- Release dates: April 4, 2018 (Microsoft Theater); April 13, 2018 (United States)
- Running time: 107 minutes
- Country: United States
- Language: English
- Budget: $120–140 million
- Box office: $428 million

Rampage is a 2018 American science fiction monster film loosely based on the video game series by Midway Games and starring Dwayne Johnson, with Naomie Harris, Malin Akerman, Jake Lacy and Jeffrey Dean Morgan in supporting roles. The film was directed by Brad Peyton and written by Ryan Engle, Carlton Cuse, Ryan J. Condal and Adam Sztykiel. In the film, a primatologist and his leucistic gorilla friend, George, collaborate on stopping a pair of other animals that, along with George, have been mutated into raging beasts with fluctuating size enhancements thanks to a gene-manipulating pathogen and attack Chicago.

Principal photography began in April 2017 in Chicago. The film was released in the United States on April 13, 2018, by Warner Bros. Pictures. It received mixed reviews from critics and grossed $428 million on a $120–140 million budget.

== Plot ==
Athena-1, a space station owned by nefarious gene-manipulation company Energyne, is destroyed after a laboratory rat mutates and wreaks havoc. Kerry Atkins, the lone surviving crew member, manages to escape in an escape pod before the station implodes, along with a trio of pathogen canisters that Energyne CEO Claire Wyden ordered her to retrieve, but the pod disintegrates upon re-entry, killing Atkins. One canister is swallowed by an American crocodile named Lizzie in Everglades National Park and another lands in a Wyoming forest where a wolf named Ralph is exposed to the pathogen.

Primatologist Davis Okoye, a former Special Forces soldier and member of an anti-poaching unit, works at the San Diego Zoo Safari Park. He is friends with George, a rare leucistic western lowland gorilla that he rescued from poachers, and communicates with him via sign language. The third Energyne canister lands in George's habitat, exposing him to the pathogen.

As George grows considerably larger and more aggressive, Davis is contacted by genetic engineer Doctor Kate Caldwell, who explains that the pathogen was developed by Energyne to rewrite genes on a massive scale. She had hoped to advance research on CRISPR as a potential cure for diseases, but discovered Energyne's plans to use it as a biological weapon and was falsely incarcerated, during which her terminally ill brother passed away. George escapes from captivity and runs amok at the preserve. Davis calms him, but George is captured by a government team led by Agent Harvey Russell and put on a Boeing C-17 Globemaster III. Meanwhile, Claire and her brother Brett oversee a mercenary team's attempt to capture Ralph, but the entire team is killed.

Claire, resolving to capture Ralph and use George to cover up her plot, uses a massive transmitter atop the Willis Tower to lure the animals – engineered to respond aggressively to a certain radio frequency – to Chicago, unconcerned about the massive risk to civilian lives this poses. George reacts violently to the sound and crashes the plane, though Davis, Kate and Harvey parachute to safety. George survives the crash and joins Ralph as they make their way to Chicago, while Davis and Kate are aided by Harvey in stealing a UH-60 Black Hawk to pursue them.

Davis and Kate arrive to find George and Ralph tearing through Chicago as the military struggles to stop them; the situation worsens when Lizzie joins the duo. Planning to steal an antidote to turn the animals back to normal, Davis and Kate infiltrate Energyne's base of operations at the tower, but are caught by the Wydens as Claire reveals that the antidote only eliminates the animals' enhanced aggression rather than reversing all of the pathogen's effects. When George climbs to the top of the tower, Claire orders Davis to distract him while she attempts to escape with Kate at gunpoint. Kate slips a vial of the antidote into Claire's handbag and has George swallow her whole along with it, restoring his former personality. Harvey takes incriminating evidence from Brett and allows him to escape, but Brett is crushed to death by falling debris. As the damaged tower topples, Davis and Kate survive by crash-landing the nearby helicopter on the Federal Plaza.

Davis stays to help George defeat the other animals, while Kate and Harvey rush to prevent the military from deploying a GBU-43/B MOAB against them. During their confrontation, Davis tricks Ralph into attacking Lizzie, who decapitates him, and George ultimately manages to vanquish Lizzie by stabbing her in the eye with a broken rebar. With the threat neutralized, the airstrike is aborted and Davis is joined by his allies in rescuing civilians.

== Cast ==
=== Humans ===
- Dwayne Johnson as Davis Okoye, a former US Army Special Forces soldier as well as primatologist and head of an anti-poaching unit.
- Naomie Harris as Katherine "Kate" Caldwell, a disgraced genetic engineer who collaborates with Davis.
- Malin Akerman as Claire Wyden, the CEO of Energyne, the company behind the pathogen that incited George, Lizzie and Ralph's mutations.
- Jeffrey Dean Morgan as Harvey Russell, a government agent who works for the "Other Government Agency".
- Jake Lacy as Brett Wyden, Claire's dimwitted and neurotic brother.
- Joe Manganiello as Burke, the leader of a private military group.
- Marley Shelton as Kerry Atkins, a scientist and astronaut.
- P. J. Byrne as Nelson, a scientist and friend of Okoye.
- Demetrius Grosse as Colonel Blake
- Jack Quaid as Connor
- Breanne Hill as Amy
- Matt Gerald as Zammit
- Will Yun Lee as Agent Park
- Urijah Faber as Garrick

=== Gorillas ===
- Jason Liles as the motion capture performance of George, a leucistic western lowland gorilla, comparable to Snowflake, raised and trained by Davis. George is highly intelligent, understanding sign language with which he uses to communicate with his master, but additionally has an immature sense of humour, often joking with Davis. He eventually becomes one of the animals afflicted by Energyne's pathogen.
- Skye Notary and Willow Notary as the respective motion capture performances of Femi and Enu, a female gorilla duo who live with George.
- Vincent Roxburgh as the motion capture performance of Paavo, a young male gorilla who lives with George (uncredited).

== Production ==
=== Development ===
Warner Bros. acquired the film adaptation rights to the 1986 arcade game Rampage in 2009, as part of their acquisition of Midway Games for $33 million. The project was announced in November 2011, with John Rickard set as a producer. Rickard said that he decided to work on the movie by searching the list of titles to which Warner held the adapting rights and, upon finding Rampage, remembering playing the arcade game. In June 2015, Dwayne Johnson was set to star, re-teaming with New Line and producer Beau Flynn, while the studio was looking for a director to start production in mid-2016. Johnson mentioned that he loved the game as a child, playing the arcade game in a pool hall and later owning it on the Nintendo Entertainment System. During the search for a script, writers offered many takes, including a faithful one to the game where the monsters were mutated humans, before the producers settled on the one by Ryan Engle, who aimed to make a "love letter to the monster movies I grew up watching", such as Jaws and Jurassic Park, while making it clear that the animals were not the heroes.

After Dwayne Johnson was cast, in July, Brad Peyton went to direct and produce. Between January and July 2017, the rest of the supporting cast was assembled.

Rampage marked the final released Warner Bros. film to be financed by Access Entertainment / RatPac-Dune Entertainment as the studio had ended their partnership with the company due to sexual harassment allegations against RatPac-Dune owner Brett Ratner (which resulted in the company going uncredited). The company subsequently dissolved later that year.

=== Filming ===
Principal photography on the film began on April 17, 2017, in Chicago, Illinois. The film also was shot in Atlanta, Georgia.

Easter eggs to the original game were featured, as Energyne's offices have a Rampage arcade machine, George eats a person who he pulls out of a building he demolished and Claire is devoured while wearing a red dress, just as the woman featured in the arcade's opening screen.

=== Visual effects ===
The visual effects were primarily provided by Weta Digital. Effects supervisor Erik Winquist and a small crew travelled to Chicago to create a model of the Chicago Loop that would be destroyed in the climactic battle, learning the building materials and architecture styles. Up to 15,000 photographs were taken with 3D scanners, while motion cameras covered downtown Chicago. As reference for the building destruction, the artists studied both the World Trade Center collapse from 2001 and implosions of buildings affected by the 2016 Kaikōura earthquake in Weta's hometown of Wellington. One of the more challenging aspects for Weta was figuring out how the weight and mass of the monsters would affect the city environment and destruction.

Given Weta had plenty of experience creating animated apes in King Kong and Rise of the Planet of the Apes and its sequels Dawn and War, it helped the studio create George "in a much shorter time than it may have 10 years ago", according to Winquist. Motion capture coach Terry Notary even took a break from Avengers: Infinity War, which was also filmed in Atlanta, to help Jason Liles in his performance as George. On the other hand, the lack of motion capture for Ralph and Lizzie let the animators go loose with how these monsters were portrayed, such as "a wolf that has porcupine spines and wings".

Other VFX companies, including Hydraulx, Scanline VFX and UPP, contributed to the film.

== Music ==
The music was composed by Andrew Lockington. The film marked Lockington's fourth collaboration with director Brad Peyton. An exclusive track was also released by Kid Cudi titled "The Rage" which plays in the film's end credits. The soundtrack was released digitally on April 13, 2018, by WaterTower Music.

== Marketing ==
As part of the promotion, three new games were made available: one is a browser game called Rampage: City Smash; another an arcade beat 'em up playing more as a redemption game, was made available at Dave & Buster's; and a free VR game called Project Rampage VR.

== Release ==
=== Theatrical ===
Rampage was released on April 13, 2018, by Warner Bros. Pictures, after initially being set for release a week later, on April 20. The release date was moved up after Avengers: Infinity War had also shifted its release up by a week, to April 27, so as to provide Rampage with a two-week cushion. The film was coincidentally released 3 weeks after Pacific Rim Uprising, another American kaiju film.

=== Home media ===
Rampage was released on Digital HD on June 26, 2018, and on 4K UHD, Blu-ray 3D, Blu-ray and DVD on July 17, 2018. To date, Rampage has sold $28.7 million worth of DVDs and Blu-rays in North America.

== Reception ==
=== Box office ===
Rampage grossed $101 million in the United States and Canada and $327 million in other territories for a worldwide total of $428 million against a production budget of $120 million plus another $140 million for the marketing budget. Deadline Hollywood reported that the film was likely to break even two years after its release after accounting for all revenue streams.

In the United States and Canada, Rampage was released alongside Truth or Dare and Sgt. Stubby: An American Hero, as well as the wide expansion of Isle of Dogs, and was projected to gross $35–40 million from 3,950 theaters in its opening weekend. The film made $11.5 million on its first day (including $2.4 million from Thursday night previews), $13.9 million on Saturday, and a total of $35.7 million over the weekend, finishing first at the box office. Like many films starring Johnson, the audience demographics were diverse, with 43% being Caucasian, 21% Hispanic, 19% African American, and 14% Asian. The film dropped 41% in its second weekend to $21 million, finishing second behind A Quiet Place, which was in its third week. In its third weekend, the film fell 64% to $7.1 million, finishing fourth. It fell 35% in its fourth weekend, grossing $4.6 million and finishing fifth. In its fifth weekend, it fell just 27% and grossed $3.3 million and finished seventh.

=== Critical response ===
On review aggregator Rotten Tomatoes, the film holds an approval rating of 51% based on 283 reviews, and an average rating of 5.3/10. The website's critical consensus reads: "Rampage isn't as fun as its source material, but the movie's sheer button-mashing abandon might satisfy audiences in the mood for a brainless blockbuster." It became the best-reviewed live-action video game film in the history of the site until the release of Pokémon Detective Pikachu the following year. On Metacritic, the film has a weighted average score of 45 out of 100, based on 46 critics, indicating "mixed or average reviews". Audiences polled by CinemaScore gave the film an average grade of "A−" on an A+ to F scale, while PostTrak reported adult and children filmgoers gave it respective overall positive scores of 90% and 86%.

Variety's Peter Debruge gave the film a moderately positive review, saying: "However derivative it may be, Rampage knows its audience—namely, Transformers fans and kids born after 9/11 for whom elaborately orchestrated scenes of falling skyscrapers carry nary a whiff of real-world trauma.... What director Peyton lacks in artistic vision he compensates for in his ability to wrangle such a CG-intensive production". Brian Tallerico of RogerEbert.com gave the film 2.5/4 stars, and wrote that "when Johnson is doing that movie action star thing he does so well and giant animals are going enormous-mano-a-enormous-mano, there's undeniably goofy fun to be had. You just have to be patient during the downtime". The Mir Fantastiki review gave the movie 7/10, claiming it's a stupid movie, but one that's good at what it's supposed to be, and honest about not being any more than that.

Michael Phillips of the Chicago Tribune gave the film 1.5 out of 4 stars, reviewing: "Rampage is a drag. Three times during the thing, I wrote down the phrase 'NO FUN', with increasingly impatient underlines". In an article for The Hollywood Reporter, Nick Allen wrote about what he called the film's "disastrous" tone, saying that "despite the Rampage arcade cabinets being constantly visible in its villains' headquarters, director Brad Peyton's live-action adaptation comes off as too emotionally glib and mean-spirited, even for a mega-budget B-movie".

Empire described it as quintessential Johnson project: "it sounds like a dreadful basis for a movie. And it sort of is, but it's also sort of a lot of fun". Empire notes that the film is not as tongue-in-cheek as viewers might expect, concluding that "Rampage is big dumb fun, but not as big, dumb and fun as it could have been".

=== Accolades ===
Rampage was nominated for three Teen Choice Awards, in the category Choice Sci-Fi Movie, and for the acting performances of Dwayne Johnson (Choice Sci-Fi Movie Actor) and Naomie Harris (Choice Sci-Fi Movie Actress).

== Lawsuit allegations ==
In late March 2018, German director Uwe Boll, famous for his movie adaptations of video games, threatened to file a lawsuit against Warner Bros. if the studio did not change the film's title. Boll, who produced and directed an unrelated Rampage film trilogy, about a spree killing revolutionary who shares Boll's political views, claimed that the Warner Bros. film would "shrink" his brand and revenues he could use for future installments of his Rampage films. He also went on to say that the Warner Bros. film "confuses the audience" and is "one of those typical feelgood, popcorn movies..."

== Potential sequel ==
In July 2017, Dwayne Johnson discussed the potential for a sequel and offered an appearance role to Mike Matei. By April 2018, director Brad Peyton stated that he was open to returning as director for a potential sequel, while confirming that a concept for the project's story is mapped out. Johnson referred to his repeated works with Peyton as his director, stating that he enjoys working with the filmmaker from a creative standpoint and looks forward to future collaborations. In December 2021, Hiram Garcia confirmed that Warner Bros. Pictures wants a sequel, while Seven Bucks Productions delayed development in favor of other projects.

== See also ==
- List of films based on video games
- List of films featuring space stations
