= Brad Peyton =

Canadian filmmaker (born 1978)

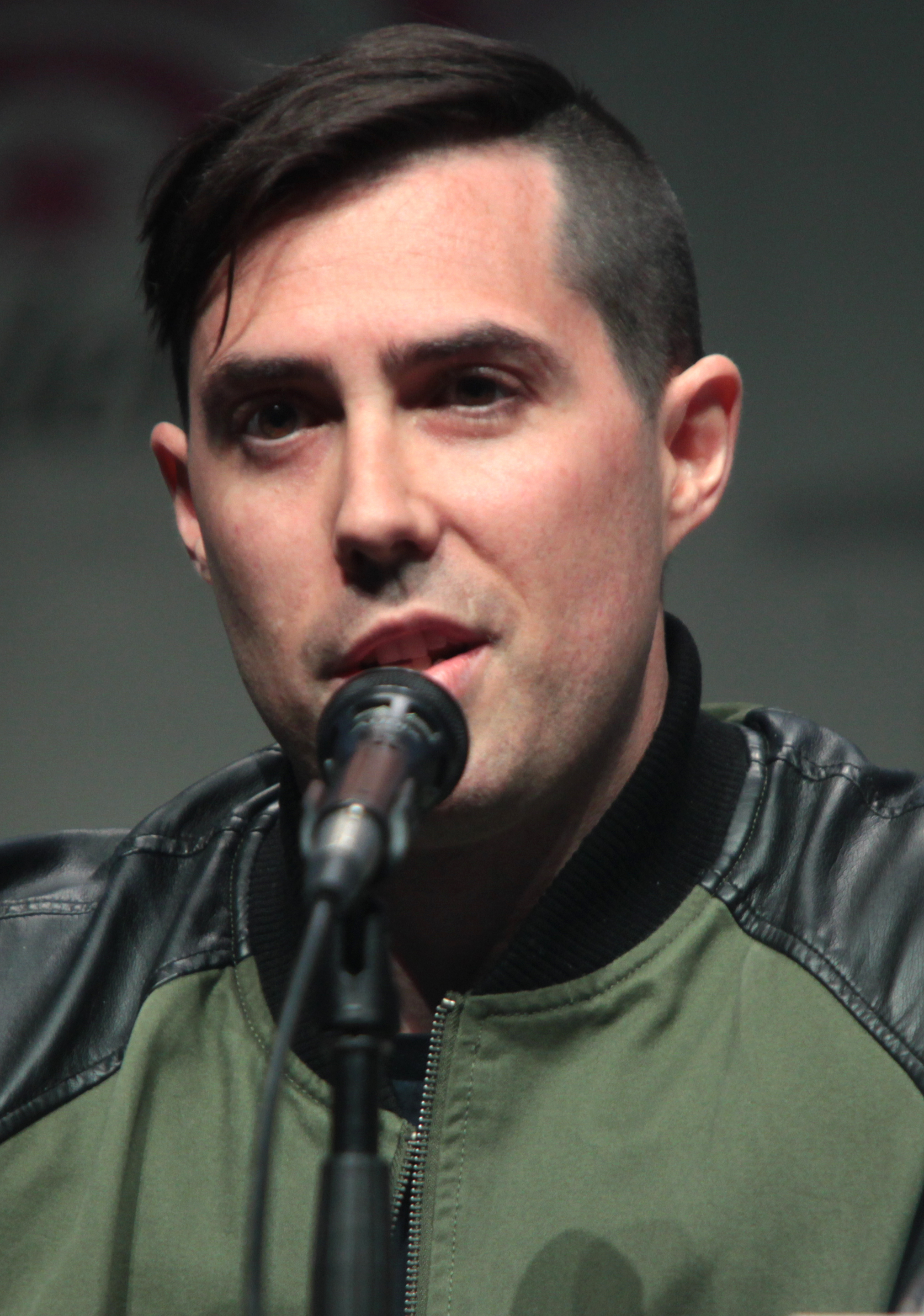
- Peyton at WonderCon 2015
- Born: May 27, 1978 (age 48); Gander, Newfoundland and Labrador, Canada
- Occupations: Film director; screenwriter; producer
- Years active: 1999–present

Brad Peyton (born May 27, 1978) is a Canadian filmmaker, best known for directing the Dwayne Johnson star vehicles Journey 2: The Mysterious Island (2012), San Andreas (2015), and Rampage (2018) as well as the Netflix series Daybreak (2019).

== Life and career ==
Peyton was born in Gander, Newfoundland and Labrador, Canada. He graduated from the Canadian Film Centre. He first gained fame with a short film and gothic comedy entitled Evelyn: The Cutest Evil Dead Girl (2002). The film was initially shown to Peyton's classmates, who clapped in approval. Filmmaker Jeremy Podeswa thus suggested Peyton should also show the film to a lawyer in the film industry in New York. This allowed the film to be distributed among the filmmaking elite. Evelyn also appeared in the Toronto International Film Festival in 2002.

He then created and produced the surreal claymation television series What It's Like Being Alone, which was picked up by the Canadian Broadcasting Corporation for one season in 2006. Reportedly, one of Peyton's mentors was US actor Tom Hanks.

Following Alone, Peyton went on to direct Cats and Dogs: The Revenge of Kitty Galore in 2010. In 2012, he directed the successful sequel to Journey to the Center of the Earth, entitled Journey 2: The Mysterious Island, which starred Dwayne Johnson and grossed $325.9 million. In 2015, Peyton directed the disaster film San Andreas, which also starred Johnson, and the horror film Incarnate.

Peyton directed the feature film adaptation Rampage (2018), starring Dwayne Johnson, marking their third collaboration. In June 2016 it was confirmed that he had signed on to direct the feature film adaptation of Malignant Man produced by James Wan. On February 10, 2017, it was reported that Peyton will direct, write and produce the upcoming disaster film, Black Hole, which will begin production in early 2018. In March 2017, it was reported that Peyton will be directing a film adaptation of the video game series Just Cause, with Jason Momoa set to star.

In July 2018, it was announced that Peyton was credited as an executive producer, writer, director and co-creator of the Netflix post-apocalyptic comedy series, Daybreak. The series premiered on October 24, 2019.

On February 6, 2025, it was announced that Peyton would serve as the director, writer, and producer for a live-action film based on the Bakugan series, collaborating with Spin Master Entertainment.

== Filmography ==
=== Short film ===
Year	Title	Director	Writer
2001	Ted	Yes	No
2001	Full	Yes	Yes
2001	Beyond the Fields	Yes	No
2002	Evelyn: The Cutest Evil Dead Girl	Yes	Yes
2004	Bad Luck	Yes	Yes
2004	A Tale of Bad Luck	Yes	Yes

=== Feature film ===
Year	Title	Director	Producer	Writer
2010	Cats & Dogs: The Revenge of Kitty Galore	Yes	No	No
2012	Journey 2: The Mysterious Island	Yes	No	No
2015	San Andreas	Yes	No	No
2016	Incarnate	Yes	No	No
2018	Rampage	Yes	Yes	No
2021	Sweet Girl	No	Yes	No
2024	Atlas	Yes	Yes	No
2027	The Kellys	Yes	Yes	Yes

Executive producer

- Suck (2009)
- Incarnate (2016)

=== Television ===
Year	Title	Director	Executive producer	Writer	Creator	Notes
2006	What It's Like Being Alone	No	Yes	No	Yes	
2013	Republic of Doyle	Yes	No	No	No	4 episodes
2014–2015	Dr. Dimensionpants	No	Yes	Yes	Yes	
2015	Pirate's Passage	No	No	Yes	No	TV movie, also producer
2016–2018	Frontier	Yes	Yes	No	No	
2019	Daybreak	Yes	Yes	Yes	Yes	
2020	Albedo	Yes	Yes	No	No	Miniseries

== Awards and nominations ==
Year	Title	Award/nomination
2002	Evelyn: The Cutest Evil Dead Girl	Nominated- Chicago International Film Festival for Best Short Film; Nominated- Genie Award for Best Live Action Short Drama
2017	Frontier	Nominated- Canadian Screen Awards for Best Direction in a Dramatic Series
