= Cats & Dogs (film series) =

- Official film series logo
- Distributed by: Warner Bros.
- Country: United States
- Language: English
- Budget: $162,000,000 (total of 3 films)
- Box office: $332,330,173 (total of 3 films)

The Cats & Dogs film series consists of spy-comedies, produced by Warner Bros. Entertainment, including two theatrical films, and one straight-to-home video release. Centered around a conflict of the ages between the titular species, the plot involves agents of two opposing covert operations agencies of rival animals. The teams of spies work together, unbeknownst to its human inhabitants.

The first film was met with mixed critical reception. Praise was directed at its watchability for an audience of all ages, as well as its concept, creativity and effective use of special effects. Overall it fared well at the box office. Conversely, the second installment was met with mostly negative critical reviews with criticism for its clichéd formulaic plot, while receiving praise for its "faster, funnier" nature, but was a box office flop. The third film was met with overwhelming negative reviews with criticism directed towards its story plot, its use of juvenile humor, poor CGI special effects, and unoriginality. Despite this, George Lopez's role in the story was noted as a redeeming contribution to the film. As the film was a straight-to-video release, its sales compared to its budget lost money for the studio.

== Film ==
| Title | U.S. release date | Director | Screenwriter(s) | Producers |
|---|---|---|---|---|
| Cats & Dogs | July 4, 2001 | Lawrence Guterman | John Requa & Glenn Ficarra | Christopher DeFaria, Andrew Lazar, Craig Perry & Warren Zide |
| Cats & Dogs: The Revenge of Kitty Galore | July 30, 2010 | Brad Peyton | Ron J. Friedman & Steve Bencich | Andrew Lazar & Polly Johnsen |
| Cats & Dogs 3: Paws Unite! | October 13, 2020 | Sean McNamara | Scott Bindley | Andrew Lazar & David Fliegel |

=== Cats & Dogs (2001) ===
A high-tech, secret war takes place throughout neighborhoods worldwide that human beings are not aware of stemming from an ancient rivalry between cats and dogs. When a Persian cat named Mr. Tinkles implements a plan to destroy a breakthrough vaccination that is intended to end all human allergies to man's best friend, a Beagle named Lou Brody is recruited by D.O.G., a discreet espionage organization of canines. Under the mentorship of Butch, an Anatolian Shepherd, Lou scrambles to foil the nefarious plans of Mr. Tinkles.

=== Cats & Dogs: The Revenge of Kitty Galore (2010) ===
Amongst generations of battles between cats and dogs, a Sphynx cat former agent of M.E.O.W.S. named Ivana Clawyu develops a diabolical plan against canines and her former feline collaborators, with a new alias of Kitty Galore. In defense of themselves and their humans, agents of separate spy organizations (D.O.G. and M.E.O.W.S.) team up in an unprecedented union to stop Galore from exacting her revenge on the world.

=== Cats & Dogs 3: Paws Unite! (2020) ===
An American Shorthair cat named Gwen and a Border Collie named Roger are spies covertly working together to defend the world and the unknowing humans. The partnership of cats and dogs comes from the Great Truce, which stopped the ancient rivalry between them for the last decade. A villainous mastermind cockatoo named Pablo seeks to destroy the long-standing truce, by Wirelessly manipulating frequencies that only the felines and canines can hear. Together, agents of F.A.R.T. (Furry Animals Rivalry Termination) work to stop the foul-play before it permanently separates the species.

== Primary cast and characters ==
List indicators

This section includes characters who will appear or have appeared in the franchise in main roles.

- An empty grey cell indicates the character was not in the film, or that the character's official presence has not yet been confirmed.
- ^{V} indicates a voice-only role.

| Character | Title | | |
| Character | Cats & Dogs | Cats & Dogs: The Revenge of Kitty Galore | Cats & Dogs 3: Paws Unite! |
|---|---|---|---|
| Louis "Lou" Brody | Tobey Maguire^{V} | Neil Patrick Harris^{V} | |
| Butch | Alec Baldwin^{V} | Nick Nolte^{V} | |
| Mr. Tinkles | Sean Hayes^{V} | Sean Hayes^{V} | |
| Ivy | Susan Sarandon^{V} | | |
| The Mastiff | Charlton Heston^{V} | | |
| Calico | Jon Lovitz^{V} | Wallace Shawn^{V} | |
| Dimitri Kennelkoff The Russian | Glenn Ficarra^{V} | | |
| Diggs | | James Marsden^{V} | |
| Catherine Agent 47 | | Christina Applegate^{V} | |
| Tab Lazenby | | Roger Moore^{V} | |
| Ivana Clawyu Kitty Galore | | Bette Midler^{V} | |
| Sam | Michael Clarke Duncan^{V} | Michael Clarke Duncan^{V} | |
| Roger | | | Max Greenfield^{V} |
| Gwen | | | Melissa Rauch^{V} |
| Pablo | | | George Lopez^{V} |
| Gruff K-9 | | J. K. Simmons^{V} | |
| Paws | | Phil LaMarr^{V} | |
| Scrumptious | | Elizabeth Daily^{V} | |
| Zeek | | | Paul Dobson^{V} |
| Duke | | | Michael Daingerfield^{V} |

== Additional crew and production details ==
| Film | Crew/Detail | | | | | |
| Film | Composer | Cinematographer | Editor(s) | Production companies | Distributing company | Running time |
|---|---|---|---|---|---|---|
| Cats & Dogs | John Debney | Julio Macat | Rick W. Finney & Michael A. Stevenson | Warner Bros. Pictures, Village Roadshow Pictures, NPV Entertainment, Mad Chance Productions, Zide/Perry Productions, BenderSpink Productions | Warner Bros. Pictures | 1hr 27mins |
| Cats & Dogs: The Revenge of Kitty Galore | Christopher Lennertz | Steven Poster | Julie Rogers | Village Roadshow Pictures, CD2 Films, Mad Chance Productions, Polymorphic Pictures | Warner Bros. Pictures | 1hr 22mins |
| Cats & Dogs 3: Paws Unite! | John Coda | Adam Sliwinski | Simon Davidson | Mad Chance, Creative BC | Warner Bros. Home Entertainment | 1hr 24mins |

== Reception ==
=== Box office and financial performance ===
| Film | Box office gross | | | Box office ranking | | Home video sales gross | Gross total income | Budget | Worldwide net total income | Ref(s) |
| Film | North America | Other territories | Worldwide | All-time North America | All-time worldwide | North America | Gross total income | Budget | Worldwide net total income | Ref(s) |
|---|---|---|---|---|---|---|---|---|---|---|
| Cats & Dogs | $93,385,515 | $107,324,849 | $200,710,364 | #813 | #892 | Figures not available | >$200,710,364 | $60,000,000 | >$140,710,364 | |
| Cats & Dogs: The Revenge of Kitty Galore | $43,585,753 | $69,440,630 | $113,026,383 | #2,001 | #1,374 | $12,844,122 | $125,870,505 | $85,000,000 | $40,870,505 | |
| Cats & Dogs 3: Paws Unite! | —N/a | $4,331,546 | $4,331,546 | #6,062 | #9,549 | $1,417,758 | $5,749,304 | $17,000,000 | -$11,250,696 | |
| Totals | $136,971,268 | $181,097,025 | $318,068,293 | x̅ #2,959 | x̅ #3,938 | >$14,261,880 | $332,330,173 | $162,000,000 | >$170,330,173 | |

=== Critical and public response ===
| Film | Rotten Tomatoes | Metacritic | CinemaScore | |
|---|---|---|---|---|
| Cats & Dogs | 54% (117 reviews) | 47/100 (26 reviews) | CinemaScore | —N/a |
| Cats & Dogs: The Revenge of Kitty Galore | 13% (99 reviews) | 30/100 (22 reviews) | B− | |
| Cats & Dogs 3: Paws Unite! | 11% (9 reviews) | TBD | —N/a | |
