= Blue cat =

Blue Cat may refer to:

- Russian Blue, a cat breed.
- Blue Cat Records, a record company.
- 3000 Whys of Blue Cat, the Chinese animation series, or its main character, Lan Mao.
- Dougal and the Blue Cat, a 1970 film based on the television programme The Magic Roundabout.
- In Cat coat genetics, a cat with a type of grey fur.
