= Cats and Dogs =

Cats and Dogs or variants may refer to:

== Film ==
- Cats and Dogs (1932 film), a short animated film
- Cats and Dogs (1952 film), an Italian comedy film
- Cats & Dogs (film series), Warner Bros spy-comedies
  - Cats & Dogs, a 2001 film
- Cat and Dog, a 1983 Italian comedy film

== Television ==
- Dog and Cat, a 1977 American TV series
- Dog × Cat, a 2007–2010 Japanese manga
- "Cats and Dogs" (Where the Heart Is), a 2001 television episode

== Music ==
- Cats & Dogs (Evidence album), 2011
- Cats & Dogs (Mental As Anything album), 1981
- Cats and Dogs (Royal Trux album), 1993
- Cats and Dogs (Talisman album), 2003
- Cats and Dogs: The Very Best of Mari Hamada, a 1998 compilation album

== Other uses ==
- "Raining cats and dogs", an English-language idiom to describe especially heavy rain
- Cats and Dogs (game) or Blue and Gray, a board game
- The Sims 4: Cats & Dogs, a 2017 expansion pack for the video game

== See also ==
- Cat–dog relationship
- CatDog, a 1998–2005 American television series
