= Ge Ping =

Ge Ping may refer to:

- Ge Ping (athlete), Chinese high jumper
- Ge Ping (voice actor), Chinese voice actor
