= Nebelung =

Breed of cat

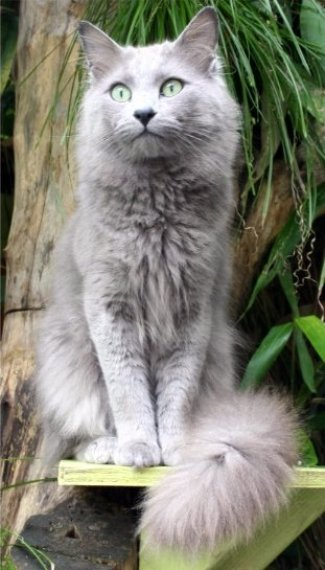
- Nebelung male
- Other names: Long-haired Russian Blue
- Origin: United States, Russia, the Netherlands
- Foundation bloodstock: Blue domestic longhair and Russian Blue cats

Breed standards
- TICA: standard
- WCF: standard
- ACF: standard
- ACFA/CAA: standard
- GCCF: standard
- LOOF: standard

The Nebelung is a pedigree breed of domestic cat. Nebelungs have long bodies, wide-set green eyes, long and dense solid blue-coloured fur, and mild dispositions. The Nebelung was developed to resemble the early blue-grey cats imported from Russia in the late 19th and early 20th centuries, combined with a semi-long coat. The cat is related to the Russian Blue, but with longer, silkier hair, and is in fact sometimes (incorrectly) called the Long-haired Russian Blue.

The breed holds full recognition with the ACF and TICA, and enjoys preliminary status with the GCCF. However, given the relatively recent foundation of the Nebelung in the 1980s, it has yet to gain recognition from the other major cat fancier organisations.

== Origin ==
=== Early origins ===
Longhaired blue cats resembling the Russian Blue were first exhibited at the first Cat shows held at the Crystal Palace in the UK in 1871, but disappeared from the spotlight in the early twentieth century as the cat fancy contracted.

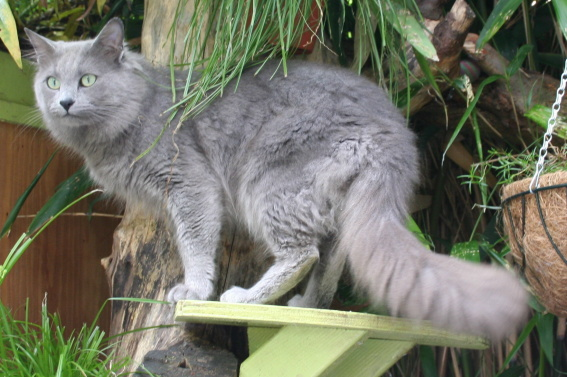
International Champion male adult born in the Netherlands to the offspring of founding cats Siegfried and Brunhilde from the US

=== Development in the US ===
The modern Nebelung was developed in the 1980s by Cora Cobb of Nebelheim Cattery in the US. The foundation cats were Siegfried (1984) and Brunhilde (1985), both longhaired blue kittens born to a black domestic shorthair, Elsa, and a blue domestic longhair male. Cobb, advised by TICA geneticist Dr Solveig Pflueger, drafted a standard based on the Russian Blue but with semi-long hair, naming the new breed Nebelung ("creature of the mist"; see Nibelung). Russian Blue breeders in TICA objected, and the standard was revised to describe a new distinct breed, achieving new breed status in TICA in 1987 and full championship in 1997.

=== Russian and European lines ===
In the early 1990s, longhaired kittens began to appear in Russia from Russian Blue parents, confirming the presence of the recessive longhair gene in the population. In 1993 a Dutch breeder, Letty van den Broeck, imported a Russian Blue male, Timofeus, from a Russian cattery. He proved to be semi-longhaired and became the first known longhaired Russian Blue stud in Western Europe. He demonstrated that the longhair gene was naturally present in the Russian Blue breed.

After this revelation, Cobb acquired Winterday Georgin of Nebelheim, a Nebelung male bred in Moscow by the Zimnij Denn cattery. These Russian Nebelung lines went on to produce many offspring, several of which won titles in cat championships worldwide. This exchange marked the consolidation of Russian and US Nebelung lines. Breeding spread in Western Europe in the early 2000s, supported by imports from both Russia and the US.

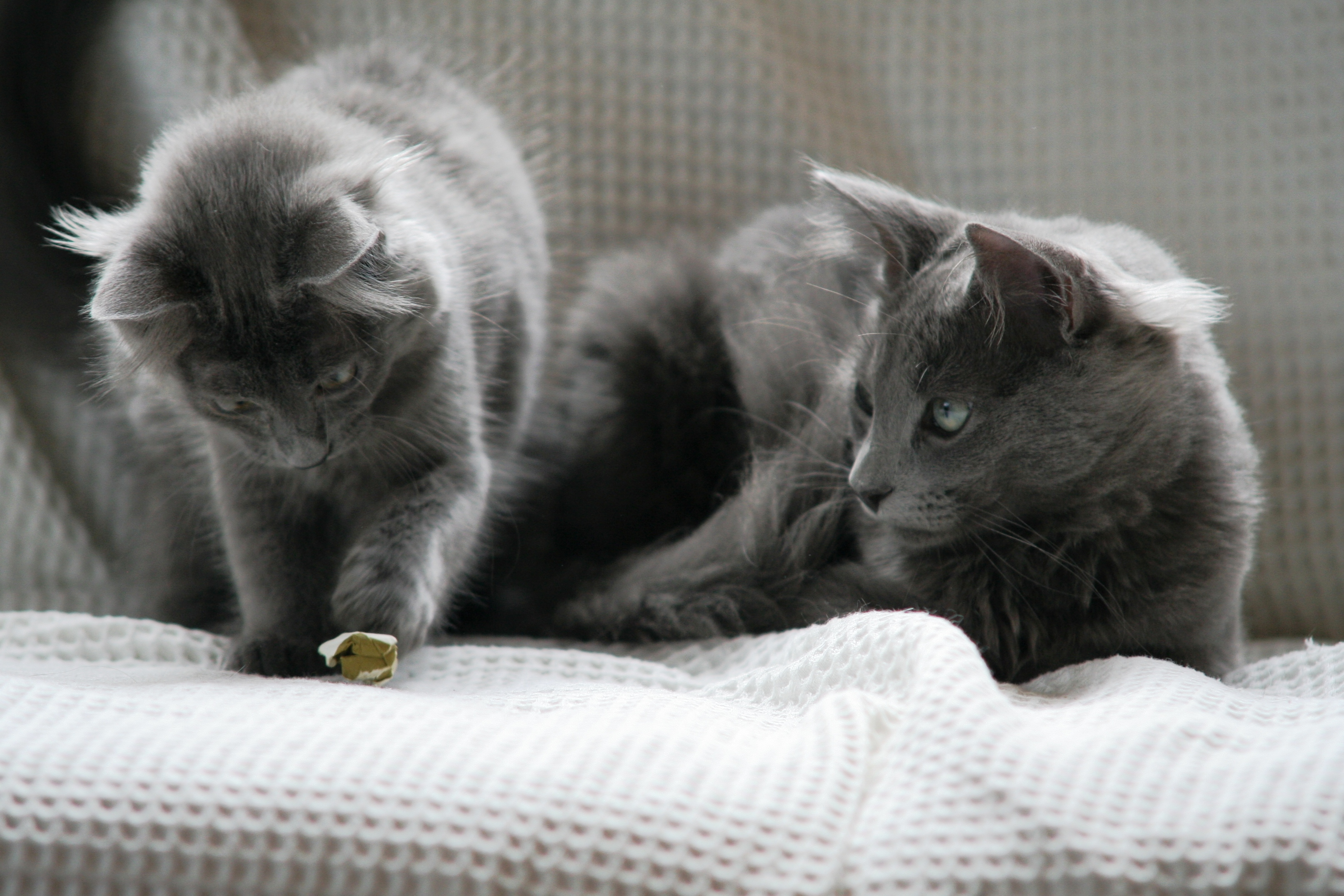
Two kittens

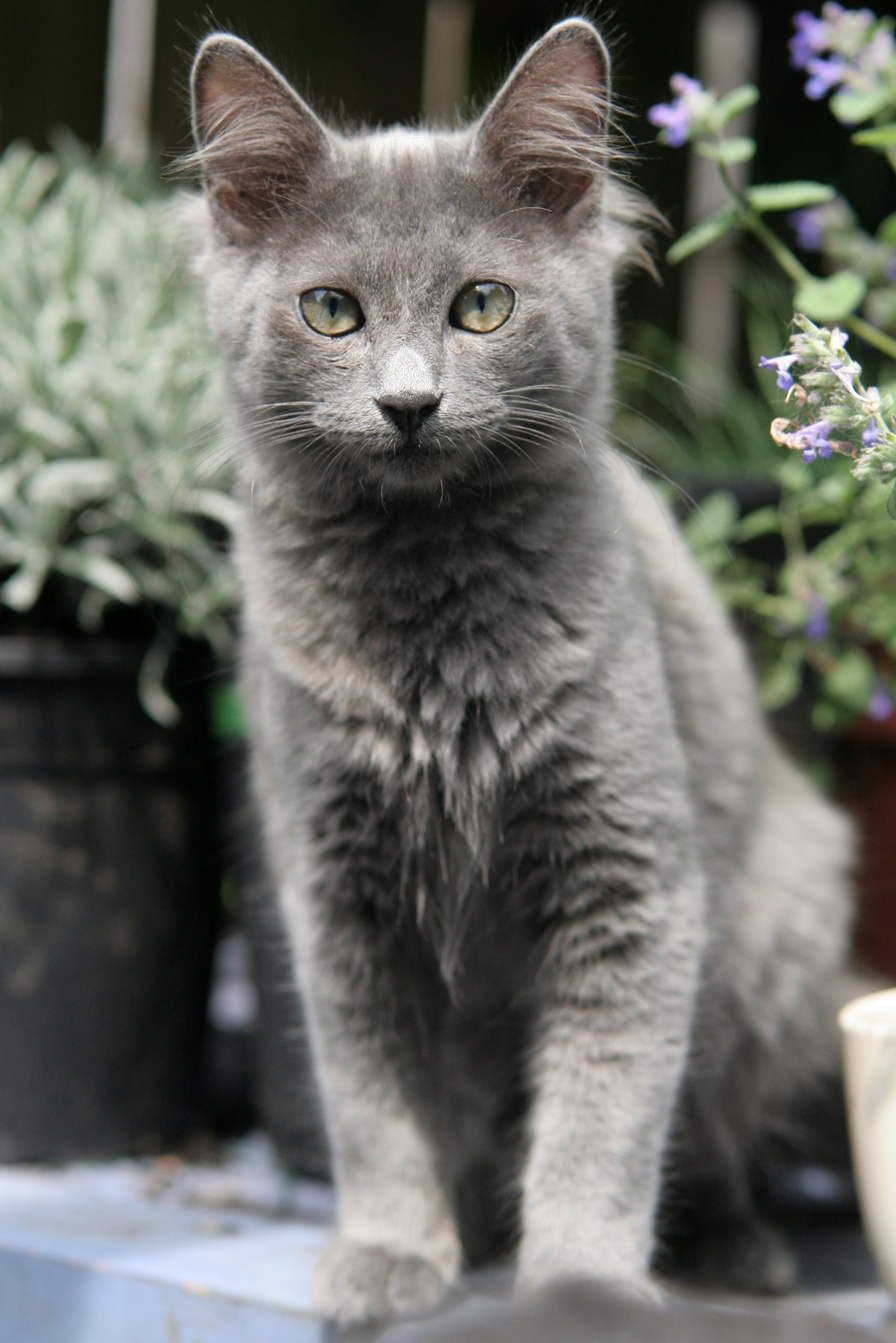
Young kitten

== Registration and popularity ==
The Nebelung is now recognised by several registries; the American Cat Fanciers Association (ACFA), Australian Cat Federation (ACF), Governing Council of the Cat Fancy (GCCF), Livre Officiel des Origines Félines (LOOF), The International Cat Association (TICA), and World Cat Federation (WCF). The Russian Blue is permitted as an outcross in most registries.

However, the Nebelung remains a relatively rare breed, with only a few active breeders worldwide as of 2025, predominantly in Europe and Russia, and a handful in Australia. (Note: The Nebelheim cattery of Cora Cobb was the first and last breeder active in the US, but has retired. All Nebelungs registered between 2015-2025 with the worldwide pedigree database PawPeds are born in European countries, Russia, and Australia. All World Cat Federation Best Cat ranking Nebelung cats are based in European countries and Russia.) In the UK, only 2–4 kittens were born in 2023–2024, whilst in France the breed is more popular with approx. 45 kittens registered each year in 2018–2022. However, they still only account for 0,07% of all French pedigree cats. Data from TICA, one of the largest cat registries globally, indicates that between 1979 and 2013, a total of just 413 Nebelung cats were registered with them. A total of 55 litters were officially documented and registered with the TICA between the years 1999 and 2009. The highest recorded number of litters was 15 in 2000, and between 2001 and 2009, a total of just 34 litters were registered, with only one litter being documented in 2008. During the 2008-2009 show season, a mere five Nebelung were exhibited. As of 2025, there are no Nebelung breeders listed by TICA.

== Characteristics ==
=== Physical characteristics ===
The Nebelung is a medium-sized cat of semi-foreign type, characterised by a long body, semi-long coat, and even blue solid colouring with a silver sheen. The head is a modified wedge with width at eye level, high cheekbones, and a straight profile forming a distinctive angle at the eyes. The whisker pads are prominent, the chin is strong and aligned vertically with the nose tip, and the ears are large, pointed, and set to continue the wedge. The eyes are wide-set, oval to almond in shape, and vivid green-coloured in adult cats; kittens may show yellow or mixed colours that typically develop into green as they mature.

The body is long, firm, and muscular, with medium to long legs, medium boning, and rounded paws showing tufting between the toes. The tail is proportionately long, tapering, and well-furnished. The coat is semi-long, soft, and silky, with a fine undercoat and longer guard hairs; seasonal variation occurs, with denser coats in winter and lighter coats in summer. Feathering behind the ears, pantaloons on the hind legs, and a ruff in males are commonly present.

The coat colour is an even medium solid blue, sound to the roots. Silver tipping on the guard hairs produces a characteristic sheen, although this may be less visible on parts of the body. Nose leather and paw pads are mauve-grey to pinkish-lavender in shade. An adult Nebelung weighs between 3.5–5 kg (8–11 lb) for females to 4.5–6.5 kg (10–14 lb) for males.
