= Cat–dog relationship =

Interaction between the main house pets

Cats and dogs have a range of interactions. The natural instincts of each species tends to lead towards antagonistic interactions, though individual animals can have non-aggressive relationships with each other, particularly under conditions where humans have socialized non-aggressive behaviors.

The generally aggressive interactions between the species have been noted in cultural expressions. In domestic homes where dogs and cats are reared and trained properly, they tend to relate well with each other, especially when their owner is taking good care of them.

== Range of relationships ==
The signals and behaviors that cats and dogs use to communicate are different and can lead to signals of aggression, fear, dominance, friendship or territoriality being misinterpreted by the other species. Dogs have a natural instinct to chase smaller animals that flee, an instinct also common among cats. Most cats flee from a dog, while others take actions such as hissing, arching their backs and swiping at the dog. After being scratched or bitten by a cat, most dogs will become fearful of cats.

If appropriately socialized, cats and dogs may have relationships that are not antagonistic, and dogs raised with cats may prefer the presence of cats to other dogs. Even cats and dogs in the same household that have historically had positive interactions may revert to aggressive reactions due to external stimuli, illness, or play that escalates and could eventually be harmful.

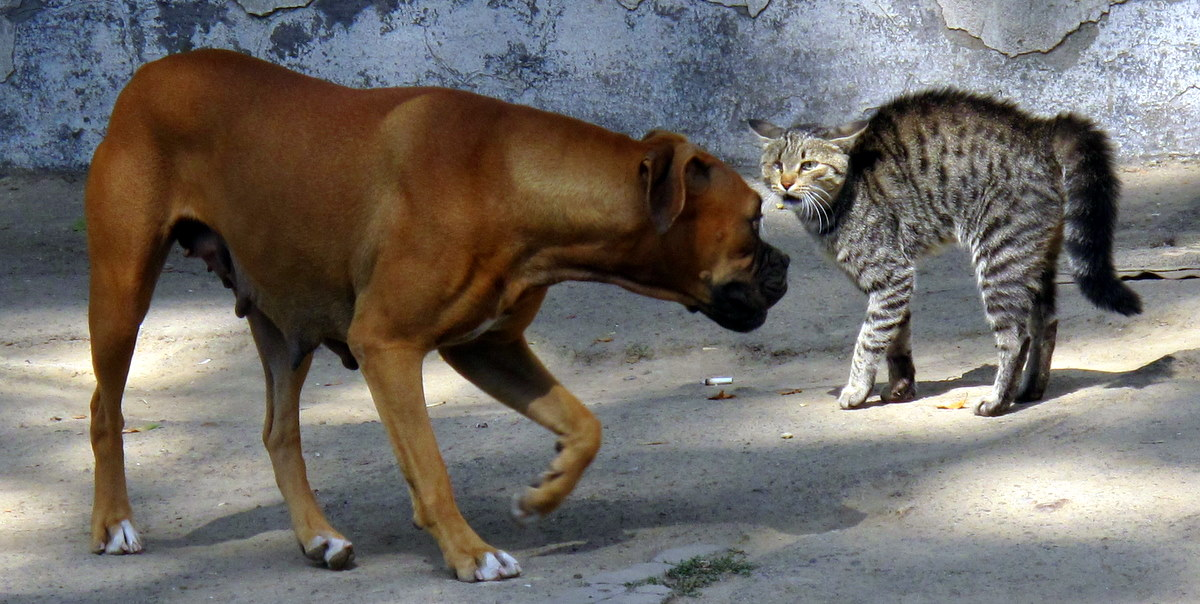
A dog and a cat face off. The cat is displaying a defensive posture typical of interactions between a cat and dog that have not been socialized.

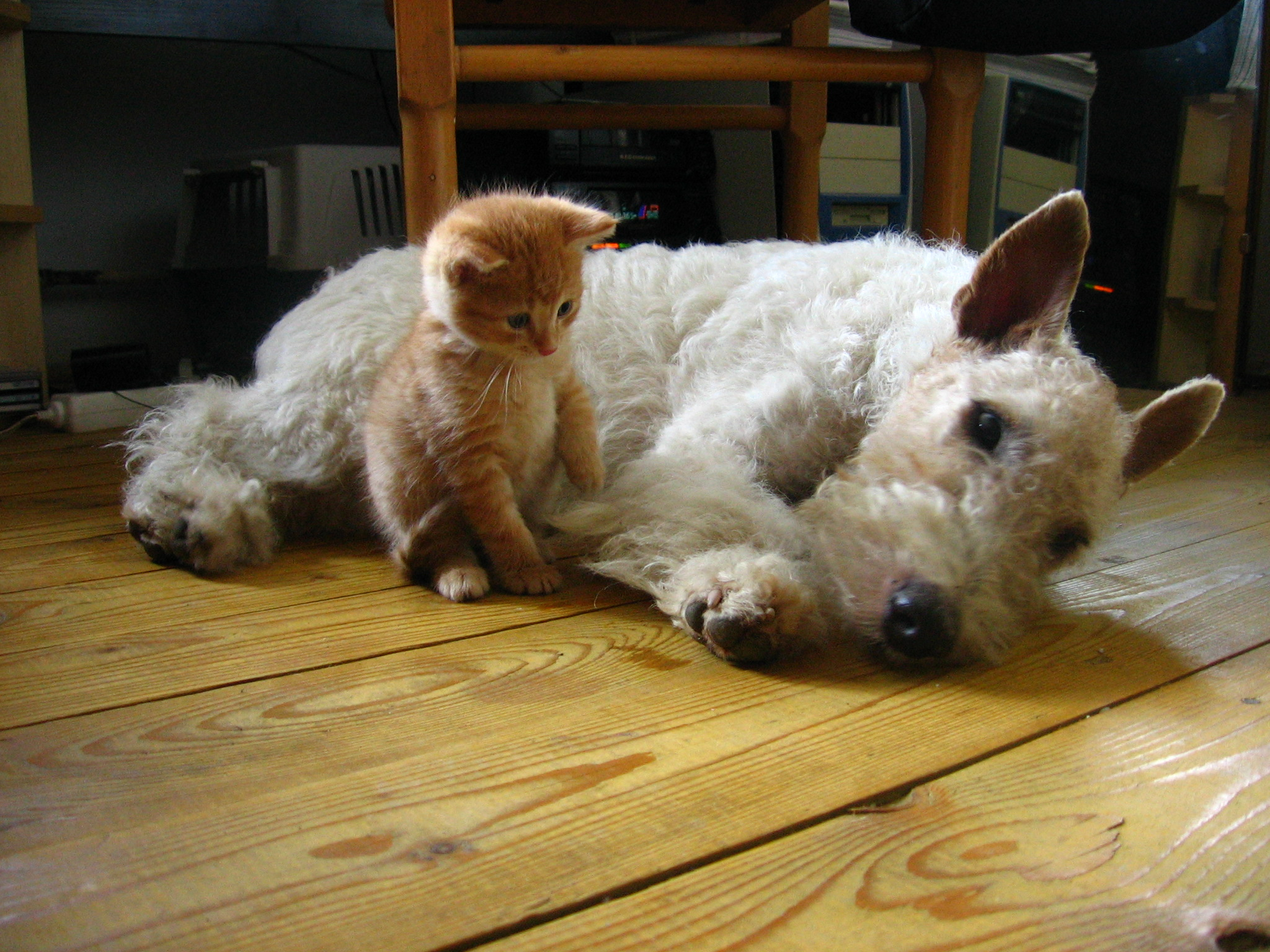
A kitten and a dog that have been socialized and are interacting with each other without aggression.

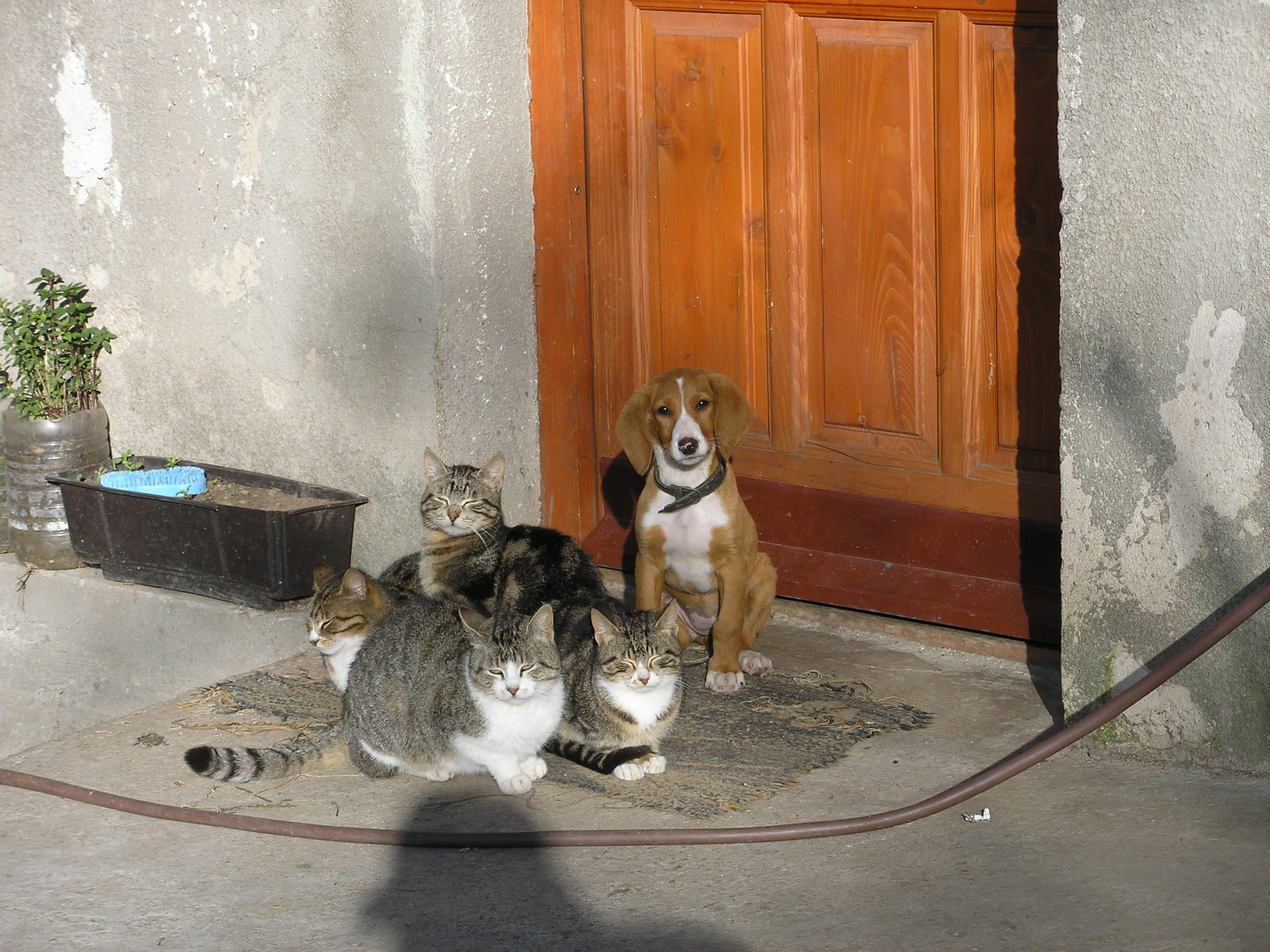
Four cats and a dog sitting together in front of a door.

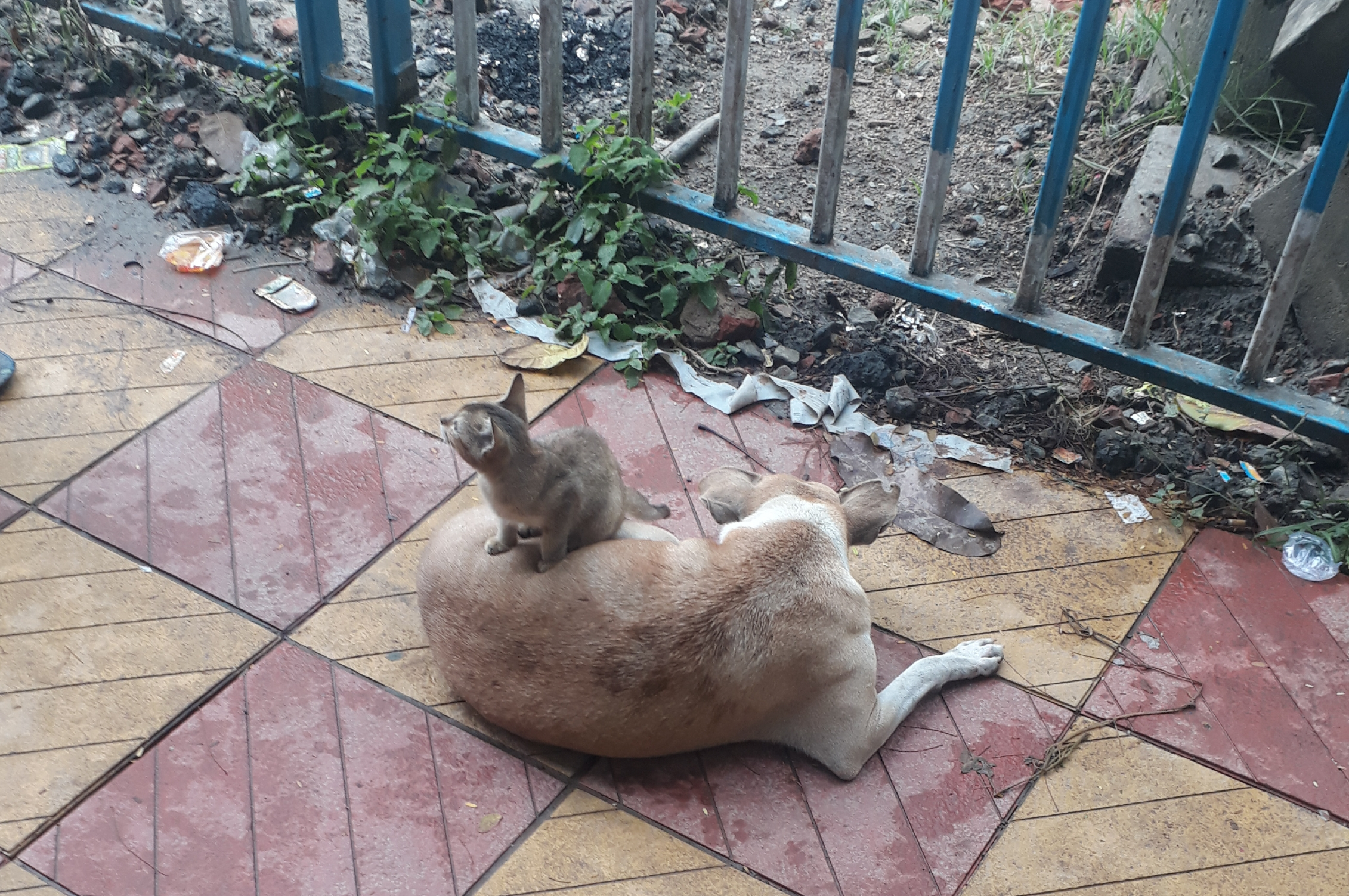
A kitten rests on the back of a street dog.

== Cultural impact ==
The phrase "fight like cats and dogs" reflects a natural tendency for the relationship between the two species to be antagonistic. Other phrases and proverbs include "The cat is mighty dignified until the dog comes by" and "The cat and dog may kiss, but are none the better friends."

Eugene Field's children's poem, "The Duel," projects and amplifies the real-life antipathy between cats and dogs onto a stuffed gingham dog and a stuffed calico cat who had an all-night fight during which they "ate each other up."

In Fam Ekman's children's book Kattens Skrekk (The Cat's Terror), a cat visits a museum to find that all of the artworks, like Mona Lisa and Venus de Milo, have been replaced by parodies featuring dogs. The only piece not converted is The Scream which "symbolizes the cat's terror in the face of so many dogs." The American animated television series CatDog features the adventures of the protagonist, CatDog, a genetically altered creature with the head of a dog on one end of its body and the head of a cat on the other. The episodes frequently play on "cats and dogs being what they are" to incorporate "a lot of running and chasing."

The comedy films Cats & Dogs (2001) and its sequel Cats & Dogs: The Revenge of Kitty Galore (2010) both project and amplify the above-mentioned antipathy between dogs and cats into an all-out war between the two species. Cats are shown as being out-and-out enemies of humans, whereas dogs are shown as being more sympathetic to humans.

Adlai Stevenson invoked the dog–cat conflict in his explanation of his veto as Governor of Illinois of a 1949 act that would have barred owners from allowing their cats to run at large: "That cats destroy some birds, I well know, but I believe this legislation would further but little the worthy cause to which its proponents give such unselfish effort. The problem of cat versus bird is as old as time. If we attempt to resolve it by legislation, who knows but what we may be called upon to take sides as well in the age-old problems of dog versus cat, bird versus bird, even bird versus worm."

The Tom and Jerry cartoons contain multiple instances of conflict between the titular character Tom the cat and Spike the bulldog. The series exploits this antagonistic dog–cat relationship by having Jerry create scenarios for Tom to clash with Spike as means for Jerry's escape.

== See also ==
- Interspecies friendship
- Human–canine bond
- Human interaction with cats
