= Ge Ping (voice actor) =

Chinese voice actor

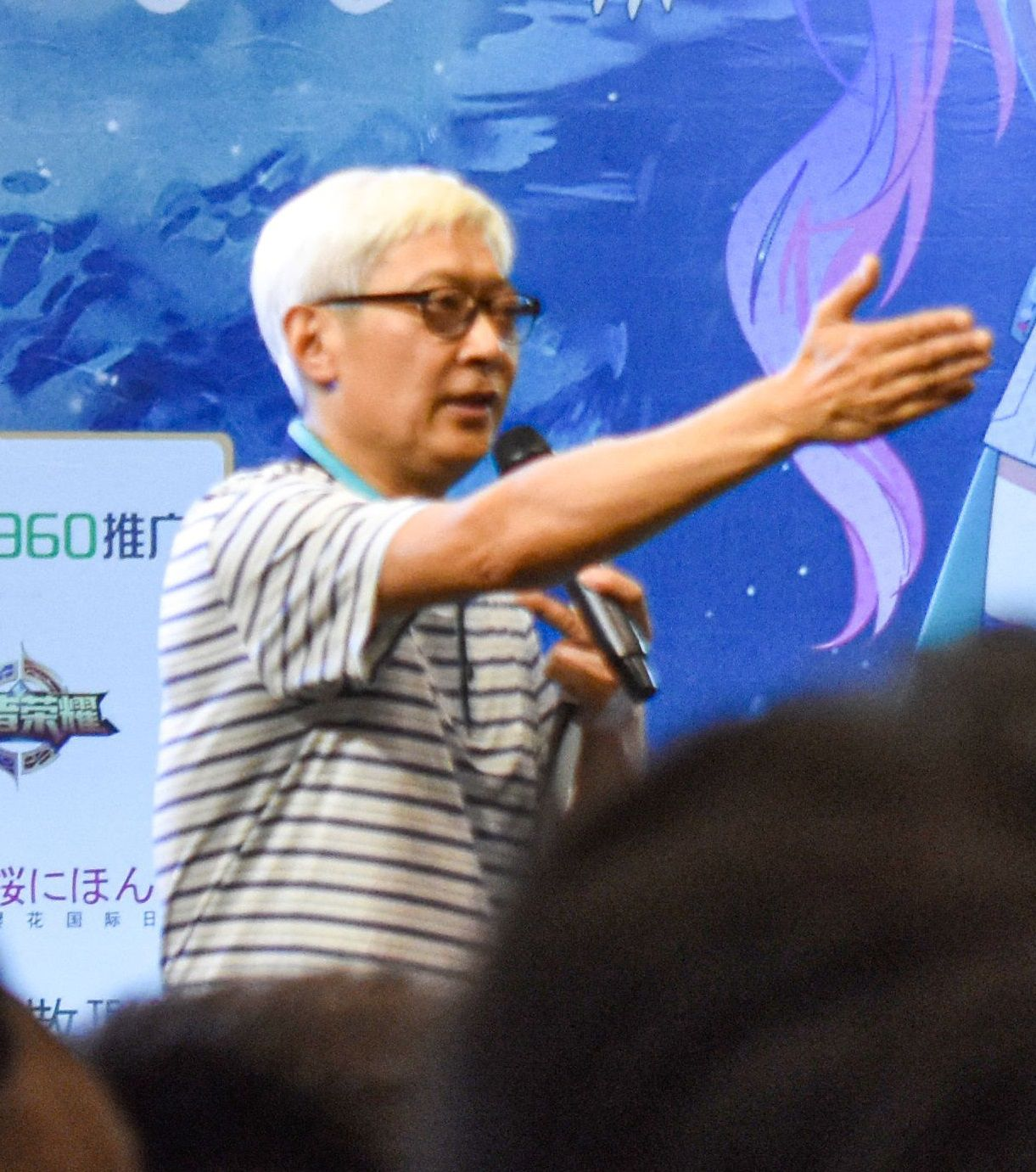
- Ge Ping on August 5, 2018.
- Born: 4 June 1960 (age 66); Changsha, Hunan, China
- Occupation: Actor
- Agent: Sanchen Cartoon Co Ltd (三辰卡通集团有限公司)
- Notable work: 3000 Whys of Blue Cat as Blue Cat
- Website: Ge Ping on Weibo (in Chinese)

Ge Ping (Chinese: 葛平; born 4 June 1960) is a Chinese voice and television actor who graduated from Wuhan Conservatory of Music. He was best known for the role of Blue Cat in 3000 Whys of Blue Cat, an animation series known to and beloved by many children born in the 1990s. Since 2009, Ge Ping became famous due to MAD parodies made by netizens in China, stemming from a video from the past of Ge Ping addressing little viewers of the show. Many parodies create humor by the use of vulgar or sexual language, which outraged many fans of Ge Ping. However, there are also videos that seek to be inspirational; Ge Ping himself approved this type of parody, announcing that he would like to be the "foundation stone" for creative youngsters to step on.
