= The Monkey King (2023 film) =

Animated film by Anthony Stacchi

- Promotional poster
- Directed by: Anthony Stacchi
- Screenplay by: Steve Bencich; Ron J. Friedman; Rita Hsiao
- Produced by: Peilin Chou
- Starring: Jimmy O. Yang; Bowen Yang; Jo Koy; BD Wong; Jolie Hoang-Rappaport; Stephanie Hsu
- Edited by: Pam Ziegenhagen
- Music by: Toby Chu
- Production companies: Netflix Animation Studios; Pearl Studio
- Distributed by: Netflix
- Release dates: July 30, 2023 (NYAFF); August 18, 2023 (Netflix)
- Running time: 96 minutes
- Countries: United States; China; Hong Kong
- Languages: English; Mandarin

The Monkey King is a 2023 animated fantasy action comedy film directed by Anthony Stacchi from a screenplay written by Rita Hsiao and the writing team of Steve Bencich and Ron J. Friedman. It is based on the first 7 chapters of the classic Ming dynasty novel, Journey to the West, and co-produced by the United States, China, and Hong Kong. The film stars Jimmy O. Yang as the voice of the titular trickster, with Bowen Yang, Jo Koy, BD Wong, Jolie Hoang-Rappaport, and Stephanie Hsu in supporting roles.

The Monkey King was selected as the closing film at the 22nd New York Asian Film Festival, where it had its world premiere on July 30, 2023, and was distributed and released on August 18, 2023, by Netflix. It received mixed reviews from critics, who praised the animation and action sequences, but criticized the screenplay, humor and unlikable main character. On December 7, it appeared in the eligible list for consideration of Academy Award for Best Animated Feature for the 96th Academy Awards, but ultimately it was not nominated.

== Plot ==
One night, a monkey is born from a stone atop a tall mountain and disturbs the Jade Emperor. He gives the order to eliminate the infant, but Buddha appears before him and tells him to let him find his purpose. Monkey finds a troop of other monkeys, but his unruly nature keeps him from fitting in. One of his escapades causes a feared demon to pounce from his mountain lair and grab one of the troop's infants for food; as a result, Monkey is banished.

To prove his worth, he trains to fight the demon. After many years, when he deems himself ready, he confronts the demon in the middle of snatching another infant, but his training proves ineffective. To fetch a more suitable weapon, Monkey dives into the sea realm of the Dragon King, who is about to use a glowing column to eradicate all life on the world's surface. Communicating with the column, Monkey turns it into a staff and escapes. Monkey returns to the demon's lair, defeats him, and rescues the infant. Prompted by the grateful troop, he crowns himself King of the Monkeys, but the troop's elder cautions that his staff should only be used by the gods, so the new Monkey King decides to kill 100 demons, thus gaining the right to become a god.

Eventually, he comes to a village terrorized by the Red Girl. With the endorsement of a girl named Lin, Monkey King defeats Red Girl, but the Dragon King arrives during the victory celebration to reclaim his prized weapon. After fighting him, Monkey King leaves the village; Lin, pledging herself as his assistant, tags along, even though he treats her condescendingly. Unknown to him, Lin is helping the Dragon King reclaim the staff in return for saving her drought-stricken village.

In a graveyard, Monkey King opens a portal to Hell to get to the Archive of Souls and strike his name off his Scroll of Life and Death, thus gaining immortality. King Yama, the ruler and chief judge of Hell, recognizes them as outsiders and fights them. Monkey King succeeds in erasing his name, but is only made ageless. He steals Yama's Book of Everlasting Life and learns he must eat a peach from the Orchard of Everlasting Life to gain full immortality. The Dragon King subtly guides Monkey King and Lin to a peach tree laced with an intoxicating poison, but ends up getting fed one himself, foiling the plan.

After realizing the peaches are fake, Monkey King learns from the book that Wangmu, the divine Queen Mother, brews an immortality elixir for the gods. He and Lin infiltrate the Jade Palace's pharmacy to create a sample of the elixir. Wangmu catches them in the act, but Monkey King consumes the potion, thus becoming fully immortal. Although Lin has several chances to steal the staff, she repeatedly returns to help Monkey King, who also demonstrates that despite his rude behavior, he cares about her too. Monkey King and Lin flee the Heavens, and in a following heart-to-heart, Lin admits that she longs to make a difference in the world and tries encouraging Monkey King to do the same.

When Monkey King remains aloof and boisterous, Lin outwits him and delivers the staff to the Dragon King. The Dragon King reneges on his deal and prepares to drown the world in a mega-storm, but Monkey King challenges and attacks him. Realizing her mistake, Lin enables Monkey King to beat the Dragon King, but Monkey King becomes power-drunk, and Buddha prepares to intervene. Wanting to give Monkey King another chance, Lin is allowed to act as Buddha's voice and challenges Monkey King to leap off Buddha's hand to win rulership over Heaven, or else suffer a period of penance. Monkey King fails and is imprisoned in a mountain. Before the mountain is fully closed off, Lin is allowed to say goodbye to Monkey King, who finally admits how important Lin has become to him. She leaves him his staff for company.

Five hundred years later, Monkey King is freed from his prison by a monk, a pig, and a river spirit at Buddha's behest. They invite him to join them on a journey to the West, to which he over-happily agrees.

== Voice cast ==
- Jimmy O. Yang as Monkey King
  - Dee Bradley Baker as Baby Monkey King
- Jolie Hoang-Rappaport as Lin
- Bowen Yang as Dragon King
- Jo Koy as Benbo
- Nan Li as Stick
- Stephanie Hsu as Mayor's Wife
- BD Wong as Buddha
- Ron Yuan as Babbo
- Hoon Lee as Jade Emperor
- Andrew Pang as Mayor
- Andrew Kishino as King Yama
- Jodi Long as Wangmu
- James Sie as Elder Monkey
- Sophie Jean Wu as Red Girl

== Production ==
=== Development ===
In October 2017, Oriental DreamWorks, now known as Pearl Studio, announced the film with Steve Bencich and Ron J. Friedman as writers, but it didn't materialize. Later, on May 20, 2021, the film was announced by Netflix, with Peilin Chou as producer, Stephen Chow as executive producer, and Anthony Stacchi as director. Jimmy O. Yang, Bowen Yang, Jolie Hoang-Rappaport, Jo Koy, Ron Yuan, Hoon Lee, Stephanie Hsu, Andrew Pang, Andrew Kishino, Jodi Long, James Sie, and BD Wong were cast to voice the film's characters.

=== Animation ===
Reel FX was initially tasked with the film's animation, but work was subsequently transferred to Tangent Animation. However, by August 4, 2021, Tangent Animation shut down, with work on the film halting as well. Netflix was reportedly displeased with Tangent's work, so Reel FX's facilities in Montreal took over the production.

=== Music ===
The soundtrack of the film was composed by Toby Chu and featured two songs by Toby Marlow and Lucy Moss.

== Release ==
The Monkey King was selected as the closing film at the 22nd New York Asian Film Festival, where it had its world premiere on July 30, 2023. It had a preview at the Annecy International Animation Film Festival on June 14, 2023.

It premiered on Netflix on August 18, 2023.

== Reception ==
On the review aggregator website Rotten Tomatoes, 59% of 46 critics' reviews are positive, with an average rating of 5.7/10. The website's consensus reads: "Often rousing, The Monkey King is an animated blur of tried-and-true -- but still appealing -- archetypes." Metacritic, which uses a weighted average, assigned the film a score of 59 out of 100, based on 10 critics, indicating "mixed or average" reviews.

Amy Nicholson of The New York Times wrote, "The visuals are so frenetic that they can seem thoughtless." Nicholson further said, "One needs Zen-like focus to appreciate the animators' skillful use of angles and space". Leslie Felperin reviewing for The Guardian rated the film with 3 stars out of 5 and wrote, "Bounces along energetically, and has some exceptionally fun frills around the edges..." David Rooney of The Hollywood Reporter described the film as "a light and bouncy cultural crossover," and wrote, "Some aspects of the cross-cultural mashup work better than others, but overall, this is a charming attempt to distill a centuries-old story into a quirky folktale that all children can enjoy."

== See also ==
- List of submissions for the Academy Award for Best Animated Feature
