= Cats & Dogs 3: Paws Unite! =

2020 film directed by Sean McNamara

- Theatrical release poster
- Directed by: Sean McNamara
- Written by: Scott Bindley
- Based on: Characters by John Requa and Glenn Ficarra
- Produced by: Andrew Lazar; David Fliegel
- Starring: Melissa Rauch; Max Greenfield; George Lopez
- Cinematography: Adam Sliwinski
- Edited by: Simon Davidson
- Music by: John Coda
- Production companies: Mad Chance; Creative BC
- Distributed by: Warner Bros. Home Entertainment (United States); Warner Bros. Pictures (worldwide)
- Release date: September 15, 2020
- Running time: 84 minutes
- Country: United States
- Language: English
- Box office: $5.3 million

Cats & Dogs 3: Paws Unite! is a 2020 American spy comedy film directed by Sean McNamara. It is a stand-alone sequel to Cats & Dogs: The Revenge of Kitty Galore (2010) and is the third and final installment in the Cats & Dogs film series. Starring the voices of Melissa Rauch, Max Greenfield, and George Lopez, it is the only film that does not feature any cast members from the previous installments.

Unlike the first two installments, Paws Unite! was released straight to video in the United States on September 15, 2020. It is the only film in the Cats & Dogs film series not co-produced by Village Roadshow Pictures (which Village Roadshow Entertainment Group's library, including the first two installments, later sold to Alcon Entertainment for $417.5 million on June 18, 2025).

== Plot ==
A Border Collie named Roger and a cat named Gwen are two F.A.R.T. (Furry Animals Rivalry Termination) secret agents, who covertly protect and save the world without humans ever finding out. Their partnership is due to the Great Truce, which has stopped dog and cat hostility for a decade. Roger used to be a field agent, now he works at his desk. They both live in the same building in the suburbs of Seattle as their owners Max and Zoe. Max is a middle school tennis player who's under pressure from his mother to win a state championship. Zoe is the daughter of a struggling musician named Ollie, and they're being evicted because he hasn't been able to pay the rent.

Roger and Gwen are ordered by their superior Old Ed, a Golden Retriever to investigate a plot that would threaten the truce between cats and dogs. Roger, Gwen, and Old Ed recruit their neighbor dog Duke, a Rottweiler to help them investigate, so they patrol the neighborhood while their comms are down, and a dog in the park tells them that the alley cats might know something.

Roger admits that he quit being a field agent when his mentor got hurt while he and Gwen find the alley cats, and one of them admits to doing a covert mission by sneaking into a wireless phone company and getting Wi-Fi and cellular access codes off their computers, and they realize that someone is trying to manipulate wireless frequencies that only cats and dogs can hear, so they can be manipulated into conflict, which would mean that humans would only adopt reptiles, snakes, and birds.

Roger and Gwen both admit that Max and Zoe do not have time for them anymore and they do not have any other friends, they really just pass each other in the building and ride the elevator together. So they plan to hook them up by hiding their phones in their apartments so they will forget them when they leave. When Max enters the elevator for his next tennis match, Zoe enters the elevator and Gwen shuts down the power to the elevator, trapping them inside while their pets encounter the mastermind behind the evil plot, Pablo the Cockatoo, and they find Old Ed trapped in an ice cream truck, who tells them that Pablo is at the pet store.

While trapped, Max and Zoe start to open up to each other, and Max confesses to Zoe about the pressure that his mother puts him under to win tennis matches, and Zoe tells him to "chill, chill, and chill", while confessing to being evicted and to helping her dad write a song to keep them at home, and Max encourages her to play the song for him, which she does. Then someone comes to turn on the elevator and they thank each other for opening up to one another and they kiss just as the elevator comes back on. They go back to Max's apartment where he discovers Roger is gone, so he uses the GPS on his collar to find him at the pet store.

When Roger and Gwen arrive at the pet store, they encounter Pablo and his minion Snarky the Tarantula scares Duke into surrendering and he, Roger, and Gwen are trapped in boxes and Pablo has his minions activate the wireless frequency, which Max and Zoe hear as they enter the store, and Pablo orders snakes to attack Roger. But Duke breaks out of his trap and saves him and releases Gwen. Then a boy meets Pablo and pets him and starts to see the error of his ways. But his minion, Zeek the Tegu Lizard locks everyone in the store and uses the frequency on Pablo. Gwen fights the snakes, Duke squashes the spider, and Roger attacks Zeek and Pablo takes the phone to shut down the frequency, freeing Max and Zoe from the noise. Old Ed is revealed to be Roger's mentor and admits to being kidnapped on purpose so Roger could save him because he knew he was a good field agent, and he and Gwen go to Zoe's where they reunite with their owners.

Zoe plays her dad's finished song for him, which he enjoys and he's able to sell it and save themselves from eviction. Max uses Zoe's "chill, chill, and chill" advice to win his next match and the championship. The boy at the pet store adopts Pablo and Zeek (although Zeek is trapped in an iron dog suit), and Roger and Gwen spend more time outdoors with Max and Zoe, who are closer than ever.

== Cast ==
- Callum Seagram Airlie as Max Harper
- Kirsten Robek as Susan Harper
- Sarah Giles as Zoe
- John Murphy as Ollie
- Michael Daingerfield as News Reporter
- Princess Davis as Student Reporter
- Kareem Malcolm as Coach
- Andy Thompson as Paw Street Market Manager
- Matt Afonso as Store Clerk/Slacker Employee
- James Rha as Veterinarian
- Pauline Newstone as Sis
- Ryan Jefferson Booth as Maintenance Man
- Natalie Von Rotsburg as Pablo's New Mom
- Teague Higgins as Terrified Teen
- Akiz Aguma as Lost Little Boy
- Maya Victoria Mateo as Kid 1
- Ava Kelders as Kid 2
- Jojo Ahenkorah as Record Executive

=== Voice cast ===
- Max Greenfield as Roger, a Border Collie
- Melissa Rauch as Gwen, an American Shorthair cat
- George Lopez as Pablo, a cockatoo who is the film's main antagonist
- Paul Dobson as Zeek, a red tegu who is Pablo's nemesis
- Garry Chalk as Old Ed, a Golden Retriever
- Sunni Westbrook as Snarky
- Christina Meredith Lewall as Shaggy Dog
- Michael Daingerfield as Duke, a Rottweiler who speaks in a high pitched voice
- Megan Peta Hill as Siri
- Noel Johansen as Schnauzer
- Ian Hanlin as K9 Shepherd, a German Shepherd
- Andrea Libman as Fish
- Ingrid Nilson as Shelly
- Edwin Perez as Other Dogs 1 and 2

== Production ==
By 2010, a third Cats & Dogs film was revealed to be in the works. Not much was heard about the sequel until January 2020 when filming began in Los Angeles and Vancouver, Canada.

== Release ==
The film was released digitally on September 15, 2020 and on DVD and on Blu-ray on October 13 in the United States in contrast to the first two films, which were released theatrically. It was, however, given a theatrical release in other countries.

== Reception ==
On the review aggregator website Rotten Tomatoes, 11% of nine critics' reviews are positive, with an average rating of 3.3/10. Reviewing for The Guardian, Leslie Felperin gave a rating of three stars from five with criticism of the CGI effects and lack of wit. Jack Bottomley for Starburst magazine gave one star from five, criticising the story as cliched, as well as a lack of energy, poor CGI, and a deficient sense of humour. He commented that the film " ... is a pavement foul of a trilogy closer ...". The Times critic Kevin Maher felt that the plot was " ... grim and preachy ...", giving a score of one star from five. For The Herald Sun, Leigh Paatsch criticised the plot as generic and commented that the film was only suitable for "... early prime schoolers...", giving a score of 2 stars from five. Jennifer Green of Common Sense Media gave a rating of three stars from five, praising some of the humour, particularly from comedian George Lopez.
