= Russian White, Black, and Tabby =

Breeds of domestic cat

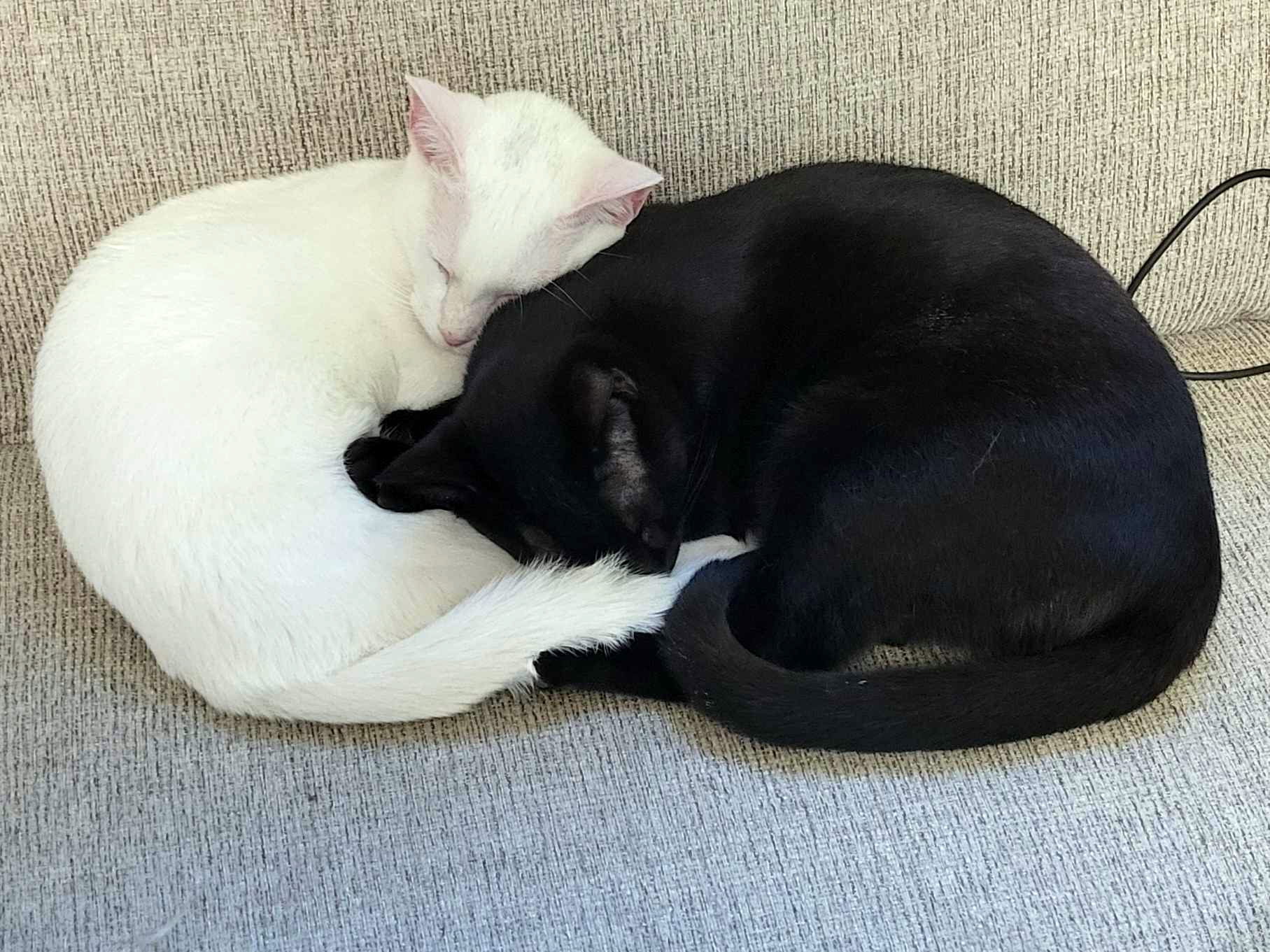
- A purebred Russian White and Russian Black cat sleeping together

The Russian White, Russian Black, and Russian Tabby are breeds of cat created in 1971, derived from the Russian Blue.

== History ==
In the UK, Frances McLeod of Arctic began breeding Russian Whites and Russian Blacks in the 1960s.

In Australia, The Russian White program started on the 4 May 1971 by Dick and Mavis Jones of Myemgay Cattery.

Our project began in earnest when we acquired a genuine white Siberian cat, albeit a "domestic", as she possessed no pedigree. She was the family pet of an official at the Thai Embassy, who brought her to Australia with him. We exchanged a Russian Blue for this beautiful white cat, and mated her to one of our Russian Blue studs. She produced two white kittens in her litter, the best of which we kept, and named White Rose, then applied for permission to breed White Russians. To our knowledge, the white cat from Russia or Siberia, is the only cat suitable to cross with a Russian Blue. White Rose grew to be a beautiful white queen, long, svelte, elegant, with all the appearances, and the charming characteristics of the Russian Blues.

Eventually we mated Rose back to her sire, Myemgay Yuri, who had already established quite a reputation for himself, as best shorthair stud cat for two successive years. Our two first generation White Russian kittens were registered in November 1971. They were exquisite and we were delighted.

Sadly Rose developed milk fever when her babies were three weeks old, and we lost her. We raised the two wee girls with a dolls bottle and carnation milk, until they were old enough to digest solid food.

It would take far too long to enumerate all the difficulties and incidents that "happen" in a programme such as ours. Suffice to say they were many and varied, but we accepted them as they came, and managed to overcome most. Of course there were some heartaches, but we accepted those too.

We mated our two first generation whites to two different Myemgay Blue Studs to produce our second generation whites and then two of the best whites (one from each litter) to produce our third generation kitten. We continued this procedure until we reached fourth generation and applied for full registration and recognition of our whites. They were granted full registration, eligible to compete for Championship status in July 1975.

— by Mavis Jones

=== Breeding program ===
The white "Siberian cat" – which may have been of Siberian breed or simply and unpedigreed cat from Siberia – was mated to Myemgay Yuri, a blue male. She produced two white kittens, the best was kept and named White Rose (female) and this cat was the foundation female for the Russian White.

White Rose was mated back to Myemgay Yuri producing two first generation White Russian kittens. The only line of whites from this mating that we are aware of is Myemgay Arctic Girl (female) the first generation Russian White.

She was mated to Myemgay Little Lemon (blue) and produced Myemgay Arctic Star (female 2nd generation Russian White). Arctic Star was mated back to Myemgay Yuri (blue) and produced Myemgay Arctic Snowflake (female 3rd generation Russian White). Arctic Snowflake was mated to Eastern Ninotchka (blue) and produced Myemgay Arctic Kosack (male 4th generation Russian White).

At this time, no Russian Whites had left Myemgay Cattery as the Royal Agricultural Society (RAS) Cat Club of New South Wales only fully registered cats when they reached the 4th generation. Up to this stage, they had been on the provisional register.

== Breed recognition ==
Today the Russian White is fully recognised in Australia, New Zealand, and South Africa and exists in various stages of recognition in the United Kingdom, many countries in mainland Europe, and the United States.

Full register status was given by RAS in November 1975. In 2010 the American Cat Fanciers Association (ACFA) recognised the Russian Black and Russian White for championship status. ACFA Russian Shorthair Standard

== See also ==
- Russian Blue
