= Steve Bencich =

American screenwriter and film director (born 1970)

- Born: Steven Lawrence Bencich; October 31, 1970 (age 55); San Francisco, California, U.S.
- Occupations: Screenwriter, film director
- Years active: 1994–present

Steven Lawrence Bencich (born October 31, 1970) is an American screenwriter and film director best known for his work with writing partner Ron J. Friedman.

Bencich and Friedman have collaborated on screenplays for several animated films, including Brother Bear, Chicken Little, and Open Season. DreamWorks has purchased their comedy screenplay Gullible's Travels.

In 2020, he wrote and directed the feature "Wish Upon A Unicorn" for Universal 1440.

In August 2023 their film The Monkey King was the most streamed program on Netflix and reached number 1 in 93 countries.

== Filmography ==
Screenplays, all co-written with Ron J. Friedman, except where noted:

- The Best Movie Ever Made (1994; with John King, Chris LaMont and David Wrightfield)
- Brother Bear (2003; with Tab Murphy, Lorne Cameron and David Hoselton)
- Chicken Little (2005; with Ron Anderson)
- Open Season (2006; with Nat Mauldin)
- Cats & Dogs: The Revenge of Kitty Galore (2010)
- The Monkey King (2023; with Rita Hsiao)
- F*ck Valentine's Day (TBA; Steve Bencich only)

As producer only:

- 10.0 Earthquake (2014)

As writer and director:

- Wish Upon a Unicorn (2020)
