= 3000 Whys of Blue Cat =

Chinese TV series

- Traditional Chinese: 藍貓淘氣3000問
- Simplified Chinese: 蓝猫淘气3000问
- Literal meaning: Blue Cat and Naughty's 3,000 Questions
- Hanyu Pinyin: Lán māo táoqì sānqiān wèn
- Country of origin: China
- Original language: Mandarin
- No. of episodes: 3,057

Original release
- Network: Beijing Television
- Release: 8 October 1999 – present

3000 Whys of Blue Cat (Chinese: 蓝猫淘气3000问) is the first large-scale Chinese animated series in mainland China, with an emphasis on science. The series is produced by "Hunan Sunchime Happy Culture Company". It is most commonly referred to as "Lan Mao", or "Blue Cat".

== History ==
In 1992, Wang Hong first began creating Blue Cat from a small workshop on Xiangya Road, Changsha City, Hunan Province, after being inspired by the children's science book series, "One Hundred Thousand Whys". He established Oriental Cartoon Production Co., Ltd. in Changsha City the following year in 1993. In 1997, he and Sun Wenhua, the chairman of Hunan Sanchen Company, established the joint venture of Sanchen Film Library. The cartoon "New 100,000 Whys" was produced. In 1998, Sanchen Film Library began to adapt this cartoon into "Naughty Blue Cat 3000 Questions", marking when the concept of the Blue Cat was officially introduced.

In June 1999, Wang Hong gave "Naughty Blue Cat 3000 Questions" to Beijing TV Station to broadcast for free, in exchange for 45 seconds of advertising time per episode. "Blue Cat" garnered attention in mainland China, and subsequently in 2000, Hong Kong Asia Television purchased and promoted it widely. In August 2001, Sanchen Cartoon Group took part in the industrial development of "Blue Cat" cartoon image derivative products, beginning the commercialization of "Blue Cat". In December 2004, Sanchen Cartoon Group launched the "Blue Cat" game.

However, earlier in 2004, Wang Hong withdrew from Sanchen Cartoon Group and established Hongmeng Cartoon Group with He Mengfan. On January 18, 2005, Sanchen Cartoon sued Wang Hong and Hongmeng Company in the Hunan Provincial Higher People's Court on the grounds that the defendant cannot engage in the same or similar business as the plaintiff. The court ruled that henceforth, Hongmeng Company may not produce or issue more Howie & Landau cartoons, with the exception of the Howie & Landau Seven Chivalrous Biography series.

In December 2006, Sanchen Cartoon Group signed an agreement with South Korea's Dongwoo Animation to translate and broadcast the cartoon to South Korea. A contract was also signed with Thailand Wisdom Education Group to translate and introduce the "Blue Cat" book series to local primary and secondary schools. On November 28, 2007, the mutual shareholding of Hunan Hongmeng Cartoon and Sanchen Cartoon was formally integrated, establishing the Hunan Blue Cat Animation Media Co., Ltd. In 2009, Hunan Blue Cat Animation Media Co., Ltd. launched the "Blue Cat Dragoon" series.

== Story ==
Blue Cat's blue color symbolizes dreams. The character is always curious and eager to explore different parts of the world. Blue Cat can visit any era of time through his vivid imagination.

== Characters ==
Name	Description	Appearances
Blue Cat (Chinese: 蓝猫; pinyin: Lánmāo)	The main character, Blue Cat, is a super-cat with unparalleled strength. He loves to exercise and help others. He is optimistic, cheerful, brave, and honest, but sometimes careless. In the Adventure in Space series, he is represented as passionate, loyal, and persistent, and dreams of becoming the greatest space adventurer. In Blue Cat Dragon Rider, he becomes the leader of the Dragon Rider Dragoon, using his dragon mount and spear to protect world peace.	All series
Naughty / Taoqi (Chinese: 淘气; pinyin: Táoqì) (Hong Kong version: WhyWhy)	Smart, curious, and energetic, Naughty is a green mouse who likes to tease others and has an adventurous spirit. In the Adventure in Space Series, he is the spaceship pilot, and dreams of becoming the greatest spaceship pilot.	The Classical Blue Cat Series, Interactive Television Program Series, Blue Cat for Kindergarten Series, Blue Cat Dragon Rider Series, and Legend of the Stars Series
Fei-Fei (Chinese: 菲菲; pinyin: Fēifēi) (Hong Kong version: Lemon, Chinese: 柠檬; pinyin: Níngméng; Jyutping: ning4 mung4-1)	Fei-Fei is an orange fox. Others may describe him as sly, but he likes to describe himself as simply smarter than others. In the Adventure in Space series, he is a junior doctor, but he is not very skilled. He often makes a mess of things, but also often uses his intelligence to correct it. In Blue Cat Dragon Rider, he is somewhat conceited and timid.	The Classical Blue Cat Series, Interactive Television Program Series, Blue Cat Dragon Rider Series, and Legend of the Stars Series
Fatty / Feizai (Chinese: 肥仔; pinyin: Féizaǐ)	A bookworm, Fatty is a yellow mouse primarily responsible for preparing scientific knowledge and diagrams, and is nicknamed the Little Doctor. He is straightforward, reliable, knowledgeable, polite, and acts like a gentleman. In the Adventure in Space series, he analyzes the internal mechanisms of unknown spaceships, masters spaceship technology, and dreams of building his ideal spaceship.	The Humor Stage Series, Star Wars Series, Dinosaur Times Series, and Ocean World Series
Gali (Chinese: 咖喱; pinyin: Gālí) (Hong Kong version: Hide-and-seek, Chinese: 捉依因; pinyin: Zhuōyīyīn; Jyutping: zuk1 ji1 jan4-1)	Innocent, lively, and kind, Gali is a pink mouse who can also be stubborn and vain. In the Humor Stage series, she resents Aunt Hen's meanness towards her. In the Adventure in Space series, she has no designated job, and constantly causes minor problems. In Blue Cat Dragon Rider, she is a doctor and is afraid of bugs. After becoming a Dragon Rider, she overcomes her effeminate personality.	The Classical Blue Cat Series, Interactive Television Program Series, Blue Cat Dragon Rider Series, and Legend of the Stars Series
Sweet Sister / Tianniu (Chinese: 甜妞; pinyin: Tiánniū) (Hong Kong version: Chinese: 肥茵; pinyin: Féiyīn; Jyutping: fei4 jan1)	With a big heart and a big body, Tianniu is a red pig who is honest, sincere, and comes from the countryside.	The Humor Stage Series, Star Wars Series, and Ocean World Series
Aunt Hen / Ji Dashen (Chinese: 鸡大婶; pinyin: Jīdàshěn) (Hong Kong version: Ms. Blabber, Chinese: 啰唆老师; pinyin: Luōsuōlǎoshī; Jyutping: lo1 so1 lou5 si1)	Named "Sesame Chicken" but referred to as Aunt Hen by the children, Aunt Hen is in her thirties and serves as the children's teacher and guardian. She can be conservative and old-fashioned.	The Humor Stage Series, Star Wars Series, and Dinosaur Times Series
Dr. Yang (Chinese: 羊博士; pinyin: Yángbóshì; lit. 'Dr. Sheep')	Beautiful, kind, intelligent, and capable. In the Dinosaur Times series, Dr. Yang is a researcher sent by the headquarters to aid in the investigation.	The Dinosaur Times Series, and Ocean World Series
Badou (Chinese: 巴豆; pinyin: Bādòu)	Although clumsy, simple-minded, and stubborn, Badou is also a strong bear who is kind at heart, and wants to help others. In the Adventure in Space series, he is the crew's nutritionist and a foodie. In Blue Cat Dragon Rider, he is unusually brave in times of emergency.	The Sports Competition Series, Knowledge Olympics Series, Adventure in Space Series, and Blue Cat Dragon Rider Series
Green Monkey (Chinese: 绿猴; pinyin: Lǜhóu)		The Sports Competition Series, and Knowledge Olympics Series
Red Dog (Chinese: 红狗; pinyin: Hónggǒu)		The Sports Competition Series, and Knowledge Olympics Series
Black Whistle (Raven) (Chinese: 黑哨; pinyin: Hēishào)		The Sports Competition Series, and Knowledge Olympics Series
Lala (Chinese: 啦啦; pinyin: Lālā)	Lala is an alien girl and Princess of Ozma. Introduced in the 6th season, she serves a key role in connecting the main series with the Blue Cat Dragon Rider series. When she returns in Blue Cat Dragon Rider, she is a scientist on Ozma, and the inventor of the Dragon Rider's bracelets. She often risks her own life for the safety of Earth.	The Adventures in Space Series, Mysteries of the Human Body Series, Blue Cat Dragon Rider Series, and Legend of the Stars Series
Buji (Chinese: 布叽; pinyin: Bùjī)		The Adventures in Space Series, and Legend of the Stars Series
Xiaoxiao (Chinese: 潇潇; pinyin: Xiāoxiāo)		The Team 119 Series
Guli (Chinese: 古力; pinyin: Gǔlì)		The Mysteries of the Human Body Series
Tuantuan (Chinese: 团团; pinyin: Tuántuán)		The Mysteries of the Human Body Series
Mante (Chinese: 曼特; pinyin: Màntè)		The Mysteries of the Human Body Series
Dongchen (Chinese: 东臣; pinyin: Dōngchén)		The Mysteries of the Human Body Series
Bosi (Chinese: 伯斯; pinyin: Bósī)		The Mysteries of the Human Body Series
Dr. Waiwai (Chinese: 歪歪博士; pinyin: Wāiwāibóshì)	Born on the same day as Hitler, Dr. Waiwai is the antagonist in the Blue Cat Dragon Rider series, plotting to control the Earth, and then the entire universe.	The Blue Cat Dragon Rider Series
Aardwolf (Chinese: 土狼; pinyin: Tǔláng)	One of Dr. Waiwai's minions, Aardwolf often messes up his missions, and hates it when other people hit him in the nose.	The Blue Cat Dragon Rider Series
One-eyed Eagle (Chinese: 独眼鹰; pinyin: Dúyǎnyīng)	One of Dr. Waiwai's minions, One-eyed Eagle is calm, composed, and strategic. He is highly intelligent and heartless, and absolutely loyal to Dr. Waiwai.	The Blue Cat Dragon Rider Series
Nine-tailed Fox (Chinese: 九尾狐; pinyin: Jiǔwěihú)	Originally one of Dr. Waiwai's minions, Nine-tailed Fox is sly, quick-witted, and daring. After realizing she had been tricked by Dr. Waiwai, she switches sides.	The Blue Cat Dragon Rider Series
Diandian (Chinese: 典典; pinyin: Diǎndiǎn)		The Blue Cat's Journey to the West Series

== Series ==
=== 3000 Whys of Blue Cat ===
The "3000 Whys of Blue Cat" series has about 3,000 episodes, each about 15 minutes long, and had 150 million yuan invested into it. (Note: 15 minutes includes the intro, body, and outro. In the beginning, the body was set at 8 minutes and 30 seconds long. Beginning in 2002, it was 9 minutes long, and beginning in 2005, it was between 9 minutes 30 seconds and 10 minutes long.) The theme song is called "It's a Big World" (Chinese: 《地厚天高》; lit. 'Earth Thick Sky High'). The animation centers around the adventures of Blue Cat, Naughty, and other characters. Each episode explains a piece of knowledge. This series is the story of the beginning of the characters' adventures in the world.

- 365 eps for Incredible Adventures of Blue Cat

Series Title	Main Characters	Synopsis	Number of Episodes
Humor Stages Series, also known as Classical Blue Cat (Chinese: 幽默舞台系列)	Blue Cat, Naughty, Fei-Fei, Fatty, Gali, Tianniu, and Aunt Hen	This series is the opening work of 3000 Whys of Blue Cat. Each episode is a stand-alone story, mainly focusing on questions that commonly appear in daily life. The later 5 series instead take place in the backdrop of a larger plot, with each episode being a small part of a serial story, although each episode still focuses on a piece of knowledge. In addition, there are many small series within the Humor Stages Series that are shorter than 100 episodes, such as Constellation Stories (Chinese: 星座故事), Topography (Chinese: 地形地貌), Technological Innovations (Chinese: 科技创新), Natural Phenomena (Chinese: 自然现象), etc.	424
Star Wars Series (Chinese: 星际大战系列)	Blue Cat, Naughty, Fei-Fei, Fatty, Gali, Tianniu, and Aunt Hen	This series focuses on "aliens." The beginning of the series focuses on a United Alien Fleet, and the middle of the series on an underground alien force that plots to dominate the universe and attack Earth. Blue Cat, Naughty, and other galactic fighters defend against this invasion.	384
Dinosaur Times Series (Chinese: 恐龙时代系列)	Blue Cat, Naughty, Fei-Fei, Fatty, Gali, Aunt Hen, and Dr. Yang	This series is continuous with the plot of the previous series, as aliens combine various dinosaur genes to develop destructive and powerful dinosaurs for the goal of destroying Earth. To defeat these dinosaurs and protect the Earth, Blue Cat and friends go back to dinosaur times to obtain the original dinosaur genes. After triumphing over the aliens, Blue Cat and friends continue their adventures in the Triassic Period.	264
Ocean World Series (Chinese: 海洋世界系列)	Blue Cat, Naughty, Fei-Fei, Fatty, Gali, Aunt Hen, and Dr. Yang	Earth's resources are running out. Blue Cat and friends form scouting parties and venture into the ocean world to look for resources.	312
Sports Competition Series, also known as Living Olympics (Chinese: 运动竞技系列)	Blue Cat, Naughty, Fei-Fei, Fatty, Gali, Tianniu, Green Monkey, Red Dog, Black Whistle, and Badou	Blue Cat promotes "happy exercise" in the sports arena.	226 or 257 (Note: Officially counted as 226 episodes, but a manual tally finds 257 episodes.)
Space Series, also known as Adventure in Space (Chinese: 航空航天系列 or 太空历险记)	Blue Cat, Naughty, Fei-Fei, Fatty, Gali, Badou, Lala, and Buji	Legend says in the depths of space, there is a highly developed planet named Ozma. Inspired by Yang Liwei, the first person sent into space by the Chinese space program, Blue Cat aspires to become the greatest space hero. He gathers his friends and builds his own adventuring crew, and they meet Lala, a girl from Ozma.	400
Safe Driving Series (Chinese: 交通安全系列 or 平安出行)		The modern city Sun City attracts people from all over the world, resulting in heavy traffic in the city. The children take it upon themselves to protect transportation.	108
The Team 119 Series (Chinese: 消防安全系列 or 消防大本营)		Blue Cat, Xiaoxiao, and other children form the 119 Squad under the guidance of firefighters.	119
Knowledge Olympics Series (Chinese: 知识奥运系列 or 运动小子)		The winner of Wheat Town's sports competition will become the Olympic torch bearer. Blue Cat and friends are going to eagerly try out.	64
Mysteries of the Human Body Series (Chinese: 人体奥秘系列 or 健康特攻队)		Blue Cat is the leader of the Special Health Squad. The members of the squad are guided by Dr. Yuan from the medical research center, and help cure patient Tuantuan of an alien virus.	104 (Note: CCTV cut it down to 64 episodes for broadcast, but the full 104 episodes are available on local TV stations and iQiyi.)

=== Interactive Television Program ===
Series Title	Main Characters	Synopsis	Number of Episodes
(Chinese: 妙想总动员)		One of Golden Eagle Animation's English learning programs. Currently titled Happy Parade (Chinese: 开心派乐多).	Unknown
Happy Blue Cat CPU (Chinese: 快乐蓝猫CPU)		In the style of flash animation, this series uses many currently popular elements and internet slang.	Unknown

=== Blue Cat for Kindergarten ===
Series Title	Main Characters	Synopsis	Number of Episodes
Blue Cat Reading is Fun (Chinese: 蓝猫趣味识字)			About 32
Blue Cat Elementary School Art (Chinese: 蓝猫小学美术)			About 16
Blue Cat Elementary School Pinyin (Chinese: 蓝猫小学拼音)			About 16
Blue Cat Early Childhood Math (Chinese: 蓝猫幼儿数学)			About 8
Blue Cat Early Childhood Science (Chinese: 蓝猫幼儿科学)			Unknown
Blue Cat Learns to Sing English Songs (Chinese: 蓝猫学唱英语歌)			Unknown

=== Blue Cat Dragon Rider ===
This series is set in the future, when evil forces plot to endanger Earth's peace. Blue Cat and friends, with the assistance of Lala, a researcher from Ozma, form the defense squad Dragon Riders to protect Earth's peace.

Series Title	Main Characters	Synopsis	Number of Episodes
Blue Cat Dragon Rider Series (Chinese: 蓝猫龙骑团)	Blue Cat, Naughty, Fei-Fei, Gali, Badou, Lala, Dr. Waiwai, Aardwolf, One-eyed Eagle, and Nine-tailed Fox	In the depths of space, the technologically advanced planet of Ozma erupts into war, pushing it to the verge of destruction. During the war, a bracelet with magical powers splits into 6 pieces. The planet's lead scientist Lala is only able to find 5 pieces, with the 6th and central fragment lost in the vastness of space. To save Ozma, Dr. Lala pursues the lost fragment and arrives at Earth. At this time, malicious technological powers increasingly threaten the existence of humanity, and Earth faces the same fate as Ozma. Dr. Lala decides to develop the Dragon Rider bracelet to help Earth build the strongest defense force – the Dragon Riders. Unbeknownst to her, her assistant Dr. Waiwai is a representative of the malicious technological power, and plots to steal the magical Dragon Rider bracelet to upgrade his own evil weapon – the Beast King. Led by Blue Cat, the five members of the Dragon Riders begin their herculean battle against Dr. Waiwai and his evil gang.	60
The Flower of Life (Chinese: 生命之花)	Blue Cat, Naughty, Fei-Fei, Gali, Badou, Lala, Dr. Waiwai, and Aardwolf		48
Legend of Xuandi (Chinese: 炫迪传奇)	Blue Cat, Naughty, Fei-Fei, Gali, Badou, Lala, Dr. Waiwai, Aardwolf, and Xuandi		76

=== Blue Cat's Journey to the West ===
Series Title	Main Characters	Synopsis	Number of Episodes
Blue Cat's Journey to the West (Chinese: 蓝猫西行记)	Blue Cat and Diandian	Blue Cat and the little elf Diandian try to escape a strange dimension by going to various places in the world and completing a series of tasks. The series describes the etiquette and culture of various Western countries.	104
Blue Cat BangBangBang (Chinese: 蓝猫帮帮帮)	Blue Cat and Diandian	Blue Cat and the little elf Diandian live in the Tree of Knowledge, and form the BangBang squad to help the people who call their hotline.	52

=== Legend of the Stars ===
Series Title	Main Characters	Synopsis	Number of Episodes
Legend of the Stars (Chinese: 星史传说)	Blue Cat, Naughty, Fei-Fei, Fatty, Gali, Badou, Lala, and Buji	This series has no official synopsis.	240

== Merchandise ==
Along with the cartoon programs, the franchise has produced home videos, books, CDs, kids' clothes and shoes, toys, beverages, and candy. The planning of a "Blue Cat Theme Park" had also entered the appraisal stage in 2006. On 4 August 2006, Sega also announced a collaboration with "Sunchime Cartoon Group" and Suzhou based game software developer "XPEC Entertainment" to jointly develop and release video games or other forms of digital entertainment content based on the Blue Cat.
