= Ron J. Friedman =

American screenwriter

- Occupation: Screenwriter
- Years active: 1994–present

Ron J. Friedman is an American screenwriter best known for his work with writing partner Steve Bencich.

Friedman and Bencich have collaborated on screenplays for several animated films, including Brother Bear, Chicken Little and Open Season. DreamWorks has purchased their comedy screenplay Gullible's Travels, about a gullible man who travels in time in a portable toilet.

In August 2023, their film The Monkey King was the most streamed program on Netflix and reached number 1 in 93 countries.

== Filmography ==
Screenplays, all co-written with Steve Bencich:

- The Best Movie Ever Made (1994; with John King, Chris LaMont and David Wrightfield)
- Paul McCall (1996; with Benjamin Hershleder)
- Brother Bear (2003; with Tab Murphy, Lorne Cameron and David Hoselton)
- Chicken Little (2005; with Ron Anderson)
- Open Season (2006; with Nat Mauldin)
- Cats & Dogs: The Revenge of Kitty Galore (2010)
- The Monkey King (2023; with Rita Hsiao)
