= Howie & Landau =

- Genre: Animated series
- Created by: Wang Hong; He Mengfan
- Directed by: Wang Hong; He Mengfan
- Country of origin: China
- Original language: Mandarin

Production
- Running time: 10-17 minutes
- Production company: Great Dreams Cartoon

Original release
- Network: HBS (Aniworld), CCTV, Jiangsu TV (Youman Cartoon), Guangdong TV (Jiajia Cartoon), Beijing TV, Shanghai TV (Toonmax)
- Release: 26 February 2004 – 2011

Howie & Landau (Chinese: 虹猫蓝兔), also known as Hongmao and Lantu, is a Chinese animated series created by Wang Hong and He Mengfan and produced by Great Dreams Cartoon. They are most commonly referred to as "Hongmao" and "Lantu", or "Howie" and "Landau". The series uses a combination of 2D animation and CGI.

== Characters ==
- Howie (Hongmao/虹猫） - a red cat who is the head of the Seven Swords. He is superb in martial arts, strong and brave, and resourceful. Handsome and unrestrained, he is the leader of the Seven Swords and shoulders the important task of uniting the descendants of the Seven Swords and eradicating the demon sect. Cheerful and enthusiastic, he exudes sunshine at all times.
- Landau (Lantu/蓝兔） - a blue rabbit who is the head of Jade Toad Palace. She is beautiful, talented in martial arts, and insightful. Fight side by side with Hongmao and others, going through life and death. She is full of emotions, kind and simple. Sometimes she is taken advantage of by others, but sometimes she is also independent and can get along with anyone easily and happily.
- Sally （Sha Li/莎莉） - a pink squirrel. The descendant of the "Purple Cloud Sword" of the Seven Swords, turned out to be the real proprietress of the Golden Whip Creek Inn. Because she was persecuted by Ma Sanniang and became a mute girl, she gave up on herself many times at first, but later she defeated herself with the help of Rainbow Cat and Blue Rabbit, practiced the left-hand sword technique, and stabbed Ma Sanniang in the heart with a sword at the last moment. Revenge and bloodshed.
- Tease (Dou Dou/逗逗） - a brown bulldog with poison-based superpowers. The descendant of the "Rain Flower Sword" of the Seven Swords, he is a miraculous doctor who can cure diseases and save people. His whole body is full of medicine, and he is also good at using various poisons. A bit timid, greedy for life and afraid of death, and at the same time very concerned about face, but for the sake of justice in the world, he can also sacrifice his life for justice.
- Big Ben (Daben/大奔） - a wine-obsessed polar bear. The descendant of the "Thunder Sword" of the Seven Swords, he was chivalrous, bold and powerful. He did not get the Thunder Sword because he was fond of drinking and gambling. Later, he gave up drinking and gambling completely and got the Thunder Sword, which greatly increased its power.
- Jumper (Tiao-tiao/跳跳） - a spider monkey who wants to avenge the death of his parents. The descendant of the "Green Light Sword" of the Seven Swords, he is smart and witty. In order to avenge his parents, he has been undercover in the Demon Sect for many years. He is the protector of the Demon Sect and has been secretly helping the Six Heroes.
- Dada （达达） - a panda who owns the Baicao Valley. The successor of the "Whirlwind Sword" of the Seven Swords is the owner of Baicao Valley, and he is in love with his wife, Mrs. Da. He is willing to do anything for his wife.
- Ma Sanniang（马三娘）The undercover agent placed by the Demon Sect in Seven Swords is sinister and vicious, with a heart of snakes and scorpions. Her main task is to pretend to be the master of Ziyun Sword, to bring about the combination of the seven swords, and to make Qilin appear. Her true intention is to dominate the martial arts world by himself, and she does not want to give the Black Tiger and her son the Kirin. After being killed by Sally, she was resurrected and killed the people on Snow Island. In the end, she lost his son Amu and regretted it too late.
- Black-hearted Tiger (Hēixīn hǔ/黑心虎) - a villainous South China tiger who is the leader of the Demon Cult.The leader of the demon sect was defeated by the White Cat and the Seven Swords fifty years ago. He devoted himself to training for fifty years and then came out again. He wanted to increase his internal strength by drinking the blood of unicorns and dominate the martial arts world, causing a bloody storm. He could deny his relatives during the attack, but he still doted on Hei Xiaohu. The emotion he showed when Hei Xiaohu died made people think that he was just a father who wanted to protect his son. In the end, he was killed by the combination of seven swords.
- Black Tiger (Hēi xiǎohǔ/黑小虎) - Black-hearted Tiger's deceased son. The son of the leader of the demon sect, Black Heart Tiger, his special move "Tian Mo Luan Wu" is astonishingly powerful. For the safety of his father Black Heart Tiger, he chased Hongmao and others all the way and tried his best to prevent the combination of the Seven Swords. But he has a crush on Blue Rabbit, which often puts him in a dilemma, and therefore helps Seven Swords a lot. In the end, he was unable accept Blue Rabbit's indifference and went crazy. He stepped on the explosive and killed himself.

== Overall ==
Season	Original Title	English Translation	Runtime	Original AirDate
1	虹猫蓝兔小幽默	Howie & Landau Little Humor	20 episodes	2005
2	虹猫蓝兔七侠传	Howie & Landau Seven Chivalrous Biography	108 episodes	2006
3	虹猫蓝兔阿木星	Howie & Landau Jupiter	30 episodes	2007
4	虹猫仗剑走天涯	Howie & Landau Sword Go to the Horizon	108 episodes	2008
5	虹猫蓝兔光明剑	Howie & Landau Light Sword	79 episodes	2009
Movie	虹猫蓝兔火凤凰	Howie & Landau Phoenix Rising	85 minutes	February 5, 2010
6	虹猫蓝兔之勇者归来	Howie & Landau Brave Return	104 episodes	2011

Sample Cartoons

- 11 eps (originally intended to have over 100) for Explore the Space with Hongmao and Lantu
- 84 eps for Howie & Landau's Humorous Theatre
- 65 eps for Howie & Landau's Cartoon Happy World
- 95 eps for Howie & Landau's Happy Moments
- 84 eps for Howie & Landau's You Asked Me
- 80 eps for Howie & Landau's Fairy Tales Adventures
- 80 eps for Howie & Landau's Happy Literacy
- 47 eps for Howie & Landau's Happy Chi Qu Yuan
- 100 eps for Howie & Landau's Universe
- 90 eps for Howie & Landau's Dinosaurs
- 52 eps for Howie & Landau: Seabed Adventures
- 56 eps for Howie & Landau: Dream Adventures
- 52 eps for Howie & Landau: Austrian Adventures
- 52 eps for Howie & Landau Sidequels: Tiao-tiao the Guardian
