= Russian Blue =

Breed of cat

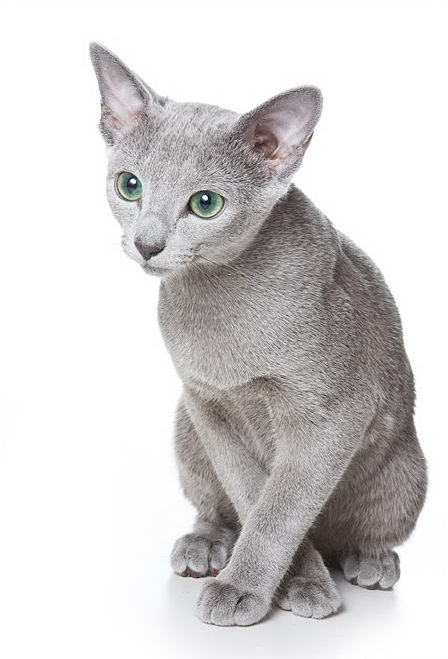
- Russian blue male, sporting the characteristic blue coat with a silver sheen
- Other names: Archangel Blue, Archangel Cat
- Origin: (Russia) Russian Empire

Breed standards
- CFA: standard
- FIFe: standard
- TICA: standard
- ACF: standard
- ACFA/CAA: standard
- CCA-AFC: standard
- GCCF: standard

Notes
- The ACF and GCCF also recognise Russian Blues in white and black, however the CFA does not. In addition, ACFA recognises Russian Shorthairs in white, black, and blue.

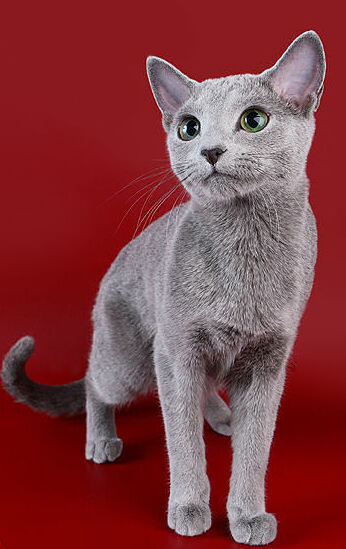
Adult showing the typical lean build

The Russian Blue cat (Russian: Русская голубая кошка, romanized: Russkaya golubaya koshka), commonly known as the Russian Blue, is a pedigreed cat breed characterised by a solid blue coat that has been the breed’s defining feature for over a century. The Russian Blue breed is accepted for registry and holds championship status with all major international cat registries. It is a short-haired breed noted for its dense, plush double coat of pale blue-grey fur with a distinct silver sheen, and for its bright emerald green to yellow-green eyes.

== History ==
The Russian Blue is selectively bred from a naturally occurring landrace that may have originated in the port of Arkhangelsk in Russia. They are also sometimes called Archangel Blues. It is believed that sailors took them from the Archangel Isles to Great Britain and Northern Europe in the 1860s. The first reference to an Archangel Cat appears in British print in 1862. The first recorded appearance of one in a show was in 1872 at The Crystal Palace in England as the Archangel Cat. However, Harrison Weir writing in 1895 reported that the early show cats under the Russian Blue name were British-bred grey tabbies, with separate grey cats arriving from Archangel in Britain in the 1800s with features consistent with the modern breed. The Russian Blue competed in a class including all other blue cats until 1912, when it was given its own class. The breed was developed mainly in the UK and Scandinavia until after World War II.

Right after the war, a lack of numbers of Russian Blues led to crossbreeding with the Siamese. Although Russian Blues were in the United States before the war, it was not until the post-war period that US breeders created the modern Russian Blue that is seen in the United States today. US breeders combined the bloodlines of both the Scandinavian and British Russian Blues. The Siamese traits have now largely been bred out.

They have been used on a limited basis to create other breeds such as the Havana Brown or alter existing breeds such as the Nebelung. They are being used in Italy as a way to make Oriental Shorthairs healthier and more robust called RUS4OSH in FIFe.

== Breed registration ==
Whilst the breed started with foundation cats of a natural landrace from Russia, the Russian Blue is selectively bred and pedigreed in all major cat fancier and breeder organisations. This means that all Russian Blue cats are purebred cats with a formally registered ancestry.

=== Russian White, Black, and Tabby ===
Russian Whites and Blacks were created from crosses with domestic white cats which were allegedly imported from Russia. The first line was developed by Frances McLeod (Arctic) in the United Kingdom during the 1960s and the second line produced by Dick and Mavis Jones (Myemgay) in Australia in the 1970s. By the late 1970s, the Russian White and Russian Black colours were accepted by cat fanciers in Australia (ACF) as well as in South Africa and now also in the United Kingdom (GCCF) as Russian cats (in different classes). However, the CFA, FIFe, TICA, and WCF do not recognise any colour variation other than blue for the Russian Blue.

=== Colourpoints ===
This blue coat colour is the dilute expression of the black gene. However, as dilute genes are recessive ("d") and each parent will have a set of two recessive genes ("dd") two non-Colour-Point Carrier (non-CPC) Russian Blues will always produce a blue cat. Due to the breeding with Siamese after World War II, there are colour-point genes in the RB lines. If two carriers are bred together, then they will produce a litter of mixed colours—solid blue or blue-point, similar to a Siamese. People call these CPC cats "colour-point", "whites" or "pointed" Russians. In most registries, one cannot register, breed or show a colour-point Russian. These colour-point (blue-point) cats are called Colour-Point-Russian Blue (Blue Point Russian Blue) or more informally as Pika Blu (or pika blue) cats and have the same general characteristics as the Russian Blue cats.

=== Non-Russian Blue lines ===
Short hair and a darker slate-greyish blue colour is often seen in random-bred cats, which are not related to this breed of pedigree registered cats. Mislabelling a cat as a Russian Blue can affect the breed and increase the cat population.

Russian Blues should not be confused with British Blues (which are not a distinct breed, but rather a British Shorthair with a blue coat as the British Shorthair breed itself comes in a wide variety of colours and patterns), nor the Chartreux or Korat which are two other selectively bred naturally occurring breeds of blue cats, although they have similar traits.

=== Popularity ===
The breed is considered relatively rare. In 2024, 2370 British Blue kittens—representing approximately 2.5% of their total registrations—were registered with the FIFe, one of the major global cat registries.

== Characteristics ==
=== Appearance ===
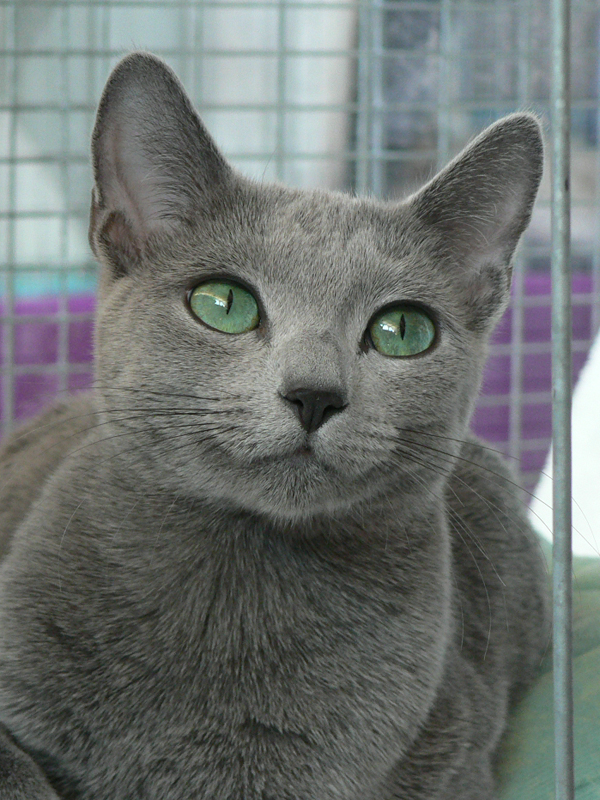
Russian Blue's green eyes

Russian Blues are small to moderate-sized cats with an average weight of 3.6 to 6.8 kg (8 to 15 lb) when fully grown. Males will typically be larger than females. Their gestation period is approximately 64 days.

The Russian Blue is distinguished from other breeds by its vivid emerald green eyes, pinkish lavender to mauve paw pads, and a dense, short double coat in a solid, shimmering pale blue-grey colour. The coat is known as a "double coat", with the undercoat being soft, downy and equal in length to the guard hairs. The guard hairs are an even blue with distinctly silver tips, which produce the breed’s characteristic silvery sheen and lustrous appearance. The fur is often described as exceptionally thick and soft to the touch. While the body colour is solid, the tail may display faint, barely perceptible tabby striping. In show cats, the presence of white patches or yellow eyes in adulthood is regarded as a fault.

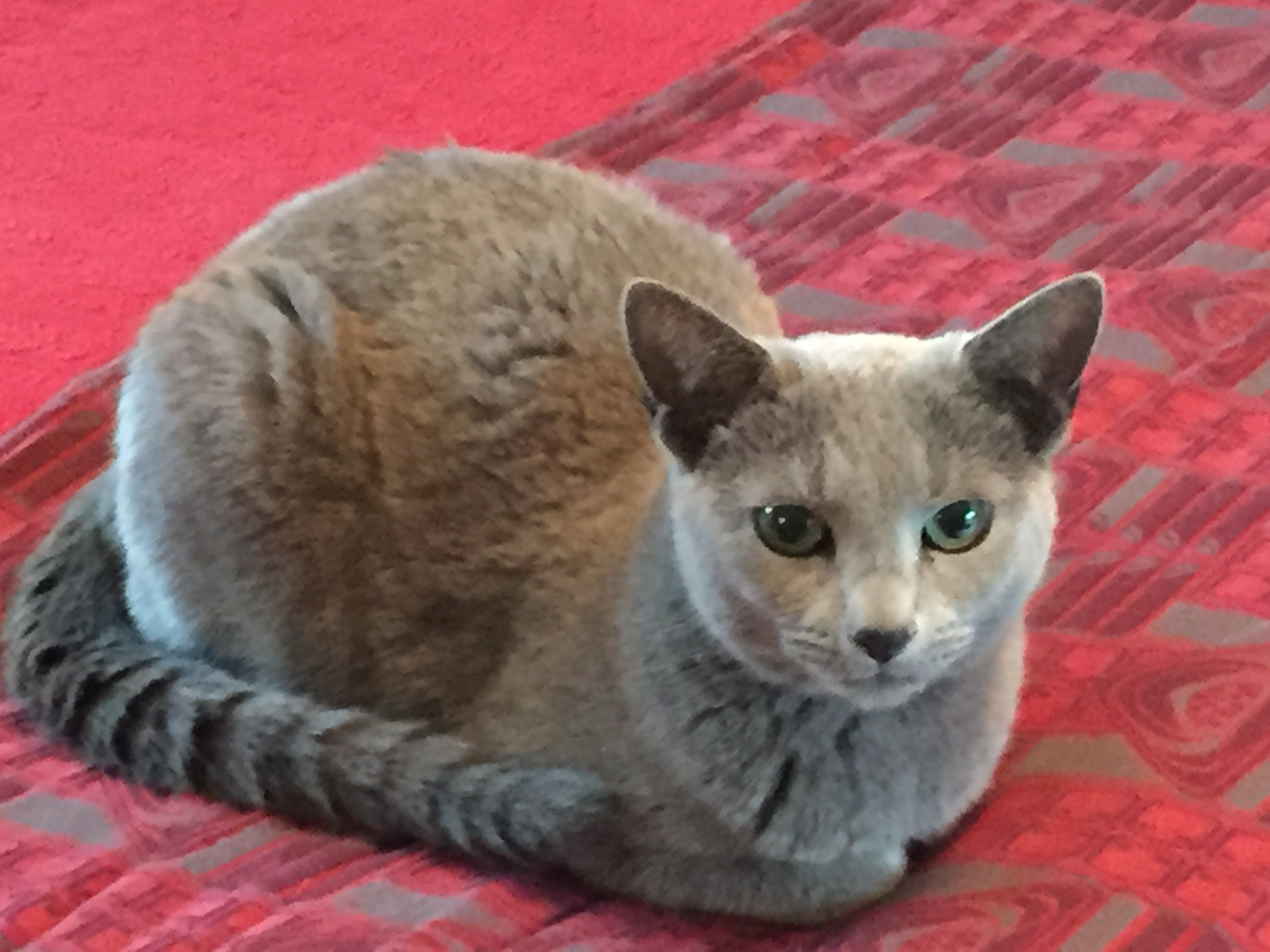
Tail stripes on a Russian Blue

=== Behaviour ===
The Russian Blue is considered to be a quiet breed which is normally reserved around strangers, yet which is extremely intelligent and independent. Russian Blues have an excellent memory, often learning the hiding places of favourite toys or treats and leading their owners to them when they want them. They also have a keen ability to remember favourite visitors and will race to greet familiar faces even if quite some time has passed between visits. Many Russian Blues have been trained to do tricks, and can also be fierce hunters, often catching rodents, birds, rabbits, small mammals, or reptiles. As aloof and independent as Russian Blues can be, they generally do not like change, and prefer predictable, routine schedules.

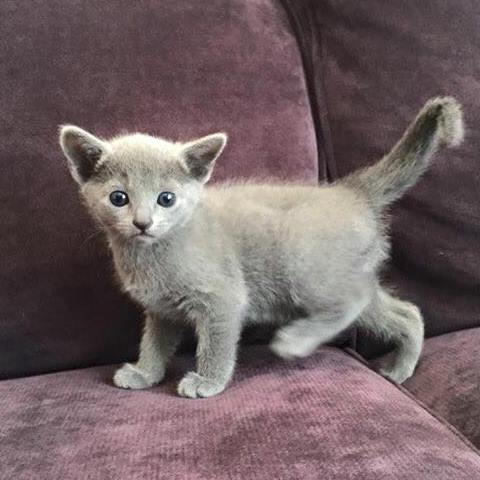
Two-month-old kitten

Russian Blue kittens are energetic and can become bored or mischievous without adequate playmates or toys. They are athletic and highly adept at leaping and climbing. Slow to mature, Russian Blues retain many of their adolescent traits until they are 3–4 years old and remain playful well into adulthood.

Russian Blues are known to enjoy observing their surroundings from high places, and may leap onto humans' shoulders for "rides".

== In popular culture ==
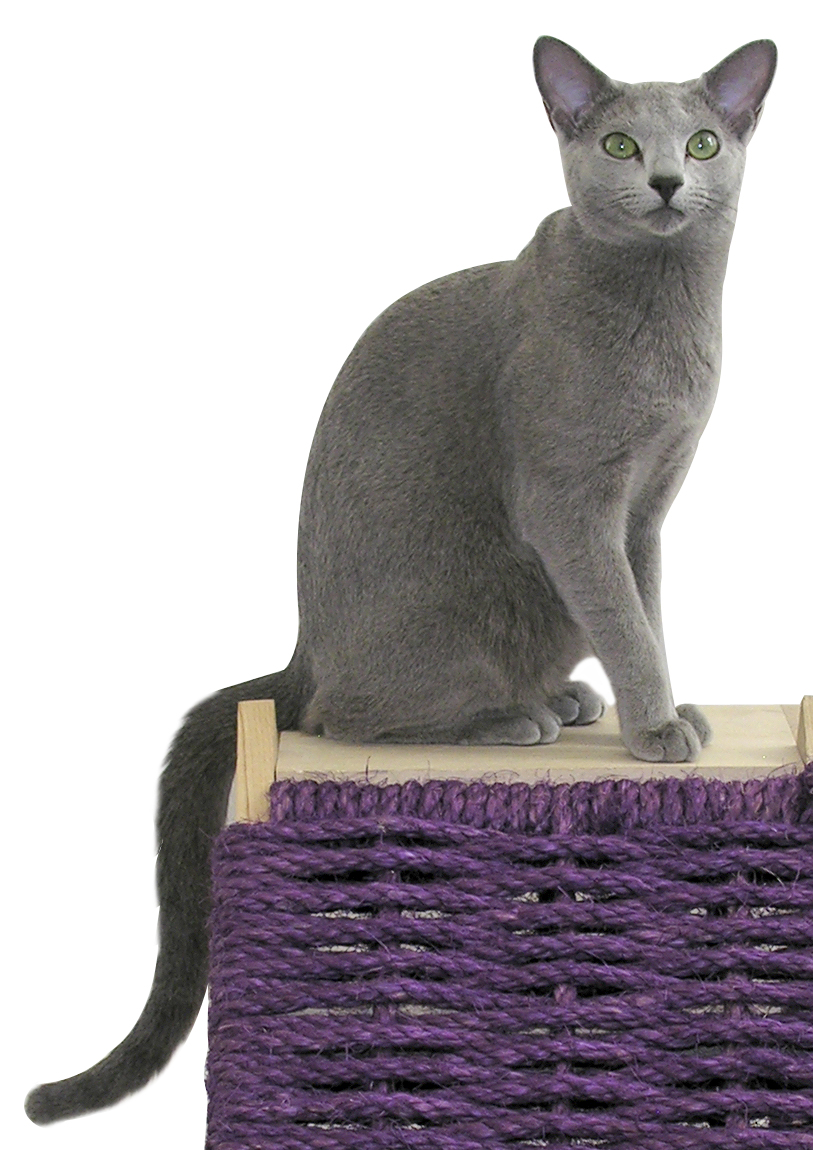
One-year-old male

- Arlene is portrayed by a Russian Blue in Garfield: The Movie.
- Felicity, a character in the novel and film Felidae, is a Russian Blue.
- A Russian Blue kitten is a trained assassin in the Cats & Dogs film. According to audio commentary on the DVD, several kittens were used due to the kittens growing faster than the filming schedule. Catherine from its sequel Cats & Dogs: The Revenge of Kitty Galore is also a Russian Blue.
- Eben and Snooch are Russian Blues in the comic Two Lumps.
- The Nyan Cat meme was inspired by creator Chris Torres' Russian Blue Marty. Marty died in 2012 from feline infectious peritonitis.
- Tom Cat of the Hanna-Barbera cartoon-produced for MGM Tom and Jerry is said to have been inspired by a Russian Blue.
- In A Gentleman in Moscow by Amor Towles, the Metropol Hotel's lobby cat is a Russian Blue.
- Smokey, the main antagonist in the film Stuart Little, is a Russian Blue.
- Kilmousky in the Midsomer Murders episode "Written in Blood" causes DCI Tom Barnaby an allergic reaction.

== See also ==
- Nebelung, a moderately-long haired breed which used the Russian Blue as an outcross
- Russian White, Black, and Tabby
