= Cats & Dogs: The Revenge of Kitty Galore =

2010 film by Brad Peyton

- Theatrical release poster
- Directed by: Brad Peyton
- Written by: Ron J. Friedman; Steve Bencich
- Based on: Cats & Dogs by: John Requa; Glenn Ficarra
- Produced by: Andrew Lazar; Polly Johnsen
- Starring: Christina Applegate; Michael Clarke Duncan; Neil Patrick Harris; Sean Hayes; James Marsden; Bette Midler; Nick Nolte; Joe Pantoliano; Katt Williams; Chris O'Donnell; Jack McBrayer; Fred Armisen; Paul Rodriguez
- Cinematography: Steven Poster
- Edited by: Julie Rogers
- Music by: Christopher Lennertz
- Production companies: Village Roadshow Pictures; CD2 Pictures; Mad Chance; Polymorphic Pictures
- Distributed by: Warner Bros. Pictures
- Release dates: July 25, 2010 (Grauman's Chinese Theatre); July 30, 2010 (United States)
- Running time: 82 minutes
- Countries: Australia; United States
- Language: English
- Budget: $85 million
- Box office: $112.5 million

Cats & Dogs: The Revenge of Kitty Galore (also known as Cats & Dogs 2 or Cats & Dogs 2: The Revenge of Kitty Galore) is a 2010 American spy comedy film directed by Brad Peyton in his feature directorial debut, produced by Andrew Lazar and Polly Johnsen, and written by Ron J. Friedman and Steve Bencich based on the characters by John Requa and Glenn Ficarra. The film stars Chris O'Donnell, Jack McBrayer, Fred Armisen, and Paul Rodriguez with an ensemble voice cast of James Marsden, Nick Nolte, Christina Applegate, Katt Williams, Bette Midler, Neil Patrick Harris, Wallace Shawn, and Roger Moore, with Sean Hayes, Joe Pantoliano, and Michael Clarke Duncan reprising their roles from the first film. The film is a stand-alone sequel to the 2001 film Cats & Dogs, with more emphasis on its animal characters than the previous film.

In the film, former M.E.O.W.S. operative Kitty Galore is discovered to be executing an evil plot against the dogs and her cat comrades, forcing both groups of animals to team up and stop Kitty Galore from taking over the world. It premiered at the Grauman's Chinese Theatre on July 25, 2010, and was released on July 30 in the United States, by Warner Bros. Pictures. Unlike its predecessor, it received generally negative reviews from critics and was a box office failure, grossing $112.5 million on an $85 million budget.

== Plot ==
Dogs and cats are secretly highly intelligent, capable of speech, and maintain spy agencies to protect the world. In Germany, a bloodhound named Rex discovers a Cocker Spaniel puppy stealing secret codes. The thief reveals herself to be Kitty Galore, a hairless Sphynx cat, in disguise. After she escapes, Rex alerts the agents that he has spotted her. At a San Francisco used car dealership, the mascot Crazy Carlito (dressed like Uncle Sam) plans to bomb the building. Police officer Shane Larson and his dog Diggs arrive on the scene. Diggs recklessly retrieves the detonator from Carlito but bites it in the process, blowing up the building. Butch and Lou, now a fully grown Beagle and the head of D.O.G. HQ, watch the incident. Lou wants to recruit Diggs as an agent, and Butch reluctantly agrees.

Diggs is locked in the police kennels to prevent further accidents. Butch brings him to D.O.G. HQ. After tracking down a pigeon named Seamus with valuable information, Diggs and Butch meet a M.E.O.W.S. (Mousers Enforcing Our World's Safety) agent named Catherine, who is also in pursuit of Seamus. Catherine reveals that Kitty Galore is a former M.E.O.W.S. agent named Ivana Clawyu who fell into a vat of hair removal cream in a cosmetics factory when a guard dog chased her while on a mission. Humiliated by her fellow agents, Kitty left M.E.O.W.S. and, unrecognized and thrown out by her former family on Christmas Eve due to her appearance, vowed revenge on cats, dogs and humans.

Lou forms an alliance with Tab Lazenby, head of M.E.O.W.S, to take down Kitty Galore. At a cat lady's home, the team discover that Calico, Mr. Tinkles' former aid, has been sending stolen technology to Kitty via pigeons. Diggs attacks Calico, who tries to drown the team in cat litter. They escape and interrogate Calico, who claims not to know Kitty's whereabouts but does know where his former boss is.

The team travels to Alcatraz, where Mr. Tinkles, mentally ill from his time with Mr. Mason's maid and her sisters, is confined. While he refuses to directly help them, he provides one clue: "A cat's eye reveals everything". When Kitty Galore learns that the cats and dogs have joined forces, she hires twin mercenaries Angus and Duncan MacDougall to kill Seamus on the boat returning from Alcatraz. Diggs subdues Angus and accidentally throws him overboard. Fed up with Diggs' mishaps completely ruining the mission, Butch dismisses him from the team and leaves with Seamus to salvage clues.

Catherine takes Diggs to her home where he meets her nieces who tickle his tummy. He's surprised they do not hate him as a dog, Catherine says they have not learned to hate dogs yet. He reveals that past experiences have made him unable to trust anyone, leading to difficulty following orders and spending most of his life in kennels. Catherine assures him if he continues to think that way, no one will be able to help him. Diggs realizes his error, and follows Catherine to M.E.O.W.S. HQ, where they learn with help from the clue Mr. Tinkles gave them that Kitty is hiding at a fairground with her new owner, amateur magician Chuck the Magnificent.

At the fair, Diggs and Catherine are captured by Kitty and her assistant, Paws. Kitty reveals her plot to transmit the "Call of the Wild", a frequency only dogs can hear that will make them hostile to humans. Kitty believes humans will abandon these unwanted dogs in kennels. Kitty tries to use the fair's flying swings ride as a satellite dish to broadcast the signal to an orbiting satellite. Diggs and Catherine escape after Diggs confess his feelings to Catherine and are joined by Butch and Seamus. Seamus presses a red button, believing it will shut down the ride, but he instead activates Kitty's signal. Dogs around the world begin to react. Paws battles them, revealing he is a robot; Diggs tricks him into biting the device's wires, destroying the satellite. Kitty's pet mouse Scrumptious, fed up with Kitty's abuse, launches the cat, leaving her covered in cotton candy and landing in Chuck's hat. With the mission a success, Diggs goes to live with Shane. Upon returning to H.Q., Diggs learns Mr. Tinkles has escaped prison with Calico.

== Cast ==
- Chris O'Donnell as Shane Larson, a police officer who wants to adopt Diggs, but the police force will not allow it.
- Jack McBrayer as Chuck, Kitty's new owner and an aspiring but scatterbrained amateur magician.
- Fred Armisen as Friedrich (cameo), a German worker who first finds Kitty Galore (disguised as a puppy) in a dumpster outside.
- Paul Rodriguez as Crazy Carlito (cameo), the mad bomber who disguises as Uncle Sam.
- Kiernan Shipka as a young girl who makes a cameo appearance when Diggs, Butch, Catherine, and Seamus are in the park. She is scared away by Seamus talking in front of her. She reappears on the ferry and at the fairground (both instances seeing Duncan talking and Kitty pleading for help respectively).
- Pascale Hutton as Jackie Larson, Shane's wife.
- Betty Phillips as Cat Lady

=== Voice cast ===
- James Marsden as Diggs, an dim-witted and rebellious German Shepherd who becomes an agent of D.O.G. and Catherine's partner and love interest.
- Nick Nolte as Butch, an elderly Anatolian Shepherd. Nolte replaced Alec Baldwin from the first film.
- Christina Applegate as Catherine (Agent 47 at M.E.O.W.S.), a sassy, yet kindhearted Russian Blue, who becomes Diggs' partner and love interest.
- Katt Williams as Seamus, a clumsy carrier pigeon.
- Bette Midler as Kitty Galore, a villanious Sphynx cat, formerly a M.E.O.W.S. agent named Ivana Clawyu. Kitty Galore is a parody of Pussy Galore.
- Neil Patrick Harris as Lou, a beagle who is the head official of D.O.G. HQ. Neil Patrick Harris replaced Tobey Maguire from the first film.
- Roger Moore as Tab Lazenby, a tuxedo cat who is the head of M.E.O.W.S. HQ. Tab Lazenby's name is a spoof of actor George Lazenby, who played James Bond.
- Joe Pantoliano as Peek, a Chinese Crested Dog. He is the tech specialist and head of Covert Ops at D.O.G. HQ.
- Phil LaMarr as Paws, a mechanical Maine Coon who works for Kitty. He also voices one of the Cat Spy Analysts. Paws is a parody of Jaws and the Terminator.
- Elizabeth Daily as Scrumptious, Kitty's pet albino mouse. She also voices one of Catherine's nieces and Patches.
- Sean Hayes as Mr. Tinkles, a Persian cat who is detained on Alcatraz Island.
- Michael Clarke Duncan as Sam, an Old English Sheepdog.
- Wallace Shawn as Calico, an exotic Shorthair who works for Mr. Tinkles. Wallace Shawn replaced Jon Lovitz from the first film.
- Len Morganti as Rex
- Christopher L. Parson as Hep Cat / Cat Spy Analyst
- Bonnie Cahoon as Dog HQ PA / Catherine's Niece
- J. K. Simmons as Gruff K-9
- Carlos Alazraqui as Cat Gunner
- Michael Beattie as Angus MacDougall, a mercenary cat who speaks with a Scottish accent, and Duncan's brother
- Jeff Bennett as Duncan MacDougall, a mercenary cat who also speaks with a Scottish accent, and Angus' brother
- Grey DeLisle as Security Bulldog / Catherine's niece / Cat Spy Analyst
- Roger Jackson as Fat Cat Inmate
- Bumper Robinson as Cool Cat / Dog Killa / Cat Spy Analyst / Slim
- André Sogliuzzo as Snobby K-9
- Rick D. Wasserman as Rocky
- Karen Strassman as French Poodle (uncredited)

== Production ==
In March 2003, it was reported that Warner Bros. Pictures was developing a sequel to Cats & Dogs but entered development hell with no further updates until 2008. By October 2008, it was reported that the sequel was now in production with Brad Peyton set to direct in his directorial debut from a script by Ron J. Friedman and Steve Bencich.

=== Filming ===
Filming took place in North Vancouver, British Columbia, and in the San Francisco Bay Area, which included locations such as Alcatraz Federal Penitentiary and Coit Tower. Steven Poster served as the cinematographer.

=== Visual effects and animation ===
The visual effects and animation were provided by Sony Pictures Imageworks, Tippett Studio, C.O.R.E. Digital Pictures, and The Embassy Visual Effects.

== Music ==
=== Soundtrack ===
Cats & Dogs: The Revenge of Kitty Galore (Music from the Motion Picture)

Soundtrack album by various artists
- Released: July 27, 2010
- Genres: Pop; rock; hip hop
- Length: 35:01
- Label: WaterTower
- Producer: Various

Cats & Dogs: The Revenge of Kitty Galore (Music from the Motion Picture) is the soundtrack album for the film that contains songs that were featured in it. It includes two original songs: "Born to be Wild", and "Atomic Dog". It includes a piece of score from the film, "Concerto for Claws and Orchestra", composed by Christopher Lennertz. A cover of the War song "Why Can't We Be Friends?", performed by Sean Kingston and Jasmine V, appears in the end credits.

The album was released on July 27, 2010, by WaterTower Music, three days before the film's release.

No.	Title	Writer(s)	Performer(s)	Length
1.	"Get the Party Started"	Linda Perry	Dame Shirley Bassey	3:59
2.	"Why Can't We Be Friends"	Sylvester Allen; Harold Brown; Morris Dickerson; Jerry Goldstein; Le Roy Jordan; Charles Miller; Lee Oskar; Howard Scott	Sean Kingston (feat. Jasmine V)	4:19
3.	"Bad to the Bone"	George Thorogood	George Thorogood and the Destroyers	4:50
4.	"Eye of the Tiger"	Frankie Sullivan; Jim Peterik	Spectacular! Cast	3:32
5.	"Born to be Wild"	Mars Bonfire	Alana D	3:01
6.	"Friend"	Ziggy Marley	Marley	2:53
7.	"Magic Carpet Ride"	Rushton Moreve; John Kay	KSM	2:57
8.	"Atomic Dog"	David Spradley; Garry Shider; George Clinton	The DeeKompressors	2:08
9.	"Let's Get Together"	Chet Powers	The Youngbloods	4:37
10.	"Concerto for Claws and Orchestra"	Christopher Lennertz		2:40
Total length:				35:01

Songs that appear in the film but aren't included on the soundtrack include:

- "I Believe I Can Fly"
- "Say What You Want"
- "Take A Ride"
- "Psycho Theme"
- "Holding On"
- "In The Still of the Night"
- "The Getaway"

=== Original score ===
Cats & Dogs: The Revenge of Kitty Galore (Original Motion Picture Score)

Film score by Christopher Lennertz
- Released: August 24, 2010
- Recorded: 2010
- Studios: Eastwood Scoring Stage, Warner Bros. Studios Burbank
- Genre: Film score
- Length: 63:49
- Label: Varèse Sarabande
- Producer: Christopher Lennertz

Christopher Lennertz chronology
Marmaduke (2010)	Cats & Dogs: The Revenge of Kitty Galore (2010)	Vampires Suck (2010)

Cats & Dogs: The Revenge of Kitty Galore (Original Motion Picture Score) contains the entire score for the film, composed by Christopher Lennertz and performed by the Hollywood Studio Symphony. The score was released by Varèse Sarabande Records on August 24, 2010.

No.	Title	Length
1.	"Opening"	3:45
2.	"Meet Butch"	1:11
3.	"Let It Go, Shane"	1:51
4.	"Trip To HQ"	0:55
5.	"Dog HQ"	2:14
6.	"Kitty's Threat"	1:57
7.	"Feline Megalomaniacal"	1:04
8.	"New Opening"	0:37
9.	"Coit Tower"	2:17
10.	"Meet Catherine"	1:09
11.	"Seamus Is Captured"	0:53
12.	"Kitty Galore"	1:51
13.	"Tab Lazenby"	1:41
14.	"Back To The Kennel"	1:14
15.	"Escape Claws"	0:55
16.	"Trapped!"	1:48
17.	"Calico's Tale / Mr. Tinkles"	2:56
18.	"Cat's Eye Clue"	1:49
19.	"Chuck The Not So Magnificent"	0:55
20.	"Ferry Fight"	3:31
21.	"Agent Of M.E.O.W.S."	0:45
22.	"Taking Care Of Diggs"	2:04
23.	"Chinatown"	1:03
24.	"In Between Homes / M.E.O.W.S."	3:02
25.	"Life's A Bear"	1:58
26.	"Tank Of Doom"	4:46
27.	"Chuck Gets Free"	0:44
28.	"Cat's Cradle"	3:26
29.	"Termination"	2:20
30.	"Call Of The Wild"	1:09
31.	"Amazing Finish"	1:01
32.	"A New Home / New Mission"	2:19
33.	"Tinkles Is Back!"	1:02
34.	"Disco Kitty"	0:34
35.	"M.E.O.W.S. Jam - (Bonus Track)"	3:03
Total length:		63:49

=== Credits ===
- Executive Producer: Robert Townson
- Additional Music / Score Producer: Philip White
- Score Engineer: Jeff Vaughn
- Orchestrators: Andrew Kinney, Dana Niu, Larry Rench, Gernot Wolfgang, Brandon Roberts, Marcus Trumpp
- Performed by: Hollywood Studio Symphony
- Contractor: David Low
- Programming: Michael Neilson, Kaveh Cohen, Nicholas Fevola, Corey A. Jackson
- Music Preparation: Steven Juliani Music
- Assistants to Christopher Lennertz: Andrew Skrabutenas, Drew Silverstein
- Score Album Coordinator: Nicholas Kraft
- Mastered by: Patricia Sullivan Fourstar

== Release ==
Cats & Dogs: The Revenge of Kitty Galore premiered at the Grauman's Chinese Theatre on July 25, 2010, and was theatrically released five days later in the United States, by Warner Bros. Pictures. The initial American theatrical release of the film was preceded by the 3D animated short film Coyote Falls, starring Wile E. Coyote and the Road Runner.

=== Home media ===
The film was released on DVD, Blu-ray and 3D Blu-ray on November 16, 2010.

== Reception ==
=== Box office ===
Cats & Dogs: The Revenge of Kitty Galore opened on July 30, 2010, and earned $4.2 million on opening day and $12.3 million on its opening weekend. It reached #5 at the box office and grossed an average of $3,314 from 3,705 theaters. In its second weekend, its drop was very similar to the first film, retreating 44% to $6.9 million to 7th place and lifting its total to $26.4 million in two weeks. It held better in its third weekend, dropping 39% to $4.2 million and remaining in the Top 10. It closed on October 21, 2010, after 84 days of release, earning $43.6 million in the US on an $85 million budget. It earned an additional $69 million overseas for a worldwide total of $112.5 million.

=== Critical response ===
On the review aggregator website Rotten Tomatoes, 13% of 98 critics' reviews are positive. The website's consensus reads: "Dull and unfunny, this inexplicable sequel offers little more than the spectacle of digitally rendered talking animals with celebrity voices." Metacritic, which uses a weighted average, assigned the film a score of 30 out of 100, based on 22 critics, indicating "generally unfavorable" reviews. Audiences polled by CinemaScore gave the film an average grade of "B−" on an A+ to F scale, down from the first film's "B+".

Joe Leydon of Variety called it "a faster, funnier follow-up" to the original film. Scott Tobias of The A.V. Club negatively reviewed the film's plot, saying that "it's still about a feline plot for world domination, and the slobbering secret agents who stand in the way." The film was nominated for a Golden Raspberry Award for "Worst Eye-Gouging Misuse of 3D", but it lost to The Last Airbender.

== Video game ==
A video game was developed by Engine Software and published by 505 Games and was released for the Nintendo DS on July 20, 2010.

== Sequel ==
A third installment and stand-alone sequel, titled Cats & Dogs 3: Paws Unite!, features a new storyline taking place 10 years after the events of the previous film. However, unlike the previous two, the third film has been released as a straight-to-video release on digital on September 15, 2020, and on DVD and Blu-ray on October 13. It is also the only film that does not have any of the original cast members from the previous films. The new voice cast includes Melissa Rauch, Max Greenfield and George Lopez. It was directed by Sean McNamara, co-produced by Andrew Lazar and David Fliegel, and written by Scott Bindley. It was distributed by Warner Bros. Home Entertainment. The film received a nationwide theatrical release in Australia on September 24, and in the United Kingdom on October 2.
