= Oink =

Oink commonly refers to the sound made by a pig.

Oink may also refer to:

- Oink! (computer game), a 1982 Apple II game by Beagle Bros Software
- Oink! (video game), a 1982 Atari 2600 game by Activision
- Oink (1995 film), a 1995 short film directed by Rand Ravich
- Oink (2022 film), a Dutch animated film by Masha Halberstad
- Oink! (comics), a comic printed in the U.K. during the 1980s
- Oink (payment service), a youth payments technology by Rego Payment Architectures, Inc.
- Oink (Pillow Pal), a Pillow Pal pig made by Ty, Inc.
- Oink: My Life with Mini-Pigs, a 2011 novel by Matt Whyman
- Oink the Seal, a seal cub character in the Stingray television series

== See also ==
- Oink's Pink Palace, a defunct BitTorrent tracker and music sharing community website
