= List of Life episodes =

The following is a list of episodes for Life, an American police drama television program created by Rand Ravich that aired for two seasons on NBC. It was produced by Universal Media Studios under the supervision of executive producers Rand Ravich, Far Shariat, David Semel, and Daniel Sackheim. Semel also directed the pilot.

The series stars Damian Lewis as Charlie Crews, a detective released from prison after serving twelve years for a crime he did not commit. Life premiered on September 26, 2007, on NBC and aired on Wednesday nights at 10 EST. On May 4, 2009, NBC announced Life would not be returning for a third season.

== Series overview ==
Season	Episodes	Originally released	
Season	Episodes	First released	Last released
1	11	September 26, 2007	December 5, 2007
2	21	September 29, 2008	April 8, 2009

== Episodes ==
=== Season 1 (2007) ===
No. overall	No. in season	Title	Directed by	Written by	Original release date	U.S. viewers (millions)
1	1	"Merit Badge" "Pilot: Merit Badge"	David Semel	Rand Ravich	September 26, 2007	10.15
The pilot introduces us to Detective Charlie Crews and the painful cobwebs of his past as he returns to a world that has moved on without him. His appreciation for the details offers him a unique insight into crime solving. Also, his newfound Life reminds us of all the little things we easily take for granted.
2	2	"Tear Asunder"	Daniel Sackheim	Rand Ravich	October 3, 2007	8.80
When a new bride is murdered her husband becomes the prime suspect. Crews has his doubts and is determined to help, not wanting to send an innocent man to prison. Crews goes back to the crime scene that put him in prison and discovers a break in his own case.
3	3	"Let Her Go"	Lawrence Trilling	Glen Mazzara	October 10, 2007	8.14
A husband and wife are victims of a carjacking which ends in the wife being murdered. Crews and Reese become suspicious of the husband when he refuses to identify the suspect and they have to let him go free. Crews goes to see the detective that handled his case.
4	4	"What They Saw"	David Straiton	Jonathan Shapiro	October 17, 2007	7.66
A gay marriage is ended after one partner is found dead in the couple's home. Crews finds a homeless man living behind the house, whom Reese takes into custody for the murder. Crews and Reese try to determine what really happened at the house only to find the case goes beyond simple murder.
5	5	"The Fallen Woman"	Tony Wharmby	Rand Ravich	October 24, 2007	6.85
A woman is killed wearing an angel costume after being thrown from a hotel window. Crews and Reese must figure out who the woman is and why she was in a hotel room that was not registered. They find out the victim had been involved in a "Natasha" scam involving Russian women who seduce rich men, marry them, and the husbands are forced to make payments to the leader of the scam or lose their bride and dignity by harsh means. The main problem Crews and Reese have is they have difficulties connecting the murder to the leader. Crews is given a tip about an armed robbery that might be connected with his former partner.
6	6	"Powerless"	John Dahl	Marjorie David	October 31, 2007	5.72
While at an AA meeting Reese believes she hears someone admit to a rape. She finds herself in danger as she investigates further. Crews goes on a stakeout with Lt. Davis and learns some surprising information about his former partner, Bobby Stark.
7	7	"A Civil War"	Daniel Sackheim	Rafael Alvarez	November 7, 2007	6.41
A hate crime turns out to be a young man's cry for help. Crews and Reese investigate a case where two Persian-Americans are killed and a third is kidnapped. They believe they are dealing with a hate crime so they race to meet the kidnappers' demands before it's too late. Meanwhile, Crews dreams about solar panels and decides to buy a solar farm. Ted starts to question Crews' impulsive nature.
8	8	"Farthingale"	Peter Markle	Rand Ravich	November 14, 2007	6.94
Crews and Reese investigate a gas explosion in which an IRS agent leading a double life is the victim. What makes the case more difficult is the victim has two wives and acted as if he were a top secret spy for the US government. Crews and Reese try to determine the motive behind the killing and find who rigged the stove to explode. Crews is once again a suspect in a murder investigation when the lead detective who handled his case is found murdered.
9	9	"Serious Control Issues"	Marcos Siega	Laurie Arent	November 28, 2007	6.27
When a runaway girl is found dead underneath a freeway overpass, Crews and Reese are struck by the death scene. Just when they are close to capturing the killer, they realize they've stumbled on another crime, a kidnapping from 12 years ago. Meanwhile, Crews takes action towards the case against him.
10	10	"Dig a Hole"	Daniel Sackheim	Rand Ravich	December 3, 2007	6.61
Crews and Reese receive a case where the body of a Zen instructor is found in a construction site. What makes the case more interesting is the fact the body was buried alive. Crews and Reese speak with past students and find out what happened to the instructor. Crews received a confidential file on Jack Reese and believes he discovered the killer in his case.
11	11	"Fill It Up"	Daniel Sackheim	Rand Ravich	December 5, 2007	7.64
Crews locates the killer in his case and finds out exactly what happened the night his friends died. Crews also finds out more information about Jack Reese. While Crews is away, Reese is left the task of finding a gun used in a murder.

=== Season 2 (2008–09) ===
No. overall	No. in season	Title	Directed by	Written by	Original release date	U.S. viewers (millions)
12	1	"Find Your Happy Place"	Daniel Sackheim	Rand Ravich	September 29, 2008	6.92
We meet John Armstrong, a man who works with greeting cards at a stationery store, and who is suspected of murdering people by putting them in trunks and letting them suffocate. Also, an ice cream truck driver sells more than ice cream from his truck.
13	2	"Everything… All the Time"	David Straiton	Rand Ravich	October 3, 2008	5.78
Crews and Reese investigate the murder of a man found beaten and tied to a chair at the bottom of a pool. While at first it appears to be gang related the investigation leads to an underground party circuit. Reese's father goes to Ted to see what Crews knows about him. Charlie asks his ex-wife to talk to Rachel the only survivor of the family he was accused of killing.
14	3	"The Business of Miracles"	Elodie Keene	Jonathan Shapiro	October 6, 2008	5.44
The body of a cancer research scientist is found frozen, at first Crews and Reese think it was an animal rights group, but as they look into the scientist's personal life they aren't so sure. Crews tries to prove that Jack Reese was involved in him going to prison.
15	4	"Not for Nothing"	Peter Markle	Scott M. Gimple	October 10, 2008	4.92
When a university's social psychology experiment using students in the roles of inmates and prison guards (based loosely on the Stanford prison experiment) goes seriously wrong, Crews and Reese are called on to find out who murdered one of the guards.
16	5	"Crushed"	Holly Dale	Marjorie David	October 17, 2008	5.93
A worker at a tow/wrecking yard is killed on site. The investigation has the team question fellow workers as well as the family of Arthur Grey, an ex-badass who cleaned up his life and now is a music mogul. The episode will also focus on the widow of a police officer who was accidentally killed 20 years ago. The widow was told it was suicide but there is more to this death. Some students who attend Ted's business school class are more interested in learning how to cheat the system than following the laws and rules.
17	6	"Did You Feel That?"	Tucker Gates	Jonathan Shapiro & Scott M. Gimple	October 24, 2008	5.49
During an earthquake, Crews and Reese are looking for an escaped murderer which they had arrested a year earlier. At first they are trying to protect him but the detectives later learn that he is not the victim. Meanwhile, Ted suffers an injury from the earthquake and makes a call for help.
18	7	"Jackpot"	Daniel Sackheim	Rand Ravich	November 5, 2008	5.82
A woman is found in a pool of blood sitting at a table with a romantic dinner set for two. The investigation leads Crews and Reese to a support group for lottery winners full of eccentric characters. The detectives soon discover lottery winners often suffer broken psyches after suddenly becoming richer than they ever could have imagined. Meanwhile, Rachel refuses to tell Crews anything about her family's murder or about Jack Reese, however, the two unexpectedly realize they share a common bond.
19	8	"Black Friday"	David Straiton	Story by : Marjorie David; Teleplay by : Wendolyn Calhoun & Melissa Scrivner	November 12, 2008	5.83
When a murder takes place in a mall on the biggest shopping day of the year Charlie Crews and Dani Reese end up searching for more than just the killer. In a moment of confusion the body disappears, Crews and Reese are then faced with the task of tracking down both the body and the killer in one of the largest malls in America on one of the busiest shopping days of the year. Meanwhile, Crews gets an unexpected visit from an FBI agent.
20	9	"Badge Bunny"	Jay Torres	Rand Ravich	November 19, 2008	5.32
When a drug dealer and an elementary school teacher are found dead in a bad part of town, it looks like the typical drug deal gone bad. The investigation takes a turn when Crews and Reese discover the dead teacher was a Badge Bunny, a term used amongst police officers for women who only date cops. The detectives soon realize the killer could be one of their own. Meanwhile, Crews and Jennifer address their complicated relationship and Ted has trouble retaining students in his business class.
21	10	"Evil… And His Brother Ziggy"	Adam Arkin	Far Shariat	December 3, 2008	8.10
A sheriff's deputy is found dead on an Indian reservation, Crews and Reese are in the middle of a turf war between Tribal police and the county sheriff's department. The team learns that the victim was not well-liked on the reservation. Meanwhile, Crews attends a fundraiser thrown by Mickey Rayborn, one of Crews' suspects involved in the conspiracy against him.
22	11	"Canyon Flowers"	Paul McCrane	Joe Hortua	December 10, 2008	5.46
A food bank deliveryman is found dead, in a suburban home. The bizarre thing is that he was buried with flower petals around his head and from a distance the victim looks like a large flower. Crews and Reese believe that the murder is connected to a 70s cult. Meanwhile, Crews confronts Mickey Rayborn about his role in the conspiracy.
23	12	"Trapdoor"	Elodie Keene	Rand Ravich	December 17, 2008	5.19
The team investigates the murder of three Russians that are linked to the Russian mobster Roman Nevikov and Crews also thinks that he is linked to his own case. Meanwhile, Crews shoots an intruder who turns out to be someone he knows and Reese starts drinking again.
24	13	"Re-Entry"	John Behring	Far Shariat	February 4, 2009	6.76
The team investigates the death of a retired NASA pilot in mid-flight. The suspects are the pilot's son, and the pilot's business partner. An important fact in this case is that the pilot was going to pay the Russians $35 million to take him into space. Meanwhile, Tidwell tries to help Crews remember who shot him.
25	14	"Mirror Ball"	Fred Keller	Rand Ravich	February 11, 2009	4.72
The team investigates the death of a heavy metal lead singer, who was suffocated to death. They question all the other band members, and learn that the previous lead singer of that group had problems with the dead singer, after he was kicked out of the band. When they get the former singer; he seems to have a legitimate alibi, but then the teams stumbles upon a homeless man who appears to be a groupie who could be the murderer. Meanwhile, Crews learns that his father's wedding to Olivia has been called off.
26	15	"I Heart Mom"	Daniel Sackheim	R.J. Colleary	February 18, 2009	5.16
A man is found beaten and shot dead with a mouth full of money in a house with no roof. Crews and Reese begin their investigation and discover the victim was running an elaborate construction scam that left his clients without roofs or money. While interviewing the duped customers, they meet an eccentric man with a violent streak and the intimidating son of an old woman with a long rap sheet. The detectives work to figure out if either of these men could be the murderer. Meanwhile, Crews has a confrontation with Mickey Rayborn which sheds some light on the conspiracy against him.
27	16	"Hit Me Baby"	Elodie Keene	Rand Ravich	February 25, 2009	4.89
Crews investigates a brutally murdered man, and it leads him all the way to Claudia; an uncatchable hit woman. Meanwhile, Dani is polygraphed by the FBI before joining what is billed as a Task Force and a woman cons her way into Crews' house and photographs his investigation wall.
28	17	"Shelf Life"	Adam Arkin	Story by : Wendolyn Calhoun; Teleplay by : Marjorie David & Melissa Scrivner	March 11, 2009	5.21
Crews and Stark investigate the death of a soldier who was stabbed in the chest while on leave in Los Angeles. Their quest for the killer leads them into a world of extreme corporate and political power. Meanwhile, Crews makes a shocking discovery with the help of the late Mickey Rayborn’s security specialist Amanda Puryer.
29	18	"3 Women"	Peter Markle	David Manson	March 18, 2009	4.22
Crews receives an over-dramatic new partner. Meanwhile, Reese isn't quite finding things as expected over in the FBI. Guest star Gabrielle Union.
30	19	"5 Quarts"	Paul McCrane	Jonathan Shapiro	March 25, 2009	4.32
Crews digs into Dani's operation at the FBI while investigating a coroner's murder. Ted reconnects with his daughter. Guest star Gabrielle Union.
31	20	"Initiative 38"	John Behring	Rand Ravich & Far Shariat	April 1, 2009	5.70
Crews and Seever investigate the death of a California State Representative who is shot and killed in her home. The detectives discover the representative was the force behind a political initiative that would put a comprehensive ban on handguns and cost a gun manufacturing company millions in profit. Crews and Seever work to prove that the representative's political ambitions may have gotten her killed. Meanwhile, Crews questions what Reese might be doing with the FBI. Features the Earlimart song "The World" in the televised version only.
32	21	"One"	Fred Keller	Rand Ravich	April 8, 2009	4.50
Crews learns shocking details about the conspiracy against him when he searches for Reese, who has gone missing while on loan to the FBI. This is the season and series finale.

== Ratings ==
Life : U.S. viewers per episode (millions)

Season	Episode number																				
Season	1	2	3	4	5	6	7	8	9	10	11	12	13	14	15	16	17	18	19	20	21
1	10.15	8.80	8.14	7.66	6.85	5.72	6.41	6.94	6.27	6.61	7.64	–									
2	6.92	5.78	5.44	4.92	5.93	5.49	5.82	5.83	5.32	8.10	5.46	5.19	6.76	4.72	5.16	4.89	5.21	4.22	4.32	5.70	4.50

Audience measurement performed by Nielsen Media Research
