= Second Chance (2016 TV series) =

American science fiction crime drama television series

- Also known as: Frankenstein; The Frankenstein Code; Lookinglass
- Genre: Drama; Crime; Science fiction
- Created by: Rand Ravich
- Starring: Robert Kazinsky; Dilshad Vadsaria; Adhir Kalyan; Ciara Bravo; Vanessa Lengies; Tim DeKay
- Composer: John Paesano
- Country of origin: United States
- Original language: English
- No. of seasons: 1
- No. of episodes: 11

Production
- Executive producers: Rand Ravich; Howard Gordon; Donald Todd; Brad Turner; Hugh Fitzpatrick; Richard Hatem; Gwendolyn Parker
- Camera setup: Single-camera
- Production companies: Teakwood Lane Productions; Kara Inc.; 20th Century Fox Television

Original release
- Network: Fox
- Release: December 25, 2015 – March 25, 2016

Second Chance is an American science fiction crime drama television series created by Rand Ravich. It is inspired by the 1818 novel Frankenstein; or, The Modern Prometheus by Mary Shelley; Frankenstein was an early title. The show debuted online on December 25, 2015, and started broadcasting January 13, 2016, on Fox. On January 29, 2016, Second Chance was moved to Fridays at 9 p.m. ET/PT, following poor ratings in its first two episodes, swapping time slots and days with Hell's Kitchen.

On May 12, 2016, Fox cancelled the series after one season.

== Premise ==
The series follows the life of Jimmy Pritchard, a 75-year-old former King County, Washington sheriff (Philip Baker Hall) who was morally corrupt and eventually disgraced and forced to retire. After he is murdered, Pritchard is brought back to life in the improved body of a younger man (Robert Kazinsky) by billionaire tech-genius twins Mary (Dilshad Vadsaria) and Otto Goodwin (Adhir Kalyan). However, despite having a new life and a chance to relive his life and find a new purpose, the temptations that led to his career being tarnished continue to haunt him.

== Cast and characters ==
=== Main ===
- Robert Kazinsky as Jimmy Pritchard
- Dilshad Vadsaria as Mary Goodwin, Otto's twin sister, co-founder of Lookinglass
- Adhir Kalyan as Otto Goodwin, Mary's twin brother, co-founder of Lookinglass
- Ciara Bravo as Gracie Pritchard, Duval's daughter and Jimmy's granddaughter
- Tim DeKay as Duval Pritchard, Jimmy's son, an FBI agent
- Vanessa Lengies as Alexa, Mary's assistant

=== Guest ===
- Philip Baker Hall as old Jimmy Pritchard
- Amanda Detmer as Helen, Jimmy's daughter and Duval's sister.
- Scott Menville as Arthur (voice), the Goodwins' computer.
- Rod Hallett as Hart Watkins.
- Adan Canto as Connor Graff
- Diana Bang as Emma Peng

== Episodes ==
No.	Title	Directed by	Written by	Original release date	Prod. code	US viewers (millions)
1	"A Suitable Donor"	Michael Cuesta	Rand Ravich	December 25, 2015 (on demand); January 13, 2016 (broadcast)	1AYF01	4.71
Jimmy Pritchard is a 75-year-old former sheriff who was disgraced for fabricating evidence, something he justified as necessary to protect his town, and has a tense relationship with his son Duval, an FBI agent. After being murdered by men who broke into his son's home, he is secretly restored to life, youth, and even given superhuman strength by the genius tech billionaire twins Otto and Mary, the founders of Lookinglass. After realizing what happened to him, he runs away, still under the twins' constant surveillance. When he recognizes one of his murderers as his son's FBI partner John Strayburn, he goes to warn Duval, but has to return to his tank to stay alive. Mary starts receiving cells from Jimmy to fight her cancer and helps him by compiling evidence about John, which Jimmy hands to Duval the next time he is out of the tank. Duval is kidnapped after notifying his corrupt chief about John and Jimmy is able to save his son just before it is tank time again.
2	"One More Notch"	Tim Busfield	Rand Ravich	January 20, 2016	1AYF02	3.75
During the blackout caused by Jimmy's resurrection, two murderous convicts escaped from prison. He feels responsible, so he tracks them down with Mary's help. He also introduces himself to Duval as Duval's paternal half-brother and offers his help in fighting the crime in the city.
3	"From Darkness, the Sun"	Adam Kane	Donald Todd	January 29, 2016	1AYF03	2.15
An FBI scientist tells Duval that Jim's DNA sample is a familial match for him, but she's puzzled by the transgenic mutations in the sample. Meanwhile, an environmental protest against a coal plant turns deadly when the protesters are killed with an axe. Some of the surveillance footage is missing and Jim thinks the company's CEO, Duke Davis, took it based on his previous interactions with him. Mary offers to help him and offers Davis Lookinglass' help to update his security, which he refuses. Meanwhile, Duval takes advantage of their absence to interrogate Otto about Jim. Arthur warns Mary and Jim manages to distract Duval by offering him information about the case. Back at Davis' home, it is revealed that the killer is his teenage son, Asher. With Mary's help, Jim and Duval discover several violent incidents in Asher's past that Davis hid with his money, but Asher has an alibi, Bobbi, a girl who works at the Davis' country club. Jim follows her to Asher's party where he manages to steal Bobbi's wallet. Thanks to its contents, he and Duval realize she's leaving town. They follow her to Davis' jet, where Jim finds Duke fatally stabbed and Asher wielding a katana. Jim and Asher fight and Jim manages to knock him down thanks to Duval's timely arrival. Bobbi shoots at Duval, but Jim protects him by jumping in front of the bullets. Jim asks him to take him to Mary Goodwin and, in the car, tells Duval he's sorry for not being a good father. When they arrive back at the Goodwins' house, Mary finally tells him the truth about Jim.
4	"Admissions"	Brad Turner	Gwendolyn M. Parker	February 5, 2016	1AYF04	2.20
Duval is having a hard time accepting that Jim is his father. Following Mary's advice, Jim decides to reopen the only case on which Duval ever asked for his help: a teenager named Kevin Whitfield who OD'd on heroin. Duval thought there was more to it, but Jim told him to let it go. With the twins' help, Jim finds Kevin's notebook, filled with chess movements, and Arthur connects Kevin to three more teenage geniuses who OD'd on heroin in the area within the last 18 months. Jim tells Duval, now officially on the case, that Otto discovered all the victims had applied to Seattle State University. They talk with the school's therapist, Dr. Liz Kenyon, who, unknown to them, is the killer. Duval discovers that Dr. Kenyon is a former piano prodigy who came under the influence of a man called Emile Sayles, who pushed her until she had a breakdown at 16. Jim thinks Sayles attacked Dr. Kenyon at her office, but Duval informs him that Emile has been dead since 1997: she's the only killer, it's all in her head, and now they don't know where she is. After Mary unintentionally inspires Jim, he and Duval work out Dr. Kenyon has gone to her old middle school. They arrive there just in time to save her latest victim, though Jim has to reveal his super-strength to Duval in order to get to her. It turns out Dr. Kenyon was killing the teenagers to "protect" them from Sayles. Duval asks Jim to give him some time to process everything before he gets too close to Gracie. Jim asks Mary for a favor and gets her to put him into the FBI server as Duval's confidential informant, without telling Duval first.
5	"Scratch That Glitch"	Felix Alacla	Richard Hatem	February 12, 2016	1AYF05	2.13
During a TV interview for the launch of Lookinglass' new operating system, Cobra 9, Mary is ambushed when news of her blood cancer leaks and, afterwards, her car is run off the road by paparazzi. Mary's assistant, Alexa, shows her an online dead pool where someone just bet on her dying today. Jim and Duval find out the car was shot at and, while Jim tracks down a paparazzi and discovers their suspect has a cobra tattoo on his left forearm, Duval arranges to get himself assigned to the case. An unusually weak Jim gets a bad beating and ends up in the hospital, where he hallucinates his old self. He manages to flee the hospital and sends the message to Duval through Arthur. Duval receives it, but there are several Cobra 9 software developers with cobra tattoos. They tell Duval about an angry former developer, Malcolm Sprague, who has filed lawsuits against Lookinglass. With Jim in the tank, Otto discovers his endocrine system is failing because of a glitch in the code he wrote. Malcolm kidnaps one of the coders, Kelly, and offers to trade her for Mary. While Duval accompanies Mary to the meet, Otto uses an adrenaline shot to stimulate Jim, who catches up with them. Duval and Jim ask Mary to stay in the car. Jim attacks Malcolm after he shoots Duval, but he's still weak and can't stop him. Mary finds and frees Kelly. Malcolm is about to shoot them, but Duval shoots him first. Otto finds out that Jim's genetic code is being rewritten by his own body. He also gives Mary the good news that her treatment with Jim's blood is working. Absent: Ciara Bravo as Gracie Pritchard
6	"Palimpsest"	Sarah Pia Anderson	Allison Miller	February 19, 2016	1AYF06	1.98
A killer that mutilates his victims beyond recognition is on the loose. In the meantime, Otto becomes suspicious of the growing bond between Pritchard and his sister, and considers finding another donor. Absent: Ciara Bravo as Gracie Pritchard
7	"That Time in the Car"	John Stuart Scott	Far Shariat	February 26, 2016	1AYF07	1.78
Duval's sister and Pritchard's daughter, Helen, is dating a parole officer named Wally, with whom she was linked while they were both in high school. Pritchard's arrogance towards Wally hasn't changed since then, but Pritchard can't let his previous history with Wally be determined by Helen and, much to the humiliation of Pritchard and Duval, they identify Wally as being pressured by a prisoner to carry out a complicated prison break and must team up with Wally to stop the prisoner from bringing about his grand plans. At the same time, Alexa speaks out to Mary about her mistrust of Pritchard, and Otto is heartbroken over the anniversary of his parents' death. Absent: Ciara Bravo as Gracie Pritchard
8	"May Old Acquaintance Be Forgot"	Jennifer Lynch	Gabriel Llanas	March 4, 2016	1AYF08	2.15
Pritchard's past comes back to haunt him. Twenty years ago, Pritchard covered up a crime committed by a drug lord's girlfriend, who happened to be his confidential informant at the time. Now, rather than staying on the right side of the law after Pritchard assisted her in getting away with the crime, she has turned herself into a dominant drug dealer, so Pritchard is insistent on setting things straight. Meanwhile, Mary's cancer is in remission, but she and Otto are fighting over Pritchard and Otto wants to find a new blood donor for her. Also, Gracie begins dating an older guy.
9	"When You Have to Go There, They Have to Take You In"	Kate Dennis	Rand Ravich	March 11, 2016	1AYF09	1.88
Pritchard and Duval join forces to track down a serial killer, and Alexa and Connor struggle to get hold of key technology from Lookinglass. Meanwhile, the bond between Mary and Pritchard has become stronger, but Otto goes to great lengths to make sure Mary will always be part of his life, and Gracie is doubtful that there is more to Pritchard than what he has told to her.
10	"Geworfenheit"	Paul Edwards	Richard Hatem & Allison Miller	March 18, 2016	1AYF10	1.91
Pritchard and Duval investigate who Albert Lin really is, the man who invented him, and try to understand how he is involved in a series of deadly murders. The investigation drives a wedge between Mary and Otto. Otto must determine if he will abandon Mary and destroy everything they have built, including Pritchard, and align himself with Connor Graff. Shortly after Otto shuts everything down and leaves, Pritchard and Mary discuss what's next. Pritchard goes to meet up with his family while Mary promises to try to find Otto. When he arrives at his son's house, he finds Gracie is missing. Duval immediately begins working on finding her, but Pritchard suggests she's equipped to make her own decisions.
11	"Gelassenheit"	Brad Turner	Rand Ravich & Howard Gordon	March 25, 2016	1AYF11	2.09
In the season finale, Pritchard and Duval have to race against the clock to rescue Gracie from Connor and Otto's life-threatening experiment. Unfortunately, time is running out for Pritchard immediately and, since there is no tank, he cannot regenerate. Meanwhile, Mary, with the help of Alexa, unlocks the code to save Pritchard's life before it's too late. Otto battles with his conscience and the outcomes that have changed lives forever.

== Production ==
The show was picked up by Fox to series as a last-minute addition to the lineup on May 8, 2015, first titled The Frankenstein Code, with the series being set in Los Angeles, before undergoing name changes to Lookinglass in August and finally once again to Second Chance in November; the setting was also changed to King County, Washington, as well. In October, the original order was reduced to an 11-episode season.

== Critical reception ==
The show was met with an average response from critics. On Metacritic, it holds a rating of 47/100 based on 18 reviews. On Rotten Tomatoes, it holds an approval rating of 30% based on 27 reviews, with an average rating of 4.2/10. The critics' consensus reads: "Second Chance boasts a few interesting ideas and Robert Kazinsky's game performance, but there aren't enough functioning parts in what's ultimately yet another mediocre take on the Frankenstein myth."

== See also ==
- Now and Again
- Self/less
- Seconds
