= Vadsar, Gandhinagar =

Vadsar
- Village
- Location in Gujarat, India Vadsar (India)
- Coordinates: 23.1556088°N 72.4724133°E
- Country: India
- State: Gujarat
- District: Gandhinagar
- Subdistrict: Kalol

Population (2011)
  - Total: 7,406
- Time zone: UTC+05:30 (IST)
- Pincode: 382721
- Vehicle registration: GJ

Vadsar is a village located in the Gandhinagar district of Gujarat, India. The latitude 23.1556088 and longitude 72.4724133 are the geocoordinate of the village. The population was 7,406 at the 2011 Indian census.

The nearest railway station is the Khodiyar railway station which is located around 7.8 km from the village. Sardar Vallabhbhai Patel International Airport, at 8.2 km, is the closest airport. Vadsar is located around 22.7 km from its district headquarters of Gandhinagar. Schools near Vadsar are: the High School of Jaspur, the Khodiyar Primary School, the Shreemati J.M.G. High School and the Kapuri School Government, Temple in Vadsar village is Vadsariya GANAPATI.

== See also ==
- Vadsaria
