= Loucas George =

American television director and producer

Loucas George is an American television director and producer.

== Biography ==
Loucas is a member of the Directors Guild of America and has been a producer on a number of shows including Commander in Chief, Ed, The O.C., Early Edition, 12 Miles of Bad Road and Life.

== Personal life ==
Loucas and his wife have two sons.
