= Crisis (TV series) =

- Genre: Action; Drama; Thriller
- Created by: Rand Ravich
- Starring: Dermot Mulroney; Rachael Taylor; Lance Gross; James Lafferty; Max Martini; Michael Beach; Stevie Lynn Jones; Halston Sage; Max Schneider; Joshua Erenberg; Gillian Anderson
- Country of origin: United States
- Original language: English
- No. of seasons: 1
- No. of episodes: 13

Production
- Executive producers: Rand Ravich; Phillip Noyce; Far Shariat
- Production locations: Chicago, Illinois
- Camera setup: Single-camera
- Running time: 43 minutes
- Production companies: 20th Century Fox Television; Ravich-Shariat Productions

Original release
- Network: NBC
- Release: March 16 – June 21, 2014

Crisis is an American action thriller drama television series created by Rand Ravich for 20th Century Fox Television. It aired on NBC as part of the 2013–14 United States network television schedule and the mid-season entry. The series stars Dermot Mulroney, Rachael Taylor, Lance Gross, James Lafferty, Max Martini, Michael Beach, Stevie Lynn Jones, Halston Sage, Max Schneider, Joshua Erenberg, and Gillian Anderson.

Crisis premiered on March 16, 2014. On May 9, 2014, midway through its first season, NBC canceled Crisis. The network broadcast the remaining episodes starting May 25, with the two-hour series finale airing on June 21.

== Premise ==
During a school trip, students of Ballard High School, attended by the children of Washington, D.C.'s elite, including the President's son, are the victims of an ambush. A national crisis begins and Secret Service agent Marcus Finley finds himself at the center of it on his first day on the job. FBI agent Susie Dunn also discovers her "niece", the daughter of CEO Meg Fitch, is among the kidnapped children.

== Cast ==
=== Main ===
- Dermot Mulroney as Francis Gibson, an ex-CIA analyst who was betrayed by the government
- Rachael Taylor as FBI Special Agent Susie Dunn
- Lance Gross as Secret Service Special Agent Marcus Finley, a rookie who was betrayed by his partner
- James Lafferty as Mr. Nash, teacher at Ballard High School
- Max Martini as Koz, a mercenary hired by Gibson
- Michael Beach as William Olsen, Director of the FBI
- Stevie Lynn Jones as Beth Ann Gibson, the daughter of Francis, with whom she has a strained relationship
- Halston Sage as Amber Fitch, Susie's biological daughter who was raised by Meg as her own
- Max Schneider as Ian Martinez, Beth's best friend
- Gillian Anderson as Meg Fitch, the CEO of an international IT company and Susie's older sister

=== Recurring ===
- David Andrews as Secret Service Special Agent Hurst, head of the White House protective detail. He was working for Gibson under duress, until being shot and killed by Kyle DeVore, who believed that Hurst had betrayed him.
- John Allen Nelson as President DeVore
- David Chisum as Noah Fitch, husband of Meg Fitch
- Adam Scott Miller as Kyle DeVore, the president's teenage son
- Brandon Ruiter as Luke Putnam, one of the teenagers abducted and Kyle's friend
- Shavon Kirksey as Sloan Yarrow, another of the abducted teenagers and Amber's best friend
- Rammel Chan as Jin Liao, one of the teenagers who believes Kyle is the reason for everyone being kidnapped
- Jessica Dean Turner as Dutton, a Communications Gunwoman and Maryland State Police officer working for Gibson
- Mark Valley as Gabe Widener, Director of the CIA
- Rod Hallett as Dr. Jonas Clarenbach, a scientist who once worked in the pharmaceuticals division at Meg's company, and is also Meg's former lover
- Joshua Erenberg as Anton Roth, an advanced student from the school who is saved from the initial ambush by Agent Finley
- John Henry Canavan as Morgan Roth, a scientist and father to Anton Roth

== Development and production ==
NBC bought Rand Ravich's script with a put pilot commitment in August 2012. In January 2013, NBC green-lit the production of a pilot episode. Scenes of Ballard High School were filmed at Northside College Prep in Chicago. On May 12, 2013, the series was placed on the network's 2013–14 schedule. It premiered on March 16, 2014.

On November 1, 2013, after filming was completed for the sixth episode, production of the series was put on an unscheduled, week-long hiatus. The pause in production was attributed to fears that subsequent episodes were veering too far away from the tone of the pilot, which received very positive early reviews. The break was supposed to be used to give writers time to re-work scripts and to re-shoot certain scenes for previously finished episodes. Filming later resumed.

== Episodes ==
No.	Title	Directed by	Written by	Original release date	Prod. code	US viewers (millions)
1	"Pilot"	Phillip Noyce	Rand Ravich	March 16, 2014	1AWN79	6.53
The President's son and other children of Washington's elite, along with chaperone-father Francis Gibson, get taken from a bus on a rural road. The elaborate plan is effective until student Anton Roth is rescued by injured Secret Service Agent Marcus Finley, who has been shot by a fellow agent, and they escape into the woods. The remaining hostages are taken to a house, where Gibson plots to take a gun from a kidnapper. This is also part of the plan, as he is injured and taken to a room where he is revealed to be the mastermind with a detailed notebook. Even though they had last parted on bad terms, FBI Agent Susie Dunn and her CEO sister Meg Fitch work together. Fitch's daughter is among the kidnapped and it is revealed the girl was actually Dunn's child. Gibson is shown as a CIA analyst bent on revenge for being betrayed by the government. His plan is to test the parents' loyalties to either their children or their country.
2	"If You Are Watching This, I Am Dead"	Peter Markle	Rand Ravich	March 23, 2014	1AWN01	5.14
Meg is given a task to collect a large amount of money in order to get Amber released, which is part of a bigger plot to bait the FBI. Dunn and Finley are teamed up to track down the location of the missing Secret Service agent. They ultimately arrive at the Pakistani embassy and encounter an ambassador whose child is among the kidnapped. At the mansion, the captors test the students by giving them a chance to be discovered. Gibson returns to his traumatized daughter.
3	"What Was Done to You"	Mark Piznarski	Rand Ravich	March 30, 2014	1AWN06	4.34
The President's Chief of Staff and a local car dealer become the next targeted parents. They must torture General Osborne to learn the location of classified documents about "Operation Lenox", which ended in a massacre. The general eventually says a video is in a CIA vault, and then Gibson, via earpiece, convinces him to kill himself. It is also revealed that Gibson got the idea for the kidnapping after seeing parents pay tens of thousands of dollars at a school charity auction for their kids' "artwork" and a mission arose. He spent the last 20 years planning coups for the CIA, and he decided to make the parents his weapons in breaking the CIA the way they broke him.
4	"We Were Supposed to Help Each Other"	Fred Keller	Rand Ravich	April 6, 2014	1AWN02	4.47
A Congressman and his wife Marie must infiltrate the CIA building with a bomb vest strapped to one of them. Dunn and Finley realize that most of the recent attacks were geared toward the CIA. Marie volunteers to wear the vest as a distraction, while her husband follows Gibson's orders to run the thumb drive with a video file away from the CIA building and upload it via cell phone. The video, which had been stolen from a CIA vault by another parent who is a Senator and had CIA access, shows footage from the Lenox operation. The bomb strapped to Marie turns out to be fake, but the Congressman is killed by the CIA. At the mansion, the children are tasked with packing bundles of money, the 20 million dollars in ransom cash paid by Meg Fitch. Later, Meg is reviewing evidence with Susie when she recognizes a man in the background of a surveillance photo at the Pakistani Embassy, saying, "He used to work for me."
5	"Designated Allies"	Christine Moore	Far Shariat	April 13, 2014	1AWN03	4.07
CIA Director Widener tells Olsen that the two soldiers they found were presumed dead, but now must be taken to a certain doctor. Gibson (with voice distorted) calls his wife Janice, and instructs her to meet with Widener. He says she must poison Widener to get Beth Ann back. Widener sees through the attempt and dumps Janice's poisoned tea down the drain, while Gibson reveals he was just testing whether Janice would break or not. He then watches via camera in Janice's home as Widener comforts her, then kisses her. A doctor tells Dunn and Finley that the two soldiers were in a medically-induced coma. One awakes and tells a story of the massacre of women and children in a "training exercise", and he pleads that he doesn't want to go on the next mission. Not wanting the soldiers fall into CIA hands, Dunn and Finley create a diversion to take the soldiers themselves, but the doctor drugs them. They are able to turn the tables when they come-to, ultimately finding through Meg that the doctor's real name is Jonas Clarenbach, who ran a pharmaceutical division at her company that had a defense contract. Jonas is seen calling Widener from a pay phone, saying he never wanted to be involved. The two agents raid Clarenbach's home and find a photo of him with Gibson and the two soldiers. Dunn wonders aloud if Gibson is a hostage or the kidnapper. Gibson is able to abduct the soldiers through Koz, who poses as a police officer warning the transporting CIA agents of a downed power line. At the compound, Kyle demands to see Hearst, still convinced that his family's personal security agent would never be involved in this kidnapping. Gibson threatens the life of Hearst and his daughter to get Hearst to tell Kyle his security detail was "just a job" and that the kidnapping is his new job.
6	"Here He Comes"	Nick Gomez	Sam Ernst & Jim Dunn	April 20, 2014	1AWN04	3.73
Dunn and Finley know that the kidnappers are monitoring parent meetings in the Ballard school auditorium, and devise a plan to reveal the location of a CIA file that Dunn is holding. The ruse works, as Gibson sends Koz to take photos of the file's contents and transmit them. He also convinces Koz to stay on the project by giving him the opportunity to kill the FBI agents who shot his brother. Dunn and Finley tail Koz to a gas station, which they find odd because he would certainly have fueled up before his latest task. They investigate the now-abandoned station, finding nothing. Meanwhile, a drone has tailed Koz's car to what they think is the kidnappers' hideout, and agents confirm that one of the Ballard school kids, Taylor Bennett, is inside. Storming the building, they find several mannequins but only two humans: Taylor and his father, whose assignment from Gibson was to take the place of Koz in the car. Dunn and Finley see Koz, who was hiding in an oil pit, emerge from the garage and leave in another car. Koz lures them to a building where a struggle ensues. Finley gains the upper hand, but Koz says he'll have to let him walk because he knows where there is a vehicle with one of the kidnapped children in the trunk. Meanwhile, Meg meets with Clarenbach. They discuss an affair they had, before moving on to the project Jonas was working on with Widener. Jonas begs Meg not to turn him over to Widener, but Meg reveals she has already done so for the sake of her daughter. Dunn and Finley return to the Ballard auditorium, and announce to Gibson's camera that they know about Widener's illicit operations with the drugged soldiers, and can help Gibson stop him.
7	"Homecoming"	Steven DePaul	Erik Oleson	April 27, 2014	1AWN05	4.01
Gibson contacts Dunn and Finley, and they plead with him to use them instead of parents, revealing they picked up a "Station Orange" code from the two soldiers. Gibson assigns them to retrieve a man from a certain house, and the agents find Widener's mysterious accomplice, Thomas Jefferson "TJS" Smith (Fred Dryer) awaiting them. Finley calls in some favors with the local police and fire departments to get TJS to leave, and they discover Jonas Clarenbach in the basement. Taking Clarenbach to their own hideout, they become targets for Widener and TJS. At Gibson's compound, one of the drugged soldiers awakes, just as Dutton deciphers the Station Orange code—it is the newly-drugged soldier's next orders: to free the hostages. Thayer, the awakened soldier, does major damage to Gibson's war room and takes out several henchmen. One of the fallen men dies in front of Kyle, who takes the man's gun and pockets it in view of Beth Ann. Thayer releases Hearst, who walks out clutching Gibson and pointing a gun to his head. Hearst calls out for Kyle, who shoots Hearst before he can reveal that Gibson is the mastermind. Koz shoots and kills Thayer despite Gibson's plea that he wanted the soldier alive. Just as Finley and Dunn revise their deal with Gibson, Dunn gets a call from TJS, who says he will kill Meg if they don't turn over Clarenbach.
8	"How Far Would You Go"	Sarah Pia Anderson	Dawn DeNoon	May 4, 2014	1AWN07	3.61
To get Jonas Clarenbach back for Widener, TJS abducts Meg and tries to make a deal with Agent Dunn for her sister's life. Finley has Clarenbach look at what the FBI currently has on the kidnapping, and Jonas is able to positively identify Gibson's hideout. With his hideout and team in shambles, Gibson vows to expose Widener before the kidnap operation is finished, and needs Clarenbach to do so. Finley and Clarenbach take off for the location, but Gibson has just made a deal with a mercenary group leader named Jakob Vries (Arnold Vosloo) to bring him Clarenbach at any cost, in exchange for the release of Vries' daughter. Vries and his team force Finley and Clarenbach to flee on foot. With both Widener and Vries after Clarenbach, Finley's only hope is to pit the two against each other, with Dunn's assistance. Despite their best efforts, Clarenbach ends up in the hands of Gibson. Vries gets his daughter back, and is immediately arrested by authorities. At the hideout, the kids in the sealed room hear bits and pieces of the abduction team's conversation through an old intercom they have found, but not enough for Beth Ann to discover her father's involvement. Nash devises an escape plan and tells Amber, but he is accosted by another guard, who stabs him. Amber knocks out the guard with a shovel, then turns to see that Nash has died.
9	"You Do Not Know War"	Joshua Butler	Sam Ernst & Jim Dunn	May 25, 2014	1AWN08	2.94
While in the bathroom, Ian discovers the secret passageway to the control room that (unknown to him) Gibson has been using. Gibson needs Clarenbach to produce the drug that was used on the soldiers as part of his plot to ruin Widener, but Clarenbach says he needs 12 hours. Knowing that special forces are descending on the hideout, Gibson needs to buy time. He phones Jin Liao's father, but immediately asks for the mother, Xao Liao, to negotiate Jin's release. Unknown to the father, Xao is a Chinese spy. Xao releases a computer virus that takes out the power grid and kills all standard communications in D.C. and the surrounding areas. This is considered an act of war, so the President mobilizes ships and jets around China, as Olsen orders Finley and Dunn to find Xao. When they finally find her, she is steadfast in her resolve to get her son back. They take her to a hospital, where she sees dozens of people suffering from her actions, and she is informed that 75 people are known to have died already. For the greater good, she disables the virus, knowing this action may kill her son. An irritated Gibson says that Xao has failed, and the parents of the remaining children must see what happens when they fail. Ian looks through the passageway as Gibson tells Jin, "They made me do this," before shooting him in the back.
10	"Found"	Mark Piznarski	Morenike Balogun & Michael Sonnenschein	June 1, 2014	1AWN09	3.88
Dunn and Finley respond to a call from a farmer, who has found the body of Jin Liao in a barn with a sign attached to his chest reading, "My mother failed." Ian tells a stunned Beth Ann that her father shot Jin, but he fully believes Gibson was ordered to do so. Troops have begun closing in on the hideout again, and soon identify the exact building. Clarenbach still needs more time, which Gibson hopes to buy during the negotiation process. He phones an unknown man in a bar, who had not seen his son in 14 years because of imprisonment. The man says he'll do anything to reconnect with his son, though it is revealed that his son is not one of the hostages. The FBI traces the receiving end of this call, and Finley and Dunn go to the location and find the patrons are all part of an Aryan anti-government group. They can only identify the man who received the call and left as "Buddy", and notice he left behind a partial block of C-4 explosive. At the hideout, the troops and FBI set up base in a nearby airplane hangar, while Gibson orders Dutton to return from her "vacation" to her FBI job. Clarenbach says the serum is ready, and Gibson injects all of it into Luke's body, planning to use Luke's blood and Buddy to transport the drug to Hawkins, Widener's remaining soldier. Dutton creates a false photo for "Buddy" and Finley and Dunn restrain the wrong guy. This allows Buddy, posing as an ambulance driver, to leave with Luke, his vials of blood, and the C-4. Gibson then tells the FBI the only way they can save the hostages is to send in Agent Finley.
11	"Best Laid Plans"	Eriq La Salle	Erik Oleson & Dawn DeNoon	June 15, 2014	1AWN10	3.21
Buddy's fraudulent photo is discovered. Dunn is sent to find the real Buddy and the blood he is carrying, as the contents of the blood are critical for doctors to save Luke. Finley approaches the mansion, and several hostages are released, but Kyle, Amber, Beth Ann and Ian are not among them. Finley sees that Koz, not Gibson, is on the phone making demands to President DeVore, who is steadfast in his resolve that he cannot negotiate with kidnappers, despite his wife's pleas. Kyle and Finley are placed in a holding cell, and Finley is routinely tortured by Koz. Buddy uses the C-4 to break into the compound where Hawkins, revealed to be his son, is being held. Buddy injects his son, and Gibson provides Hawkins with a verbal authentication code via phone, then gives the soldier his orders. Gibson then phones Meg, saying she will be bringing a weapon (Hawkins) into the Widener hearings, and that she will change her testimony in order to have Amber released. Dunn gets enough information at the hideout where Hawkins was held to save Luke's life, then is ordered to rush to the Widener hearings when Olsen is informed about Hawkins. Meg's testimony implicates Widener in the massacre and several other deaths, but Widener denies all charges. Hawkins moves behind Widener's wife and Widener recognizes him. Afraid for his own life as well as his wife's, Widener gives Hawkins new orders to stand down, then repeats the authentication code that Gibson had spoken earlier, thus confirming Meg's testimony. Back at the mansion, Amber has been released. Koz points a gun at Kyle, as the President has refused all demands, but Gibson steps in front and takes a bullet to the stomach.
12	"This Wasn't Supposed to Happen"	Constantine Makris	Far Shariat	June 21, 2014	1AWN11	2.74
Finley attends to Gibson's gunshot wounds, and asks if it was "only for the cameras". Koz sees that his contract has been broken by Gibson, and tells Clarenbach they are getting out of there with leverage. Koz notifies Dutton of the plans, and starts a fire in part of the mansion. As the smoke billows, Finley gets Gibson to admit he made the calls to the parents. Choppers arrive at the mansion, but it is still rigged to blow. Finley finds a Tahiti postcard on the bottom of a police-issue laptop, and now knows Gibson had an insider on the FBI force. He convinces "Tahiti" (Dutton) to give up the codes to disarm the mansion explosives. The remaining children are rescued, but Koz and Dutton have kidnapped Beth Ann. Meg arrives at the FBI base to see Amber, but the doctors there say Amber appears to be broken worse than the other children. Finley and Dunn track Beth Ann's kidnappers, but find Dutton dead, Koz severely wounded, and Beth Ann gone. Koz says he "sold" Beth Ann, and warns the agents about the horrible things Gibson will do to get her back. He raises his gun, and is shot and killed by the agents. Gibson recovers from his gunshot wounds and heads home with his wife, after the FBI realizes they have no hard evidence to hold him. While at home, he receives a call from the new kidnappers. The Ballard school is holding a vigil for Beth Ann, with President DeVore, the first lady, Kyle and Gibson all there. The Secret Service does not want the President near Gibson, but DeVore says he'll look like a coward if he doesn't shake the hand of the man who saved his son's life. Meanwhile, Beth Ann is shown gagged and sitting in a child's bedroom with a horrified look on her face.
13	"World's Best Dad"	Mark Piznarski	Rand Ravich	June 21, 2014	1AWN12	3.04
Gibson is shown in the basement of his home, tearing up the floor, then retrieving and setting up some sort of device. In the present, Olsen orders Finley and Dunn to get to the school and keep the POTUS away from Gibson. Kyle is shown with a box, which turns out to be candles. As Finley and Dunn arrive, Gibson has lit candles with Kyle and the first lady, but just as he is about to light the President's candle, the Secret Service whisks the POTUS off stage. In their limo, the POTUS and FLOTUS discuss who may have taken Beth Ann and if Widener may be involved, even though he is fishing in Montana awaiting trial. Just then, the first lady's nose begins to bleed, and she is rushed to the hospital. It is later confirmed she has suffered a stroke. Finley and Dunn question the now-contained Gibson, who reveals nothing. A flashback shows Gibson applying a sealant to his index finger, then applying another substance. Video of the vigil at the school shows him pressing that finger onto the first lady's hand while the two are shaking. The device in Gibson's basement is shown auto-dialing, and Amber is shown in her bed receiving a text message. It is later revealed that Ian is receiving the same messages, and the two purchase a box of diamonds (which Gibson had pre-arranged) and deliver them to a dealer. The FBI tracks the location of Amber and Ian, sending Dunn and Finley there just in time. It is revealed the dealer had also received a text saying the diamonds are a payment to kill Ian and hold Amber. Gibson uses another device concealed in a removed tooth to overcome his FBI handlers and escape. He phones Meg, knowing that it is Meg who took Beth Ann, and he tails her to a remote cabin. Dunn remembers a conversation earlier that day where Meg reminisced about the place they used to run away to as children, and she convinces Finley that the cabin is where they'll find Beth Ann. Gibson shoots Meg outside the cabin, badly wounding her, and rushes inside. He finds Beth Ann, who now has proof that her father was the mastermind at the mansion, which Meg had put in the bedroom. Gibson pleads that the kidnappers made him do everything and the page Beth Ann is holding proves nothing, but Beth Ann replies, "the gun you're pointing at me does." As the agents arrive, Gibson uses Beth Ann as a shield, but begins crying when Finley tells Beth Ann the horrible things that her father did, such as shooting Jin Liao in the back. Finley shoots Gibson in the shoulder, the agents recite the charges against him and take him out. Outside, Dunn tells her sister that she'll be charged with kidnapping Beth Ann and having Koz and Dutton shot, but Meg doesn't care because, "we got Gibson." Gibson's basement computer is then shown snapping back to life and sending a final text.

== Home media ==
The series was released on DVD in December 2014 by 20th Century Fox Home Entertainment, exclusively through Amazon as a "manufactured on demand" DVD-R set. The DVD contained all 13 episodes.

== Reception ==
=== Critical reception ===
Crisis scored 63 out of 100 on Metacritic based on 28 "generally favorable" reviews. On Rotten Tomatoes, it was given a score of 61% based on 33 reviews, with an average rating of 6.8 out of 10.

Alessandra Stanley of The New York Times gave it a positive review. Stanley wrote: "The pilot is terrific" and suggested that the series could be a new "24" but that "a series centered on a busload of kidnapped students and their fate, dragged out week after week, could easily try viewers' patience." Tim Goodman of The Hollywood Reporter gave it a negative review, calling it "as flat as any recent thriller on network television--actually more so. There’s barely an ounce of believability in it. The casting seems woeful and the acting isn’t going to get you to the second hour."

=== Ratings ===
No.	Title	Air date	Ratings/Share (18–49)	Viewers (millions)	DVR 18–49	DVR Viewers (millions)	Total 18–49	Total Viewers (millions)
1	"Pilot"	March 16, 2014	1.6/4	6.53	—N/a	—N/a	—N/a	—N/a
2	"If You Are Watching This, I Am Dead"	March 23, 2014	1.3/3	5.14	—N/a	2.76	—N/a	7.90
3	"What Was Done to You"	March 30, 2014	1.1/3	4.34	0.6	2.22	1.7	6.56
4	"We Were Supposed to Help Each Other"	April 6, 2014	1.0/3	4.47	0.7	—N/a	1.7	—N/a
5	"Designated Allies"	April 13, 2014	1.1/3	4.07	0.7	2.21	1.8	6.28
6	"Here He Comes"	April 20, 2014	0.9/3	3.73	0.7	2.22	1.8	5.95
7	"Homecoming"	April 27, 2014	1.0/3	3.99	0.6	2.03	1.6	6.02
8	"How Far Would You Go?"	May 4, 2014	1.0/3	3.61	—N/a	—N/a	—N/a	—N/a
9	"You Do Not Know War"	May 25, 2014	0.7/3	2.94	0.8	2.24	1.5	5.18
10	"Found"	June 1, 2014	0.8/3	3.88	—N/a	—N/a	—N/a	—N/a
11	"Best Laid Plans"	June 15, 2014	0.7/2	3.21	—N/a	—N/a	—N/a	—N/a
12	"This Wasn't Supposed to Happen"	June 21, 2014	0.5/2	2.74	—N/a	—N/a	—N/a	—N/a
13	"World's Best Dad"	June 21, 2014	0.6/3	3.04	—N/a	—N/a	—N/a	—N/a
