= Andrew Lazar =

American film producer (born 1966)

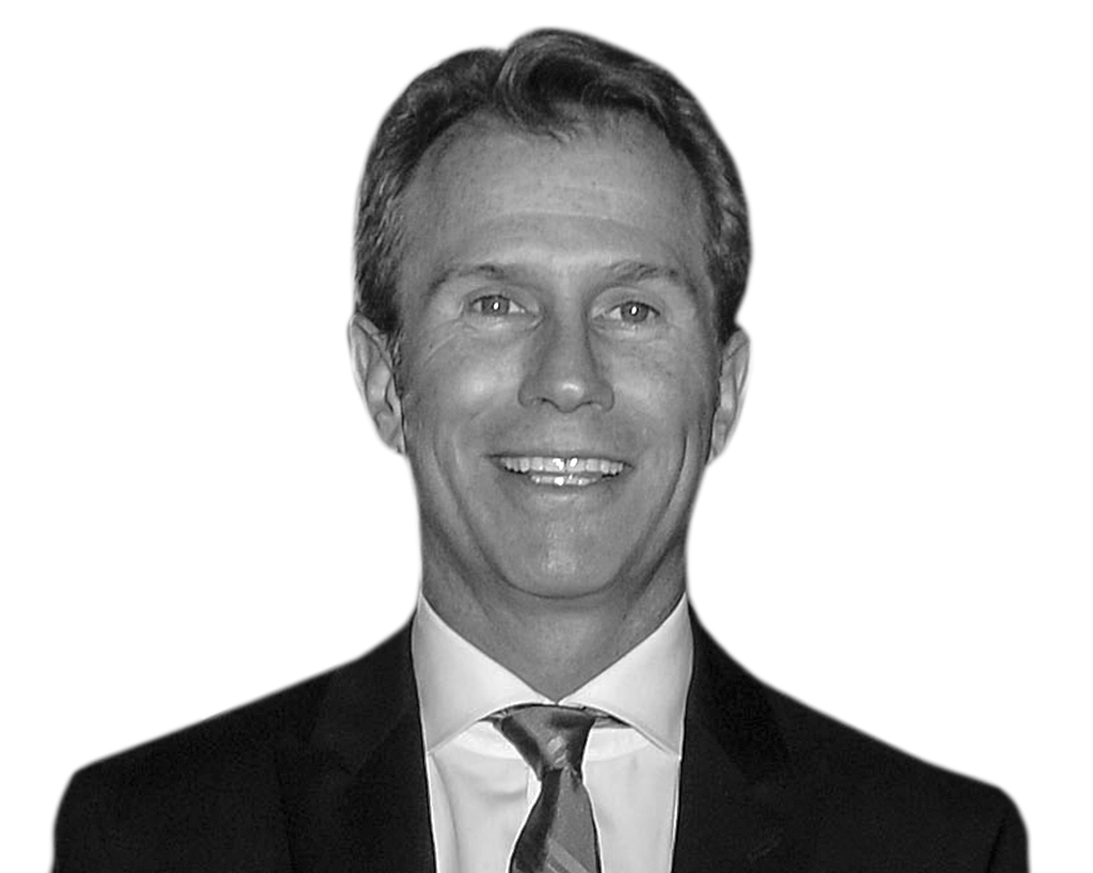
- Born: 1966 (age 59–60); New York City, U.S.
- Education: New York University Tisch School of the Arts

Andrew Lazar (born 1966) is an American film producer and graduate of the New York University Tisch School of the Arts. He is associated with Mad Chance Productions, a production company he formed in 1997 and affiliated with Warner Bros., but also has projects involved with other studios.

== Early life ==
Lazar worked for Oscar-winning producer Richard Zanuck.

== Filmography ==
=== Film ===
Producer

Year	Title	Notes
1995	Assassins	
1996	Unforgettable	Executive producer
1996	Bound	
1997	The Maker	
1999	10 Things I Hate About You	
1999	The Astronaut's Wife	
2000	Panic	
2000	Space Cowboys	
2000	Lucky Numbers	
2001	Cats & Dogs	
2002	Death to Smoochy	
2002	Confessions of a Dangerous Mind	
2004	Catch That Kid	
2008	Get Smart	
2008	Get Smart's Bruce and Lloyd: Out of Control	Direct-to-video
2009	I Love You Phillip Morris	
2010	Jonah Hex	
2010	Cats & Dogs: The Revenge of Kitty Galore	
2014	Behaving Badly	
2014	American Sniper	Nominated - Academy Award for Best Picture
2014	10 Things I Hate About Life	Unreleased
2015	Mortdecai	
2016	Rupture	
2018	Hidden Man	
2020	Think Like a Dog	
2020	Cats & Dogs 3: Paws Unite!	Direct-to-video
2020	Clouds	
2022	Last Looks	
2022	Persuasion	
2023	Nyad	
2024	The Killer's Game	
2024	Brothers	
2025	G20	
2026	Mike & Nick & Nick & Alice	
TBA	Dinner with Audrey	
TBA	Kockroach	
—N/a	Akira	

Thanks

- Rumpelstiltskin (1995)
- Pissed (2005)

=== Television ===
Executive producer

Year	Title	Notes
2006	The Time Tunnel	TV pilot
2022	George & Tammy	

Thanks

Year	Title	Notes
1998	Storm Chasers: Revenge of the Twister	TV movie
2016	After the Raves	Documentary
