= Life (American TV series) =

USA crime drama TV series (2007–2009)

- Life title sequence
- Genre: police procedural
- Created by: Rand Ravich
- Starring: Damian Lewis; Sarah Shahi; Brent Sexton; Donal Logue; Adam Arkin; Brooke Langton; Robin Weigert
- Composers: Jon Ehrlich; Jason Derlatka
- Country of origin: United States
- Original language: English
- No. of seasons: 2
- No. of episodes: 32 (list of episodes)

Production
- Executive producers: Rand Ravich; Far Shariat; David Semel; Daniel Sackheim
- Producer: Loucas George
- Running time: 45–48 minutes
- Production companies: Ravich-Shariat Productions; NBC Universal Television Studio (2007); Universal Media Studios (2007–2009)

Original release
- Network: NBC
- Release: September 26, 2007 – April 8, 2009

Life is an American police procedural television series created by Rand Ravich that aired for two seasons on NBC. It was produced by Universal Media Studios under the supervision of executive producers Rand Ravich, Far Shariat, David Semel, and Daniel Sackheim. Semel also directed the pilot.

The series stars Damian Lewis as Charlie Crews, a detective released from prison after serving twelve years for a crime he did not commit. Life premiered on September 26, 2007, on NBC and aired on Wednesday nights at 10:00 ET. On May 4, 2009, NBC announced its cancellation, a month after the final episode had been aired. The series was later made available for streaming through Hulu and Netflix.

== Plot ==
=== First season ===
Life centers on Detective Charlie Crews, who at the start of the first season (set in 2007) is released from Pelican Bay State Prison after serving twelve years of a life sentence. In 1995, he was wrongfully convicted of the triple murder of his friend and business partner, Tom Seybolt, and all but one of Seybolt's immediate family. Thanks to the efforts of his lawyer Constance Griffiths, DNA evidence exonerates him of the murders. Having lost his job, his wife, his friends, nearly all contact with the outside world and even his grip on reality for a time while in jail, he emerges enlightened by the philosophy of Zen, a fixation with fresh fruit (which he acquired while in prison, as it is nonexistent on the inside), and an obsession with solving the murders that nearly cost him his life and exposing the conspiracy that framed him for it. After successfully suing the city of Los Angeles and the LAPD, he is reinstated to the police department and receives an undisclosed amount of money, rumored at $50 million.

Crews is partnered with Detective Dani Reese, previously an undercover narcotics agent and now a recovering drug addict and alcoholic (thanks to her work and several betrayals as an undercover cop). Crews is not well received by Lieutenant Karen Davis, who, during the season, tries to force Reese into offering information that will see Crews suspended and eventually fired. Even though she herself is uncomfortable with her new partner, Reese backs Crews up on numerous occasions, and the two slowly develop a bond.

The overarching story of the first season concerns the murders for which Crews was wrongfully imprisoned, which leads him to confront various figures from his past such as his former patrol partner, his remarried ex-wife, and the detective who solved the triple-murder case and is still convinced of Crews' guilt. Near the end of the season, Crews manages to uncover information that implicates Reese's father (also a retired cop and Lt. Davis's former partner) in the murder. In the finale, Crews is able to bring the true killer, Kyle Hollis, to justice, but he remains unaware of the reasons behind his having been framed.

=== Second season ===
The second season premiered on Monday, September 29, 2008. On July 21, 2008, producers announced the second season would effectively re-launch the series with a new "pilot" episode. Earlier in March 2008, series creator and executive producer Rand Ravich explained that the second season would delve deeper into the conspiracy in the framing of Charlie Crews. Similarly, more of Dani Reese's past would be revealed.

Crews continues to investigate into the conspiracy to frame him and begins tracking some retired cops. He tracks down Rachel Seyboldt, the surviving member of his business partner's family and she moves in with him. Reese begins a relationship with the new captain after her father disappears. Crews eventually learns that he had been watched since the police academy, to eventually replace an aging crime lord. The intent was to corrupt Crews' friend Tom Seyboldt, who owned a bar with Crews and that by corrupting his business partner, they would also corrupt Crews. Mistakes were made, the Seyboldts were inadvertently murdered and Crews framed for the crime. The second season concludes with Crews trading himself for Reese after she is kidnapped by Roman Nevikov. Soon after, Crews kills Nevikov by crushing his windpipe. The last scene of the series shows Crews finally finding peace.

== Characters ==
Original first-season main cast of Life. From left to right: Robin Weigert, Sarah Shahi, Damian Lewis, Adam Arkin and Melissa Sagemiller.

=== Main ===
- Detective Charles "Charlie" Crews Jr. (Damian Lewis) is the main character of Life. Crews was an ordinary police officer whose simple life came to an abrupt end when his friends, the Seybolt family, were brutally murdered. The sole survivor was the daughter, Rachel Seybolt. Charlie and Tom Seybolt owned a bar together. Crews was put on trial and convicted for the murders. Stripped of his badge and innocence, Crews was given a life sentence, where he suffered horribly. Because he had been a police officer, the prisoners were eager to beat him regularly and brutally. His depression worsened as his friends and loved ones turned on him, believing him guilty, and the world at large moved on without him. After twelve years, Crews's lawyer proves his innocence, he is exonerated, given a substantial settlement ($50 million) which Ted Earley (his former prison friend and new roommate) manages and expands over the course of the series. Additionally, he is reinstated to the LAPD, and promoted to detective in the homicide division. While fulfilling his police responsibilities, Crews attempts to reconnect with his friends and loved ones, working to put his life back together and come to grips with his place in the world. He is most successful with his former partner, Officer Bobby Stark, enlisting his help on cases and even briefly re-partnering with him in an unofficial capacity. Crews also attempts to reconnect with his ex-wife Jennifer, who believed him guilty, divorcing him and remarrying while Crews was still in prison. Unknown to anyone except Ted, Crews is pursuing an unauthorized and illegal investigation to uncover the truth about his conviction and incarceration. Charlie displays an intense enjoyment of fruit (according to him, fresh fruit is never available in prison) and eats different kinds of fruit repeatedly in each episode. While incarcerated, Crews began reading The Way of Zen by Alan Watts, leading to his adoption of a zen Buddhist outlook. While he often appears dreamily preoccupied and makes esoteric zen remarks, Crews is still deeply troubled and exhibits conflict between following Buddhist precepts and seeking retribution for his imprisonment. Crews has a particularly difficult relationship with his father, Charles Sr., showing him open contempt (to the point he insists on being called "Charlie" to distinguish himself from him), as his father was among the first to believe Charlie guilty, and went so far as to forbid Charlie's mother from visiting her son in prison, which Charlie believes led to her death. Crews's father broke into his son's house to deliver a wedding invitation and was shot by Crews, who believed him to be a home invader. The wound was minor and his father recovered, but their relationship is still strained. Crews's investigations gradually gained more and more attention, most notably from The Group. In response, they sent FBI Special Agent Paul Bodner, one of their operatives, to kill Crews. Bodner shot Crews as he answered the door. Crews nearly died and had an out-of-body experience. Once he recovered, he re-cast the bullet Bodner shot him with, and shot Bodner in the leg with it to "get even."

Series Creator Rand Ravich immediately considered Damian Lewis for the part. Lewis chose to do the role after reading the script, in which he appreciated the character-driven nature of the story.

- Detective Dani Reese (Sarah Shahi) is Crews's skeptical but loyal partner and immediate superior. Over the course of the series, the two develop a strong working relationship, despite Reese's frustration at Crews's eccentricities and her discomfort at being caught between him and their first-season boss, Lt. Davis, who wants her help getting Crews off the force. Reese also has serious problems of her own, as a recovering drug addict and alcoholic who seeks out anonymous sex. The episode "Tear Asunder" suggests that she sees self-destructive behavior as a way of punishing herself. Reese's drug addiction dates to an undercover assignment on a narcotics case, and there is no indication that she continues to use. By contrast, it is immediately clear that she is still drinking. Her alcoholism is central to the first-season episode "Powerless," which ends with her apparently sincere embrace of Alcoholics Anonymous. In the second-season episode "Trapdoor," however, Reese falls off the wagon, when her then-boyfriend, Captain Tidwell, pushes her about meeting his father. Although this lapse suggests that Reese has not truly dealt with the underlying causes of her addictions, there is no indication that she is drinking for the remainder of the series. Reese's troubles also include a strained, resentful relationship with her father, Jack Reese. She confides to Crews in the episode "Serious Control Issues" that she spent her childhood trying to figure out if her father was "only mean, or just plain bad." There are other clues suggesting an unpleasant upbringing. Although Reese is bilingual, having learned Persian from her mother, she tells Crews in the episode "A Civil War" that her father forbade them to use the language in his presence. Reese is seemingly unaware of her father's involvement in the conspiracy to imprison Crews. In the final episode of season one, Crews is about to tell her but is interrupted. Reese's being "in the know" is teased through season two, but there is never a full disclosure. Reese does eventually confront Crews about her father's involvement during "Trapdoor," but Crews is shot in the chest before they can complete the conversation.

In the second season finale, Sarah Shahi is visibly pregnant, which was announced in early 2009. She started to work fewer hours on set. The storyline used was that Reese was on temporary assignment working for the FBI. Gabrielle Union filled in for Reese as Crews's temporary partner, Detective Jane Seever.

Reese's inner demons are what attracted Shahi to play the character. Specifically she said, "I like the fact that she has a dark side and she has some demons that she needs to overcome."

- Ted Earley (Adam Arkin) is Crews's housemate and financial advisor. Ted met Crews in prison, having originally been a wealthy CEO of a powerful company, who lost his job and was imprisoned for insider trading, something he now regrets. Crews saved Ted's life in prison, and Ted was there to support Crews upon his release. Ted discovered Crews's unauthorized and illegal investigation behind the conspiracy that led to his frame-up, and prevented a DA investigation from discovering it.

In Season 2, Ted started teaching at a business school. Initially, the class has virtually no one attending, but Olivia, Ted's love interest (and Charlie's father's fiancée), spreads rumors of Ted doing impressive crimes that cause the class to be filled to capacity. The Group, specifically FBI Special Agent Paul Bodner, framed Earley for violating his parole and Earley was briefly returned to Pelican Bay. Crews acted quickly, arranging for his prison friends to protect and serve him and eventually "convinced" Bodner to have Earley released.

- Officer Robert "Bobby" Stark (Brent Sexton) is a uniform police officer and former partner of Charlie Crews. When Crews was put on trial for the murder of the Seybolt family, Bobby was unable to support his partner as he was threatened with imprisonment if he testified for his defense. Twelve years later, after Crews's release, Bobby made successful attempts to reconnect with him, and regularly aids him on cases. He managed to get a hold of Crews's old badge and service revolver and returns them to Charlie soon after he rejoins the LAPD. Bobby regularly clashes with Crews's new partner, Dani Reese, for a variety of reasons (e.g. being a female cop, being the daughter of Jack Reese and resultant perception of nepotism, being his superior officer, etc.) Bobby has a wife, Leslie, three kids, and a sister, Kathy, who is a "badge bunny" (i.e. police groupie) and has made romantic advances on Crews.
- Captain Kevin Tidwell (Donal Logue) is the head of the LAPD homicide division and Crews and Reese's new commanding officer following Karen Davis's demotion. Originally from New York, Tidwell is portrayed as having a very easy-going attitude, but takes his work very seriously when needed, excelling in situations of extreme chaos. Over the course of Season 2, Tidwell made romantic advances on Reese. Initially she rebuffed him, but eventually the two began an intimate relationship. Tidwell has three ex-wives, who all still love him, and is extremely paranoid and afraid of earthquakes (due to the fact he doesn't actually understand them). He has the habit of speaking of himself in third person at times, and once mentioned in "Crushed" to have played the trombone in a marching band for 13 years, but it is not known if he still plays. Logue was added to the cast in Season 2, as an effort to lighten Damian Lewis's workload.
- ADA Constance Griffiths (Brooke Langton) was Charlie Crews's attorney who was instrumental in finding and proving his innocence, leading to his release. As a result, Constance was asked to become an Assistant District Attorney, which she accepted. Constance and Crews are seen to greatly care for one another; both in turn make references to a potential relationship, if Constance had not been married. Constance was a main character in Season 1. Originally, Melissa Sagemiller was cast to play the role, but she was replaced by Langton in July 2007.
- Lt./Sgt. Karen Davis (Robin Weigert) is the head of LAPD homicide, and commanding officer of Crews and Reese during season 1. In cases she participates in, Davis is uptight, by-the-book and cares about enforcing the law; yet during the entirety of the first season she uses her power to attempt to get Crews kicked off the force by getting Reese to reveal any misbehaviour by Crews, true or not. Between Season 1 and Season 2, Davis, for reasons apparently affiliated with the mishandling of the Ames case, is demoted and returned to field work. While Davis is a main character in Season 1, she makes an appearance in only one season two episode ("Not for Nothing").

=== Recurring ===
- Arthur Tins (Jon Sklaroff) was a low-rate con artist who, in an attempt to con money out of Mark Rawls' son (claiming, falsely, to be a lawyer who knew something that could get his father out of prison) killed him with a shot to the back when he wouldn't pay. Charlie Crews eventually tracked down and captured Tins. Tins initially boasted that, due to lack of evidence, he could only be held for a year (for violating parole), but as he was escorted by Crews and Dani Reese to prison, he noticed Rawls waiting for him, and immediately confessed so he could be sent to another prison. Given a life sentence, Tins escaped a year later while out on work detail with two others during an earthquake, a more cunning and dangerous criminal due to things learned in prison. Tins manipulated Crews into leading him to the paroled Rawls, whom he killed with a shot to the back of the head, and then successfully robbed an armored truck. Crews eventually tracked him down to the home of the manager of the armored truck company, where Tins was holding her, her husband, and her son and daughter hostage. A stand-off ensued until Crews was able to shoot Tins in the chest, killing him. As Tins died, he remarked to Crews "I'll see you later then Crews." Tins's ghost, complete with the bullet wound that killed him, appeared to Crews during his "rebirth," and he remarked how bullet wounds still hurt in the afterlife, and "that's just messed up."
- Captain Jack Reese (retired) (Victor Rivers) is the father of Dani Reese and a member of the group of 6 ex-police officers known as The Group. Reese is a retired SWAT captain, highly respected and admired, though unknown to most, he was involved in the Bank of Los Angeles Shootout. During the shootout, he led the SWAT team, but behind the scenes, he and his men stole the missing $18 million. Reese was a key orchestrator in the conspiracy of sending Crews to prison, and played a cat-and-mouse game with him until he suddenly departed. Roman Nevikov, one of the Group's "investments" who was abandoned by them in favor of Crews, claimed in the second-season finale to have subsequently captured and killed Reese.
- Detective Carl Ames (retired) (Roger Aaron Brown) was the lead detective on the case that sent Charlie Crews to jail, and decided to retire right after Crews was given a life sentence. He was a friend of Jack Reese, and as such falsified certain details in the case to ensure Crews was convicted (most of all, obscuring the fact Rachel Seybolt was still in the house at the time). After Crews was released, Ames, despite all the evidence to the contrary, refused to believe it (due in part to the gruesome killing of the Seybolt family which apparently still haunted him). Crews, as a result, was driven to repeatedly seek Ames and confront him with the evidence, attempting to force out any details leading to the conspiracy that led to his imprisonment. Ames was found murdered with a shot to his head and heart in his car in the Los Angeles police station parking lot, as a result of his failed plan to further frame Crews. Crews was initially the primary suspect, but was eventually proven innocent. In the Season 1 finale, Crews recognizes the two henchmen seeking Kyle Hollis as the same standing beside Reese on the morning of Ames' death. Realizing Reese ordered Ames killed by the two men, Crews takes out his old service pistol and successfully shoots and kills the two men, avenging Ames.
- Jennifer Conover (Jennifer Siebel) is Charlie Crews' ex-wife who, not believing his innocence, divorced him when he was in prison, and in the 12 years he has been in prison, she has remarried and had a son and daughter. After Crews is released, he regularly approaches her, having never given up his feelings. Initially her viewpoint towards him is strained, but in the middle of Season 2, Jennifer finally succumbed to his advances and they had a night of passion, which was the closure to their relationship.
- Kyle Hollis, a.k.a. Reverend Orson Parker (Titus Welliver) is the true murderer of the Seybolt family, the crime that Crews went to prison for. Hollis, at the time, served as Jack Reese's confidential informant and street muscle, and was sent to Tom Seybolt, who was one of the money launderers of the missing $18 million from the Bank of LA Shootout, when it was found that he was stealing a portion of the money he was given. (It is revealed in the last episode that Tom Seybolt was not guilty of money laundering but was being set up by The Group in an attempt to make him dirty in hopes of making Crews dirty.) High on drugs, Hollis went out of control and murdered Tom Seybolt along with his wife and son, leaving only his daughter Rachel alive. Afterward, Hollis turned his life around and became a man of God, adopting Rachel as well. When Crews finally tracked him down, he initially wishes to kill him, but instead tricks him into confessing to the crime. Hollis was subsequently sent to prison. In Season 2, Crews visited him in prison to find out more about his connection to Reese, only for Hollis to strangely deny he ever knew him.
- Mark Rawls (Michael Cudlitz) is a criminal serving a 10-year prison sentence whose son was found murdered, but Charlie Crews solved the crime (with Rawls' unknowing assistance). As a thank-you, Rawls, at Crews' request, uses his contacts in the criminal underworld to finally locate Kyle Hollis, as well as his new name, profession, and the fact that others were after him. In Season 2, Rawls is paroled, and during the earthquake that strikes Los Angeles, Rawls planned to hunt down Arthur Tins, his son's killer, who he learned from his prison friends had escaped in the earthquake. Crews was legally forced to interfere with his plan, and in doing so, Tins was able to kill Rawls. Crews, in turn, killed Tins.
- Mickey Rayborn (William Atherton) was a police officer who retired and became a highly-influential philanthropist. He was also a member of the group of 6 ex-police officers known as The Group. Rayborn, having learned he is going to die from an unspecified form of cancer, willingly aided Charlie Crews in his investigation of Jack Reese, another member of The Group. :Eventually, Rayborn gave up key details of The Group to Crews, giving him some important answers to their activities. After the meeting, Rayborn's private yacht, where he had met Crews last, was found adrift a mile out to sea by the Coast Guard; its deck covered in blood, with Rayborn presumed to have been butchered by Nevikov. In the Season 2 finale, it was revealed not only was Rayborn still alive and hiding from Nevikov, but he was never sick in the first place (his "cancer appointments" were really him gradually stockpiling the blood necessary to properly fake his death); Rayborn worked together with Crews to save Dani from Nevikov.
- Olivia Canton (Christina Hendricks) is the significantly younger fiancé of Charles Crews Sr., the estranged father of Charlie Crews. Olivia has made repeated, and always rebuffed, attempts to make contact with Crews, resulting in her spending a lot of time with Ted, who developed feelings for her. She gently turns down his romantic efforts while trying to maintain a friendship with him. Her relationship with Charles Sr. ultimately broke down when she couldn't take the strain of their poor relationship any longer. She runs off to Spain by the end of the second season. Ted finds out and immediately follows her.
- Rachel Seyboldt, a.k.a. Rachel Hollis (Jessy Schram) is the sole surviving member of the family murdered by Kyle Hollis and that Charlie Crews was framed for. Being only nine years old at the time, Rachel was left deeply emotionally scarred and even now finds it difficult to socialize. Due to Jack Reese's efforts to protect her from the rest of his group, Crews had to spend a great deal of time and effort in Season 1 to find her, and eventually found she had been adopted by Hollis. After Hollis' arrest and imprisonment, in Season 2, Rachel moves in with Crews. Initially, Rachel's relationship with Crews was tense, but, as both were "wrecked" by the crime and went through a dark time in their respective lives, it eventually grew to bond them together, and they began caring about one another. Roman Nevikov, a ruthless Russian mobster Crews was investigating, subtly threatened more than once to rape and kill Rachel if he investigated the triple murder too deeply, forcing Crews to send her away for her own safety.
- Roman Nevikov (Garret Dillahunt) is a ruthless Russian mobster and human trafficker based in Los Angeles. Supposedly, Nevikov was born in prison, and exhibits extreme sociopathic tendencies. Cool, calm, and extremely confident, Nevikov always seems to know specific and private details about those he interacts with (particularly Crews and Reese). Those who work for him fear him as being untouchable. This is proven when Nevikov, having murdered one of his prostitutes and been subsequently arrested by Charlie Crews and Dani Reese, is released without charge when it is revealed that he is a protected federal informant.

While in custody, Nevikov provided information to Crews that led him to shift the focus of his personal investigation towards the Bank of Los Angeles Shootout. In Season 2, however, it is revealed the agent who delivered this news (FBI Special Agent Bodner) was really corrupt and working for Nevikov. Nevikov brought a team of builders consisting of two builders/mob enforcers and an engineering genius, over from Moscow to the United States illegally, and then had them monitor the site of the future new federal building in Los Angeles, copy details of the building's security system, and then installed it in Nevikov's club (under the guise of unknown renovation work), as well as underground vaults underneath the basement. Once the work was completed, Nevikov couldn't risk his secrets being exposed as the builders knew too much and he had the men executed. Crews and Reese investigated, and eventually approached Nevikov about the killings. Nevikov denied any knowledge, but because they "asked nicely" (appealed to his ego), he agreed to ask around.
Nevikov noticed the detectives continuing investigations on him, and subtly threatened Rachel Seybolt's life if Crews investigated too deeply. The LAPD launched a search of Nevikov's club, hiding it from federal attention, but found nothing, and Bodner claimed jurisdiction over the case when it was suspected the engineer was involved in terrorism. By reading Russian history Crews figured out what Nevikov had done and suspects that the engineer, Pavel, had left a "trapdoor" in Nevikov's security system for the police to find.
As such, Crews, Reese and a SWAT team stormed Nevikov's club, with Nevikov calmly waiting for them and gave himself up. Initially he remained calm and confident they wouldn't find anything yet again, but Crews used the personal laptop built by Pavel for Nevikov to unlock the "trapdoor" in the security system (a video made and narrated by Pavel shortly before his death) explaining what transpired as well as revealing what he found was going on in the underground vaults beneath the club's basement (human trafficking). The people were released and Nevikov was believed to have been brought to justice.
It was later revealed that Nevikov was an "investment" for the Group who was abandoned in favor of Crews to take charge of their money laundering operation. Spurned by this betrayal, Nevikov hunted down and killed Jack Reese, and attempted to do the same with Mickey Rayborn, failing when Rayborn went into hiding. Needing a way to find him, Nevikov arranged with his friends in the FBI to have Dani captured, and then tried to tie up loose ends by having the same agents killed. Crews realized Nevikov was still at large when, going to maximum security prison to see him, he instead found another prisoner paid to impersonate Nevikov and serve his sentence in his place. Nevikov then contacted Crews with a straight deal: Reese for Rayborn.
Crews, instead, offered up himself as he had intimate knowledge of Rayborn's financial details, which Nevikov could use to take over the laundering operation. While in transport, Crews used a technique he learned in prison to crush Nevikov's windpipe, thereby killing him. Nevikov's bodyguards, really working for him out of fear for their families, let Crews go when he explains to them that whatever Nevikov had on them died with him.

- Special Agent Paul Bodner (Shashawnee Hall) is an FBI agent who is occasionally on loan to the Department of Homeland Security. Bodner originally encountered and came into conflict with Charlie Crews when he came into the LAPD to protect Roman Nevikov, explaining that Nevikov was a protected federal informant. In Season 2, Bodner, back with the FBI full-time, confronted Crews with his investigation into Jack Reese, and warned him not to investigate too deeply. Crews later found out Bodner was corrupt; he only came to Nevikov's defense because he was working for him. Bodner was responsible for sending Ted Earley back to prison, and he came to claim jurisdiction over the (fruitless) search of Roman Nevikov's club. Initially there was conflict between him and Cpt. Kevin Tidwell, but when it was found the murdered engineer was monitoring the site of the future new federal building in Los Angeles, the Joint Terrorism Task Force was called by Tidwell, who in turn sent Bodner. Believing it a possible terrorist operation, Bodner claimed jurisdiction and warned Crews, Reese and Tidwell to stay away from Nevikov, indicating to Crews that he would risk being killed. Bodner fulfilled his threat by going to Crews' house and shooting him in the shoulder and making a successful escape. Crews, however, remembered it was him and, instead of turning him in, shot him in the leg with the same bullet Bodner shot Crews with. Hostilities between them subsided when Bodner confessed he only worked for Nevikov not because he was corrupt, but because Nevikov threatened his family (demonstrated when he returned home from work to find Nevikov having tea with Bodner's wife and daughter present). Bodner, from this point, worked together with Crews. In the Season 2 finale, Crews saved Bodner from being assassinated by one of Nevikov's agents, and Bodner worked with Crews to rescue Reese.
- Detective Jane Seever (Gabrielle Union) is Charlie Crews' temporary partner during Detective Reese's loan to the FBI and subsequent disappearance. She has a "15-year plan" to eventually become the mayor of Los Angeles. She can speed read, takes detailed notes of every idea that Crews' voices and has an eidetic memory. She is a lawyer, and once ran in the Olympics (relay only).
- Amanda Puryer (Helen McCrory, Damien Lewis' wife) is a security specialist in Rayborn's employ. She starts a rough relationship with Crews, thinking he murdered Rayborn, and bringing it to his attention. She seems to openly disrespect Charlie, to the point of breaking the law in front of him, and giving remarks that are meant, and sometimes are, insensitive or dry. Her British accent annoys Crews, and according to Ted, "makes everything sound smart". She has technology that Crews and Earley don't and uses it to help them find people, specifically Rayborn. She tends to stay with Earley during scenes, each having short relevant conversations.

=== Guest Starring ===
- Chad Lindberg, Larry Poindexter, Brynn Thayer, Braeden Lemasters, Reno Wilson, Matt Gerald: season 1 episode 1;
- Max Greenfield, Meredith Salenger, Ryan Locke, Natalie Dreyfuss, Shawn Reaves: season 1 episode 2
- Charles Malik Whitfield, Robert LaSardo, Mike Batayeh, Tyler Tuione, The Greg Wilson: season 1 episode 3;
- William Sanderson, Rod Rowland, John Livingston, Jackie Debatin, Anil Kumar, season 1 episode 4;
- Jessica Paré, Rod Rowland, Steven Porter, Christian Meoli, Robin Pearson Rose: season 1 episode 5;
- Jeffrey Pierce, Deborah Ann Woll, Ben Benitz, Dale Dickey, Doug McKeon, Ken Faulcon, Ron Brownstein: season 1 episode 6;
- Sarah Clarke, Trent Ford, Matt Gerald, Sheila Vand, Rosie Malek-Yonan, Scott Michael Morgan, Michael Kostroff: season 1 episode 7;
- Lori Rom, Diana Parks, Michael Harney, Phyllis Lyons, Judith Moreland: season 1 episode 8;
- Michael Harney, Joseph Lyle Taylor, Phyllis Lyons, Michael Gladis, Soren Fulton: season 1 episode 9;
- Jude Ciccolella, Fay Masterson, Chandler Parker, Hillary Tuck, Brian Klugman, Todd Giebenhain: season 1 episode 10;
- Noel Fisher, Kim Director, Matthew Currie Holmes, Erica Tazel: season 2 episode 1;
- Stacy Haiduk, Matt Lanter, McKenna Jones, Max Gail, Adam Hendershott, Eileen Boylan: season 2 episode 2;
- Marguerite Moreau, Marsha Thomason, Todd Stashwick, Hector Luis Bustamante, Michael Shamus Wiles, Jeremy Gaskin, Martin Grey: season 2 episode 3;
- Henri Lubatti, Jake Abel, Jesse James, Scott Michael Campbell, Erik Eidem, Jarod S. Einsohn: season 2 episode 4;
- Jonathan Banks, Maeve Quinlan, Katie Lang Johnson, Alex Sol, Gloria Garayua: season 2 episode 5;
- Michael Cudlitz, Stacey Travis, Rebecca Lowman: season 2 episode 6;
- Stephen Bogardus, Eugene Byrd, Jonathan Slavin: season 2 episode 7;
- Kyle Gallner, Marcus Giamatti, Brianne Davis, Steven Crowley, Mary Mouser: season 2 episode 8;
- Alex Carter, Victoria Pratt, Jamie Harris, Aja Evans, Mitchell Fink, Tyler Kain: season 2 episode 9;
- Timilee Romolini, Zahn McClarnon, Clayne Crawford, Sal Lopez, Malaya Rivera Drew: season 2 episode 10;
- Rachel Miner, Michael Raymond-James, Tim deZarn, Marshall Allman, Mary Gross, Jessica Dunphy: season 2 episode 11;
- Tessa Thompson, Geoff Pierson: season 2 episode 12;
- J. Patrick McCormack, Richard Speight Jr., Josh Randall, Kayren Butler: season 2 episode 13;
- Patrick Fabian, Angela Goethals, Rick D. Wasserman, Kate Connor, Jelly Howie, Jim Cody Williams, Geoff Pierson: season 2 episode 14;
- M. C. Gainey, Charlotte Rae, Dave Florek, Wayne Péré, Tamara Feldman, Ian Reed Kesler, Amanda Fuller: season 2 episode 15;
- Allison McAtee, Erick Avari, Sarayu Rao: season 2 episode 16;
- Tim Guinee, Valarie Rae Miller, Adam Wylie: season 2 episode 17;
- Jason Beghe, Michele Hicks, Maurice Compte, Larry Clarke, Michael Rose, Julie Remala: season 2 episode 18;
- Ian Gomez, Linda Park, Googy Gress, Colleen Porch, Amanda Fuller, Gena Shaw: season 2 episode 19;
- Kevin Kilner, Marisol Nichols, Darby Stanchfield, Lauren Cohan: season 2 episode 20;
- Victor McCay: season 2 episode 21.

== Production ==
=== Development ===
In an interview with seat42f.com, series creator Rand Ravich explained that Life came initially from Ravich's own long-standing interest in, and desire to work on, a police procedural show. Ravich first created the character of Charlie Crews as the basis for the show; upon the completion of the script for the show's pilot, Ravich immediately considered actor Damian Lewis for the role.

Life was conceived as an episodic television show in the vein of 24, where emotional closure is provided as new clues to the main mystery (the conspiracy that sent Charlie Crews to prison) are revealed every few episodes, with Ravich stating that he and the writers disliked the serial nature of some shows where it feels "like you’re kind of wandering in the desert".

=== Crew ===
The series was created by Rand Ravich, who also served as executive producer alongside Far Shariat, David Semel, and Daniel Sackheim for Universal Media Studios. Semel also directed the pilot. Rafael Alvarez (The Wire) was a writer and producer for the show. Alvarez also wrote a pilot called Panic in Detroit for NBC. Based on this piece they hired him to work on Life as a writer and producer.

NBC issued an order for a minimum of three additional episodes, on top of the original order for seven, the day "Let Her Go" aired, October 10, 2007. On November 26 NBC announced that Life had received a full season. However, due to the 2007–2008 Writers Guild of America strike only 11 of the 22 episodes were completed.

After the strike ended on February 13, 2008, NBC decided not to film any more episodes for the 2007–08 season and instead announced that Life had been picked up for a second season and would return for the Fall 2008/09 season on Friday nights at 10/9c. The network released the first episode of season two, a week before its air date, online and via cable on demand.

On November 7, 2008, NBC picked up Life for a full season.

After the first season and the writers' strike was over, half of the writing staff of the show (originally six writers), who were all also producers, decided to quit and did not return for season 2. According to creator/showrunner Rand Ravich, it wasn't either due to the strike or over creative disagreement: "I just think people went on to do what they want to."

One of the writers, Glen Mazzara, moved on to a new series, Crash, starring Dennis Hopper, where he served as writer, executive producer and showrunner. Mazzara was also a writer and showrunner on 'The Walking Dead'.

== Episodes and broadcast ==
Season	Episodes	Originally released	
Season	Episodes	First released	Last released
1	11	September 26, 2007	December 5, 2007
2	21	September 29, 2008	April 8, 2009

Life premiered on September 26, 2007, on NBC, aired on Wednesday. NBC initially ordered thirteen episodes of the show: an original order of seven episodes, and then on October 10, 2007, placed an order for at least three additional episodes, later pinned down as six episodes. In November 2007 NBC placed an order for the balance of a full season, nine additional episodes. This would have brought the show's first season to a standard 22 episodes, with NBC stating it was hitting its creative stride. However, due to the 2007–2008 Writers Guild of America strike, only 11 of the 22 episodes were completed.

The second season premiered on Monday, September 29, 2008, and a second episode aired Friday, October 3, 2008. Another episode aired Monday, October 6, 2008, after which it was moved to its regular time slot of Friday nights at 10/9c and then after four weeks the show was moved to Wednesday nights at 9/8c.

=== International distribution ===
Country	Channel	Premiere date
Australia	Network Ten	
Italy	Joi	2/20/2008
Lithuania	TV3 Lithuania	
Russia	Fox Crime	
Germany	VOX	3/11/2009
Switzerland	SRF zwei	1/12/2009

== DVD releases ==
Title	Release	Episodes	Additional information
The Complete First Season	September 2, 2008	11	While the music selection plays an important role on the show, a process supervised by creator Rand Ravich, the DVDs do not include the original music selection but alternative songs (NBC's "rewind version").
The Complete Second Season	August 25, 2009	21	While the original version of the episode "Canyon Flowers" opened with Coldplay's song "42", the song is missing on the DVD. The original version of "Find Your Happy Place" opened with Gram Rabbit's "Devil's Playground", also missing from the DVD.

== Reception ==
=== Critical response ===
As of August 2008, Life has a 64% favorable rating for season 1 and a 72% rating for season 2 on Metacritic. Ken Tucker of Entertainment Weekly dubs the series "a very good new show that needs a more vivid title and more of NBC's promotional oomph" and praising the portrayal of Charlie Crews by the "beloved" Damian Lewis. In contrast, Gina Bellafante of The New York Times noted that the character of Detective Crews (and contemporary Adrian Monk of the series Monk) did not portray "law enforcers as believable soldiers of the working class", which she considered a negative. Tonally though, she described the show as "a musical version of a Thomas Harris novel" (Harris is a noted and acclaimed author of crime novels) and found the narrative to be "incredibly satisfying".

David Bianculli of the Daily News (New York) also likened the character of Crews to Adrian Monk, noting that "Lewis is commanding, and draws your attention without saying a word, almost as much as does Tony Shalhoub on Monk". He also praised Sarah Shahi for her performance as Dani Reese, stating that "it's easy to imagine her as the star of her own spinoff, taking her no-nonsense character front and center". Alan Sepinwall, reporter for The Star-Ledger instead cited a resemblance between Crews and main character Gregory House (played by British actor Hugh Laurie) of House, but noting that "where House's quirks and bad behavior are ceaselessly amusing, Crews' idiosyncrasies—also including a bafflement at modern technology like camera phones and instant messaging—are already tired by the end of the first episode".

Robert Bianco similarly made the comparison between Life and House and Monk but noted that the character of Crews is covered "with so many quirks, foibles, and eccentricities you can hardly spot poor Lewis underneath", concluding with "strip away the abrasive flourishes and what's left is a standard issue TV mystery with cases that are too easy to solve and internal conflicts and conspiracies that make no sense".

=== Ratings ===
==== U.S. television ratings ====
#	Title	Air date	Rating	Share	18–49	Viewers
S01E01	"Pilot: Merit Badge"	September 26, 2007	6.5	11	4.1	10.15
S01E02	"Tear Asunder"	October 3, 2007	5.7	10	3.0	8.80
S01E03	"Let Her Go"	October 10, 2007	5.3	9	2.8	8.14
S01E04	"What They Saw"	October 17, 2007	5.0	8	2.8	7.66
S01E05	"The Fallen Woman"	October 24, 2007	4.7	9	2.5	6.85
S01E06	"Powerless"	October 31, 2007	3.7	6	2.0	5.72
S01E07	"A Civil War"	November 7, 2007	4.1	7	2.6	6.41
S01E08	"Farthingale"	November 14, 2007	4.5	8	2.5	6.94
S01E09	"Serious Control Issues"	November 28, 2007	4.1	7	2.2	6.27
S01E10	"Dig a Hole"	December 3, 2007	4.3	7	2.5	6.61
S01E11	"Fill It Up"	December 5, 2007	5.0	8	2.5	7.64
S02E01	"Find Your Happy Place"	September 29, 2008	...	...	2.8	6.92
S02E02	"Everything. . . All the Time"	October 3, 2008	...	...	2.3	5.78
S02E03	"The Business of Miracles"	October 6, 2008	...	...	1.7	5.44
S02E04	"Not for Nothing"	October 10, 2008	...	...	1.4	4.92
S02E05	"Crushed"	October 17, 2008	...	...	1.5	5.93
S02E06	"Did You Feel That?"	October 24, 2008	...	...	1.5	5.49
S02E07	"Jackpot"	November 5, 2008	...	...	2.0	5.82
S02E08	"Black Friday"	November 12, 2008	...	...	1.8	5.83
S02E09	"Badge Bunny"	November 19, 2008	...	...	1.7	5.32
S02E10	"Evil...And His Brother Ziggy"	December 3, 2008	...	...	2.3	8.10
S02E11	"Canyon Flowers"	December 10, 2008	...	...	1.8	5.46
S02E12	"Trapdoor"	December 17, 2008	...	...	1.7	5.19
S02E13	"Re-entry"	February 4, 2009	...	...	1.8	6.76
S02E14	"Mirror Ball"	February 11, 2009	3.2	5	1.4	4.72
S02E15	"I Heart Mom"	February 18, 2009	3.3	5	1.5	5.16
S02E16	"Hit Me Baby"	February 25, 2009	3.3	5	1.7	4.89
S02E17	"Shelf Life"	March 11, 2009	3.4	5	1.8	5.21
S02E18	"3 Women"	March 18, 2009	...	...	1.5	4.22
S02E19	"5 Quarts"	March 25, 2009	...	...	1.4	4.32
S02E20	"Initiative 38"	April 1, 2009	3.7	6	1.5	5.70
S02E21	"One"	April 8, 2009	...	...	1.3	4.50

#	Timeslot	Season Premiere	Season Finale	Episodes	TV Season	Ranking	Viewers (in millions)
1	Wednesday 10:00 p.m.	September 26, 2007	December 5, 2007	11	2007–2008	#63	8.1
2	Wednesday 9:00 p.m.	September 29, 2008	April 8, 2009	21	2008–2009	N/A	5.77

==== International ratings ====
In Australia, TV ratings for the first episode of Life on Network Ten reached 1.085 million viewers, making it one of the top programs viewed for that day and timeslot. The season finale aired in that country (episode 8) on 21 November achieved the ratings of 908,000 viewers.

In the UK, the series is shown on ITV3. The series two premiere attracted 205,000 viewers.

In Germany, the series is shown on VOX. The first episode of the second season got 15% (3.5 million) viewers.

=== Awards and nominations ===
The show won a 2008 AFI Award for best television series. The show as nominated for the 2008 VES Award for "Outstanding Supporting Visual Effects in a Broadcast Program", losing to Fringe.
