= The Killer's Game =

2024 film by J.J. Perry

- Theatrical release poster
- Directed by: J. J. Perry
- Screenplay by: Rand Ravich; James Coyne
- Based on: The Killer's Game by Jay Bonansinga
- Produced by: Andrew Lazar; Steve Richards; Kia Jam
- Starring: Dave Bautista; Sofia Boutella; Terry Crews; Scott Adkins; Pom Klementieff; Ben Kingsley
- Cinematography: Flavio Martínez Labiano
- Edited by: Simon Smith
- Music by: Roque Baños
- Production companies: Mad Chance Productions; Endurance Media
- Distributed by: Lionsgate (United States); Amazon MGM Studios (International; under Prime Video)
- Release date: September 13, 2024
- Running time: 106 minutes
- Country: United States
- Language: English
- Budget: $30 million
- Box office: $5.9 million

The Killer's Game is a 2024 American action thriller film directed by J. J. Perry and written by Rand Ravich and James Coyne, based on the 1997 novel of the same name by Jay Bonansinga. The film stars Dave Bautista, Sofia Boutella, Terry Crews, Scott Adkins, Pom Klementieff, and Ben Kingsley.

The Killer's Game was released in the United States by Lionsgate on September 13, 2024. It received mixed reviews and was a box-office bomb.

== Plot ==
At a dance performance in Budapest, hitman Joe Flood carries out an assassination, but is spotted by guards. In the ensuing chaos, Joe spots a fallen dancer, Maize, and helps get her out safely. She tries to thank him, but Joe starts to suffer a headache and leaves before Maize can help him.

After an examination for his headaches, Joe finds Maize at her dance studio and returns her phone, which she lost during the previous mayhem. Maize and Joe soon fall for each other, with him lying about his profession to her. Joe is soon diagnosed with Creutzfeldt-Jakob disease, with his physician, Dr. Kagan, giving him roughly three months to live.

Joe tries to get his friend and handler Zvi to put a contract on him, which would allow Maize to collect life insurance off of Joe’s death, but Zvi refuses. Joe turns to Marianna Antoinette, another assassin and handler, to handle the contract. Marianna, whose father mentored Joe before he killed him, accepts the contract, and soon sends the hit out, which takes effect at midnight. That night, Joe publicly breaks up with Maize, and later explains his diagnosis in a drunken voice message.

Just before midnight, Dr. Kagan calls Joe to inform him that he was misdiagnosed, as his test results were switched with another patient. At midnight, Joe is attacked by the first of Marianna’s assassins, the Korean Goyang and his gang, whom he quickly kills. The Hungarian Langos brothers, who attack together with their motorcycles, follow, and Joe kills them too. Joe tries to cancel the contract, but Marianna refuses, and contacts every available hitman in Europe as she doubles the contract from the initial $2 million to $4 million. Creighton Lovedahl, who turned down the initial contract due to less money, joins the hunt, along with Scottish brothers Angus and Rory Mackenzie, the British strippers Ginni and Tonya, a.k.a. the Party Girls, and a Catalan dancing assassin called Botas.

Joe visits Zvi and his wife, Sharon, the latter of whom fixes his headaches and bad vision. Joe sets up traps at a nearby castle to lure the other assassins there. Most of the assassins arrive to attack Joe, but he quickly takes them out. Meanwhile, Lovedahl arrives in Budapest, where he is forced to partner with an aspiring assassin, Money. The two of them track down Maize to her apartment and take her captive. Lovedahl calls Joe through Maize's phone and tells them to meet at a nearby cemetery.

When Joe arrives to confront Lovedahl, Maize escapes, steals Lovedahl's car and rams into him before she takes Joe with her. A hit squad, led by Marianna's right hand man Max, shows up and fires on Joe. A furious Lovedahl has Max call Marianna and demands that she increase the contract to $6 million before he leaves Money behind. Meanwhile, Joe tells Maize that he is an assassin, and of his misdiagnosis, but that he is willing to retire to be with her. She then tells Joe that she is pregnant and would not want to raise a child with a murderer. Maize starts to pass out because one of Max's bullets hit her in the shoulder.

Joe brings Maize to a church, where the Priest, Father O'Brien gives them sanctuary as Joe tends to Maize. Joe proposes to Maize shortly after she wakes up, and O'Brien reluctantly agrees to marry them. The ceremony is interrupted by the arrival of Max and his men, who injure the priest shortly before Lovedahl shows up. Joe kills most of Max's squad before he pins Lovedahl under some scaffolding. Max tries to kill Joe, but Maize kills him first with a headshot, to her horror. Joe takes Maize out of the church and leaves an injured but alive Lovedahl there. Meanwhile, Zvi confronts Marianna at her compound and executes her for breaking the assassins' code. Joe and Maize later get married, and while he promises to retire from the assassin life, Maize tells him to consider the costs of raising a child, and suggests he not give it up entirely.

== Cast ==
- Dave Bautista as Joe Flood, a veteran assassin
- Sofia Boutella as Maize Arnaud, Joe's girlfriend
- Terry Crews as Creighton Lovedahl, a hitman after Joe
- Scott Adkins as Angus Mackenzie, Rory's brother and a hitman after Joe
- Pom Klementieff as Marianna Antoinette, a mysterious woman who has put a hit out on Joe.
- Ben Kingsley as Zvi Rabinowitz, Joe's mentor
- Marko Zaror as Emilio 'El Botas', a dancing hitman after Joe
- Alex Kingston as Sharon Rabinowitz, Zvi's wife
- Drew Galloway as Rory Mackenzie, Angus's brother and a hitman after Joe
- Shaina West as Tonya, Ginni's partner and a hitman after Joe
- Lucy Cork as Ginni, Tonya's partner and a hitman after Joe
- Daniel Bernhardt as Max, Marianna's henchman
- Lee Hoon as Goyang, a hitman hired by Marianna to kill Joe
- Dylan Moran as Father O'Brien, a priest
- Raffaello Degruttola as Dr. Kagen, a doctor who initially diagnoses Joe with a terminal illness

== Production ==
=== Early development ===
Originally titled Godforsaken, Rand Ravich wrote his adaptation of Jay Bonansinga's novel, The Killer's Game, on spec in the mid-1990s and sold his draft to New Line Cinema in December 1995. Intermedia would produce the film, with Rupert Wainwright attached to direct. Wesley Snipes was courted to star by July 2002. Production was expected to begin that fall. A month later, talks began with Mike van Diem to direct. New Line offered the film to a wide array of directors, including John Woo, Wolfgang Petersen, Alex Proyas, and Renny Harlin, but failed to attract any to sign on.

In August 2004, rights transitioned to Paramount Pictures; Intermedia and Andrew Lazar were attached to produce while Simon Kinberg handled rewrites. Michael Keaton was at one point attached to star, while Simon Crane and Pitof were considered to direct. Development came to a standstill in 2006 when Intermedia closed down.

=== Resurrection ===
By December 2015, Broad Green Pictures was in talks to acquire the rights. In February 2018, STXfilms took over, hiring D.J. Caruso to direct and Jason Statham to lead. By April 2019, Statham had exited and was replaced by Dave Bautista. Ice Cube joined the cast in June 2019. In September, Morena Baccarin and Kris Wu joined the cast. Caruso and Peter Landesman rewrote the script ahead of a planned production start of December 2, 2019, in the Dominican Republic.

Development quietly halted again until May 2023 when distribution rights shifted to Lionsgate, with J.J. Perry directing, and James Coyne hired to rewrite the script. Bautista and Ice Cube remained in the cast, with Sofia Boutella and Ben Kingsley added. In July, Pom Klementieff, Scott Adkins, Drew McIntyre and Marko Zaror were among new additions to the cast. In March 2024, it was announced Terry Crews was to star, replacing Ice Cube.

=== Filming ===
Principal photography began in July 2023 in Budapest, with the film having been granted an interim agreement waiver to proceed amid the 2023 SAG-AFTRA strike.

Final writing credits were submitted in November 2023; screenplay credit was given to Ravich and Coyne and the offscreen additional literary material credit was attributed to Caruso, Nick Cassavetes, John Joseph Connolly, Michael Dowse, Cory Goodman, Kinberg, Landesman, Brian Rudnick, and Kurt Wimmer.

== Release ==
The Killer's Game was released in the United States and Canada on September 13, 2024. It released on VOD and digital platforms on October 4, 2024.

== Reception ==
=== Box office ===
The Killer's Game grossed $5.4 million in the United States, and $523,260 in Russia, for a worldwide total of $5.9 million.

In the United States, The Killer's Game was released alongside Speak No Evil and Am I Racist?, and was projected to gross around $5 million from 2,623 theaters in its opening weekend. The film made $1.06 million on its first day, including $300,000 from Thursday night previews. It took in $2.6 million, finishing seventh for the weekend.

=== Critical response ===
On the review aggregator website Rotten Tomatoes, 47% of 50 critics' reviews are positive, with an average rating of 5.1/10. The website's consensus reads: "While it can be commended for refreshingly casting the reliable Dave Bautista in a romantic role, this otherwise tepid hitman comedy doesn't make many inventive moves on the board." Metacritic, which uses a weighted average, assigned the film a score of 36 out of 100, based on 10 critics, indicating "generally unfavorable" reviews. Audiences polled by CinemaScore gave the film an average grade of "B+" on an A+ to F scale, while those surveyed by PostTrak gave it a 63% overall positive score, with 45% saying they would definitely recommend it.
