= The Maker (film) =

- Theatrical release poster
- Directed by: Tim Hunter
- Written by: Rand Ravich
- Produced by: Andrew Lazar; Demitri Samaha
- Starring: Matthew Modine; Mary-Louise Parker; Jonathan Rhys-Meyers; Fairuza Balk
- Cinematography: Hubert Taczanowski
- Edited by: Scott Chestnut
- Music by: Carol Sue Baker
- Production companies: Demitri Samaha Productions; Mad Chance; Millennium Films
- Distributed by: Amuse Video
- Release date: October 17, 1997
- Running time: 98 minutes
- Country: United States
- Language: English

The Maker is a 1997 American drama film written by Rand Ravich and directed by Tim Hunter. It premiered in the United States on October 17, 1997.

== Plot ==
Josh is a high school boy who lives with his adoptive parents and is involved in little crimes with his friends, including young lesbian Bella. His elder brother, Walter, returns home after leaving home ten years prior when he was 18 and not being heard of all those years. Walter starts to involve Josh in various new criminal activities, including robbery.

== Cast ==
- Matthew Modine as Walter Schmeiss
- Mary-Louise Parker as Officer Emily Peck
- Jonathan Rhys Meyers as Josh Minnell
- Fairuza Balk as Bella Sotto
- Michael Madsen as Skarney
- Kate McGregor-Stewart as Mother Minnell

== See also ==
- List of American films of 1997
