= Oink (1995 film) =

Oink is a 1995 short film directed by Rand Ravich, who later directed The Astronaut's Wife. Oink premiered at the Sundance Film Festival in 1995.

== Cast ==
- Stephen Berger as Bert Mittleman
- Kathryn Miller as Mrs. Mittleman
- Kit Bowen as Desire
- Carl Ballantine as The Doctor
