= Dinner with Audrey =

- Directed by: Abe Sylvia
- Written by: Kara Holden
- Produced by: Ashok Amritraj; Priya Amritraj; Andrew Lazar; Vanessa Humphrey; Andrew Calof
- Starring: Thomasin McKenzie; Ansel Elgort; Michael Shannon; Miranda Richardson; Judy Greer
- Cinematography: Minka Farthing-Kohl
- Production companies: Wayfarer Studios; Hyde Park Entertainment; Mad Chance Productions
- Country: United States
- Language: English

Dinner with Audrey is an upcoming American biographical drama film directed by Abe Sylvia and written by Kara Holden. It stars Thomasin McKenzie, Ansel Elgort, Michael Shannon, Miranda Richardson, and Judy Greer.

== Premise ==
Dinner with Audrey explores the true-life 40-year friendship and collaboration between Audrey Hepburn and Hubert de Givenchy over some pivotal years. Their collaboration sparked over the course of one magical, fashion-filled night in Paris, France, as that dinner would lead their friendship and decades-long working relationship as well.

== Cast ==
- Thomasin McKenzie as Audrey Hepburn
- Ansel Elgort as Hubert de Givenchy
- Michael Shannon as Billy Wilder
- Miranda Richardson as Ella van Heemstra
- Judy Greer as Edith Head

== Production ==
In November 2025, it was announced that Abe Sylvia would be directing a biographical drama film depicting the friendship between Audrey Hepburn and Hubert de Givenchy, with Thomasin McKenzie and Ansel Elgort cast as their respective characters, with Michael Shannon in talks to join. In May 2026, Miranda Richardson and Judy Greer joined the cast as Ella van Heemstra and Edith Head, with Shannon also confirmed.

=== Filming ===
Principal photography began in late April 2026, in Budapest. Filming wrapped in October 2026. Minka Farthing-Kohl served as the cinematographer.
