= Far Shariat =

American television producer

- Born: April 6, 1976 (age 49)

Far Shariat (born April 6, 1976) is a film and television producer. He was a producer on the film Confessions of a Dangerous Mind. Shariat was an executive producer for NBC television drama series Life. Shariat has worked with Life creator Rand Ravich on films such as Confessions of a Dangerous Mind, The Astronaut's Wife, The Maker and Crisis.
