= Oink (payment service) =

American payment processor

REGO Payment Architectures, Inc.
- Company type: Public
- Industry: E-Commerce
- Founded: 2008
- Founders: Jo Webber, Pradeep Ittycheria
- Headquarters: Palm Beach, Florida
- Area served: United States
- Key people: John Coyne, CEO; David Knight, COO
- Products: Youth payment system

Oink, formerly Virtual Piggy, was a payment platform that allowed children to make purchases online or in-store while keeping parents in control of spending. It was discontinued in 2016.

== Company history ==
REGO Payment Architectures, Inc. initially launched in 2008 as a product of Moggle Inc., located in Philadelphia, Pennsylvania. Founder Jo Webber and co-founder Pradeep Ittycheria created Virtual Piggy to provide a safe way for children to transact online. It became a publicly traded company in October 2008. In March 2011, the Virtual Piggy service was awarded the TRUSTe Children's Privacy Seal, and was certified COPPA compliant. In Fall 2011, the company dropped the Moggle Inc. name, and became Virtual Piggy, Inc. It was publicly traded with the symbol VPIG. March 2012 saw founder and chairman Jo Webber take on the role of CEO. The company relocated to Hermosa Beach, California in June 2012.

The technology was COPPA-compliant, The company was featured in many articles as the first company to digitize a teen's monthly allowance. Forbes referred to the service as "PayPal for Kids".

Oink was the first service that enabled transactions for under-13 users that were COPPA-compliant. This meant the service was the only way for someone 12 or younger to make an online purchase without violating these laws regulated by the FTC.

On January 28, 2014, Oink announced that over one million users had signed up.

On November 21, 2014, Oink announced the launch of their prepaid card on the Discover Network - allowing parents to control their children's in-store spending as well.

The notability of this technology was recognized by Frost & Sullivan, who gave Virtual Piggy their 2012 Entrepreneurial Company of the Year award in Digital Media.

As of December 4, 2013, the name of the Virtual Piggy youth payments solution changed to Oink. The corporate name remained Virtual Piggy.

== Functionality ==
REGO Payment Architectures, Inc.'s service worked by allowing a parent to register an account, which could then set up parameters for child accounts. Because the parent account stored all personal information, a child was able to make a purchase without providing any of their personal information. A parent first registered their own account. The parent could then assign individual child accounts to multiple children. Within each child account, the parent was able to control how much money was available to the child, how often they received new funds (a monthly allowance), which merchants the child was allowed to buy from, and any desired spending limits. The parent was also able to "turn off" the child accounts, and request notifications when purchases were made. The child was able to log into their account, which tracked recent purchases, funds available, savings goals and charitable donations. In June 2015, Oink updated their app to include P2P payments functionality between users and family and friends.

== User experience ==
Upon checkout, the child chose the Oink payment option. The child was then prompted to enter their Oink username and password. If there were sufficient funds in the account, and the purchase matched the parameters set up by the parent, the transaction was completed.

Because the child never provided any personally identifiable information as a part of the purchase process (such as a name, residential address, email address or credit card), the transaction was COPPA compliant. The merchant was able to ship any physical items to the child using the mailing address provided in the parent account.
