= Dilshad Vadsaria =

American actress

- Born: 1985 or 1986 (age 39–40); Karachi, Sindh, Pakistan
- Occupation: Actress
- Years active: 2006–present
- Website: www.dilshadvadsaria.com

Dilshad Vadsaria (born c. 1985) is an American actress. She is known for her role as Rebecca Logan on the ABC Family television program Greek and for the film 30 Minutes or Less.

== Early life and education ==
Vadsaria was born in Karachi, Pakistan, and is of Gujarati and Portuguese descent. She moved with her family to the United States at the age of six and spent her childhood in various parts of the country, including Chicago, Richmond, and Philadelphia. She attended the University of Delaware.

== Career ==
Vadsaria's professional acting career began in 2006 with a part in an episode of the television program Vanished. In 2007 she landed a regular part on the television program Greek, where she played the character Rebecca Logan, one of the Zeta Beta Zeta sisters, a role she portrayed through the show's run.

She also appeared in the movie Rapture where she played the role of a teenage mother. In 2011, Vadsaria appeared in the comedy film 30 Minutes or Less where she portrayed Kate Flanning who is the twin sister of Aziz Ansari's character Chet.

She appeared in the NCIS episode "Legend (Part 2)" (the backdoor pilot for NCIS: Los Angeles) as Shakira. In 2010, Vadsaria appeared on the Bones season 5 episode "The Dentist in the Ditch" as Padme Booth, a role she reprised in 2015. In 2012, she began a recurring role on the television series Revenge.

In 2015, Vadsaria was cast in the major role of Mary Goodwin on the Fox fantasy drama Second Chance (previously titled The Frankenstein Code and Lookinglass).

== Filmography ==
Television and film roles
Year	Title	Role	Notes
2006	Vanished	Agent Nanji	Episode: "The Tunnel"
2006	Rapture	N/A	Film
2007–2011	Greek	Rebecca Logan	Main role
2009	NCIS	Shakira Zayd	Episode: "Legend: Part 2"
2010, 2015	Bones	Padme Dalaj	Episodes: "The Dentist in the Ditch", "The Loyalty in the Lie"
2010	CSI: Miami	Jody	Episode: "Miami, We Have a Problem"
2011	30 Minutes or Less	Kate Flanning	Film
2012	Melissa & Joey	Ariel	Episode: "Mixed Doubles"
2012–2013	Revenge	Padma Lahari	Recurring role season 2; 15 episodes
2014	Murder in the First	Jasmine Lee	Episodes: "Who's Your Daddy", "Win Some, Lose Some"
2015	Castle	Angela	Episode: "The Wrong Stuff"
2016	Second Chance	Mary Goodwin	Main role
2016	Notorious	Sarah Keaton	3 episodes
2017	Freedom Fighters: The Ray	Jenny Knight/Phantom Lady	Web series; main voice role
2018	The Librarians	Sarina	Episode: "And the Disenchanted Forest"
2019	Cloak & Dagger	Lia Dewan	Recurring role (season 2)

== Awards and nominations ==
Year	Result	Award	Category	Nominated work
2010	Nominated	NAMIC Vision Awards	Best Performance: Comedy	Greek
