= Rand Ravich =

American screenwriter

- Education: Haverford College
- Occupations: Film director; producer; television director; writer

Rand Ravich is a film and television director, writer, and producer. He wrote and directed the 1999 science fiction thriller The Astronaut's Wife, starring Johnny Depp and Charlize Theron. He was a producer on the film Confessions of a Dangerous Mind, and also wrote the screenplays for the Candyman sequel Candyman: Farewell to the Flesh and the 1997 movie The Maker. Ravich is the creator of the NBC television drama series Life. He was also the show's executive producer and one of the writers. He created the 2014 NBC thriller drama Crisis.

He attended Arthur L. Johnson Regional High School, but graduated from Solomon Schechter, a small Jewish day school, before attending Haverford College in Pennsylvania, graduating in 1984. He majored in philosophy, studying with Richard J. Bernstein, Aryeh Kosman, and Paul Desjardins. Professor Desjardin's name, and many other references to Haverford, crop up regularly in Life). While at Haverford, Rand came under the tutelage of Professor Bob Butman, who fostered Rand's creative interests and pushed him on the path to his writing career. Ravich wrote also the screenplay for the Fox Television Network drama-horror series Second Chance. which is executive produced along with Howard Gordon. He wrote and executive produced the pilot episode, which was directed by Michael Cuesta.

== Filmography ==
Film

Year	Title	Director	Writer	Notes
1991	Crime Lords	No	Yes	Direct-to-video
1995	Oink	Yes	No	Short film
1995	Candyman: Farewell to the Flesh	No	Yes	
1997	The Maker	No	Yes	Also co-producer
1999	The Astronaut's Wife	Yes	Yes	
2024	The Killer's Game	No	Yes	

TV movies

Year	Title	Writer	Executive Producer
2005	N.Y.-70	Yes	Yes
2006	The Time Tunnel	Yes	Yes
2010	Edgar Floats	Yes	Yes

TV series

Year	Title	Writer	Creator	Executive Producer
2007–2009	Life	Yes	Yes	Yes
2014	Crisis	Yes	Yes	Yes
2016	Second Chance	Yes	Yes	Yes
