= The Astronaut's Wife =

1999 film by Rand Ravich

- Theatrical release poster
- Directed by: Rand Ravich
- Written by: Rand Ravich
- Produced by: Andrew Lazar
- Starring: Johnny Depp; Charlize Theron; Joe Morton; Clea DuVall
- Cinematography: Allen Daviau
- Edited by: Tim Alverson; Steve Mirkovich
- Music by: George S. Clinton
- Production company: Mad Chance Productions
- Distributed by: New Line Cinema
- Release date: August 27, 1999
- Running time: 109 minutes
- Country: United States
- Language: English
- Budget: $34 million
- Box office: $19.6 million

The Astronaut's Wife is a 1999 American science fiction thriller film directed and written by Rand Ravich, in his feature directorial debut. It stars Johnny Depp and Charlize Theron.

Released on August 27, 1999 by New Line Cinema, the film was negatively received by critics, who drew unfavorable comparisons to Rosemary's Baby (1968), and panned its pacing and poor chemistry between the lead performers. Additionally, it was a box office bomb, grossing $19.6 million against a $34 million budget.

== Plot ==
Spencer Armacost is an astronaut working for NASA, and his wife Jillian is a second-grade teacher. While he and Alex Streck are walking in space on a mission, an explosion knocks out their communication with the command center.

They land safely, but when their spouses arrive to see them they are in the hospital; both are asleep until they recover. Armacost eventually wakes up without problems, but Streck has a medical emergency requiring him to have an electrical cardioversion. Neither speaks about the in-flight emergency. Armacost accepts a position with a New York-based company, McLaren. At a farewell party, Streck's aggressive behavior catches Jillian's attention before he suddenly dies from what NASA attributes to a stroke. Streck's wife, Natalie, electrocutes herself in the bath with a radio.

In New York at a party, Jillian asks Spencer to tell her about the space walk incident. He answers vaguely, and then has aggressive sex with her. Soon afterward, she finds out she is pregnant with twins. She tells the doctor that earlier in her life, after her parents died, she sought psychiatric care because she started to see her loved ones dead, including herself.

Sherman Reese has been terminated from NASA because he continued to insist that something was wrong with Spencer, though all tests came back normal. Reese confronts Jillian to warn her, and she leaves in fear, wanting to believe he is crazy but knowing he is right about Spencer being different. Jillian calls Reese and he tells her that Natalie was pregnant with twins at the time of her suicide. Jillian asks what the autopsy showed about the twins and Reese tells Jillian that he needs to meet her in person to show her. Spencer intercepts him, and he goes missing. As a backup plan, he has sent her a key to a self storage locker that has a VHS video cassette that explains that there was a signal in space near Spencer and Streck when they lost contact with NASA. He believes the signal was an alien that wanted to get to Earth and traveled as a radio wave through space, taking over Spencer's body. He believes it will use her twins to pilot the McLaren plane that it is designing that disables warfare machinery. Jillian attempts a medical abortion but is thwarted by Spencer who slaps her. She throws herself down a flight of stairs and wakes up in the hospital. Spencer tells her that the twins survived the fall and intimidates her to keep silent about what had happened.

In a dream, Jillian sees her sister, Nan, killed by Spencer when she questions why he has Reese's briefcase. Jillian leaves the hospital on her own but Spencer follows her because of his connection with the twins inside her. At home, Jillian barricades the door and goes into the room where she dreamed her sister was killed. She sees her body on the floor, but then it is gone, presumably a vision. When Spencer breaks his way into the apartment, she has flooded the kitchen floor with water, with a radio in the sink and an extension cord plugged into the wall. She holds the ends of the cords in each hand and tells Spencer to stay away from her. She notices bloody nail marks on Spencer's hand and she knows that her sister really is dead, as she dreamed. She tells Spencer she does not know who he is, that he killed her sister and her husband. He tells her he did, and that he lives inside of her now. Water begins pouring down from the ceiling, as Jillian turned on all of the water in the bathroom upstairs. Spencer is engulfed in the water, Jillian lifts her feet off the wet floor, connects the cords and electrocutes the alien. The alien leaves Spencer's body and transmits into Jillian.

Jillian has remarried and her twin sons are off on their first day of school. Her sons look back before boarding the bus with a look on their face before they smile and are on their way. Jillian assures the stepfather that he is now their father.

== Cast ==
- Johnny Depp as Commander Spencer Armacost
- Charlize Theron as Jillian Armacost
- Joe Morton as Sherman Reese, NASA Representative
- Clea DuVall as Nan
- Donna Murphy as Natalie Streck
- Nick Cassavetes as Capt. Alex Streck
- Samantha Eggar as Dr. Patraba
- Gary Grubbs as NASA Director
- Blair Brown as Shelly McLaren
- Tom Noonan as Jackson McLaren
- Tom O'Brien as Allen Dodge
- Lucy Lin as Shelly Carter
- Michael Crider as Pat Elliott
- Edward Kerr as Pilot
- Dylan Sprouse as Twin
- Cole Sprouse as Twin
- Rondi Reed as Dr. Conlin

== Production ==
In May 1997, it was reported that New Line Cinema had acquired Rand Ravich's screenplay The Astronaut's Wife with Ravich slated to make his directorial debut on the film, which was described as a psychological horror in the vein of Rosemary's Baby. New Line President Michael De Luca acquired the screenplay following interest from several competing studios including Columbia Pictures. In August of that year, it was announced Charlize Theron and Johnny Depp were in negotiations to play the film's leads.

== Reception ==
=== Box office ===
The film grossed $4 million in its opening weekend, and finished with $10.7 million; it made an additional $8.9 million in foreign markets, bringing its total box office gross to $19.6 million.

=== Critical response ===
Review aggregator website Rotten Tomatoes gives the film an approval rating of 14% based on 58 reviews, with an average rating is 4.26/10. The site's critics consensus reads: "Despite the best efforts of its talented leads, The Astronaut's Wife moves at a snail's pace and fails to generate enough intrigue to keep viewers engaged." Metacritic assigned the film a weighted average score of 37 out of 100, based on 17 critics, indicating "generally unfavorable reviews". Audiences polled by CinemaScore gave the film an average grade of "D" on an A+ to F scale.

Joe Leydon of Variety wrote, "Rosemary's Baby gets an extraterrestrial twist in The Astronaut's Wife, an aggressively stylish but dramatically flaccid drama that plays like an upscale reprise of a '50s sci-fi potboiler," while Owen Gleiberman of Entertainment Weekly rated it C+ and wrote, "The movie is far from incompetent; it simply has too few surprises to justify its indulgent atmosphere of malignant revelation." Janet Maslin of The New York Times wrote that the direction was better than she expected but the writing was "ridiculously derivative," while Mick LaSalle of The San Francisco Chronicle stated, "The movie might not be perfect, but it deserved better than to be dumped into theaters. I rather enjoyed it." Kevin Thomas of the Los Angeles Times described it as "a moderately diverting thriller that builds suspense and entertains effectively".

== Awards ==
The Astronaut's Wife was nominated for Best Film at the Sitges - Catalan International Film Festival in 1999.
