= King rat (animal) =

Conservation status
- Endangered (IUCN 3.1)

Scientific classification
- Kingdom: Animalia
- Phylum: Chordata
- Class: Mammalia
- Order: Rodentia
- Family: Muridae
- Genus: Uromys
- Species: U. rex

Binomial name
- Uromys rex (Thomas, 1888)

Species of rodent

The king rat (Uromys rex), or rat king, is a large species of rodent in the family Muridae. It is endemic to the island of Guadalcanal in the Solomon Islands. Like the two other species of rodent in Guadalcanal, it is placed in the genus Uromys. It lives in trees and is larger than Uromys porculus but smaller than Uromys imperator.
