= Guadalcanal rat =

Conservation status
- Critically endangered, possibly extinct (IUCN 3.1)

Scientific classification
- Kingdom: Animalia
- Phylum: Chordata
- Class: Mammalia
- Order: Rodentia
- Family: Muridae
- Genus: Uromys
- Species: U. porculus

Binomial name
- Uromys porculus Thomas, 1904

Possibly extinct species of rodent

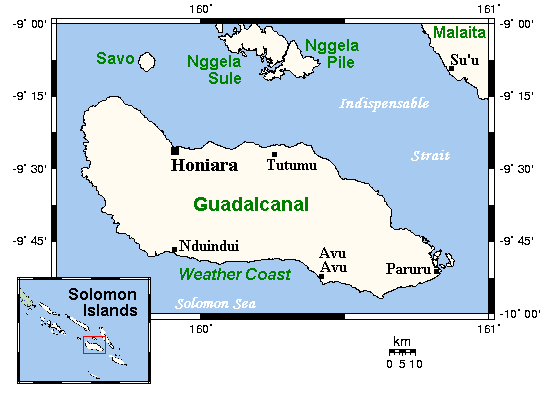
Guadalcanal Island of the Solomon Islands, the rat's observed habitat and namesake

The Guadalcanal rat (Uromys porculus) is a species of rodent in the family Muridae. It was found only in the Solomon Islands. The species was collected between 1886 and 1888 and has not been seen since. It is possibly extinct.

== Description ==
The only known skull of the Guadalcanal rat is clearly elongate and narrow, but has the molars so worn that few details of the crown remain. The details in the skull are described as similar to other members of the genus Uromys, specifically Uromys rex and Uromus imperator. The species also had a very short tail, indicating it was possibly terrestrial.

== History ==
The only known specimen of Guadacanal rat was described in 1904 by Oldfield Thomas, although it was most likely collected at or around the same time as similar species Uromys rex and Uromus imperator in the late 1880s. The species was registered in 1889 and was collected by Charles Morris Woodford at Aola village in the Solomon Islands.

The species has not been seen since this collection and there is no local knowledge of the species, indicating it is most likely extinct.

=== Genus Name ===
When it was first named in 1904 by Oldfield Thomas, the Guadacanal rat was described as a species of Uromys. Later, it was transferred to Melomys, before being placed once again in Uromys, once more in Melomys, until it was returned to Uromys where it is currently placed.
