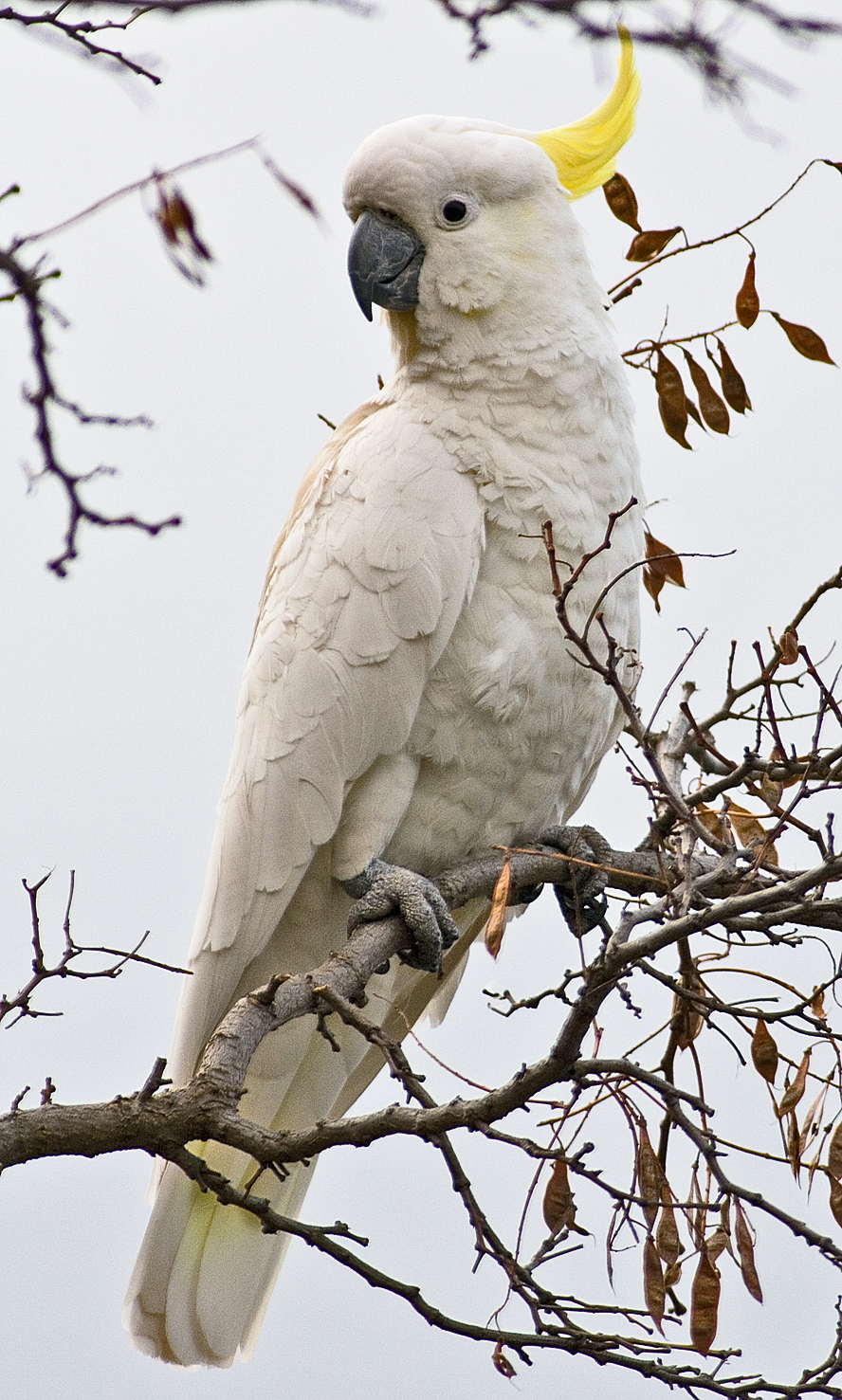
- Sulphur-crested cockatoo

Scientific classification
- Kingdom: Animalia
- Phylum: Chordata
- Class: Aves
- Order: Psittaciformes
- Superfamily: Cacatuoidea
- Family: Cacatuidae; G.R. Gray 1840

Type genus
- Cacatua Vieillot 1817

Genera
- Cacatua; Callocephalon; Calyptorhynchus; Eolophus; Lophochroa; Nymphicus; Probosciger; Zanda
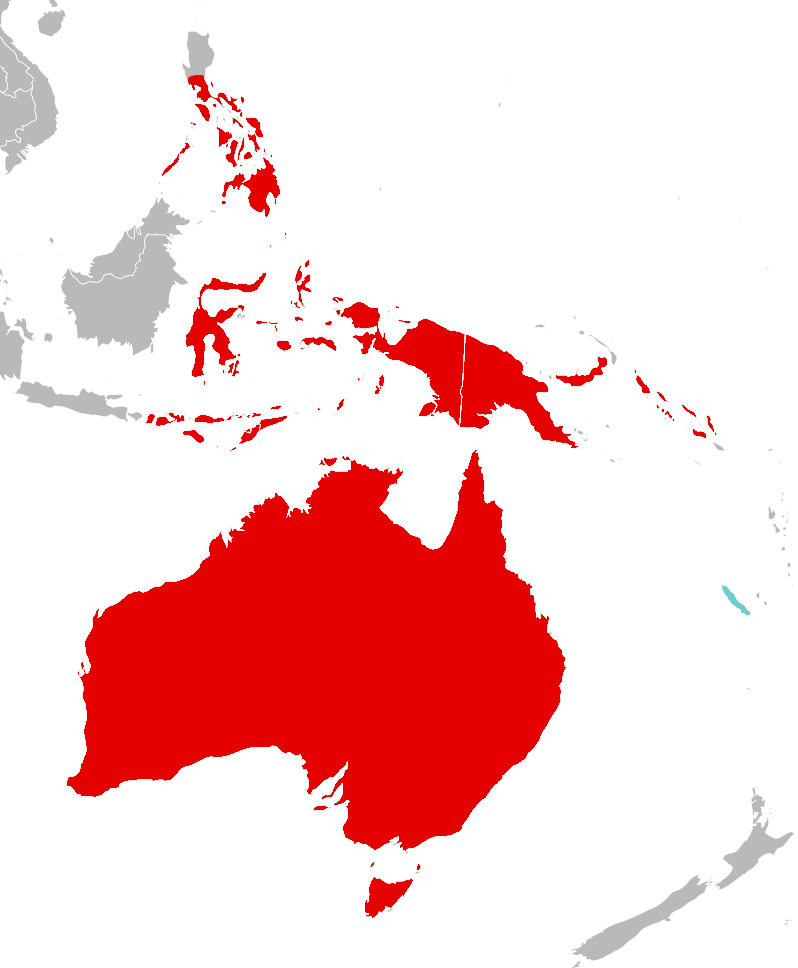
- Current range of cockatoos – red Finds of recent fossils – blue

Synonyms
- Plyctolophinae Vigors 1825

= Cockatoo =

Any bird in the family Cacatuidae

A cockatoo is any of the 22 species of parrots belonging to the family Cacatuidae, the only family in the superfamily Cacatuoidea, native to Australasia. Along with the Psittacoidea (true parrots) and Strigopoidea (New Zealand parrots), they make up the order Psittaciformes. The family has a mainly Australasian distribution, ranging from the Philippines and the eastern Indonesian islands of Wallacea to New Guinea, the Solomon Islands and Australia.

Cockatoos are recognisable by their prominent crests and curved bills. Their plumage is generally less colourful than that of other parrots, being mainly white, grey, or black and often with coloured features in the crest, cheeks, or tail. On average, they are larger than other parrots; however, the cockatiel, the smallest cockatoo species, is medium-sized. The phylogenetic position of the cockatiel remains unresolved, except that it is one of the earliest offshoots of the cockatoo lineage. The remaining species are in two main clades. The five large black-coloured cockatoos of the genus Calyptorhynchus form one branch. The second and larger branch is formed by the genus Cacatua, comprising 12 species of white-plumaged cockatoos and three monotypic genera that branched off earlier, namely the pink and grey galah, the mainly grey gang-gang cockatoo and the large black-plumaged palm cockatoo.

Cockatoos prefer to eat seeds, tubers, corms, fruit, flowers, and insects. They often feed in large flocks, particularly when ground-feeding. Cockatoos are monogamous and nest in tree hollows. Some cockatoo species have been adversely affected by habitat loss, particularly from a shortage of suitable nesting hollows after large, mature trees are cleared; conversely, some species have adapted well to human changes and are considered agricultural pests.

Cockatoos are popular birds in aviculture, but their needs are difficult to meet. The cockatiel is the easiest cockatoo species to maintain and is by far the most frequently kept in captivity. White cockatoos are more commonly found in captivity than black cockatoos. Illegal trade in wild-caught birds contributes to the decline of some cockatoo species in the wild.

== Etymology ==
The word cockatoo dates from the 17th century and is derived from Dutch kaketoe, which in turn is from the Malay kakatua. Seventeenth-century variants include cacato, cockatoon and crockadore, and cokato, cocatore and cocatoo were used in the 18th century. In turn, the family Cacatuidae and genus Cacatua are derivations of these terms into Latin.

In Australian slang or vernacular speech, a person who is assigned to keep watch while others undertake clandestine or illegal activities, particularly gambling, may be referred to as a "cockatoo". Proprietors of small agricultural undertakings are often jocularly or slightly disparagingly referred to as "cocky farmers".

== Taxonomy ==
- Psittaciformes
  - - Strigopidae – New Zealand parrots
  - - Cacatuidae – cockatoos
    - - Psittacidae – African and New World parrots
      - Psittaculidae – Old World parrots

- - Cacatuidae
    - - Calyptorhynchus – black cockatoos (2 species)
      - Zanda – black cockatoos (3 species)
    - - Nymphicus – cockatiel
      - - Probosciger – palm cockatoo
        - - Callocephalon – gang-gang cockatoo
          - - Eolophus – galah
            - - Cacatua (genus)
                - Lophochroa – pink cockatoo
                - - Cacatua – white cockatoos (6 species)
                  - Licmetis – corellas (6 species)

Genus level cladogram of the cockatoos based on a 2023 molecular phylogenetic study by Brian Smith and collaborators. The number of species in each genus is from the list maintained by Frank Gill, Pamela Rasmussen and David Donsker on behalf of the International Ornithological Committee (IOC), now the International Ornithologists' Union.

The cockatoos were first defined as a subfamily Cacatuinae within the parrot family Psittacidae by English naturalist George Robert Gray in 1840, with Cacatua the first listed and type genus. This group has alternately been considered as either a full or subfamily by different authorities. American ornithologist James Lee Peters in his 1937 Check-list of Birds of the World and Sibley and Monroe in 1990 maintained it as a subfamily, while parrot expert Joseph Forshaw classified it as a family in 1973. Subsequent molecular studies indicate that the earliest offshoot from the original parrot ancestors were the New Zealand parrots of the family Strigopidae, and following this the cockatoos, now a well-defined group or clade, split off from the remaining parrots, which then radiated across the Southern Hemisphere and diversified into the many species of parrots, parakeets, macaws, lories, lorikeets, lovebirds and other true parrots of the superfamily Psittacoidea.

The relationships among various cockatoo genera are largely resolved, although the placement of the cockatiel (Nymphicus hollandicus) at the base of the cockatoos remains uncertain. The cockatiel is alternatively placed basal to all other cockatoo species, as the sister taxon to the black cockatoo species of the genus Calyptorhynchus or as the sister taxon to a clade consisting of the white and pink cockatoo genera as well as the palm cockatoo. The remaining species are within two main clades, one consisting of the black species of the genus Calyptorhynchus while the other contains the remaining species. According to most authorities, the second clade includes the black palm cockatoo (Probosciger), the grey and reddish galah (Eolophus), and the gang-gang cockatoo (Callocephalon), although Probosciger is sometimes placed basal to all other species. The remaining species are mainly white or slightly pinkish and all belong to the genus Cacatua. The genera Eolophus and Cacatua are hypomelanistic. The genus Cacatua is further subdivided into the subgenera Licmetis, commonly known as corellas, and Cacatua, referred to as white cockatoos. Confusingly, the term "white cockatoo" has also been applied to the whole genus. The five cockatoo species of the genus Calyptorhynchus are commonly known as black cockatoos, and are divided into two subgenera—Calyptorhynchus and Zanda. The former group are sexually dichromatic, with the females having prominently barred plumage. The two are also distinguished by differences in the food-begging calls of juveniles.

The fossil record of cockatoos is even more limited than that of parrots in general, with only one truly ancient cockatoo fossil known: a species of Cacatua, most probably subgenus Licmetis, found in Early Miocene (16–23 million years ago) deposits of Riversleigh, Australia. Although fragmentary, the remains are similar to the western corella and the galah. In Melanesia, subfossil bones of Cacatua species which apparently did not survive early human settlement have been found on New Caledonia and New Ireland. The bearing of these fossils on cockatoo evolution and phylogeny is fairly limited, although the Riversleigh fossil does allow tentative dating of the divergence of subfamilies.

=== Genera and species ===
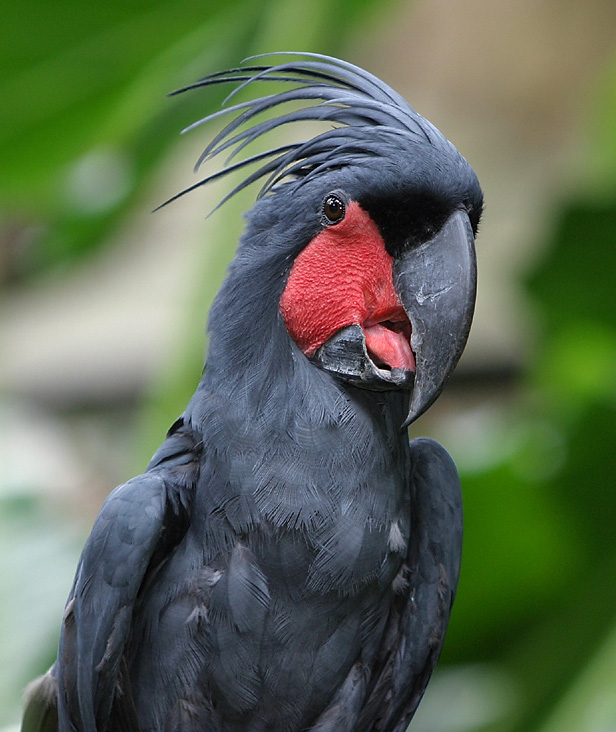
The palm cockatoo has a strong bill and red cheeks. At 55–60 cm (22–24 in) long and weighing 910–1,200 g (2.01–2.65 lb), it is the largest cockatoo.

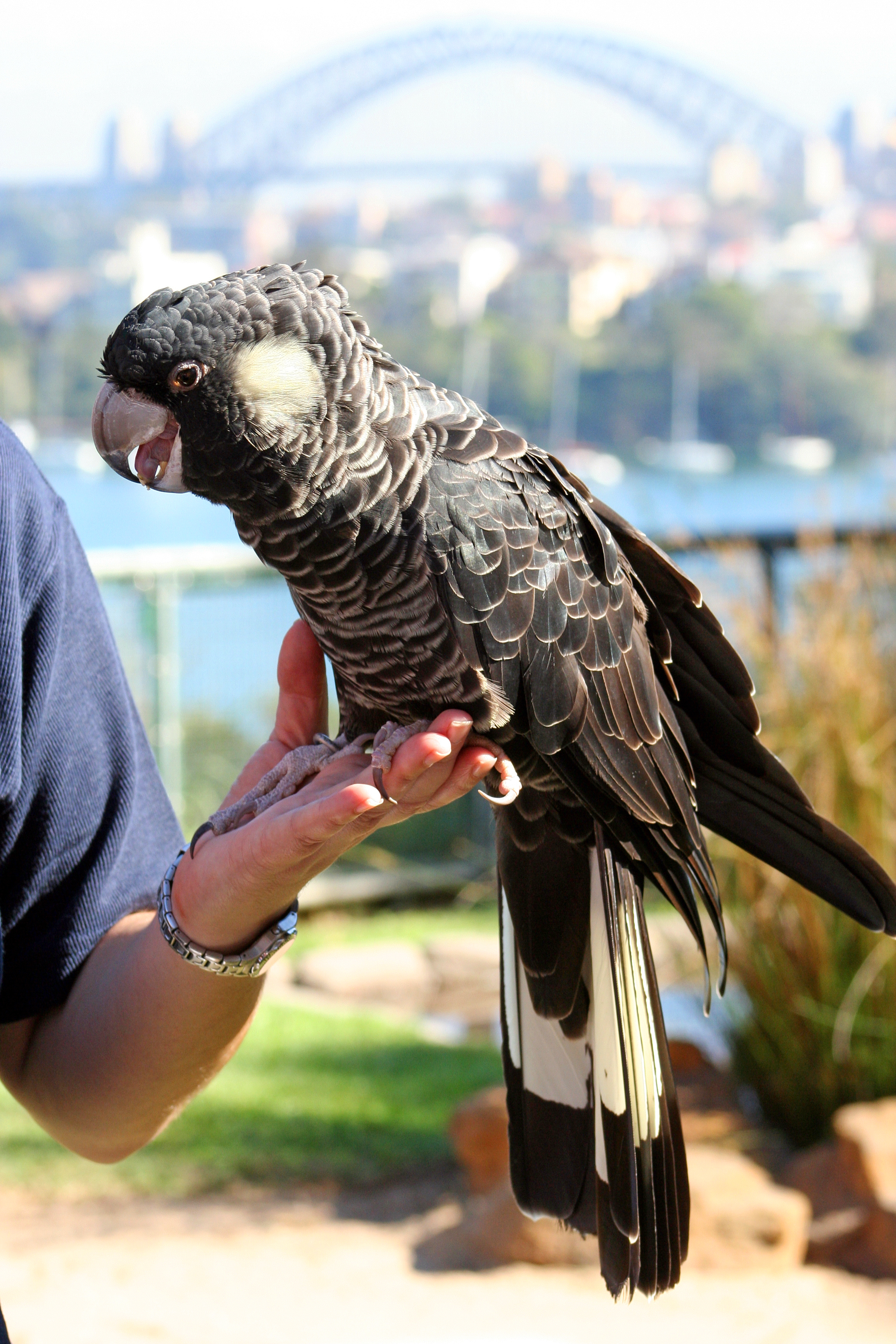
Carnaby's black cockatoo with a zoo keeper at Taronga Zoo Sydney, Australia

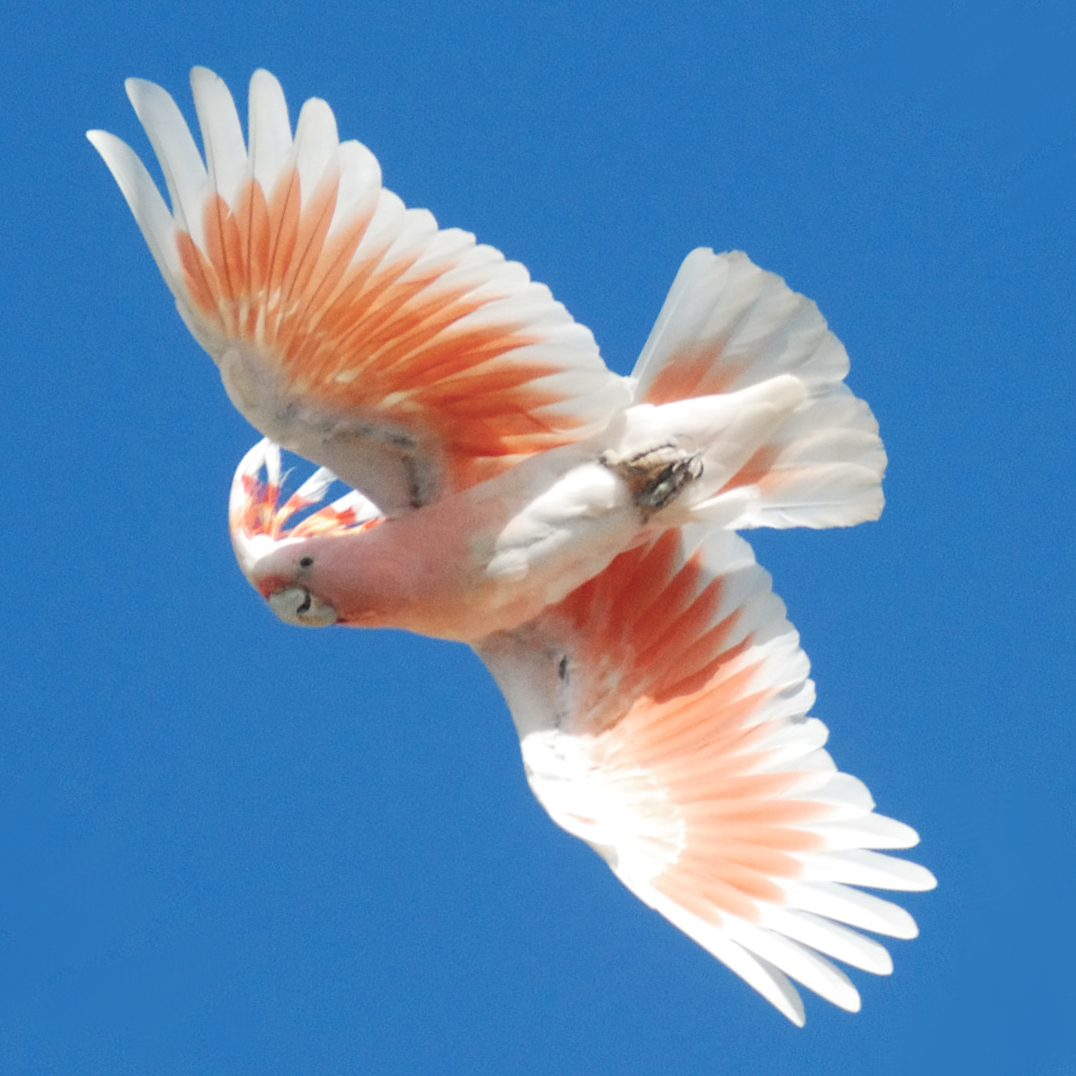
Pink cockatoo flying at Taronga Zoo Sydney.

There are about 44 different birds in the cockatoo family Cacatuidae including recognized subspecies. The current subdivision of this family is as follows: (Note: Parentheses around authority name indicate originally in a different genus.)

Subfamily Nymphicinae

- Genus Nymphicus
  - Cockatiel, Nymphicus hollandicus (Kerr, 1792)

Subfamily Calyptorhynchinae: Black cockatoos

- Genus Calyptorhynchus – black-and-red cockatoos
  - Red-tailed black cockatoo, Calyptorhynchus banksii (Latham, 1790) (5 subspecies)
  - Glossy black cockatoo, Calyptorhynchus lathami (Temminck, 1807) (3 subspecies)
- Genus Zanda – black-and-yellow/white cockatoos
  - Yellow-tailed black cockatoo, Zanda funerea (Shaw, 1794) (2–3 subspecies)
  - Carnaby's black cockatoo, Zanda latirostris (Carnaby, 1948)
  - Baudin's black cockatoo, Zanda baudinii (Lear, 1832)

Subfamily Cacatuinae

- Tribe Microglossini: One genus with one species, the black palm cockatoo.
  - Genus Probosciger
    - Palm cockatoo, Probosciger aterrimus (Gmelin, 1788) (4 subspecies)
- Tribe Cacatuini: Four genera of white, pink and grey species.
  - Genus Callocephalon
    - Gang-gang cockatoo, Callocephalon fimbriatum (Grant, 1803)
  - Genus Eolophus
    - Galah, Eolophus roseicapilla (Vieillot, 1817) (3 subspecies)
  - Genus Cacatua (13 species)
    - Subgenus Cacatua – true white cockatoos
      - Yellow-crested cockatoo or lesser sulphur-crested cockatoo, Cacatua sulphurea (Gmelin, 1788) (5 subspecies)
      - Citron-crested cockatoo, Cacatua citrinocristata (Fraser, 1844)
      - Sulphur-crested cockatoo, Cacatua galerita (Latham, 1790) (4 subspecies)
      - Blue-eyed cockatoo, Cacatua ophthalmica Sclater, 1864
      - White cockatoo or umbrella cockatoo, Cacatua alba (Müller, 1776)
      - Salmon-crested cockatoo or Moluccan cockatoo, Cacatua moluccensis (Gmelin, 1788)
    - Subgenus Licmetis – corellas
      - Long-billed corella, Cacatua tenuirostris (Kuhl, 1820)
      - Western corella, Cacatua pastinator (Gould, 1841) (2 subspecies)
      - Little corella (also bare-eyed cockatoo), Cacatua sanguinea Gould, 1843 (4 subspecies)
      - Tanimbar corella or Goffin's cockatoo, Cacatua goffiniana Roselaar and Michels, 2004
      - Solomons cockatoo or Ducorps's cockatoo, Cacatua ducorpsii Pucheran, 1853
      - Red-vented cockatoo or Philippine cockatoo, Cacatua haematuropygia (Müller, 1776)
    - Subgenus Lophochroa – pink cockatoos
      - Pink cockatoo or Major Mitchell's/Leadbeater's cockatoo, Cacatua leadbeateri (Vigors, 1831) (2 subspecies)

== Morphology ==
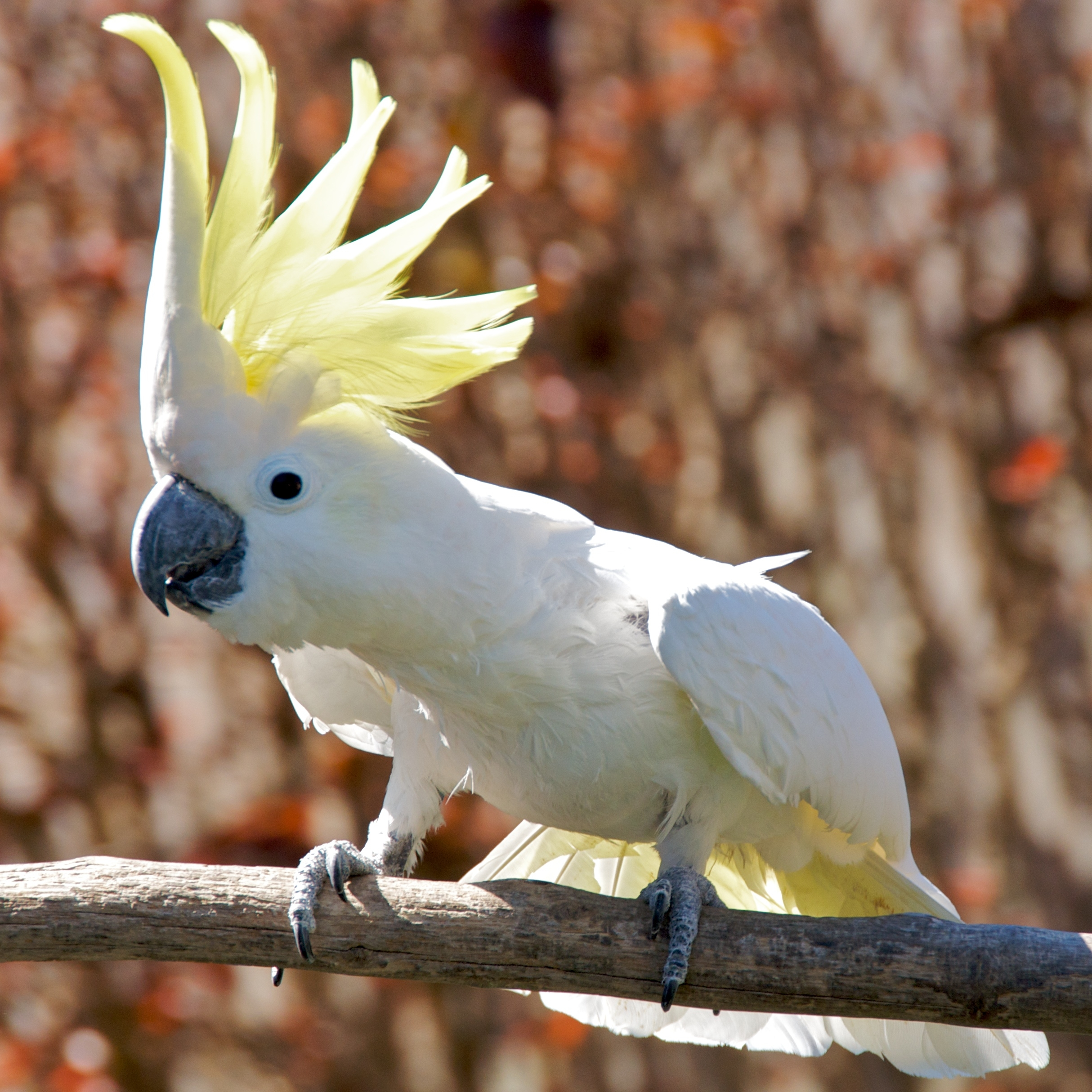
A captive sulphur-crested cockatoo displaying its crest in the U.S.

The cockatoos are generally medium to large parrots of stocky build, which range from 30–60 cm (12–24 in) in length and 300–1,200 g (0.66–2.65 lb) in weight; however, one species, the cockatiel, is considerably smaller and slimmer than the other species, being 32 cm (13 in) long (including its long pointed tail feathers) and 80–100 g (2.8–3.5 oz) in weight. The movable headcrest, which is present in all cockatoos, is spectacular in many species; it is raised when the bird lands from flying or when it is aroused. Cockatoos share many features with other parrots, including the characteristic curved beak shape and a zygodactyl foot, with the two middle toes forward and the two outer toes backward. They differ in the presence of an erectile crest and their lack of the Dyck texture feather composition which causes the bright blues and greens seen in true parrots.

Like other parrots, cockatoos have short legs, strong claws, a waddling gait and often use their strong bill as a third limb when climbing through branches. They generally have long broad wings used in rapid flight, with speeds up to 70 km/h (43 mph) being recorded for galahs. The members of the genus Calyptorhynchus and larger white cockatoos, such as the sulphur-crested cockatoo and the pink cockatoo, have shorter, rounder wings and a more leisurely flight.

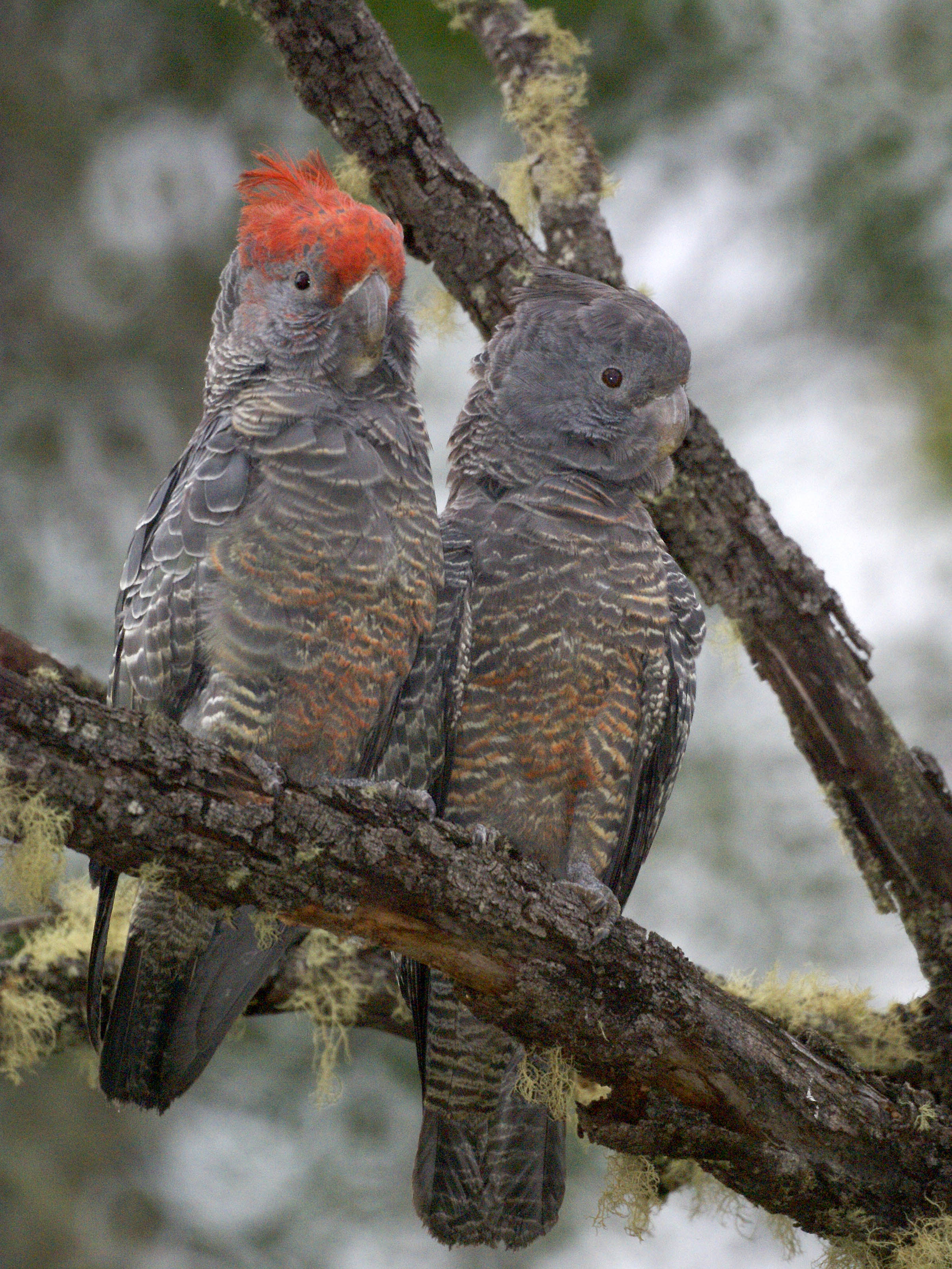
A pair of gang-gang cockatoos in NSW, Australia (male with red head feathers). Cockatoos make lasting pair bonds.

Cockatoos have a large bill, which is kept sharp by rasping the two jaws together when resting. The bill is complemented by a large muscular tongue which helps manipulate seeds inside the bill so that they can be de-husked before eating. During the de-husking, the lower jaw applies the pressure, the tongue holds the seed in place and the upper jaw acts as an anvil. The eye region of the skull is reinforced to support muscles which move the jaws sideways. The bills of male cockatoos are generally slightly larger than those of their female counterparts, but this size difference is quite marked in the palm cockatoo.

The plumage of the cockatoos is less brightly coloured than that of the other parrots, with species generally being either black, grey or white. Many species have smaller areas of colour on their plumage, often yellow, pink and red, usually on the crest or tail. The galah and Major Mitchell's cockatoo are more broadly coloured in pink tones. Several species have a brightly coloured bare area around the eye and face known as a periophthalmic ring; the large red patch of bare skin of the palm cockatoo is the most extensive and covers some of the face, while it is more restricted in some other species of white cockatoo, notably the corellas and blue-eyed cockatoo. The plumage of males and females is similar in most species. The plumage of the female cockatiel is duller than the male, but the most marked sexual dimorphism occurs in the gang-gang cockatoo and the two species of black cockatoos in the subgenus Calyptorhynchus, namely the red-tailed and glossy black cockatoos. The iris colour differs in a few species, being pink or red in the female galah and the pink cockatoo and red-brown in some other female white cockatoo species. The males all have dark brown irises.

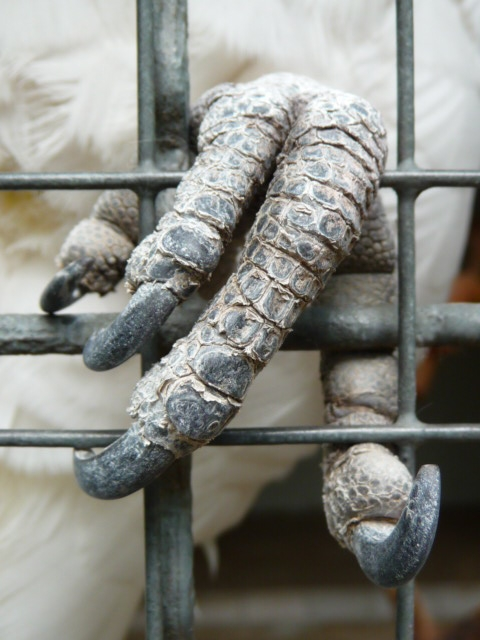
A white cockatoo's left foot clasping aviary bars showing claws, scaly skin and zygodactyly—the middle two toes forward and the outer two toes backward.

Cockatoos maintain their plumage with frequent preening throughout the day. They remove dirt and oil and realign feather barbs by nibbling their feathers. They also preen other birds' feathers that are otherwise hard to get at. Cockatoos produce preen-oil from a gland on their lower back and apply it by wiping their plumage with their heads or already oiled feathers. Powder-down is produced by specialised feathers in the lumbar region and distributed by the preening cockatoo all over the plumage.

Moulting is very slow and complex. Black cockatoos appear to replace their flight feathers one at a time, their moult taking two years to complete. This process is much shorter in other species, such as the galah and long-billed corella, which each take around six months to replace all their flight feathers.

=== Voice ===
The vocalisations of cockatoos are loud and harsh. They serve a number of functions, including allowing individuals to recognize one another, alerting others of predators, indicating individual moods, maintaining the cohesion of a flock and as warnings when defending nests. The use of calls and number of specific calls varies by species; the Carnaby's black cockatoo has as many as 15 types of call, whereas others, such as the pink cockatoo, have fewer. Some, like the gang-gang cockatoo, are comparatively quiet but do have softer growling calls when feeding. In addition to vocalisations, palm cockatoos communicate over large distances by drumming on a dead branch with a stick. Cockatoo species also make a characteristic hissing sound when threatened.

== Distribution and habitat ==
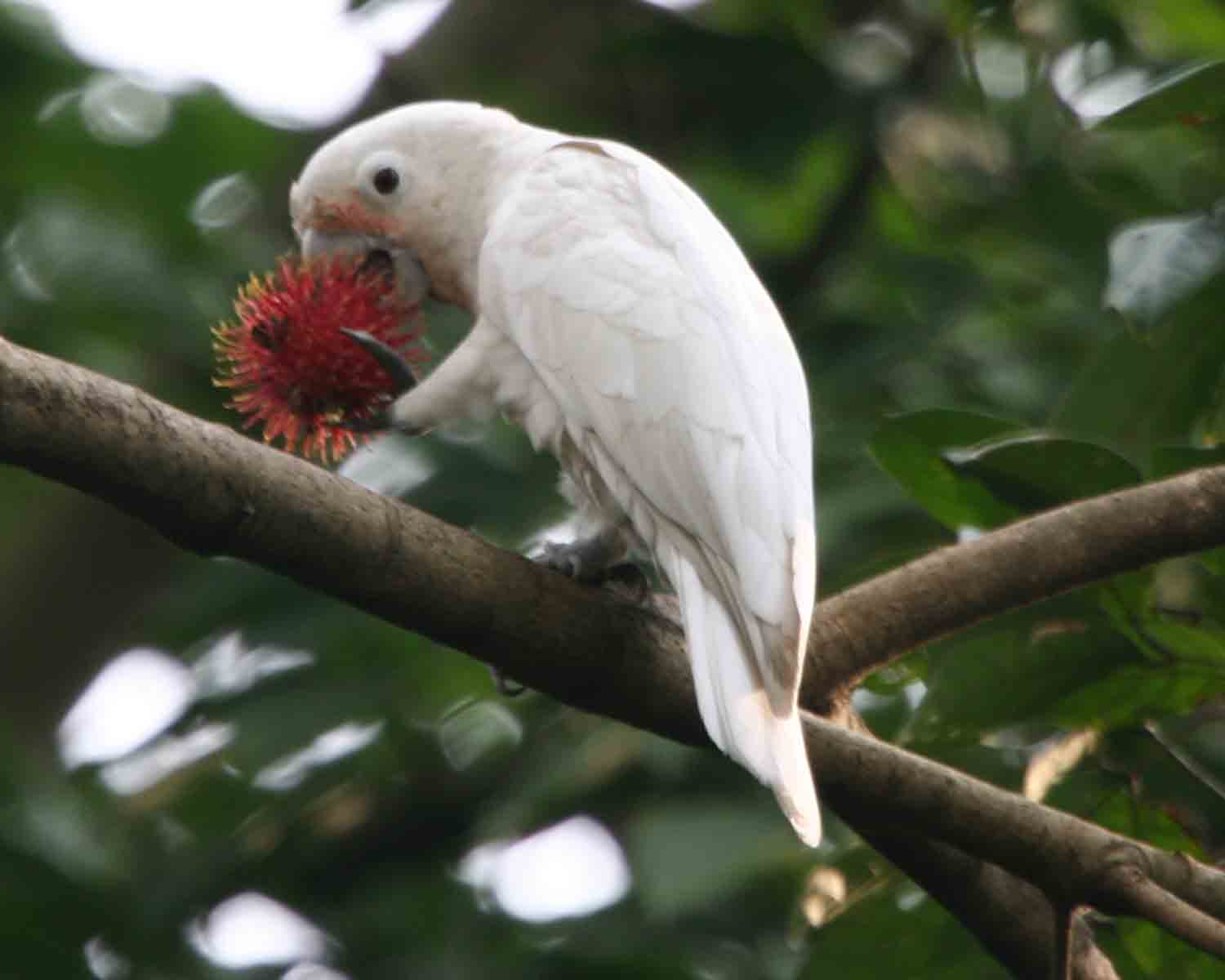
The Tanimbar corella is restricted to the islands of Tanimbar in Indonesia; a few feral escapees are found in Singapore.

Cockatoos have a much more restricted range than the true parrots, occurring naturally only in Australia, Indonesia, the Philippines, and some Pacific regions. Eleven of the 21 species exist in the wild only in Australia, while seven species occur only in the islands of the Philippines, Indonesia, Papua New Guinea and the Solomon Islands. No cockatoo species are found in Borneo, despite their presence on nearby Palawan and Sulawesi or many Pacific islands, although fossil remains have been recorded from New Caledonia.

Three species occur in both New Guinea and Australia. Some species have widespread distributions, with the galah, for example, occurring over most of Australia, whereas other species have tiny distributions, confined to a small part of the continent, such as the Baudin's black cockatoo of Western Australia or to a small island group, such as the Tanimbar corella, which is restricted to the Tanimbar Islands of Indonesia. Some cockatoos have been introduced accidentally to areas outside their natural range such as New Zealand, Singapore, and Palau, while two Australian corella species have been introduced to parts of the continent where they are not native.

Cockatoos occupy a wide range of habitats from forests in subalpine regions to mangroves. However, no species is found in all types of habitat. The most widespread species, such as the galah and cockatiel, are open-country specialists that feed on grass seeds. They are often highly mobile fast flyers and are nomadic. Flocks of birds move across large areas of the inland, locating and feeding on seed and other food sources. Drought may force flocks from more arid areas to move further into farming areas. Other cockatoo species, such as the glossy black cockatoo, inhabit woodlands, rainforests, shrublands and even alpine forests. The red-vented cockatoo inhabits mangroves and its absence from northern Luzon may be related to the lack of mangrove forests there. Forest-dwelling cockatoos are generally sedentary, as the food supply is more stable and predictable. Several species have adapted well to human modified habitats and are found in agricultural areas and even busy cities.

== Behaviour ==
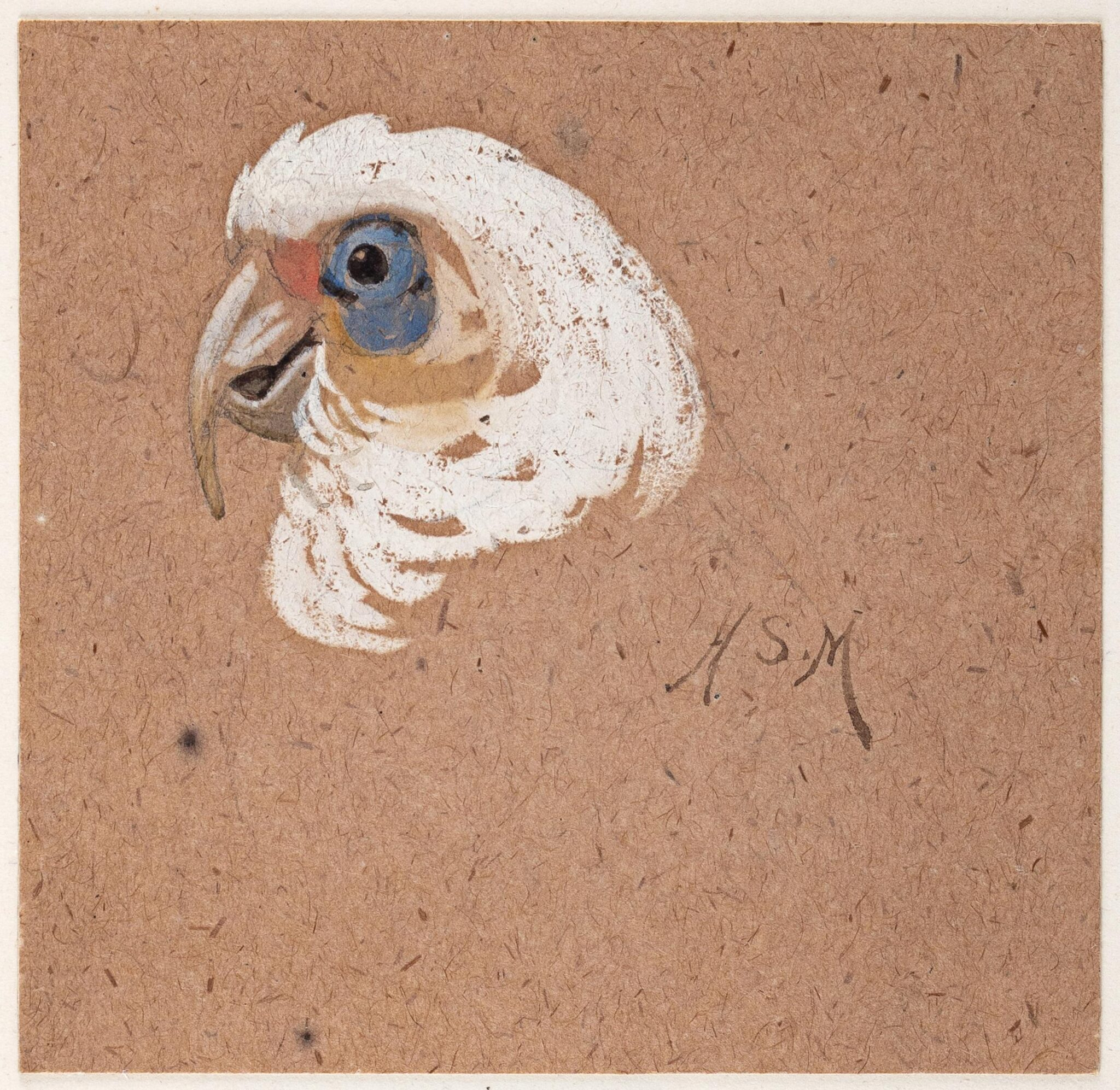
Watercolour and gouache sketch by Henry Stacy Marks

Cockatoos are diurnal and require daylight to find their food. They are not early risers, instead waiting until the sun has warmed their roosting sites before feeding. All species are generally highly social and roost, forage and travel in colourful and noisy flocks. These vary in size depending on availability of food; in times of plenty, flocks are small and number a hundred birds or less, while in droughts or other times of adversity, they may swell up to contain thousands or even tens of thousands of birds; one record from the Kimberley noted a flock of 32,000 little corellas. Species that inhabit open country form larger flocks than those of forested areas.

Some species require roosting sites that are located near drinking sites; other species travel great distances between the roosting and feeding sites. Cockatoos have several characteristic methods of bathing; they may hang upside down or fly about in the rain or flutter in wet leaves in the canopy. Cockatoos have a preferred "footedness" analogous to human handedness. Most species are left-footed with 87–100% of individuals using their left feet to eat, but a few species favor their right foot.

Researchers at Charles Sturt University in Australia have documented spontaneous, individually distinctive, dance-like movements in several cockatoo species. These sequences, which sometimes resemble courtship displays and can occur even without musical stimuli, may indicate complex social and cognitive abilities.

=== Breeding ===
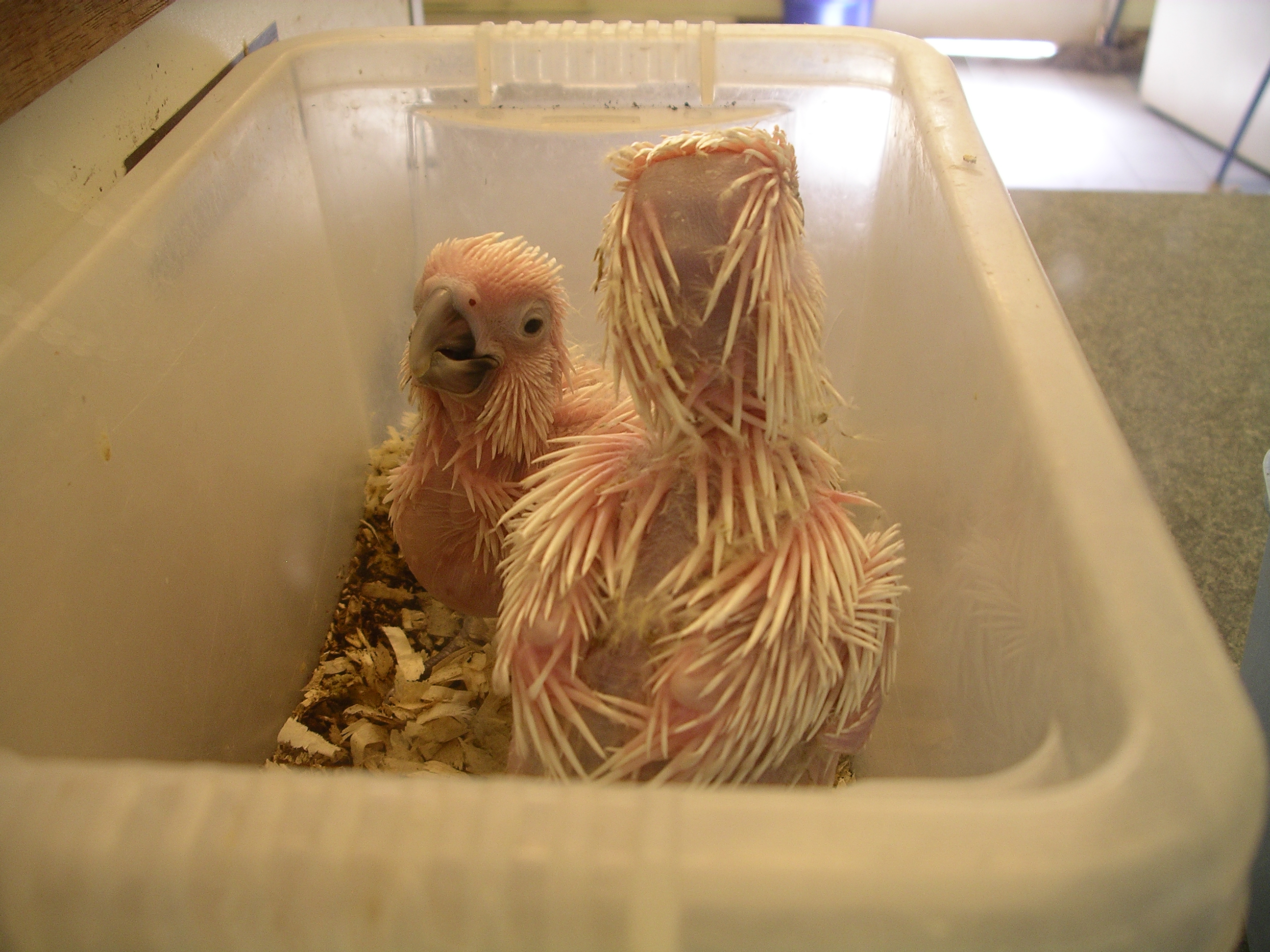
Hand-reared white cockatoo chicks bred for sale as pets

Cockatoos are monogamous breeders, with pair bonds that can last many years. Many birds pair up in flocks before they reach sexual maturity and delay breeding for a year at least. Females breed for the first time anywhere from three to seven years of age and males are often older. Sexual maturity is delayed so birds can develop the skills for raising and parenting young, which is prolonged compared with other birds; the young of some species remain with their parents for up to a year. Cockatoos may also display site fidelity, returning to the same nesting sites in consecutive years. Courtship is generally simple, particularly for established pairs, with the black cockatoos alone engaging in courtship feeding. Established pairs do engage in preening each other, but all forms of courtship drop off after incubation begins, possibly due to the strength of the pair-bond.

Like most parrots, the cockatoos are cavity nesters, nesting in holes in trees, which they are unable to excavate themselves. These hollows are formed from decay or destruction of wood by branches breaking off, fungi or insects such as termites or even woodpeckers where their ranges overlap. In many places these holes are scarce and the source of competition, both with other members of the same species and with other species and types of animal. In general, cockatoos choose hollows only a little larger than themselves, hence different-sized species nest in holes of corresponding (and different) sizes. If given the opportunity, cockatoos prefer nesting over 7 or 8 metres (23 or 26 ft) above the ground and close to water and food.

The nesting hollows are lined with sticks, wood chips and branches with leaves. The eggs of cockatoos are oval and initially white, as their location makes camouflage unnecessary. However, they do become discoloured over the course of incubation. They range in size from 55 mm × 37 mm (2.2 in × 1.5 in) in the palm and red-tailed black cockatoos, to 26 mm × 19 mm (1.02 in × 0.75 in) in the cockatiel. Clutch size varies within the family, with the palm cockatoo and some other larger cockatoos laying only a single egg and the smaller species laying anywhere between two and eight eggs. Food supply also plays a role in clutch size. Some species can lay a second clutch if the first fails. Around 20% of eggs laid are infertile. The cockatoos' incubation and brooding responsibilities may either be undertaken by the female alone in the case of the black cockatoos or shared amongst the sexes as happens in the other species. In the case of the black cockatoos, the female is provisioned by the male several times a day. The young of all species are born covered in yellowish down, bar the palm cockatoo, whose young are born naked. Cockatoo incubation times are dependent on species size, with the smaller cockatiels having a period of around 20 days and the larger Carnaby's black cockatoo incubating its eggs for up to 29 days.

The nestling period also varies by species size, with larger species having longer nestling periods. It is also affected by season and environmental factors and by competition with siblings in species with clutch sizes greater than one. Much of what is known about the nestling period of some species is dependent on aviary studies—aviary cockatiels can fledge after 5 weeks and the large palm cockatoos after 11 weeks. During this period, the young become covered in juvenile plumage while remaining in the hollow. Wings and tail feathers are slow to grow initially but more rapid as the primary feathers appear. Nestlings quickly reach about 80–90% of adult weight about two-thirds of the time through this period, plateauing before they leave the hollow; they fledge at this weight with wing and tail feathers still to grow a little before reaching adult dimensions. Growth rate of the young, as well as numbers fledged, are adversely impacted by reduced food supply and poor weather conditions.

=== Diet and feeding ===
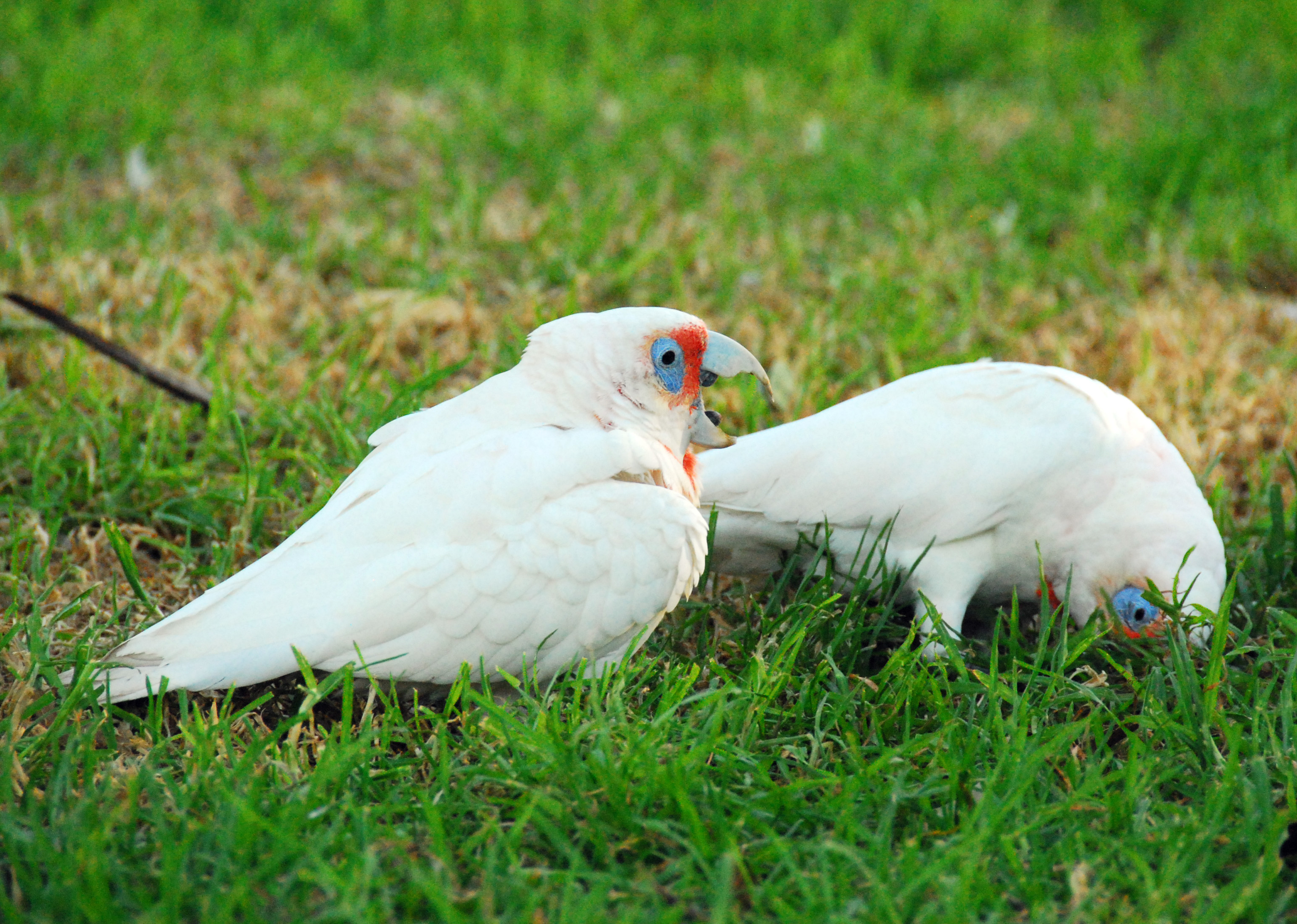
Wild long-billed corellas in Perth. The bird on the right is using its long beak to dig for food in short grass.

Cockatoos are versatile feeders and consume a range of mainly vegetable food items. Seeds form a large part of the diet of all species; these are opened with their large and powerful bills. The galahs, corellas and some of the black cockatoos feed primarily on the ground; others feed mostly in trees. The ground-feeding species tend to forage in flocks, which form tight, squabbling groups where seeds are concentrated and dispersed lines where food is more sparsely distributed; they also prefer open areas where visibility is good. The western and long-billed corellas have elongated bills to excavate tubers and roots and the pink cockatoo walks in a circle around the doublegee (Emex australis) to twist out and remove the underground parts.

Many species forage for food in the canopy of trees, taking advantage of serotiny (the storage of a large supply of seed in cones or gumnuts by plant genera such as Eucalyptus, Banksia and Hakea), a natural feature of the Australian landscape in dryer regions. These woody fruiting bodies are inaccessible to many species and harvested in the main by parrots, cockatoos and rodents in more tropical regions. The larger cones can be opened by the large bills of cockatoos but are too strong for smaller animals. Many nuts and fruits lie on the end of small branches which are unable to support the weight of the foraging cockatoo, which instead bends the branch towards itself and holds it with its foot.

While some cockatoos are generalists taking a wide range of foods, others are specialists. The glossy black cockatoo specialises in the cones of trees of the genus Allocasuarina, preferring a single species, A. verticillata. It holds the cones in its foot and shreds them with its powerful bill before removing the seeds with its tongue. Some species take large numbers of insects, particularly when breeding; in fact the bulk of the yellow-tailed black cockatoo's diet is made up of insects. The large bill is used in order to extract grubs and larvae from rotting wood. The amount of time cockatoos have to spend foraging varies with the season. During times of plenty they may need to feed for only a few hours in the day, in the morning and evening, then spend the rest of the day roosting or preening in trees, but during the winter most of the day may be spent foraging. The birds have increased nutritional requirements during the breeding season, so they spend more time foraging for food during this time. Cockatoos have large crops, which allow them to store and digest food for some time after retiring to a tree.

=== Predators and threats ===
The peregrine falcon and little eagle have been reported taking galahs and the wedge-tailed eagle has been observed killing a sulphur-crested cockatoo. Eggs and nestlings are vulnerable to many hazards. Various species of monitor lizard (Varanus) are able to climb trees and enter hollows. Other predators recorded include the spotted wood owl on Rasa Island in the Philippines; the Australian scrub python, black butcherbird and rodents including the giant white-tailed rat in Cape York; and brushtail possum on Kangaroo Island. Furthermore, galahs and little corellas competing for nesting space with the glossy black cockatoo on Kangaroo Island have been recorded killing nestlings of the latter species there. Severe storms may also flood hollows drowning the young and termite or borer activity may lead to the internal collapse of nests.

Like other parrots, cockatoos can be afflicted by psittacine beak and feather disease (PBFD). The viral infection causes feather loss and beak malformation and reduces the bird's overall immunity. Particularly prevalent in sulphur-crested cockatoos, little corellas and galahs, it has been recorded in 14 species of cockatoo to date. Although unlikely to significantly impact on large, healthy populations of birds in the wild, PBFD may pose a high risk to smaller stressed populations.

A white cockatoo and a sulphur-crested cockatoo were found to be infected with the protozoon Haemoproteus and another sulphur-crested cockatoo had the malaria parasite Plasmodium on analysis of faecal samples at Almuñecar ornithological garden in Granada in Spain. Like amazon parrots and macaws, cockatoos frequently develop cloacal papillomas. The relationship with malignancy is unknown, as is the cause, although a parrot papilloma virus has been isolated from a grey parrot with the condition.

=== Social learning ===
Cockatoos have been shown to learn new skills through social interaction. In New South Wales, researchers and citizen scientists were able to track the spread of lid-flipping skills as cockatoos learned from each other to open garbage bins. Bin-opening spread more quickly to neighbouring suburbs than suburbs further away. In addition, birds in different areas developed their own variants for accomplishing the complex task.

== Relationship with humans ==
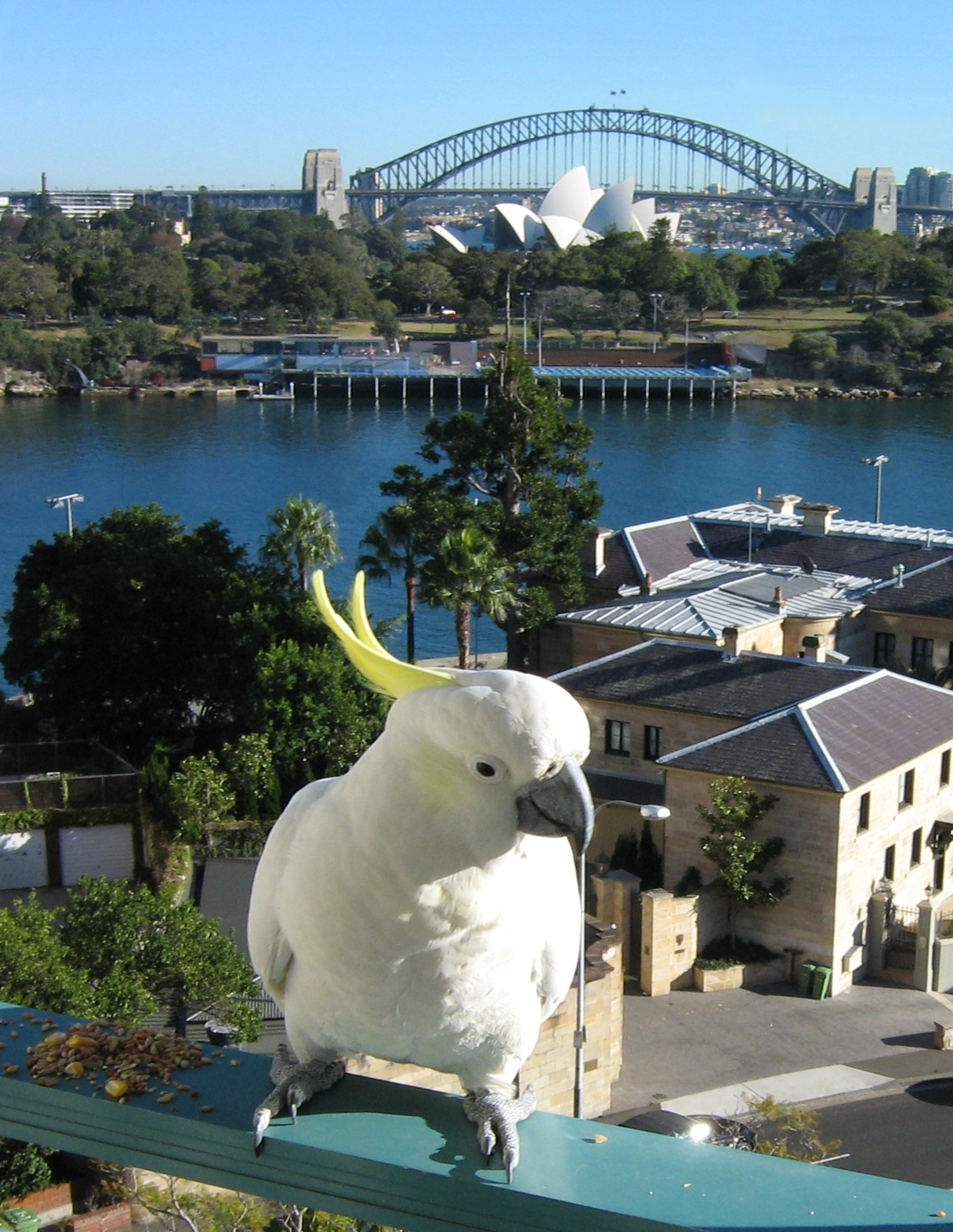
A sulphur-crested cockatoo visiting a balcony in eastern Sydney for bird seeds

Cockatoos were known in Europe from at least the 13th century and probably came by ship from the islands to the north of Australia.

Human activities have had positive effects on some species of cockatoo and negative effects on others. Many species of open country have benefited greatly from anthropogenic changes to the landscape, with the great increase in reliable seed food sources, and available water contributing to their survival, as well as their adaption to a diet including foreign foodstuffs. This benefit appears to be restricted to Australian species, as cockatoos favouring open country outside Australia have not become more abundant. Predominantly forest-dwelling species have suffered greatly from habitat destruction; in the main, they appear to have a more specialised diet and have not been able to incorporate exotic food into their diet. A notable exception is the yellow-tailed black cockatoo in eastern Australia.

=== Pests ===
Several species of cockatoo can be serious agricultural pests. They are sometimes controlled by shooting, poisoning or capture followed by gassing. Non-lethal damage mitigation methods used include scaring, habitat manipulation and the provision of decoy food dumps or sacrifice crops to distract them from the main crop. They can be a nuisance in urban areas due to destruction of property. They maintain their bills in the wild by chewing on wood, but in suburbia, they may chew outdoor furniture, door and window frames; soft decorative timbers such as western redcedar are readily demolished. Birds may also target external wiring and fixtures such as solar water heaters, television antennae and satellite dishes. A business in central Melbourne suffered as sulphur-crested cockatoos repeatedly stripped the silicone sealant from the plate glass windows. Galahs and red-tailed black cockatoos have stripped electrical cabling in rural areas and tarpaulin is targeted elsewhere. Outside Australia, the Tanimbar corella is a pest on Yamdena Island where it raids maize crops.

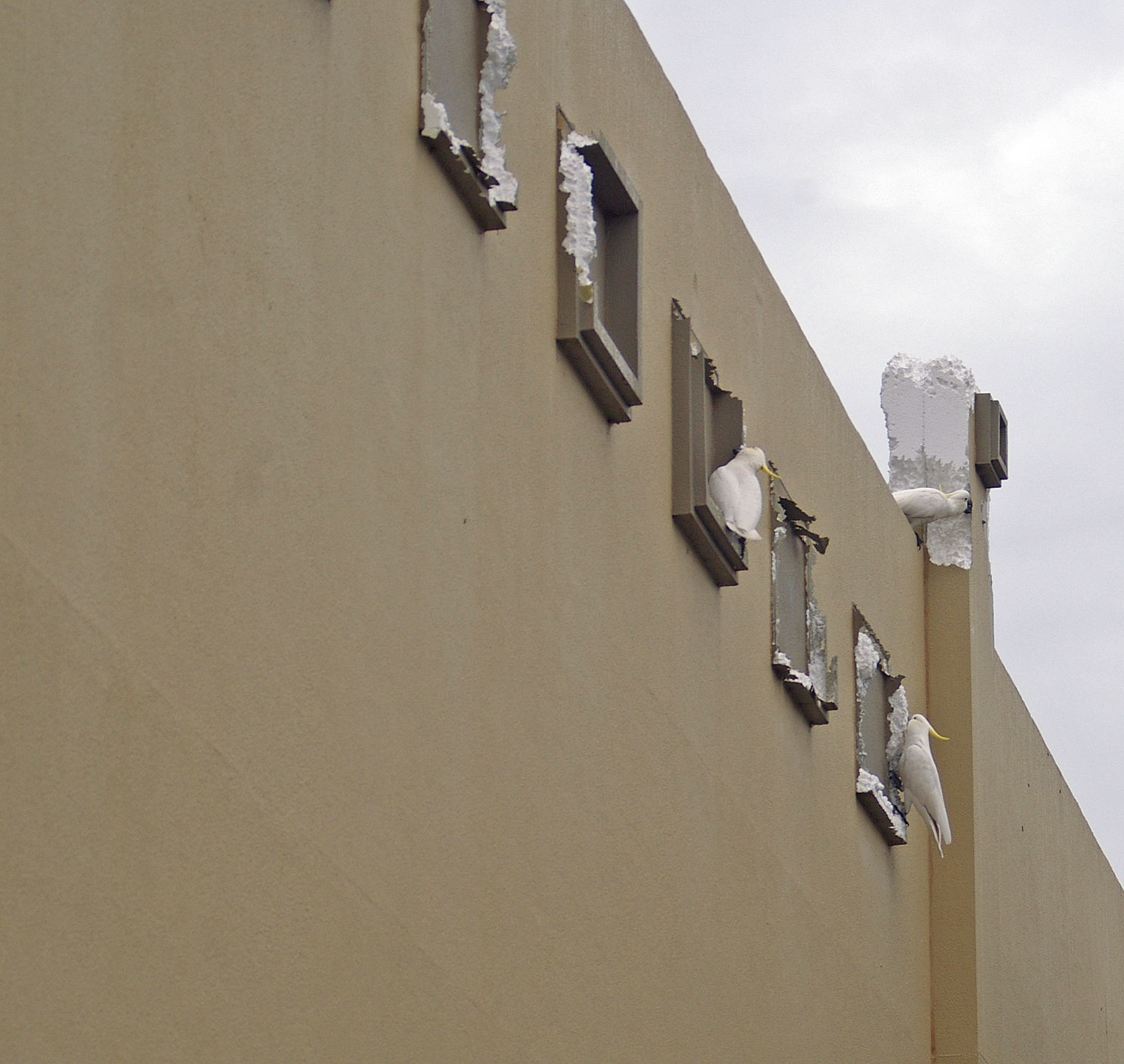
Sulphur-crested cockatoos damaging the Sturt Mall shopping centre facade, made of polystyrene

In 1995 the Government of the state of Victoria published a report on problems caused by long-billed corellas, sulphur-crested cockatoos and galahs, three species which, along with the little corella, have large and growing populations, having benefited from anthropogenic changes to the landscape. Subsequent to the findings and publication of the report, these three species were declared unprotected by a Governor in Council Order under certain conditions and are allowed to be killed where serious damage is being caused by them to trees, vineyards, orchards, recreational reserves and commercial crops. Damage covered by the report included not only that to cereal crops, fruit and nut orchards and some kinds of vegetable crops but also to houses and communications equipment. The little corella is a declared pest of agriculture in Western Australia, where it is an aviculturally introduced species. The birds damage sorghum, maize, sunflower, chickpeas and other crops. They also defoliate amenity trees in parks and gardens, dig for edible roots and corms on sports grounds and race tracks, as well as chew wiring and household fittings. In South Australia, where flocks can number several thousand birds and the species is listed as unprotected, they are accused of defoliating red gums and other native or ornamental trees used for roosting, damaging tarpaulins on grain bunkers, wiring and flashing on buildings, taking grain from newly seeded paddocks and creating a noise nuisance.

Several rare species and subspecies, too, have been recorded as causing problems. The Carnaby's black cockatoo, a threatened Western Australian endemic, has been considered a pest in pine plantations where the birds chew off the leading shoots of growing pine trees, resulting in bent trunks and reduced timber value. They are also known to damage nut and fruit crops, and have learnt to exploit canola crops. The Baudin's black cockatoo, also endemic to the south-west of Western Australia, can be a pest in apple and pear orchards where it destroys the fruit to extract the seeds. Muir's corella, the nominate subspecies of the western corella, is also a declared pest of agriculture in Western Australia, as well as being nationally vulnerable and listed under state legislation as being "rare or likely to become extinct".

=== Status and conservation ===
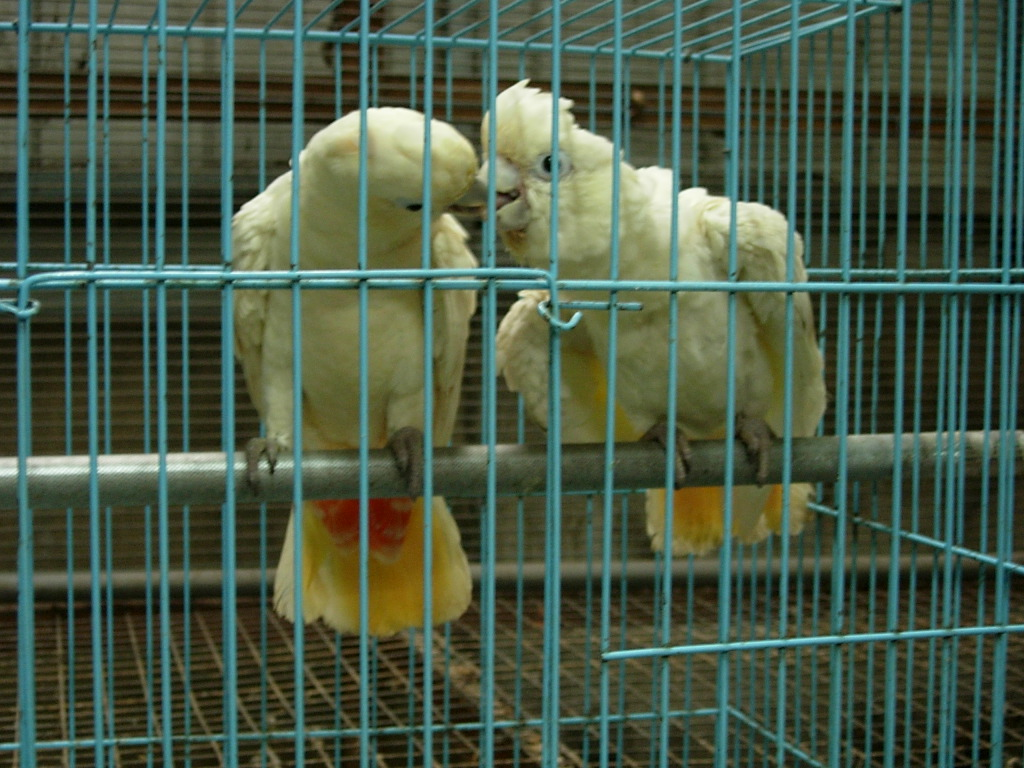
The red-vented cockatoo is a critically endangered species endemic to the Philippines.

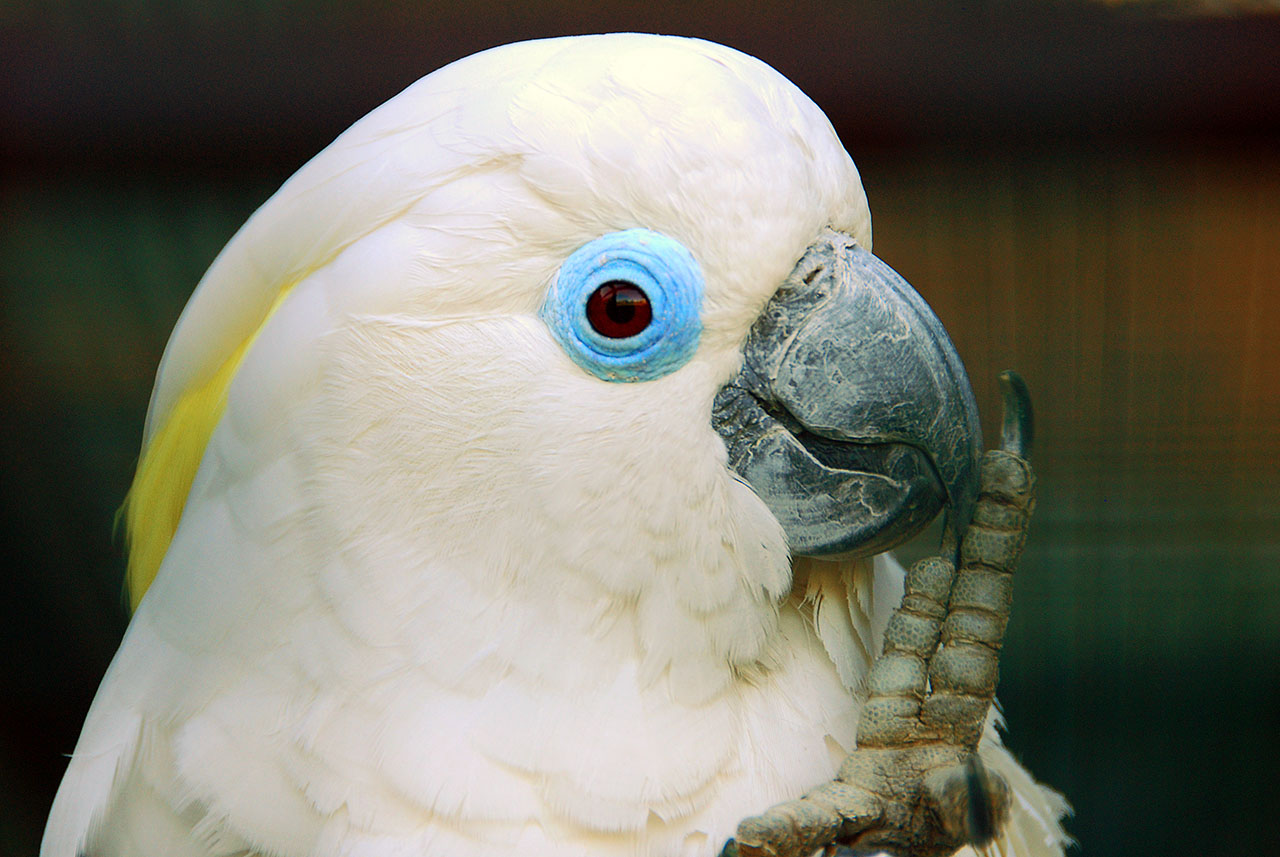
The blue-eyed cockatoo is a vulnerable species endemic to New Britain.

According to the IUCN and BirdLife International, seven species of cockatoo are considered to be vulnerable or worse and one is considered to be near-threatened. Of these, two species—the red-vented cockatoo and the yellow-crested cockatoo—are considered to be critically endangered.

The principal threats to cockatoos are habitat loss and the wildlife trade. All cockatoos are dependent on trees for nesting and are vulnerable to their loss; in addition many species have specialised habitat requirements or live on small islands and have naturally small ranges, making them vulnerable to the loss of these habitats. Cockatoos are popular as pets and the capture and trade has threatened some species; between 1983 and 1990, 66,654 recorded salmon-crested cockatoos were exported from Indonesia, a figure that does not include the number of birds caught for the domestic trade or that were exported illegally. The capture of many species has subsequently been banned but the trade continues illegally. Birds are put in crates or bamboo tubing and conveyed on boats out of Indonesia and the Philippines. Not only are the rare species smuggled out of Indonesia but also common and rare cockatoos alike are smuggled out of Australia; birds are sedated, covered in nylon stockings and packed into PVC tubing which is then placed in unaccompanied luggage on international flights. Mortality is significant (30%) and eggs, more easily hidden on the bodies of smugglers on flights, are increasingly smuggled instead. Trafficking is thought to be run by organised gangs, who also trade Australian species for overseas species such as macaws coming the other way.

All species of cockatoo except the cockatiel are protected by the Convention on International Trade in Endangered Species of Wild Fauna and Flora (CITES), which restricts import and export of wild-caught parrots to special licensed purposes. Five cockatoo species (including all subspecies)—the Tanimbar corella (Cacatua goffiniana), red-vented cockatoo (Cacatua haematuropygia), Moluccan cockatoo (Cacatua moluccensis), yellow-crested cockatoo (Cacatua sulphurea) and palm cockatoo (Probosciger aterrimus)—are protected on the CITES Appendix I list. With the exception of the cockatiel, all remaining cockatoo species are protected on the CITES Appendix II list.

=== Aviculture ===
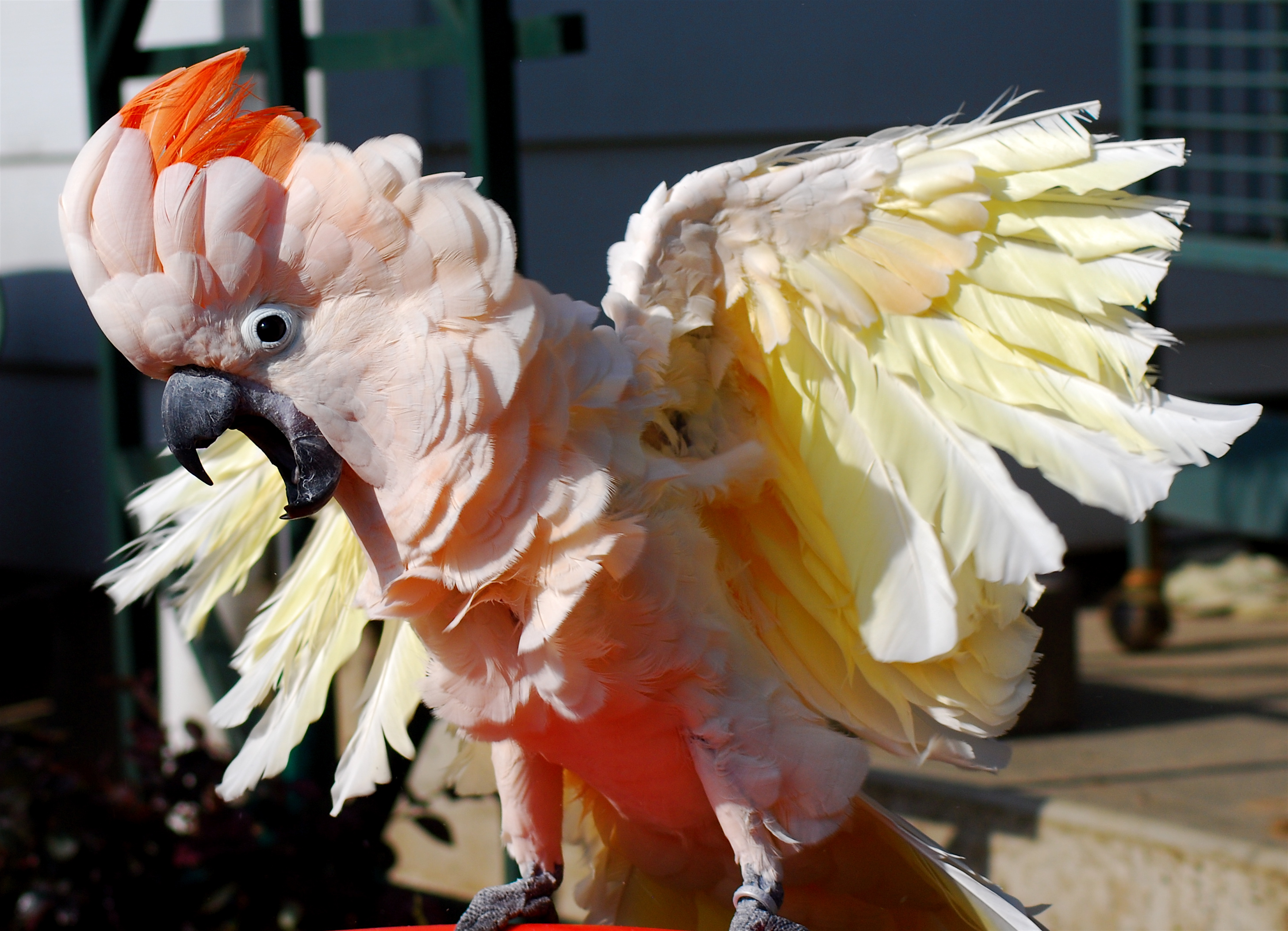
A wing-clipped pet. Salmon-crested cockatoos, also known as Moluccan cockatoos, are the largest white-coloured cockatoo species at about 52 cm (20 in) long and weighing 775–935 g (27.3–33.0 oz). Cockatoos can be noisy and demanding pets.

Kept for their appearance, intelligence, and engaging personalities, cockatoos can nonetheless be problematic pets or companion parrots. Generally, they are not good at mimicking human speech, although the little corella is a renowned talker. As social animals, wild cockatoos have been known to learn human speech from ex-captive birds that have integrated into a flock. Their care is best provided by those experienced in keeping parrots. Cockatoos are social animals and their social needs are difficult to cater for, and they can suffer if kept in a cage on their own for long periods of time.

The cockatiel is by far the cockatoo species most frequently kept in captivity. Among U.S. bird keepers that participated in a survey by APPMA in 2003/04, 39% had cockatiels, as opposed to only 3% that had (other) cockatoo species. The white cockatoos are more often encountered in aviculture than the black cockatoos. Black cockatoos are rarely seen in European zoos due to export restrictions on Australian wildlife but birds seized by governments have been loaned.

Cockatoos are often very affectionate with their owner and at times other people but can demand a great deal of attention. It has been suggested that cockatoos' need for physical attention from humans may stem from suboptimal rearing techniques—young birds being removed from parental care for hand-rearing too early in the belief that this will produce a more suitable pet, leading the bird to seek out physical contact from humans as a parent substitute. Furthermore, their intense curiosity means they must be given a steady supply of objects to tinker with, chew, dismantle and destroy. Parrots in captivity may suffer from boredom, which can lead to stereotypic behaviour patterns, such as feather-plucking. Feather plucking is likely to stem from psychological rather than physical causes. Other major drawbacks include their painful bites, and their piercing screeches. The salmon-crested and white cockatoo species are particular offenders. All cockatoos have a fine powder on their feathers, which may induce allergies in certain people. In general, the smaller cockatoo species such as Goffin's and quieter Galah's cockatoos are much easier to keep as pets. The cockatiel is one of the most popular and easiest parrots to keep as a pet, and many colour mutations are available in aviculture.

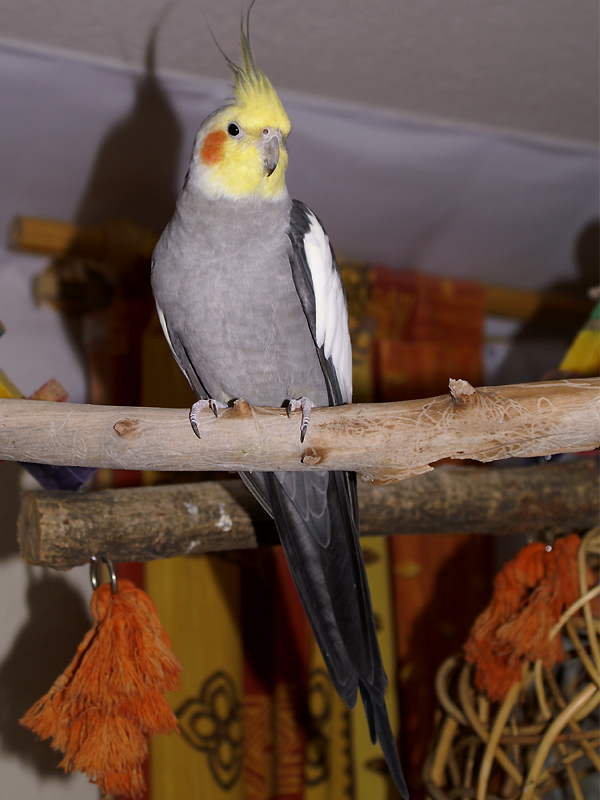
A pet cockatiel. This parrot is about 32 cm (13 in) long and is by far the smallest and lightest cockatoo.

Larger cockatoos can live 30 to 70 years depending on the species, or occasionally longer, and cockatiels can live for about 20 years. As pets they require a long-term commitment from their owners. Their longevity is considered a positive trait as it reduces instances of the loss of a pet. The oldest cockatoo in captivity was a pink cockatoo named Cookie, residing at Brookfield Zoo in Chicago, which lived to be 83 years old (1933–2016). A salmon-crested cockatoo named King Tut who resided at the San Diego Zoo was nearly 69 when he died in 1990 and a palm cockatoo reached 56 in London Zoo in 2000. However, anecdotal reports describe birds of much greater ages. Cocky Bennett of Tom Ugly's Point in Sydney was a celebrated sulphur-crested cockatoo who was reported to have reached an age of 100 years or more. He had lost his feathers and was naked for much of his life. A palm cockatoo was reported to have reached 80 or 90 years of age in an Australian zoo, and a little corella that was removed from a nest in central Australia in 1904 was reported still alive in the late 1970s. In February 2010, a white cockatoo named Arthur was claimed to be 90 years old; he had lived with a family for generations in Dalaguete, Cebu, before being taken to Cebu City Zoo.

Trained cockatoos are sometimes seen in bird shows in zoos. They are generally less motivated by food than other birds; some may respond more to petting or praise than food. Cockatoos can often be taught to wear a parrot harness, enabling their owners to take them outdoors. Cockatoos have been used in animal-assisted therapy, generally in nursing homes.

Cockatoos often have pronounced responses to musical sounds and numerous videos exist showing the birds dancing to popular music. Research conducted in 2008 with an Eleonora cockatoo named Snowball had indicated that this particular individual is indeed capable of beat induction—perceiving human-created music and synchronizing his body movements to the beat.

=== Culture ===
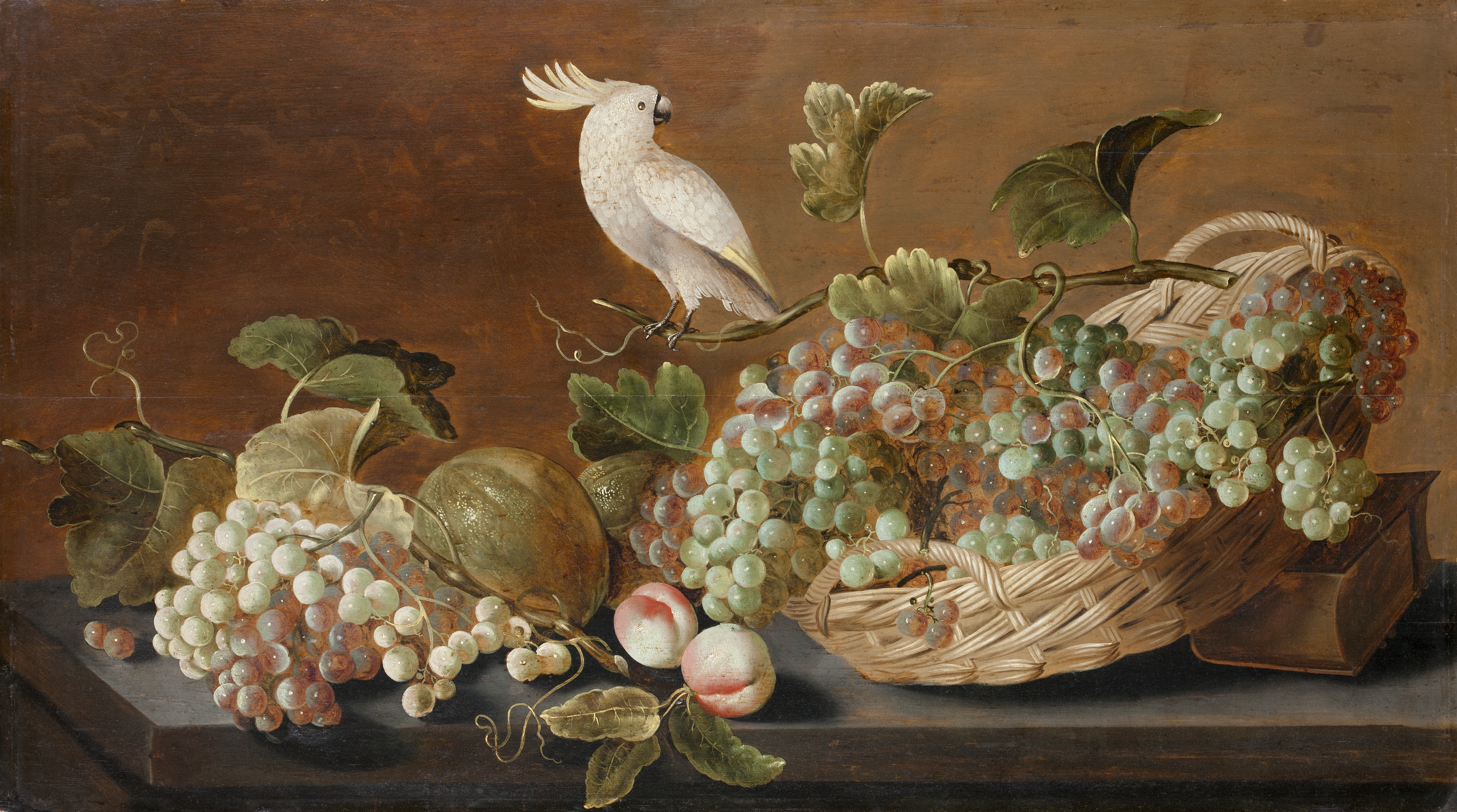
Dutch still life with cockatoo, circa 1640

The earliest European depiction of a cockatoo is in the falconry book De arte venandi cum avibus, written by Frederick II, Holy Roman Emperor. The next European depiction of a cockatoo, previously thought to be the earliest, is present in the 1496 painting by Andrea Mantegna titled Madonna della Vittoria. Later examples were painted by Hungarian artist Jakob Bogdani (1660–1724), who resided in Amsterdam from 1683 and then England, and appeared with numerous other birds in the bird pieces of the Dutch painter Melchior d'Hondecoeter (1636–1695). A cockatoo is the unlucky subject in An Experiment on a Bird in the Air Pump by English artist Joseph Wright of Derby, its fate unclear in the painting. Cockatoos were among the many Australian plants and animals which featured in decorative motifs in Federation architecture of the early 20th century. A visit to a Camden Town pet shop in 1958 inspired English painter William Roberts to paint The Cockatoos, in the collection of the Tate Gallery. American artist and sculptor Joseph Cornell was known for placing cutout paper cockatoos in his works.

The government of the Australian Capital Territory adopted the gang-gang cockatoo as its official faunal emblem on 27 February 1997. The short-lived budget airline Impulse Airlines featured a sulphur-crested cockatoo on its corporate livery (and aeroplanes). The palm cockatoo, which has a unique beak and face colouration, is used as a symbol by the World Parrot Trust.

Two 1970s police dramas featured protagonists with pet cockatoos. In the 1973 film Serpico, Al Pacino's character had a pet white cockatoo and the television show Baretta saw Robert Blake's character with Fred the Triton cockatoo. The popularity of the latter show saw a corresponding rise in popularity of cockatoos as pets in the late 1970s. Cockatoos have been used frequently in advertising; a cockatoo appeared in a 'cheeky' (and later toned-down) 2008 advertising campaign for Cockatoo Ridge Wineries.

The song burung kakatua composed by R.C. Hardjosubroto is a popular children song in Indonesia. Orkes Irama was released the song in Mari Bersuka Ria dengan Irama Lenso album in 1965.

=== Intelligence ===
A team of scientists from Oxford University, the University of Vienna and the Max Planck Institute conducted tests on ten untrained Tanimbar corellas (Cacatua goffiniana), and found that they were able to solve complex mechanical puzzles.
