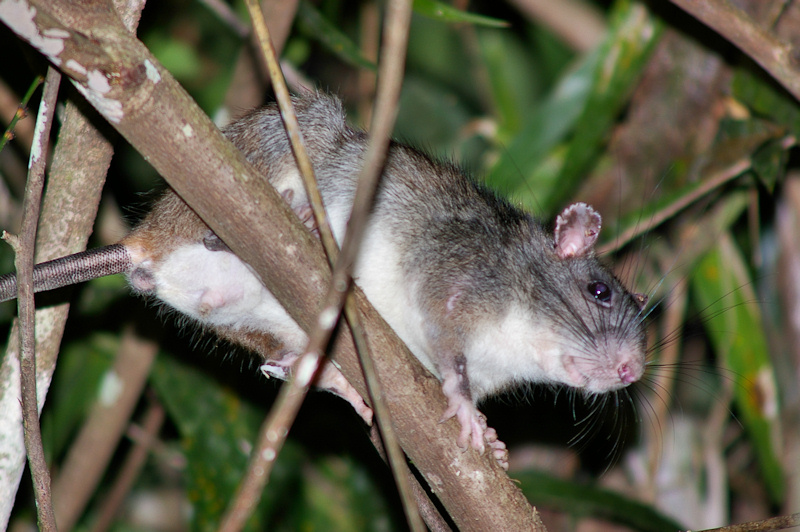
- Uromys caudimaculatus

Scientific classification
- Kingdom: Animalia
- Phylum: Chordata
- Class: Mammalia
- Order: Rodentia
- Family: Muridae
- Tribe: Hydromyini
- Genus: Uromys; Peters, 1867

Type species
- Mus macropus

Species
- 11, see below

= Uromys =

Genus of rodents

Uromys is a genus of rodents found in Melanesia and Australia. They are known as the giant naked-tailed rats. There are eleven species in the genus, with the most recent described in 2017.

== Species ==
- Giant naked-tailed rat, Uromys anak Thomas, 1907
- Biak giant rat, Uromys boeadii Groves & Flannery, 1994
- Giant white-tailed rat, Uromys caudimaculatus Krefft, 1867
- Emma's giant rat, Uromys emmae Groves & Flannery, 1994
- Masked white-tailed rat, Uromys hadrourus Winter, 1983
- Emperor rat, Uromys imperator Thomas, 1888
- Bismarck giant rat, Uromys neobritannicus Tate & Archbold, 1935
- Guadalcanal rat, Uromys porculus Thomas, 1904
- King rat, Uromys rex Thomas, 1888
- Great Key Island giant rat, Uromys siebersi Thomas, 1923
- Vangunu giant rat, Uromys vika Lavery & Judge, 2017
