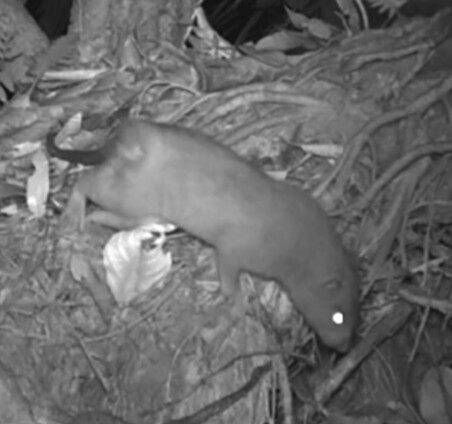

Conservation status
- Critically Endangered (IUCN 3.1)

Scientific classification
- Kingdom: Animalia
- Phylum: Chordata
- Class: Mammalia
- Infraclass: Placentalia
- Order: Rodentia
- Family: Muridae
- Genus: Uromys
- Species: U. vika

Binomial name
- Uromys vika Lavery & Judge, 2017

= Vangunu giant rat =

Species of rodent

The Vangunu giant rat (Uromys vika), locally known as the vika, is a giant arboreal species of rodent in the family Muridae. The rat was discovered in the island of Vangunu in the Solomon Islands in 2015, after years of searching based on local stories, and described in 2017. It was identified as a new species on the basis of its skull, skeleton and a detailed DNA analysis. The single individual initially collected from a felled tree (Dillenia salomonensis) measured 46 cm (18 in) long, weighed between 0.5 and 1.0 kg (1.1 and 2.2 lb) and had orange-brown fur. Its diet is believed to include thick-shelled nuts like ngali nuts and coconuts, and probably fruits. The species is likely to be designated critically endangered, due to the small amount of forest habitat (about 80 km^{2} (31 sq mi)) remaining on the island and ongoing logging. In 2021, the species was observed in the wild for the first time, with at least four individuals being observed via camera trap in Vangunu's last remaining lowland primary forest. They are highly threatened by proposed logging plans for their remaining habitat.
