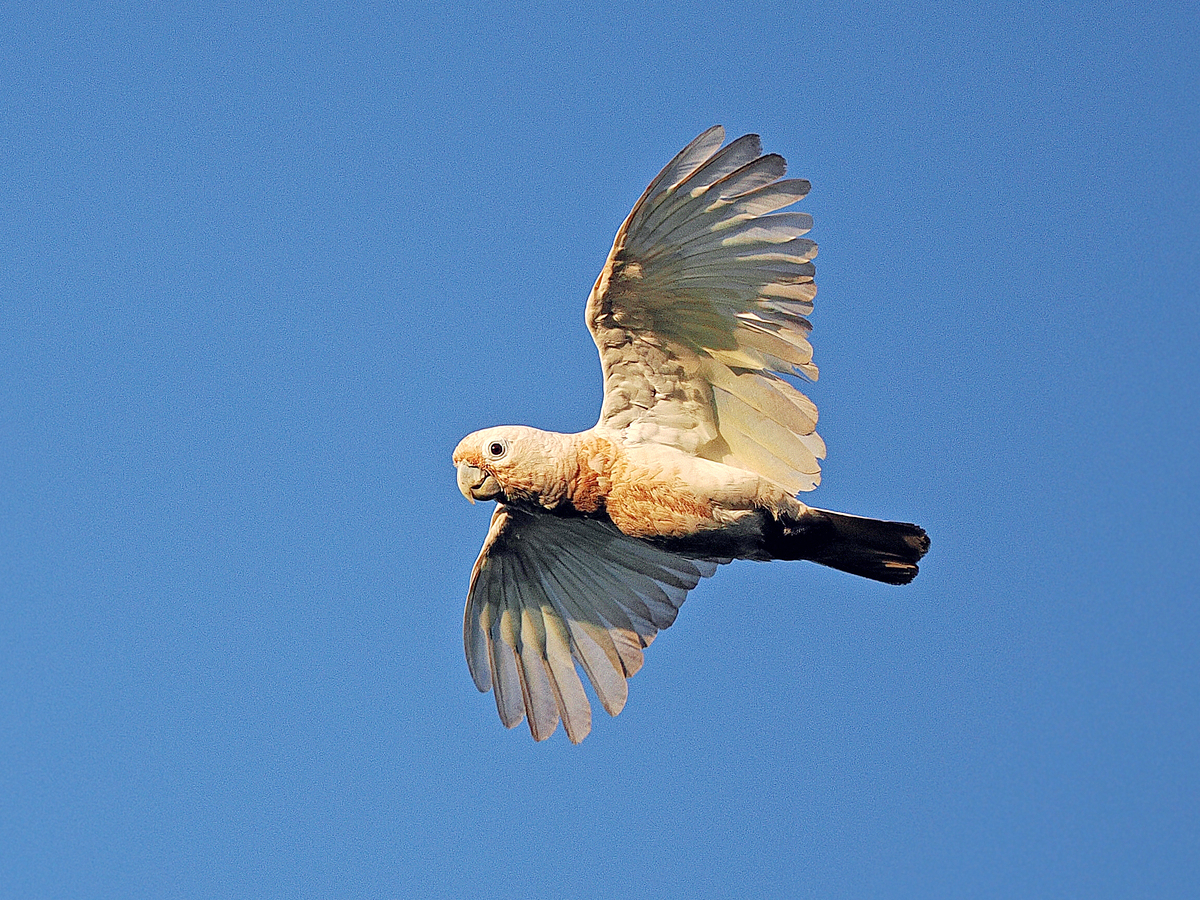
- Tanimbar corella on Yamdena, Tanimbar, Indonesia

Conservation status
- Near Threatened (IUCN 3.1)
- CITES Appendix I

Scientific classification
- Kingdom: Animalia
- Phylum: Chordata
- Class: Aves
- Order: Psittaciformes
- Family: Cacatuidae
- Genus: Cacatua
- Subgenus: Licmetis
- Species: C. goffiniana

Binomial name
- Cacatua goffiniana Roselaar & Michels, 2004

= Tanimbar corella =

Species of bird

The Tanimbar corella (Cacatua goffiniana), also known as Goffin's cockatoo or Tanimbar cockatoo, is a species of cockatoo endemic to forests of Yamdena, Larat, and Selaru, all islands in the Tanimbar Islands archipelago in Indonesia. It has been introduced to the Kai Islands, Indonesia; Puerto Rico; and Singapore. This species was only formally described in 2004, after it was discovered that the previous formal descriptions pertained to individuals of a different cockatoo species, Ducorps' or Solomons cockatoo (Cacatua ducorpsii). Tanimbar corellas are the smallest of the white cockatoos. It is classified as near threatened due to deforestation and cage-bird trade. It breeds well in captivity and a large avicultural population exists.

== Description ==
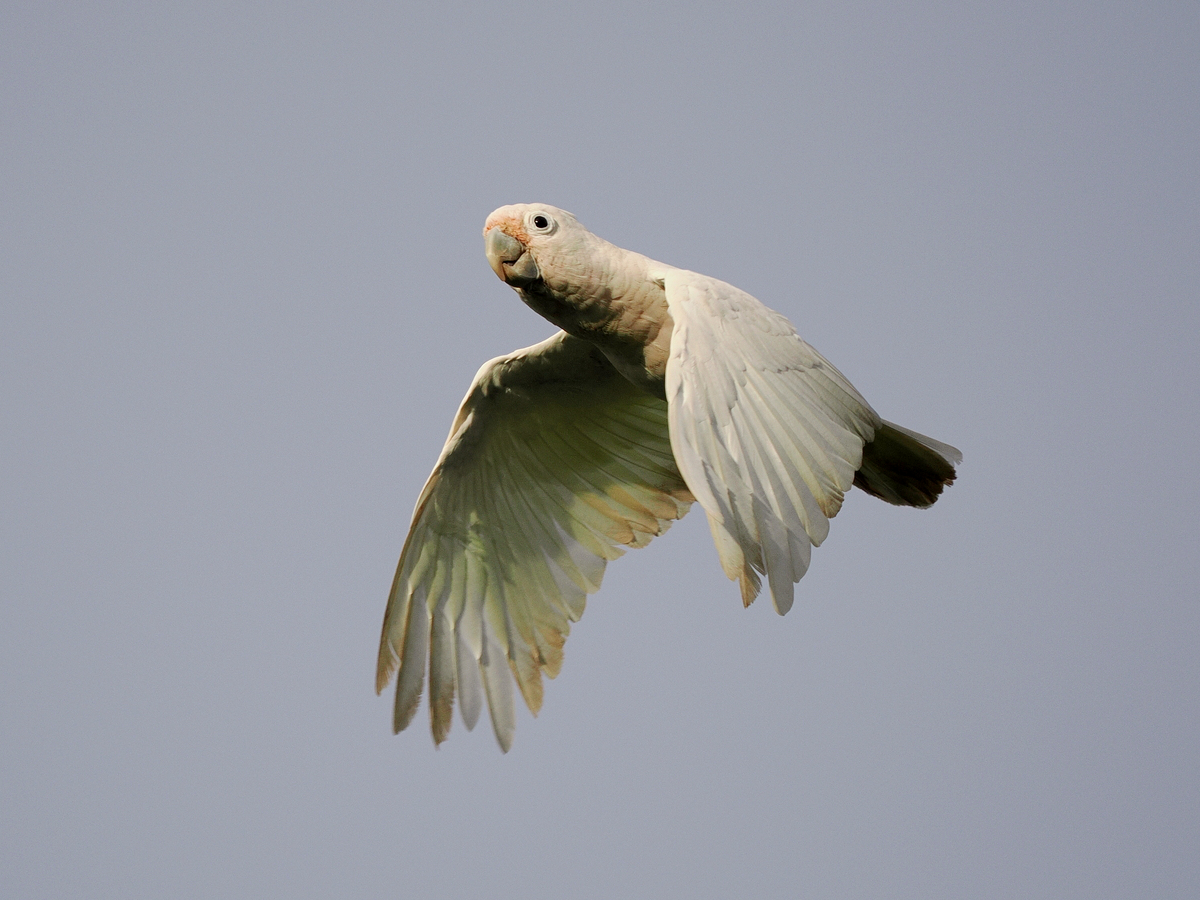
In flight, Yamdena, Tanimbar, Indonesia

Tanimbar corellas weigh, on average, about 250 g (9 oz) for females and 300 g (11 oz) for males. They are about 31 cm (12 in) from head to tail.

Like all members of the family Cacatuidae, the Tanimbar corella is crested, meaning it has a collection of feathers on its head that it can raise or lower. Its body is mainly covered with white feathers, with salmon- or pink-coloured feathers between the beak and eyes. The deeper (proximal) parts of the crest feathers and neck feathers are also a salmon colour, but the coloration here is hidden by the white colour of the more superficial (distal) areas of these feathers. The underside of its wing and tail feathers exhibit a yellowish tinge. The beak is pale grey and the eye colour is brown in females and black in males. The males are slightly larger, but otherwise look similar to the females.

In captivity, Tanimbar corellas live up to 30 years, making them one of the shorter-lived cockatoo species.

== Breeding ==
Not much is known about the breeding behaviour of this species in the wild. Their breeding season is unknown and little is known of their mating behaviour. Two or three eggs are laid per clutch.

Virtually all knowledge of this species' breeding habits comes from captive-bred populations. Aviculturists in the United Kingdom have reported that the Tanimbar corella breeds from late spring, with the eggs hatching before July after an incubation period around 28 days, the nest being attended to by both parents. The female feeds her offspring for roughly three weeks after fledging. No courtship behaviour was observed between cock and hen prior to mating.

== Conservation ==
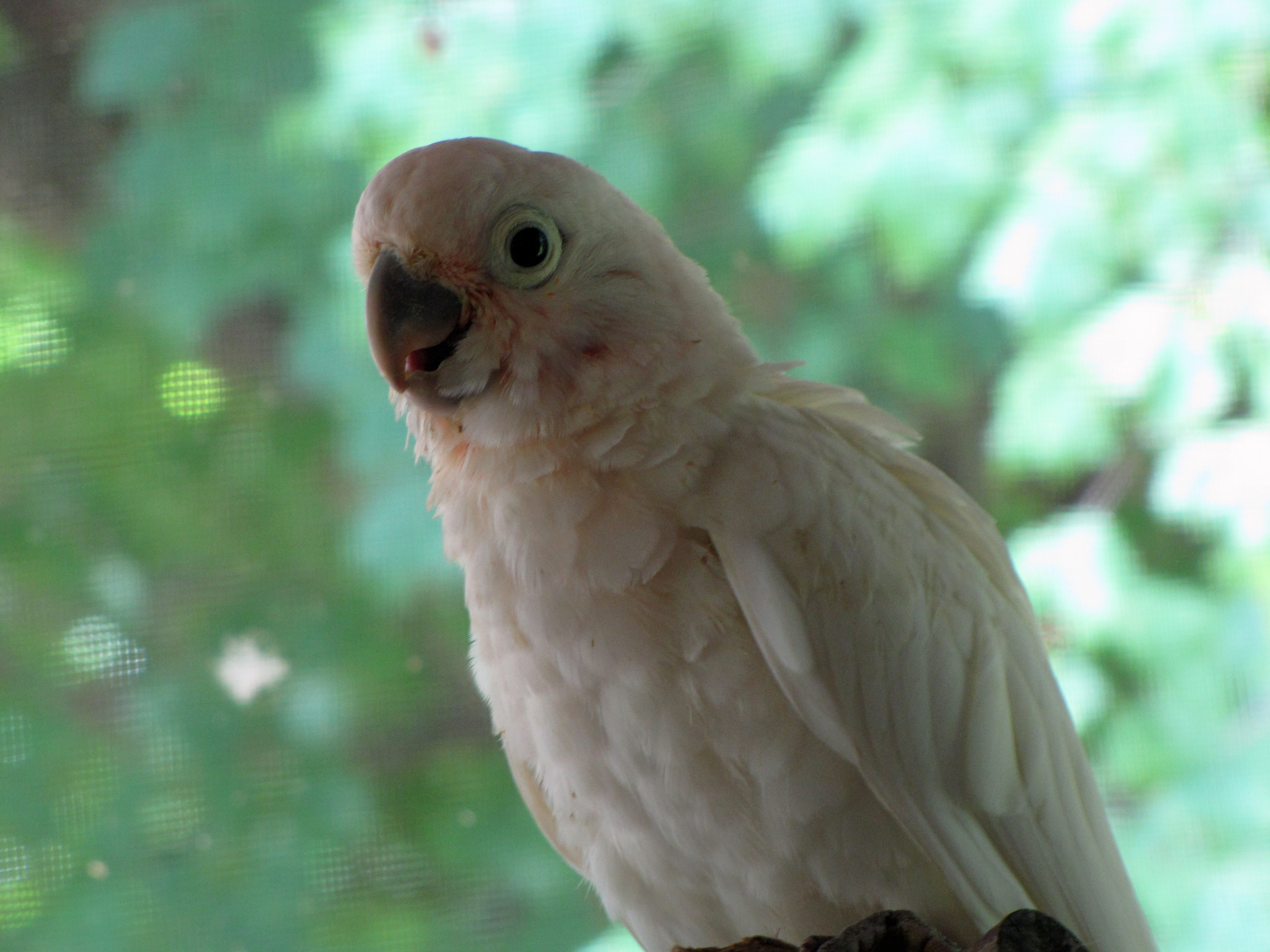
A pet juvenile

Due to ongoing habitat loss on Tanimbar, limited range, and illegal hunting, the Tanimbar corella is evaluated as near threatened on the IUCN Red List of Threatened Species. It is listed on Appendix I of CITES. In the 1970s, Japanese loggers ravaged the islands. Many of the dazed, disoriented birds were captured for the pet trade. Although many died from stress during shipment, a small silver lining may remain behind this ecological disaster, because many Tanimbar corellas have reproduced in captive-breeding programs. As such, more Tanimbar corellas are now in captivity than in the wild.

== Scientific naming ==
Historically, the discovery of the species as Lophochroa goffini is attributed to Otto Finsch in 1863. It was named after Andreas Leopold Goffin, a friend of Finsch's and apparently a Dutch naval lieutenant who died the same year at the age of 26.

In 2000, Finsch's formal description of this species was found to be based on two specimens that actually belonged to an entirely different cockatoo species, Ducorps's or Solomons cockatoo (Cacatua ducorpsii). Cacatua goffini thus became a synonym for Cacatua ducorpsii, leaving this species without a proper scientific name and description. In 2004, the species was formally described as Cacatua goffiniana, maintaining the intent of Finsch to name a species of cockatoo after his friend. The new description is based on an individual collected from the Tanimbar Islands in 1923 by Dr. Felix Kopstein.

== In aviculture ==
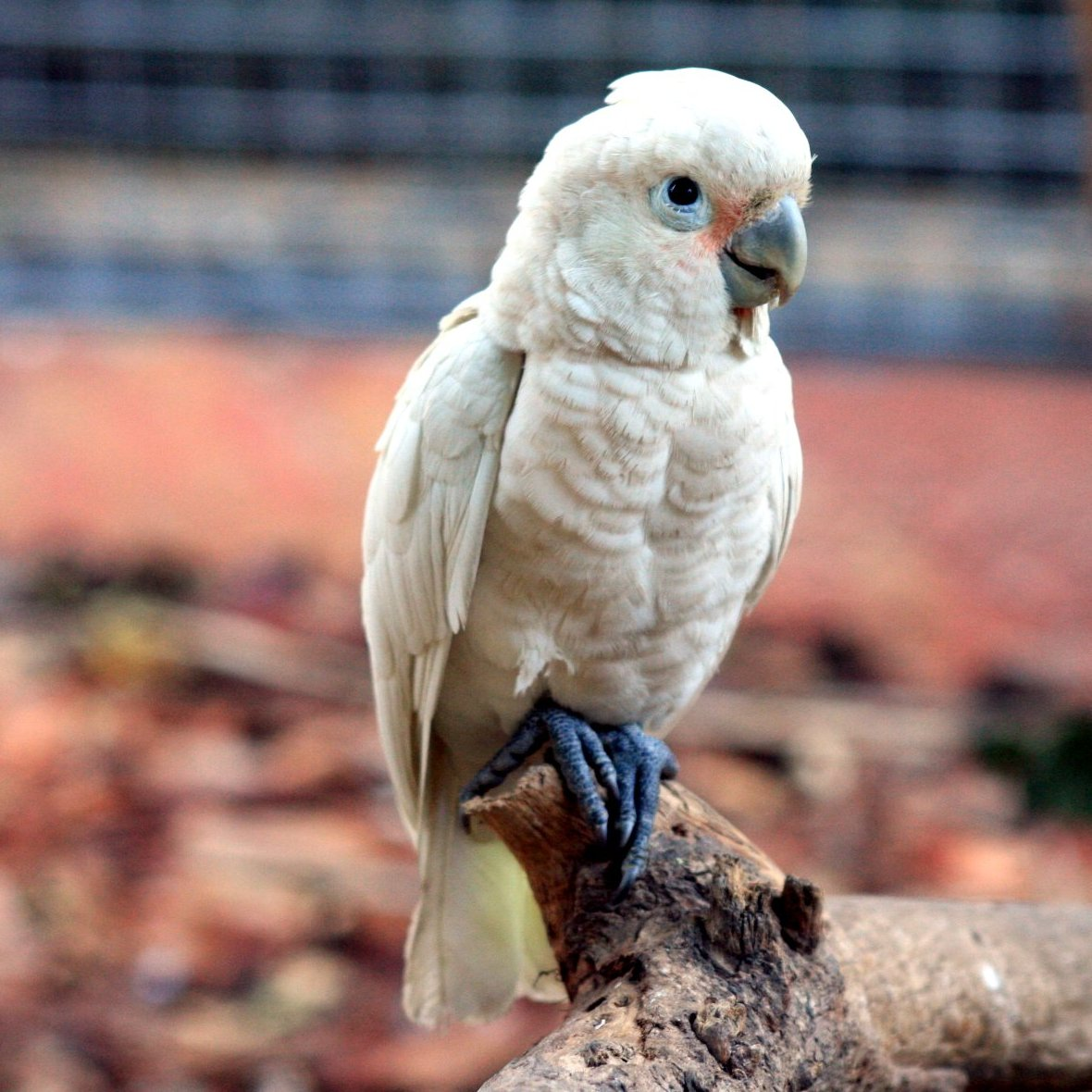
In an aviary

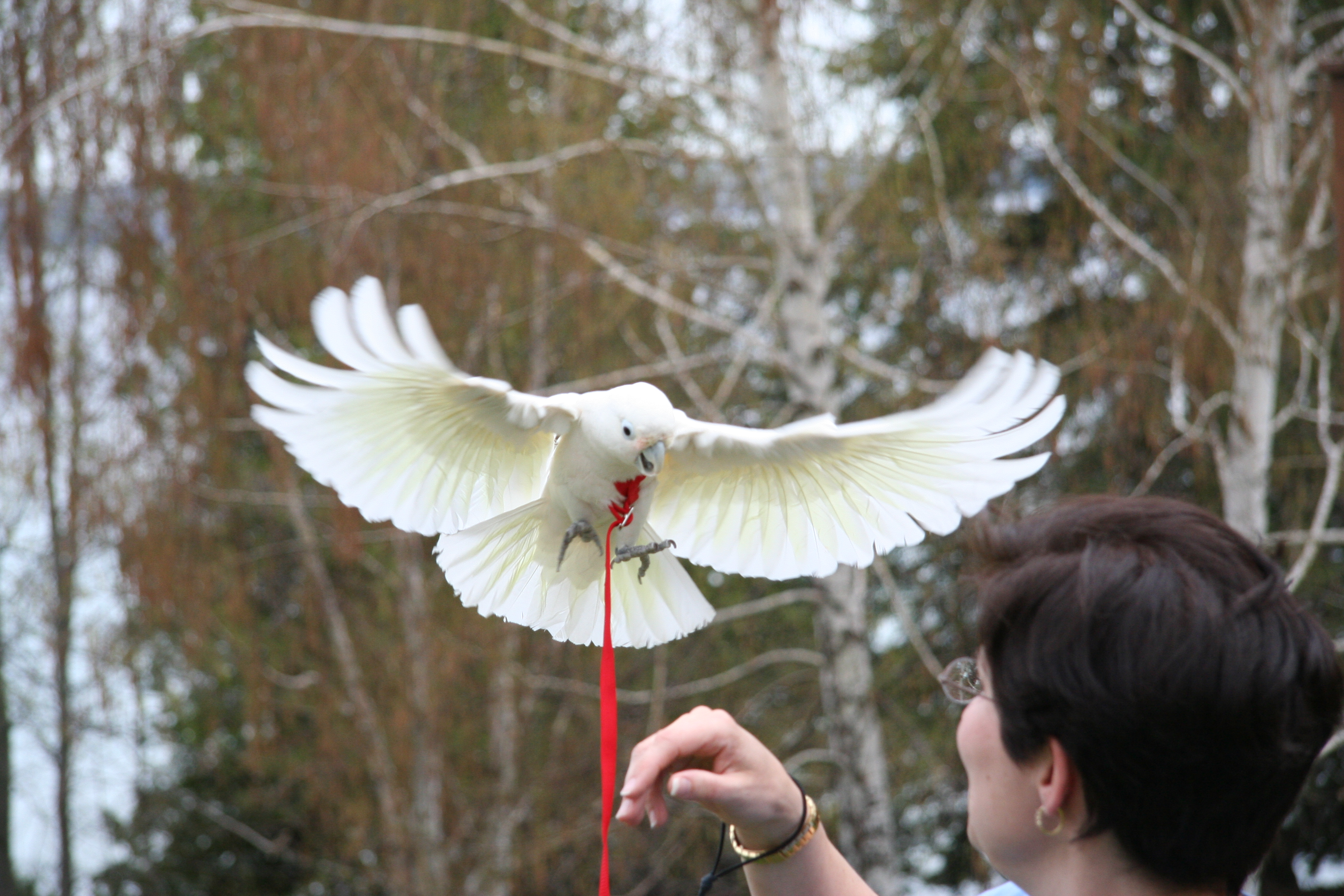
Pet flying in a harness

In aviculture, the parrot is widely known as Goffin's cockatoo. Pet birds hand reared from hatching can imitate human speech, but generally they are not good talkers. They are generally quieter than the "large cockatoos", but can still be quite loud, and they have a sharp screech that some find irritating.

Tanimbar corellas learn by watching and copying. Just by opening the cage door, a Tanimbar corella's attention can be drawn to the latch on its cage and it can learn by trial and error how to open the latch with its beak and escape the cage in seconds. Tanimbar corellas can destroy furniture with their beaks and can chew through wires and cause potentially dangerous electrical incidents.

Hand-reared Tanimbar corellas tend to demand a lot of attention. Occasionally, captive birds of this species (like many cockatoos) develop self-destructive behaviours such as feather-plucking, or stereotypy if they do not have an interesting and enriching environment. Caged Tanimbar corellas require a frequent change of toys to play with so they do not become bored. They need time out of their cage for one-on-one social contact of at least four hours daily and also to exercise their wings and fly. Even very tame birds can bite humans when irritated or even when being excessively playful. Their droppings are semisolid and can be messy. The World Parrot Trust recommends that the Tanimbar corella be kept in an enclosure with a minimum length of 3 m. Many new bird owners are not aware of the time and money a cockatoo demands, and pet birds are often passed from one owner to the next or relinquished to animal shelters.

Tanimbar corella chicks make a repetitive soft howling/screeching noise (producer calls) when they are hungry.

In the UK, their sale is controlled as they are classified as a rare species (CITES Appendix I). The seller of each bird must have an official certificate to prove that it was captive-bred and not imported.

== Intelligence ==
Goffin cockatoo dipping noodles in blueberry soy yogurt. This behaviour has been documented in multiple individuals at the Vienna Goffin Lab. This represents the first controlled study that provides evidence of food-flavouring in non-human animals.

Experimental evidence from multiple studies appear to indicate that the Tanimbar corella possesses considerable intelligence. Tool-use behaviour has been observed by this species in captivity. It was reported in November 2012 by Professor Alice Auersperg of the University of Vienna that a male named Figaro was observed spontaneously shaping splinters of wood and small sticks to create rakes that were then used to extend his reach and retrieve otherwise unavailable food items located on the other side of his aviary mesh.

In July 2013, the results of a joint study involving scientists from the University of Oxford, the University of Vienna, and the Max Planck Institute, again involving the Tanimbar corellas of the Vienna Goffin Lab, were announced. The birds were discovered to possess the ability to solve complex mechanical problems, in one case spontaneously working out how to open a five-part locking mechanism in sequence to retrieve a food item. The corellas were able to very quickly adapt their behaviour and again open the lock when the mechanism sections were modified or reordered, demonstrating an apparent concept of working towards a particular goal and knowledge of the way in which physical objects act upon each other – rather than merely an ability to repeat a learned sequence of actions. A 2022 study involving a golf-like task further demonstrated the Tanimbar corella's problem-solving skills, with the cockatoos spontaneously figuring out how to use a stick to hit a marble into a designated hole to release a cashew nut reward. One bird (Figaro – also featured in the 2012 experiment) also devised a method of cheating the test, using his stick as a lever to lift and drop the test apparatus and trigger the cashew release mechanism.

A later experiment also conducted at the Vienna Goffin Lab by Prof. Auersperg and her team broadly adapted the Stanford marshmallow experiment for the Tanimbar corella, to investigate whether the birds were capable of self-control and of anticipating a delayed gain. The corellas were given the opportunity to exchange a favoured food item (in this case a pecan nut) for an even more desirable nut (a cashew), if they were only able to hold the first nut for a period of time and then return it to the human researcher's hand uneaten – at which point the nuts would be exchanged. Although pecan nuts are normally consumed instantly, the corellas were able to resist the temptation to eat the nut for periods of time for up to 80 seconds, once aware that a cashew was also on offer. This behaviour (having also previously been demonstrated in corvids) further disproves the previous belief that birds are incapable of self-control. Further work by Auersperg's team, published in November 2018, showed that the corellas could cut cardboard to length with their beak, to obtain a reward, but seemed unable to change the width of the tools, perhaps due to the physical limitations of their beaks.

Further research in 2020 by Auersperg's team compared the problem-solving ability of the captive-bred corellas at the Goffin Lab with wild birds caught in Tanimbar and exposed to the same experimental conditions – in which the birds were placed in an "innovation arena" and presented a series of 20 different tasks (e.g. pressing a button, turning a wheel, pulling out a drawer, removing a twig, overturning a cup, opening a clip, etc.), in which they could choose to partake, to obtain a food reward. While the wild Goffins were less inclined to interact with the test apparatus, those that did solved the presented tasks at a similar rate to the captive-bred birds.

Wild corellas were also observed shaping sticks of different dimensions to create a series of tools, which enabled them to eat sea mango seeds.

A 2020 study concluded that the Tanimbar corella may be capable of developing reading-comprehension skills. In experimental conditions, a hen bird named Ellie demonstrated the ability to associate written words with images and spoken words with an accuracy of 94%, thus displaying orthographic processing, grapheme-phoneme correspondence, and semantic processing, three skills that are required for reading. Ellie also learned how to use a communication board on a tablet computer to express her wishes to researchers, touching symbols on the screen to request food items, drinks, activities, objects, and social interaction.

In 2025, goffins were observed preferentially dunking noodles and potato pieces in blueberry yoghurt in order to flavour their food.
