= Great Key Island giant rat =

Great Key Island uromys

Conservation status
- Data Deficient (IUCN 3.1)

Scientific classification
- Kingdom: Animalia
- Phylum: Chordata
- Class: Mammalia
- Order: Rodentia
- Family: Muridae
- Genus: Uromys
- Species: U. siebersi

Binomial name
- Uromys siebersi Thomas, 1923

Species of rodent

The Great Key Island giant rat, or Great Key Island uromys (Uromys siebersi) is a species of rodent in the family Muridae. It is known only from Great Key Island, Indonesia.

The species name is after the ornithologist H. C. Siebers.
