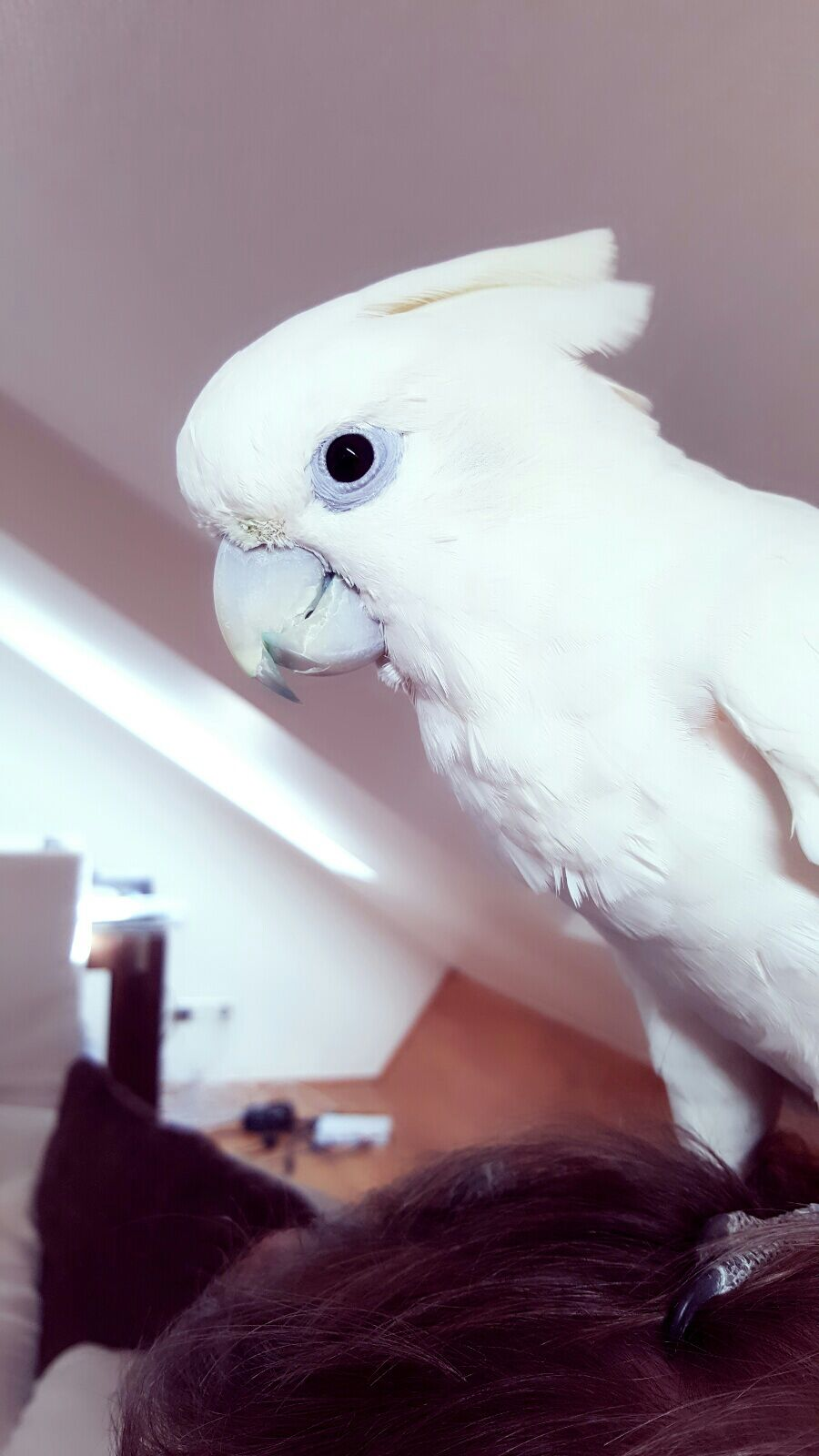

Conservation status
- Least Concern (IUCN 3.1)

Scientific classification
- Kingdom: Animalia
- Phylum: Chordata
- Class: Aves
- Order: Psittaciformes
- Family: Cacatuidae
- Genus: Cacatua
- Subgenus: Licmetis
- Species: C. ducorpsii

Binomial name
- Cacatua ducorpsii Pucheran, 1853

Synonyms
- Cacatua tanimberensis Roselaar & Prins, 2000; Lophochroa goffini Finsch, 1863

= Solomons corella =

Species of bird

The Solomons corella (Cacatua ducorpsii), also known as Solomons cockatoo, Ducorps's cockatoo or broad-crested corella, is a species of cockatoo endemic to the Solomon Islands archipelago. This small white cockatoo is larger than the Tanimbar corella yet smaller than the umbrella cockatoo. The species is common across most of the Solomons, absent only from Makira in the south. It inhabits lowland rainforests, secondary forests, cleared areas and gardens.

== Description ==
The Solomons corella is about 30 cm (12 in) long. They are predominantly white. They have a blue eye ring and a recumbent crest which resembles a sail in its raised state. As other members of the subgenus Licmetis, it has a pale bill.

== Distribution & population ==
The Solomons corella is abundant on all islands in the archipelago except Makira and surrounding islands. Ornithologists estimate that the bird has a population of around 100,000 individual birds. It has been listed as Least Concern by the International Union for Conservation of Nature.

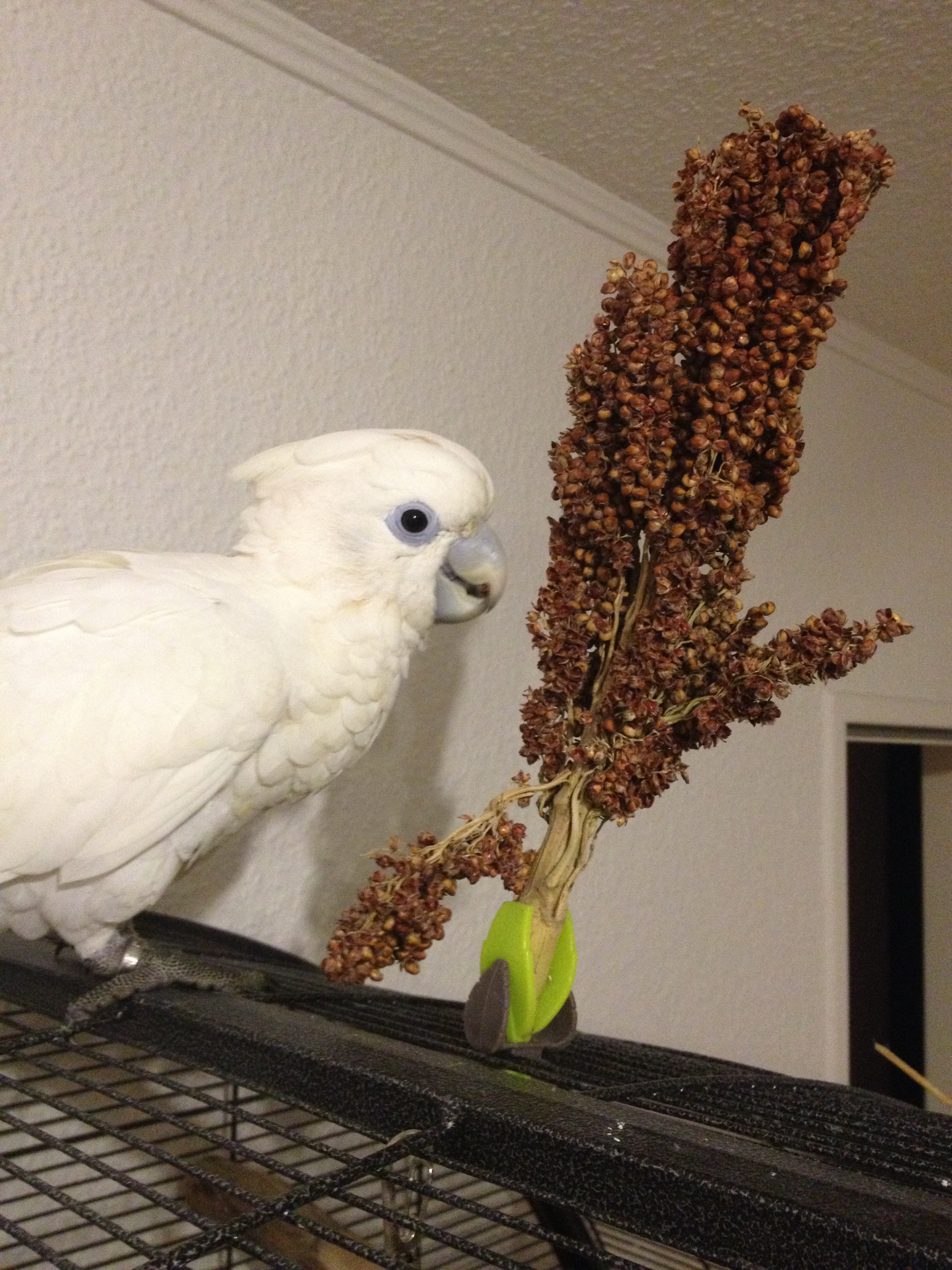
Solomons corella on a Dari millet

== Breeding ==
The Solomons corella nests in tree cavities. The eggs are white and there are usually two in a clutch. The eggs are incubated for about 25 days and the chicks leave the nest about 62 days after hatching. Wild birds typically breed from July–September.
