= Bismarck giant rat =

Conservation status
- Near Threatened (IUCN 3.1)

Scientific classification
- Kingdom: Animalia
- Phylum: Chordata
- Class: Mammalia
- Order: Rodentia
- Family: Muridae
- Genus: Uromys
- Species: U. neobritannicus

Binomial name
- Uromys neobritannicus Tate & Archbold, 1935

Species of rodent

The Bismarck giant rat (Uromys neobritannicus) is a species of rodent in the family Muridae. It is endemic to the island of New Britain, Papua New Guinea.
