= Masked white-tailed rat =

Conservation status
- Near Threatened (IUCN 3.1)
- Least Concern (NCA)

Scientific classification
- Kingdom: Animalia
- Phylum: Chordata
- Class: Mammalia
- Order: Rodentia
- Family: Muridae
- Genus: Uromys
- Species: U. hadrourus

Binomial name
- Uromys hadrourus (Winter, 1983)

Species of rodent

The masked white-tailed rat (Uromys hadrourus) is a species of rodent in the family Muridae. It is endemic to the Wet Tropics bioregion of Queensland, Australia.

Descriptive English common names for this species include Masked White-tailed Rat and Thornton Peak Uromys. During the 1990s there was a push for such names to be replaced with indigenous Australian names, and accordingly, in 1995 the Australian Nature Conservation Agency published recommendations for the common names of rodents. They failed to identify any indigenous Australian names for U. hadrourus, so recommended the adoption of the name Kuku, the Kuku-Yalanki name for any rat. However this recommendation was not prescriptive, and it remains to be seen to what extent it will be adopted.
