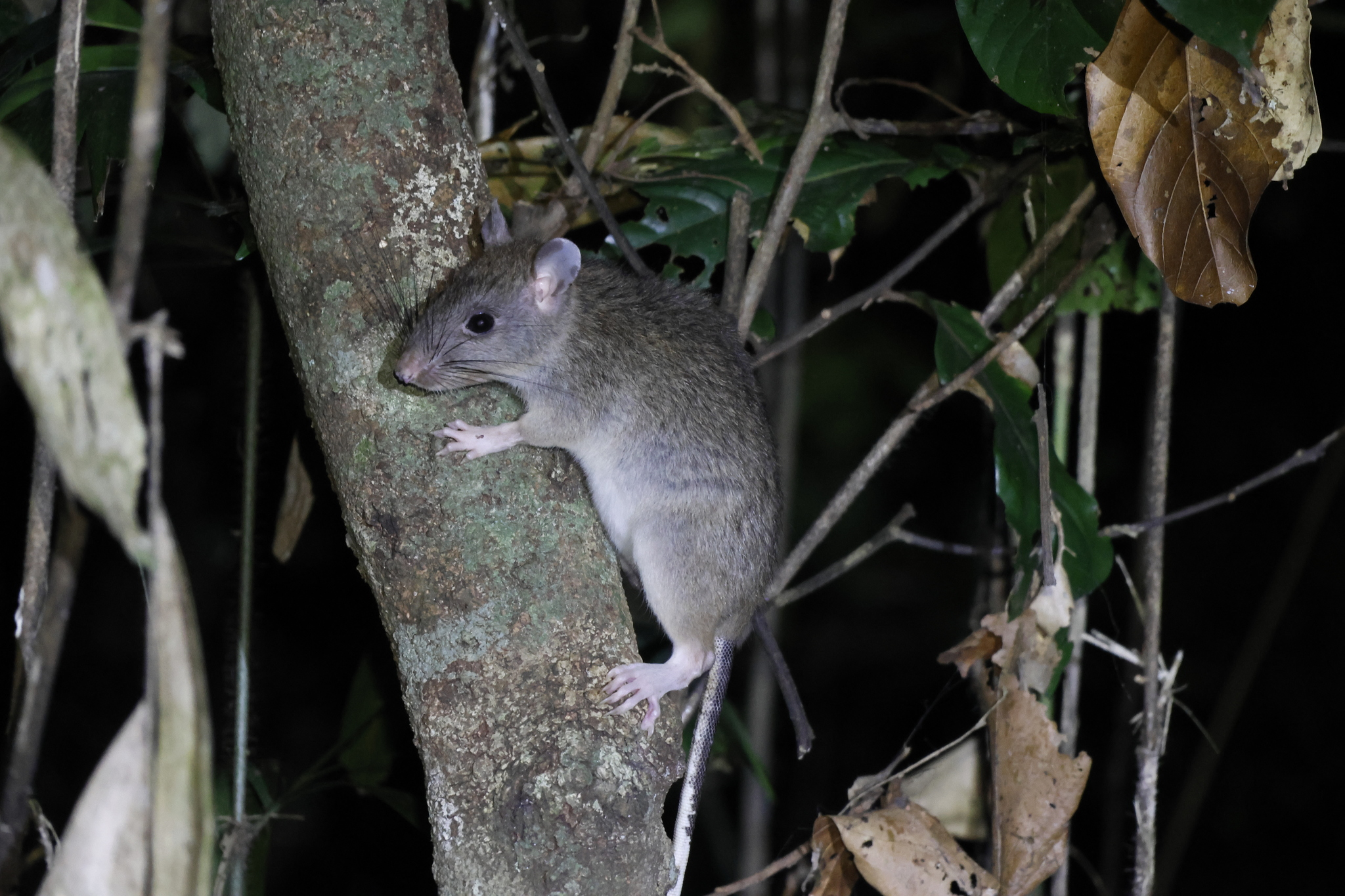
- East Barron, Queensland, Australia

Conservation status
- Least Concern (IUCN 3.1)

Scientific classification
- Kingdom: Animalia
- Phylum: Chordata
- Class: Mammalia
- Infraclass: Placentalia
- Order: Rodentia
- Family: Muridae
- Genus: Uromys
- Species: U. caudimaculatus

Binomial name
- Uromys caudimaculatus (Krefft, 1867)

= Giant white-tailed rat =

Species of rodent

The giant white-tailed rat (Uromys caudimaculatus) is an Australian rodent native to tropical rainforest of north Queensland, Australia with subspecies occurring in New Guinea and the Aru Islands. It is one of the largest rodents in Australia, reaching up to 1 kg in weight. It is grey-brown above, cream to white below, and has a long, naked tail of which the distal section is white (Moore 1995).

Breeding commences in September or October, peaking in December and January at the height of the wet season. After a gestation of 36 days, a litter of two to three (rarely four) young are born, and remain with the mother for approximately three months (Moore 1995).

== Common names ==
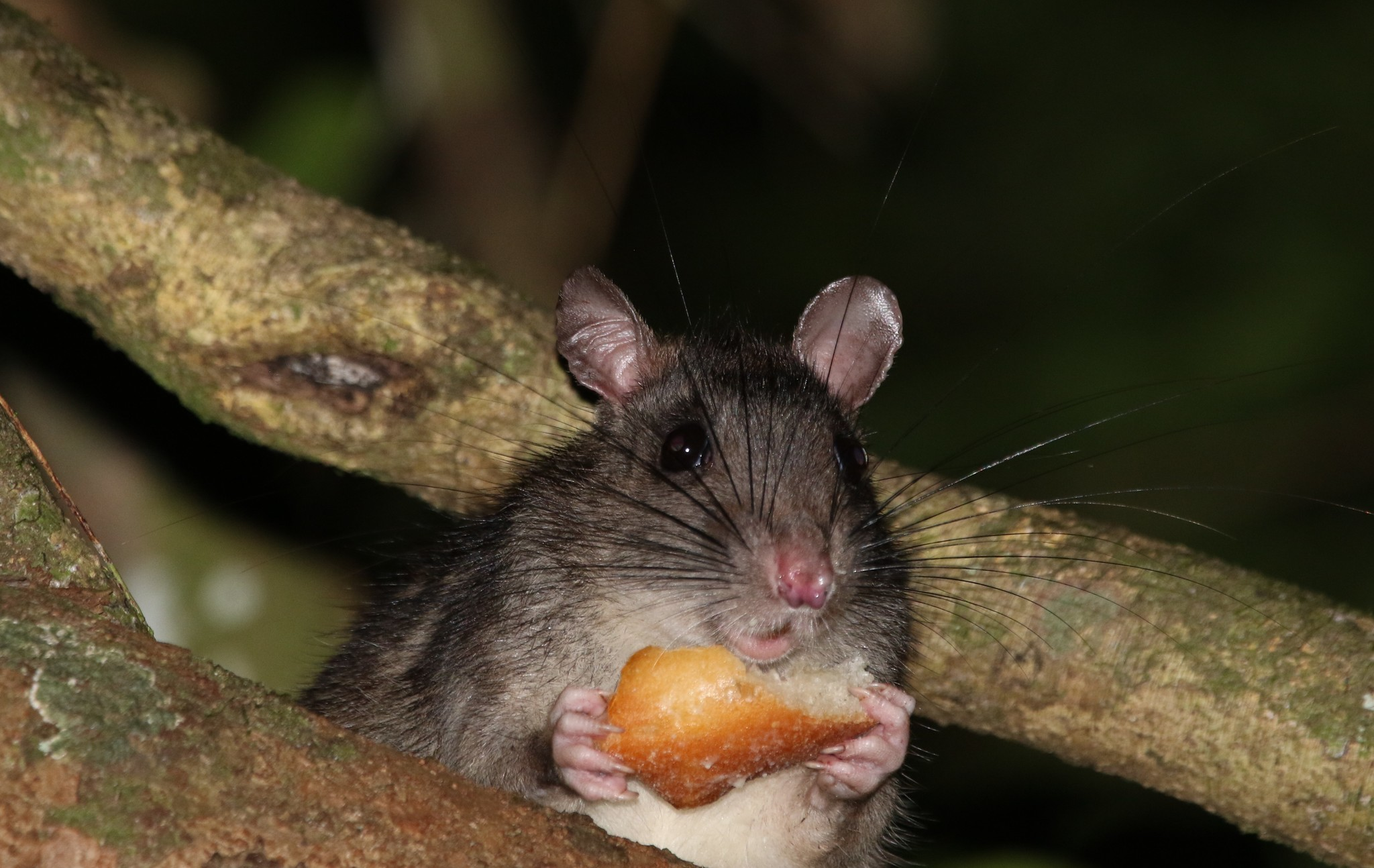
A giant white-tailed rat eating a fruit

The common name of this species has long been white-tailed rat or giant white-tailed rat. During the 1990s there was a push for such descriptive English common names to be replaced with indigenous Australian names, and accordingly, in 1995 the Australian Nature Conservation Agency published recommendations for the common names of rodents. They compiled six indigenous names for this species: the Yidiny name Durrgim; the Jaabugay name Durrkin; the Gnog names Jikoy, Koojang and Parrongkai; and the Kuuku Ya'u name Thupi. Despite this they recommended the adoption of the name Mati, which is a general name for rats and mice recorded from the vicinity of the Peach River on Cape York. However this recommendation was not prescriptive, and it remains to be seen to what extent it will be adopted.

It is known as kabkal in the Kalam language of Papua New Guinea.
