= Emperor rat =

Conservation status
- Critically endangered, possibly extinct (IUCN 3.1)

Scientific classification
- Kingdom: Animalia
- Phylum: Chordata
- Class: Mammalia
- Order: Rodentia
- Family: Muridae
- Genus: Uromys
- Species: U. imperator

Binomial name
- Uromys imperator (Thomas, 1888)

Extinct species of rodent

The emperor rat (Uromys imperator) is a large species of rodent in the family Muridae. It is endemic to the island of Guadalcanal in the Solomon Islands. It is classified as critically endangered by the IUCN but is likely already extinct.
