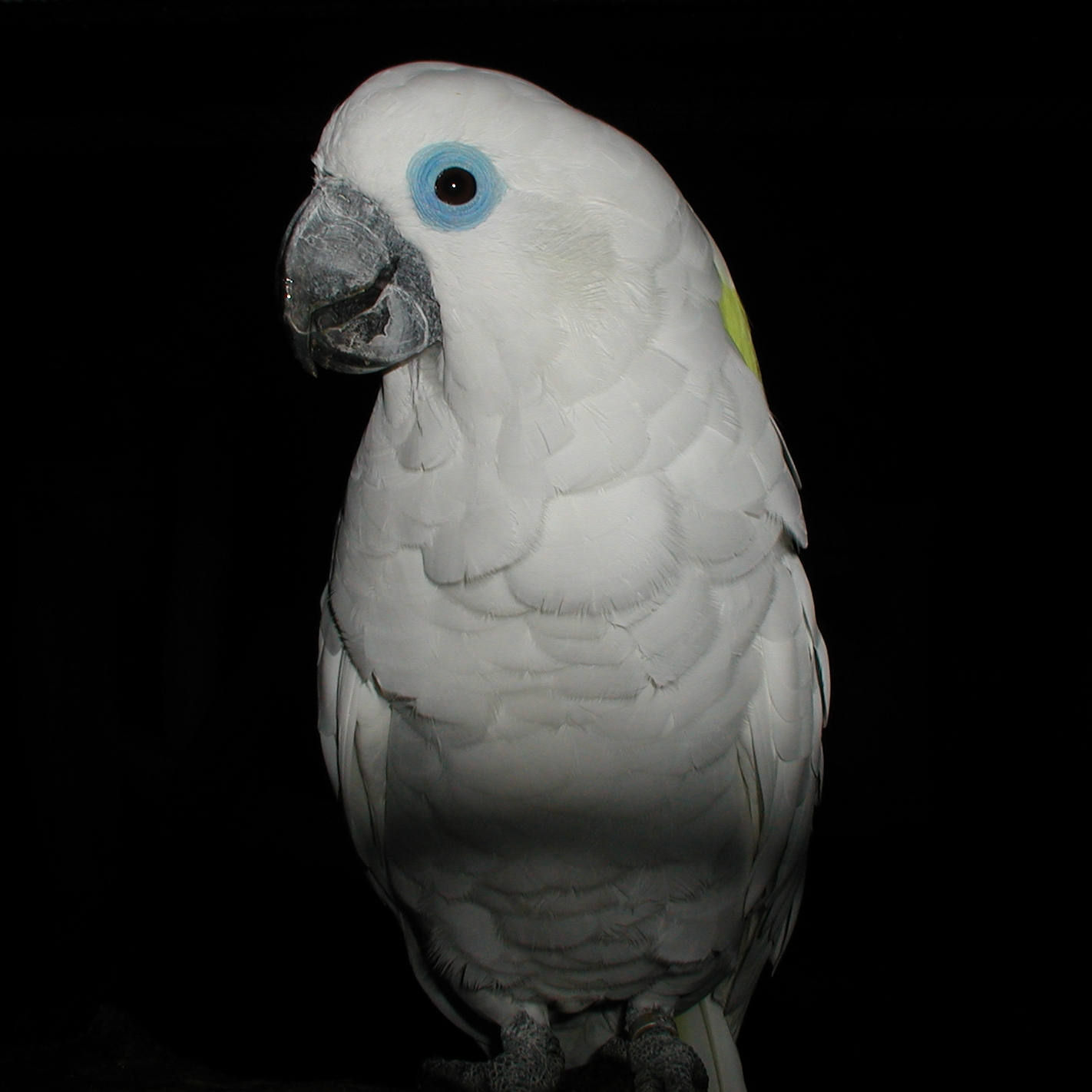
- At Walsrode Bird Park, Germany

Conservation status
- Vulnerable (IUCN 3.1)

Scientific classification
- Kingdom: Animalia
- Phylum: Chordata
- Class: Aves
- Order: Psittaciformes
- Family: Cacatuidae
- Genus: Cacatua
- Subgenus: Cacatua
- Species: C. ophthalmica

Binomial name
- Cacatua ophthalmica Sclater, PL, 1864
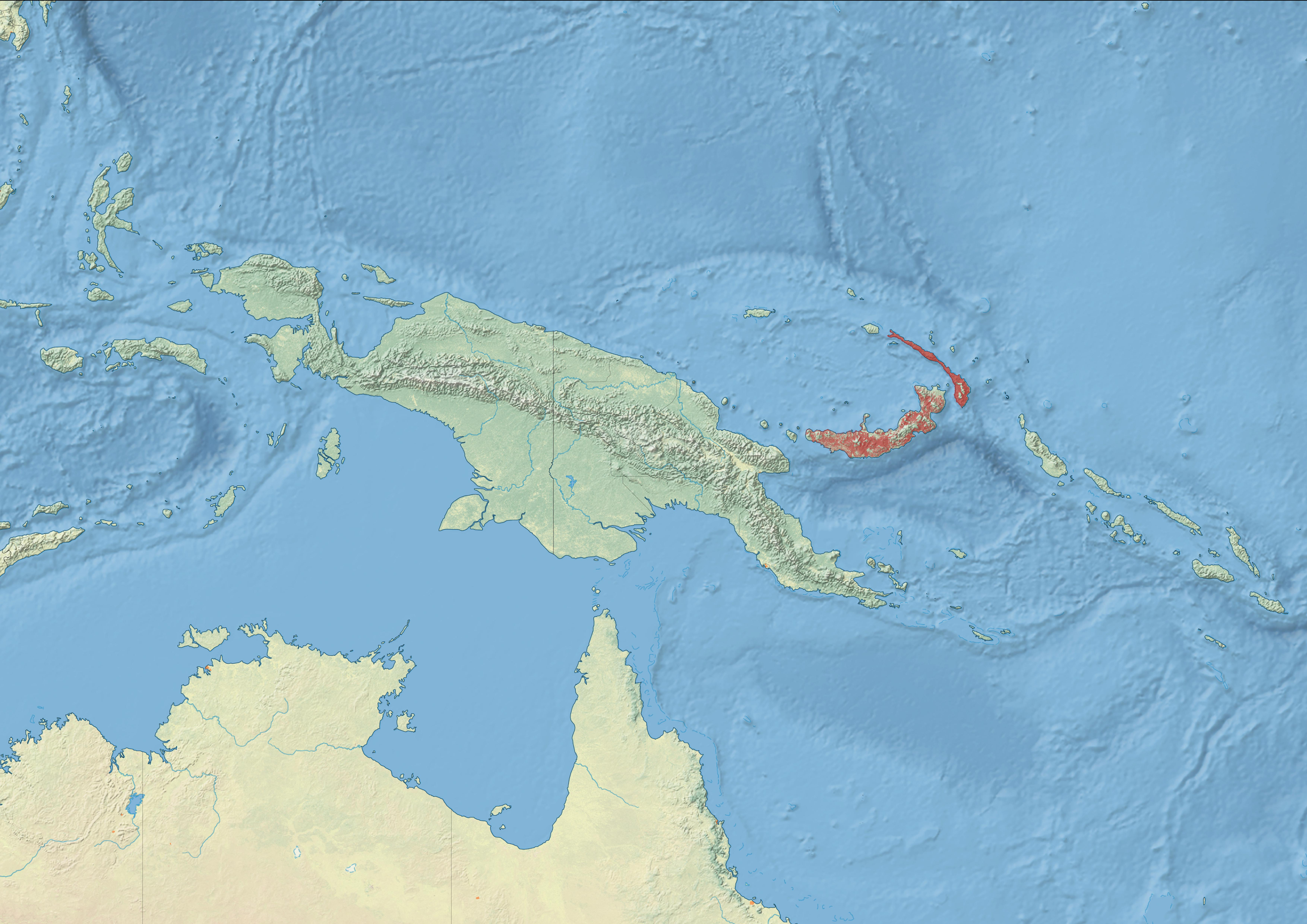
- The Distribution of the blue-eyed cockatoo

= Blue-eyed cockatoo =

Type of cockatoo

The blue-eyed cockatoo (Cacatua ophthalmica) is a large, mainly white cockatoo about 50 cm (20 in) long with a mobile crest, a black beak, and a light blue rim of featherless skin around each eye that gives this species its name.

Like all cockatoos and many parrots, the blue-eyed cockatoo can use one of its zygodactyl feet to hold objects and to bring food to its beak whilst standing on the other foot. Among bird species as a whole, this is relatively unusual.

== Description ==
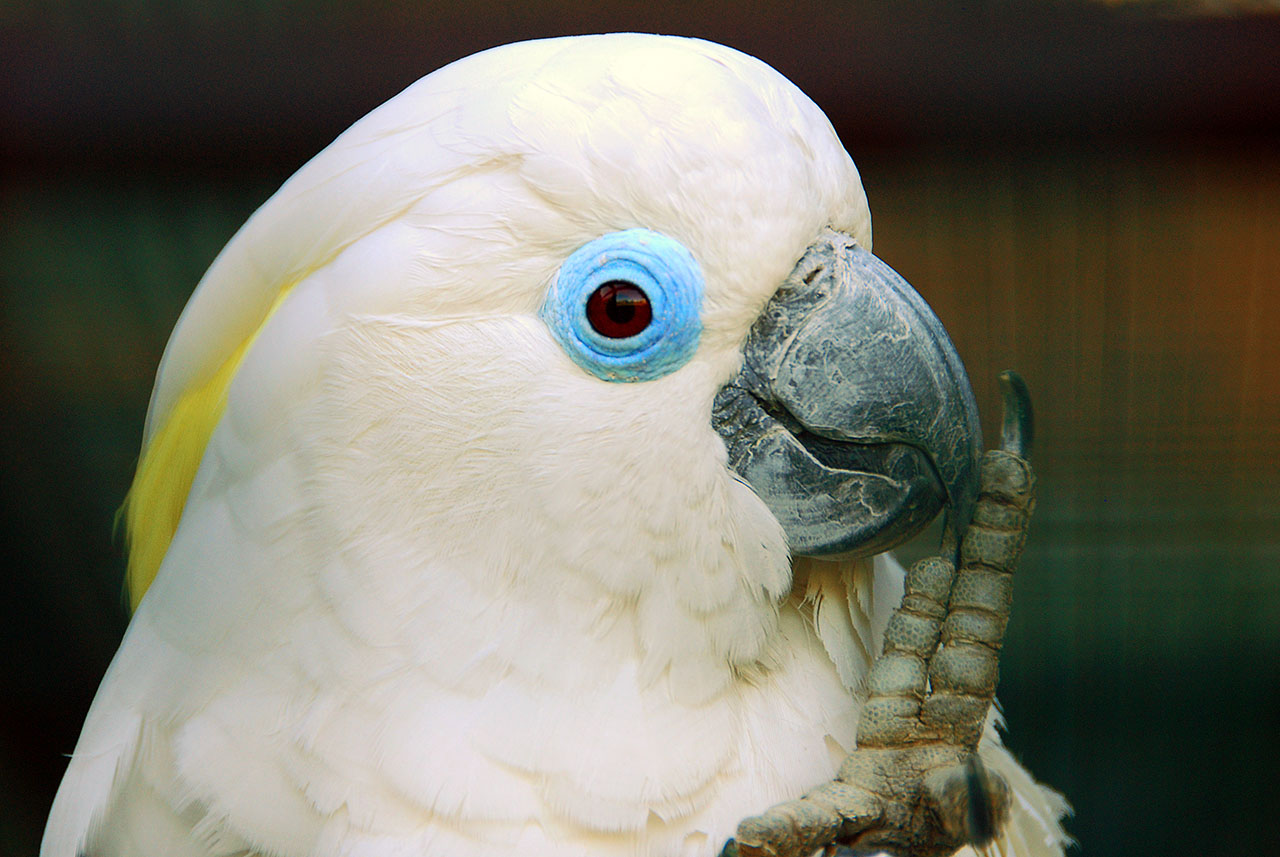
At Walsrode Bird Park

The blue-eyed cockatoo is a large, about 50-cm-long, mainly white cockatoo with an erectile yellow and white crest, a black beak, dark grey legs, and a light blue rim of featherless skin around each eye, that gives this species its name. The sexes are very similar in appearance. Some males have dark brown irises and some females have reddish-brown irises, but this small difference is not always reliable as a sex indicator. The blue-eyed cockatoo is easily mistaken for the yellow-crested and sulphur-crested cockatoos, but has a more rounded crest with more white to the frontal part, and a brighter blue eye-ring. The blue-eyed cockatoo reaches full maturity after 4 years and lives an average of 50 years.

Blue-eyed cockatoo has been known to make demanding, but great house pets. This bird has been called by some as the friendliest and most loving of all the cockatoo species. Household skills include mimicking owners, laying on the back of loved ones, and their love of play. Due to their interaction ability, these pets require quite a bit of attention. A lack of interaction could result in self-mutilation from the bird, that includes feather plucking.

== Diet ==
The blue eyed cockatoo's diet mainly consists of various seeds and nuts, berries, and fruits. They are also known to feed on insects and their larvae.

== Habitat ==
The blue-eyed cockatoo is endemic to the lowland forests of New Britain east of New Guinea, and it is the only cockatoo in the Bismarck Archipelago. These low-land forests consist of primary (untouched) forests, selectively logged forests, and gardened forests, or ones tended by indigenous people. In the 1960s, researchers found it difficult to find the majestic bird due to their flight routes they took in these gardened forests. Packs of the bird would fly 3,280 feet in the air, resulting in a difficult time catching a sighting of them. They are not very particular of the types of trees they choose to nest, but are found more abundantly and actively in primary forests versus gardened forests. The nests are usually located in very large trees, at an average height of 41 m (135 ft). Psittacine habits also suggest that blue-eyed cockatoos may make altitude and seasonal migratory movements throughout the year. As of 2012, the blue-eyed cockatoo's population ranges from 10,000 mature individuals to 15,000 individuals in general. This population, however, is declining.

== Status ==
Initially classified as a species of least concern by the IUCN in 2004, it is suspected to have become much rarer in recent times than was assumed previously. Consequently, it was uplisted to vulnerable in 2008.

The threat of this species is most likely due to the rapid clearing of lowland forest into oil plantations, in which the blue-eyed cockatoo make its nesting sites. This rapid clearing is to be thought to have an effect in the cockatoo's breeding, which would cause a decline in the population. Illegal trade has also caused a market for this species, adding pressure to their decline. The traps used often prove to be damaging to the bird, some even consisting of branches covered in glue to capture them. Unlike other bird species endemic to these forests, which may have been able to fare well in less densely forested areas such as "forest gardens", the blue-eyed cockatoo apparently relies on primary forested areas. Observations have been made of the blue-eyed cockatoo in other areas of the forest, but the density of these birds seems to be greatest in the primary forest region.
