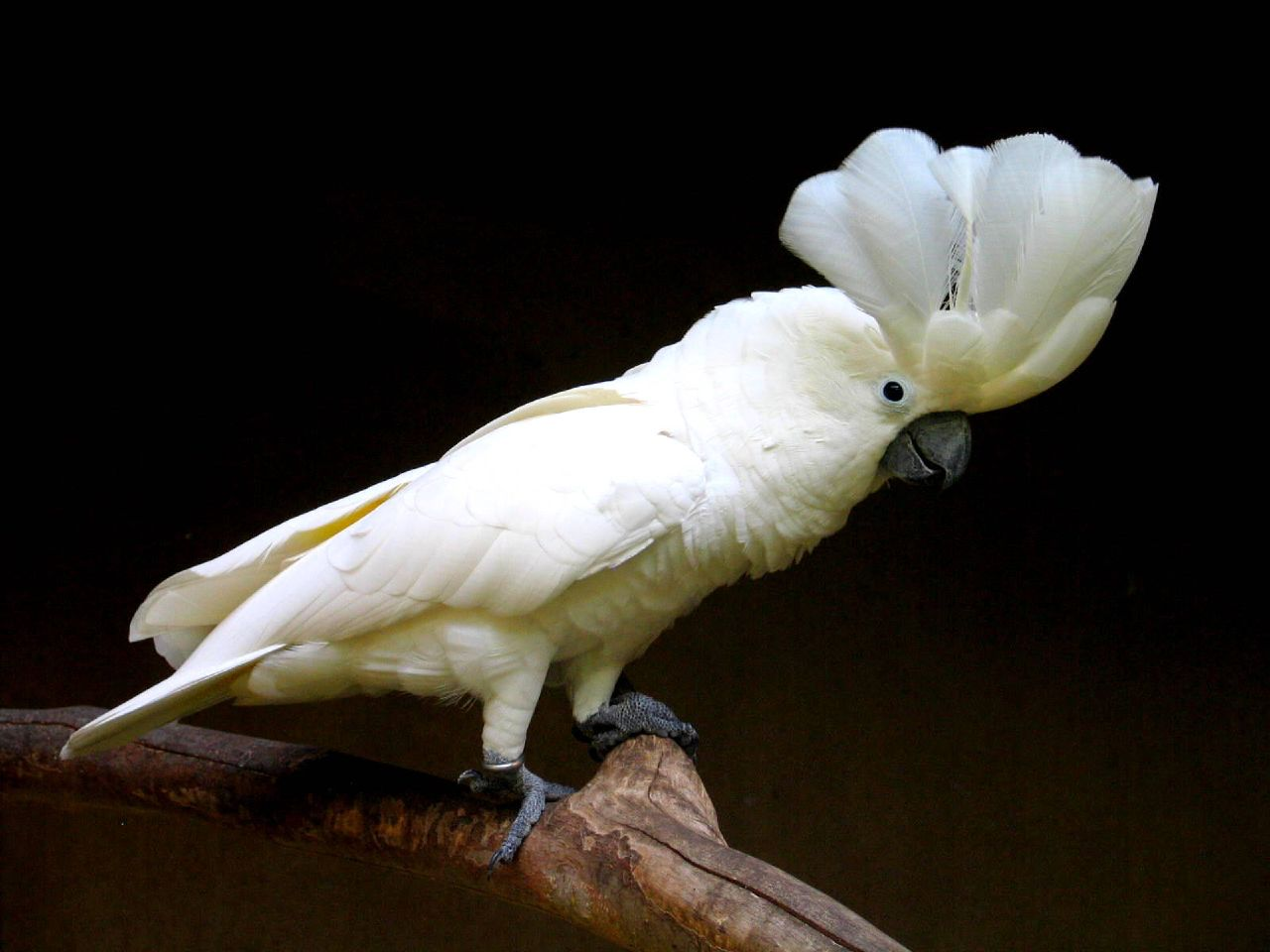
- At Bali Bird Park, in Indonesia

Conservation status
- Endangered (IUCN 3.1)

Scientific classification
- Kingdom: Animalia
- Phylum: Chordata
- Class: Aves
- Order: Psittaciformes
- Family: Cacatuidae
- Genus: Cacatua
- Subgenus: Cacatua
- Species: C. alba

Binomial name
- Cacatua alba (Müller, PLS, 1776)

= White cockatoo =

Species of bird

The white cockatoo (Cacatua alba), also known as the umbrella cockatoo, is a medium-sized all-white cockatoo endemic to tropical rainforest on islands of Indonesia. When surprised, it extends a large and striking head crest, which has a semicircular shape (similar to an umbrella, hence the alternative name). The wings and tail have a pale yellow or lemon color which is exposed when they fly. It is similar to other species of white cockatoo such as yellow-crested cockatoo, sulphur-crested cockatoo, and salmon-crested cockatoo, all of which have yellow, orange or pink crest feathers instead of white.

== Names ==
The white cockatoo is known as ayab (plural form: ayot) in the Burmeso language of Papua, Indonesia.

== Taxonomy ==
The white cockatoo was first described in 1776 by German zoologist Philipp Ludwig Statius Müller. Its species name alba is a feminine form of the Latin adjective albus for "white". It lies in the subgenus Cacatua within the genus Cacatua. The term "white cockatoo" has also been applied as a group term to members of the subgenus Cacatua, the genus Cacatua as well as larger groups including the pink cockatoo and the galah cockatoo.

== Description ==
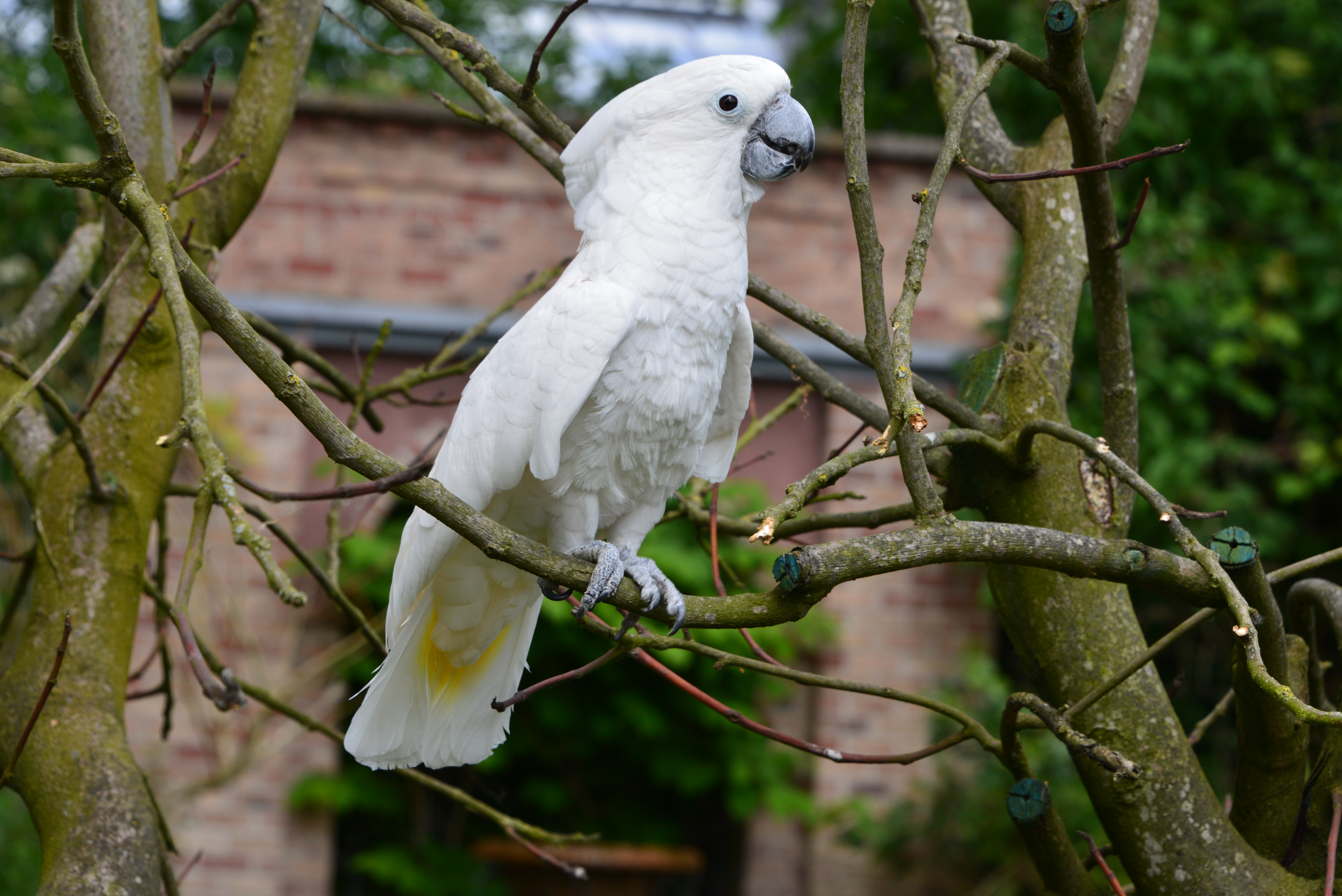
At Pairi Daiza, in Belgium

The white cockatoo is around 46 cm (18 in) long, and weighs about 400 g (14 oz) for small females and up to 800 g (28 oz) for big males. The male white cockatoo usually has a broader head and a bigger beak than the female. They have brown or black eyes and a dark grey beak. When mature some female white cockatoos can have reddish/brown irises, while the irises of the adult male are dark brown or black.

The feathers of the white cockatoo are mostly white. However, both upper and lower surfaces of the inner half of the trailing edge of the large wing feathers are a yellow color. The yellow color on the underside of the wings is most notable because the yellow portion of the upper surface of the feather is covered by the white of the feather immediately medial (nearer to the body) and above. Similarly, areas of larger tail feathers that are covered by other tail feathers – and the innermost covered areas of the larger crest feathers – are yellow. Short white feathers grow from and closely cover the upper legs. The feathers of this species and others create a powder similar to talcum powder that easily transfers to clothing.

In common with other cockatoos and parrots, the white cockatoo has zygodactyl feet with two toes facing forward and two facing backward, which enable it to grasp objects with one foot while standing on the other, for feeding and manipulation.

The maximal lifespan of the white cockatoo is poorly documented. A few zoos report that they live 40–60 years in captivity. Anecdotal reports suggest it can live longer. Lifespan in the wild is unknown but believed to be as much as ten years less.

== Distribution and habitat ==
Cacatua alba is endemic to lowland tropical rainforest on the Moluccan islands of Halmahera, Bacan, Ternate, Tidore, Kasiruta and Mandioli (Bacan group) in North Maluku, Indonesia. Records from Obi and Bisa (Obi group) are thought to be introductions, while a local introduced population breeds on Taiwan. It occurs in primary, logged, and secondary forests below 900m. It also occurs in mangroves and plantations including coconut and agricultural land. It remains locally common: in 1991–1992, the population was estimated at 42,545–183,129 birds (Lambert 1993), although this may be an underestimate as it was largely based on surveys from Bacan and not Halmahera where the species may have been more common.

Recent observations indicate that rapid declines are on-going, and are predicted to increase in the future (Vetter 2009). CITES data show significant harvest rates for the cage bird trade during the early 1990s. Annual harvests have declined in actual terms and as a proportion of the remaining population in recent years, but illegal trade continues and is likely to have been underestimated (S. Metz in litt. 2013)

== Behavior ==
=== Breeding ===
Like all cockatoos, the white cockatoo nests in hollows of large trees. Its eggs are white and there are usually two in a clutch. During the incubation period – about 28 days – both the female and male incubate the eggs. The larger chick becomes dominant over the smaller chick and takes more of the food. The chicks leave the nest about 84 days after hatching and are independent in 15–18 weeks.

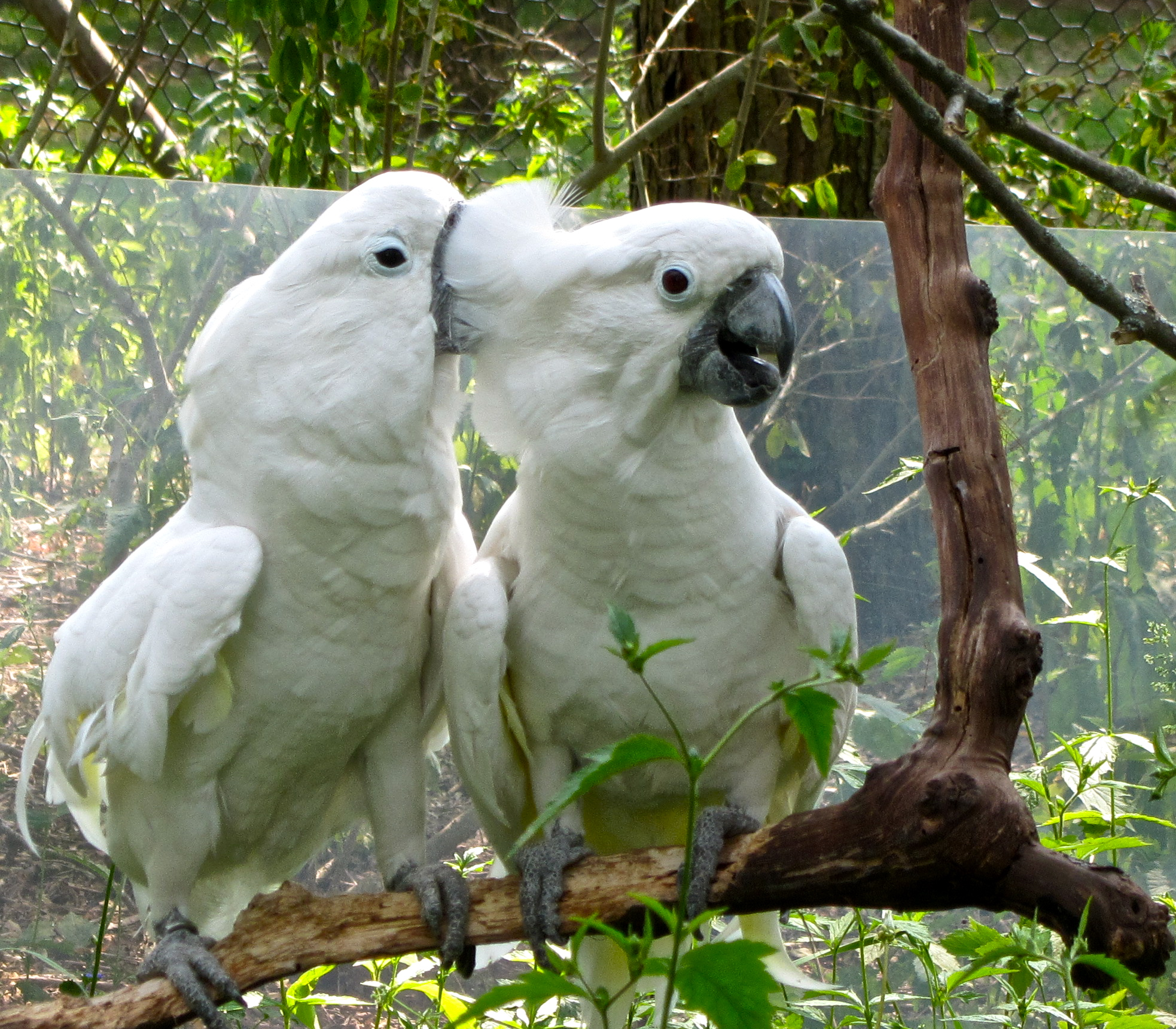
Allopreening, at Binder Park Zoo

Juveniles reach sexual maturity in 3–4 years. As part of the courtship behavior, the male ruffles his feathers, spreads his tail feathers, extends his wings, and erects his crest. He then bounces about. Initially, the female ignores or avoids him, but – provided he meets her approval – will eventually allow him to approach her. If his efforts are successful and he is accepted, the pair will be seen preening each other's head and scratching each other around the tail. These actions serve to strengthen their pair bond. Eventually, the male mounts the female and performs the actual act of mating by joining of the cloacae. For bonded pairs, this mating ritual is much shorter and the female may even approach the male. Once they are ready for nesting, breeding pairs separate from their groups and search for a suitable nest cavity (usually in trees).

=== Feeding ===
In the wild, white cockatoos feed on berries, seeds, nuts, fruit and roots. When nesting, they include insects and insect larvae. In their natural habitat, umbrella cockatoos typically feed on various seeds, nuts and fruits, such as papaya, durian, langsat and rambutan. As they also feed on corn growing in fields, they do considerable damage and are therefore considered crop pests by farmers. (BirdLife International, 2001) They also eat large insects, such as crickets (order Orthoptera) and small lizards such as skinks. Captive birds are usually provided a parrot mix containing various seeds, nuts and dried fruits and vegetables. Additionally, they need to be offered many fresh vegetables, fruits and branches (with leaves) for chewing and entertainment.

== Conservation status ==
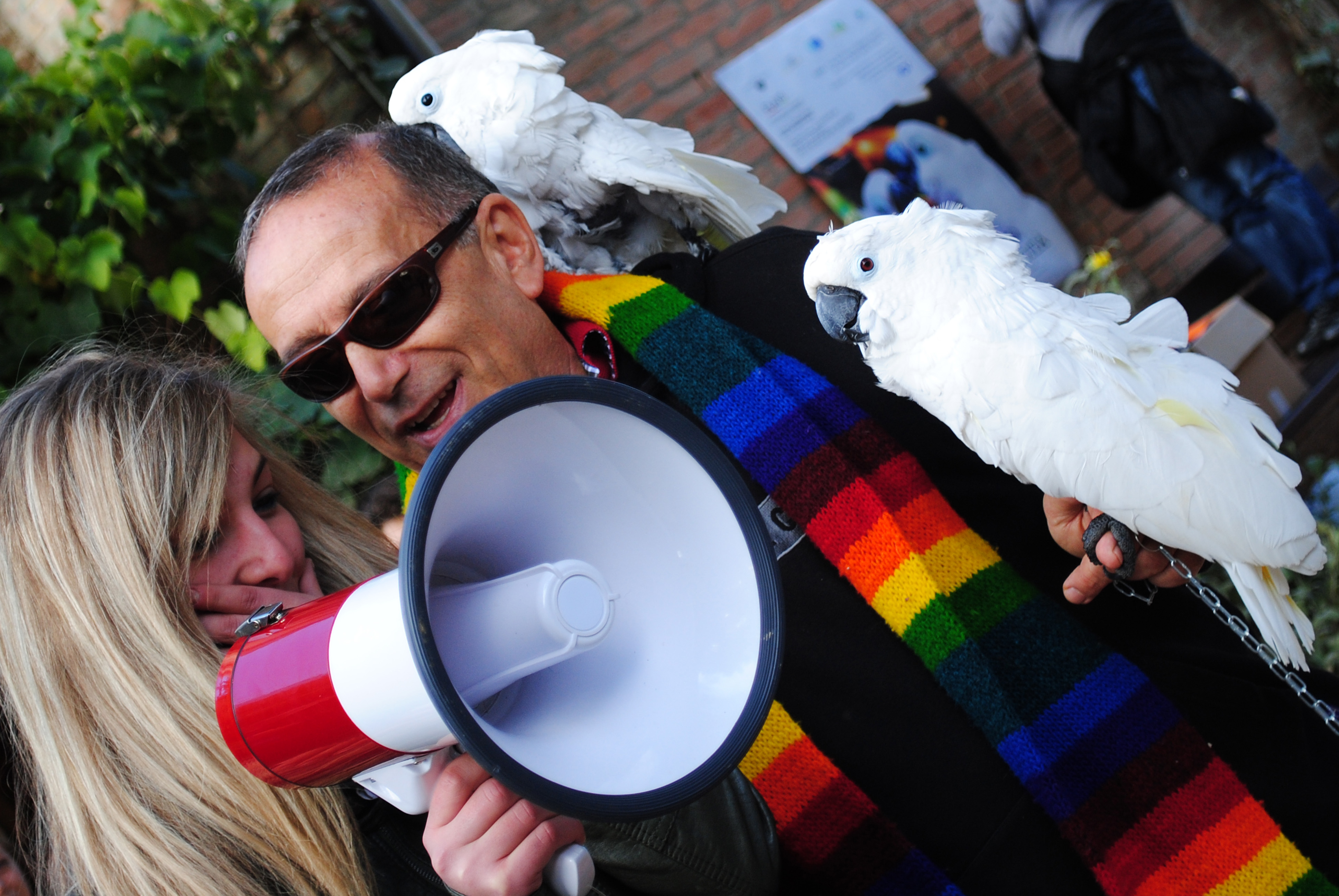
Perching on a tour guide at a zoo

The white cockatoo is considered Endangered by the IUCN. Its numbers in the wild have declined owing to capture for the cage bird trade and habitat loss. It is listed in appendix II of the CITES list which gives it protection by restricting export and import of wild-caught birds. BirdLife International indicates that catch quotas issued by the Indonesian government were 'exceeded by up to 18 times in some localities' in 1991, with at least 6,600 umbrella cockatoos being taken from the wild by trappers – although fewer birds have been taken from the wild in recent years, both in numerical terms and when taken as a proportion of the entire population. RSPCA supported surveys by the Indonesian NGO ProFauna suggest that significant levels of trade in wild-caught white cockatoos still occur, with 200+ taken from the wild in north Halmahera in 2007. Approximately 40% of the parrots (white cockatoo, chattering lory, violet-necked lory and eclectus parrot) caught in Halmahera are smuggled to the Philippines, while approximately 60% go to the domestic Indonesian trade, especially via bird markets in Surabaya and Jakarta.

The illegal trade of protected parrots violates Indonesian Act Number 5, 1990 (a wildlife law concerning Natural Resources and the Ecosystems Conservations).

== History ==
They were quite popular in China during the Tang dynasty, a fact which in turn influenced the depictions of Guan Yin with a white parrot. The Fourth Crusade was also sealed between Holy Roman Emperor Frederick II and the Sultan of Babylon in 1229 with a gift of a white cockatoo.

== Gallery ==
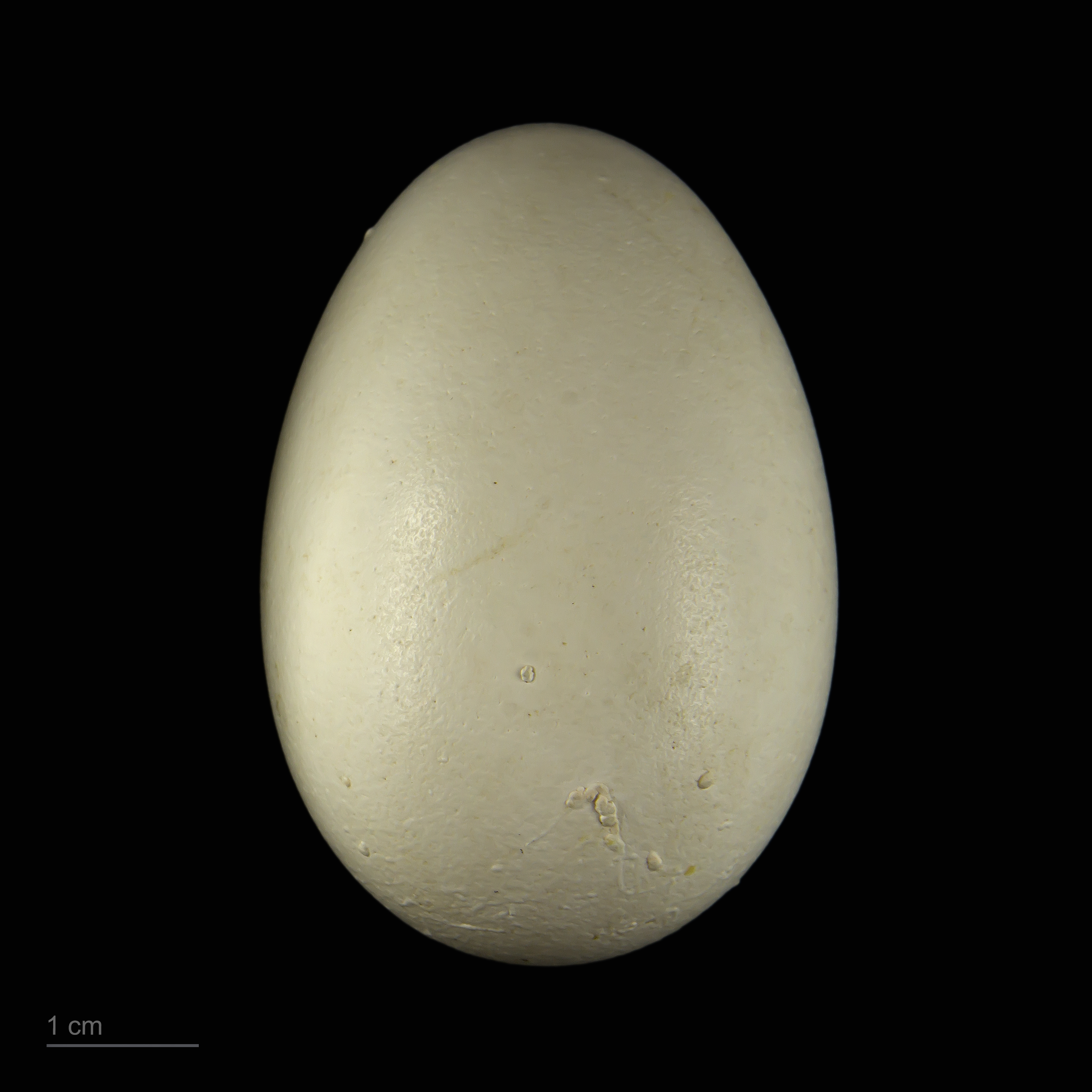
Egg - MHNT

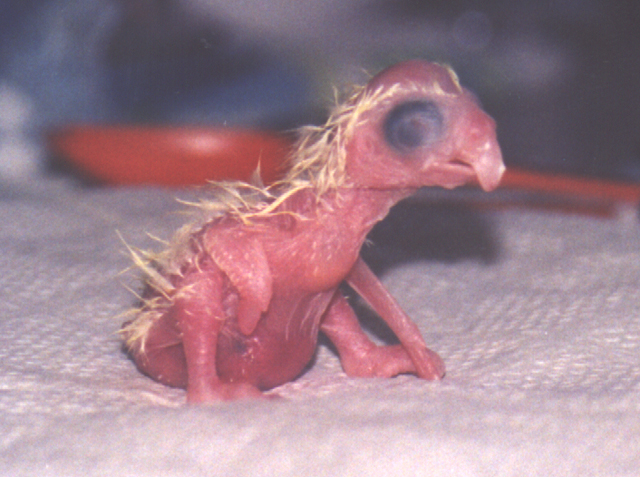
Newly hatched, still wet

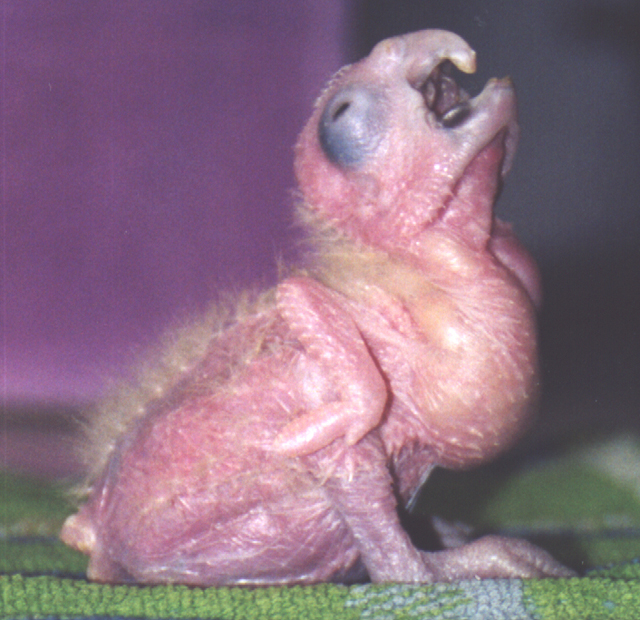
3 weeks old. Eyes first starting to open. Still has egg tooth. Full crop after being hand-fed.

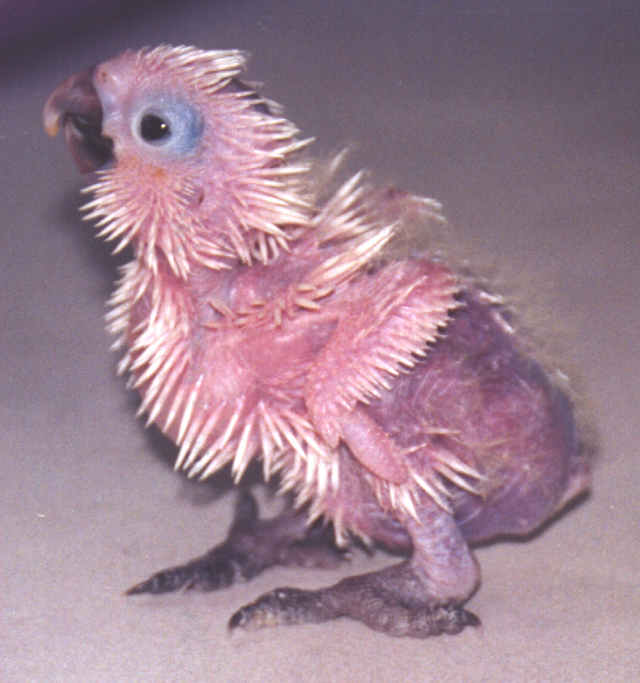
6 weeks old. Pin feathers developing. Egg tooth gone.

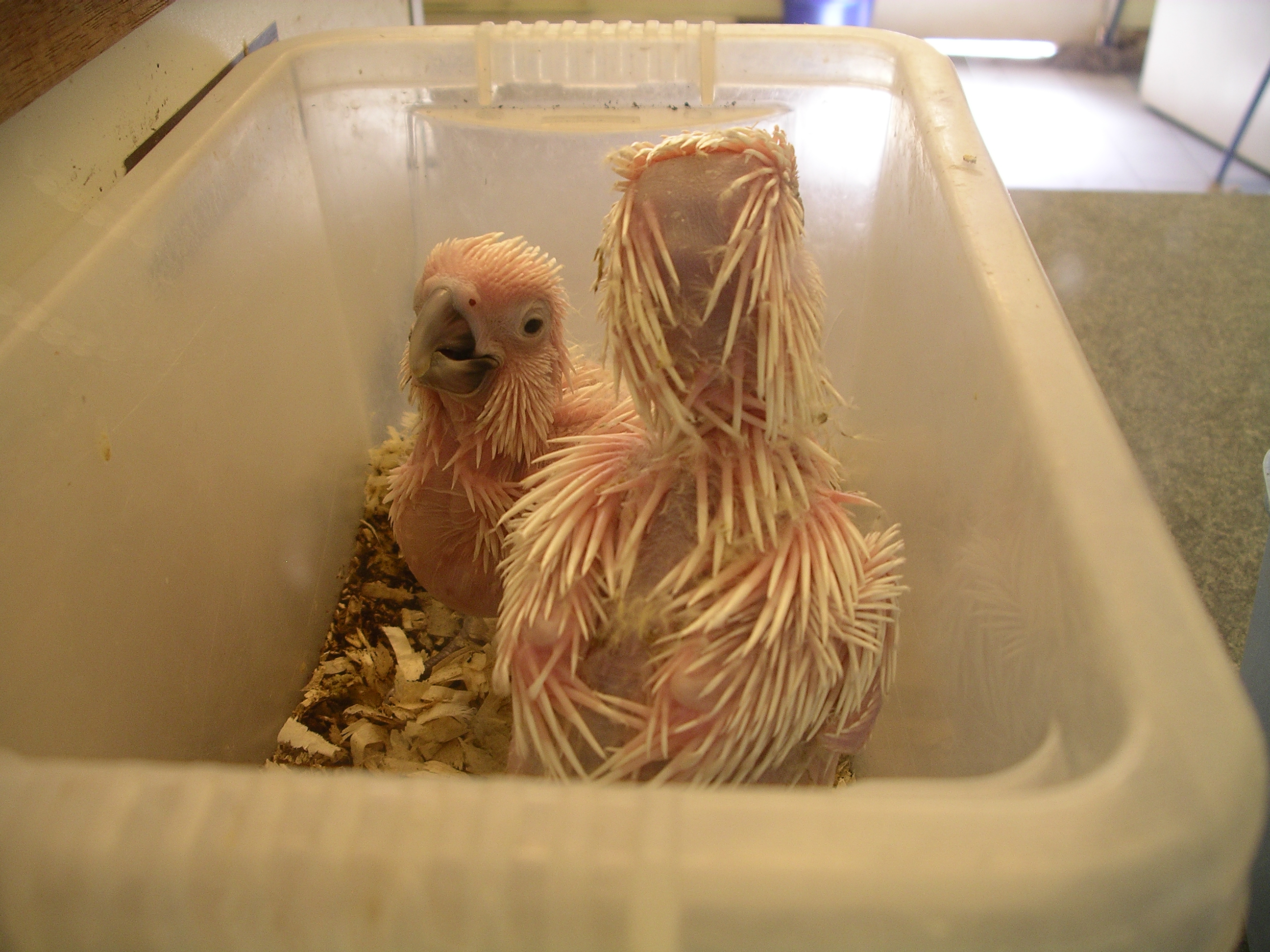
Hand reared chicks covered in pin feathers

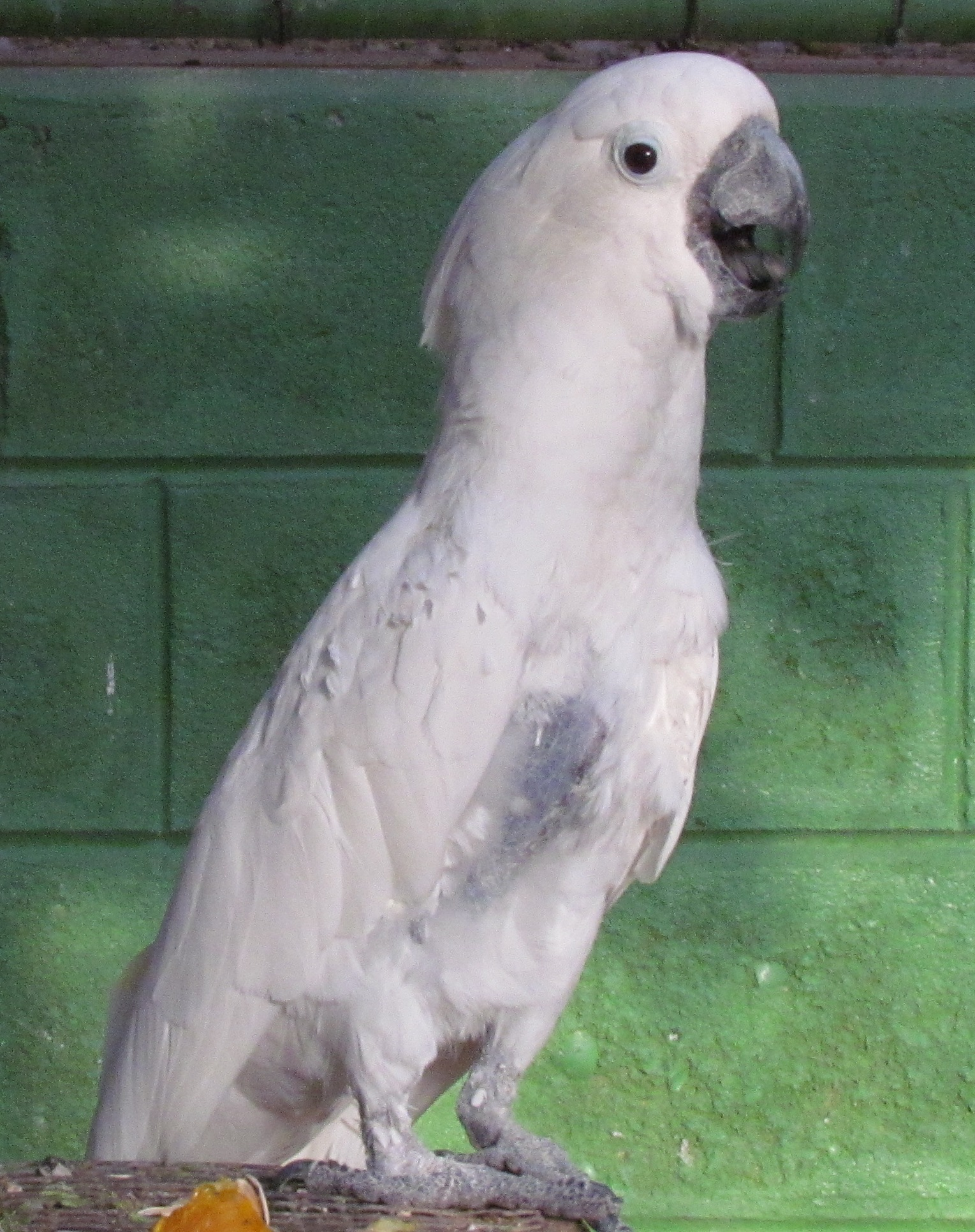
White cockatoo with a minor plucking problem.

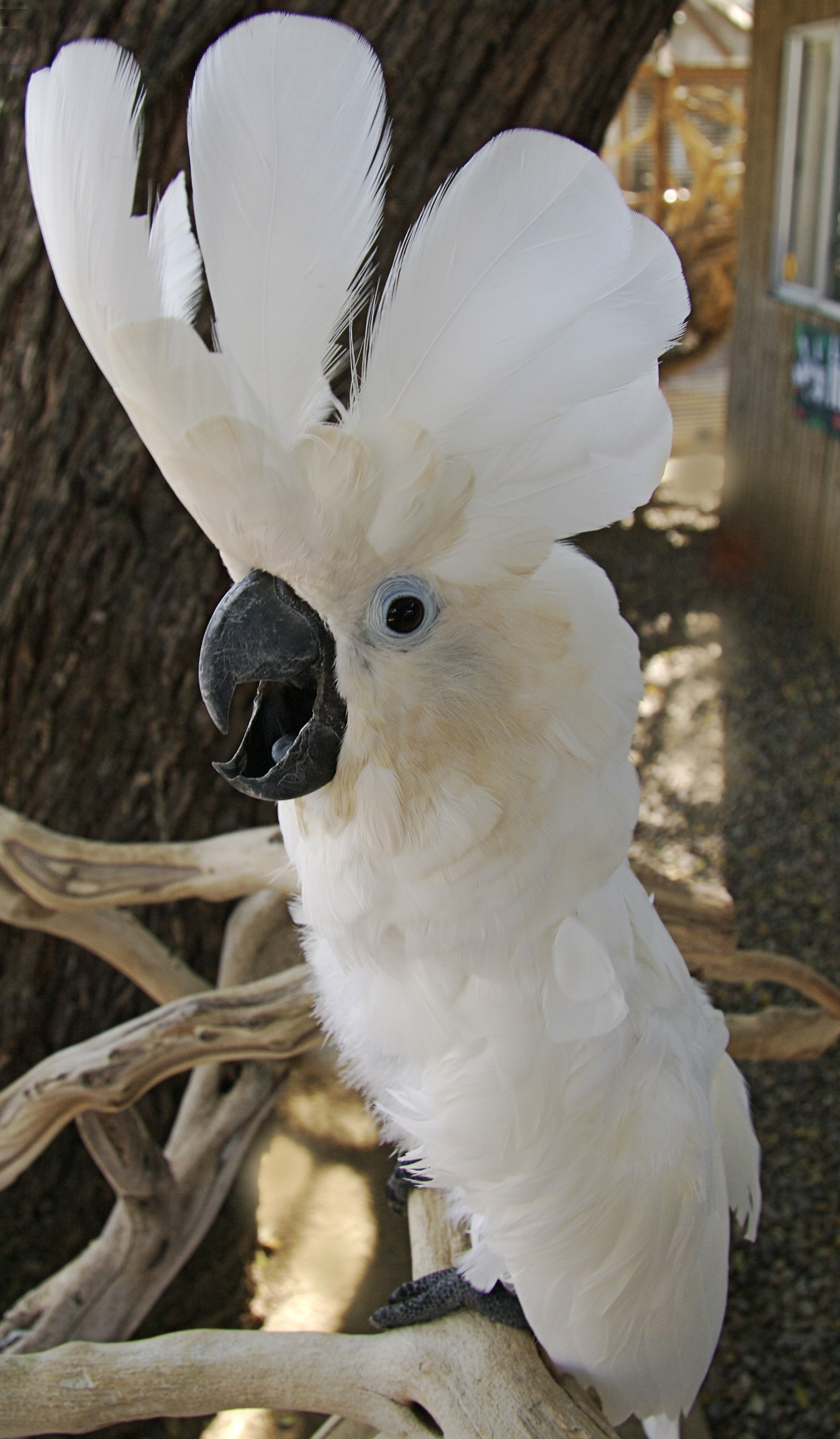
With crest extended

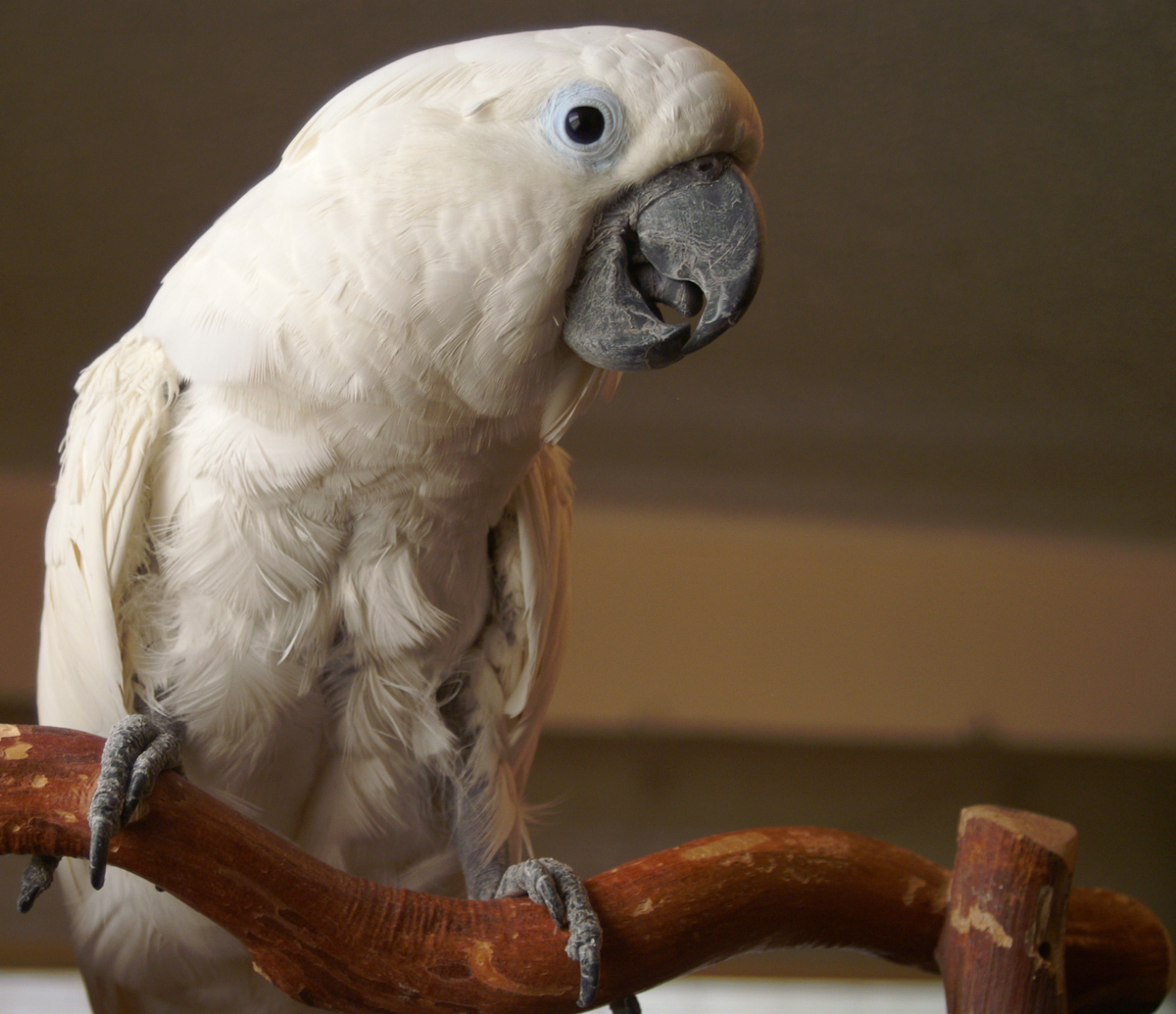
With crest retracted

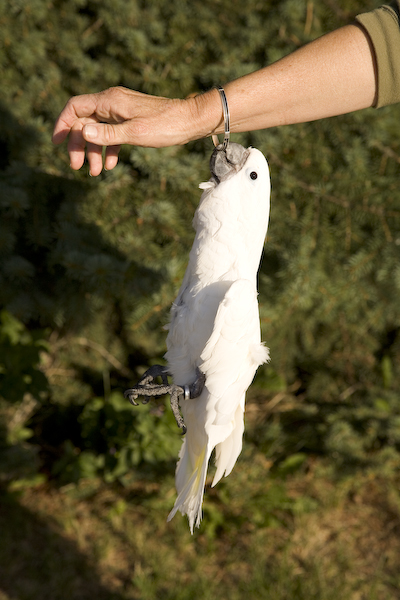
Hanging from a bracelet
