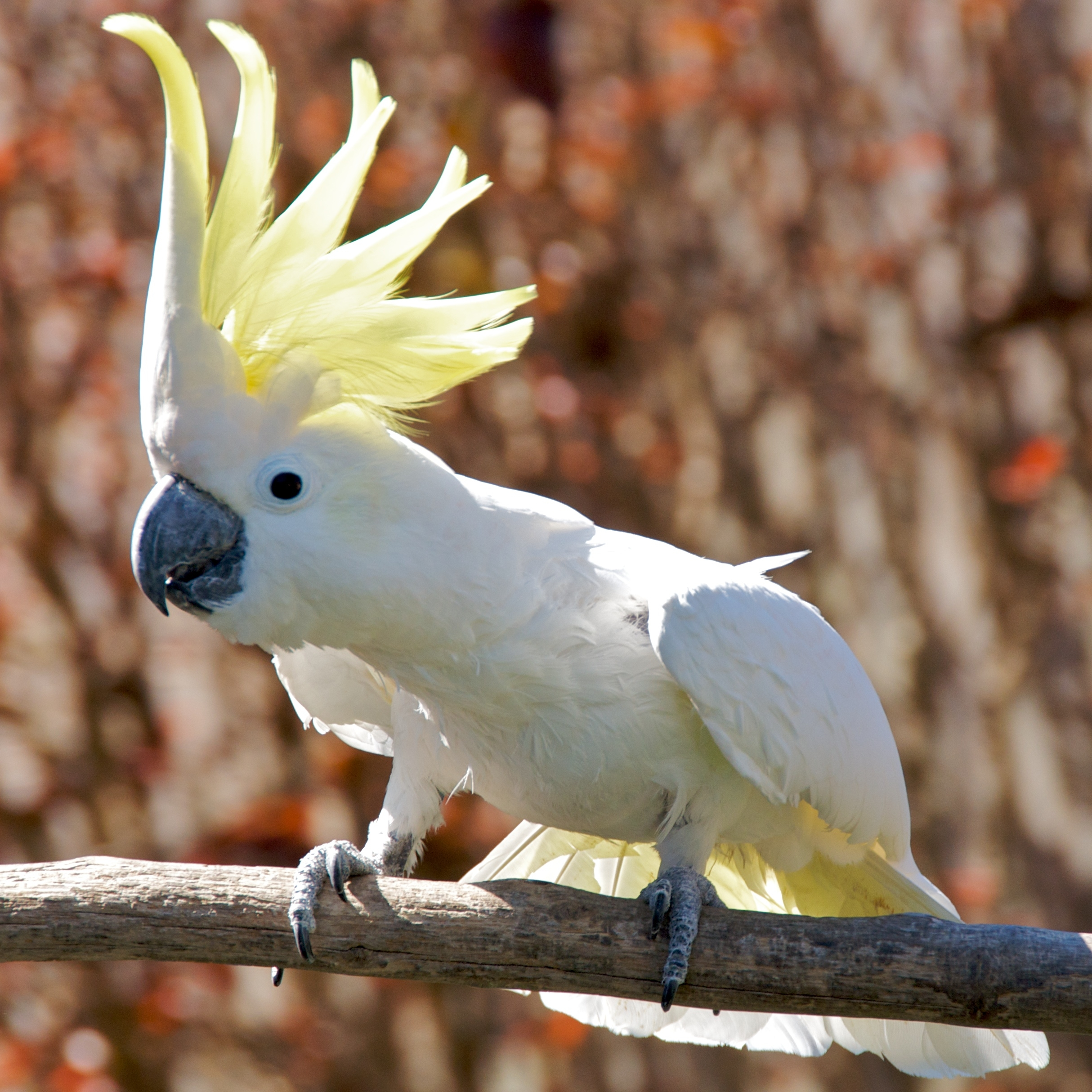
- Cacatua galerita

Scientific classification
- Kingdom: Animalia
- Phylum: Chordata
- Class: Aves
- Order: Psittaciformes
- Family: Cacatuidae
- Subfamily: Cacatuinae
- Genus: Cacatua; Vieillot, 1817

Type species
- Cacatua cristata = Psittacus albus Vieillot, 1817
- Cacatua distribution

= Cacatua =

Genus of birds

Cacatua is a genus of cockatoos known as great cockatoos found from the Philippines, Indonesia, Papua New Guinea, and Solomon Islands to Australia. Most birds in the genus exhibit very little sexual dimorphism. They have a comparatively large size, primarily white plumage (in some species tinged pinkish or yellow), an expressive crest, and a black (subgenus Cacatua) or pale (subgenus Licmetis) bill. Today, several species from this genus are considered threatened due to a combination of habitat loss and capture for the wild-bird trade, with the blue-eyed cockatoo considered vulnerable, Moluccan cockatoo, and umbrella cockatoo considered endangered, and the red-vented cockatoo, yellow-crested cockatoo and citron-crested cockatoo considered critically endangered.

== Taxonomy ==
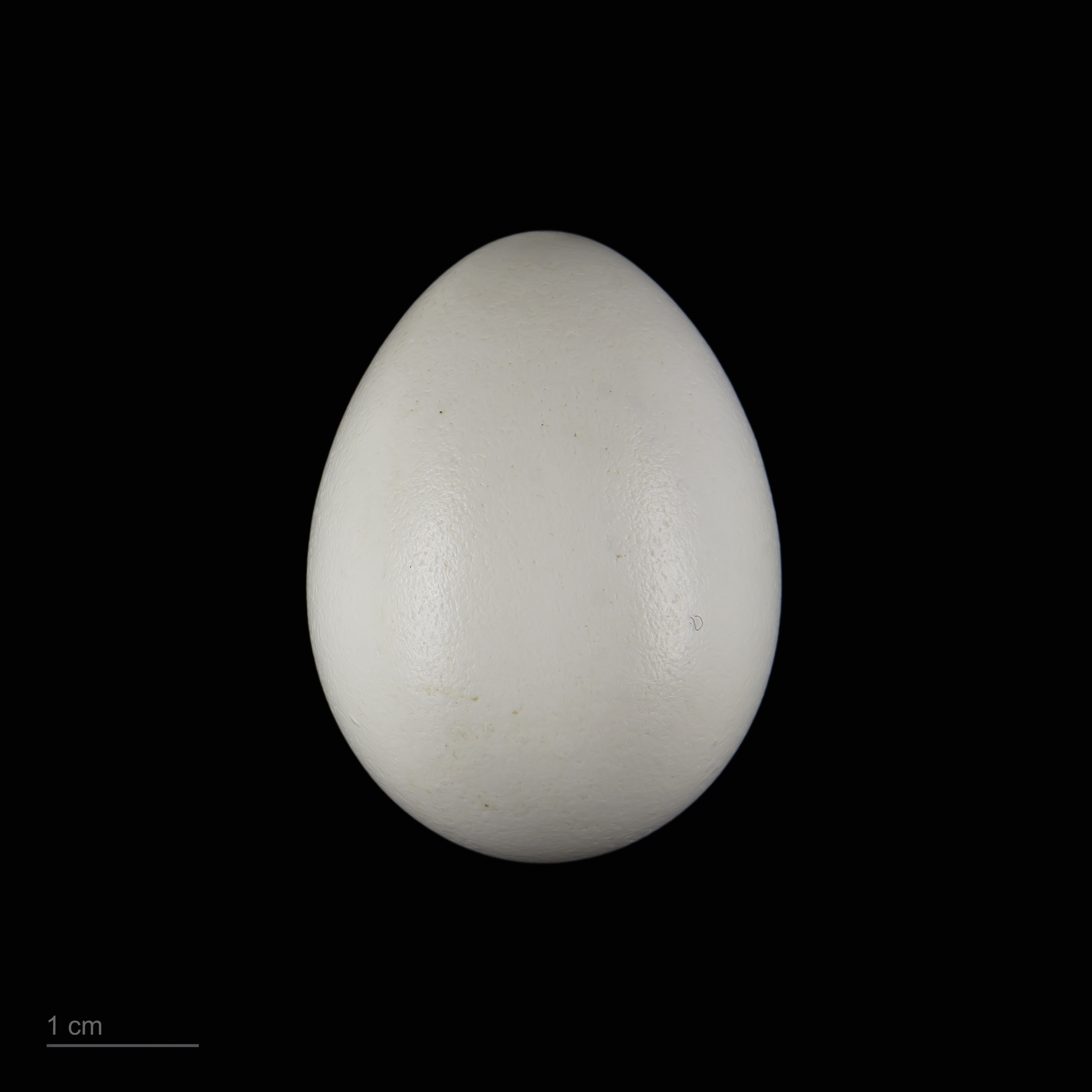
Cacatua sp - MHNT

Although the name Cacatua was used in 1760 by French zoologist Mathurin Jacques Brisson, he did not include it in his table of genera and Brisson is not recognised as the authority by the International Commission on Zoological Nomenclature (ICZN). The genus Kakatoe was introduced by Georges Cuvier in 1801 but this name has been suppressed by the ICZN and instead Louis Pierre Vieillot is recognised as introducing the genus Cacatua in 1817. The type species was designated as the white cockatoo by Tommaso Salvadori in 1891.

The name Cacatua is from the Malay language words Kakatuá and Kakak-tuá for the cockatoos.

== Evolution ==
During Eocene, approximatively 40.7 million years ago, the family Cacatuidae diverged from an ancient evolutionary lineage within parrots. It then began to diversify into several genus 27.9 million years ago. Among all genera, Cacatua is the largest, including 13 species. The evolutionary relationships of the species within the genus has been identified using morphological, behavioural, acoustic and genetic studies. As most Cacatua species are non-migratory and distributed across one region, it suggests modern species diversified after the break-up of Gondwana. The geographic isolation has played an important role in their evolutionary history and diversification.

== Habitat & Distribution ==
The genus Cacatua is native from the Australasian region. Species are distributed across Australia, New Guinea, Indonesia, the Philippines, and several islands of Wallacea and Melanesia. Habitat preferences change considerably between species; it varies from tropical rainforests and woodlands to open grasslands and savannas. Some have a broad geographic range, such as the Sulphur-crested Cockatoo (Cacatua galerita) that populate a wide range of wooded environments, including areas near human settlements. While others have more specialized habitat with individual island or group of islands such as the Blue-eyed cockatoo (Cacatua ophtalmica), who's endemic to New Britain, Papua New Guinea. This type of habitat makes them more sensitive to habitat loss and fragmentation.

== Behaviour ==
=== Diet ===
Specie of the genus are predominantly herbivorous. They feed on a variety of plants including; seeds, grains, fruits, berries, nuts, leaf buds, flowers, shoots, and roots. Some species also occasionally consume insects and their larvae. Their feeding habits vary according to species and habitat, with some foraging primarly in trees and others feeding on the ground.

=== Reproduction ===
Species of Cacatua generally monogamous, with males and females remaining together throughout the years. They build nests in tree-hollows and often return to the same nesting sites each year.

Eggs take from three to four weeks to hatch and the nestling period ranges from seven to fourteen weeks. The sexual maturity usually takes between two to five years.

=== Vocalization ===
They produce a variety of calls composed of harsh, mechanical and melodious sound. Cockatoos are known for their vocal learning abilities, which allow them to modify or imitate sounds. The acoustic signature of each species have been a tool to investigate evolutionary relationships and geographic variation within the genus.

=== Intelligence ===
Cacatuas are popular for their intelligence and problem-solving skills. Goffin's cockatoos (Cacatua goffiniana) in particular, have been studied for the ability to make and use tools. In captive individuals, studies have shown they can learn tool-related behaviour by watching other individuals. In the wild, some individuals have been observed making up wooden tools to extract seeds from fruits. Although tool use hasn't been observed in all species of the genus, they are among the few species that possess traits shared with tool-using primates; complex sociality, social transmission, prolonged parental care, and problem-solving skills.

== Conservation ==
Several species of Cacatua are threatened by habitat loss and pet trade, especially in Southeast Asia. On one hand, The citron-crested cockatoo(Cacatua citrinocristata), yellow-crested cockatoo (Cacatua sulphura), and red-vented cockatoo (Cacatua haematurogya) are classified as Critically Endangered (CR) under the IUCN Red List. On the other hand, in Australia, species distributed in Australia are classified as Least Concern (LC). While the conservation status of the genus varies from Least Concern to Critically Endangered among species (see species classification table), deforestation and changes in land use reduce their natural habitat and illegal trapping contribute to population declines.

=== Pet-trade ===
The Great Cockatoos are popular pets because of their exotic appearance, ability to imitate sounds, and complex behaviours. All of which, contribute to a high economic value and demand. Cockatoos are listed among the top ten traded species in Edan and Sumatran markets, Indonesia. To help threatened species, conservation organizations and international agreements, including the International Union for the Conservation of Nature (IUCN) and the Convention on International Trade in Endangered Species of Wild Fauna and Flora (CITES) play important roles in assessing conservation status and regulating international trade. The captive reproduction of Cockatoos has helped decrease pouching of Cacatua in their natural habitats.

== Species Classification ==
Subgenus	Image	Scientific name	Common name	Distribution	IUCN Red List
Cacatua - true white cockatoos		Cacatua sulphurea	Yellow-crested (or lesser sulphur-crested) cockatoo,	East Timor and Indonesia's islands of Sulawesi and the Lesser Sundas	Critically Endangered
Cacatua - true white cockatoos		Cacatua citrinocristata	Citron-crested cockatoo	Sumba in the Lesser Sunda Islands in Indonesia	Critically Endangered
Cacatua - true white cockatoos		Cacatua galerita	Sulphur-crested cockatoo	Australia, and New Guinea and some of the islands of Indonesia	Least Concern
Cacatua - true white cockatoos		Cacatua ophthalmica	Blue-eyed cockatoo	New Britain in Papua New Guinea	Vulnerable
Cacatua - true white cockatoos		Cacatua alba	White (or umbrella) cockatoo	Halmahera, Bacan, Ternate, Tidore, Kasiruta and Mandioli (Bacan group) in North Maluku, Indonesia	Endangered
Cacatua - true white cockatoos		Cacatua moluccensis	Salmon-crested (or Moluccan) cockatoo	Seram archipelago in eastern Indonesia	Endangered
Licmetis - corellas		Cacatua tenuirostris	Long-billed corella	Australia	Least Concern
Licmetis - corellas		Cacatua pastinator	Western corella	South-western Australia	Least Concern
Licmetis - corellas		Cacatua sanguinea	Little corella	Australia and southern New Guinea	Least Concern
Licmetis - corellas		Cacatua goffiniana	Tanimbar corella (or Goffin's cockatoo)	Yamdena, Larat and Selaru, all islands in the Tanimbar Islands archipelago in Indonesia	Near Threatened
Licmetis - corellas		Cacatua ducorpsii	Solomons corella (or Ducorps's cockatoo)	Solomon Islands archipelago	Least Concern
Licmetis - corellas		Cacatua haematuropygia	Red-vented (or Philippine) cockatoo	Philippines	Critically Endangered
Lophochroa - pink cockatoos		Cacatua leadbeateri	Pink (or Major Mitchell's/Leadbeater's) cockatoo	Interior and western Australia	Least Concern
