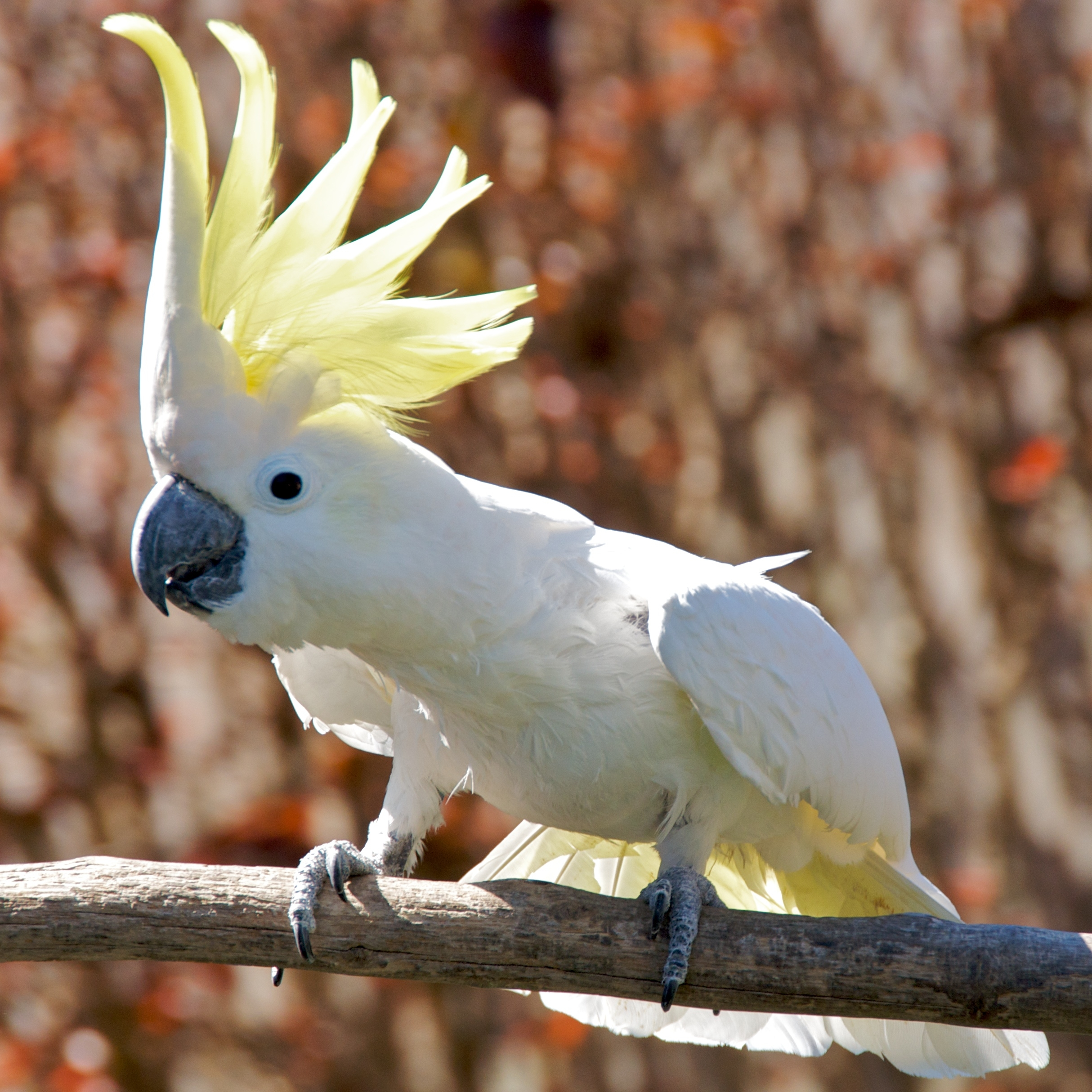
- Cacatua galerita

Scientific classification
- Kingdom: Animalia
- Phylum: Chordata
- Class: Aves
- Order: Psittaciformes
- Family: Cacatuidae
- Genus: Cacatua
- Subgenus: Cacatua; Vieillot, 1817

Species
- 6, see text

= Cacatua (Cacatua) =

Cacatua (Cacatua) Temporal range: Pleistocene - Present

Subgenus of birds

Cacatua is a subgenus of the white cockatoos (genus Cacatua). They are found in wooded habitats from Wallacea east to the Bismarck Archipelago and south to Australia. With the exception of the yellow-crested cockatoo, all are relatively large cockatoos with a total length of 45–55 cm (18–22 in). Their plumage is mainly white (tinged pinkish in the salmon-crested cockatoo), and the underwing and -tail have a yellowish tinge. Their crest is expressive and brightly coloured in most species. Unlike the members of the subgenus Licmetis, the members of the subgenus Cacatua have a black bill.

The sulphur-crested cockatoo is relatively widespread and can even be seen in suburban habitats in some parts of its range, but the remaining members of this subgenus all have relatively small distributions and are considered threatened by the IUCN due to a combination of habitat loss and capture for the wild bird trade.

== Species ==
- Yellow-crested (or lesser sulphur-crested) cockatoo, Cacatua (Cacatua) sulphurea
- Citron-crested cockatoo, Cacatua (Cacatua) citrinocristata
- Sulphur-crested cockatoo, Cacatua (Cacatua) galerita
- Blue-eyed cockatoo, Cacatua (Cacatua) ophthalmica
- White (or umbrella) cockatoo, Cacatua (Cacatua) alba
- Salmon-crested (or Moluccan) cockatoo, Cacatua (Cacatua) moluccensis
