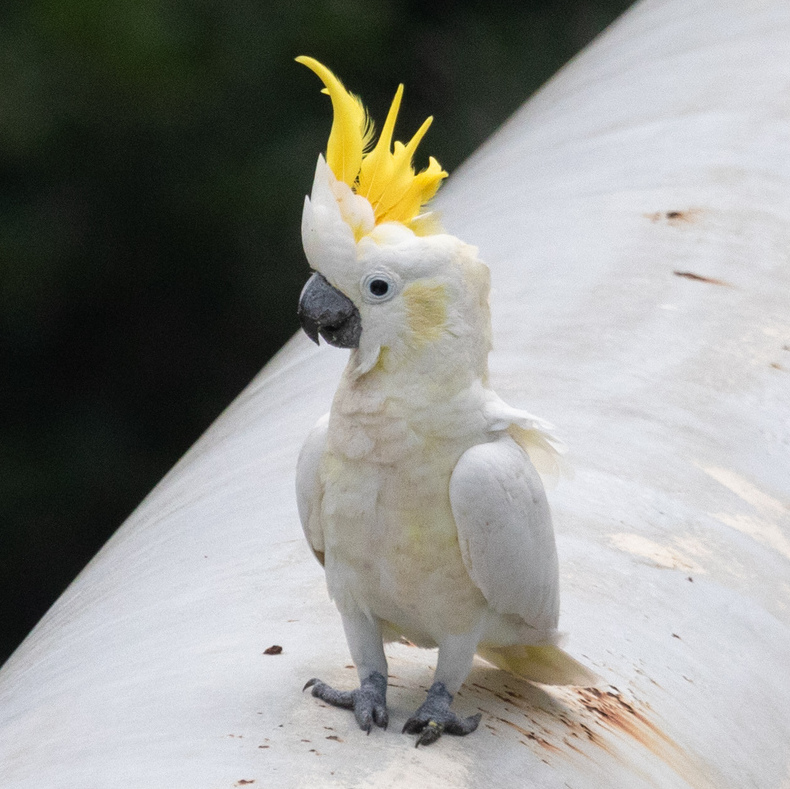
- In Hong Kong (feral population)

Conservation status
- Critically Endangered (IUCN 3.1)
- CITES Appendix I

Scientific classification
- Kingdom: Animalia
- Phylum: Chordata
- Class: Aves
- Order: Psittaciformes
- Family: Cacatuidae
- Genus: Cacatua
- Subgenus: Cacatua
- Species: C. sulphurea

Binomial name
- Cacatua sulphurea (Gmelin, JF, 1788)
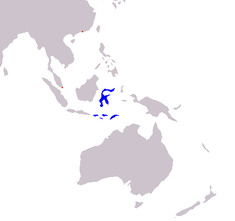
- Native (blue) and introduced (red) ranges of C. sulphurea

= Yellow-crested cockatoo =

Species of bird

The yellow-crested cockatoo (Cacatua sulphurea) also known as the lesser sulphur-crested cockatoo, is a medium-sized (about 34-cm-long) cockatoo with white plumage, bluish-white bare orbital skin, grey feet, a black bill, and a retractile yellow or orange crest. The sexes are similar.

The yellow-crested cockatoo is found in wooded and cultivated areas of East Timor and Indonesia's islands of Sulawesi and the Lesser Sundas. It is easily confused with the larger and more common sulphur-crested cockatoo, which has a more easterly distribution and can be distinguished by the lack of pale yellow coloring on its cheeks (although some sulphur-cresteds develop yellowish patches). Also, the yellow-crested cockatoo's crest is a brighter color, closer to orange. Endemic to Sumba, the citron-crested cockatoo, previously considered a subspecies of the yellow-crested cockatoo, is also similar, but presents with an orange crest.

The yellow-crested cockatoo's diet consists mainly of seeds, buds, fruits, nuts, and herbaceous plants.

== Taxonomy ==
In the 18th century, yellow-crested cockatoos were imported into Europe as pets and these birds were described by various naturalists. In 1738 English naturalist Eleazar Albin included a description and illustration of the "Cockatoo or White crested parrot" in his A Natural History of Birds based on a bird displayed at "The Tiger" tavern on Tower Hill in London. In 1760 the French zoologist Mathurin Jacques Brisson included "Le Kakatoes à hupe jaune" in his Onithologie based on a live bird that he had seen in Paris. Then in 1764, George Edwards included the "Lesser white cockatoo with a yellow crest" in his Gleanings of natural history from a pet bird kept at a home in Essex, and in 1779 French polymath Comte de Buffon included the bird in his Histoire Naturelle des Oiseaux.

When the German naturalist Johann Friedrich Gmelin revised and expanded Carl Linnaeus's Systema Naturae in 1788 he included the yellow-crested cockatoo based on the accounts of earlier naturalists. He placed it with the parrots in the genus Psittacus and coined the binomial name Psittacus sulphureus. The type locality is the island of Sulawesi, Indonesia. The yellow-crested cockatoo is now one of 11 species placed in the genus Cacatua that was introduced in 1817 by Louis Pierre Vieillot.

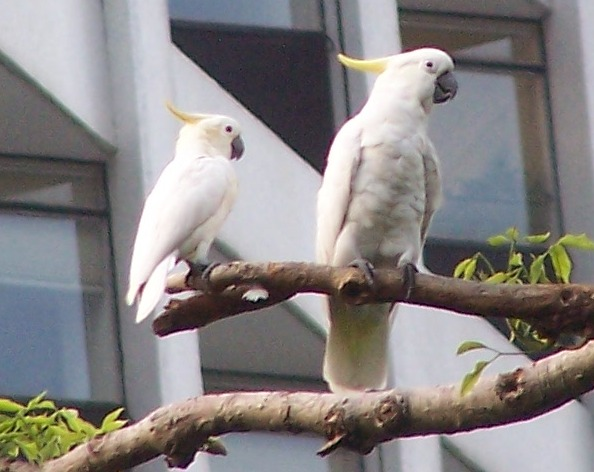
A yellow-crested cockatoo (left) and a sulphur-crested cockatoo in a Hong Kong park

=== Subspecies ===
According to the International Ornithological Congress, 5 subspecies are recognized:

- C. s. sulphurea (nominate subspecies) (Gmelin, JF, 1788) – Sulawesi and nearby islands (Muna and Buton)
- C. s. abbotti (Abbott's yellow-crested cockatoo or simply known as Abbott's cockatoo, locally: Beka) (Oberholser, 1917) – Masakambing Island
- C. s. djampeana Hartert, E, 1897 – Tanah Jampea and Tukangbesi Islands
- C. s. occidentalis Hartert, E, 1898 – Western and central Lesser Sundas (Lombok, Sumbawa, Komodo, Padar, Rinca, Flores, Pantar and Alor)
- C. s. parvula (Timor yellow-crested cockatoo) (Bonaparte, 1850) – Central Lesser Sundas (Rote, Semau, and Timor)

Previously, only 4 of these were recognized, but djampeana and occidentalis were recognized in 2022 based on a 2014 phylogenetic study. The subspecies paulandrewi, thought to be endemic to the Tukangbesi Islands and also recognized in the 2014 study, is not recognized by the IOC.

Until 2023, the citron-crested cockatoo (Cacatua citrinocristata) was considered by the IOC to be a subspecies of yellow-crested cockatoo.

== Breeding ==
The yellow-crested cockatoo nests in tree cavities. The eggs are white and usually two in a clutch. The incubation is shared by both parents. The eggs are incubated for about 28 days and the chicks leave the nest about 75 days after hatching.

== Status and conservation ==
The yellow-crested cockatoo is critically endangered. Numbers have declined dramatically due to illegal trapping for the cage-bird trade. Between 1980 and 1992, over 100,000 of these birds were legally exported from Indonesia, yet a German proposal submitted to CITES to move it to Appendix I was not approved. It has since been moved to Appendix I. The current population is estimated at fewer than 2,500 individuals and is thought to be declining in number.

The subspecies C. s. abbotti is found only on the island of Masakambing. Its population on this tiny island (about 5 km^{2} or 1.9 mi^{2}) had fallen to 10 as of June and July 2008. The decline results from trapping and logging, especially of mangroves (Avicennia apiculata) and kapok trees.

Several national parks are their habitat, including Rawa Aopa Watumohai National Park on Sulawesi, Komodo National Park on Komodo Island, the national parks of Manupeu Tanah Daru and Laiwangi Wanggameti on Sumba, and the Nino Konis Santana National Park in East Timor (Timor-Leste).

== Introduced population ==
An introduced population of these birds is found in Hong Kong. Hong Kong's feral population is estimated to be around 200, 10% of the total wild population. They are a common sight across the densely populated area on both sides of the harbour, easily spotted in the woods and public parks in the north and west of Hong Kong Island. The large group has developed from some caged birds that have been released into the Hong Kong area over many years. An often repeated story is that Hong Kong Governor Sir Mark Aitchison Young released the Government House's entire bird collection – including a large number of yellow-crested cockatoos – hours before surrendering Hong Kong to Japanese troops in December 1941. Historians and conservation biologists in Hong Kong have found no evidence to corroborate this story, and believe that Hong Kong's yellow-crested cockatoo population is made up of escaped pets. The earliest record of an escaped yellow-crested cockatoo pet comes from 1959.

== See also ==
- Koki (cockatoo)
