= Koki (cockatoo) =

Cockatoo owned by Josip Broz Tito

- Species: Yellow-crested cockatoo
- Sex: Male
- Born: c. 1960
- Known for: Josip Broz Tito's favourite parrot
- Residence: Brijuni Zoo

Koki (hatched c. 1960) is a yellow-crested cockatoo that was owned by Yugoslav leader Josip Broz Tito and kept at his coastal retreat on the Brijuni islands, in western Croatia.

From 1949 until his death in 1980, the Brijuni islands served as Tito's official summer residence. In addition to a wide array of world leaders, such as Fidel Castro, Yasser Arafat, Muammar Gaddafi, Indira Gandhi and Queen Elizabeth II, Tito hosted numerous international celebrities on the islands, including Sophia Loren, Elizabeth Taylor and Richard Burton, Josephine Baker and Gina Lollobrigida. Koki came into Tito's possession in the early 1970s. He belongs to larger species of parrots which are characterized by a crest on their heads and a stocky posture. They can reach up to 50 centimetres (20 in) in height, and have been described as "a very intelligent, social and amiable bird species that likes bathing". Koki quickly became Tito's favourite parrot. He was a regular fixture at the aging Yugoslav leader's private parties, and with time, "began to mimic his master's colorful peasant vocabulary." One of the phrases he is known to utter is Volim te, Sophia ("I love you, Sophia"), which he presumably learned when Tito was visited by Sophia Loren. In 1977, Tito gifted Koki to his granddaughter Saša for her ninth birthday.

Decades after Tito's death, Koki continues to live what has been described as a "pampered life". He has been known to want to shake guests' hands and has had his picture taken with almost all notable visitors to the islands, including Princess Caroline of Monaco and the actor John Malkovich. Koki has also been known to swear at visitors, as well as to squawk, "Tito! Tito! Tito!" According to his attendant, Koki "usually only talks to women. If men go near his cage, he gets jealous and tries to bite them." A sign on Koki's cage warns visitors that while he may utter "many friendly phrases", he is also in the habit of uttering "those which we kindly ask you not to take personally". "If Koki had a bigger vocabulary," a journalist writing for The Economist quipped, "he would doubtless enjoy revealing Croatia's darkest state secrets, which he has surely overheard."
