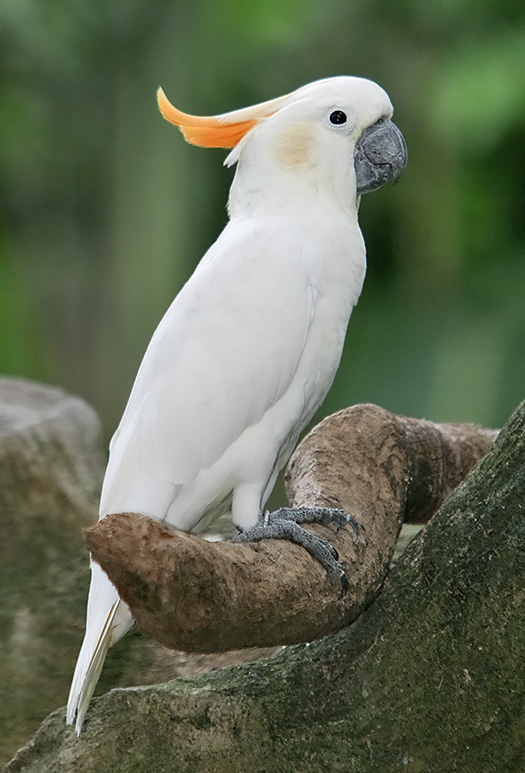
- Cock
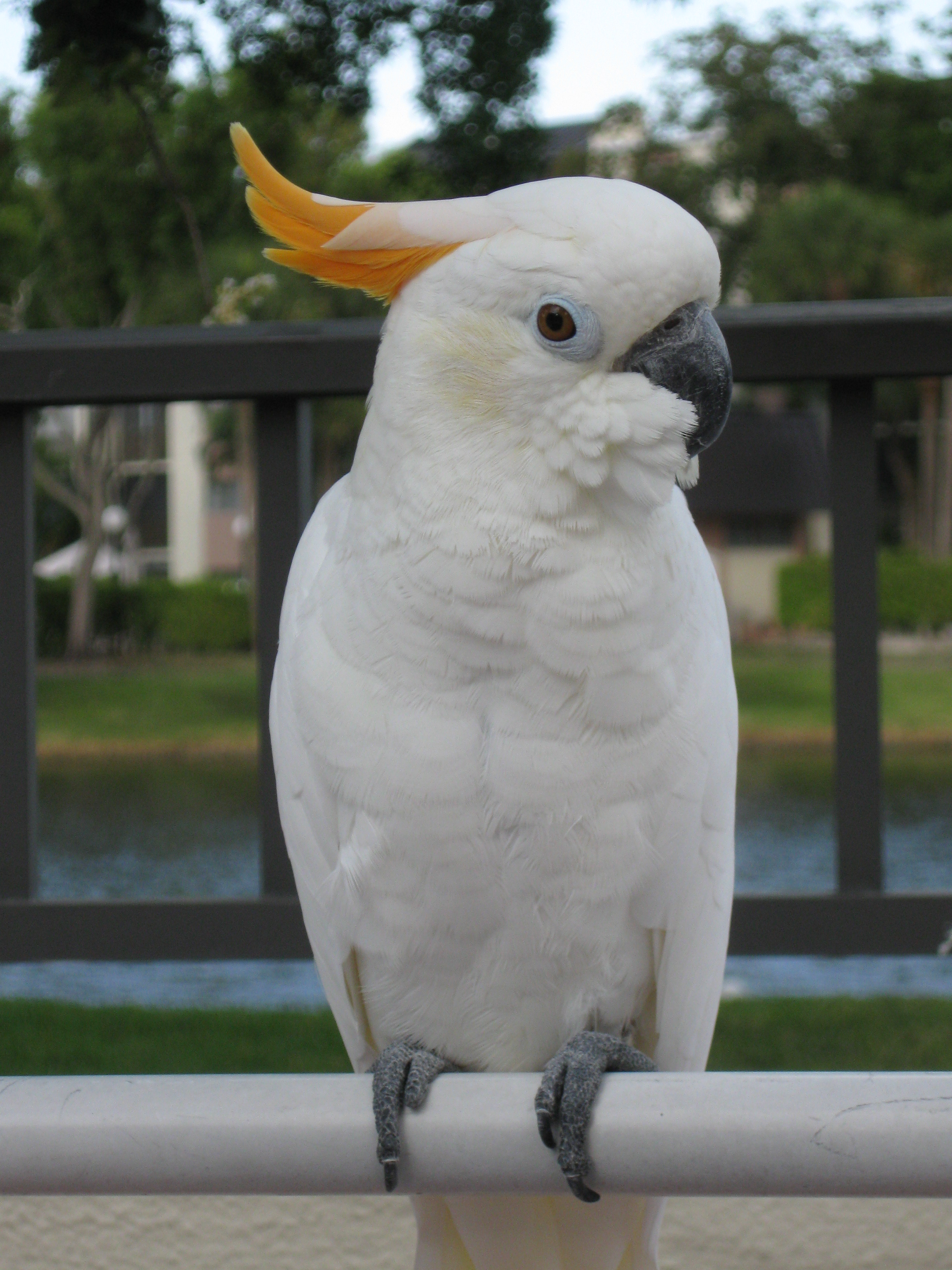
- Hen

Conservation status
- Critically Endangered (IUCN 3.1)

Scientific classification
- Kingdom: Animalia
- Phylum: Chordata
- Class: Aves
- Order: Psittaciformes
- Family: Cacatuidae
- Genus: Cacatua
- Subgenus: Cacatua
- Species: C. citrinocristata

Binomial name
- Cacatua citrinocristata (Fraser, 1844)

Synonyms
- Cacatua sulphurea citrinocristata

= Citron-crested cockatoo =

Subspecies of bird

The citron-crested cockatoo (Cacatua citrinocristata) is a medium-sized cockatoo with an orange crest, dark grey beak, pale orange ear patches, and strong feet and claws. The underside of the larger wing and tail feathers has a pale yellow color. The eyelid color is a very light blue. Both sexes are similar. Females have a copper colored eye where as the male has a very dark black eye.

They are endemic to Sumba in the Lesser Sunda Islands in Indonesia. The diet consists mainly of seeds, buds, fruits, nuts and herbaceous plants.

In 2022, Birdlife International recognized the citron-crested cockatoo as a separate species, Cacatua citrinocristata, assessed as Critically Endangered, while the International Ornithological Congress designated it to be a species in 2023.

== Conservation status ==
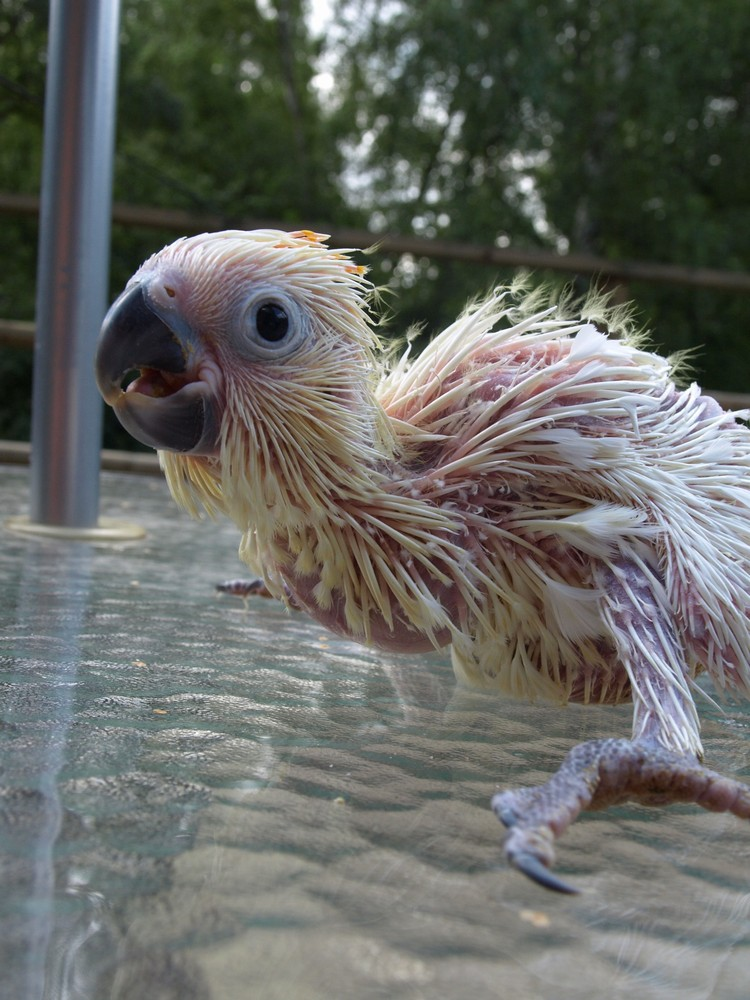
Chick at Děčín Zoo, Czech Republic

The citron-crested cockatoo is a critically endangered bird whose population has declined due to habitat loss and illegal trapping for the cage-bird trade. A 1993 survey of Sumba estimated the species' numbers at less than 2,000 individuals. By 2012, the estimate had dropped to 563, and as of 2019 the population numbers are estimated to be 1,200-2,000 individuals with 800-1,320 mature individuals. It is listed in appendix I of the CITES list. Consequently, international trade is strongly regulated and trade in wild caught citron-crested cockatoos is illegal.
