= Crest (feathers) =

Avian plumage

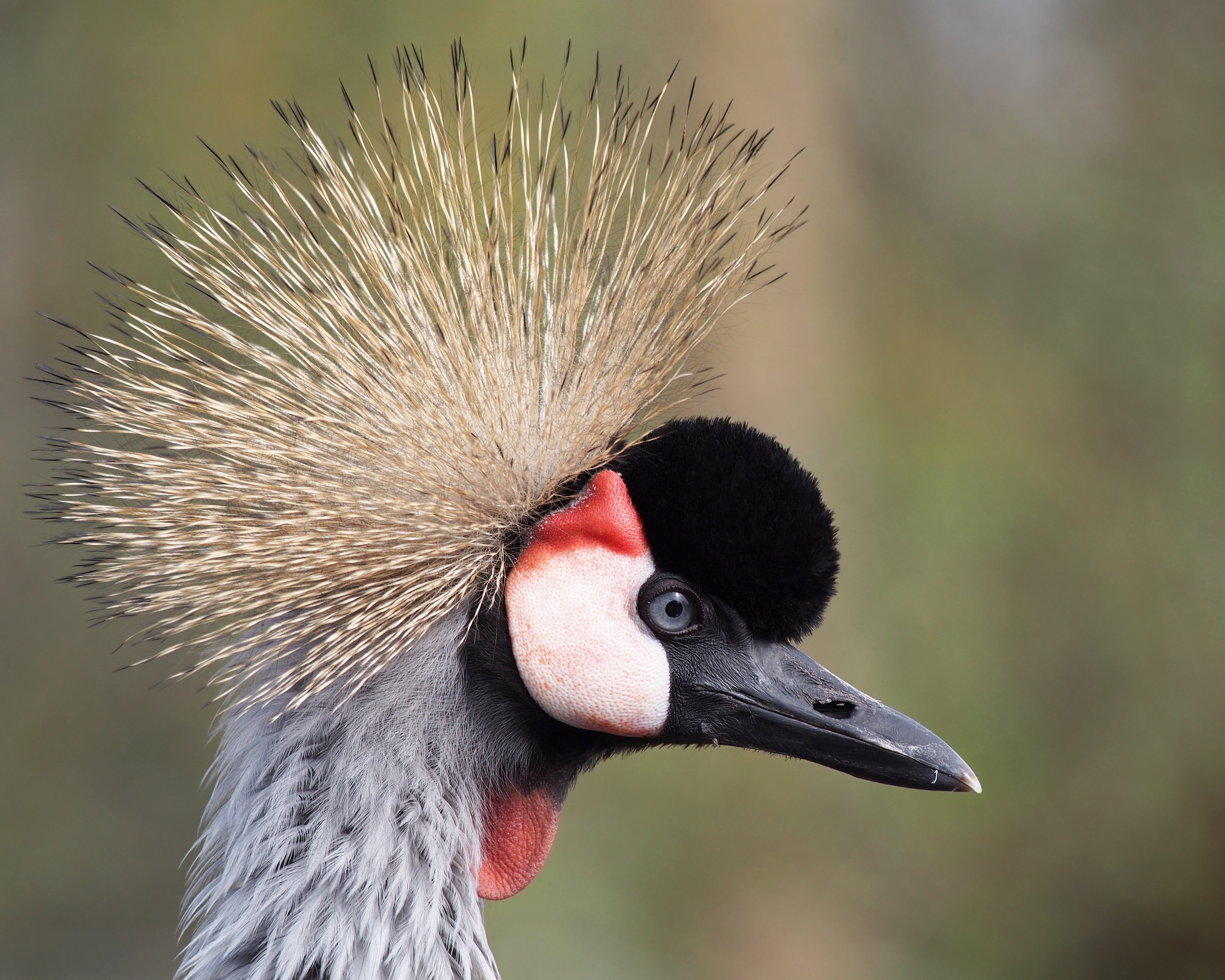
The grey crowned crane – an example of a crested bird species

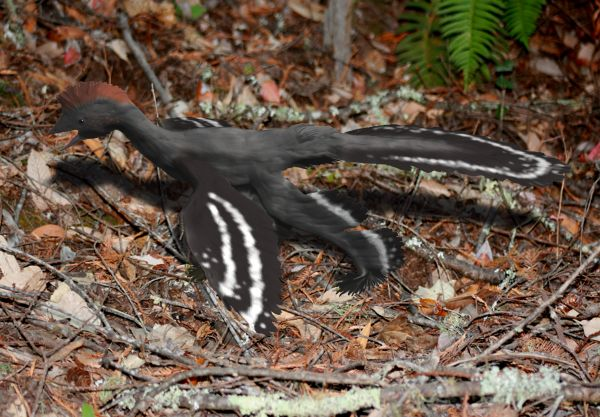
A restoration of the dinosaur Anchiornis, showing the crest of feathers on its head

The crest is a prominent feature exhibited by several bird species on their heads. It is distinct from features such as casques and cockscombs – sometimes erroneously referred to as "crests", which are bony and fleshy structures respectively.

The crest is made up of semiplume feathers: a long rachis with barbs on either side. These are plumulaceous feathers, meaning that they are soft and bendable. In birds, these semiplumes are common along the head, neck, and upper back, and may be used for buoyancy and sensing vibrations.

Crests on birds are generally used for display purposes. Cockatoos (a family that also includes corellas and the cockatiel) are part of the parrot family Cacatuidae found in Australia, the Bismarck Archipelago and the Philippines, and are probably the most recognizable birds to feature crests. Cockatoos and cockatiels possess crests which may be raised or lowered at will. Their crests are used to communicate with fellow members of their species, or as a form of defense to frighten away other species that approach too closely, making the bird appear larger when the crest is suddenly and unexpectedly raised.

Crests can be recumbent or recursive, depending on the species. The recumbent crest has feathers that are straight and lie down essentially flat on the head until the bird fans them out to where they stand up. The white cockatoo, for example, possesses a recumbent crest. The recursive crest is noticeable even when it is not fanned out because it features feathers, that, when lying down, curve upward at the tips, and when standing up, often bend slightly forward toward the front of the head. Many recursive crests also feature brilliant colors. The sulphur-crested cockatoo has a recursive crest, and the Major Mitchell's cockatoo (also known as the Leadbeater's cockatoo) possesses a prominent recursive crest. Some birds, like the galah, or rose-breasted cockatoo, have modified crests, which has features of both recumbent and recursive types.

Many domesticated bird species have crest feathers. These structures are known to have two origins: selective breeding or mutations. Crest feathers in domestic birds include a wide range of variations in form across species. The underlying molecular and genetic mechanisms that are responsible for crest feather formation in domesticated bird species are not well understood. As such, crest feathers are widely studied in morphological research and other related biological disciplines, particularly concerning domesticated species.

== Gallery ==
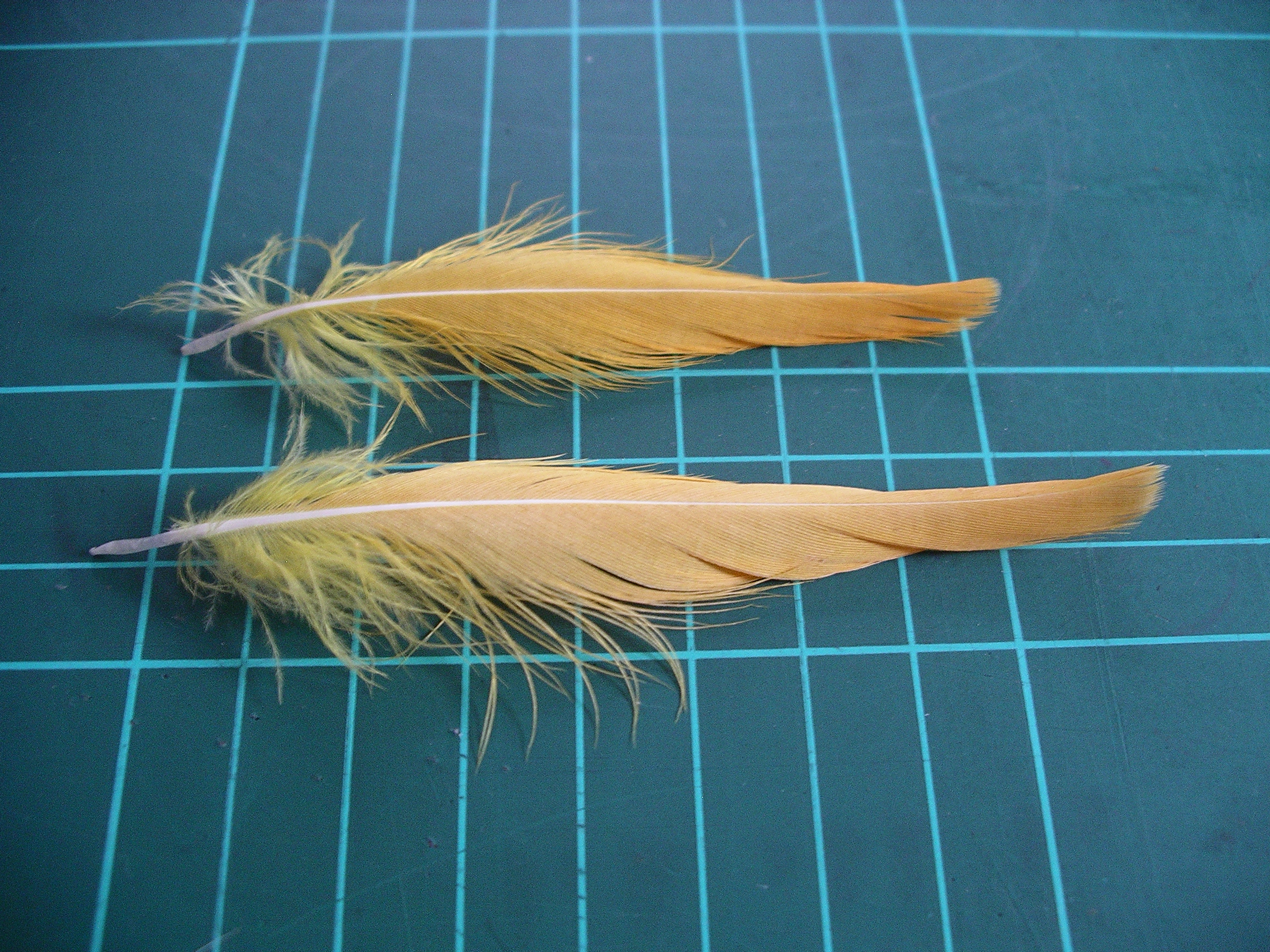
Citron-crested cockatoo (Cacatua citrinocristata) crest feathers (on 1 cm grid)

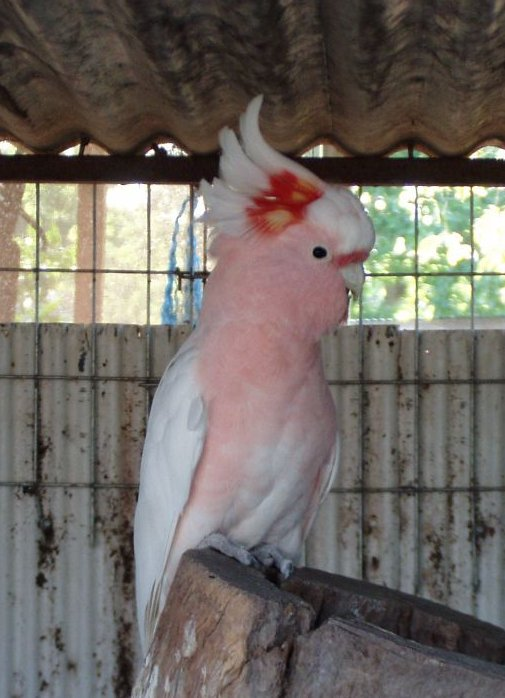
Major Mitchell's cockatoo (Cacatua leadbeateri)

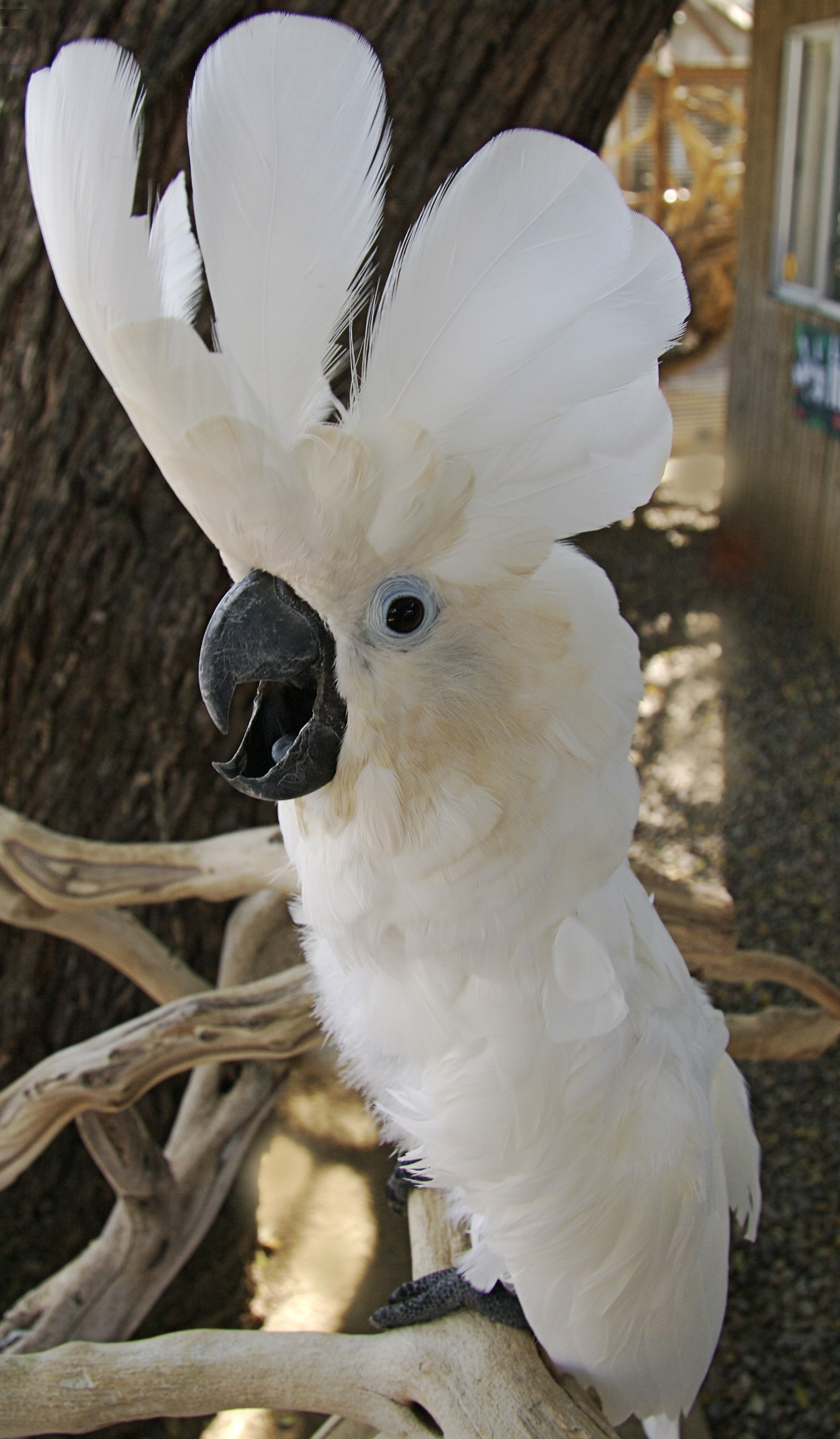
Umbrella cockatoo (Cacatua alba) with raised crest

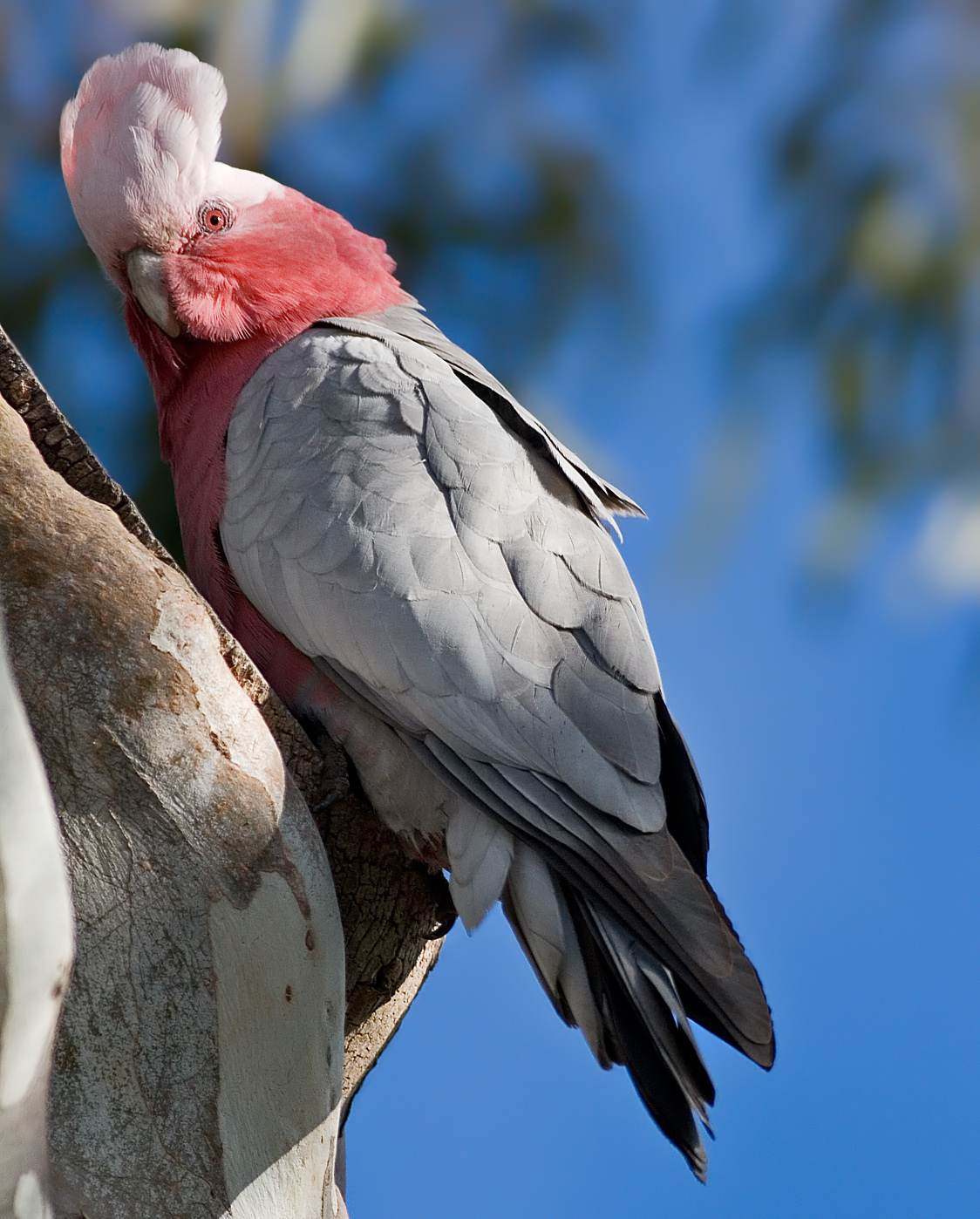
Female galah (Eolophus roseicapilla) with raised crest

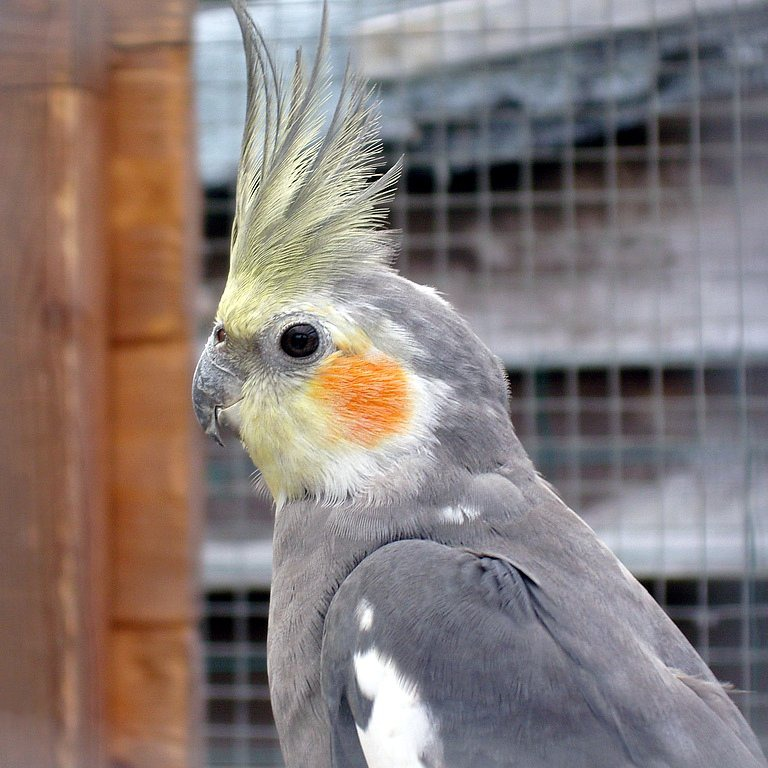
Cockatiel (Nymphicus hollandicus)

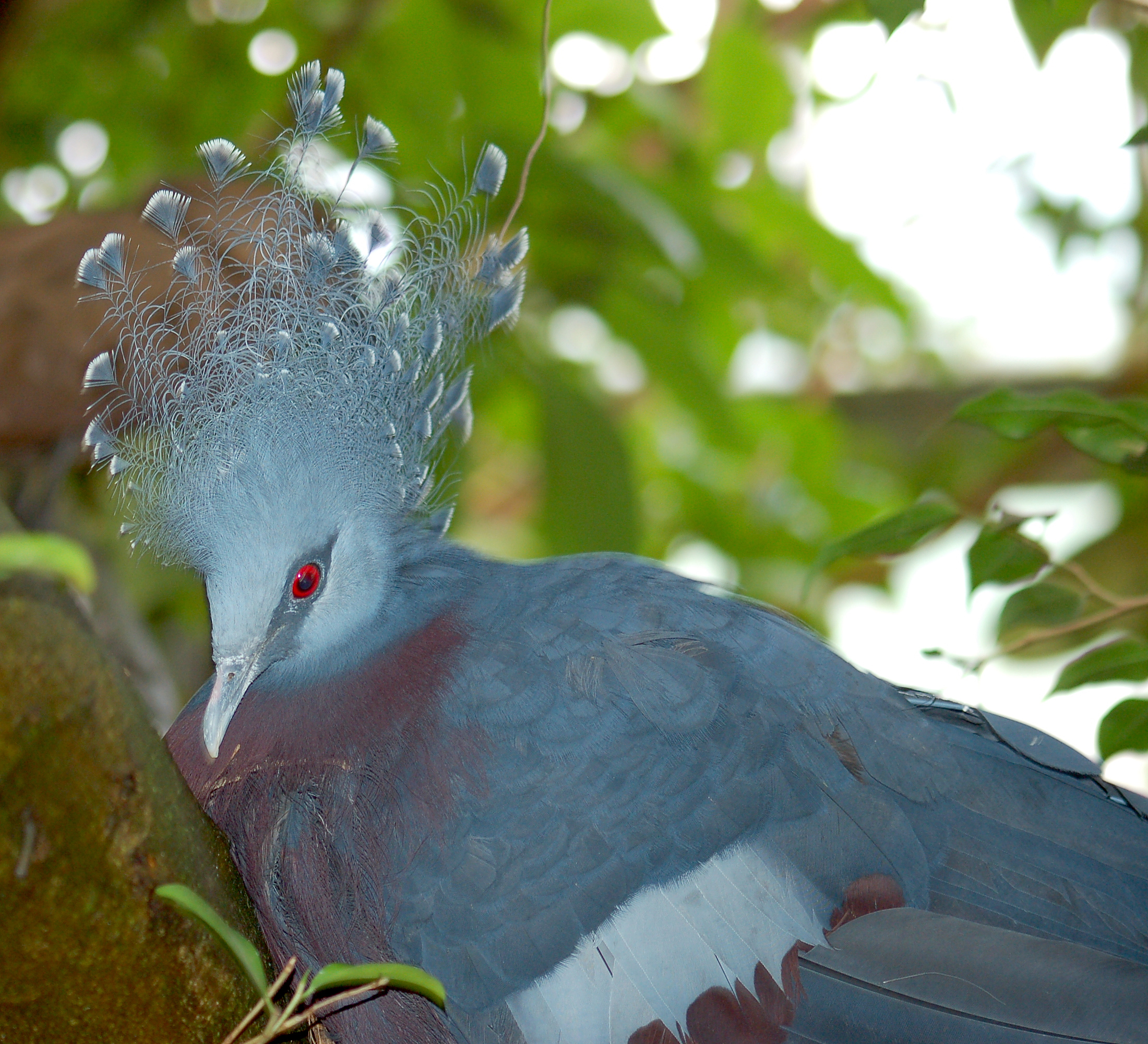
Victoria crowned pigeon (Goura victoria)

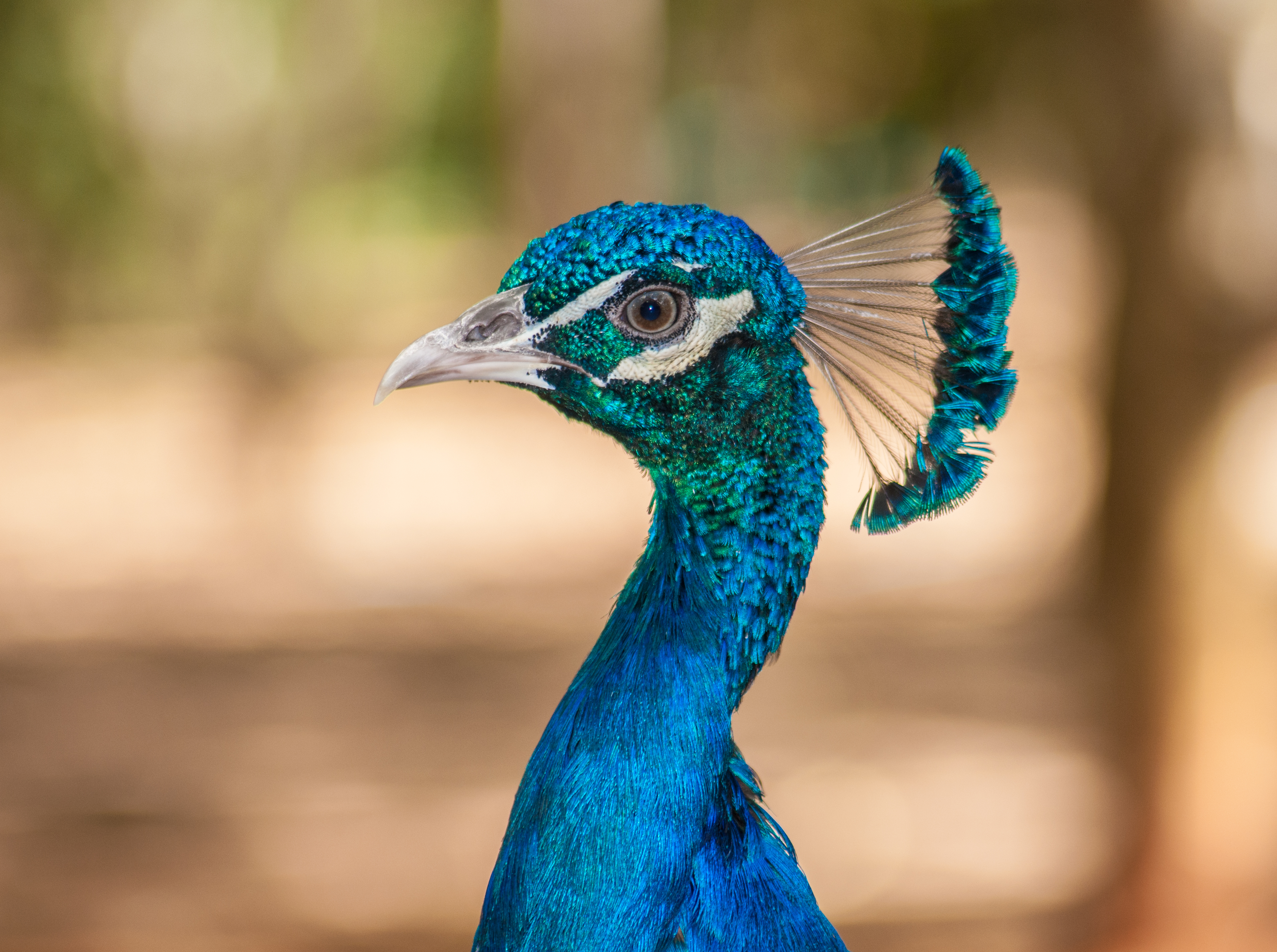
Indian peacock (Pavo cristatus)

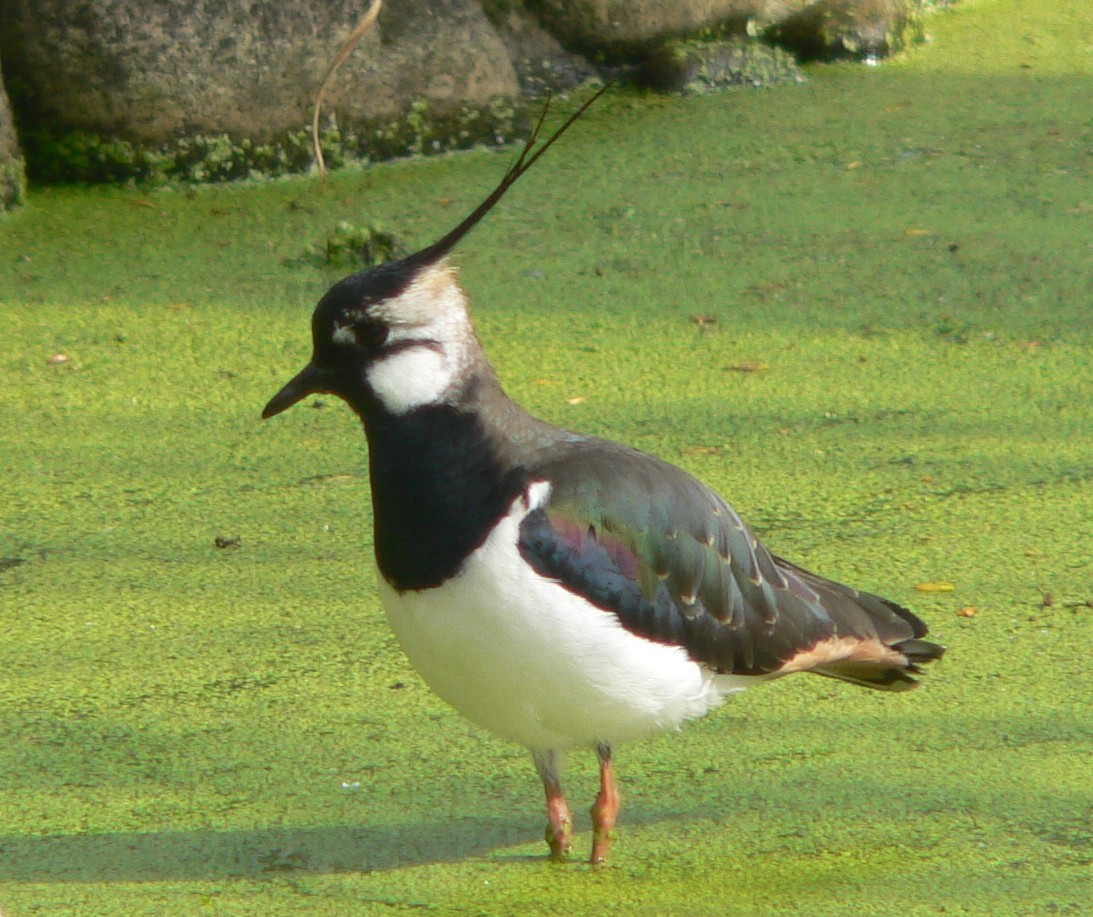
Northern lapwing (Vanellus vanellus)

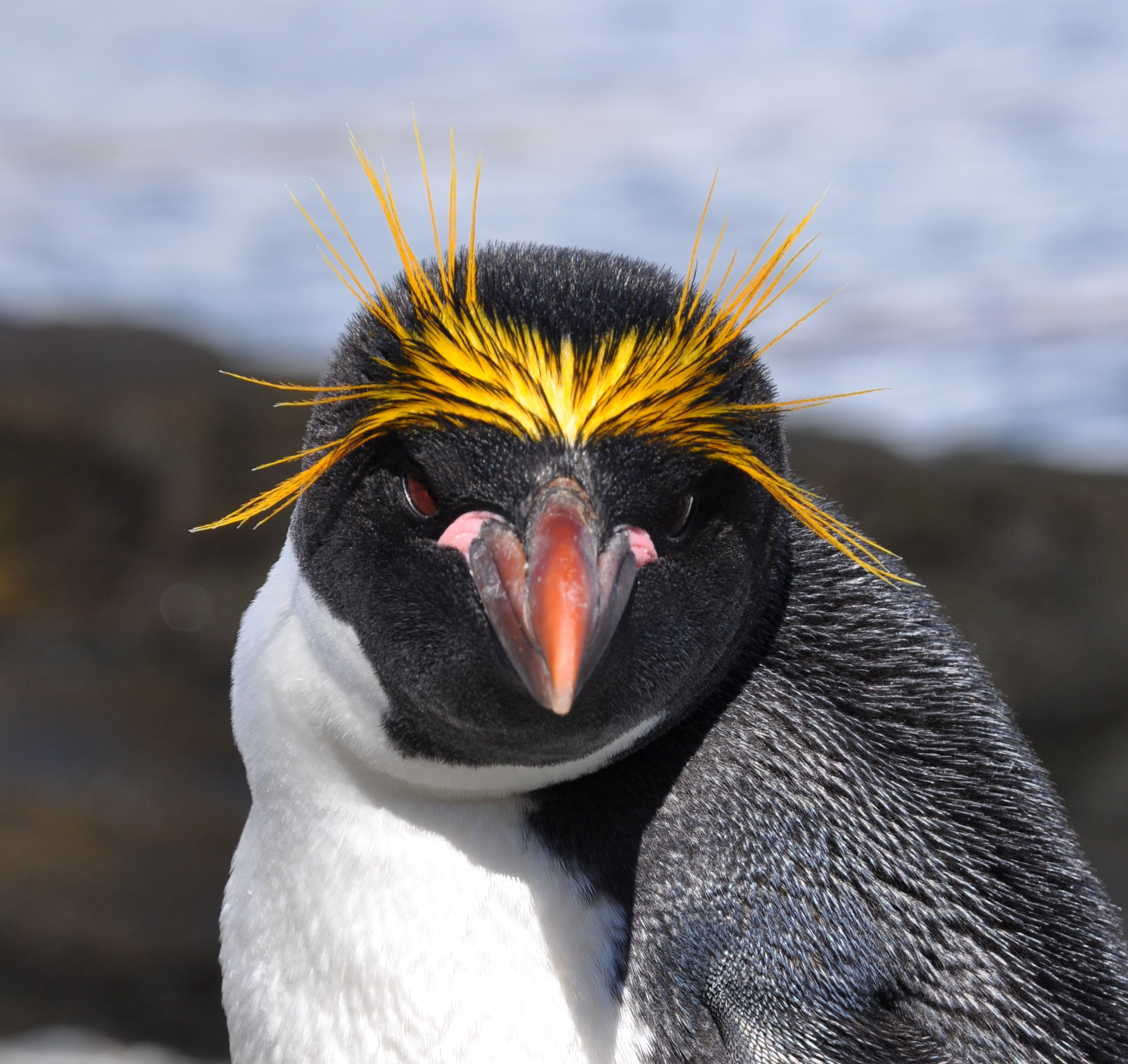
Macaroni penguin (Eudyptes chrysolophus)

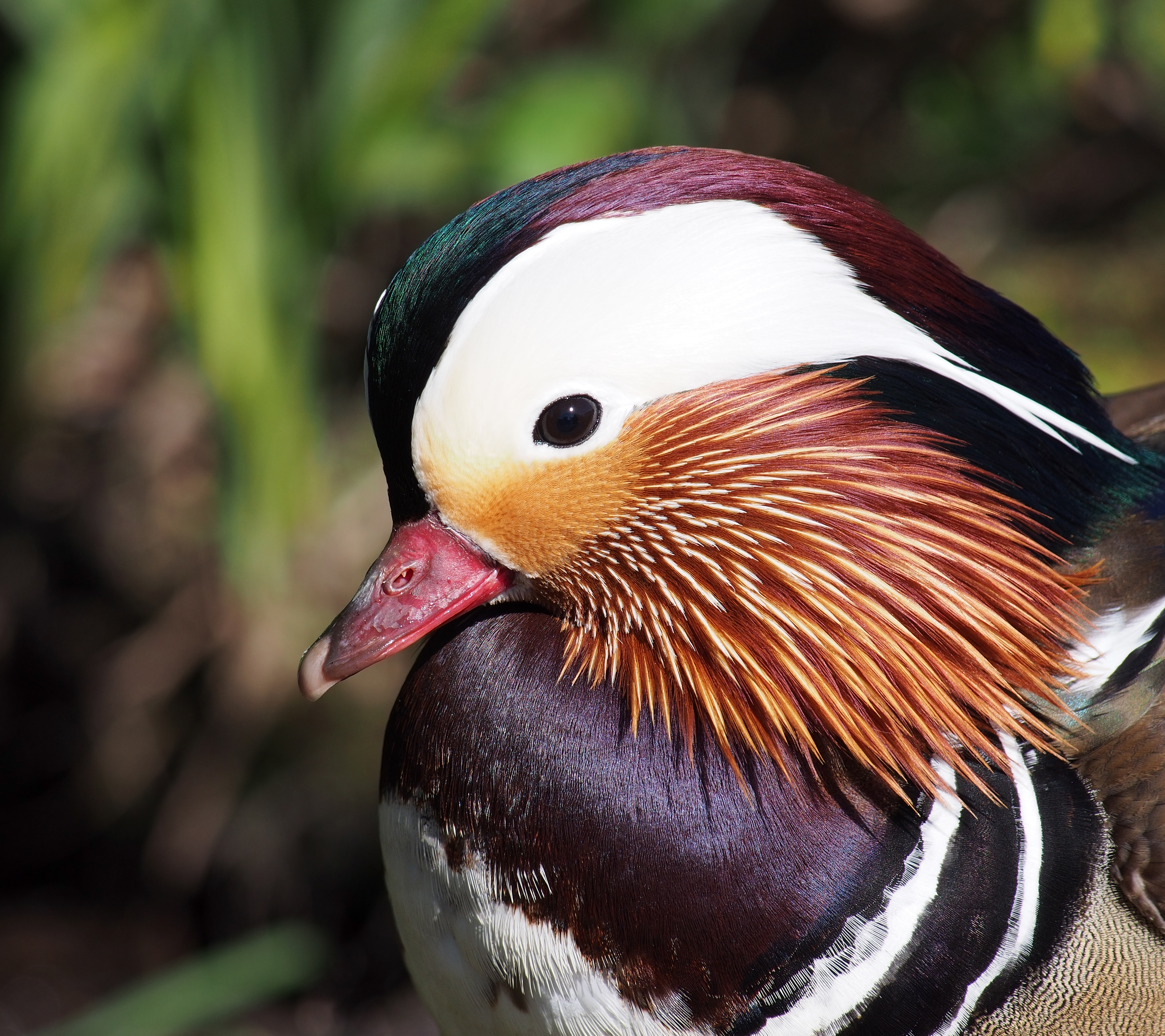
Male mandarin duck (Aix galericulata)

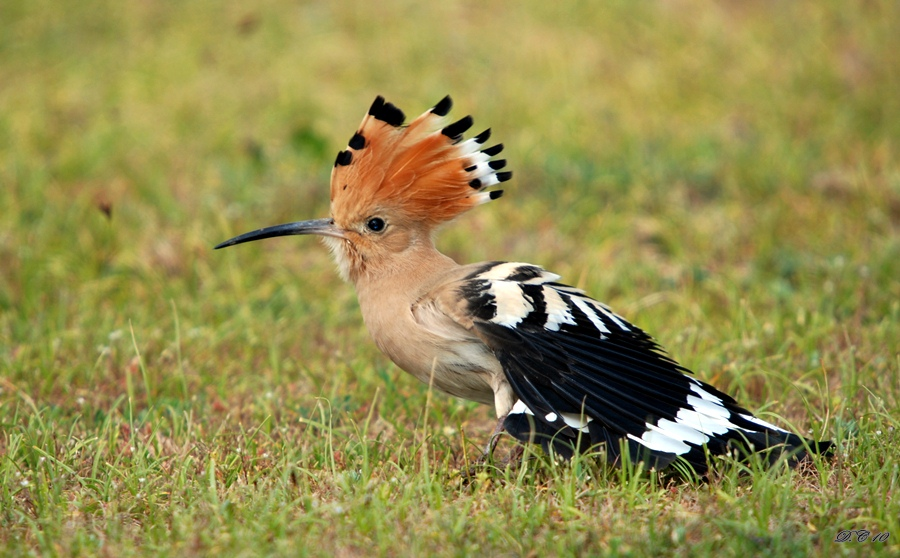
Eurasian hoopoe (Upupa epops)

From winter to summer

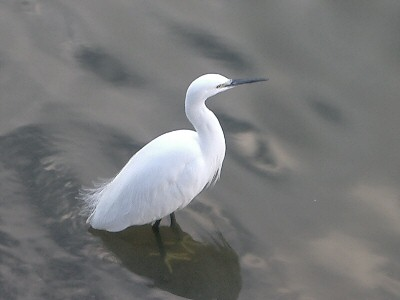
Little egret (Egretta garzetta) in Winter, without crest

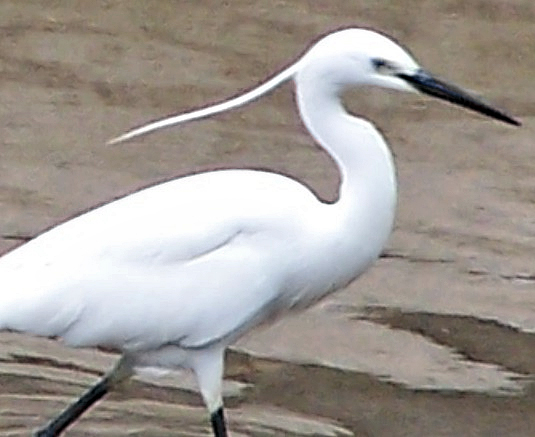
Little egret in Summer, with crest present

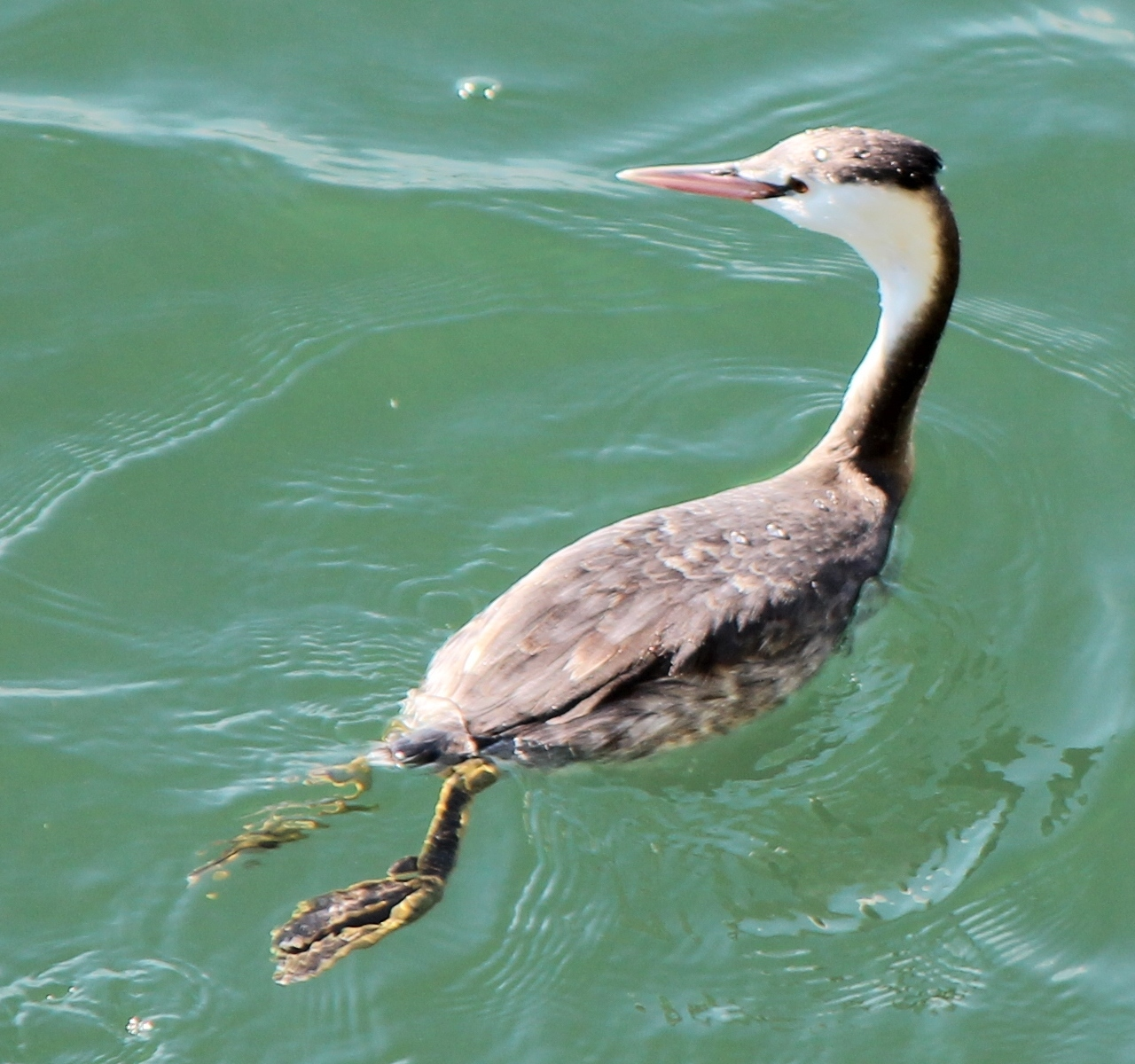
Great crested grebe (Podiceps cristatus) in winter, with a reduced crest

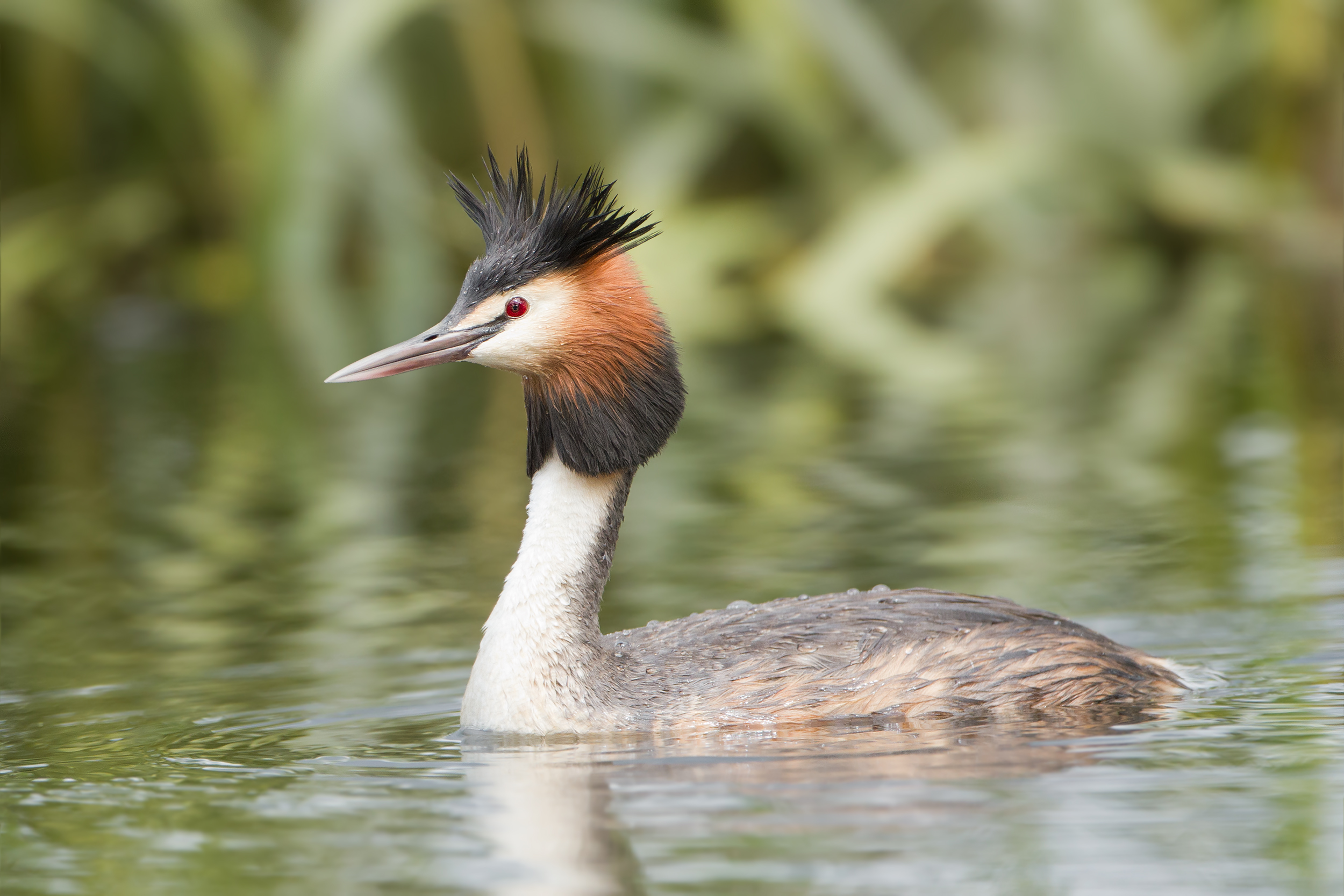
Great crested grebe in summer, with a complete crest

== See also ==
- Comb (anatomy)
- Crested penguin
- Snood (anatomy)
- Wattle (anatomy)
