= Cacatuini =

Scientific classification
- Kingdom: Animalia
- Phylum: Chordata
- Class: Aves
- Order: Psittaciformes
- Family: Cacatuidae
- Subfamily: Cacatuinae
- Tribe: Cacatuini

Genera
- Callocephalon; Eolophus; Lophochroa; Cacatua

Tribe of birds

Cacatuini is a tribe of whitish, pinkish, or greyish birds that consists of four genera:

Image	Genus	Living species
	Callocephalon Lesson, 1838	Gang-gang cockatoo (Callocephalon fimbriatum)
	Eolophus Bonaparte, 1854	Galah (Eolophus roseicapilla)
	Lophochroa Bonaparte, 1857	Major Mitchell's cockatoo (Lophochroa leadbeateri)
	Cacatua Vieillot, 1817	Subgenus Cacatua - true white cockatoos; Yellow-crested (or lesser sulphur-crested) cockatoo, Cacatua (Cacatua) sulphurea; Sulphur-crested cockatoo, Cacatua (Cacatua) galerita; Blue-eyed cockatoo, Cacatua (Cacatua) ophthalmica; White (or umbrella) cockatoo, Cacatua (Cacatua) alba; Salmon-crested (or Moluccan) cockatoo, Cacatua (Cacatua) moluccensis; Subgenus Licmetis - corellas; Long-billed corella, Cacatua (Licmetis) tenuirostris; Western corella, Cacatua (Licmetis) pastinator; Little corella, Cacatua (Licmetis) sanguinea; Tanimbar corella (or Goffin's cockatoo), Cacatua (Licmetis) goffiniana; Solomons cockatoo (or Ducorps's cockatoo), Cacatua (Licmetis) ducorpsii; Red-vented (or Philippine) cockatoo, Cacatua (Licmetis) haematuropygia
