= Kasurinen =

Kasurinen is a Finnish surname. Notable people with the surname include:

- Anna-Liisa Kasurinen (born 1940), Finnish politician
- Annituuli Kasurinen (born 1961), Finnish voice actress
- Jussi Pekka Kasurinen (born 1982), Finnish writer and scholar
