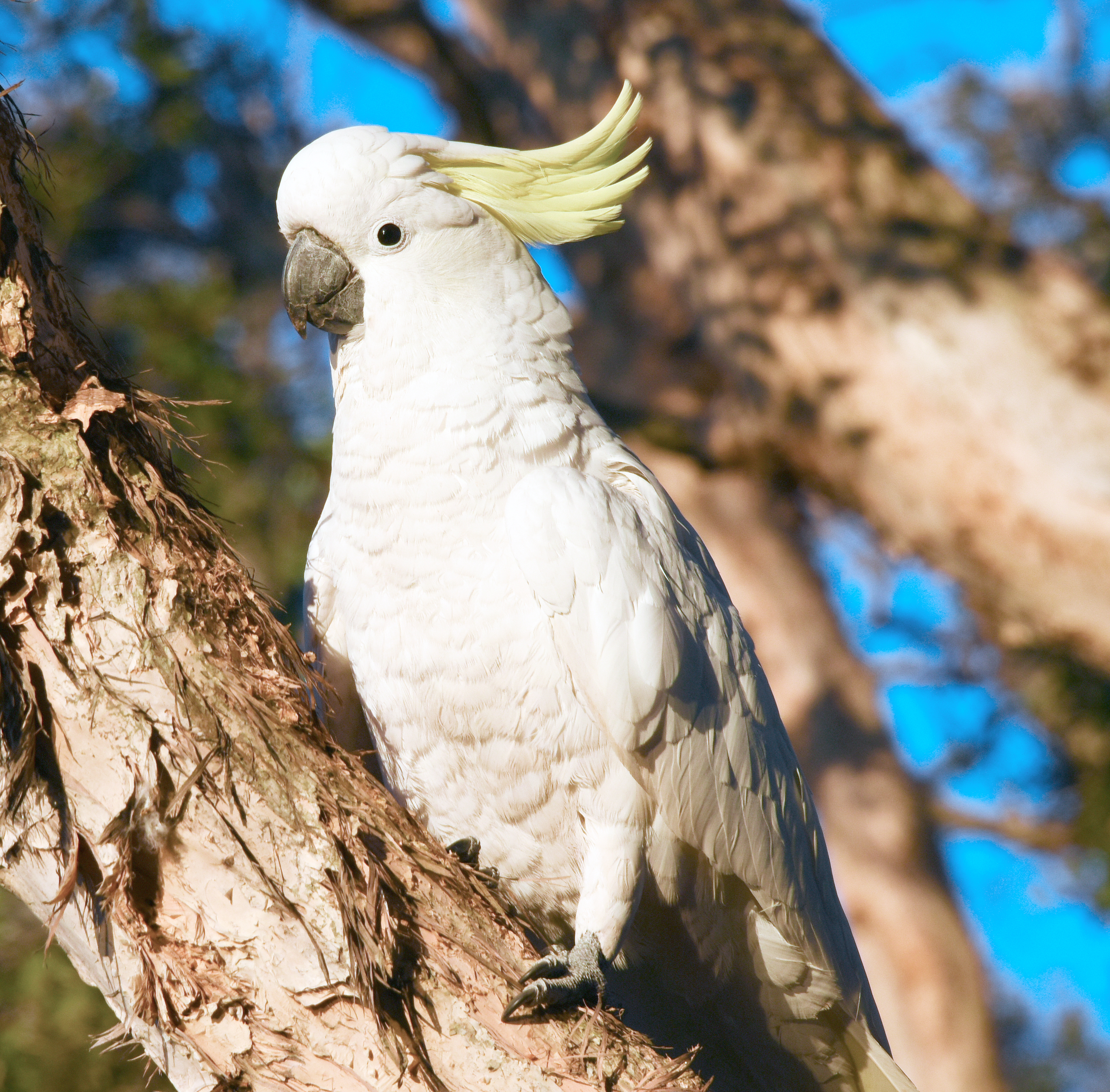
- Cacatua galerita

Scientific classification
- Kingdom: Animalia
- Phylum: Chordata
- Class: Aves
- Order: Psittaciformes
- Family: Cacatuidae
- Subfamily: Cacatuinae

Tribes
- Microglossini; Cacatuini

= Cacatuinae =

Subfamily of birds

The subfamily Cacatuinae consists of two tribes, the Microglossini with one species (palm cockatoo) and the Cacatuini with three genera:

Tribe	Image	Genus	Living species
Microglossini		Probosciger Kuhl, 1820	palm cockatoo (Probosciger aterrimus)
Cacatuini		Callocephalon Lesson, 1838	gang-gang cockatoo (Callocephalon fimbriatum)
Cacatuini		Eolophus Bonaparte, 1854	Galah (Eolophus roseicapilla)
Cacatuini		Cacatua Vieillot, 1817	Subgenus Cacatua - true white cockatoos; Yellow-crested (or lesser sulphur-crested) cockatoo, Cacatua (Cacatua) sulphurea; Sulphur-crested cockatoo, Cacatua (Cacatua) galerita; Blue-eyed cockatoo, Cacatua (Cacatua) ophthalmica; White (or umbrella) cockatoo, Cacatua (Cacatua) alba; Salmon-crested (or Moluccan) cockatoo, Cacatua (Cacatua) moluccensis; Subgenus Licmetis - corellas; Long-billed corella, Cacatua (Licmetis) tenuirostris; Western corella, Cacatua (Licmetis) pastinator; Little corella, Cacatua (Licmetis) sanguinea; Tanimbar corella (or Goffin's cockatoo), Cacatua (Licmetis) goffiniana; Solomons cockatoo (or Ducorps's cockatoo), Cacatua (Licmetis) ducorpsii; Red-vented (or Philippine) cockatoo, Cacatua (Licmetis) haematuropygia; Subgenus Lophochroa - pink cockatoos; Pink cockatoo (formerly Major Mitchell's or Leadbeater's cockatoo), Cacatua (Lophochroa) leadbeateri
