= Angry Birds Stella (TV series) =

Finnish animated television series

- Genre: Adventure; Dramedy
- Created by: Mikko Pöllä; Kari Juusonen; Eric Guaglione
- Based on: Angry Birds Stella by Rovio Entertainment
- Directed by: Kari Juusonen
- Voices of: Helja Heikkinen; Saara Lehtonen; Rinna Paatso; Annituuli Kasurinen; Sari Malinen; Paula Vesala; Antti Pääkkönen; Antti L. J. Pääkkönen
- Opening theme: "Angry Birds Stella"
- Composer: David Schweitzer
- Country of origin: Finland
- Original language: English
- No. of seasons: 2
- No. of episodes: 26 (list of episodes)

Production
- Executive producers: Mikael Hed; Steve Pegram; Mikko Pöllä
- Producer: Ulla Junell
- Editors: Anais Vincent, Duncan Rochfort
- Running time: 6 minutes
- Production companies: Rovio Animation; Anima Vitae (season 1); Cube Creative

Original release
- Network: Toons.TV
- Release: November 1, 2014 – March 11, 2016

Related
- Angry Birds Toons; Angry Birds Blues; Piggy Tales; Angry Birds: Summer Madness; Angry Birds Mystery Island

Angry Birds Stella is a Finnish computer-animated adventure television series based on the mobile game Angry Birds: Slingshot Stella produced by Rovio Entertainment. The first episode, "A Fork in the Friendship", aired on Toons.TV on November 1, 2014. The series ended on March 11, 2016.

== Overview ==
The series recounts the tale of young Stella, along with her friends Luca, Willow, Poppy, and Dahlia, who embark on adventures together, while dealing with the evil schemes of Gale, the former friend of Stella, who is the Queen of the minion pigs in Golden Island.

== Characters ==
=== Main characters ===
- Stella – A pink galah, who is the de facto leader of the flock, being described as adventurous, fierce, friendly, courageous, and bold. Despite being very upset with her former friend Gale for the latter's departure and betrayal in the name of vanity, she still considers Gale a friend.
- Dahlia – A brownish long-eared owl, who acts as the brains of the flock, being a smart inventing genius, as well as the oldest member. However, her inventions and experiments often backfire and become dangerous for others.
- Luca – A sky blue scrub-jay, who is the youngest and only male in the flock. He is very playful and imaginative but gets upset whenever he is treated like a child. Unlike the others, Luca has little to no ill-will towards Gale after the latter left the flock.
- Poppy – A cheeky and slightly crazed light yellow Cockatiel, who has a fondness for music. Poppy often annoys the group with her mischievous personality as well as her tendency to get loud while playing the drums.
- Willow – A shy dark blue western crowned pigeon with feathers resembling dreadlocks (most of which are concealed underneath her signature striped, floppy hat). Despite her shyness, Willow is a very talented artist and specializes in painting portraits. She also plays an older sister figure to Luca.
- Gale – A selfish and extremely vain dark purple violet-backed starling, who is Queen of the minion pigs and a former member of the flock. She left the flock to become the minion pigs' Queen, because, unlike her friends, the pigs were willing to do anything she wanted. Her main goal is to find the Golden Egg, a valuable item, which she believes will grant her wealth and the respect of everyone on Golden Island. Despite leaving the flock, Gale remains highly motivated to keep the attention of her former friends, which often comes into direct conflict with her superiority complex.

=== Supporting characters ===
- Handsome Pig, a pig with a blond wig and Gale's right-hand man, who has an unrequited crush on her.
- Minion Pigs, pigs who are assistants of Gale, but annoy her with their witlessness.
- Artist Pig, the pig whom Gale hires to make paintings for her (though his art skills are not to her liking). He later becomes friends with Willow.

== Episodes ==
Season	Episodes	Originally released		Season DVD release date (Region 1)
Season	Episodes	First released	Last released	Season DVD release date (Region 1)
1	13	November 1, 2014	January 24, 2015	December 1, 2015
2	13	October 9, 2015	March 11, 2016	March 1, 2016

== Home media ==
Sony Pictures Home Entertainment is the DVD distributor for the series.

- Angry Birds Stella: The Complete 1st Season (December 1, 2015)
- Angry Birds Stella: The Complete 2nd Season (March 1, 2016)
