= Willie Messino =

- Born: 1916 or 1917; Chicago, Illinois, U.S.
- Died: November 5, 2002 (age 85)
- Other name: Wee Willie
- Spouse(s): Marian Serritella(1952-2002), Victoria E. Terpening-Messino (1988 till his death)
- Children: Chris, William Jr. and Bridget (from Marian), Pete Basile (illegitimate son)

Willie Messino (1916 or 1917–2002) was an American enforcer and adviser to top Mafia bosses in the Chicago Outfit. He was known as "Wee Willie" because of his small stature. Despite his diminutive frame, Messino had a reputation as a decidedly violent enforcer.

In the 1960s, he worked for Tony Accardo and Joseph Gagliano. In 1970, he was sent to prison after being convicted of kidnapping and beating contractors George and Jack Chiagouris, brothers who owed money to the mob. After his release in December 1976, he went to work as an adviser to Marco D'Amico and then to Outfit chief Jackie Cerone. Messino's name came up again in the late 1980s when a wiretap picked up mob associate Mario Rainone expressing his concerns to Lenny Patrick that Rudy Fratto and Messino were intending to kill him. He is thought to have proposed The Cassano Brothers, Dominick (deceased), Vito (deceased), Gino and Angelo (deceased) for induction into the Outfit in the late 1990's. He died in 2002.
