= Angry Birds Pop! =

2015 tile-matching video game

Angry Birds POP!
- App icon
- Developers: Rovio Entertainment; Outplay Entertainment
- Publisher: Rovio Entertainment
- Composer: David Schweitzer
- Series: Angry Birds
- Engine: Marmalade
- Platforms: Android, iOS
- Release: CAN: December 22, 2014; WW: March 12, 2015
- Genre: Tile-matching

Angry Birds Pop! is a tile-matching video game co-developed by Rovio Entertainment and Outplay Entertainment that was soft launched for iOS in Canada in December 2014 and released worldwide for iOS and Android devices in March 2015.

It was originally released as Angry Birds Stella Pop! as the second game in the Angry Birds Stella series, and was given its current name with an update in July 2015 that brought classic Angry Birds characters into the game alongside Stella, making it the only one in the series to involve a crossover between classic Angry Birds and Stella's friends. In October 2015, the game was released as a Facebook game that was discontinued on December 21, 2016. As of March 2024, the game contains over 8000 levels.

== Gameplay ==
Gameplay screenshot

Angry Birds Pop! is the second game of the Angry Birds Stella series. The game released on December 22, 2014, in the Canada App Store and released worldwide on March 12, 2015. On October 29, 2015, the game was added to Facebook. The game features the slingshot lined up in the bottom center, the player flings the bubbles to pop the bubbles at the top with a combination of three or more bubbles with the same color. Each level will grant a limited number of bubbles given at the slingshot and more can be purchased with coins. Sometimes, there are also blocks appears at the top along with the bubbles. The game also has lives like all other match-3 games. When the player loses a level, they will lose one of it and if they lost all the lives, they must buy them by coins to continue playing. The game initially featured only the six characters that appeared in Angry Birds Stella, with each character having a special power that can be used when the Pop Meter is full to unlock powerful boosts from their powers like Stella's Power Pop, Poppy's Line Pop and many more. To fill the Pop Meter, the player has to get x6 Streaks, that means 6 pops in a row.

== Reception ==
Angry Birds Pop! was seen by some as similar to King's 2014 title, Bubble Witch 2 Saga. The Macworld reviewer enjoyed it as a free game, with its light puzzle gameplay and good production values but once a barrier in play presents itself, the reviewer thought it was best to do something else.

== See also ==
- Puzzle Bobble
