= List of Angry Birds Stella episodes =

This is a list of episodes for Rovio Entertainment's animated series Angry Birds Stella.

== Series overview ==
Season	Episodes	Originally released		Season DVD release date (Region 1)
Season	Episodes	First released	Last released	Season DVD release date (Region 1)
1	13	November 1, 2014	January 24, 2015	December 1, 2015
2	13	October 9, 2015	March 11, 2016	March 1, 2016

== Episodes ==
=== Season 1 (2014–2015) ===
No. overall	No. in season	Title	Directed by	Written by	Original release date
1	1	"A Fork in the Friendship"	Kari Juusonen	Anastasia Heinzl	November 1, 2014
Stella and her friends Poppy, Luca, Willow, Dahlia, and Gale go on a hiking trip. Upon reaching a fork in the trail, Gale separates from her friends before finding a crown. When she puts it on, Gale inadvertently attracts a group of minion pigs, who think she is the next Queen. Startled, Gale returns to her friends but changes her mind when they refuse to give her special treatment because of her new crown. Gale then becomes the new ruler over the minion pigs, while her former friends watch in sadness.
2	2	"Bad Princess"	Kari Juusonen & Juanma Sanchez Cervantes	Anastasia Heinzl & Bernice Vanderlaan	November 8, 2014
The day after Gale's abandonment of the flock, they find that the pigs are cutting down the forest to build a new castle for Gale. As the flock battles the pigs to stop it, Stella follows Gale's right-hand man, Handsome Pig, into Gale's castle only to be kicked out by Gale and her minions. Stella sadly goes home, where her friends comfort her.
3	3	"The Golden Egg"	Meruan Salim	Anastasia Heinzl	November 15, 2014
Gale learns the legend of the powerful Golden Egg and believes that possessing it would earn her the respect of Stella and the other birds. However, Gale also discovers that the Golden Egg is located under the birds' tree, and she decides to saw it down. The birds defend their home and successfully drive Gale and her minions away after Poppy destroys Gale's sawing machine by creating a shockwave with her gong (which causes severe damage to the gong itself). Gale becomes frustrated over her failure to obtain the Golden Egg until Handsome Pig reveals the existence of more Golden Eggs.
4	4	"Rock On!"	Meruan Salim	Anastasia Heinzl	November 22, 2014
Following the events of the previous episode (where Poppy's gong got badly damaged), Poppy becomes upset over her busted gong, so Dahlia cheers her up by building her a bigger and better drum set. Poppy tries out her new drum set when she and her friends perform a song, but she soon gets carried away and causes her drum set to explode, with the impact destroying her friends' instruments as well. To make it up to them, Poppy helps the group create their own homemade instruments and they reconcile until Poppy begins a (long-lasting) drum solo.
5	5	"The Runaway"	Meruan Salim	Amy Mass	November 29, 2014
After getting tricked into taking a bath, Luca sneaks out of his home at night to enjoy getting dirty. He later joins a few minion pigs on their way to Gale's castle, where Gale gives Luca special treatment. After discovering that pigs also take baths, Luca leaves the castle and gets lost in the woods until a couple of critters take him home. Despite the events, Luca does not learn his lesson, unbeknownst to the other birds.
6	6	"All That Glitters"	Avgousta Zourelidi	Bernice Vanderlaan	December 6, 2014
Gale and her minions begin their search of another Golden Egg and arrive at a hole where one of the Golden Eggs is said to be. When Gale goes down the hole to get the egg, Handsome Pig becomes worried for the Queen's safety and forces Stella, Poppy, and Luca to help rescue her. Using a rope, the birds pull Gale out of the hole and Gale returns home with a green emerald that she found during her search for the Golden Egg. Note: This is the first episode to use the new intro (which is actually reused from the trailers of the game). This intro would be used for later broadcastings of the first five episodes.
7	7	"Pig Power"	Ami Lindholm	Amy Mass	December 13, 2014
Dahlia plans to build a suspension bridge on Golden Island but her friends decline to help build it. Finding difficulty in building the bridge alone, Dahlia dons a costume to disguise herself as Gale (in the latter's absence) and orders Gale's minions to build the bridge for her. When the real Gale discovers the ruse, Dahlia slips out of her disguise right before Gale destroys it. Dahlia manages to finish the rest of the construction by herself, but the bridge collapses while the birds walk on it.
8	8	"Own the Sky"	Avgousta Zourelidi	Bernice Vanderlaan	December 20, 2014
After getting injured from a hang gliding accident, Stella becomes emotionally scared to the point that she begins to bug her friends. Concerned over Stella's changed attitude, the group come up with a plan by tricking Stella into believing that Luca is under attack by a monster, prompting her to put her fears aside and "rescue" Luca. Stella soon discovers the truth and though initially unhappy about being tricked, she appreciates her friends for helping regain her confidence.
9	9	"The Prankster" "The Trickster"	Ami Lindholm	Amy Mass	December 27, 2014
When Poppy begins a prank spree, her friends become irritated and decide to get revenge, though this backfires when Poppy discovers their plot and pranks them again. Having had enough, the flock pushes Poppy off the tree, creating a chain reaction, which results in Poppy being comically glued to a tree branch. This event ironically amuses Poppy, much to her friends' dismay.
10	10	"Piggy Love"	Meruan Salim	Anastasia Heinzl	January 3, 2015
Gale and her minions venture into a cave to find another Golden Egg. Handsome Pig, who has a crush on Gale, tries to win her heart by finding the egg for her but is constantly foiled due to bad luck. When the Golden Egg is finally discovered, Gale gets attacked by dangerous plants and insects, prompting Handsome Pig to finally rescue her, though Gale fails to acknowledge this heroic action as the insects take the egg away.
11	11	"The Portrait" "The Painting"	Avgousta Zourelidi	Bernice Vanderlaan	January 10, 2015
Appalled by Artist Pig's lack of artistic talent, Gale decides to hire Willow as her new artist, which Willow reluctantly agrees to. Willow does so well with her painting that Gale tasks her with painting a much larger portrait of herself. While working on the portrait, Willow bonds with Artist Pig and teaches him how to paint better. Gale is amazed by Willow's marvelous painting, but when Artist Pig tries to show Gale his improved art skills, she callously rejects him. Feeling sorry for Artist Pig, Willow gives him one of her paintbrushes and paints a large pig nose on Gale's portrait, much to the pigs' amusement and Gale's humiliation.
12	12	"Don't Steal My Birthday!"	Ami Linholm	Amy Mass	January 17, 2015
On Stella's birthday, her friends throw a small party for her, which she appreciates. However, Gale intervenes and turns it into a much bigger disco-themed party, making Stella uncomfortable. Stella's friends eventually convince her to join in the dancing and she proves to be a much better dancer than Gale. Luca tries to give Gale's crown to Stella as a reward for her talent, causing an enraged Gale to shut down the party. That night, Stella's friends give her a photo of her and Gale taken during the party, cheering her up.
13	13	"To the Bitter End"	Meruan Salim	Bernice Vanderlaan	January 24, 2015
Gale ventures into the volcano to search for another Golden Egg with Stella following when the volcano starts to cave in. She and Gale are forced to work together in order to escape from a rising level of lava. Gale soon finds the Golden Egg, but when she sees Stella in danger, Gale puts her interest in the egg aside and rescues her. Soon afterwards, the rest of the birds and pigs drill a hole in the volcano to rescue Stella and Gale; Stella makes it out safely, but Gale, who went back for the Golden Egg, is seemingly killed by a rockslide, ending the season finale on a cliffhanger.

=== Season 2 (2015–2016) ===
No. overall	No. in season	Title	Directed by	Written by	Original release date
14	1	"New Day"	Avgousta Zourelidi	Bernice Vanderlaan	October 9, 2015
Following the first season's cliffhanger, a heartbroken Stella tries to cope with Gale's supposed death by befriending the pigs. When Stella's bird friends disapprove of this alliance, Stella decides to move them into her home secretly, though this soon backfires. Having to choose between her friendship with the birds and the pigs, Stella chooses to move into Gale's castle with the pigs but gets second thoughts upon realizing how different the pigs are from her and decides to return to her friends. After the pigs fail to convince Stella to stay, they reunite with an injured Gale, who escaped the volcano.
15	2	"Friends Whenever"	Ami Lindholm	Bernice Vanderlaan	October 9, 2015
After the pigs discover Gale's return, they begin to ignore her because she lost her crown while escaping the volcano. By her request, Handsome Pig brings Gale to the Stella flock's tree to be nursed back to health. As the birds take care of Gale, they start to get annoyed by her attitude while Gale begins to miss her royal life. They all soon reconcile when they begin to sing a song together until Handsome Pig arrives to reveal that he found Gale's crown, prompting her to leave her friends again and return to being Queen of the pigs, much to Stella's ire.
16	3	"Night of the Bling"	Ami Lindholm	Bernice Vanderlaan	October 23, 2015
In this Halloween-themed episode, the flock goes trick-or-treating during which Luca accidentally releases a tribe of minion pigs led by a shaman, who transforms other creatures into pigs and brainwashes them into becoming his lackeys. The shaman proceeds to brainwash Dahlia, Luca, Willow, Gale, and a bunch of regular minion pigs and hosts a huge party. Stella and Poppy manage to avoid being caught and destroy the party's loudspeaker, causing a shockwave that makes the pigs fall asleep. However, their victory is short-lived when the tribe wakes up and curses them. Everyone wakes up the next morning, with the events revealed to be a dream.
17	4	"Step It Up"	Meruan Salim	Bernice Vanderlaan	November 6, 2015
Upon discovering a fruit tree on a pillar, Stella makes a series of hasty attempts to reach the tree, but she fails every time. Just as she is about to give up, Stella witnesses a chain reaction and copies this action, resulting in success. After Stella's victory, Luca reveals to her that the tree's pillar had steps to get up to it the whole time, therefore making all of Stella's attempts completely unnecessary. Though frustrated at herself for failing to realize this, Stella thanks Luca for teaching her how to be more observant, but immediately forgets her lesson when she finds a similar pillar with a banana tree, much to Luca's annoyance.
18	5	"Camp Scary"	Avgousta Zourelidi	Amy Mass	November 20, 2015
While Dahlia, Willow and Poppy are camping out, they hear a scary noise in the woods. Investigating, the three soon find a baby cave creature and lead it to the cave where it lives. However, a scared Poppy inadvertently exposes their presence to the baby cave creature's parent, who attacks them. As they escape, Dahila briefly catches a glimpse of a Golden Egg in the cave before returning to camp.
19	6	"It's Mine!"	Ami Lindholm	Amy Mass	November 22, 2015
After the events of the previous episode, Dahlia has become madly obsessed with the Golden Egg she found, and she plots to go back to the cave monster's home to steal it. Creating a decoy, Dahlia swaps it with the real Golden Egg and sneaks it into her home. She does some DNA testing with the egg and attempts to crack it open, but every object she uses on it turns to gold and turns the rest of her house into stone. After Dahlia resorts to blowing up her whole house to open the egg (which is also unsuccessful), the other birds discover what she has been up to. Afterwards, the cave creatures take the Golden Egg back, having seen through the poorly made decoy.
20	7	"Royal Pains"	Avgousta Zourelidi	Bernice Vanderlaan	December 18, 2015
Handsome Pig tries to impress Gale with a ritual from The Book. Unfortunately, each part has a catastrophic result for Gale, including the last part, in which the ruler is to be tossed down a waterfall in a canoe. Handsome Pig jumps into the canoe with Gale and manages to row her to safety, but a frustrated Gale once again refuses to acknowledge Handsome Pig's heroism and leaves him to be tossed down the waterfall.
21	8	"The Storm"	Meruan Salim	Amy Mass	January 1, 2016
After crossing paths in the woods, Stella and Gale are forced to take refuge in a cave when a storm breaks in. While being stuck in the cave, Gale's selfish attitude starts to get on Stella's nerves to the point that they begin fighting again. After a skunk begins attacking Gale, the storm stops and Stella exits the cave, leaving Gale alone with the skunk. Note: this is the only episode where Stella appears without Luca, Poppy, Willow and dahlia, This is also the only episode in which Gale appears without the pigs, and also the skunk's only appearance in season 2.
22	9	"The Golden Queen"	Meruan Salim	Amy Mass	January 15, 2016
Following a nightmare about failing to obtain the Golden Egg as well as an unsuccessful attempt to reenter the volcano, Gale discovers the Cave Creatures' home, where she discovers its Golden Egg but as she tries to escape, the giant cave monster begins to attack her. Gale uses the Golden Egg to turn the monster to gold in self-defense and exits the cave, finally successful in obtaining the Golden Egg. Note: This is the only episode in the entire series that does not have a sneak peek, this is also the only episode where Luca appears without Stella, Poppy, Willow, and Dahlia.
23	10	"Gilded Cage"	Kari Juusonen	Anastasia Heinzi	January 29, 2016
Following the previous episode, Handsome Pig becomes incredibly jealous of Gale giving all of her attention to the Golden Egg. Though the other pigs are initially amazed by the egg's ability to turn objects to gold, they turn against it when Gale uses the egg on one of her own minions. They recruit Handsome Pig and sneak into Gale's bedroom at night in an attempt to steal the egg, but they accidentally wake her up. Enraged, Gale turns Handsome Pig's wig to gold, which he ironically becomes satisfied with (despite its weight), much to the annoyance of everyone else.
24	11	"Premonition"	Ami Lindholm	Amy Mass	February 12, 2016
Following a nightmare about the Golden Egg, Willow calms down by spending time Artist Pig (whom she had met and befriended in The Portrait) in the forest. During this time, however, the forest begins turning to stone due to the Golden Egg's effect; upon discovering that Artist Pig has succumbed to the effect, Willow warns the rest of the flock about what's happening, horrifying them.
25	12	"Last Bird Standing"	Meruan Salim	Anastasia Heinzi	February 26, 2016
The flock suffers from hunger due to a lack of food since it all has been turned to stone because of the Golden Egg's effect. Gale arranges a party and tries to tempt the flock into joining it by bribing them with fruits. Everyone gives into this temptation except Stella, who, despite being very hungry, keeps resisting until Gale leaves. That night, Stella tries to sleep outside in her treehouse, when Gale uses the Golden Egg to turn the flock's tree to stone. In the end, Stella succumbs to Gale and reluctantly joins the party.
26	13	"You Asked for It"	Meruan Salim & Juanma Sanchez Cervantes	Bernice Vanderlaan	March 1, 2016 (DVD); March 11, 2016
At Gale's party, Stella is happily reunited with her friends. While Gale demonstrates the Golden Egg's powers, the flock reveals to Stella about everyone who has been put under the golden spell and they organize a plan to stop the chaos once and for all. While Gale is sleeping, Stella sneaks into Gale's castle, where the former wakes up and attacks her with the egg. During a chase, Stella snatches the egg and accidentally turns Gale into gold with it. Left with a decision on whether or not to revive Gale with the egg, Stella chooses to revive her; this unexpectedly causes Gale to have a change of attitude, and she abandons her obsession of the egg. After restoring Golden Island, the flock launch the Golden Egg into the sea, ending the series happily.
