= Annituuli Kasurinen =

Finnish voice actress (born 1961)

- Born: 27 April 1991 (age 35); Finland

Annituuli Kasurinen (born 27 April 1991) is a Finnish voice actress. She also acted in the film Helmiä ja sikoja.

== Roles ==
=== Selected films ===
- Help! I'm a Fish (2000)
- Emil i Lönneberga – Iida, Emil's sister
- The Powerpuff Girls (2002) – Bubbles
- The Cat Returns (2002) – Haru
- Lilo & Stitch (2002) – Lilo Pelekai
- Peter Pan (2003) – Wendy
- Finding Nemo (2003) - Darla Sherman
- Helmiä ja sikoja (2003)
- The Incredibles (2004) - Violet Parr
- The Chronicles of Narnia: The Lion, the Witch and the Wardrobe (2005) – Susan
- One Hundred and One Dalmatians
- Over the Hedge (2006) - Heather
- Happy Feet (2006) – Gloria
- My Little Pony: The Movie (2017) - Applejack
- Steven Universe: The Movie (2019) - Spinel

=== Animation ===
- Bratz – Yasmin
- W.i.t.c.h.
- Totally Spies! - Alexandra
- Super Robot Monkey Team Hyperforce Go! – Nova
- Kim Possible (2005–2007) – Bonnie Rockwaller
- Lilo & Stitch: The Series (2005–2007) – Lilo
- VeggieTales (2005–2007) - Junior Asparagus
- Noddy
- Trollz (2006) – Topaz Trollhopper
- LazyTown - (2006) – Stephanie
- My Little Pony
- Hannah Montana (2007) - Lilly Truscott
- Angry Birds Stella (2014) - Willow
- Glitter Force Doki Doki (2014) - Kippie, young Clara

== See also ==
- Annituuli Kasurinen at the Internet Movie Database (in Finnish)
- Annituuli Kasurinen at IMDb
