= Joseph N. Gagliano =

Joseph N. Gagliano is an entrepreneur, former investment advisor, and author of the book No Grey Areas.

At age 24, he organized and financed the multi-million dollar Arizona State University men's basketball point shaving scandal in 1993–1994, which led to several prison sentences, including a 15-month sentence for Gagliano. According to the Bleacher Report, it remains as one of the most well-known scandals in sports history.

== Early life ==
Gagliano grew up on the Northwest Side of Chicago and was raised in an Italian - American family. He went to Catholic grade school and an all-boys Catholic high school. He is the son of a Chicago police officer and housewife.

While attending college at Eastern Illinois University, Gagliano started a real estate business and opened up a campus restaurant called Joey's Place. The restaurant opened in 1987, and delivered hot dogs, beef sandwiches, and pizzas on campus. Joey's Place opened in the same center and timeframe as the original Jimmy John's in Charleston, Illinois.

At 23 years old, he started working as a clerk at the Chicago Board of Trade to eventually trading his own account in the Bond futures trading pit.

== Career ==
In 1994, Gagliano orchestrated the ASU point shaving scheme, one of the nation's worst sports gambling scandals. He fixed the outcome of three of the ASU games in the 1993–1994 season and was able to collect more than $5 million by placing bets on the games. Gagliano tried to fix a fourth game and was caught when his operation attracted the attention of the FBI, Nevada Gaming Commission and U.S. Attorney's offices.

In 1997 he pleaded guilty to conspiracy to commit sports bribery and admitted his involvement in the point shaving scheme. He was sentenced to 15 months in prison, three years parole and 100 hours of community service, and he was fined $6,000.

In late 1998, before his prison sentence began, Gagliano opened his first of many Shammy Man Car Washes. Before going to prison, he proceeded to open a second location on the West side of Phoenix as well. By 2005 he owned, operated and controlled over 15 full-service car Wash sites in the Phoenix metropolitan area and grossed over $50 million annually in sales.

== Personal life ==
In 2016, Gagliano published No Grey Areas. Gagliano now lives in Arizona with his family.

== Current projects ==
In the fall of 2021, Netflix released the documentary series Bad Sport. The episode titled "Hoop Schemes" tells the story of the 1994 ASU basketball point shaving scandal involving Gagliano and several ASU players. Currently, a movie based on Gagliano's real-life story as told in his book No Grey Areas is being written by Lewis Colick, produced by Eric and Jodi Hannah and executive produced by Gagliano. This feature film's release will be the catalytic kickoff for the "Ambassadors of Compassion Million Student PLUS+" initiative. Gagliano has also launched the 'No Grey Areas Podcasts' which are interviews covering topics such as leadership, habits, and character. The goal of the podcast is to help people live "on purpose for a purpose" and to begin promoting the future No Grey Areas movie as well as the "Ambassadors of Compassion Million Student PLUS+" initiative.

Gagliano has also founded the "Operation JOY Foundation" which aims to provide resources to organizations worldwide to find solutions for the hurt, suffering and injustices in the world today. It is focused primarily on children in need.
