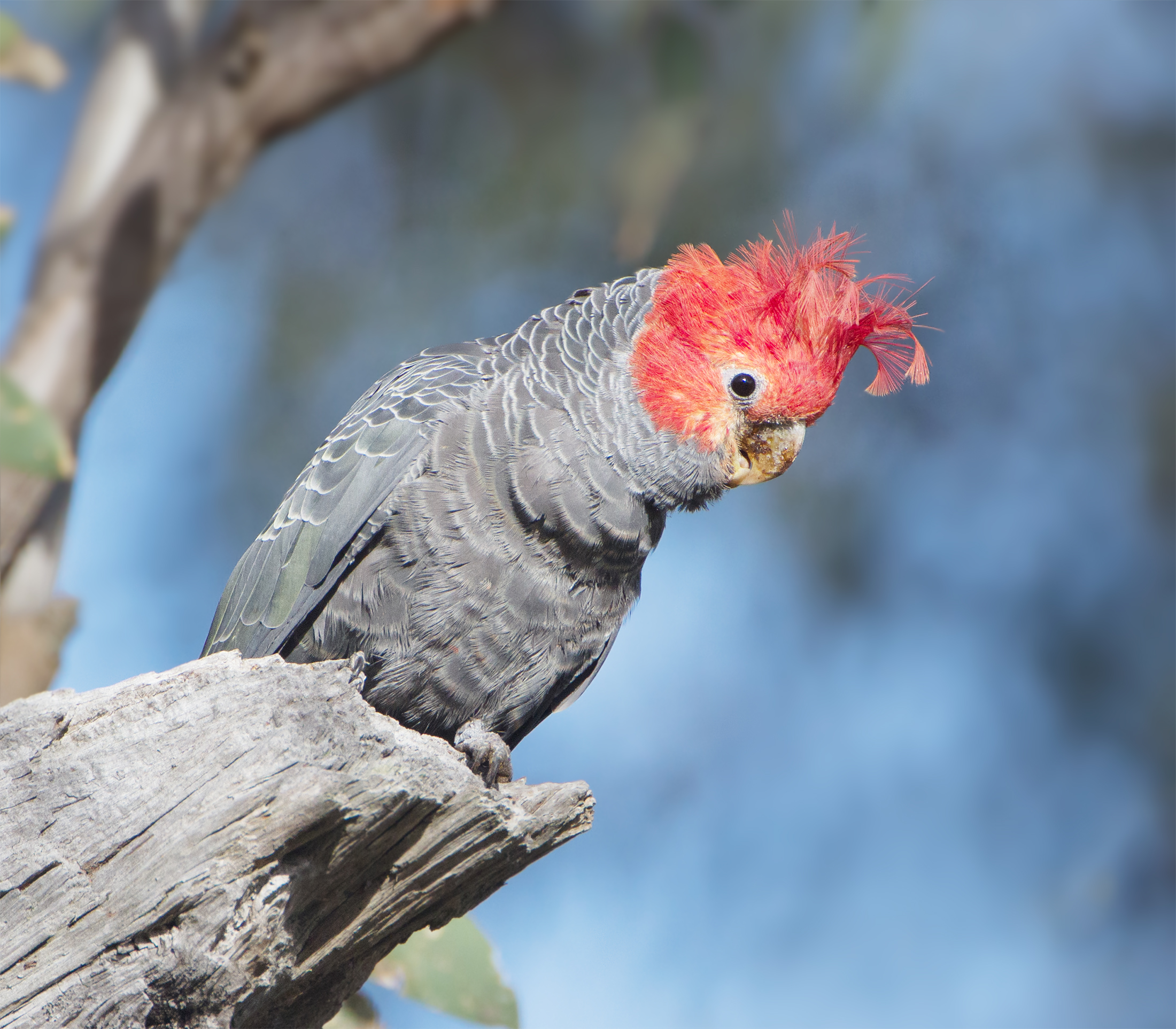
- Adult male
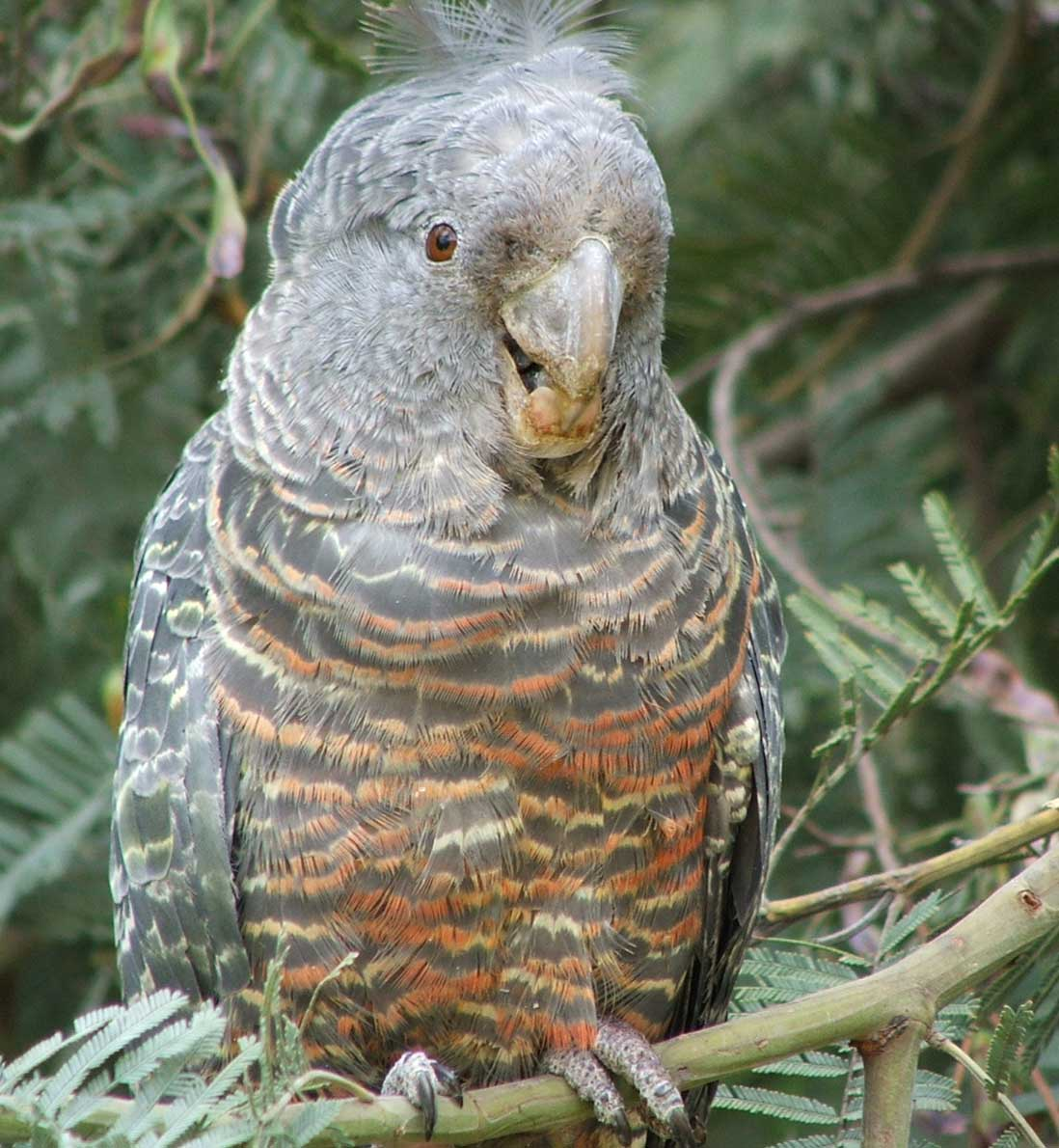
- Female

Conservation status
- Vulnerable (IUCN 3.1)

- Endangered (EPBC Act)

Scientific classification
- Kingdom: Animalia
- Phylum: Chordata
- Class: Aves
- Order: Psittaciformes
- Family: Cacatuidae
- Genus: Callocephalon; Lesson, RP, 1837
- Species: C. fimbriatum

Binomial name
- Callocephalon fimbriatum (Grant, J, 1803)
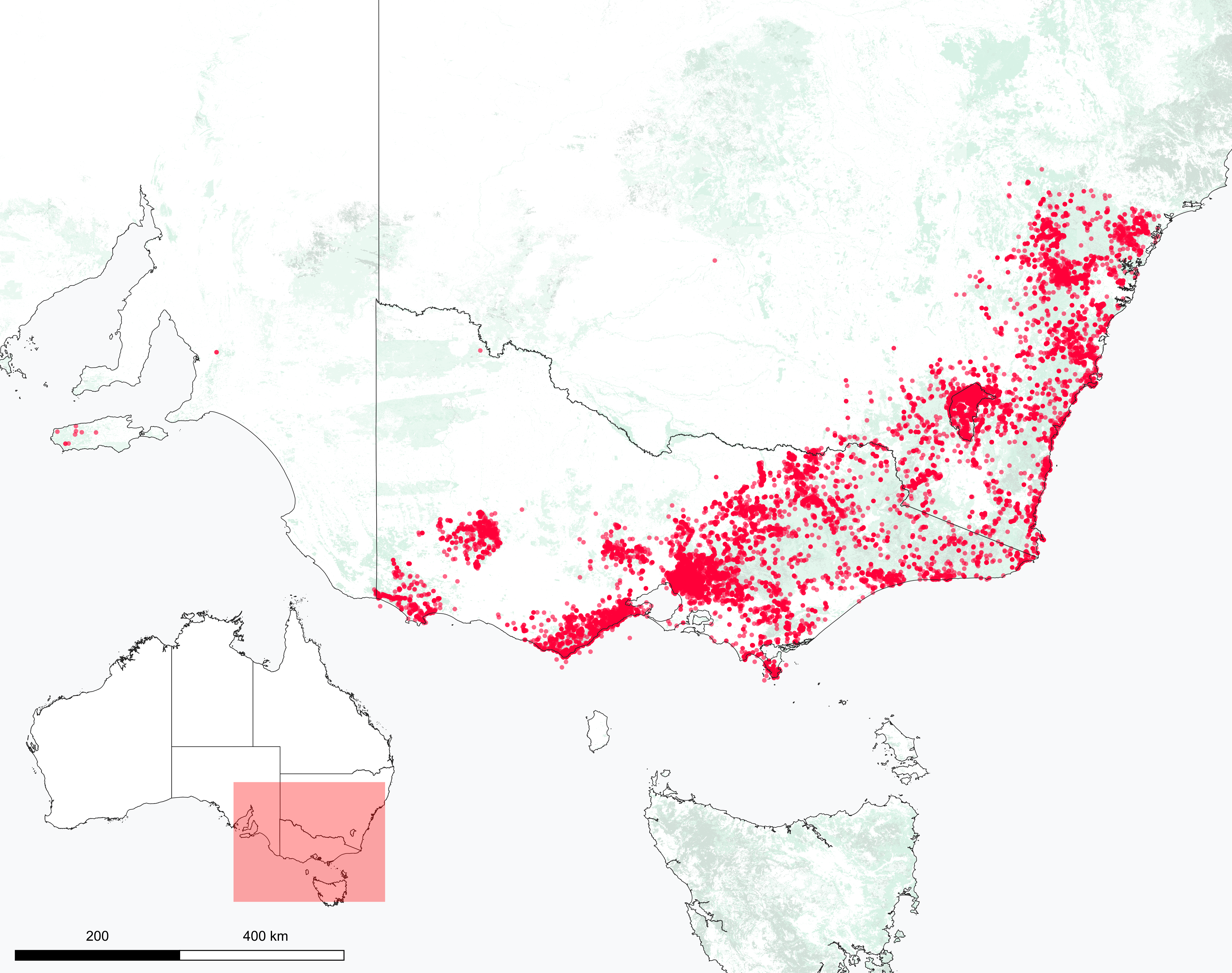
- Range of C. fimbriatum

= Gang-gang cockatoo =

Species of bird

The gang-gang cockatoo (Callocephalon fimbriatum) is a parrot found in the cooler and wetter forests and woodlands of Australia, particularly alpine bushland. It is the only species placed in the genus Callocephalon. Mostly mild grey in colour with some lighter scalloping (more pronounced and buffy in females), the male has a red head and crest, while the female has a small fluffy grey crest. It ranges throughout south-eastern Australia. The gang-gang cockatoo is the faunal emblem of the Australian Capital Territory. It is easily identified by its distinctive call, which is described as resembling a creaky gate, or the sound of a cork being pulled from a wine bottle.

The name gang-gang comes from a New South Wales Aboriginal language, probably from one of the coastal languages, although possibly from Wiradjuri. It is probably an onomatopoeic name.

== Taxonomy ==
In 1803 the British Royal Navy officer James Grant included an illustration of the gang-gang cockatoo in his book describing a voyage to the colony of New South Wales in Australia. Grant coined the binomial name Psittacus fimbriatus. The gang-gang cockatoo is now the only species placed in the genus Callocephalon that was introduced in 1837 by the French naturalist René Lesson. The type locality is the Bass River in the state of Victoria. The specific epithet is from Latin fimbriata meaning "fringed". The genus name combines the Ancient Greek kallos meaning "beauty" and kephalē meaning "head". The species is monotypic: no subspecies are recognised.

The classification of the gang-gang cockatoo has always been controversial due to the unusual appearance and coloration of the bird, especially its sexual dichromatism. The gang-gang cockatoo was thought to be a distinctive early offshoot of the Calyptorhynchinae (black) cockatoos. However, more recent molecular phylogenetic analysis places it in the Cacatuinae clade, not the Calyptorhynchinae, and having diverged from the palm cockatoo (Probosciger aterrimus).

== Description ==
The gang-gang cockatoo is 32–37 cm (13–15 in) in length with a 62–76 cm (24–30 in) wingspan, and weighs 230–334 grams. They are grey birds with wispy crests. The head and crest are bright red in males, but dark grey in females. The edges of feathers in the underparts have edges of yellow or pink. The edges of feathers on the upperparts are slightly paler grey than the rest of the feather, which makes the bird look somewhat barred. Juvenile males can be distinguished by their brighter crowns and shorter crests, but otherwise look similar to the adult female. The birds are not easily mistaken for other cockatoos, but while in flight may resemble the Galah. Gang-gangs are very social birds, but not overly noisy.

== Distribution and habitat ==
Gang-gangs are endemic to coastal regions of south-eastern Australia. They used to inhabit King Island off of Tasmania, but have become extinct there. They are an introduced species on Kangaroo Island. Gang-gangs prefer forests and woodlands in the mountains, with dense shrub understories. They migrate short distances during winter into more open habitats, but must migrate back to denser forests to breed, because they need tall trees in order to build nests.

== Behaviour and ecology ==
=== Breeding habits ===
Unlike most other cockatoos, gang-gangs nest in young, solid trees. They often nest near water. The females using their strong beaks to excavate nesting cavities. Gang-gangs are monogamous. The breeding season lasts from spring to summer. The birds will lay 2-3 white eggs, the incubation period is 4 weeks and both sexes take care of the young.

=== Diet ===
They forage in canopies mostly feed on the flowers and buds of eucalypts.

== Status ==
Loss of older, hollow trees and loss of feeding habitat across south-eastern Australia through land clearing has led to a significant reduction in the numbers of this cockatoo in recent years. As a result, the gang-gang is now listed as vulnerable in New South Wales. It is protected as a vulnerable species under the Biodiversity Conservation Act 2016 (NSW). This protection status as a threatened species makes it a Tier 1 criminal offence for a person or corporation to knowingly damage the bird's habitat. Damage is defined to include "damage caused by removing any part of the habitat". Habitat is defined to include "an area periodically or occasionally occupied by a species".

In July 2021, an Australian Department of the Environment and Energy spokesperson stated the population has declined by approximately 69% in the last three generations, or 21 years and in addition to this decline, the species has suffered direct mortality and habitat loss during the 2019–20 Australian bushfire season. Between 28 and 36 per cent of the species' distribution was impacted by the fires. As a result, it is set to be listed as endangered under the threatened fauna of Australia.

== Gallery ==
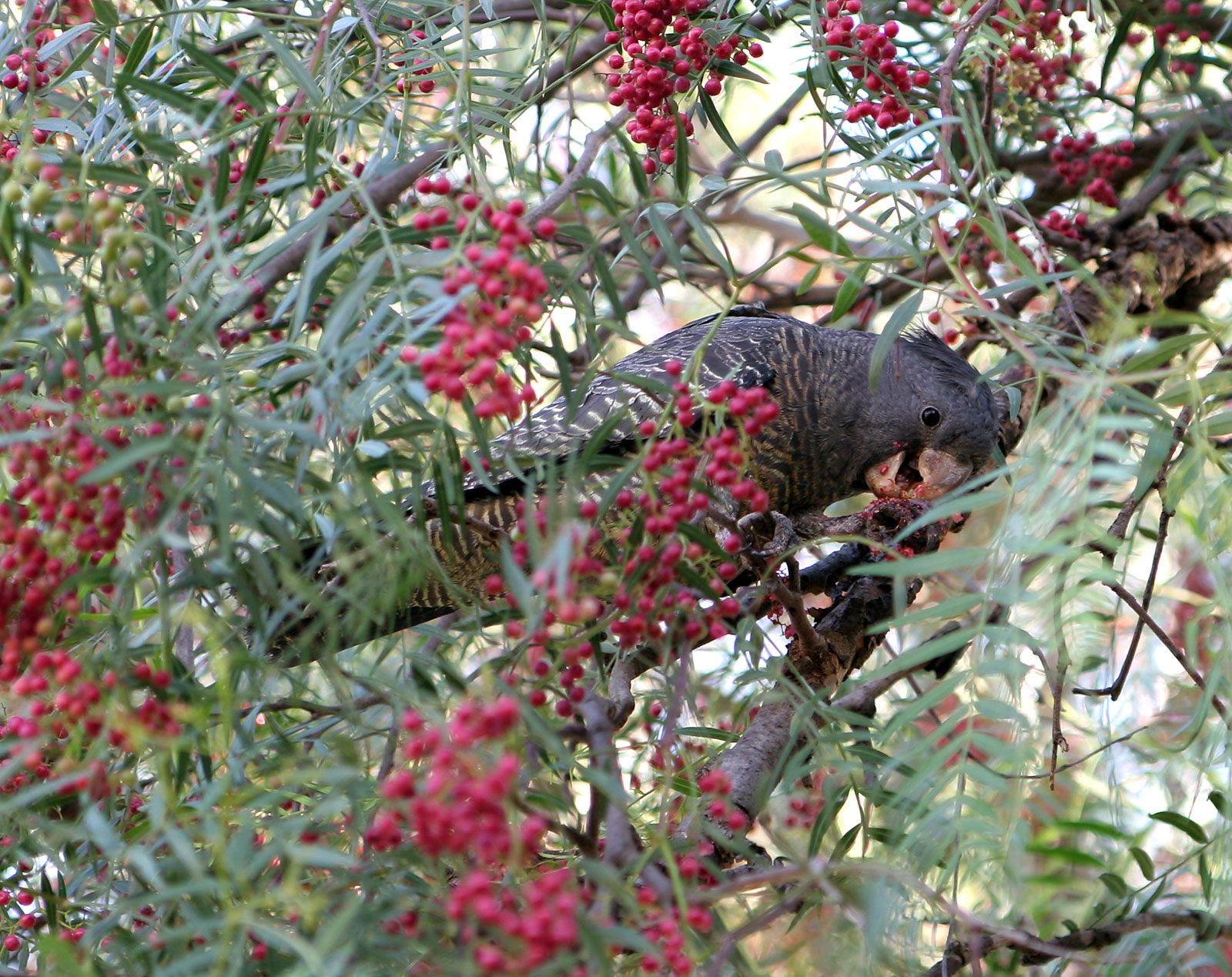
A female gang-gang cockatoo eating Schinus molle seeds

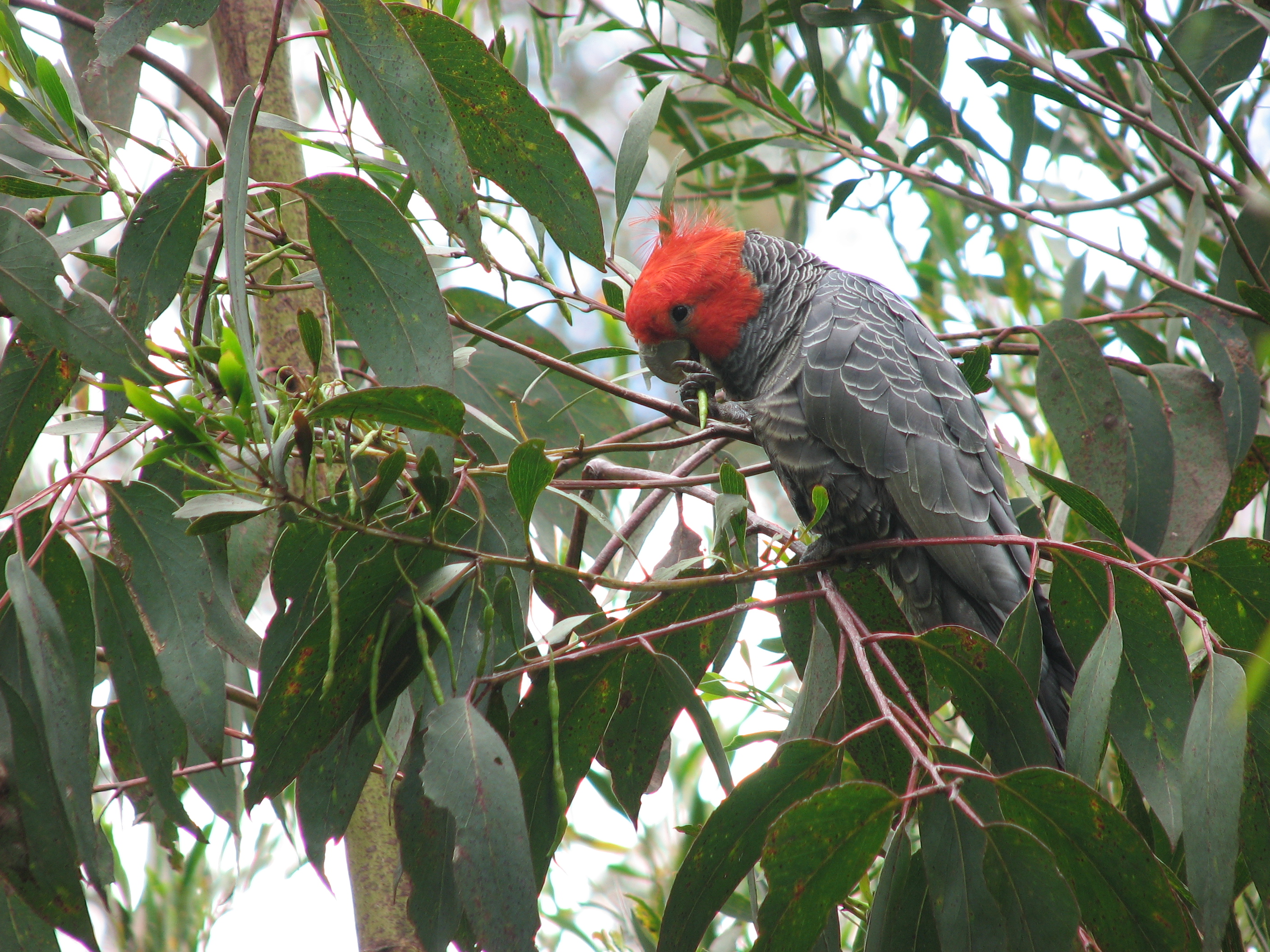
Male in the Blue Mountains

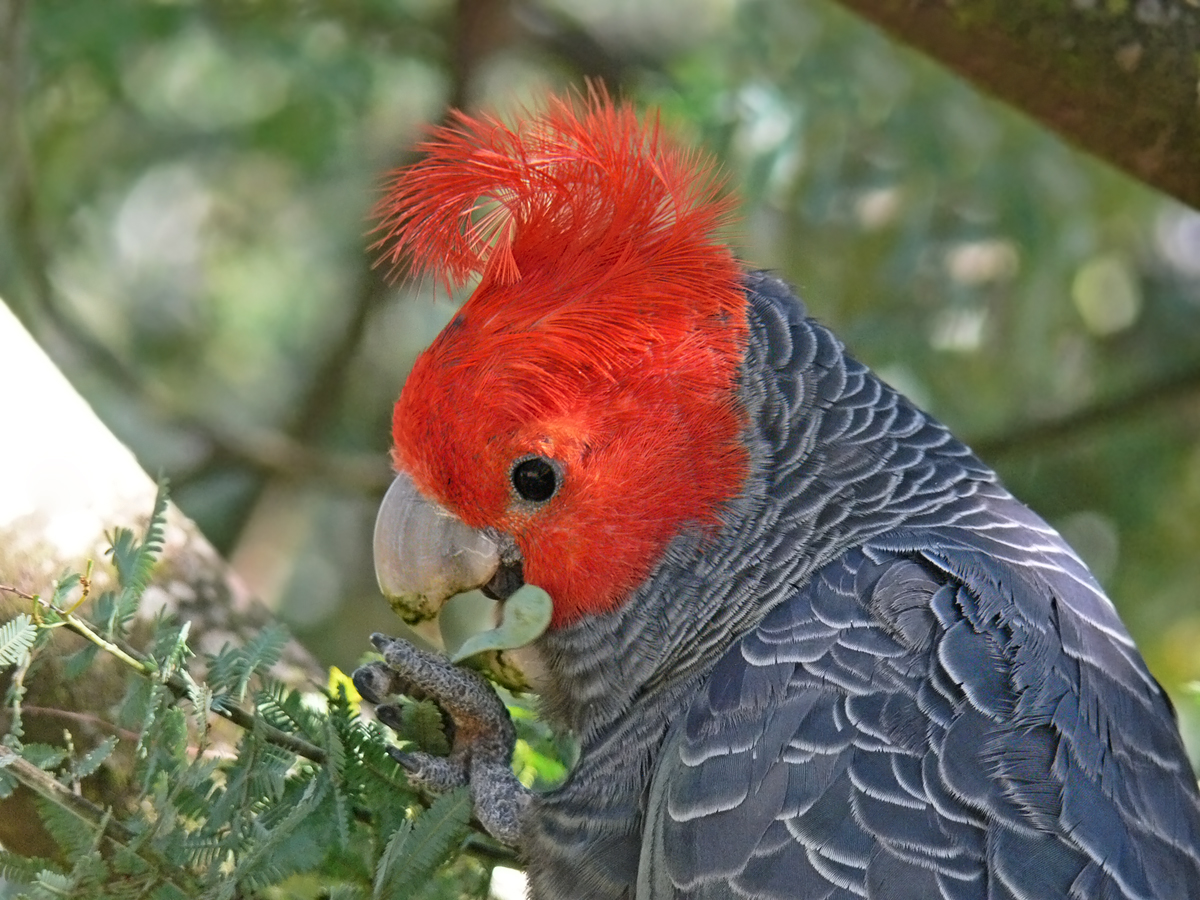
Male eating Acacia baileyana seeds

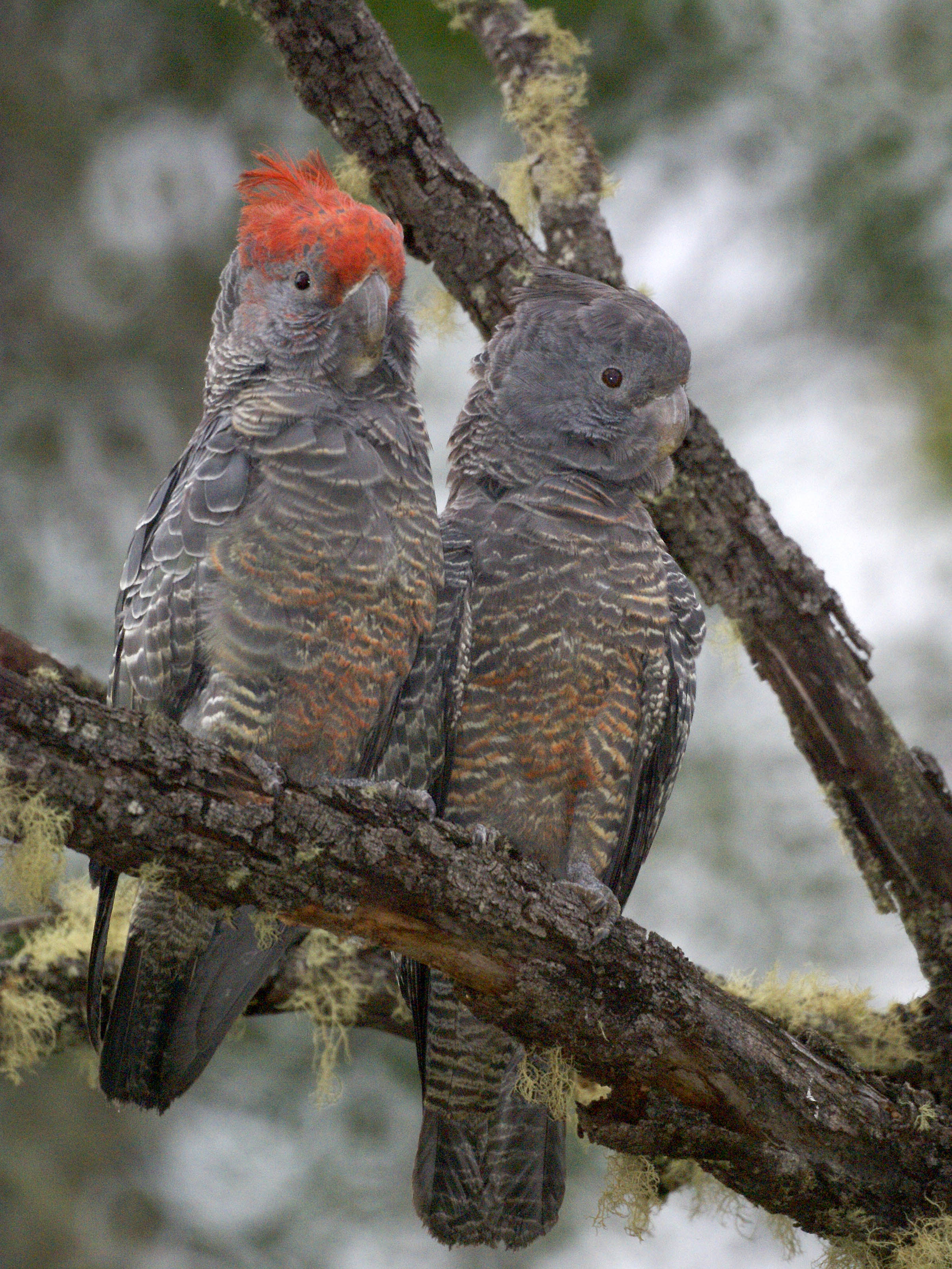
Two immature birds at New Buildings, NSW, Australia: The male is on the left and the female on the right.

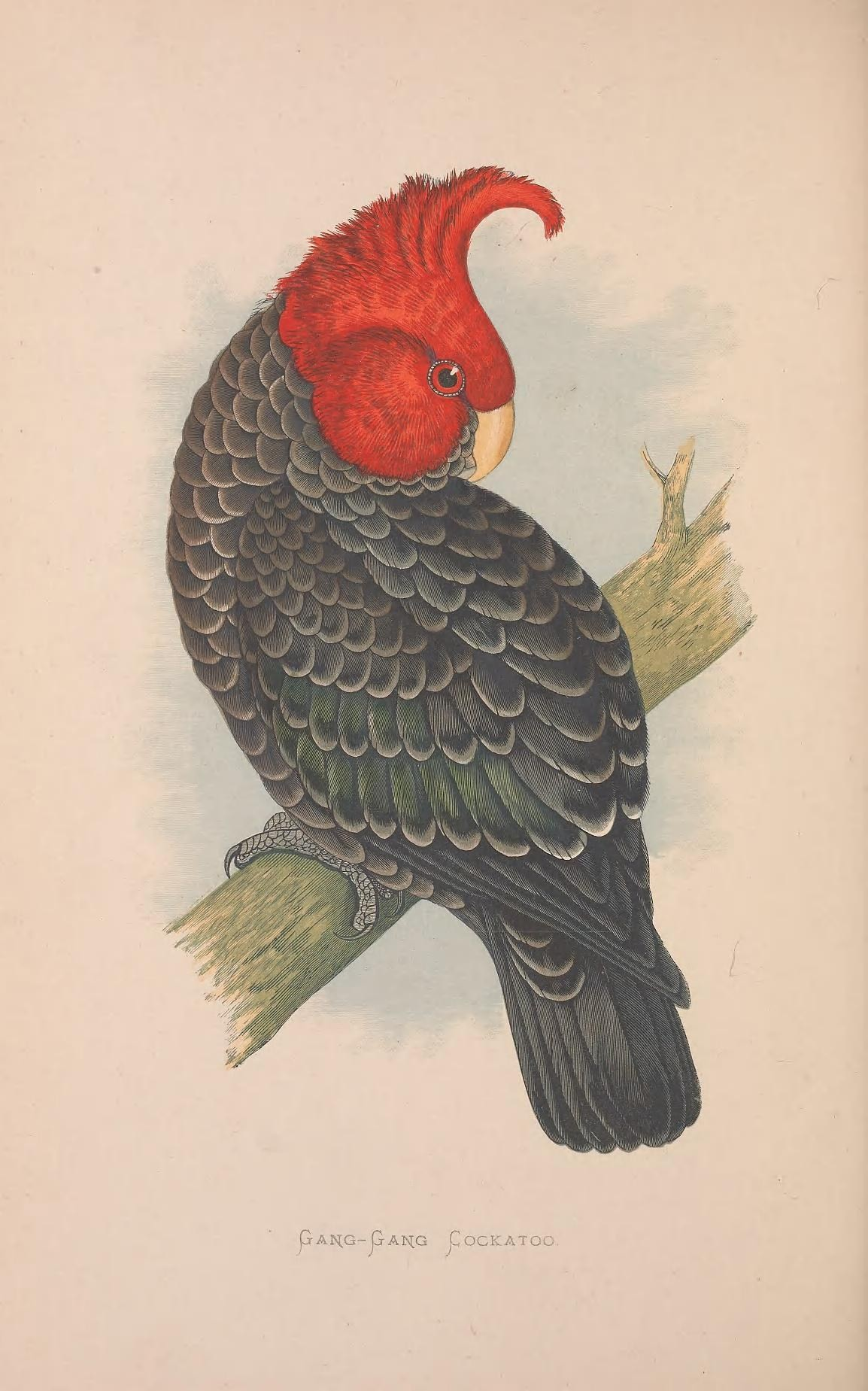
Illustration of gang-gang cockatoo
