= Angry Birds Stella =

2014 video game

- Game icon
- Developer: Rovio Entertainment
- Composer: David Schweitzer
- Series: Angry Birds
- Platforms: iOS, Android, BlackBerry 10, Windows Phone 8
- Release: September 4, 2014 – September 8, 2015 (1 year and 4 days)
- Genre: Puzzle
- Mode: Single-player

Angry Birds Stella, listed as Angry Birds Slingshot Stella, was a 2014 puzzle video game and the second spin-off from the Angry Birds series, developed by Rovio Entertainment. Announced on February 13, 2014, Rovio stated that the game would be accompanied by a toy line from Telepods, and a television series. The game was released on September 4, 2014 and was discontinued on September 8, 2015.

This game is primarily based on an Angry Birds character who was first introduced in the Angry Birds Seasons level set "Back to School", which was released in August 2012. It begins with Stella leaving the rest of the Angry Birds flock and setting off to Golden Island to visit four other friends for vacation. However, Gale and an army of pigs steal Stella's map of Golden Island and her photo album, which leads Stella and her friends to embark on a journey to stop Gale from stealing the golden items on the island and retrieve the pictures in the photo album.

== Gameplay ==
Just as in the original game of the series, players use a slingshot to shoot an assortment of birds to nearby structures, with an intent to pop all the green pigs that can be either near, in, or on the structures. Players must also make use of each bird's unique abilities, activating them while in flight to aid in defeating the pigs or destroying obstacles.

The December 2014 update, "New Pigs on the Block", added a storyline that features Stella and her friends in their treehouse looking for their house's missing items that were stolen by the pigs. They must complete random levels to retrieve the items.

=== Telepods ===
This is the third game of the franchise to be compatible with Hasbro's Telepods, a toy line also used in other Angry Birds games, such as Angry Birds Star Wars II. The Telepods are able to summon characters into the game that correspond to the scanned figure. Other than this use, the Telepods pack may come with other toy pieces and accessories for normal playing.

== Stella in other media ==
=== Television ===
Rovio announced an animated series based on the game, with the first episode released on November 1, 2014 on ToonsTV, simply named Angry Birds Stella. The first episode was "A Fork in the Friendship", that shows how Gale, Stella's former best friend and queen of the pigs on Golden Island, separated from Stella and her other friends. The series lasted for two seasons, ending just a few months before the release of the feature film based on the main Angry Birds series.

=== Books ===
Rovio has partnered with Worldreader and Room to Read, two literacy charities, to produce a series of books featuring its Angry Birds Stella characters.

Stella also appears in some issues in various Angry Birds comic book series and short story collections. Willow appears on the front cover of Angry Birds Comics Quarterly: Monsters and Mistletoe, released on December 13, 2017. Although she does not appear in any of the issue's four stories, this marks the first time any of Stella's friends have ever appeared in an English-language Angry Birds comic book. More than a month later, Gale appeared in one issue in the year-long The Angry Birds Movie comic strip run, published by GoComics.

Stella, along with Poppy, Luca, Willow, Dahlia and Gale was featured in a manga story published in the Nakayoshi magazine not long after the game was released, titled Stella: Nana and the Magic English Words, which however ended in April 2016. Belgian publisher Le Lombard later released a two-volume comic book series based on the spin-off in 2015 and 2017 exclusively in mainland Europe, first in France, before they were translated in Czech, Dutch, Spanish and German.

=== Film ===
Stella and all of her friends, except Luca, appear in the animated Angry Birds film adaptations with fully visibly wings and talons, as well as Gale, the spin-off's main antagonist. However, they play very small, mostly non-speaking roles in these films. As both films show that Stella's friends all lived in Bird Island in the first place, and that Gale was always a benevolent friend, they effectively retcon out the spin-off's plot and setting.

- In The Angry Birds Movie, Kate McKinnon voices Stella, and Charli XCX voices Willow, while Maya Rudolph voiced Poppy for one scene without being credited. Stella and her friends put together a welcome celebration for the Bad Piggies when they first arrived. After the Pigs turned on the Birds and stole their eggs, Stella and Willow joined Red's effort to launch a counterattack on the Pigs and take back the stolen eggs, with the former being launched from the slingshot into Pig City.
- Stella and most of her friends also appear in The Angry Birds Movie 2, but none of the voice actresses who portrayed some of them in the first film reprise their roles. Stella is seen running an apple stand at the time, while Dahlia, Gale and Willow are later seen taking part in a speed dating session, with Dahlia and Willow being suitors to Chuck and Bomb respectively in a rare moment in Angry Birds history where any of Stella's friends have a face-to-face encounter with birds from the classic Angry Birds flock. Gale and Dahlia are also enrolled in Avian Academy, unimpressed with Silver's invention, the Super String, despite the latter's knack for science in the source material. Willow and Poppy both witnessed the destruction of Mighty Eagle's mountain cave, caused from an attack from Zeta, the film's main antagonist. Stella, Poppy, Willow and Dahlia later attended the wedding of Mighty Eagle and Zeta after the latter is defeated.

=== Music ===
Willow, voiced by Charli XCX, sings the song "Explode", while performing with Stella and most of her friends as part of a welcome celebration for the pigs in The Angry Birds Movie. The full song is available on the film's soundtrack, and was also released online as a free YouTube video by the soundtrack's distributor, Atlantic Records.

== Reception ==
Reception

Aggregate score
| Aggregator | Score |
|---|---|
| Metacritic | 66/100 |

The game has received generally mixed reviews with a Metacritic score of 66/100 based on 9 reviews. Pocket Gamer said, "It's Angry Birds. If you care about that any more then you'll probably find something to enjoy. Just watch out for the timers." Some reviewers have praised the game for its introduction of new characters and return to the original style of gameplay.

== Discontinuation ==
After the release of Angry Birds Stella, a third, unnamed chapter was teased at the end of the game's second chapter, but it was cancelled, and the game was discontinued on September 8, 2015 (thus leaving the game's storyline off on a cliffhanger). However, Stella's adventures continue in Angry Birds POP! and the second and final season of the Angry Birds Stella series.

== Other games ==
- Stella and her friends also appeared in Angry Birds Stella POP!, a bubble shooter tile matching game. The game was soft launched for iOS in Canada on December 22, 2014 and released worldwide for iOS and Android on March 12, 2015. A few months later, however, on July 6, 2015, the game was retitled Angry Birds Pop as classic Angry Birds characters crossed over into the game, making it the first and only one in the series to have both classic Angry Birds heroes and Stella's friends together.
- Stella, Willow and Gale were also planned to appear in Angry Birds Holiday, an endless business management simulator where birds as they appear in The Angry Birds Movie would run a vacation resort and offer services to incoming pigs, but the game was cancelled by the end of 2016.
- After Stella was added as a non-playable character to the 2019 game Angry Birds Dream Blast, her friends made a cameo appearance in the Christmas 2019 event "Holiday Gathering", where they were all invited by Mighty Eagle along with the entire original flock except Hal, Bubbles and Terence, to a banquet for a holiday celebration. For a limited time, players were challenged to complete an increasing number of levels to invite each Bird to the banquet. All of the Birds are depicted as younger versions of themselves as they appeared in the animated films.

== See also ==
- List of Angry Birds Stella episodes
