= David Schweitzer (composer) =

British composer

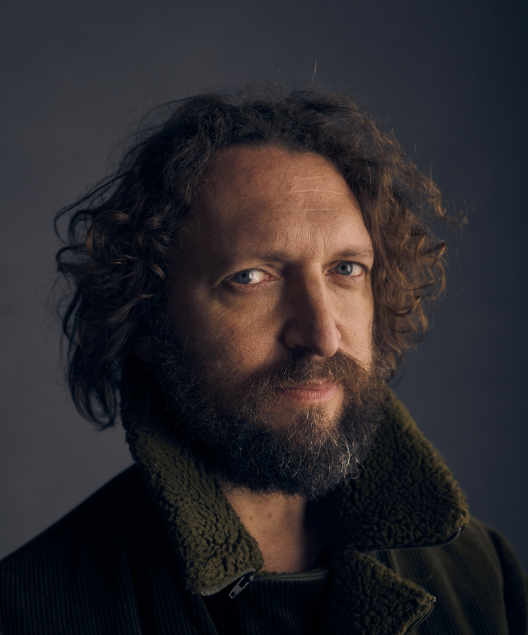
- Born: London, United Kingdom
- Education: New College, Oxford
- Occupation: Composer
- Website: https://www.davidschweitzer.net/

David Schweitzer is a British composer.

== Career ==
Schweitzer studied at New College, Oxford. He studied screen music at the National Film and Television School. He is a member of the British Academy of Film and Television Arts and the World Soundtrack Awards.

== Selected works ==
=== Television ===
Year	Title	Ref.
2010	Richard Hammond's Invisible Worlds	
2013	Supersized Earth	
2013	Wonders of Life	
2014	Operation Cloud Lab: Secrets of the Skies	
2019	Moon Landing Live	
2019–2023	Danny and Mick	
2020	The Rise of the Murdoch Dynasty	
2020	All or Nothing: Tottenham Hotspur	
2021	9/11: One Day in America	
2021	Bad Sport	
2021	Four Hours at the Capitol	
2022-2023	Sanditon (series 2–3)	
2022	Trust No One: The Hunt for the Crypto King	
2022	Our Great National Parks	
2022	Elizabeth: The Unseen Queen	
2023	John Lennon: Murder Without a Trial	
2023	The Reluctant Traveler	
2023	The Most Hated Man on the Internet	
2023	The Afterparty (series 2)	
2023	World War II: From the Frontlines	
2024	In Vogue: The 90s	

=== Film ===
Year	Title	Ref.
2010	The Taking of Prince Harry	
2015	A Gert Lush Christmas	
2020	Emma	
2023	My Happy Ending	
2023	Vjeran Tomic: The Spider-Man of Paris	
2024	Buy Now! The Shopping Conspiracy	
2024	Stopping the Steal	
2024	Ukraine: Enemy in the Woods	
2024	The Truth vs. Alex Jones	

==== Animation ====
Year	Title	Ref.
2006–2007	Charlie and Lola	
2010–2013	The Cat in the Hat Knows a Lot About That!	
2011–2013	Mike the Knight	
2012	The Cat in the Hat Knows a Lot About Christmas!	
2013–2014	Angry Birds Toons	
2013–2014	Q Pootle 5	
2014–2016	Angry Birds Stella	
2015–2016	Miffy's Adventures Big and Small	
2015–2017	Bob the Builder	
2016	Digby Dragon	
2017	Aliens Love Underpants And...	
2017	Olobob Top	
2018	Aliens Love Underpants And... Panta Claus	

=== Video games ===
Year	Title	Ref.
2014	Angry Birds Stella	
2015	Angry Birds Pop!	

== Awards and nominations ==
Year	Result	Award	Category	Work	Ref.
2024	Won	News and Documentary Emmy Awards	Outstanding Music Composition	World War II: From the Frontlines	
2023	Nominated	Hollywood Music in Media Awards	Original Score – Documentary Series – TV/Digital	The Reluctant Traveler	
2022	Nominated	Hollywood Music in Media Awards	Original Score – Documentary Series – TV/Digital	Our Great National Parks	
2022	Nominated	Ivor Novello Awards	Best Television Soundtrack	Elizabeth: The Unseen Queen	
2022	Nominated	News and Documentary Emmy Awards	Outstanding Music Composition	9/11: One Day in America	
2021	Nominated	International Film Music Critics Award	Best Original Score for a Comedy Film	Emma	
2021	Nominated	International Film Music Critics Award	Breakthrough Composer of the Year	Emma	
2018	Nominated	British Academy Children's Awards	Best Short Form	Aliens Love Underpants And...	
2011	Nominated	Daytime Emmy Awards	Outstanding Original Song - Children's and Animation	The Cat in the Hat Knows a Lot About That!	
2007	Won	Royal Television Society	Best Music, Original Score	Charlie and Lola	
2004	Won	Royal Television Society	Student Television Award	Little Scars	
