= Bad Sport =

2021 docuseries

- Promotional poster
- Genre: Docu-series
- Directed by: Miles Blayden-Ryall; Georgina Cammalleri; James House; Lizzie Kempton; Alex Kiehl; Luke Sewell
- Composer: David Schweitzer
- Country of origin: United States
- Original language: English
- No. of seasons: 1
- No. of episodes: 6

Production
- Producers: Lia Nicholls; Alessandra Bonomolo; Georgina Cammalleri; Sophie Donovan; Arianna Perretta
- Running time: 55-86 minutes
- Production company: Raw Entertainment

Original release
- Network: Netflix
- Release: August 6, 2021

Bad Sport is a 2021 American six-part docuseries created for Netflix.

== Summary ==
The series features six different stories about sports and crime, which are told through first-hand interviews.

== Episodes ==
=== Season 1 (2021) ===
No.	Title	Original release date
1	"Hoop Schemes"	October 6, 2021
2	"Need for Weed"	October 6, 2021
3	"Footballgate"	October 6, 2021
4	"Gold War"	October 6, 2021
5	"Horse Hitman"	October 6, 2021
6	"Fallen Idol"	October 6, 2021

== Release and reception ==
It was released on October 6, 2021.

The series received a 100% approval rating based on 5 votes on the review aggregator site Rotten Tomatoes.
