= Jussi Pekka Kasurinen =

Finnish writer and scholar (born 1982)

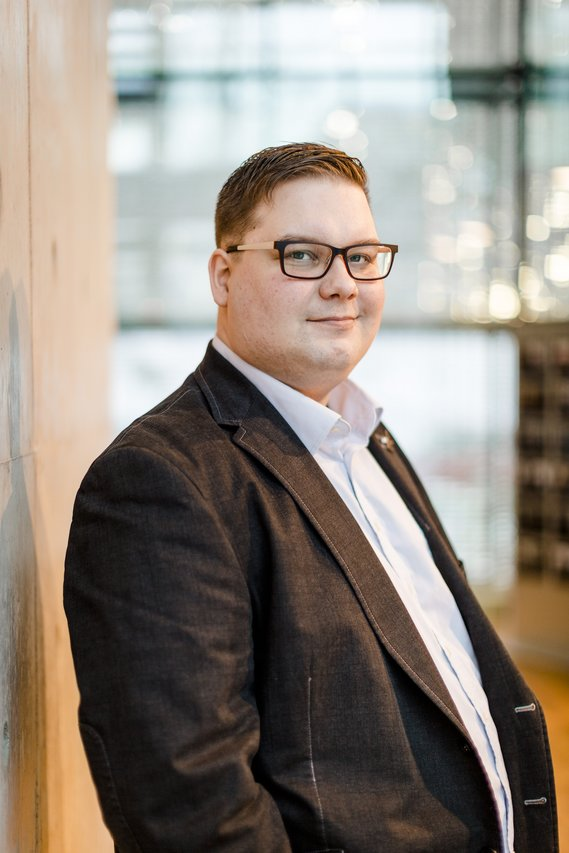
- Kasurinen in 2016
- Born: 24 April 1982 (age 44); Savonlinna, Finland
- Education: Lappeenranta University of Technology
- Occupations: Researcher, writer
- Website: jussikasurinen.net

Jussi Pekka Kasurinen (born 24 April 1982) is a Finnish non-fiction writer and a post-doctoral scholar, born in Savonlinna, Finland, in 1982.

== Academic career ==
He graduated as a Master of Science (in engineering) from Lappeenranta University of Technology (LUT) in 2007 and finished his PhD in 2011, also in LUT.

== Awards received in academia ==
Jussi Kasurinen has received the best paper award in the Computer Systems and Technologies conference in 2016 with his paper "Games as Software – Similarities and Differences between the Implementation Projects".

== Non-academic career ==
Kasurinen has also utilized his knowledge gained in academia to popularize science as a writer. He has written several books and articles in IT magazines, such as Skrolli. Kasurinen uses his full name when writing books so that he would not be confused with another Jussi Kasurinen who is also a writer.

== List of books Kasurinen has written ==
- Kasurinen, Jussi. Outoa ohjelmointia (Weird programming), publisher Docendo Oy, 192 pages, 2016, ISBN 978-952-291-244-2
- Kasurinen, Jussi. Ohjelmistotestauksen käsikirja (Guidebook to Software Testing), publisher Docendo Oy, 240 pages, 2013. ISBN 978-952-5912-99-9
- Kasurinen, Jussi. Ruby on Rails-ohjelmointi (Programming with Ruby on Rails), publisher Docendo/WSOYPro Oy, 260 pages, 2011. ISBN 978-951-0-37139-8
- Kasurinen, Jussi. Python 3-ohjelmointi (Introduction to Python 3 Programming), publisher Docendo/WSOYPro Oy, 255 pages, 2009. ISBN 978-951-0-35273-1
- Kasurinen, Jussi. Python 3 programming (e-book), 180 pages, 2010. Published by Viope Oy as a part of Python 3 programming course. Available at Viope web store.
- Python – ohjelmointiopas (Python – programming manual), Lappeenranta University of Technology, 167 pages, 2007. ISBN 978-952-214-440-9

== Other career events ==
Kasurinen is credited as actor in Iron Sky: Coming Race and producer in the 2016 short film Infirmity.

Kasurinen is a member of Finnish Software Measurement Association (FiSMA), working as a board member and chairman of the research forum.

Kasurinen has Bacon-Erdos-index of 8.
