= My Little Pony: The Movie =

My Little Pony: The Movie may refer to:

- My Little Pony: The Movie (1986 film), the first theatrically released film of the franchise
- My Little Pony: The Movie (2017 film), a theatrical film based on the 2010 TV series My Little Pony: Friendship Is Magic
  - My Little Pony: The Movie (soundtrack), the soundtrack album for the 2017 film

== See also ==
- My Little Pony
  - My Little Pony (2003 toyline): for the direct-to-video films from the 2000s
  - List of My Little Pony: Equestria Girls animations#Films (2013–2016): for the films from the Equestria Girls anthropomorphic spin-off series
