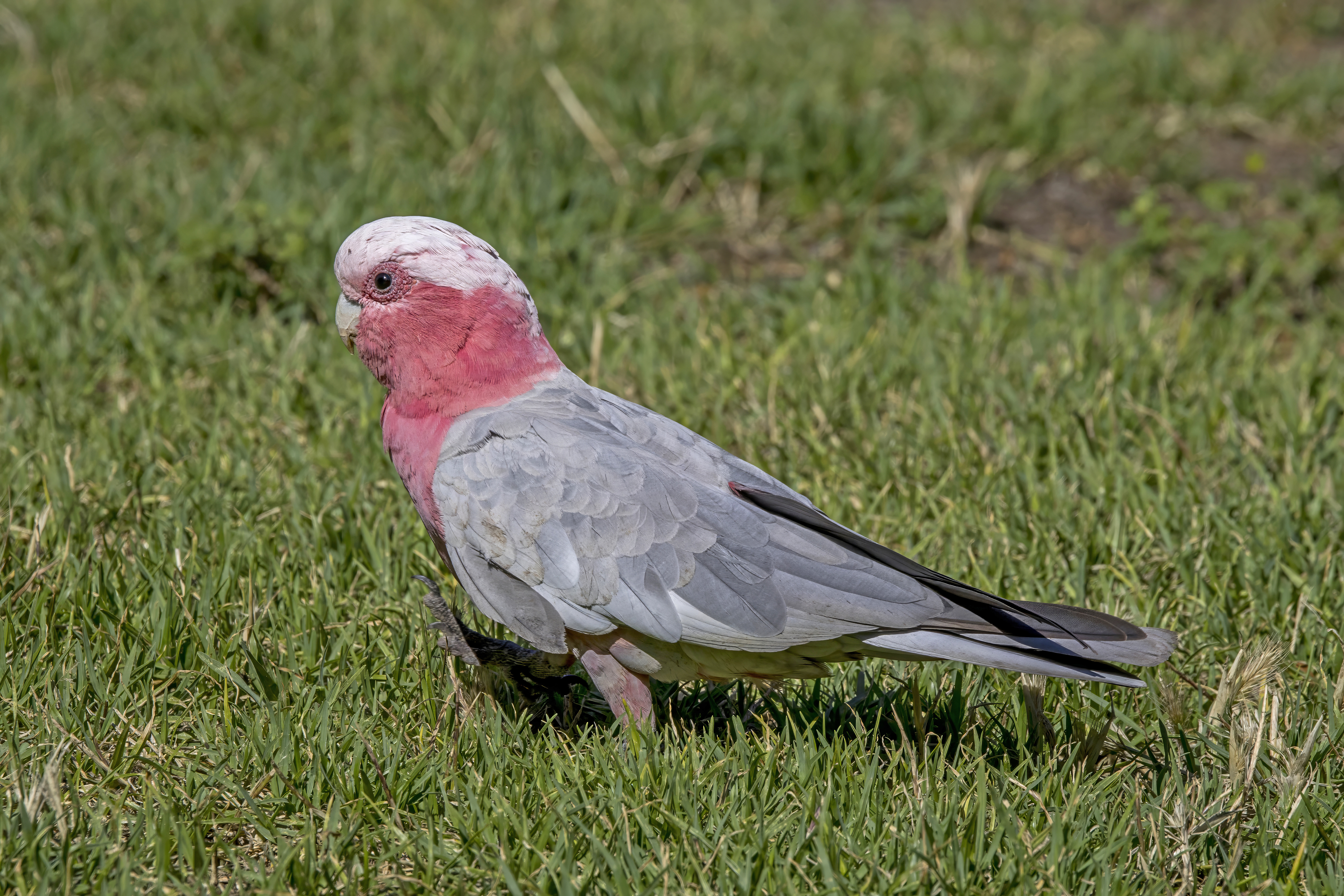
- Male, Adelaide

Conservation status
- Least Concern (IUCN 3.1)

Scientific classification
- Kingdom: Animalia
- Phylum: Chordata
- Class: Aves
- Order: Psittaciformes
- Family: Cacatuidae
- Genus: Eolophus; Bonaparte, 1854
- Species: E. roseicapilla

Binomial name
- Eolophus roseicapilla (Vieillot, 1817)

Subspecies
- E. r. roseicapilla; E. r. albiceps; E. r. kuhli
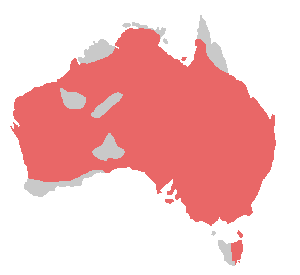
- Galah range (in red; all-year resident)

Synonyms
- Cacatua roseicapilla Vieillot, 1817; Eolophus roseicapillus Sibley and Monroe, 1990

= Galah =

Type of cockatoo

The galah (/ɡəˈlɑː/; Eolophus roseicapilla), less commonly known as the pink and grey cockatoo, galah cockatoo, or rose-breasted cockatoo, is an Australian species of cockatoo and the only member of the genus Eolophus. The galah is adapted to a wide variety of modified and unmodified habitats and is one of Australia's most abundant and widespread bird species. The species is endemic to mainland Australia. It was introduced to Tasmania, where it is now widespread, in the mid-20th century and much more recently to New Zealand.

== Etymology ==
The term galah is derived from gilaa, a word from the Yuwaalaraay and neighbouring Aboriginal languages spoken in north-western New South Wales.

== Description ==
Sound of galahs preparing to roost

The galah is about 35 cm (14 in) in length, and weighs 270–350 g (10–12 oz). It has a pale silver to grey back, a pale grey rump, a pink face and breast, and a light pink mobile crest. It has a bone-coloured beak, and the bare skin of the eye ring is carunculated. It has grey legs. The sexes appear similar.

Adult birds differ in the colour of the irises. The male has very dark brown (almost black) irises and the female has mid-brown or red irises. Adults are more brightly coloured than juveniles. Juveniles have a greyish breast, crown, and crest, and brown irises with whitish non-carunculated eye rings.

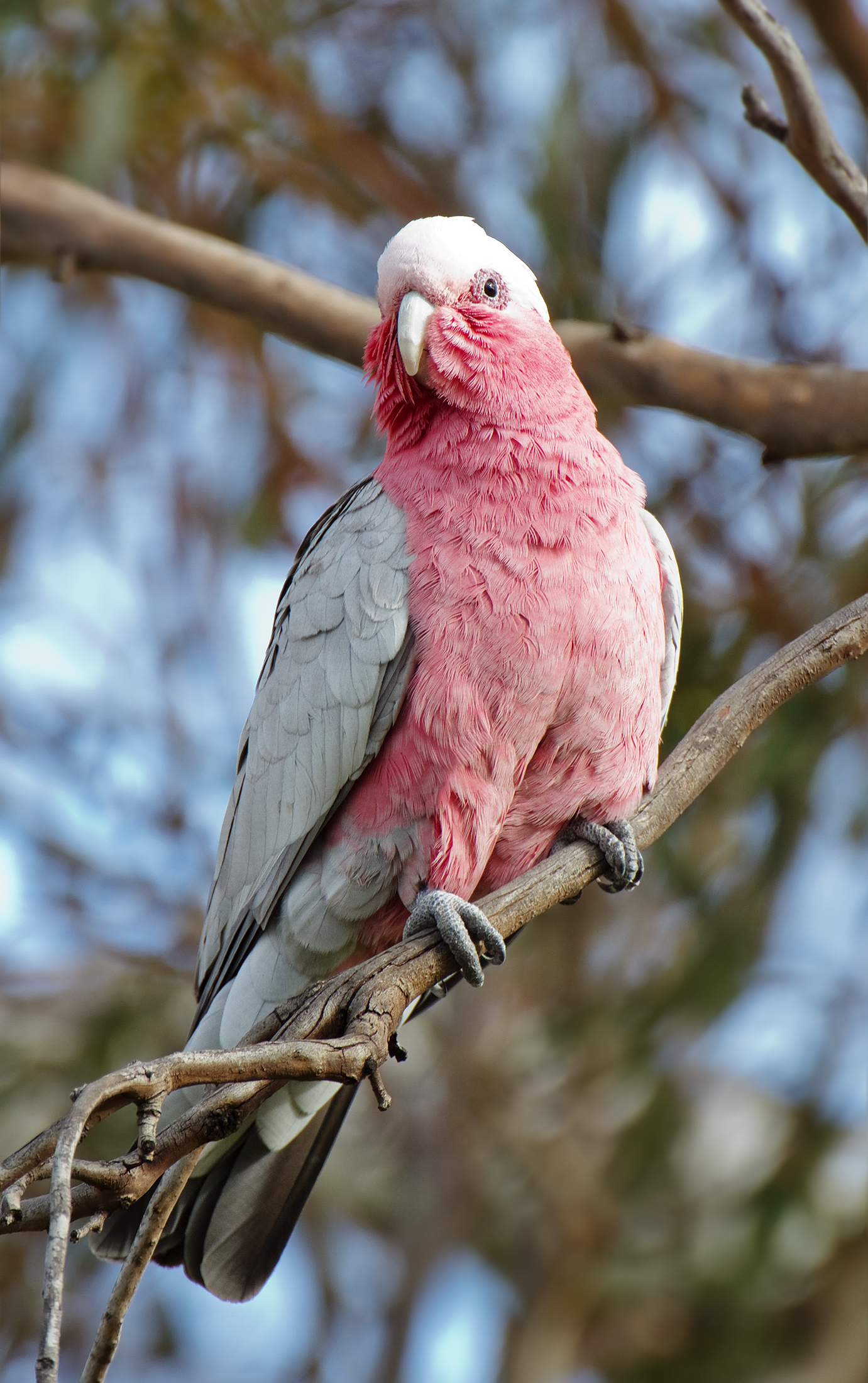
Male

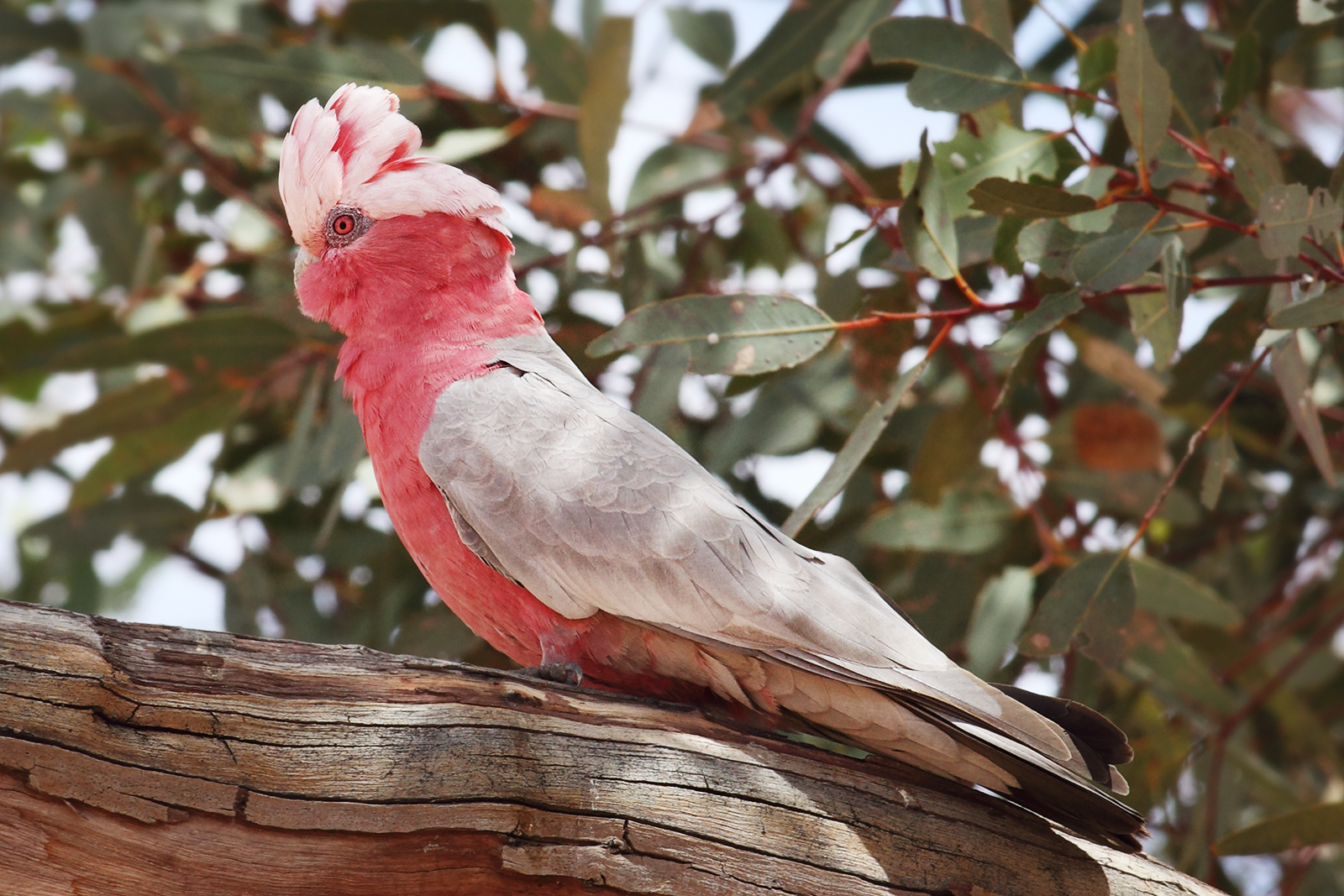
Female (note the reddish iris)

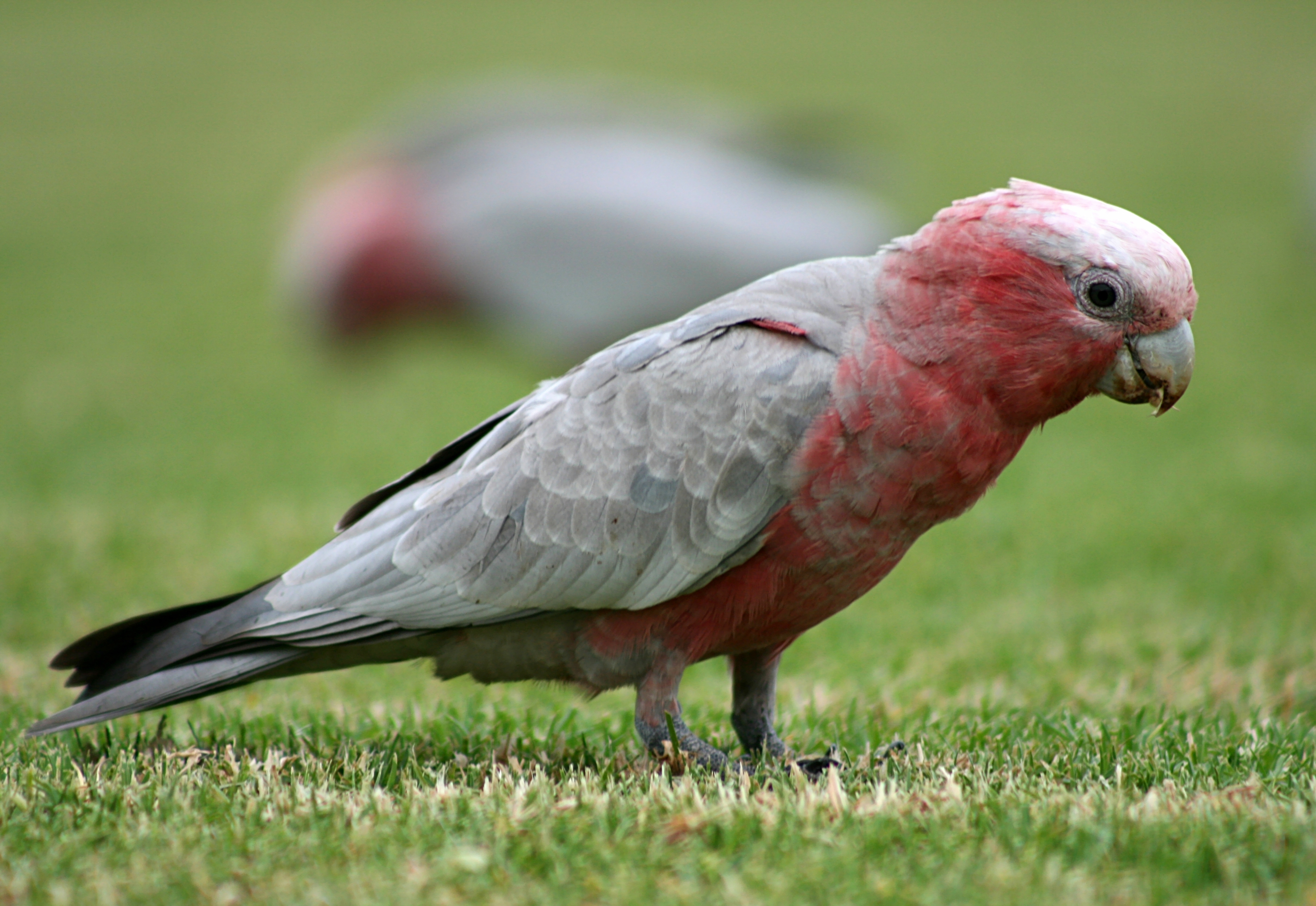
A juvenile in Sydney

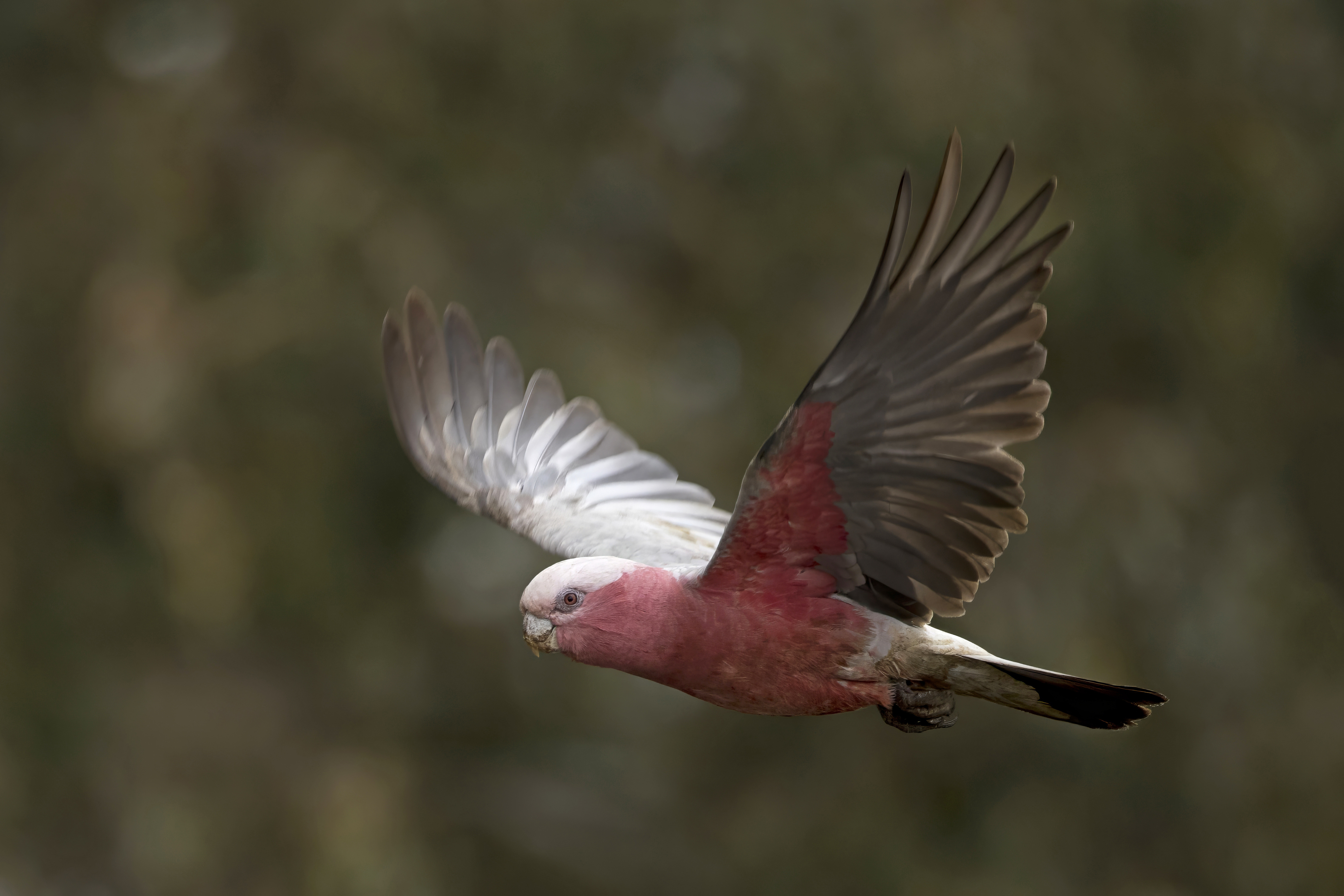
A female in flight

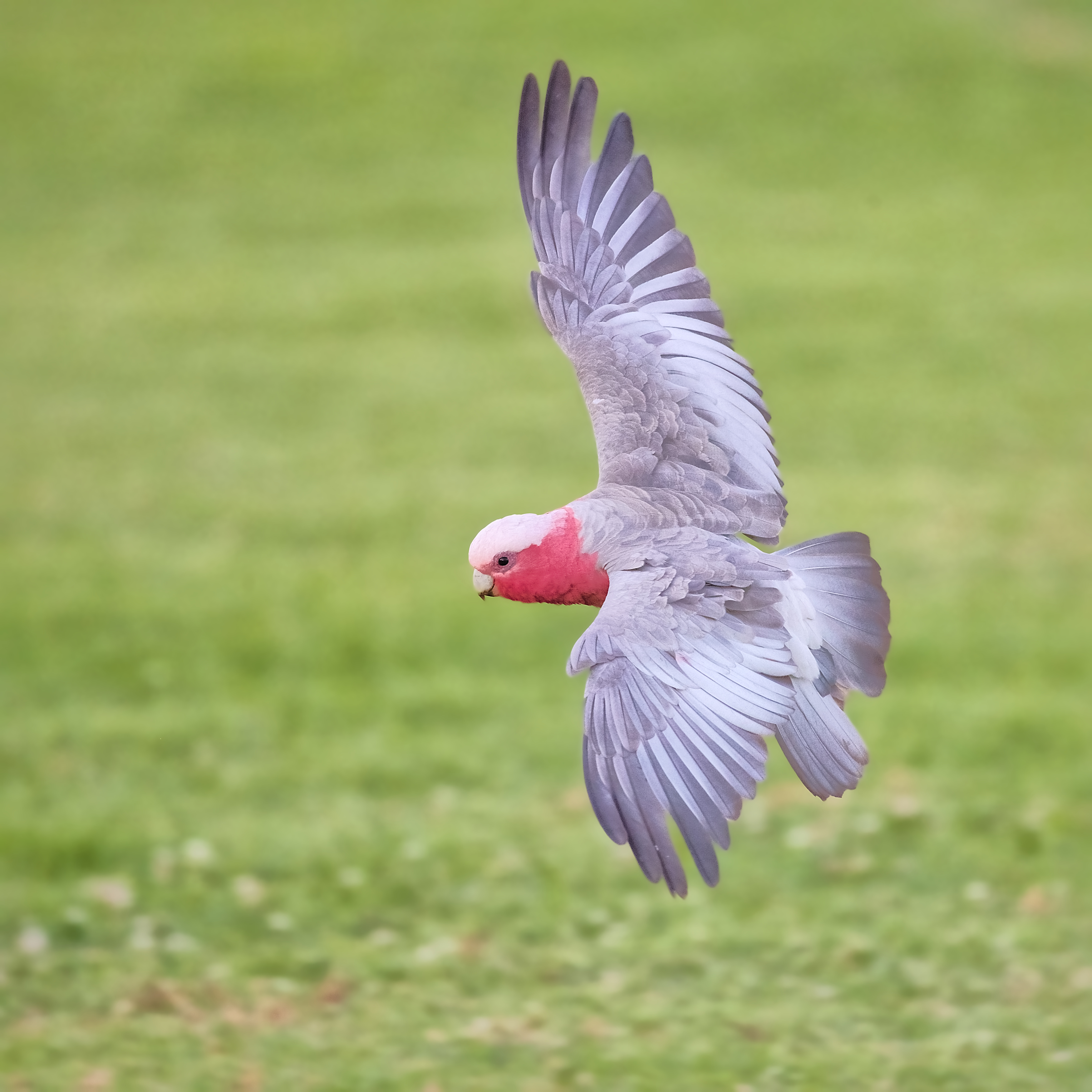
A male in flight

== Distribution and habitat ==
The galah can be found throughout Australia and is absent only from the driest areas and the far north of Cape York Peninsula. The galah was introduced to Tasmania through anthropogenic means and no sightings were made prior to 1848. A large population expansion occurred in the 1960s following many escapees from captivity. It is common in metropolitan areas, such as Adelaide, Perth, and Melbourne, and abundant in open habitats that offer at least some scattered trees for shelter. It is common in all habitats in its range except for dense forests, especially those with high rainfall.

While it is mostly found in inland areas, the galah is rapidly colonising coastal regions. The changes brought by European settlement, which have been disastrous for many species, have been highly beneficial for the galah, because of the clearing of forests in fertile areas and the provision of stock-watering points in arid zones.

The galah was also introduced to New Zealand in the latter part of the 20th century, becoming established in the South Auckland area.

== Classification ==
The classification of the galah was difficult. It was separated in the monotypic genus Eolophus, but the further relationships were not clear. Obvious morphological similarities are shared between the galah and the white cockatoos that make up the genus Cacatua and indeed the galah was initially described as Cacatua roseicapilla. Early DNA studies allied the galah with the cockatiel or placed it close to some Cacatua species of completely different appearance.

In consequence, the ancestors of the galah, the cockatiel and Major Mitchell's cockatoo, were thought to have diverged from the main white cockatoo line at some stage prior to that group's main radiation; this was indeed correct except for the placement of the cockatiel. Ignorance of this fact, however, led to attempts to resolve the evolutionary history and prehistoric biogeography of the cockatoos, which ultimately proved fruitless because they were based on invalid assumptions to start with.

It fell to the study of Brown & Toft (1999) to compare the previously available data with their mitochondrial 12S rRNA sequence to resolve the issue. Today, the galah is seen, along with Major Mitchell's cockatoo, as an early divergence from the white cockatoo lineage, which has not completely lost its ability to produce an overall pink (Major Mitchell's) or pink and grey (galah) body plumage, while already being light in colour and non-sexually dimorphic. The significance of these two and other characteristics shared by the Cacatuinae had previously been explained away in earlier studies by strict application of parsimony on misinterpreted data.

=== Subspecies ===
Three subspecies are usually recognised. Slight variations exist in the colours of the plumage and in the extent of the carunculation of the eye rings among the three subspecies. The south-eastern form, E. r. albiceps, is clearly distinct from the paler-bodied Western Australian nominate subspecies, E. r. roseicapilla, although the extent and nature of the central hybrid zone remains undefined. Most pet birds outside Australia are the south-eastern form. The third form, E. r. kuhli, found right across the northern part of the continent, tends to be a little smaller and is distinguished by differences in the shape and colour of the crest, although its status as a valid subspecies is uncertain.

== Behaviour ==
The galah is often found in flocks of 10 to 1,000 individuals. These can be mixed flocks, the members of which may include the pink cockatoo, the little corella, and the sulphur-crested cockatoo. The galah readily hybridizes with all of these species (see below). Flocks of galahs often congregate and forage on the ground for food in open, grassy areas. Flocks of independent juvenile galahs often disperse from their birth flocks haphazardly. The galah feeds on seeds gathered on the ground, mainly feeding in the morning and late afternoon. Idly, it will strip leaves and bark from trees, and large flocks have been observed to kill trees through defoliation.

== Breeding ==
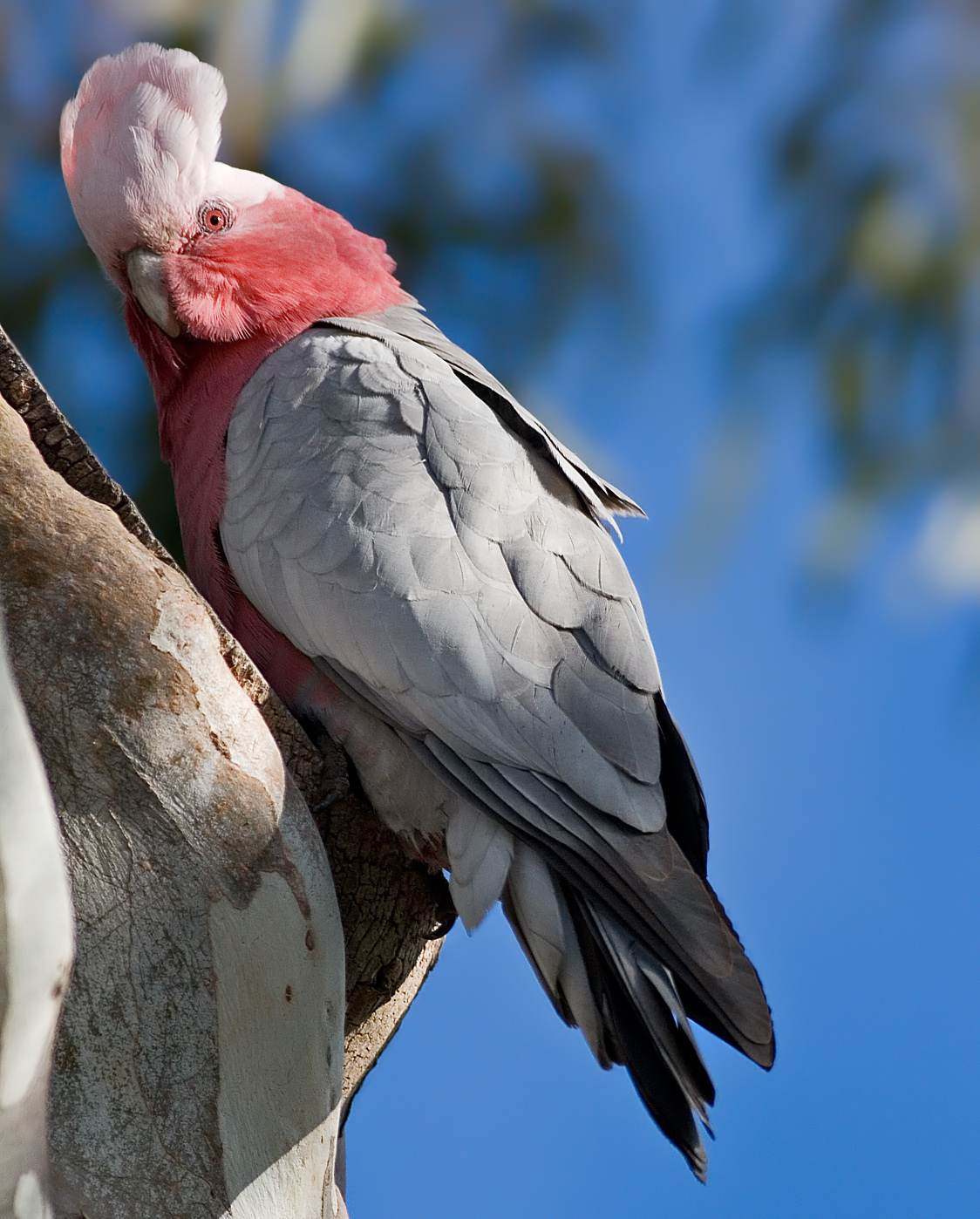
A female E. r. albiceps displaying her crest outside her nest in Tasmania, Australia

The galah nests in tree cavities. The eggs are white, usually two to five in a clutch. The eggs are incubated for about 25 days, and the male and female share the incubation. The chicks leave the nest about 49 days after hatching.

== Lifespan ==
Living in captivity, galahs have been recorded reaching up to 72 years of age when a good-quality diet is strictly followed. They socialise adequately and can engage playfully in entertainment activities to support the overall very intelligent nature of the bird. In their natural habitat, galahs are unlikely to reach the age of 20 years, falling victim to traffic, predators such as the little eagle and black and peregrine falcons, and human activities in some agricultural areas. Like most other cockatoos, galahs create strong, lifelong bonds with their partners.

== Hybrids ==
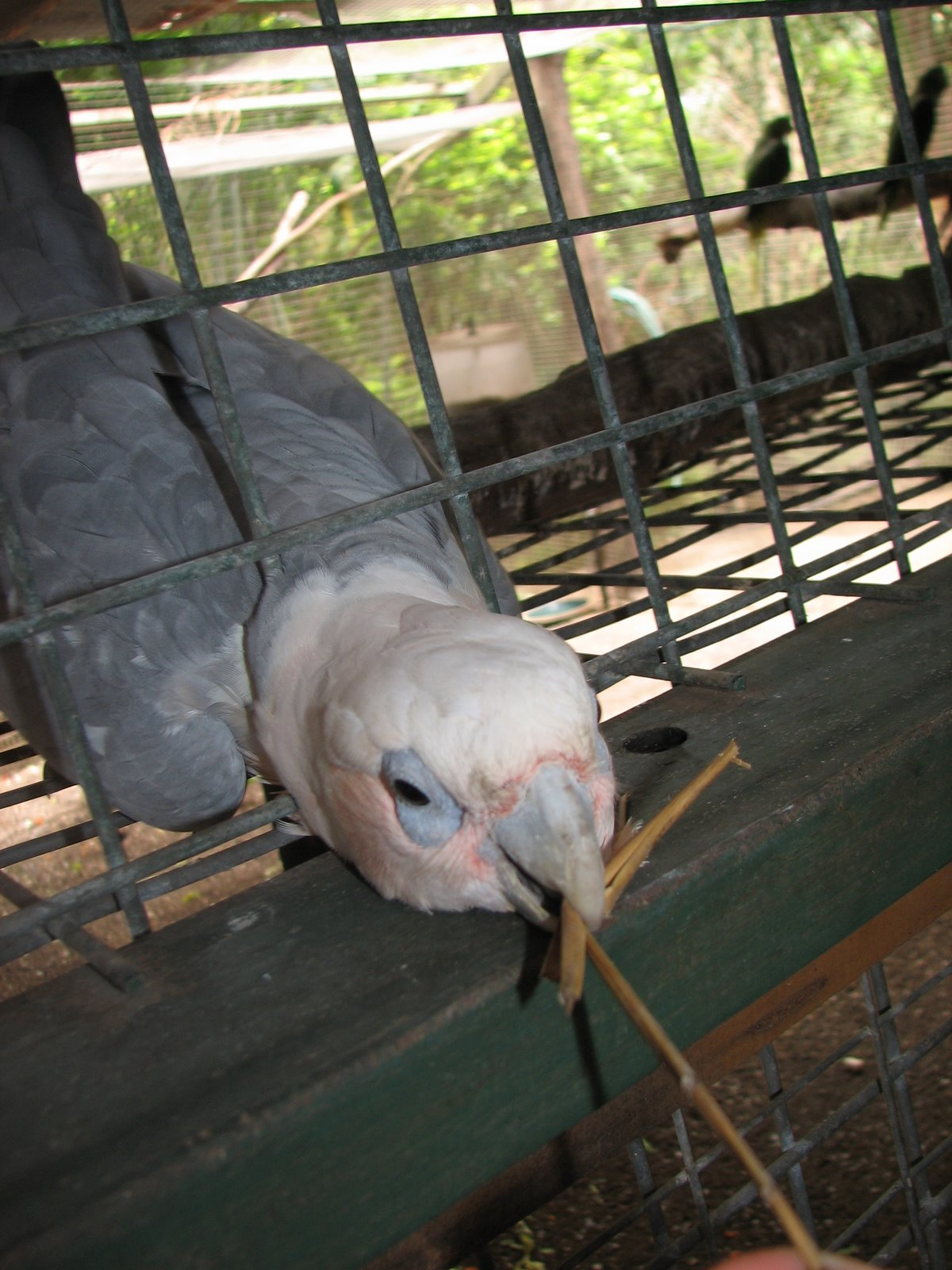
A galah × corella hybrid

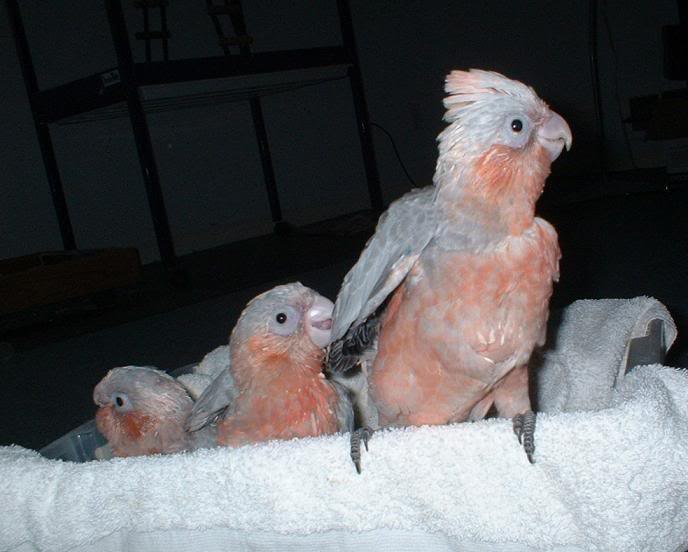
A young galatiel

The galah readily hybridizes with several species, including the sulphur-crested cockatoo, little corella, Major Mitchell's cockatoo, and cockatiel. Galah x cockatiel hybrids are often referred to as "galatiels". Aviary-bred hybrids of galah x Major Mitchell's cockatoo have been bred in Sydney, with the tapered wings of the galah and the crest and colours of the Major Mitchell's, as well as the plaintive cry of the latter.

== Relationship to humans ==
In South Australia, galahs are considered "unprotected native fauna" and may be shot (without a permit), trapped, or gassed (with a permit) by landowners.

=== Aviculture ===
The galah is very common as a companion parrot or avicultural specimen around the world. They are generally absent from Australian aviaries, although permits are available in South Australia to take a limited number of galahs from the wild per year for avicultural purposes. When tame, it can be an affectionate and friendly bird that can learn to talk, and mimic other sounds heard in its environment.

While it is a noisy bird that may be unsuitable for apartment living, it is comparatively quieter than other cockatoo species. Like most parrots, the galah requires plenty of exercise and play time out of its cage, as well as several hours of daily social interaction with humans or other birds to thrive in captivity. It may also be prone to obesity if not provided with a suitable, nutritionally balanced diet. The World Parrot Trust recommends that captive galahs should be kept in an aviary with a minimum length of 7 m (23 ft).

The breeding requirements include the use of upright or tilted logs with a hollow some 20–30 cm (8–12 in) in diameter. Sand and finer grades of wood material are used to construct their nest, the availability of eucalypt leaves for the nest lining is also suggested for captive breeding.

=== As food ===
The galah has historically been eaten by humans. Galah meat recipes were published in Australian newspapers in the 1930s, alongside jokes about the alleged toughness and unpalatable nature of the bird's flesh.

== Cultural references ==
"Galah" is also derogatory Australian slang of the early 20th century, synonymous with "fool", "clown", or "idiot". Because of the bird's distinctive bright pink colour, the term is also used to describe gaudy dress. A detailed description of the slang term can be found in the stand-up comedy performance of Paul Hogan, titled Stand Up Hoges. Another well-known user of the term "galah" is Alf Stewart from Home and Away, who is often heard saying "Flaming galah!" when he is irritated.

The Australian representative team of footballers who played a series of test matches of international rules football against Irish sides in the late 1960s adopted the nickname "the Galahs" after a disparaging reference to their uniform.

== Namesake ==
- Gulargambone, New South Wales
