= List of birds known as sulphur-crested cockatoo =

The sulphur-crested cockatoo (Cacatua galerita) is a relatively large white cockatoo found in wooded habitats in Australia, New Guinea, and some of the islands of Indonesia.

"Sulphur-crested cockatoo" may also refer to the following taxa:

- Greater sulphur-crested cockatoo (Cacatua galerita galerita), the nominate subspecies of sulphur-crested cockatoo
- Medium sulphur-crested cockatoo, an alternate name for the Eleonora cockatoo (Cacatua galerita eleonora)
- Lesser sulphur-crested cockatoo, an alternate name for the yellow-crested cockatoo (Cacatua sulphurea)
