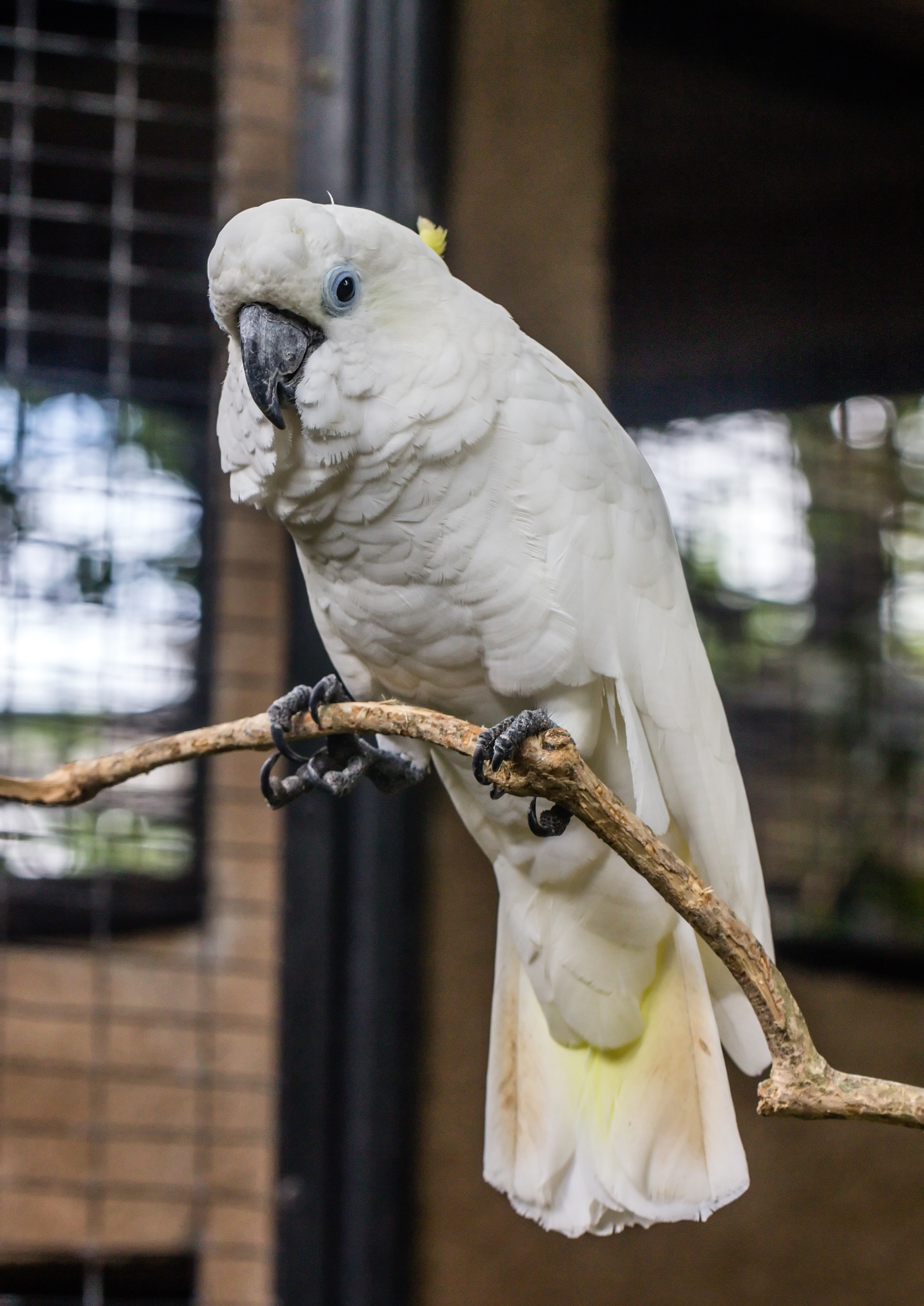

Scientific classification
- Kingdom: Animalia
- Phylum: Chordata
- Class: Aves
- Order: Psittaciformes
- Family: Cacatuidae
- Genus: Cacatua
- Species: C. galerita
- Subspecies: C. g. triton

Trinomial name
- Cacatua galerita triton Temminick, 1849

Synonyms
- Cacatua triton

= Triton cockatoo =

Subspecies of bird

The Triton cockatoo (Cacatua galerita triton) is one of the four subspecies of the sulphur-crested cockatoo. The cockatoo was first described by Dutch zoologist Coenraad Jacob Temminck in 1849. There is no documentation as to why Temminck selected this name; however, it is suggested that it was named after the Dutch corvette Triton, which operated off the Dutch New Guinea coastline in 19th century. A 2024 genetic study found that the Triton cockatoo is genetically distinct from the two Australian forms of sulphur-crested cockatoo and should therefore be considered a separate species, Cacatua triton.

== Description ==
It is white, with a large yellow crest that it can raise. It is 45–55 cm (18–22 in) long, weighing 550–600 g (19–21 oz) and can live up to 40 years. This subspecies differs from the Australian greater sulphur-crested cockatoo in that it is smaller, with broader crest feathers and has a pale blue periophthalmic ring instead of white. Its head and bill appear proportionally larger to its body when compared with the greater sulphur-crested. Although the Triton cockatoo is a larger and heavier bird than the Eleonora cockatoo, in practice, it may be difficult to visually differentiate between the two subspecies.

== Distribution ==
It can be found across most of New Guinea and the surrounding islands, including the Western Islands, the D'Entrecasteaux Islands and the Louisiade Archipelago. It can also be found throughout most of the islands in the western area of the Solomon Sea, with the exception of Aru Islands.

== Habitat ==
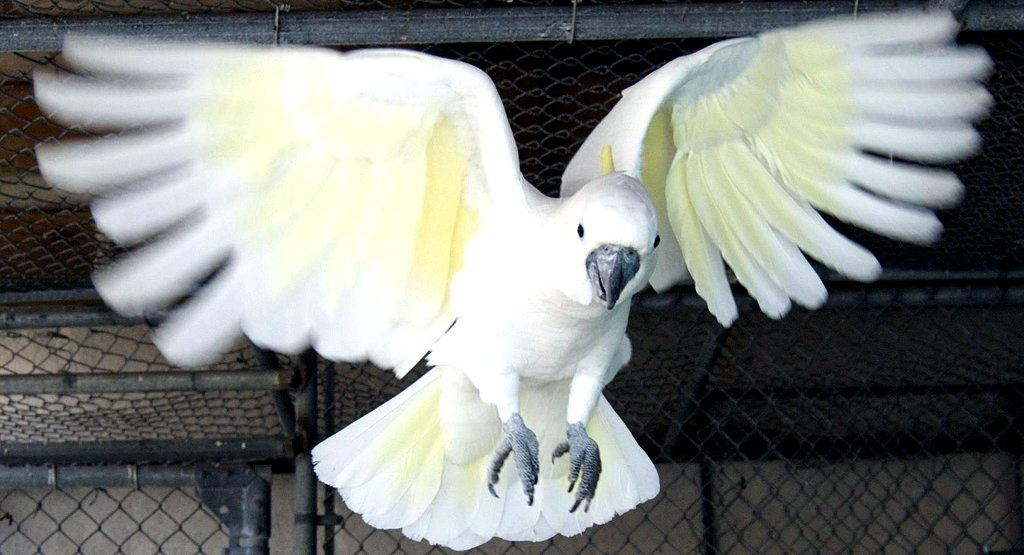
In flight

The Triton Cockatoo is almost exclusively arboreal and are rarely found in groups numbering more than half a dozen individuals. They prefer the thick jungle forest found on hillsides and whilst most are commonly found in lower and moderate elevations they have been found in forests 1,850 m (6,070 ft) above sea level.

=== Diet ===
They mainly eat seeds, fruits and occasionally insects.

=== Breeding ===
They are aggressive, solitary and territorial during breeding season, which is from May to September. It nests in tree cavities, like most cockatoos. They fill the nest with leaves and vines as padding and typically lay 2–3 eggs, which both parents incubate for approximately 26 days.

== Aviculture ==
Alongside the Eleonora cockatoo, avicultural populations of Triton cockatoo are well established in Europe and the United States and young, hand-reared individuals are available for purchase.

== In fiction ==
A Triton cockatoo, named Fred, features prominently in the 1970s US TV series Baretta as the pet of the titular character. In reality, two cockatoos named Lalah and Weird Harold were used during production.
