= List of Baretta episodes =

This is a list of episodes for the American television series Baretta.

== Series overview ==
Season	Episodes	Originally released	
Season	Episodes	First released	Last released
1	12	January 17, 1975	April 30, 1975
2	22	September 10, 1975	April 28, 1976
3	24	September 22, 1976	May 4, 1977
4	24	September 28, 1977	May 18, 1978

== Episodes ==
=== Season 1 (1975) ===
Note that producer and frequent script contributor Roy Huggins was credited as "John Thomas James" for all his writing work.

No. overall	No. in season	Title	Directed by	Written by	Original release date
1	1	"He'll Never See Daylight"	Bernard L. Kowalski	Stephen J. Cannell	January 17, 1975
After Baretta busts a small-time numbers racket, his girlfriend is shot and killed. He looks to come up with a plan that will allow him to seek revenge while making sure he stays on the right side of the law.
2	2	"The Five and a Half Pound Junkie"	Don Medford	Peter S. Fischer	January 24, 1975
When his childhood friend is murdered, Baretta tries to protect the pregnant widow and her unborn child from the killers, and from her own drug habit.
3	3	"Woman in the Harbor"	Bernard L. Kowalski	Story by : "John Thomas James"; Teleplay by : Robert I. Holt & Don Balluck	January 31, 1975
Baretta's best friend, a parole officer, is murdered after telling Baretta that a model who supposedly killed herself months earlier is alive and well in Mexico.
4	4	"If You Can't Pay the Price"	Bernard L. Kowalski	Story by : Tony Morgan; Teleplay by : Tony Morgan & "John Thomas James"	February 7, 1975
Baretta tries to nail a seemingly untouchable crime czar by placing the aging man under painfully overt 24-hour-a-day surveillance.
5	5	"Half a Million Dollar Baby"	Michael Schultz	Story by : "John Thomas James"; Teleplay by : Philip DeGuere	February 14, 1975
Baretta's career and reputation are almost ruined by a beautiful photographer (Ann Prentiss) who tricks him into helping her steal a half-million dollars of mob money.
6	6	"Ragtime Billy Peaches"	Bernard L. Kowalski	Story by : "John Thomas James"; Teleplay by : Don Carlos Dunaway	February 28, 1975
When the dead body of a prominent attorney's wife is found, Baretta becomes interested when he finds that there is no record of her existence before age 20.
7	7	"The Coppelli Oath"	Don Medford	Story by : "John Thomas James" & Michael Butler; Teleplay by : Michael Butler	March 7, 1975
After Baretta kills a drug pusher in a shootout, the man's teenage brother vows revenge.
8	8	"Walk Like You Talk"	Charles S. Dubin	Michael Butler & L.H. Whittemore	March 14, 1975
A committee on police corruption investigates Baretta after his partner takes a bribe in order to support his girlfriend's expensive tastes.
9	9	"The Mansion"	Bernard L. Kowalski	Philip DeGuere	April 2, 1975
After an undercover policewoman is killed, Baretta poses as a fugitive gangster in order to infiltrate a mansion that the syndicate runs as a house of illicit pleasures.
10	10	"Keep Your Eye on the Sparrow"	Don Medford	Paul A. Magistretti	April 9, 1975
Baretta begins to suspect that a rash of petty burglaries is actually the result of his mentally challenged friend's efforts to emulate Robin Hood.
11	11	"The Secret of Terry Lake"	Russ Mayberry	Story by : "John Thomas James"; Teleplay by : Philip DeGuere	April 16, 1975
Baretta comes to believe that a mobster is being framed for the murder of his boss when the man's girlfriend is too scared to confirm his alibi.
12	12	"This Ain't My Bag"	Jerry London	Story by : Gloryette Clark & Paul A. Magistretti; Teleplay by : Paul A. Magistretti	April 30, 1975
Baretta feels out of his element as he investigates the affluent friends of an heiress who has gone missing.

=== Season 2 (1975–76) ===
No. overall	No. in season	Title	Directed by	Written by	Original release date
13	1	"The Goodbye Orphan Annie Blues"	Bernard L. Kowalski	Story by : Paul Williams; Teleplay by : Paul A. Magistretti	September 10, 1975
Baretta comes to suspect that his close friend, a music store owner, may not only be a drug dealer but may be unknowingly selling heroin so pure that it's killing his customers.
14	2	"The Glory Game"	Jeannot Szwarc	Michael Butler	September 17, 1975
Baretta has to go on the run to clear his name after he's framed for the murder of a gun dealer he was investigating, who was selling weapons to teenagers.
15	3	"On the Road"	Jeannot Szwarc	Michael Butler	September 24, 1975
Baretta must use his wits to survive after he and a runaway girl he apprehended unwittingly get into a police car being driven by a couple of holdup men disguised as cops.
16	4	"Nobody in a Nothing Place"	Arnold Laven	Story by : Jack Turley; Teleplay by : Jack Turley & Robert van Scoyk	October 1, 1975
When a conventioneer is murdered, Baretta finds that the only witness is a busboy who doesn't want to get involved, but the real murderer is after the man too.
17	5	"The Fire Man"	Ted Post	Gregory Teifer	October 8, 1975
To find an arsonist, Baretta seeks the help of a former investigator who retired after suffering both physical and psychological damage in a fire.
18	6	"Double Image"	Jeannot Szwarc	Story by : Michael Simpson & Jeff Spielman; Teleplay by : Gregory Teifer	October 15, 1975
While Baretta is investigating a series of waterfront killings, his cover becomes in danger of being blown by a waitress who knows him and thinks he's responsible for the death of her boyfriend.
19	7	"Photography by John Doe"	Bernard L. Kowalski	Michael Simpson & Jeff Spielman	October 22, 1975
Persuaded by the grandson of a retired cop who had supposedly been killed in a fall to reopen the case, Baretta discovers a judge on the take.
20	8	"Set Up City"	Curtis Harrington	Michael Butler	October 29, 1975
To infiltrate a gang of jewel robbers, Baretta seeks the help of a former expert safecracker he once sent to prison.
21	9	"A Bite of the Apple"	Robert Douglas	Story by : Robert Janes; Teleplay by : Robert Janes & Paul A. Magistretti	November 5, 1975
When a dying hoodlum entrusts his girlfriend with a detailed record of all his underworld activities, she is sought by both the police and his former cronies seeking to protect themselves.
22	10	"When Dues Come Down"	Robert Douglas	Paul A. Magistretti	November 12, 1975
Baretta doggedly follows a truck driver he suspects of killing the cat burglar who injured his wife, waiting for the man to make a mistake that will reveal his guilt.
23	11	"The Big Hand's on Trouble"	Burt Brinckerhoff	Story by : Burt Young; Teleplay by : Paul A. Magistretti	November 19, 1975
Baretta is investigating a mob theft of diamonds belonging to Mr. Nicholas and winds up helping a merchant who is threatened by a new group in the neighborhood called the East Side Benevolent Society, which is forcing all the shop owners to pay money for protection or suffer the consequences. Burt Young, credited with the story for this episode, guest stars as Solomon.
24	12	"Count the Days I'm Gone"	Bruce Kessler	Story by : Robert E. Swanson; Teleplay by : Michael Butler	November 26, 1975
Baretta must find a prostitute's nine-year-old sister — a witness to the murder of Blind Bennie the hot-dog vendor — before the killers do.
25	13	"Sharper Than a Serpent's Tooth"	Charles R. Rondeau	Story by : "John Thomas James"; Teleplay by : Frank Dandridge & Robert Janes	December 17, 1975
When his partner is charged with shooting a suspect in the back, Baretta tries to locate the only witness who can save the man's career, but the real murderers are after him too.
26	14	"The Left Hand of the Devil"	Robert Douglas	Edward J. Lakso	January 7, 1976
When a plea bargain falls through, Baretta must infiltrate a murderous motorcycle gang to save his informant.
27	15	"Murder for Me"	Curtis Harrington	Robert Lewin	January 14, 1976
Baretta tracks a distraught father who has killed the doctor he believes responsible for the death of his son, then has gone after the local drug dealers as well.
28	16	"Pay or Die"	Robert Douglas	Story by : Donald R. Boyle & Michael Grais; Teleplay by : Michael Grais	January 28, 1976
After a crime lord is arrested, Baretta must jeopardize an undercover policewoman to stop an escalating war of succession between gangland factions.
29	17	"The Blood Bond"	Vincent Sherman	Gustave Field	February 18, 1976
Believing that Baretta pocketed $500,000 in stolen bonds after stopping a robbery, a mobster takes Billy hostage until the money is turned over.
30	18	"The Dippers"	Douglas Heyes	T. S. Cook	February 25, 1976
After a young pickpocket named Jonesy is killed, Baretta solicits the help of an expert to infiltrate a gang that operates at an airline terminal... not realizing that the reason for the death is related to the lifting of a passport from a hired assassin.
31	19	"Dead Man Out"	Robert Douglas	Story by : Mann Rubin; Teleplay by : Robert Lewin & Earl W. Wallace	March 3, 1976
Baretta risks his life going undercover as a prison inmate to discover why two suspects in a jewelry heist were killed.
32	20	"Death on the Run"	Burt Brinckerhoff	Paul Casey	March 17, 1976
Pursuing a gunrunner with spinal meningitis, Baretta becomes infected and has 48 hours to find the man and his cohorts before he has to go into quarantine.
33	21	"Aggie"	Vincent Sherman	Adrian Spies	March 24, 1976
A mentally challenged deli waitress who sees a narcotics cop commit murder allows herself to be persuaded that another man committed the crime.
34	22	"And Down Will Come Baby"	Bruce Kessler	Robert I. Holt	April 28, 1976
When a mother has second thoughts after selling her baby, she helps Baretta infiltrate a group trafficking in black market babies.

=== Season 3 (1976–77) ===
No. overall	No. in season	Title	Directed by	Written by	Original release date
35	1	"The Ninja"	Don Weis	Story by : Alan B. Cotler & Larry Alexander; Teleplay by : Larry Alexander	September 22, 1976
Baretta tries to stop a Japanese martial arts expert from taking personal revenge on the mobsters who murdered his daughter.
36	2	"Soldier in the Jungle"	Sigmund Neufeld Jr.	Story by : Gene Thompson; Teleplay by : Norman Lessing & Lewis Davidson	September 29, 1976
Baretta finds out that that hit man he is trying to stop from killing a local mobster may be one of his childhood friends.
37	3	"Runway Cowboy"	Robert Douglas	Milt Rosen	October 6, 1976
A photographer has taken photos which can clear a judge of any wrongdoing, and Baretta is on the trail to find him.
38	4	"Street Edition"	Vincent Sherman	Robert Hamner & Robert I. Holt	October 13, 1976
A persistent female reporter continually interferes with Baretta's investigation into the aborted robbery of a half-million dollars in syndicate money.
39	5	"They Don't Make 'Em Like They Used To"	Sutton Roley	Story by : Edward J. Lakso & S.S. Schweitzer; Teleplay by : S.S. Schweitzer	October 20, 1976
A heist goes wrong when Doc, an ex-con, is double-crossed by his hired hands during a jewelry robbery.
40	6	"Shoes"	Chris Robinson	Lewis Davidson & Tony Kayden	October 27, 1976
A rapist is on the loose and Baretta's only lead is "Shoes," a deaf-mute shoeshine boy who can identify the killer by his shoes.
41	7	"Under the City"	Cliff Bole	S.S. Schweitzer	November 3, 1976
Baretta finds trouble when he realizes that a prison bus has been hijacked by the prisoners and that hostages have been taken.
42	8	"Dear Tony"	Robert Douglas	Story by : Larry Alexander; Teleplay by : Norman Hudis	November 10, 1976
A story told mostly in flashbacks concerns the suicide of a policewoman whose officer husband was killed in a liquor-store hold-up.
43	9	"Crazy Annie"	Reza Badiyi	Jeff Freilich & S.S. Schweitzer	November 24, 1976
There's a slasher loose in Tony's neighborhood who is killing all the winos. Baretta is held captive by Crazy Annie, a.k.a. Mumsy, who thinks Tony is her son Arthur, which hinders his investigation.
44	10	"Nothin' for Nothin'"	Paul Stanley	Story by : Dennis Landa; Teleplay by : Dennis Landa, S.S. Schweitzer & Daniel B. Ullman	December 1, 1976
Baretta is working on a numbers case when $12,000 is stolen from Jewel, the rackets king. Baretta tries to help out a kid who was only trying to do good for his family.
45	11	"Can't Win for Losin'"	Robert Douglas	Story by : Irv Pearlberg; Teleplay by : Cornelius Ballard & Irv Pearlberg	December 15, 1976
Baretta is investigating the takeover of a new drug dealer in town who is knocking off the existing dealers. One Baretta's friends, Joey Rich, decides to take matters into his own hands after Joey's own son becomes a heroin addict.
46	12	"Look Back in Terror"	Vincent Sherman	Margaret Beddow Hatch	December 22, 1976
Baretta takes a three-day leave with his new girlfriend; problem is, her ex-boyfriend Bishop breaks out of prison and hunts her down for the security bonds she's holding.
47	13	"Don't Kill the Sparrows"	Don Medford	Alan Godfrey & Fenton Hobart Jr.	January 12, 1977
Baretta goes after a corrupt Federal narcotics agent who not only peddles drugs on the side, but murders the buyer who discovers he's a cop.
48	14	"That Sister Ain't No Cousin"	Bruce Kessler	Story by : Marc Stirdivant; Teleplay by : Cornelius Ballard & Marc Stirdivant	January 19, 1977
Baretta is after drug kingpin El Greco; too many kids are ending up dead, and the dealers are selling to younger and younger kids.
49	15	"Open Season"	Reza Badiyi	Dallas L. Barnes	January 26, 1977
A doctor turned bounty hunter vies with Baretta to find the pusher responsible for the death of a banker's addicted daughter.
50	16	"The Reunion"	Don Medford	Story by : Don Medford; Teleplay by : Christopher Crowe & Steve Meixell	February 2, 1977
After philanthropist James Simpson is blown up in front of the Genios restaurant, an old friend of Baretta's — a recovered alcoholic — returns to his old haunts to help solve the murder case.
51	17	"Not on Our Block"	Burt Brinckerhoff	"Sean Baine"	February 9, 1977
Elderly Teresa Montevanni is hit by a car from the "Association" protection collector. Baretta tries reasoning with the people of the neighborhood to rid themselves of their so-called protector Giove.
52	18	"The Runaways"	Don Medford	Richard M. Bluel & Pat Fielder	February 16, 1977
When Baretta rescues three runaways, one of them is a pregnant 15-year-old. Tony takes measures to nail her stepfather for raping her, abusing her, passing her around to his friends.
53	19	"Everybody Pays the Fare"	John Ward	Story by : Sidney Ellis; Teleplay by : Sidney Ellis & Leonard B. Kaufman	February 23, 1977
Baretta receives a deathbed statement from Canadeo about his father, Louis Baretta. Upon hearing that a hit had been put out on Louis, Baretta finds those responsible for his dad's death.
54	20	"Think Mink"	Don Medford	Story by : "Paul Tuckahoe"; Teleplay by : Richard M. Bluel & Pat Fielder	March 9, 1977
$200,000 in mink is stolen and the only witness is an old racetrack codger, who decides to get the reward money for him and his pal to go and score the big one at the track.
55	21	"Carla"	Alex March	Story by : Muriel Davison; Teleplay by : Margaret Armen, Richard M. Bluel, & Pat Fielder	March 16, 1977
Baretta rescues Carla from her mob family; the Feds want her to roll over on her family and put her into the witness protection program, while Tony just wants her for himself.
56	22	"Big Bad Charlie"	Don Medford	Story by : Bernard L. Kowalski; Teleplay by : Christopher Crowe	March 30, 1977
Baretta is working undercover searching for the Lu Chan gang from Hong Kong, who are responsible for a series of bank depository holdups. When newsstand operator Big Charlie helps, Baretta winds up killing one of the gang, making him a target.
57	23	"Guns and Brothers"	Bernard L. Kowalski	Story by : Don Medford & Ferde Rombola; Teleplay by : Christopher Crowe & Ferde Rombola	April 6, 1977
Baretta, investigating a stolen vehicle report, believes that two brothers are responsible. When another vehicle is stolen, this one filled with M-16s, the boys have more to worry about than just Baretta.
58	24	"Playin' Police"	Don Medford	Ray Hutcherson	May 4, 1977
Two shakedown artists posing as plainclothes cops are making a bundle ripping off other crooks — victims who aren't likely to go to the police.

=== Season 4 (1977–78) ===
No. overall	No. in season	Title	Directed by	Written by	Original release date
59	1	"New Girl in Town"	Paul Stanley	E. Nick Alexander	September 28, 1977
A mobster orders a hit on Baretta's new partner, a drug-sniffing police dog.
60	2	"Somebody Killed Cock Robin"	Reza Badiyi	Rick Kelbaugh	October 5, 1977
Insufficient evidence allows a man to be released from jail and resume his efforts to hurt a nightclub dancer.
61	3	"All That Shatters"	Don Medford	Sidney Ellis, Rift Fournier & Ed Waters	October 19, 1977
War veterans are blamed for a disabled man's bombing spree.
62	4	"The Sky Is Falling"	Don Medford	Richard M. Bluel & Pat Fielder	October 26, 1977
Baretta tries to save a teenage male prostitute who is being pursued by a killer after witnessing a friend's murder.
63	5	"It's Hard But It's Fair"	Jeannot Szwarc	Les Carter	November 2, 1977
Baretta poses as the trainer of former champion boxer Rudy Carmona to nail heroin kingpin Nicky Moss.
64	6	"Buddy"	Paul Stanley	Richard M. Bluel & Pat Fielder	November 16, 1977
Baretta puts his career at risk by sheltering an intellectually disabled teenager who he thinks has been falsely accused of killing his mother.
65	7	"Por Nada"	Reza Badiyi	Story by : Chris Lucky; Teleplay by : Chris Lucky & Miguel Piñero	November 23, 1977
An attack on the leader of a street gang and the murder of his girlfriend threaten to ignite a war in the barrio.
66	8	"Make the Sun Shine"	Don Medford	Robert Crais	November 30, 1977
His concern for an elderly amnesiac interferes with Baretta's investigation of a schoolyard drug pusher who is responsible for several overdose deaths.
67	9	"Lyman P. Dokker, Fed"	Burt Brinckerhoff	Alan J. Levitt	December 7, 1977
An FBI computer expert impersonates a field agent and joins Baretta on a case regarding stolen emeralds that belong to a sheik, and they wind up solving the murder of a prince who was involved with a deceiving belly dancer.
68	10	"It Goes with the Job"	Reza Badiyi	Robert Crais	December 21, 1977
Baretta does a lot of soul-searching after wounding a boy while trying to stop a holdup. Then he himself is targeted for revenge by one of the robbers who escaped.
69	11	"Hot Horse"	Don Medford	Story by : Joshua Shelley & Richard M. Bluel & Pat Fielder; Teleplay by : Arnold Horwitt	January 4, 1978
Two elderly neighbors of Baretta's steal a million-dollar racehorse back from the thief who originally took it, then hide it in their apartment until they can claim the reward.
70	12	"Why Me?"	Robert Douglas	Sidney Ellis, Alan Godfrey & Ed Waters	January 11, 1978
A woman who was attacked is so traumatized that she clings to Baretta and hampers his investigation of the robbery and murder she witnessed.
71	13	"I'll Take You to Lunch"	Don Medford	E. Nick Alexander	January 18, 1978
When his friend Billy is one of the hostages taken by robbers trapped at a roadside tavern, Baretta tries to negotiate a deal between them and a sheriff who is unwilling to concede anything because of his political situation.
72	14	"It's a Boy"	Paul Stanley	Les Carter & Warren J. Worthen	February 2, 1978
When a former girlfriend shows up with a baby named after him, Baretta plans to marry her until it turns out that she's a pawn in a power struggle between two mobs, with an assassin on her trail.
73	15	"Just for Laughs"	Reza Badiyi	Sian Barbara Allen	February 9, 1978
Baretta comes to the aid of a has-been comic trying to make a comeback, who has recently suffered several attempts on his life.
74	16	"The Marker"	Don Medford	E. Nick Alexander	February 16, 1978
Family loyalty compels a friend of Baretta's to agree to kill the man who assaulted an aging mobster's daughter.
75	17	"The Stone Conspiracy"	Don Medford	"Adrian Leeds"	February 23, 1978
On temporary duty with the vice squad, Baretta learns that his partner is taking bribes, and is ordered by his boss to investigate the other officers on the squad as well.
76	18	"The Appointment"	Bernard L. Kowalski	Sidney Ellis, Arthur Bernard Lewis & Ed Waters	March 9, 1978
A couple of small-time crooks known as Mutt and Jeff rip off a dry cleaner's owned by Tony's cousin Ellen, shooting and killing Officer Matthews. Tony is suspicious of Ellen's new boyfriend, concerned that he isn't who he says he is and is a part of the officer's death. Ellen is played by Sian Barbara Allen, who wrote (but did not appear in) the episode "Just For Laughs", which had aired exactly one month previously.
77	19	"Woman Trouble"	Bernard L. Kowalski	Robert Crais	March 23, 1978
Baretta tries to help a 12-year-old girl, who has run away from the orphanage, find her recently paroled father before he takes part in a jewel robbery.
78	20	"The Gadjo"	Don Medford	Story by : Ray Hutcherson & Miguel Piñero; Teleplay by : Ray Hutcherson	March 30, 1978
Baretta's young partner is ostracized by his Gypsy family for refusing to perform an atonement ceremony after accidentally killing his younger brother during a robbery.
79	21	"Barney"	Don Medford	Richard M. Bluel & Pat Fielder	April 6, 1978
Baretta goes undercover as a trucker to help the daughter of a murdered newspaperman pursue the hijackers who killed her father when he got too close.
80	22	"The Dream"	Reza Badiyi	E. Nick Alexander	May 4, 1978
Faced with a difficult kidnapping case, Baretta accepts help from a girl who appears to have psychic knowledge of the crime.
81	23	"The Snake Chaser"	Reza Badiyi	Rick Kelbaugh	May 11, 1978
A mobster who was badly scarred as the result of a shootout seeks revenge on Baretta.
82	24	"The Bundle"	Don Medford	Story by : Les Carter, Leonard Stadd & Toni Van Horne; Teleplay by : Les Carter	May 18, 1978
Two actresses, one of whom is Rooster's cousin, are in fear for their lives after a murder allows them to make off with $50,000 in stolen money.
