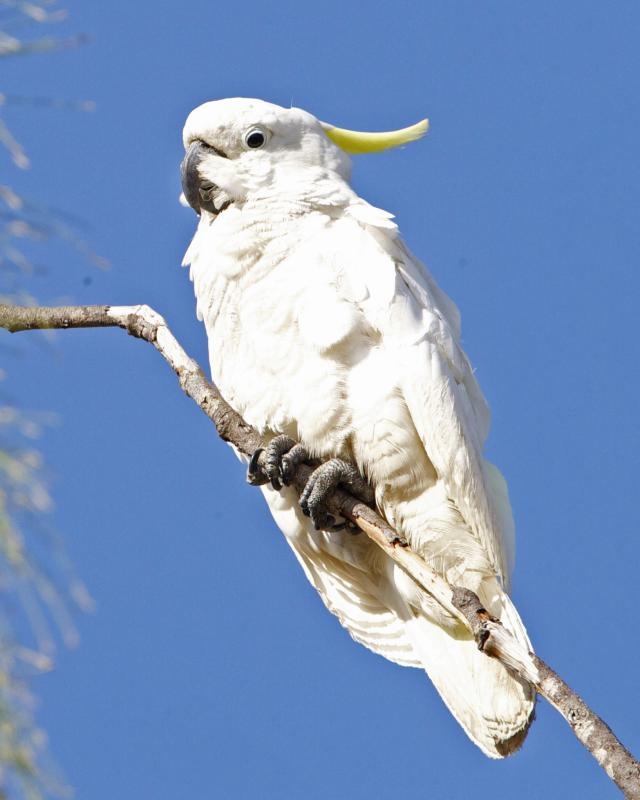

Conservation status
- Least Concern (IUCN 3.1)

Scientific classification
- Kingdom: Animalia
- Phylum: Chordata
- Class: Aves
- Order: Psittaciformes
- Family: Cacatuidae
- Genus: Cacatua
- Species: C. galerita
- Subspecies: C. g. fitzroyi

Trinomial name
- Cacatua galerita fitzroyi Mathews, 1912

= Mathews' cockatoo =

Subspecies of bird

The Mathews' cockatoo or northern sulphur-crested cockatoo (Cacatua galerita fitzroyi) is a subspecies of the sulphur-crested cockatoo. Its scientific name relates to the area in which it was first found, the Fitzroy River and its common name comes from Gregory Mathews, the Australian ornithologist who first identified it as a subspecies in 1912.

== Characteristics ==
It is white, with a significantly long yellow crest. This subspecies differs from the greater sulphur-crested cockatoo (Cacatua galerita galerita) in that they have a pale blue eye ring instead of white, the yellow feathers are slightly darker, and the crest feathers are longer.

== Distribution ==
It is distributed between the Fitzroy River and the Gulf of Carpentaria of North Australia. It is also common to Melville Island and some of the larger islands off the northern coast of Australia. During the 1930s the birds were released in Perth region, where there is now a considerable population.
