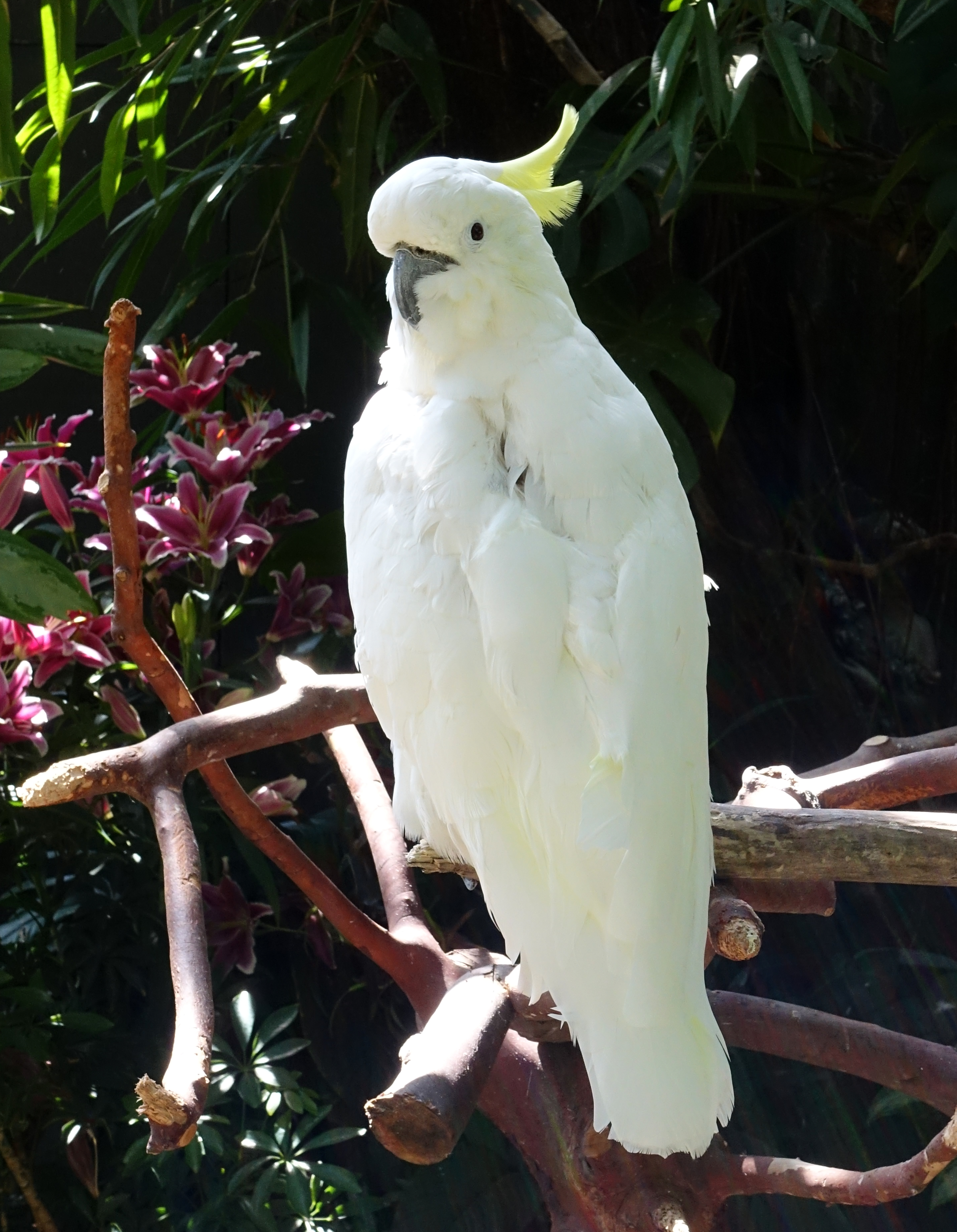

Scientific classification
- Kingdom: Animalia
- Phylum: Chordata
- Class: Aves
- Order: Psittaciformes
- Family: Cacatuidae
- Genus: Cacatua
- Species: C. galerita
- Subspecies: C. g. galerita

Trinomial name
- Cacatua galerita galerita Latham, 1790

= Greater sulphur-crested cockatoo =

Subspecies of bird

The greater sulphur-crested cockatoo (Cacatua galerita galerita) is the nominate subspecies of the sulphur-crested cockatoo. Its length is up to 50 cm (20 in) and weighs 0.91 kg (2 lb), making it one of the largest cockatoo species.

== Description ==
The greater sulphur-crested cockatoo is the largest of four sulphur-crested cockatoo subspecies, being significantly heavier than the closely related Eleonora and Triton cockatoos. Its head is white, with a long yellow crest on top of its head. Its body is almost entirely white as well, with a yellow tint on the terminal ends of their head and neck feathers, and on the underside of their wing and tail feathers.

They have a downward-curved black beak, which often appears grey from the white powder they produce for grooming. The sexes are nearly identical, with the only difference being the irises of their eyes, which are red in females and very dark brown in males.

== Taxonomy ==
The greater sulphur-crested cockatoo is also known by alternate names such as the yellow-crested cockatoo, white cockatoo, and cocky. It is of the family Cacatuidae and the order Psittaciformes, which include Old World parrots, African and New World parrots, New Zealand parrots, and cockatoos. The genus name Cacatua is of Malay origin, meaning "old father", likely due to their long lifespan and tendency to stay with the same flock for life. There are 21 species of cockatoos, with the greater sulphur-crested cockatoo belonging to the genus Cacatua, the white cockatoos, which has 11 species.

Of the four subspecies, it is most closely related to Mathews' cockatoo. Many of their genetic traits cannot be distinguished as exclusive to either one subspecies, and genetic diversity within one species may differ so much among populations that debate still exists on the degree of subspeciation. Since all cockatoos originated in Australasia, they are thought to have emerged after Gondwana's separation 55 million years ago during the Eocene. The vast diversification of cockatoo species likely occurred during the Miocene when the birds were dispersing along Australasia and as the Australian land mass was changing from a wet to arid environment.

== Habitat and distribution ==
The greater sulphur-crested cockatoo is native to eastern Australia from Cape York to Tasmania, and has been introduced to places like Indonesia, the Palau Islands, and New Zealand where it is considered a well established species. They avoid dry arid areas and instead can be found in temperate rainforests, wooded areas and woodlands, and shrublands. Their habitat range spans between 1,000,000 km² and 10,000,000 km², and they are abundant across this range.

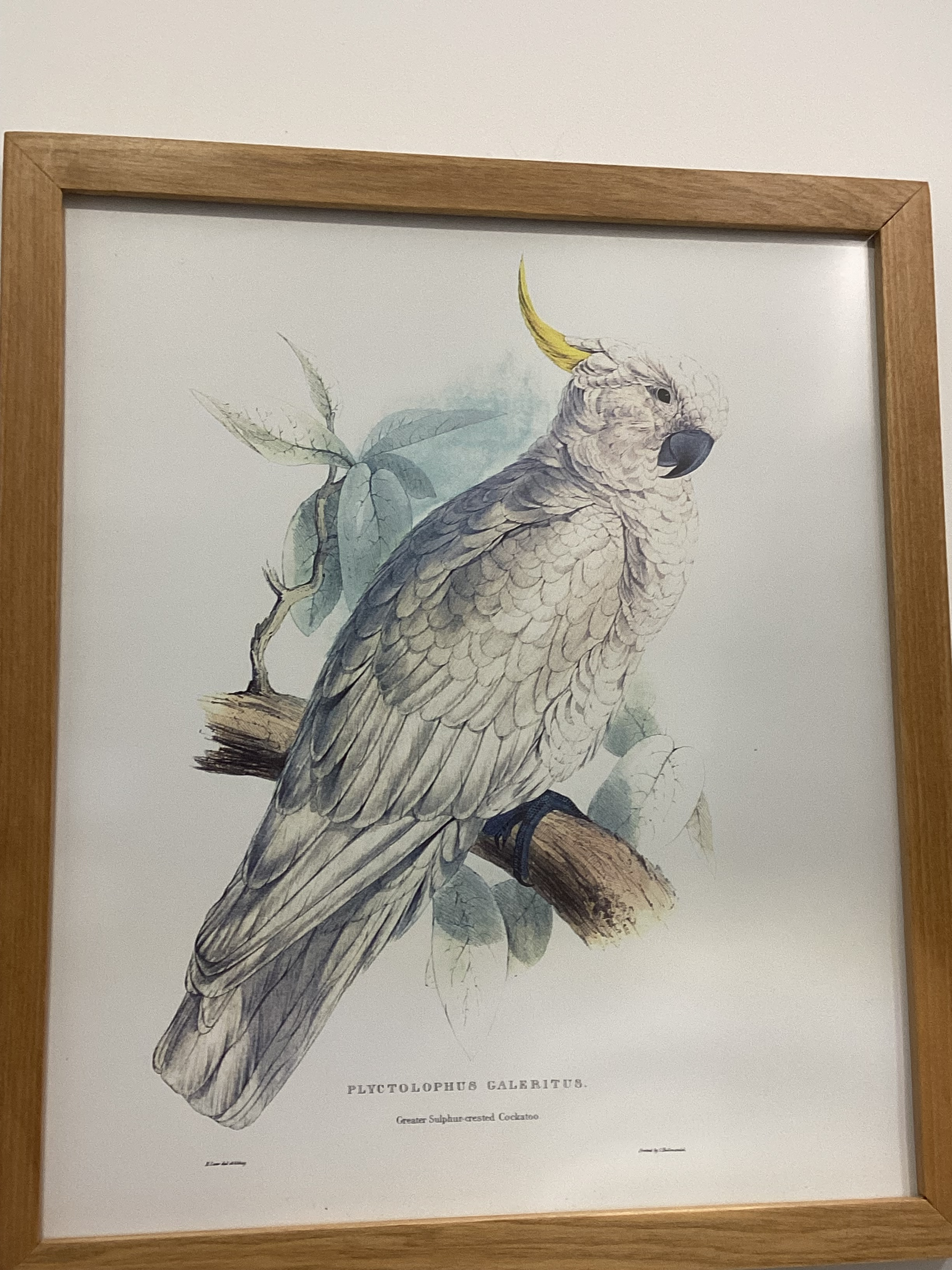
Greater sulphur-crested cockatoo painted by Edward Lear

== History ==
The bird was first collected by explorer Captain James Cook in 1770 on a voyage to Australia.

== Behaviour ==
Their lifespan averages around 80 years. They are fairly social birds, living in flocks that can have hundreds of individuals. They engage in mutual preening and are not migratory. Flocks live in their respective range and do not move areas or interact with other flocks nearby. During midday, they rest in trees, pruning and picking bark from branches. They feed in the late afternoon until the evening, when they return to their tree to sleep.

As of 2018, greater sulphur-crested cockatoos are listed as least concern on the IUCN red list, likely due to their large flock sizes and long lifespan.

=== Diet ===
Greater sulphur-crested cockatoos feed on flowers, seeds, grasses, fruits, and roots. They occasionally eat insect larvae. Since the early 1900s, they have been documented stealing crops and seeds from Australian farmers. A few individuals scout farms that have freshly sown seeds or plants that have just begun to sprout. They return a few days later with the entire flock to feed.

=== Reproduction ===
To breed, females nest in dead trees or tree hollows, laying one to four eggs per season. The males and females take turns incubating the eggs until they hatch around 28 days. Chicks are born with their eyes still closed, with pale yellow feathers, and remain in the nest until 11 weeks old. All chicks are born with brown eyes, which change colour at maturity based on sex. Very rarely does a flock leave their roosting site, so many populations have often been in the same area for generations.

=== Vocalisation ===
Like all cockatoos, the greater sulphur-crested cockatoo is a very vocal bird. Its typical call is a loud shriek, and when frightened, it emits a hissing sound.

== Aviculture ==
Greater sulphur-crested cockatoos are rarely seen in aviculture outside of Australia. In Australia, captive birds are typically individuals that were taken from the wild as abandoned or injured chicks or fledglings and raised by humans.They make a popular pet due to their high intelligence, ability to be easily tamed, ability to learn vocalisations, and long lifespan.

One particular greater sulphur-crested cockatoo, nicknamed "Cocky", was a popular domesticated bird at the London Zoological Gardens. He rose to fame in the late 1800s for being the oldest living bird, dying at 120 years old.
