= Baretta =

American detective television series

- Baretta title screen
- Genre: Detective fiction Police procedural
- Created by: Stephen J. Cannell
- Starring: Robert Blake; Dana Elcar; Tom Ewell; Michael D. Roberts; Edward Grover
- Theme music composer: Dave Grusin; Morgan Ames
- Opening theme: "Keep Your Eye on the Sparrow"; Sung by Sammy Davis, Jr.; Played by El Chicano
- Country of origin: United States
- Original language: English
- No. of seasons: 4
- No. of episodes: 82 (list of episodes)

Production
- Production companies: Roy Huggins-Public Arts Productions; Universal Television

Original release
- Network: ABC
- Release: January 17, 1975 – May 18, 1978

Related
- Toma

Baretta is an American detective television series which ran on ABC from 1975 to 1978.

The show was a revised and milder version of a 1973–1974 ABC series, Toma, starring Tony Musante as chameleon-like, real-life New Jersey police officer David Toma. When Musante left the series after a single season, the concept was retooled as Baretta, with Robert Blake in the title role.

"Keep Your Eye on the Sparrow", the show's theme music, was composed by Dave Grusin and Morgan Ames and sung by Sammy Davis Jr., in addition to being a chart hit for two other artists.

== Overview ==
Anthony Vincenzo "Tony" Baretta is an unorthodox plainclothes police detective (Badge #609) with the 53rd Precinct in an unnamed, fictional city. He resides in Apartment 2C of the run-down King Edward Hotel with Fred, his Triton cockatoo. A master of disguise, Baretta wears many while performing his duties. When not working he usually wears a short-sleeve sweatshirt, casual slacks, a brown suede jacket and a newsboy cap.

Baretta is often seen with an unlit cigarette in his lips or behind his ear. His catchphrases include "Don't do the crime if you can't do the time", "You can take dat to da bank" and "And dat's the name of dat tune." When exasperated, he occasionally speaks in asides to his late father, Louie Baretta. He drives a rusted-out Mist Blue 1966 Chevrolet Impala four-door sport sedan nicknamed "The Blue Ghost" (license plate 532 BEM). He frequents Ross's Billiard Academy and refers to his numerous girlfriends as his "cousins".

== Episodes ==
Season	Episodes	Originally released	
Season	Episodes	First released	Last released
1	12	January 17, 1975	April 30, 1975
2	22	September 10, 1975	April 28, 1976
3	24	September 22, 1976	May 4, 1977
4	24	September 28, 1977	May 18, 1978

== Cast ==
- Anthony Vincenzo "Tony" Baretta (Robert Blake), a police detective.
- Billy Truman (Tom Ewell), retired cop who used to work with Baretta's father Louie at the 53rd Precinct.
- Rooster (Michael D. Roberts), a streetwise pimp and Baretta's favorite informant.
- Inspector Shiller (Dana Elcar) and Lieutenant Hal Brubaker (Edward Grover), Baretta's supervisors.
- Detective Foley (John Ward), police detective.
- Fats (Chino 'Fats' Williams), a gravelly-voiced, older detective.
- Detective Nopke (Ron Thompson), a rookie detective.
- Little Moe (Angelo Rossitto), a shoeshine man and informant.
- Mr. Nicholas (Titos Vandis), a mob boss.
- Mr. Muncie (Paul Lichtman), the owner of a liquor store at 52nd and Main.

== Production ==
Upon watching Blake in the 1973 film Electra Glide in Blue, then ABC executive Michael Eisner contacted him about doing a police series, which culminated in Baretta. Blake was given creative control in most aspects of production.

The series came about as a reboot of Toma when actor Tony Musante chose to move on after completing his single season commitment to the series.

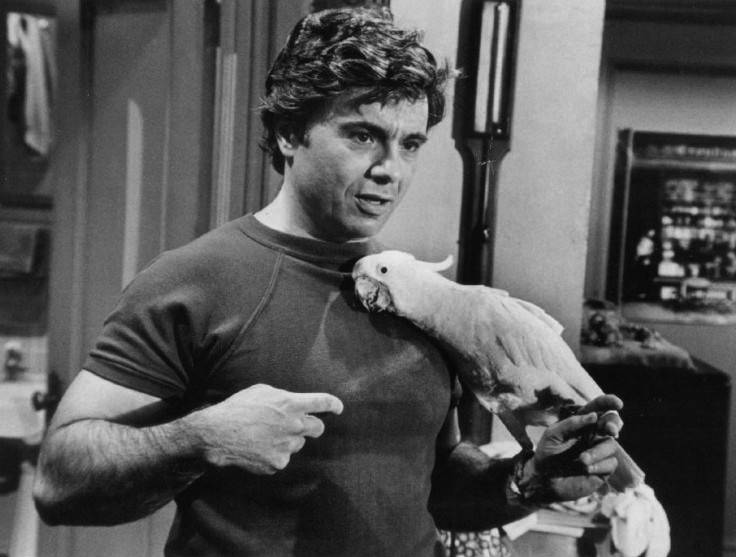
Baretta with Fred.

The theme song, "Keep Your Eye on the Sparrow", was written by Dave Grusin and Morgan Ames; initially an instrumental, lyrics were added in later seasons that were sung by Sammy Davis, Jr. Every episode of Baretta began with the song, which contained the motto, "Don't do the crime if you can't do the time." According to Blake, studio executives did not want Davis's vocals for the theme song for fear that audiences would think Baretta was a black series. Blake threatened to leave production if Davis's recording was rejected. His bosses relented.

The song was released as a single in Europe in 1976, reaching number one in the Dutch Top 40 as "Baretta's Theme". The music for the theme song was performed by Los Angeles-based Latin influenced rock band El Chicano. El Chicano also released the song as a 45 and as a track on one of their albums. The Baretta theme song by El Chicano was a huge hit in many countries including Turkey, Malaysia, Singapore, France and the Philippines.

The song was released as a single in the US, but only charted as high as #42 on the Adult Contemporary Chart, while it "bubbled under the Hot 100" at #101.

Fred the cockatoo was portrayed by two Triton cockatoos named Lalah and Weird Harold, the latter used as a stunt double for flying sequences.

== Cancellation ==
On April 27, 1977, Blake announced that he would leave after completing his contractual run on the show for the season. "I proved everything I had to prove," he said. Through his efforts, he said, Baretta became the only midseason replacement to win an Emmy.

"I put Baretta in the top 10, I tried to make a human being out of a cop and I tried to do a cop show and make social comment," he added.

In a 1996 TV interview with Tom Snyder, Blake stated that he hated being committed to the series and compared it to screwing a gorilla. "Baretta was a terrible experience," Blake stated, "you do a series so you can work with giants [in film]."

== Broadcast syndication ==
After its initial run in syndication beginning in 1979, the series later re-appeared on TV Land in 1999 as part of a package of series licensed from Universal. MeTV aired reruns of Baretta on Saturday afternoons in 2007. It was also aired on WKAQ-TV.

== Home media ==
On October 29, 2002, Universal Studios released the first season of Baretta on Region 1 DVD in the United States. On July 26, 2017, The Complete 2nd Season was released in the UK with French audio as the only audio option. The series has been rarely televised or even streamed since the late 2000s. Many have asserted that this is due to Blake's alleged involvement in the killing of his second wife Bonnie Lee Bakley, in 2001. Although Blake was acquitted of her murder, public opinion largely condemned him.

Release dates
DVD name	Ep #	Region 1	Region 2 (France)
Season 1	12	Oct 29, 2002	February 26, 2014
Season 2	22	N/A	July 26, 2017

== Cultural references ==
The June 1976 issue of Mad magazine spoofed the series as "Barfetta"; Blake himself often referred to the show by this title.

In Taskmaster Live, a 2016 show at the Edinburgh Festival contested by five television executives, Jeff Ford, the UK Managing Director of Fox Networks Group and SVP and Content Development Manager for Europe and Africa, described Baretta as a "lesser known 1960s vehicle".

In the Barney Miller episode "Copycat", Detective Arthur Dietrich tells a copycat criminal that cops and committing a crime are not like they are depicted on television, and ends by saying, "And dat's the name of dat tune."

In the film Reservoir Dogs, protagonist Mr. Orange steels himself before meeting main antagonist Joe Cabot by saying "You're not gonna get hurt. You're fucking Baretta. They believe every fucking word 'cause you're super cool."

In the sitcom That '70s Show, in the season one episode “Stolen Car”, Bob Pinciotti tells his wife Midge, "you can't tell me anything while I'm watching Baretta, it's complicated."

In the Party Down episode "Investors Dinner" (2009), the opening scene is an argument about why Tony Baretta is named so, with two characters arguing that it's because he carries a Beretta pistol.
