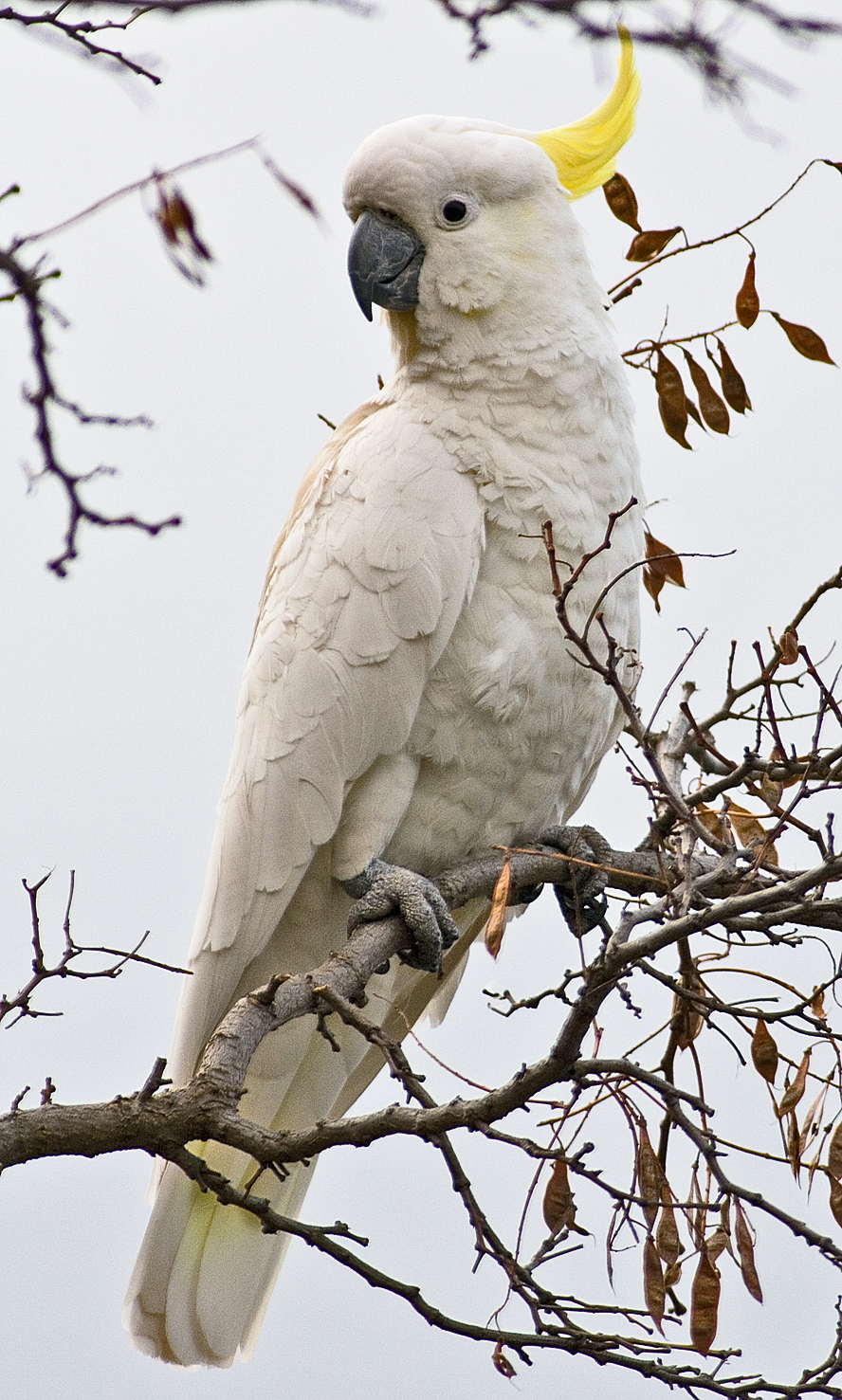
- C. g. galerita in Tasmania, Australia

Conservation status
- Least Concern (IUCN 3.1)
- CITES Appendix II

Scientific classification
- Kingdom: Animalia
- Phylum: Chordata
- Class: Aves
- Order: Psittaciformes
- Family: Cacatuidae
- Genus: Cacatua
- Subgenus: Cacatua
- Species: C. galerita

Binomial name
- Cacatua galerita (Latham, 1790)
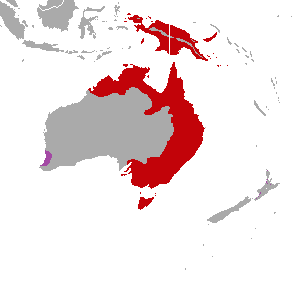
- Silver-crested cockatoo range (in red), introduced range (in violet)

= Sulphur-crested cockatoo =

Sulphur-crested cockatoo Temporal range: Pleistocene – present

Species of bird

The sulphur-crested cockatoo (Cacatua galerita) is a relatively large white cockatoo found in wooded habitats in Australia, New Guinea, and some of the islands of Indonesia. They can be locally very numerous, leading to them sometimes being considered pests. As highly intelligent birds, they are well known in aviculture, although they can be demanding pets.

== Subspecies ==
The four recognised subspecies are:

Image	Scientific name	Common name	Distribution
	C. g. triton Temminck, 1849	Triton cockatoo	Found in New Guinea and the surrounding islands
	C. g. eleonora Finsch, 1863	Eleonora cockatoo	Restricted to the Aru Islands in the Maluku province of eastern Indonesia
	C. g. fitzroyi (Mathews, 1912)	Mathews cockatoo	Northern Australia from West Australia to the Gulf of Carpentaria
	C. g. galerita (Latham 1790)	Greater sulphur-crested cockatoo	Found from Cape York to Tasmania

A 2024 genetic study found that the Triton cockatoo is genetically distinct from the two Australian forms of sulphur-crested cockatoos, so should be considered a separate species, Cacatua triton.

== Distribution ==
The species is native to large parts of Australia, Indonesia, and Papua New Guinea. Within Australia, sulphur-crested cockatoos of the nominate race have also been introduced to Perth, which is far outside their natural range. Outside Australia, they have been introduced to Singapore, where their numbers have been estimated to be between 500 and 2000. They have also been introduced to Palau and New Zealand. In New Zealand, the introduced populations may number fewer than 1000. This species has also been recorded as established in Hawaii and from various islands in Wallacea (e.g. Kai Islands and Ambon), but if it has managed to become established there is unclear.

== Description ==
In the Bushland Shire, northern suburban Sydney

Sulphur-crested cockatoos are 44–55 cm (17.5–21.5 in) long, with the Australian subspecies larger than subspecies from New Guinea and nearby islands. Their plumage is overall white, while the underwing and -tail are tinged yellow. The expressive crest is yellow. The bill is black, the legs are grey, and the eye-ring is whitish. Males typically have almost black eyes, whereas the females have more red or brown eyes, but this requires optimum viewing conditions to be seen. The differences between the subspecies are subtle. C. g. fitzroyi is similar to the nominate race, but lacks the yellow on the ear tufts and has slightly blueish skin around the eye. C. g. eleonora is similar to C. g. fitzroyi but is smaller and has broader feathers in the crest, and C. g. triton is similar to C. g. eleonora except it has a smaller bill.

It is similar in appearance to the three species of corellas found in Australia, but corellas are smaller, lack the prominent yellow crest, and have pale bills. In captivity, the sulphur-crested cockatoo is easily confused with the smaller yellow-crested cockatoo or the blue-eyed cockatoo with a differently shaped crest and a darker blue eye ring.

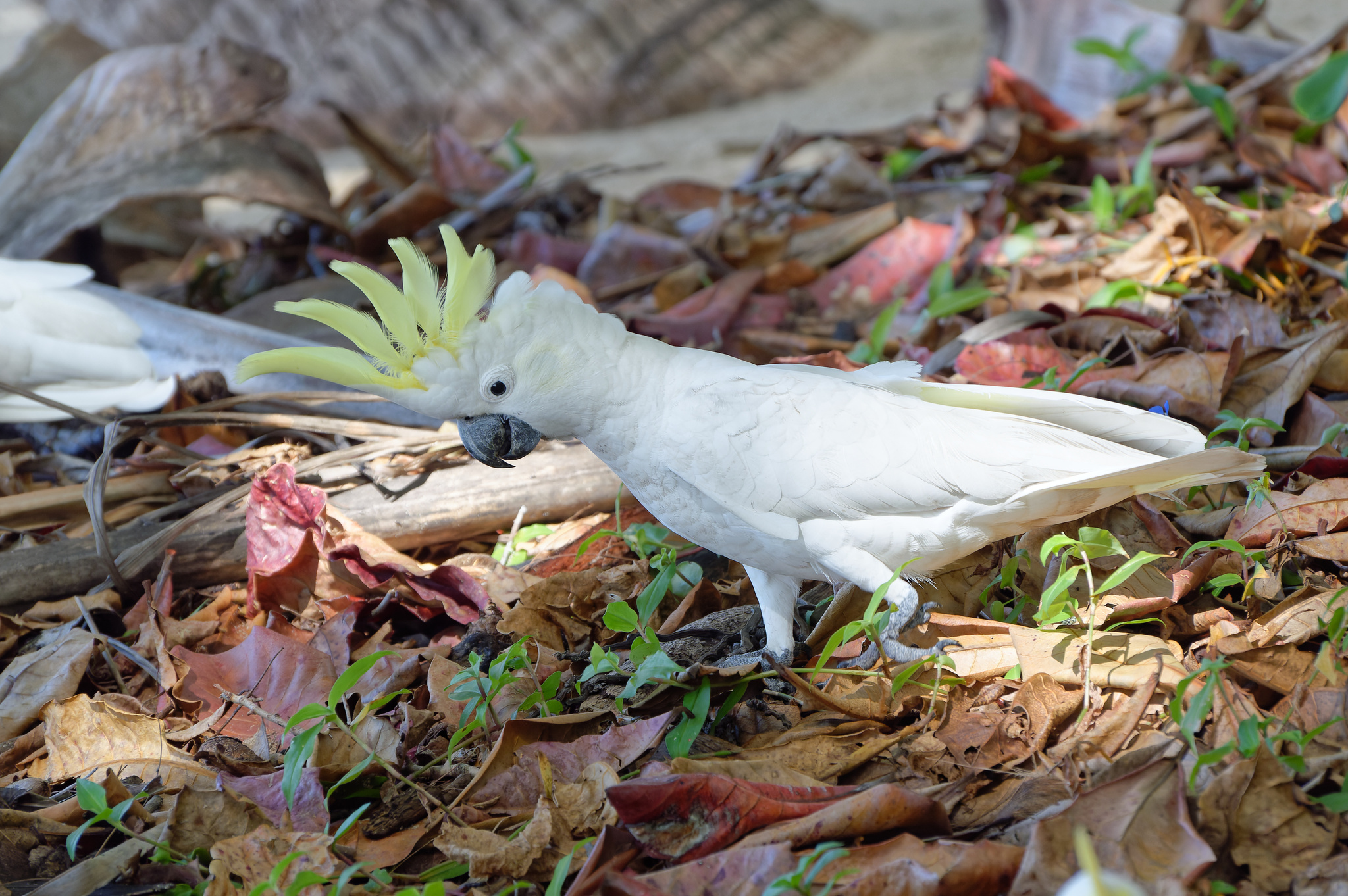
In Queensland, with fully extended crest

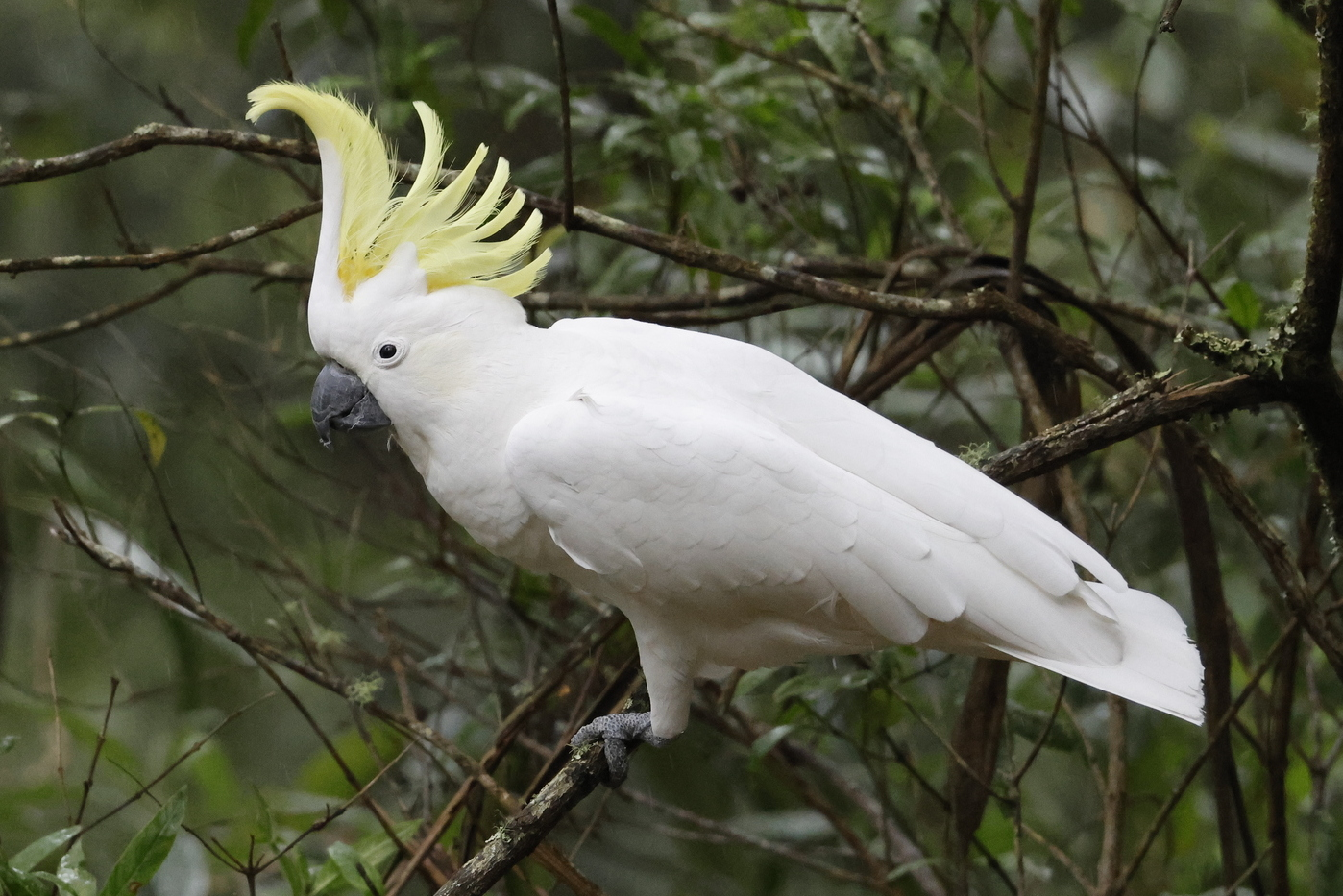
In Victoria

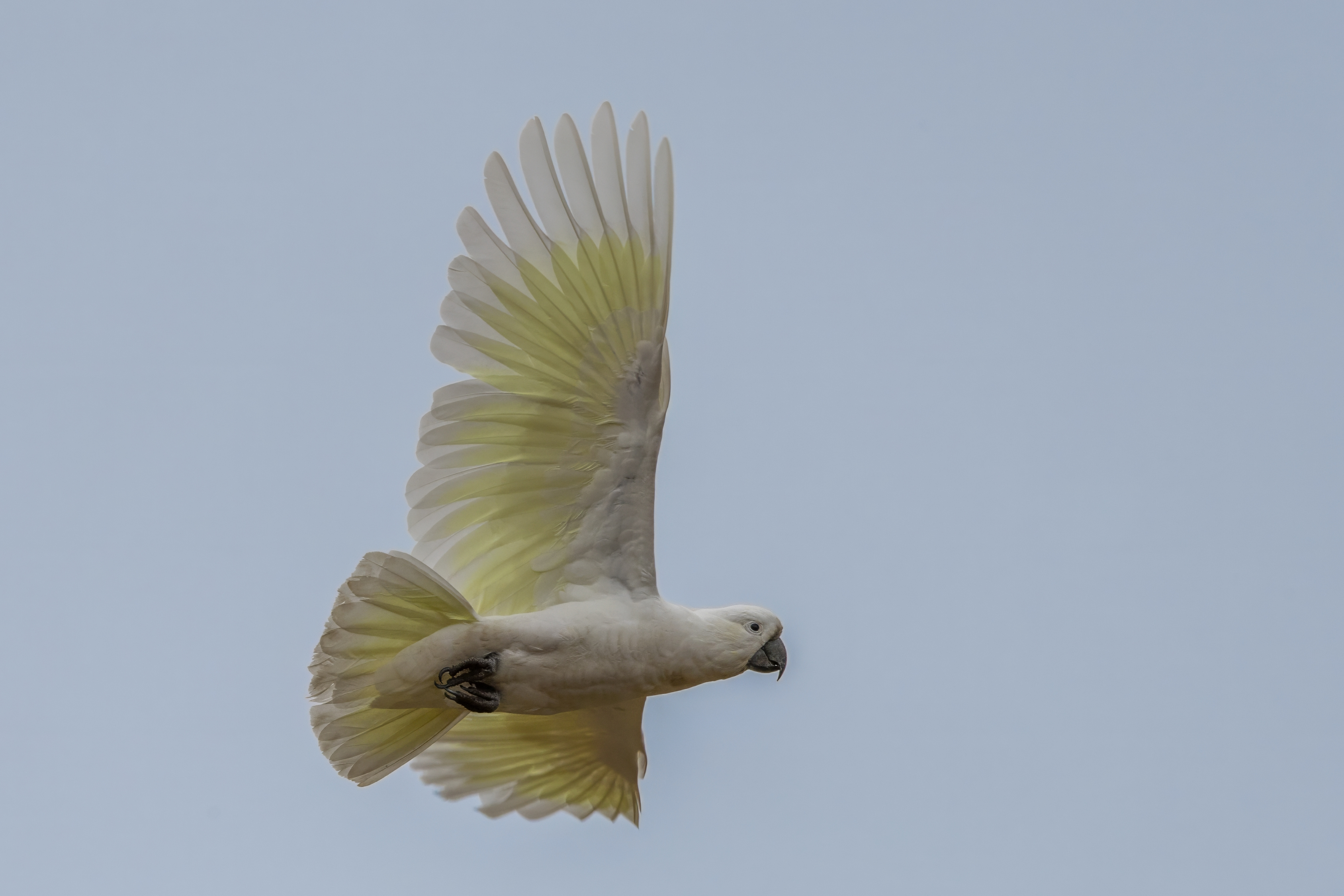
In South Australia

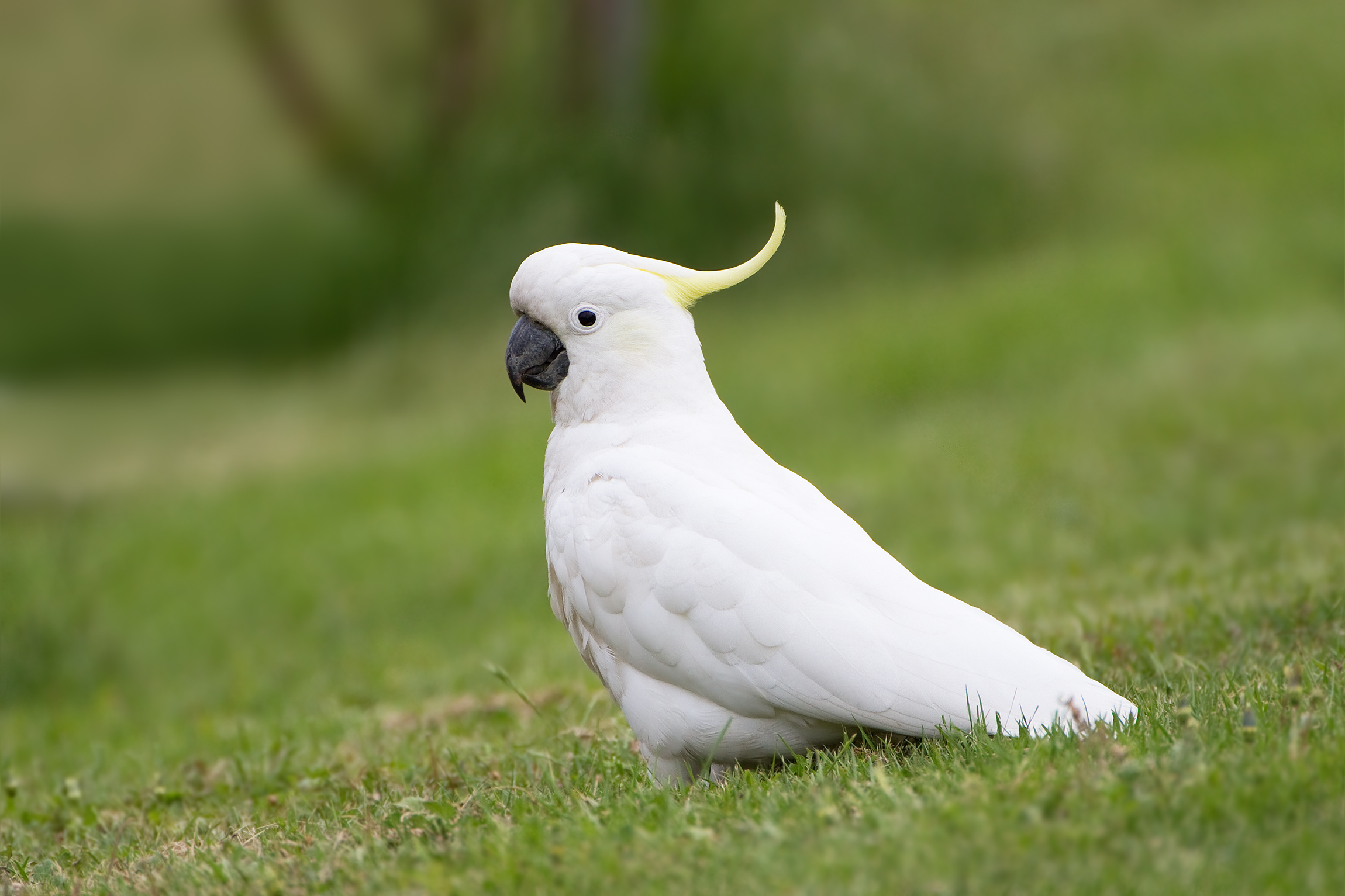
In Tasmania

== Behaviour ==
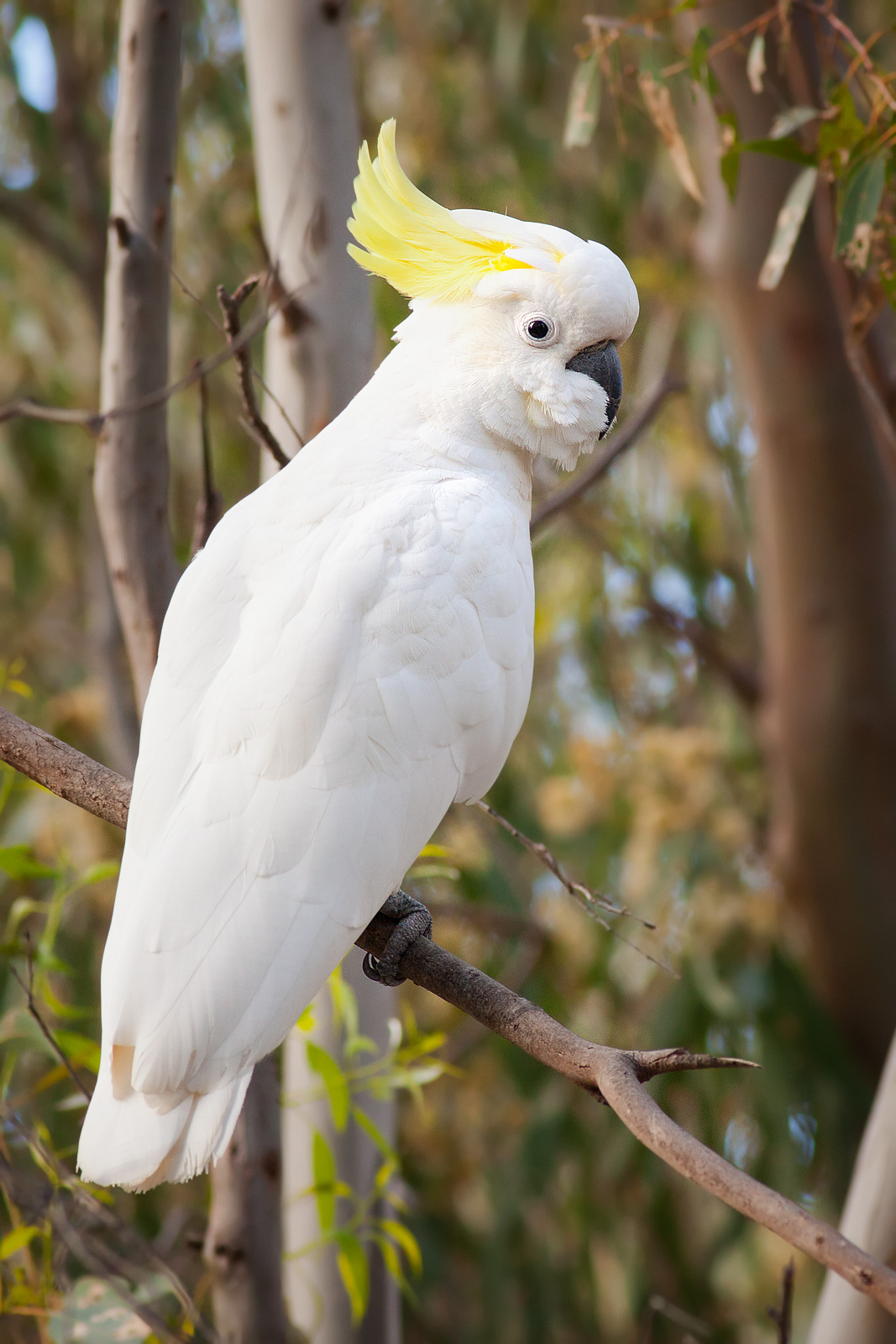
Perched on a tree in Victoria

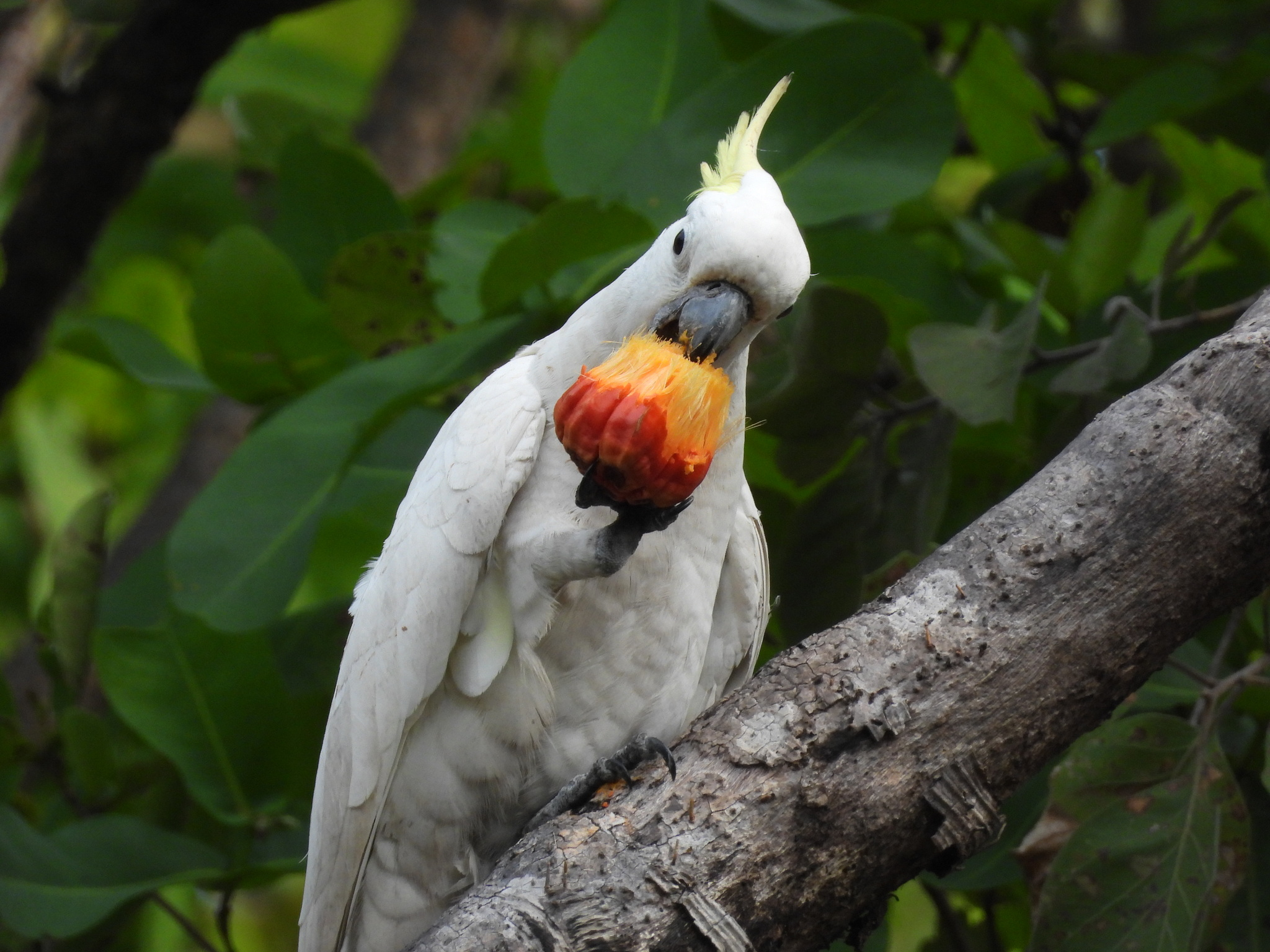
Feeding on Pandanus fruit, Northern Territory

Sulphur-crested cockatoos' distinctive, raucous calls can be very loud, which is a result of an adaptation to travel through the forest environments in which they live, including tropical and subtropical rainforests. These birds are naturally curious, as well as very intelligent. They have adapted very well to European settlement in Australia and live in many urban areas.

Being intelligent, in Sydney, Australia, they have learned how to open garbage bins as a source of food. The behaviour spreads among the birds by imitation. In captivity some will spontaneously dance to music with a variety of unique moves.

These birds are very long-lived, upwards of 70 years in captivity, although they only live to about 20–40 years in the wild. They have been known to engage in geophagy, the process of eating clay to detoxify their food. These birds produce a very fine powder to waterproof themselves instead of oil as many other birds do.

The sulphur-crested cockatoo is a seasonal breeder in Australia; little is known about its breeding behaviour in New Guinea. In southern Australia, the breeding season is from August to January, whereas in northern Australia, the season is from May to September. The nest is a bed of wood chips in a hollow in a tree. Like many other parrots, it competes with others of its species and with other species for nesting sites. Two to three eggs are laid and incubation lasts between 25 and 27 days. Both parents incubate the eggs and raise the nestlings. The nestling period is between 9 and 12 weeks, and the young fledglings remain with their parents for a number of months after fledging.

Sulphur-crested cockatoos have a range of visually observable expressions. A 2009 study involving an Eleonora cockatoo (the subspecies C. g. eleonora) named Snowball found that sulphur-crested cockatoos are capable of synchronising movements to a musical beat. Sulphur-crested cockatoos use facial expressions (with their feathers) to indicate positive emotions.

Species that feed on the ground are very vulnerable to predator attack. The cockatoo has evolved a behavioural adaptation to protect against this: whenever a flock is on the ground, at least one is high up in a tree (usually a dead tree), keeping guard. This is so well known that it has even entered Australian slang; a person keeping guard for sudden police raids on illegal gambling gatherings is referred to as a "cockatoo" or "cocky" for short.

== Pest status ==
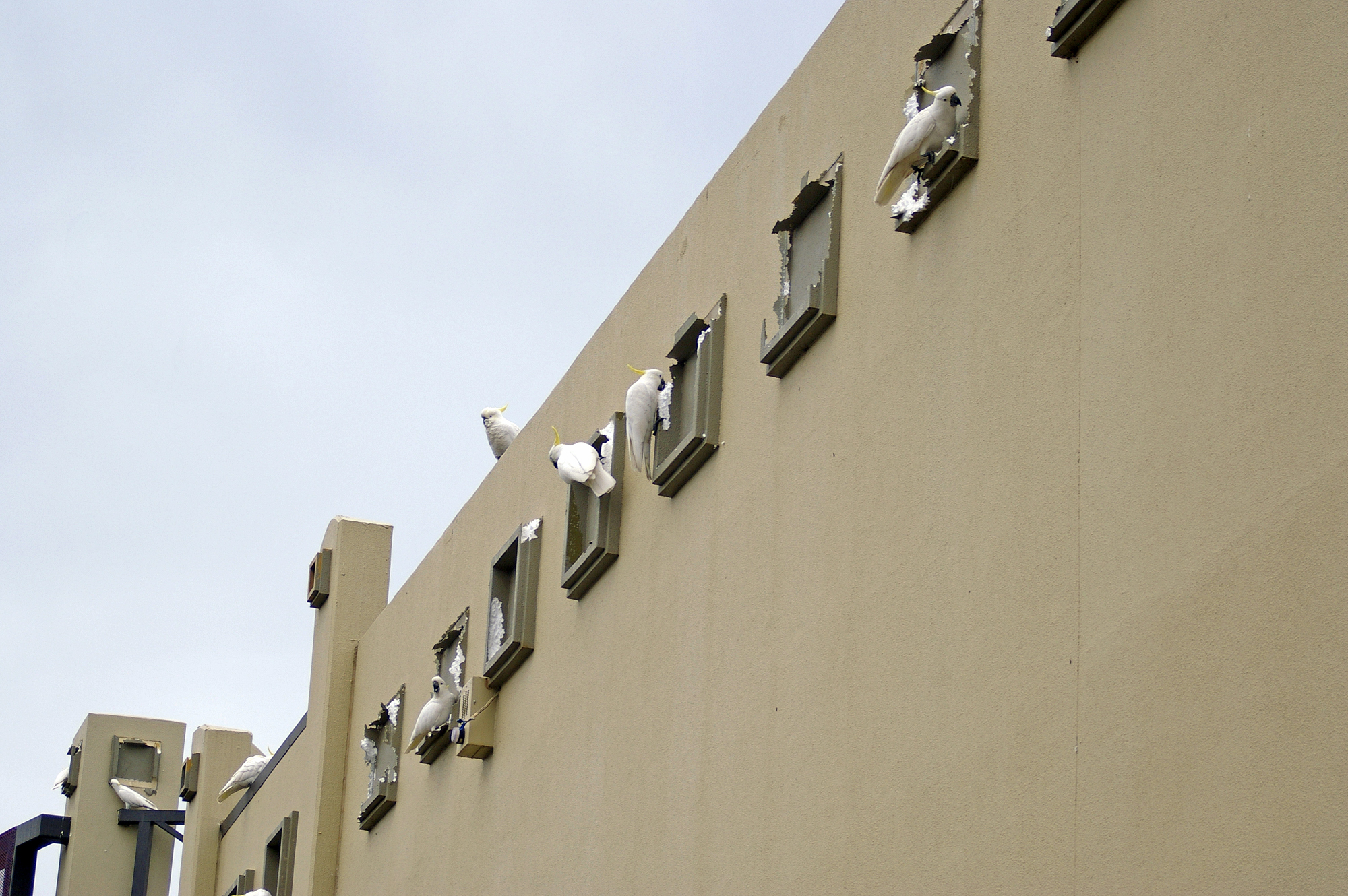
Numerous cockatoos causing damage to polystyrene facade on a shopping centre, New South Wales

In some parts of Australia, sulphur-crested cockatoos can be very numerous and may cause damage to cereal and fruit crops and newly planted tree seedlings, as well as soft timber on houses and outdoor furniture. Consequently, they are sometimes shot or poisoned as pests. A government permit is required for any culling, because the birds are a protected species under the Australian Commonwealth Law.

Many have assumed that the human feeding of sulphur-crested cockatoos has caused many issues for the birds, including pest behaviour and disease in many localities. Numerous places around Australia such as the Surf Coast in Victoria and the Blue Mountains in New South Wales have had residents complain and rules be constructed to forbid locals and visitors in towns and national parks from hand-feeding cockatoos.

== Aviculture ==
Sulphur-crested cockatoos may no longer be imported into the United States as a result of the Wild Bird Conservation Act. However, they have been bred in captivity, with Eleonora and Triton cockatoos the most common subspecies seen in aviculture in the USA and Europe. They are socially demanding pets and have a natural desire to chew wood and other hard and organic materials. They are also loud, often unleashing loud squawks or piercing screeches. They may also make aggressive, unpredictable movements, which can frighten people and animals unaware of the accompanying affection.

One cockatoo called Fred was still alive at 100 years of age in 2014. Cocky Bennett of Tom Ugly's Point in Sydney was a celebrated sulphur-crested cockatoo that reached an age of 100 years or more. He had lost his feathers and was naked for much of his life, and died in the early years of the 20th century. His body was stuffed and preserved after death. Another, born in 1921 and residing in Arncliffe with his owner Charlie Knighton, was 76 years old in the late 1990s. Their longevity can cause a problem of being a beloved pet and bonding to an adult who then, as they age together, dies while the bird is in its prime but has lost its life partner. The deceased owner's children are often faced with the problem of how to rehome the bird. RSPCA in Canberra regularly form large flocks of these birds, which are then rehabilitated to the wild as a family unit.

Sulphur-crested cockatoos, along with many other parrots, are susceptible to psittacine beak and feather disease, a viral disease, which causes birds to lose their feathers and grow grotesquely shaped beaks. The disease occurs naturally in the wild, and in captivity.
