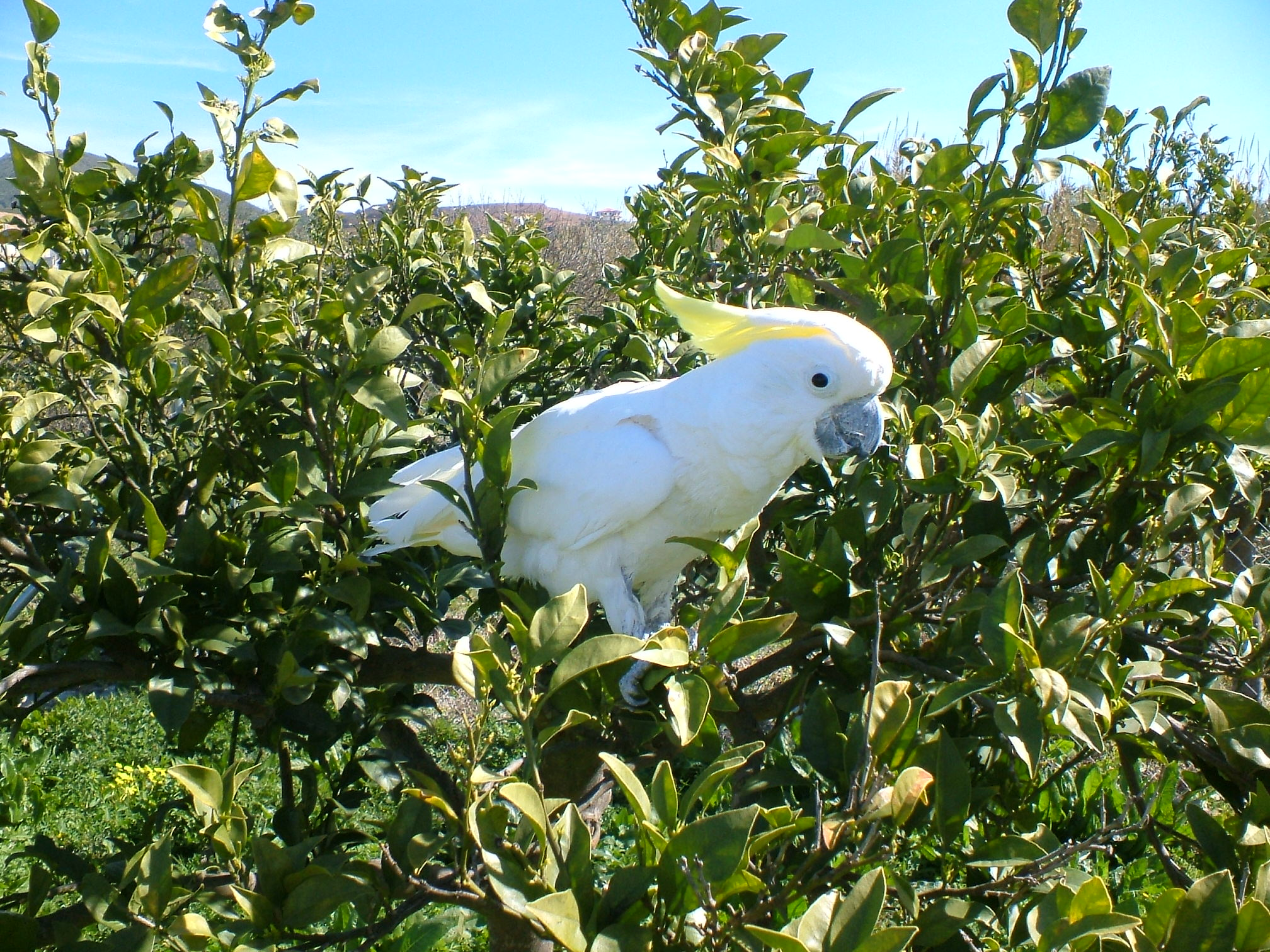

Conservation status
- Least Concern (IUCN 3.1)

Scientific classification
- Kingdom: Animalia
- Phylum: Chordata
- Class: Aves
- Order: Psittaciformes
- Family: Cacatuidae
- Genus: Cacatua
- Species: C. galerita
- Subspecies: C. g. eleonora

Trinomial name
- Cacatua galerita eleonora Finsch, 1863
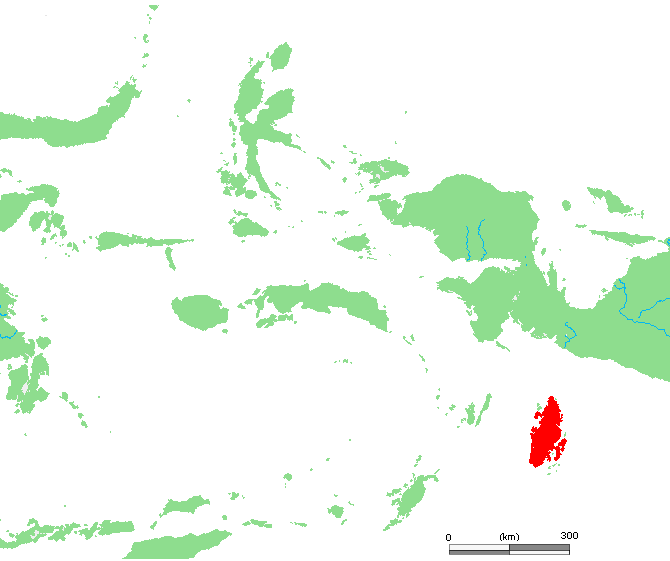
- Aru Islands (in red)

= Eleonora cockatoo =

Subspecies of bird

The Eleonora cockatoo (Cacatua galerita eleonora), also known as the medium sulphur-crested cockatoo, is a subspecies of the sulphur-crested cockatoo. It is native to the Aru Islands in the province of Maluku in eastern Indonesia, but has also been introduced to Kai Islands. Avicultural populations are well-established in Europe and the United States.

The Eleonora cockatoo was named by Otto Finsch. He discovered the subspecies in Amsterdam's Artis zoo and named it after Maria Eleonora van der Schroef, the wife of the then director of the zoo. This subspecies was accepted by Gerlof Mees in 1972 and Joseph Forshaw (1989) and recognised by Edward C. Dickinson and James Van Remsen Jr. (2013).

== Characteristics ==
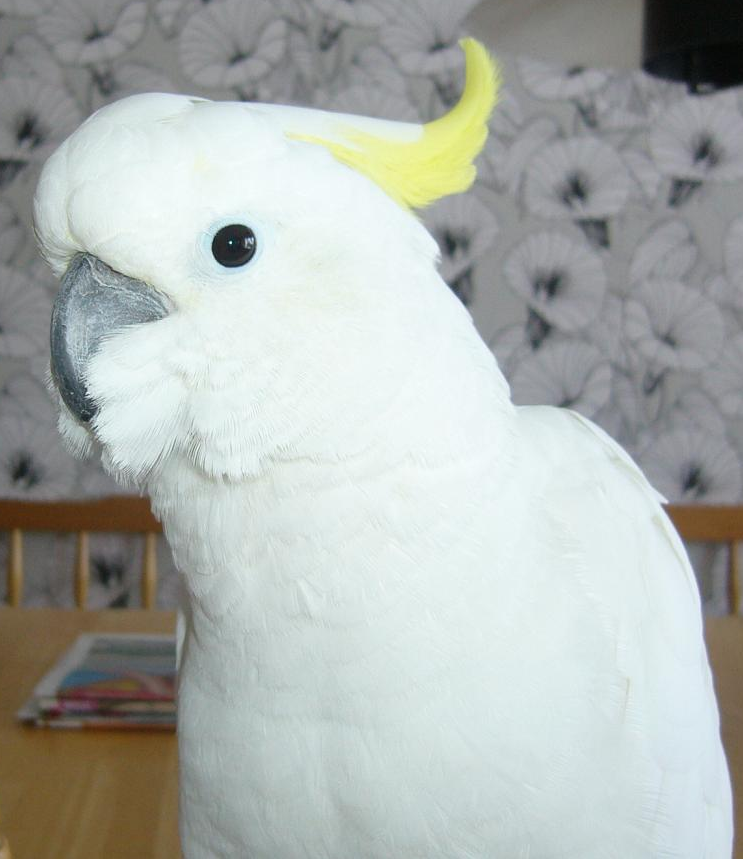
Head and upper body detail

It is the smallest of the four subspecies of Cacatua galerita, at approx. 44 cm (17 in) long and weighing between 404–602 g (14–21 oz). Apart from the size difference, the Eleonora differs from the greater sulphur crested in that it doesn't have as prominent white eyerings (they often are a pale blue), the crest of an Eleonora is often less curved and it doesn't have the pointy upper mandible, which is only found in Cacatua galerita galerita. Although a smaller and lighter bird, in practice it may be difficult to differentiate this subspecies from the Triton cockatoo.

The Eleonora cockatoo often has pale yellow ear patches, and yellow diffusion throughout the body, especially under the wings and tail. The Eleonora also has a bald patch under its crest.

== Diet and habitat ==
In the wild, the Eleonora cockatoo is found in open woodlands, forests, and semi-arid forested areas, as well as partially cleared forest areas. It feeds on nuts, berries, flower buds, flowers, seeds and insects.

== Reproduction ==
The breeding season of this cockatoo is mainly from September to January. The birds build their nests in a tree hollow or rock crevice. The female lays 2–3 white oval eggs, which hatch after a period of 30 days. Both parents incubate the eggs and in turn provide for the chicks. The young fledge after about 75 days.

== Intelligence and beat perception ==
One notable Eleonora cockatoo is Snowball, a bird recently demonstrated to be capable of beat induction – in other words, that the bird is capable of perceiving a musical beat and dancing to it.

Like all cockatoos, the Eleonora cockatoo is widely considered to be very intelligent and emotionally complex.
