= Conrad Vernon =

American film director and voice actor

- Born: July 11, 1968 (age 58); Lubbock, Texas, U.S.
- Occupations: Director; producer; writer; storyboard artist; voice actor
- Years active: 1991–present

Conrad Vernon (born July 11, 1968) is an American director, producer, writer, storyboard artist and voice actor, best known for his work as a writer and voice actor on the DreamWorks animated film series Shrek as well as other films such as Monsters vs. Aliens and Madagascar 3: Europe's Most Wanted. He also co-directed non-DreamWorks animated films such as Sony Pictures' Sausage Party and MGM's The Addams Family.

== Life and career ==
Conrad Vernon was born on July 11, 1968, a native of Lubbock, Texas, studied at CalArts and worked as a storyboard artist for animated productions (including Ralph Bakshi's Cool World); he also directed Morto the Magician (a four-minute animated film written by Steve Martin).

Vernon began his career in 1991. In 1996, he joined DreamWorks, where he worked as a storyboard artist on Antz. After Antz proved a success as the first animated feature film to be produced by DreamWorks Animation, Vernon signed on as a writer for Shrek, where he was responsible for the Gingerbread Man, and eventually voiced that character. He also appeared in Shrek 4-D and Sinbad: Legend of the Seven Seas.

In June 2004, he made his feature film directorial debut with the Academy Award-nominated Shrek 2 alongside Andrew Adamson and Kelly Asbury. He voiced Mason the chimpanzee for the DreamWorks Animation films Madagascar, Madagascar: Escape 2 Africa, Madagascar 3: Europe's Most Wanted (for which he is also credited as director) and its spin off Penguins of Madagascar (where he voiced Rico, one of the penguins) and reprised the voice of Mason in the television series.

In 2009, Vernon and Rob Letterman co-directed the 3D animated film Monsters vs. Aliens, which he co-wrote and supplied several voices.

Vernon and Greg Tiernan co-directed the adult animated comedy Sausage Party (2016), from a story by Seth Rogen, Evan Goldberg, and Jonah Hill, as well as providing some of the voices. Vernon next co-produced and co-directed, again with Tiernan, an animated version of The Addams Family, which was released in October 2019. He supplied voice roles for both Sausage Party and The Addams Family, including Lurch in the latter. He was scheduled to return as director alongside Tiernan for The Addams Family 2, released in October 2021. In October 2020, it was announced that he would no longer be involved as director, though he ultimately received co-billing with Tiernan.

In 2017, Vernon was hired to direct an animated feature adaptation of The Jetsons, from a screenplay by Matt Lieberman, which is being made by Warner Bros., under its Warner Animation Group banner.

== Filmography ==
=== Film ===
Year	Title	Director	Producer	Notes
2001	Morto the Magician	Yes	No	Short film
2004	Shrek 2	Yes	No	Co-director with Andrew Adamson and Kelly Asbury
2009	Monsters vs. Aliens	Yes	No	Co-director with Rob Letterman
2012	Madagascar 3: Europe's Most Wanted	Yes	No	Co-director with Eric Darnell and Tom McGrath
2016	Sausage Party	Yes	Yes	Co-director with Greg Tiernan
2019	The Addams Family	Yes	Yes	Co-director with Greg Tiernan
2021	The Addams Family 2	Yes	Yes	Co-director with Greg Tiernan
2027	Shrek 5	Yes	No	Co-director with Walt Dohrn

==== Acting roles ====
Year	Title	Role	Notes
1999	Herd	Pesion	Live-action role
2001	Shrek	Gingerbread Man	
2001	Shrek in the Swamp Karaoke Dance Party	Gingerbread Man	Short film
2003	Shrek 4-D	Gingerbread Man	
2003	Sinbad: Legend of the Seven Seas	Jed	
2004	Shrek 2	Gingerbread Man, Cedric, Announcer, Mongo, Muffin Man	
2004	Far Far Away Idol	Gingerbread Man	Short film
2005	Madagascar	Mason	
2005	The Barnyard (pitch)		
2006	Flushed Away	Take Out	
2007	Bee Movie	Freddy	
2008	Madagascar: Escape 2 Africa	Mason	
2009	Monsters vs. Aliens	Advisor Hawk, Advisor Dither, Minister, Secret Service Man #2, Mama Dietl	
2011	Kung Fu Panda 2	Boar	
2011	Puss in Boots	Raoul	
2012	Madagascar 3: Europe's Most Wanted	Mason	
2014	Penguins of Madagascar	Rico	
2016	Sausage Party	Toilet paper, Sauerkraut, Grape, Catcall sausage, Beer can, Pop bottle	
2017	The Boss Baby	Eugene Francis	
2017	The Emoji Movie	Trojan Horse	
2019	Trouble	Otis	
2019	The Addams Family	Lurch, Priest, Spirit of the House, Dr. Flambe, Ggerri	
2021	The Addams Family 2	Lurch, Spirit of the House	
2022	Puss in Boots: The Last Wish	Gingerbread Man	
2025	Smurfs	Butler	
2027	Shrek 5	Gingerbread Man	

==== Other credits ====
Year	Title	Role
1991	No Neck Joe	Special thanks
1992	Cool World	Character designer Effects animator
1998	Antz	Storyboard artist
2000	The Road to El Dorado	Additional storyboard artist
2001	Shrek	Additional dialogue/story artist/writer: "Merry Men"
2003	Sinbad: Legend of the Seven Seas	Additional storyboard artist
2004	Shark Tale	Additional storyboard artist
2004	Shrek 2	Additional dialogue
2005	Madagascar	Creative consultant
2005	The Madagascar Penguins in a Christmas Caper	Creative consultant; Short film
2006	Over the Hedge	Story artist
2009	Monsters vs. Aliens	Story writer
2016	Trolls	Additional story artist
2017	Captain Underpants: The First Epic Movie	Special thanks
2017	The Emoji Movie	Additional sequence director
2019	The Addams Family	Story writer

=== Television ===
Year	Title	Notes
1993	Rocko's Modern Life	Storyboard artist, additional writer
1993–1994	2 Stupid Dogs	Storyboard artist
1993–1996	The Itsy Bitsy Spider	Director
1996	Dexter's Laboratory	Storyboard artist, layout artist
1997	Nightmare Ned	Storyboard artist
2012–2014	The High Fructose Adventures of Annoying Orange	Executive producer, storyboard artist
2024–2026	Rock Paper Scissors	Executive producer
2024–2025	Sausage Party: Foodtopia	Director
2025–present	Wylde Pak	Executive producer

==== Acting roles ====
Year	Title	Role
2007	Shrek the Halls	Gingerbread Man
2009–2012	The Penguins of Madagascar	Mason
2009	Monsters vs. Aliens: Mutant Pumpkins from Outer Space	Man on Cell, Woman
2010	Scared Shrekless	Gingerbread Man, Muffin Man
2010	Kung Fu Panda Holiday Special	Boar
2012	The High Fructose Adventures of Annoying Orange	Various

=== Video games ===
==== Acting role ====
Year	Title	Role	Note
2005	Madagascar	Mason, Captain, Construction Worker #1, Tour Bus Driver	
2005	Shrek Super Slam	Gingerbread Man	
2007	Shrek the Third	Gingerbread Man, Evil Knight #1, Jock #1	
2007	Shrek: Ogres & Dronkeys	Gingerbread Man	
2007	Shrek n' Roll	Gingerbread Man, Evil Knight #1	
2008	Shrek's Carnival Craze	Gingerbread Man	
2008	Madagascar: Escape 2 Africa	Mason	
2009	Madagascar Kartz	Mason	
2010	Shrek Forever After	Gingerbread Man	
2012	Madagascar 3: The Video Game	Mason	
