= Mark Moseley (actor) =

American voice actor

- Occupations: Voice actor; radio personality; stand-up comedian; singer-songwriter
- Years active: 1986–present
- Children: 4 (including Amanda)

Mark Moseley is an American voice actor, radio personality, stand-up comedian, and singer-songwriter. He has appeared in a variety of films, television shows, and video games. He serves as a voice double for Eddie Murphy, Arnold Schwarzenegger, Patrick Warburton, and Robin Williams, and formerly served as a voice double for Patrick Stewart.

== Career ==
Mark Moseley has also played Mushu for Disney in everything except the original film Mulan, where Eddie Murphy played Mushu. This includes starring in the sequel, Mulan 2, the former Mulan parade, and a trove of theme park attractions, TV shows, and video games, for example, the Square Enix game Kingdom Hearts II. He also voiced several characters in Shrek 2 and sang in Murphy's place in the Shrek extra ending, Shrek in the Swamp Karaoke Dance Party and Donkey in the Shrek video games. Moseley has also sound-doubled Arnold Schwarzenegger, most notably in the video game Terminator 3: The Redemption, in which Moseley's voice is often heard "side-by-side" with Schwarzenegger's original recordings for the previous Terminator game. Moseley has appeared on numerous hit TV series - mostly in voice-over roles. These include The Fairly OddParents, The Sopranos, The PJ's, Jimmy Kimmel Live!, My Life as a Teenage Robot, Father of the Pride, House of Mouse, and others.

In God of War III, Moseley voiced the character King Minos. In Night at the Museum: Battle of the Smithsonian video game, Moseley played the role of Theodore Roosevelt, as portrayed in the movie by Robin Williams. For Star Wars: The Old Republic, he plays eight roles in the game.

In 2007, Moseley was chosen for the voice of President Schwarzenegger in The Simpsons Movie. The producers had toyed with the idea of having the Schwarzenegger voice sound realistic (Moseley is known for his authentic-sounding impression of Schwarzenegger), as opposed to a parody. In the end, they used the original cast member Harry Shearer, who performs the Schwarzenegger parody 'Ranier Wolfcastle' in the TV series, in the US theatrical and DVD version of the film, though English-speaking Simpson fans around the world can hear Moseley's version, as producers decided to use his portrayal of Schwarzenegger in the Simpson's International English version of the movie.

In 2015, Moseley was cast in the re-occurring role of Agamemnon, in DreamWorks Animation Television's series The Mr. Peabody & Sherman Show, a role originally played in the 2014 film Mr. Peabody & Sherman by Patrick Warburton.

Previously in his career, he was a morning personality for Miami's leading pop station, WPOW Power 96, from 1986 through 2002, and again from 2005 to 2007 (he performed remotely from his home in Los Angeles). While at WPOW in 1986, Moseley created the novelty hit song "Ronnie's Rapp", under the name "Ron And The DC Crew". Originally created as a comedy sketch for his morning show, the song was distributed by Profile Records, and became a club hit in 1986, reaching number 93 on the Billboard Hot 100.

In 2009, Moseley worked with his long-time idol Rick Dees, as a member of Dees' morning radio cast on Los Angeles' KHHT, as well as being a cast member and writer for his Rick Dees Weekly Top 40.

Beginning in January 1998, Moseley reunited with his own radio friend DJ Laz to be a part of Laz's morning radio show in LA on KXOL-FM, and in Miami on WRMA.

In 2014, Moseley joined DJ Skee in his new venture Dash Radio, the world's largest all original digital radio network. At Dash, Moseley is Director of Classic Programming, curating 17 of Dash Radio's music stations. He also provides the imaging voices for all of the stations he programs, as well as hosting and producing multiple shows on various Dash stations.

Moseley was also hired by DJ Skee to be the voice-over announcer for his music entertainment show SKEE TV, currently airing on the Fuse network.

== Personal life ==
Moseley has four children, two of them are also in the entertainment industry. His daughter, Amanda Moseley, (whose professional name is Mandy Rain), was a cast member of the Nickelodeon series Star Camp, produced by host Nick Cannon, Quincy Jones, and Quincy Jones III. She went on to be one of the stars of Nick Cannon's girl group School Gyrls, a '360' project that included two TV movies, music, and merchandising- including a tween-aimed book series. She is now a successful songwriter, solo music artist, social media influencer, and a radio host and programmer at Dash Radio. His son, Matthew Moseley, most notably has appeared in multiple episodes of the MTV series Punk'd, ABC's Dancing with the Stars, NBC's The Voice, and three times as a special guest on Fox's So You Think You Can Dance. Matthew Moseley hosts multiple talk shows, does a live DJ show, and programs an all-gaming-talk station on Dash Radio.

== Filmography ==
=== Film ===
Year	Title	Role	Notes
2001	Mickey's Magical Christmas: Snowed in at the House of Mouse	Mushu	Direct-to-video
2002	Help, I'm a Boy!	Hopp, Swim Announcer, Mr. Schneider, Pawn Shop Man	English dub
2004	Shrek 2	Mirror, Dresser	
2004	Mulan II	Mushu	Replacing Eddie Murphy as his Sound Double; Direct-to-video
2005	Pom Poko	Reporter, News Anchor	English dub
2006	Dr. Dolittle 3	Additional Voices	

=== Television ===
Year	Title	Role	Notes
1999–2001	The PJs	Thurgoode Orenthal Stubbs	27 episodes
2001–2003	House of Mouse	Mushu	9 episodes
2004	Father of the Pride	Jermece, Monkey, Alan the Duck	4 episodes
2006	My Life as a Teenage Robot	Delivery Guy, Skyway Patrol, Sergeant	
2007	Shrek the Halls	Donkey	Singing voice
2014	SKEE Live	Announcer	
2015, 2017	The Mr. Peabody & Sherman Show	Agememnon, Additional Voices	2 episodes
2016	Skee TV	Announcer	9 episodes
2017	The Fairly OddParents	Security Guard	

=== Video games ===
Year	Title	Role	Notes
1998	Disney's Animated Storybook: Mulan	Mushu	
1999	Disney's Arcade Frenzy	Mushu	
2002	Kingdom Hearts	Mushu	
2004	EverQuest II	Dwarven Prisoner, Quintius Calacius, Grommlyk Oognee	
2004	Shrek 2	Donkey	
2004	Terminator 3: The Redemption	The Terminator	
2005	Shrek Super Slam	Donkey	
2005	True Crime: New York City		
2006	Kingdom Hearts II	Mushu	
2006	Shrek Smash n' Crash Racing	Donkey	
2006	The Lord of the Rings: The Battle for Middle-earth II	Corsairs of Umbar, Dwarves, Wild Men of Dunland	
2006	The Lord of the Rings: The Battle for Middle-earth II: The Rise of the Witch-king	Corsairs of Umbar, Dwarves, Orcs	
2007	Shrek the Third	Donkey	
2007	The Golden Compass	Board Shopkeeper, Servants	
2008	Kingdom Hearts: Chain of Memories	Mushu	
2008	Shrek's Carnival Craze	Donkey	
2009	Night at the Museum: Battle of the Smithsonian	Theodore Roosevelt	
2010	God of War III	King Minos	
2010	Shrek Forever After	Donkey	
2011	DreamWorks Super Star Kartz	Donkey	
2011	Star Wars: The Old Republic	Additional Voices	

== Discography ==
Singles

Year	Title	US
1986	"Ronnie's Rapp"	93
1987	"Tyrone's Rap"	—
