= List of Shrek (franchise) video games =

There have been several licensed video games based on the Shrek franchise. They have been released on many different platforms, including PlayStation 2, Game Boy Advance, PlayStation Portable, Xbox 360, PlayStation 3, Wii, Microsoft Windows, and mobile devices.

== Games ==
=== Main series ===
Name	Date	Platforms	Additional detail
Shrek	2001	Xbox, GameCube	A launch title for the Xbox. Published by TDK Mediactive. Also noted for being one of the first commercial video games to make use of deferred shading.
Shrek 2	2004	GameCube, PlayStation 2, Xbox, Windows, Mac and J2ME	Published by Activision.
Shrek 2	2004	Game Boy Advance	Published by Activision.
Shrek the Third	2007	Xbox 360, Windows, Wii, PlayStation 2, PlayStation Portable, and J2ME	Published by Activision.
Shrek the Third	2007	Nintendo DS	Published by Activision.
Shrek the Third	2007	Game Boy Advance	The last DreamWorks Animation game to be released for the GBA.
Shrek Forever After	2010	Xbox 360, Windows, Wii, PlayStation 3, iOS and J2ME	Published by Activision.
Shrek Forever After	2010	Nintendo DS	Published by Activision.
Shrek 2 Remastered	2026	PlayStation 5, Xbox Series X and Series S, Nintendo Switch, Nintendo Switch 2 and Windows	Developed and published by Aspyr Media

=== Spin-offs ===
Not only have there been games based on the films, but there have also been spinoffs too. They include racing, party and fighting games, and many more.

==== Racing ====
Name	Date	Platforms	Additional detail
Shrek Swamp Kart Speedway	2002	Game Boy Advance	Published by TDK Mediactive.
Shrek Smash n' Crash Racing	2006	GameCube, PlayStation 2, and PlayStation Portable,	Published by Activision. The last Shrek game on GameCube.
Shrek Smash n' Crash Racing	2006	Nintendo DS and Game Boy Advance	Published by Activision.
Shrek Kart	2009	iOS, Android, Palm Pre	Published by Gameloft. Closed and removed from stores in 2017.
DreamWorks Super Star Kartz	2011	Xbox 360, Wii, PlayStation 3, Nintendo DS, Nintendo 3DS	The last DreamWorks Animation game to be published by Activision.
DreamWorks All-Star Kart Racing	2023	PlayStation 5, Xbox Series X and Series S, Nintendo Switch, PlayStation 4, Xbox One, and Windows PC	Published by GameMill Entertainment

==== Party ====
Name	Date	Platforms	Additional detail
Shrek: Treasure Hunt	2002	PlayStation	Published by TDK Mediactive. It is also the only Shrek game on the PlayStation.
Shrek Super Party	2002	Xbox, GameCube, and PlayStation 2	Published by TDK Mediactive.
Shrek's Carnival Craze	2008	PlayStation 2, Windows, and Wii	Published by Activision.
Shrek's Carnival Craze	2008	Nintendo DS	Published by Activision.
Shrek Party	2008	J2ME	Published by Gameloft.

==== Other ====
Name	Date	Platforms	Additional notes
Shrek: The Electronic Storybook Collection	2001	Windows	Published by ipicturebooks. Received a 2 out of 5 rating from AllGame.
Shrek: Fairy Tale Freakdown	2001	Game Boy Color	Published by TDK Mediactive. Received a 0.5 rating from Game Informer.
Shrek Game Land Activity Center	2001	Windows	Published by Activision Value and TDK Mediactive. Received a 4 out of 5 rating from AllGame.
Shrek: Hassle at the Castle	2002	Game Boy Advance	Published by TDK Mediactive.
Shrek Extra Large	2002	GameCube	Port of the original Xbox game. Published by TDK Mediactive. A PlayStation 2 version was planned, but was cancelled due to TDK Mediactive's acquisition by Take-Two Interactive.
Shrek: Swamp Fun with Phonics	2002	Windows	
Shrek: Swamp Fun with Early Math	2002	Windows	
Shrek: Reekin' Havoc	2003	Game Boy Advance	The last Shrek game to be published by TDK Mediactive.
Shrek 2 Activity Center: Twisted Fairy Tale Fun	2004	Windows	
Shrek 2: Ogre Bowler	2004	Windows	Published by WildTangent Games.
Shrek 2: Team Action	2004	Windows	Port of the Shrek 2 game that is based on the console versions.
Shrek 2: Beg for Mercy	2004	Game Boy Advance	
Shrek 2: Trivia	2004	J2ME	Quiz-game. Published by DTR and Eurofun.
Shrek 2: Castle Run	2004	J2ME	
Shrek SuperSlam	2005	PlayStation 2, Xbox, GameCube, and Windows	Published by Activision.
Shrek SuperSlam	2005	Nintendo DS	Published by Activision.
Shrek SuperSlam	2005	Game Boy Advance	Published by Activision.
Shrek: Fiona's Rescue	2005	Sky Gamestar	Published by Denki. Ceased in 2015.
Shrek: Disarming Charming	2005	Sky Gamestar	Published by Denki. Ceased in 2015.
Shrek: Fairy Godmother's Revenge	2005	Sky Gamestar	Published by Denki. Ceased in 2015.
Shrek 2: The Adventure of Puss in Boots	2005	J2ME	Published by Eurofun.
Shrek: Double Trouble	2006	Sky Gamestar	Published by Denki. Ceased in 2015.
Shrek: Imperial Peril	2006	Sky Gamestar	Published by Denki. Ceased in 2015.
Shrek Jumble Rumble	2007	Sky Gamestar	Published by Denki. Ceased in 2015.
Shrek n' Roll	2007	Xbox Live Arcade	First Shrek game to be download only.
Shrek the Third	2007	Sky Gamestar	Published by Denki. Ceased in 2015.
Shrek: Ogres & Dronkeys	2007	Nintendo DS	Published by Activision.
Shrek Forever After	2010	Sky Gamestar	Ceased in 2015.
Puss in Boots	2011	Xbox 360, Wii, PlayStation 3	The last DreamWorks Animation game published by THQ.
Puss in Boots	2011	Nintendo DS	The last DreamWorks Animation game published by THQ.
Fruit Ninja: Puss in Boots	2011	iOS, Android	
Shrek's Fairytale Kingdom	2012	iOS	Produced by Beeline Interactive
Shrek Alarm	2013	iOS	The last DreamWorks Animation game to be released by Blitz Games Studios
Pocket Shrek	2015	iOS, Android	Published by No Yetis Allowed. Removed from stores 6 April 2018.
Shrek Sugar Fever	2017	iOS, Android	
Funko Pop! Blitz	2020	iOS, Android	Published by East Side Games.
PowerWash Simulator	2022	Nintendo Switch, PlayStation 5, and Xbox One	Published by FuturLab
Shrek Swamp Tycoon	2024	Roblox supported platforms	Officially released July 17, 2024.

=== Educational ===
There are quite a few educational Shrek games that exist for the V.Smile and V.Flash. They are aimed towards toddlers and young children. They include:

Name	Date	Platform	Age range
Shrek: Dragon's Tale	2006	V.Smile	(United States) 6-8 (France) 6-9 (Netherlands) 6-9
Shrek Forever After	2010	V.Smile	(United States) 4-6 (Spain) 4-7 (France) 4-7
Shrek the Third: Arthur's School Day Adventure	2007	V.Smile	(United States) 4-6 (Spain) 5-8 (France) 4-6
Shrek the Third: The Search for Arthur	2007	V.Flash	(United States) 6-8 (United Kingdom) 7-9 (Spain) 6-9 (France) 6-9 (Germany) 6-8

== Critical reception ==
=== Overview ===
- The Game Boy Advance version of Shrek 2 received an IGN rating of 7.9, the highest of all the Shrek video games, while the PS2 version of the game received a score of 7.0.
- The PlayStation 2 version of Shrek: Super Party received the lowest IGN rating of all the Shrek video games with a score of 2.9. Shrek Extra Large was also received poorly, with a score of 3.0.
- Shrek: Fairy Tale Freakdown received an abysmal score of 0.5/10 from Game Informer.

=== Ratings ===
Name	IGN	GameSpot
Shrek	5.6	5.3
Shrek Extra Large	3	6.9
Shrek Super Party	3.0 (Xbox version), 3.8 (GameCube version), 2.9 (PS2 version)	Unrated
Shrek 2	7.9 (GBA version), 3.9 (Windows version), 7.0 (All other versions)	4.5 (Windows version), 6.8 (All other versions)
Shrek SuperSlam	4.5 (DS version), 7.0 (All other versions)	6.9
Shrek Smash n' Crash Racing	4.0 (DS version), 5.0 (GBA version), 5.9 (All other versions)	Rated Z
Shrek the Third	7.0 (DS version), 6.0 (All other versions)	5.2
Shrek's Carnival Craze	3.3 (DS version)	Rated E

== See also ==
- Shrek
