= Shrek 5 =

Upcoming DreamWorks Animation film

- Teaser poster with former release date
- Directed by: Walt Dohrn; Conrad Vernon
- Written by: Michael McCullers
- Based on: Shrek! by William Steig
- Produced by: Chris Meledandri; Gina Shay
- Starring: Mike Myers; Eddie Murphy; Cameron Diaz; Zendaya
- Music by: John Powell
- Production company: DreamWorks Animation
- Distributed by: Universal Pictures
- Release date: June 30, 2027
- Country: United States
- Language: English

Shrek 5 is an upcoming American animated fantasy comedy film loosely based on the 1990 children's picture book Shrek! by William Steig. Directed by Walt Dohrn and Conrad Vernon, and written by Michael McCullers, it is the sequel to Shrek Forever After (2010), the fifth main installment in the Shrek franchise, and the seventh overall. Mike Myers, Eddie Murphy, and Cameron Diaz will reprise their respective voice roles as the title character, Donkey, and Princess Fiona from the previous films, with Zendaya, Skyler Gisondo, and Marcello Hernández joining the cast.

A fifth Shrek film was initially planned and announced after the release of Shrek 2 (2004) with a 2013 release date in mind. However, when then-DreamWorks Animation CEO Jeffrey Katzenberg decided to end the franchise with the fourth film, plans for a fifth installment were abandoned and Shrek Forever After was released as the last Shrek film. In June 2016, Universal Pictures announced intentions to develop a fifth Shrek film when its parent company, NBCUniversal, bought DreamWorks Animation, with updates following from September 2016 to August 2026.

Shrek 5 is scheduled to be theatrically released in the United States on June 30, 2027, by Universal Pictures.

== Premise ==
The film follows Shrek, Donkey, and Princess Fiona on an adventure in a city called "Further Further Away", alongside Shrek and Fiona's three children.

== Voice cast ==
- Mike Myers as Shrek
- Eddie Murphy as Donkey
- Cameron Diaz as Princess Fiona
- Zendaya as Felicia
- Skyler Gisondo as Farkle
- Marcello Hernández as Fergus
- Conrad Vernon as The Gingerbread Man

== Production ==
=== Background ===
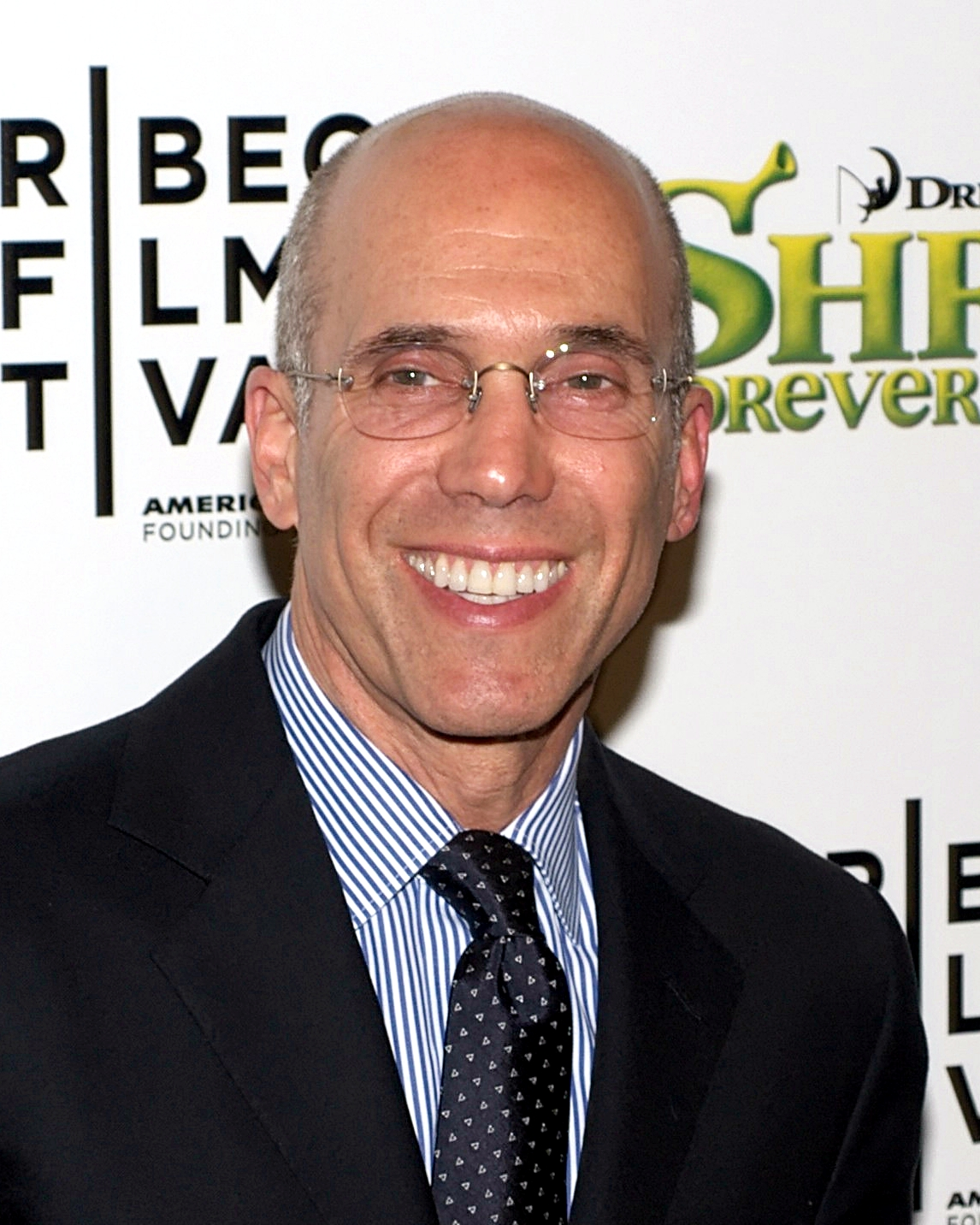
DreamWorks Animation founder, Jeffrey Katzenberg, at the world premiere for Shrek Forever After (2010).

After the success of Shrek 2 in May 2004, co-founder of DreamWorks Animation (DWA) and then-CEO Jeffrey Katzenberg planned a five-film story arc that began with Shrek (2001) and would conclude with a fifth installment. After the release of Shrek the Third (2007), Katzenberg then-announced that the fifth film would be released in 2013.

In May 2009, DreamWorks announced that the fourth film's title would be Shrek Forever After (2010), originally titled Shrek Goes Fourth, indicating that it would be the last in the Shrek series. Later in 2009, that was confirmed by Bill Damaschke, the former head of creative production at DWA, with him saying: "All that was loved about Shrek in the first film is brought to the final film". Josh Klausner, one of the writers of Shrek Forever After, explained in 2010 the script's evolution: "When I first came onto the project, it wasn't supposed to be the final chapter — there were originally going to be five Shrek movies. Then, about a year into the development, Katzenberg decided that "the story that we'd come up with was the right way for Shrek's journey to end, which was incredibly flattering".

In February 2014, during an interview with Fox Business, Katzenberg hinted that a fifth film might still be made: "We like to let them have a little bit of time to rest", he said of the characters. "But I think you can be confident that we'll have another chapter in the Shrek series. We're not finished, and more importantly, neither is he".

=== Development ===
In June 2016, two months before Comcast-owned NBCUniversal finished its purchase of DreamWorks Animation for $3.8 billion, and the same month the United States Department of Justice (DOJ) approved the acquisition, NBCUniversal chief Steve Burke discussed plans to revive the Shrek franchise, as well as other DreamWorks films. In September 2016, Eddie Murphy (voice of Donkey) announced that the script for the fifth Shrek film had been completed. The original story for the film was written by DreamWorks' The Boss Baby (2017) writer Michael McCullers, based on his own idea. When asked about the script in March 2017, McCullers said it featured "a pretty big reinvention" for the film series.

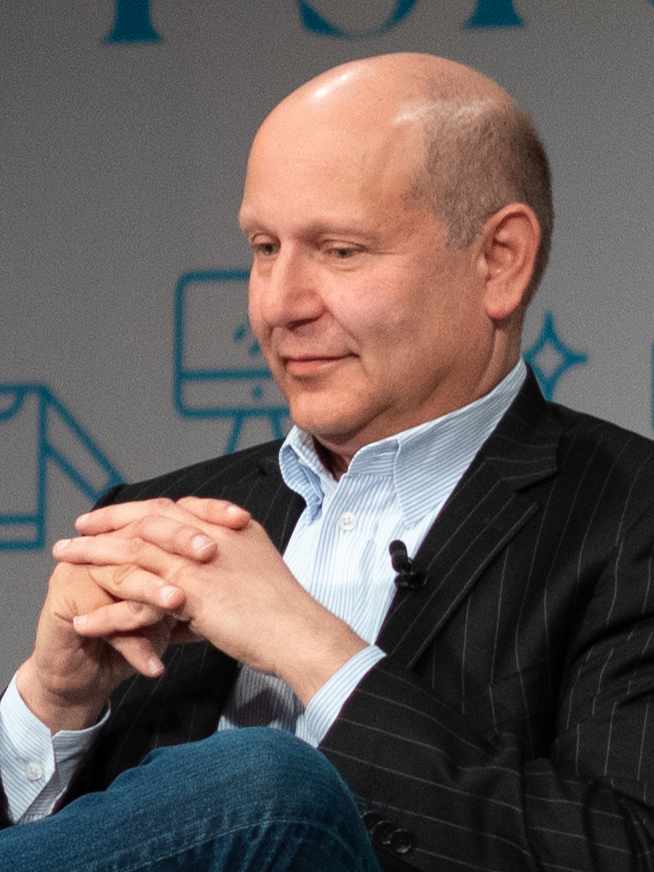
Illumination CEO, Chris Meledandri, was tasked to be an executive producer for Shrek 5 in 2018.

In November 2018, it was reported by Variety that Illumination CEO Chris Meledandri had been tasked to be one of the executive producers of both the untitled Shrek film and the spin-off film Puss in Boots: The Last Wish (2022), with the original cast potentially returning. In December 2022, Antonio Banderas (voice of Puss in Boots) reiterated that a new Shrek film was still in development. The film was teased in the mid-credits scene of The Last Wish with Puss returning to Far Far Away, along with Kitty Softpaws and Perrito. In April 2023, Meledandri confirmed a fifth Shrek film was in development, with the original cast—Murphy, Mike Myers (voice of Shrek), and Cameron Diaz (voice of Princess Fiona)—in negotiations to reprise their roles. Meledandri said the filmmakers would "look at what the core elements are that audiences have loved" and try to "honor those elements" in a similar vein to Illumination's The Super Mario Bros. Movie.

In June 2024, while promoting his film Beverly Hills Cop: Axel F, Murphy revealed that he had started recording his lines as Donkey a couple of months earlier. The following month, DreamWorks confirmed that Myers, Murphy, and Diaz would reprise their roles in the film, tentatively titled Shrek 5. Walt Dohrn, who previously served as a story artist on Shrek 2 and Shrek the Third, as well as the head of story and voice of Rumpelstiltskin in Shrek Forever After, was also attached to direct, with Brad Ableson co-directing and Gina Shay co-producing with Meledandri. In January 2025, it was announced that Conrad Vernon, who previously co-directed Shrek 2 and voiced the Gingerbread Man in the previous films, also returned to direct the film alongside Dohrn. In late February 2025, it was revealed that Zendaya had joined the cast, as Shrek and Fiona's daughter Felicia. By July 2025, voice recording was still underway according to Murphy. In November 2025, during the Macy's Thanksgiving Day Parade, it was announced that Skyler Gisondo and Marcello Hernández had joined the cast as Shrek and Fiona's two sons Farkle and Fergus, respectively. In August 2026, it was announced that voice acting had been completed, with the film mixing "edgy humor mixed with the heart" like the previous films.

=== Music ===
In June 2026, it was announced that John Powell, who previously co-scored the first Shrek film with Harry Gregson-Williams, would compose the score for Shrek 5. In an interview, Gregson-Williams was supportive of Powell carrying the torch he carried in the following films, saying it was "absolutely right and proper that he would be doing it". He continued by saying, "I have no hard feelings about that. I had my amazing decade with Shrek, and I'll be first in line to see what John does with it."; Powell commented on the score for Shrek 5 wanting to sound "new and interesting, but warm and familiar as well."

== Marketing ==
The first-look cast announcement trailer was released on February 27, 2025, which introduced a new visual style and updated character appearances, sparking debate. Viewers drew parallels to the backlash against the title character's initial 2019 redesign of Sonic the Hedgehog (2020), with some criticizing the new look for losing Shrek's original appeal and art style, while others were more positive partially due to the technological advancements since the last main installment. On June 16, 2026, the first official teaser trailer was released.

=== Merchandise ===
On May 12, 2025, Universal Products & Experiences appointed Just Play as the master global toy licensee for the Shrek franchise, including said film.

== Release ==
Shrek 5 is scheduled to be released in the United States on June 30, 2027. Originally set for release on July 1, 2026, it was pushed back to December 23, 2026, with Illumination's Minions & Monsters taking over the original release date, before it was set to its current release date. The film will be released 17 years after the release of Shrek Forever After.

As part of Universal's long-term deal with Netflix for its animated films, the film is contracted to stream in the United States on Peacock for the first four months of its pay-TV window, then move to Netflix for the next ten months, and then return to Peacock for four months.

== Future ==
A spin-off prequel, titled Donkey, is set for June 30, 2028, with Charlie Bean directing and Eddie Murphy reprising his role as the titular character. Additionally, in May 2026, Dana Carvey stated that Mike Myers directly told him "We're doing two more [Shrek films]."
