= Puss in Boots (Shrek) =

Fictional character in the Shrek franchise

- Shrek character
- First appearance: Shrek 2 (2004)
- Based on: "Puss in Boots" by; Giovanni Francesco Straparola; Giambattista Basile; Charles Perrault; James Bond by Ian Fleming; Indiana Jones by George Lucas; Zorro by; John Eskow; Ted Elliott; Terry Rossio
- Adapted by: Andrew Adamson
- Voiced by: Antonio Banderas (2004–present); André Sogliuzzo (2004–present, video games and DreamWorksTV); Eric Bauza (2015–2026)

In-universe information
- Aliases: Diablo Gato; The Furry Lover; Chupacabra; Frisky Two Times; The Ginger Hit Man; The Stabby Tabby; El Macho Gato; The Leche Whisperer; Pickles
- Species: Tabby cat
- Gender: Male
- Weapon: Rapier
- Family: Unknown biological parents Imelda (adoptive mother); Humpty Dumpty (adoptive brother)
- Significant others: Kitty Softpaws (in the Puss in Boots films); Dulcinea (in The Adventures of Puss in Boots)
- Origin: San Ricardo
- Nationality: Spanish/American

Puss in Boots (or simply Puss) is a main fictional character in the Shrek franchise. He made his first appearance in the film Shrek 2 (2004). He is also the title character and protagonist in the 2011 spin-off film Puss in Boots (in which his origins are described) and its 2022 sequel, Puss in Boots: The Last Wish (set sometime after Shrek Forever After). Puss also appears in the non-canon Netflix television series centered on him, The Adventures of Puss in Boots (2015–2018).

Puss was loosely based on the title character of the fairy tale "Puss in Boots". His design, created by Tom Hester, was based on real cats. Several characters were used as inspirations for Puss's characterization, such as Zorro, James Bond, and Indiana Jones. The idea of Puss as the protagonist of a film was explored after his debut appearance. Antonio Banderas voices Puss in the English, Spanish, and Italian dubs of the Shrek franchise. While he initially tried a high-pitched voice for the character, he and the Shrek 2 filmmakers decided on a tone that was deeper than his normal voice. Banderas said that voicing Puss was an important part of his career. Eric Bauza is the voice of Puss in Boots in the non-canon spin-off, The Adventures of Puss in Boots.

The DreamWorks character of Puss in Boots has received generally positive reviews, with critics praising his depiction and considering him a source of comic relief. Reviewers have regarded Puss as a popular Shrek character. Banderas's voice acting has also been praised. Merchandise inspired by the character has been produced.

== Development ==
=== Concept and creation ===
Puss in Boots is loosely based on the title character of the fairy tale with the same name. Character designer Tom Hester provided Puss's design, which was based on cats owned by Shrek director Andrew Adamson and effects supervisor Ken Bielenberg. After Antonio Banderas had been cast as Puss's voice, the Shrek animators analyzed his performance as the title character in The Mask of Zorro (1998) for insight into Puss's depiction. Inspired by Banderas's Zorro, the filmmakers decided to make Puss's origins Spanish (instead of the fairy tale's Italian and French). When computer-animating Puss, new animation tools were required for his fur, belt, and the plume on his hat.

Chris Miller, head of story of the film Shrek 2 (2004), said that he enjoyed the character of Puss as much as viewers seemed to; he and everyone else involved in Shrek 2 wanted to add more scenes related to Puss to the film. Miller described Puss as "a really cool, dynamic sidekick character at that time", saying that the filmmakers had decided to link the character to a "weird history" in which he had been "everywhere" and done "everything". He and the other filmmakers wondered what the story of Puss would look like and why he had his accent. According to Miller, writing and developing Puss had been "so much fun", and the character had a "huge impact" in Shrek 2 by stealing so many scenes. Miller said that he had "always loved" the character and had been "fascinated by where Puss had been before". Puss repeatedly mentions "some great adventure" (without details) in the Shrek films, and Miller wanted to know more about his origins (such as where his boots came from). Miller called Puss his favorite Shrek character, who had "always stood out", and could not imagine anyone other than Banderas voicing him; soon after the character had been created, Banderas was offered the role. Miller commented that the actor's performance was "pretty brilliant".

After realizing at the 2004 Cannes Film Festival how much viewers enjoyed Puss's character, Jeffrey Katzenberg, co-founder of DreamWorks Animation, began considering "the idea of possibly continuing with the character in the Shrek series" and creating a film with Puss as the protagonist. Katzenberg called Puss a "scene stealer" and said he "seemed to beg for his own film" after his first appearance in the Shrek franchise. Miller knew that Puss was suitable for a standalone film, and he was pleased when Banderas quickly accepted the role. Miller was happy with DreamWorks's decision to create a film about Puss and excited to contribute to its production. He said the idea of Puss having his own film had been considered since the character had joined the Shrek franchise, attributing this to "the size and scope of that character" and "the personality that Antonio infused that character with". Although the filmmakers initially wanted to bring cats to the DreamWorks studios to study them for the development of Puss, the DreamWorks staff suggested watching YouTube cat videos instead. According to Miller, YouTube was the filmmakers' "great resource" of inspiration to which they added their "personal experience". He said that cats, "as seriously as they take themselves", "can never resist their true nature", and he cited Puss's "hissing" as an example.

The Puss in Boots filmmakers knew from the beginning that something about the character "demanded [the story] just be larger than life". While the story had initially been conceptualized as "loosely based" on the classic fairy tale, involving "Puss and three sons of the miller", the filmmakers decided to create "a new story told on a grander scale", "something that would be more worthy of" Puss. "Spaghetti Western style and structure" also inspired Puss's character, and the filmmakers decided to use "big screen legends" as inspiration. Miller cited Clint Eastwood as one of the "classic cinematic figures" inspiring Puss's portrayal and regarded him as "a strong force" since there was "something about Clint that was in the cat". He also cited Indiana Jones's "adventurous spirit", James Bond and Errol Flynn. Miller also cited Zorro as an inspiration for Puss since Banderas (who played Zorro) voiced him, and he said that "Antonio's persona [had] really dictated so many of the choices that [had been] made" about Puss's character in Puss in Boots. According to Miller, it is "very difficult to tell the difference" between Puss and Banderas.

The filmmakers decided to give Puss "a heavy story" in Puss in Boots; they felt that breaking his heart would be "really important", and they wanted to offer him "something to redeem himself from and clear his name". They debated whether Puss would be portrayed as a misunderstood fugitive. Miller said that although Puss could have been depicted as deceptive, the filmmakers had decided to portray him as blameworthy; robbing the bank was not Puss's plan and he ran away "out of fear", but he had to take responsibility for his actions. Miller stated that Puss's "desire to believe the best in someone else" and to "hang on to a friendship" represent "the kind of things that get him in trouble". Puss's backstory was meant to indicate the "heaviness on his mind and in his heart", and why he was on the run despite his "cool life". Miller said that Puss was a "pretty wide open" character when it came to his portrayal in the film; Puss adds a dramatic note to everything, which the filmmakers used "to attach a very tragic story to his life". Miller stated that "the heavy dramatic themes" fit Puss's character well, making the character's journey a "story of redemption" in which "he sort of walks a dark path with a hole punched in his heart" and wishes "to clear away the sins of his past" and "reclaim what was his". Miller said that Puss in his cape affirmed "an urban legend"; although he wore it in marketing material, he rarely did so in the films. According to Miller, Puss's cape was "so expensive to keep strapped to that cat" and "so cumbersome" that the Puss in Boots filmmakers decided to have the character wear it for a short time, as in Shrek 2. Miller felt that Puss's "giant big eyes" would appeal to viewers. Puss in Boots executive producer Guillermo del Toro said that Puss would be taken "to a completely different land which is very exotic" in the then future adventure film Puss in Boots: The Last Wish since Miller wanted the film to be set in a visually different universe than Shrek's.

Doug Langdale, executive producer of the television series The Adventures of Puss in Boots (2015–2018), said that in the series Puss fights "a lot more" compared to the films; he is depicted "more as a master swordsman with lots of extra punching, kicking and action". Langdale stated that he "wanted to set the show earlier in Puss's life, back when he was the only one who thought he was a legend ... had more to prove, and maybe [was not] quite so awesome at everything yet", which determined that the series would be set before the film Puss in Boots. He said that since Puss is a "hero", the series focuses on his saving people and defeating "bad guys". Langdale added that in the series, "unexpected depth and nuance" are brought to the character with comedy; Puss was a "nomad" and a "loner" before the events of the series, which "is an essential segment in Puss's life" that taught him "how to get along with other people" and made him "understand the value of friendships and relationships". According to Langdale, "the audience [would] willingly follow" Puss's "charm, charisma and appeal".

=== Voice ===
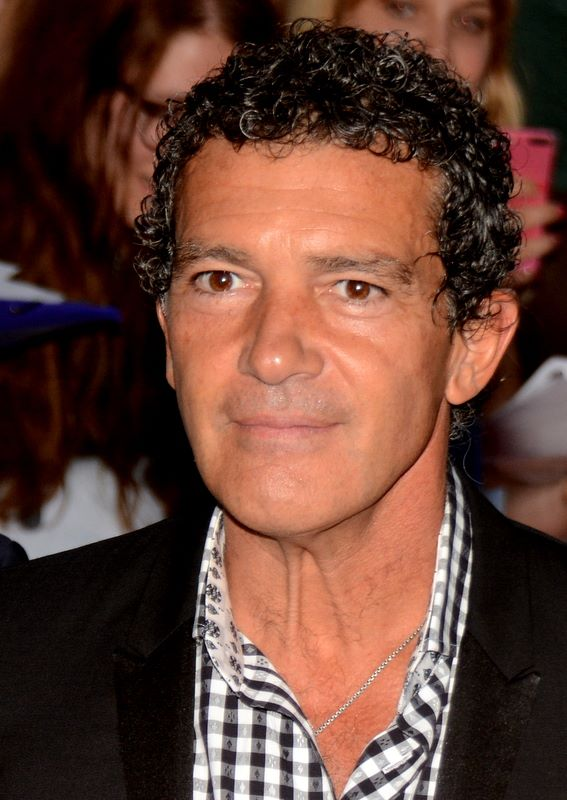
Antonio Banderas (pictured above) also voiced Puss in Boots in the Spanish and Italian dubs of the Shrek franchise.

Robert Patrick, Harrison Ford, Sylvester Stallone, David Krumholtz, Dennis Quaid, and Todd Stashwick were considered for the role of Puss before Antonio Banderas was cast. Antonio Banderas voiced Puss in the Shrek franchise. Banderas said that his initial motivation to voice Puss was that he enjoyed the first Shrek film. According to the actor, he was chosen for the role of Puss because of his Spanish accent. According to Banderas, he was on Broadway for the musical Nine when Jeffrey Katzenberg approached him about taking the role. The Shrek 2 filmmakers showed him "a lot of paintings of the character", and he realized how "little" Puss was. Banderas said that he had developed a strategy for playing Puss after accepting the role, which had determined Puss's personality. Although he could have used a high-pitched voice for Puss, which was the filmmakers' original idea, he and the others working on the film opted for a tone that was "deeper" and "more breathy" than his normal voice. Banderas called the choice "very interesting", adding that it "helped to establish the limits and the parameters of the character in terms of personality". He regarded the effect as "almost like a lion trapped in the body of a little cat", which makes Puss "different". According to the actor, Puss's voice contrasts with his body; he stated that "the cat is not supposed to talk like that", adding that the difference between Puss's voice and appearance is comic relief. He also commented that the contrast between Puss's appearance and voice makes it seem like he is not even aware of his size. Banderas said that after the decision about Puss's voice had been made, the filmmakers had begun depicting the character "in a totally different way". He added that Puss had initially been conceptualized as "quite a little character" but had started gaining more importance after the filmmakers had realized his potential. Banderas said that he and the filmmakers had "a lot of fun" with Puss's character, and he felt that viewers did too.

Banderas said that the first scene he had recorded was coughing up a hairball, adding that he had spent "45 minutes doing strange sounds"; although it left him voiceless, he saw the moment as "fun". When asked about the most difficult part of voicing Puss, Banderas said "the biggest challenge was to understand the animation process". The actor said that in addition to providing Puss's English voice, he voiced the character in Spanish and Italian, calling the Italian dub "the most challenging" since he had to follow "the character's face movement"; In the Spanish dubs, Puss speaks with a distinct Andalusian Spanish accent, including the use of ceceo (the "Castilian lisp"), reflective of Banderas' origins. When he was at the Cannes Film Festival for Shrek 2, Banderas noticed that Puss's character received much public attention. About Puss's changed appearance in Shrek Forever After (2010), Banderas joked that the character's weight gain did not bother him but the pink ribbon (which Puss wears in the film) did. For Puss in Boots, Banderas advised the filmmakers to depict the relation between Puss and Kitty Softpaws (voiced by Salma Hayek) as a "love-hate" relationship to generate "a great lot of comedy"; Hayek stated that Banderas is completely believable as Puss since both are "very self-confident", characterizing him as perfect for this role. Banderas said that he wanted Puss to keep "his mischievousness and edginess" in this film since viewers enjoyed "the edgy side" of the character.

Asked about similarities between him and Puss, Banderas said that Puss had values which he lacked; the character was "too courageous". He said that the filmmakers had wanted to incorporate some of his "personal features" into Puss's character, with characters he had played in other films, such as Zorro and the characters he had portrayed in Desperado (1995) and The 13th Warrior (1999), serving as inspirations. Banderas said that he saw "a little bit more" of himself as the films in which Puss appears were released, describing Puss as his "alter ego". He is proud that his character is Latino since it is "good for diversity and cultural interaction", saying children would see that "heroes actually have a strong accent" in Puss in Boots.

Banderas said that he loved Puss's character. Asked about which one of Puss's characteristics he preferred, the actor cited his mischievousness; according to Banderas, Puss does amazing things in the three Shrek films in which he appears. Playing Puss meant "a lot" for his career; although he had not been able to speak English when he had come to America, the filmmakers wanted his voice for the films. Banderas said he had not initially known how difficult voicing a character was, stating that "you have to get into the character" to do it well. The Shrek franchise was important to him, representing "the magnificent part of Hollywood and the search for perfection"; Banderas viewed being a part of the Shrek production as "very beautiful". He was recognized in public for his role as Puss.

Banderas reprised his role as Puss in Boots for the 2022 film Puss in Boots: The Last Wish.

Eric Bauza voiced Puss in the Netflix series The Adventures of Puss in Boots. Bauza said that he had auditioned "fair and square" for Puss's role (despite having worked with executive producer Doug Langdale on another show) and had enjoyed working with the production team. He said he had been asked to do a motion capture as Puss before the start of the series, adding that "to embody that character, physically, was so tough". Bauza called the sounds he needed to provide for Puss "iconic" since he is "such a well-known character". According to Bauza, voicing Puss was a "challenge because Puss speaks in such a whisper". Bauza said that he had "watched a lot of Antonio's films", had imagined how he would have performed on certain occasions, and had tried to be as "unpredictable"; he stated that his voice is similar to Banderas's. Since he voiced the central character in the series, Bauza had "the luck and luxury to be able to record with a majority of the people that are in the show". He felt that "having the responsibility of taking over a role such as Puss in Boots is quite the honor". Bauza thought that a series centered on Puss was clever, keeping the audience interested until the release of Puss in Boots: The Last Wish, and said it would present "some sides to Puss that you [cannot] really get out of the feature films or even shorts".

André Sogliuzzo voiced Puss in several Shrek video games. Sogliuzzo voiced Puss for 36 episodes, and Christian Lanz voiced Puss for 8 episodes of Puss In Boots Shorts (AKA NEW Puss in Boots on YouTube Peacock Kids) which is a 3-year series of vlog-type one-minute spots wherein Puss gives advice to his fans. Christian Lanz won the 2016 Winner Voice Arts Award for Outstanding TV Animation, Best Voiceover for "Epic Cat Battles with Puss in Boots." The meowing sounds Puss makes in the films were provided by Frank Welker.

=== Characterization ===
Miller characterized Puss as "a fiercely loyal and honorable cat". He further referred to Puss as "a pint-sized, pocket-sized, fun character". Miller also described Puss as "really appealing" and also as "a normally proportioned cat dressed up, but bold, animated, and romantic". He viewed Puss as "colorful" as well. Miller stated that "Antonio's persona and this explosive, dynamic, huge figure that was really cute" completely fit Puss's portrayal in Puss in Boots. He also said Puss is an "amplified version of Antonio coming out of this tiny little furry package" and that this makes him an "instantly funny", "intriguing", and "complex character". He added that Puss "is very melodramatic", seeing this as "funny" because of how Puss's character is depicted and believing Banderas was "really good" at portraying this side of the character. He further said Puss "is at his funniest when he takes himself too seriously", which always happens since he "sees himself as a very important figure". Miller stated that while Puss has a "really big heart", he still is somewhat mischievous. Miller characterized Puss as someone who had seen "the light really early in life" and who is "affecting change on everyone around him". He further described him as "half lover, half fighter" and as "a bit roguish and a bit of a troublemaker". Miller also characterized Puss as "unpredictable".

Langdale said that Puss is a "character anyone can relate to", which makes him "great". He said that "on the surface, Puss is the coolest guy in the world", "great at everything", "saves and protects people", and "seems like he can defeat anyone", despite "this wonderful vulnerability" due to him being "tiny". According to Langdale, Puss is "just a regular-sized cat in a people-sized world" with an "elephant-sized" personality.

Banderas described Puss as "a little bit mysterious", with "a sweetness"; he added that the character "knows how to make people jealous" and "can be manipulative with just his eyes". According to Banderas, viewers could identify with Puss's attempts to obtain something. Banderas said that Puss is a "womanizer" who courts "the lady cats", and enjoys having a female "in front of him that can fight as hard as him". He stated that Puss is "so little", and the actor enjoyed his "contrast in size" with Shrek.

== Appearances ==
=== Shrek 2 ===
Puss makes his first appearance as a supporting character in the film Shrek 2, where he is initially hired by King Harold (Shrek's father-in-law) to kill Shrek. He meets Shrek and his companion, Donkey, and unsuccessfully attacks Shrek. Puss tells Shrek the reason for his attack and begs for mercy. Because Shrek refuses to harm him, Puss offers to join him and becomes his partner. During the course of the film, Puss helps Shrek to obtain a potion that turns Shrek and his wife, Princess Fiona, into humans, attacks a group of guards to buy Shrek time to save Fiona, and befriends Shrek and Donkey (although he starts a rivalry with the latter). At the end of the film, Puss sings a duet with Donkey, performing "Livin' la Vida Loca".

=== Shrek the Third ===
In the film Shrek the Third (2007), Puss travels with Shrek and Donkey to bring Fiona's cousin, Arthur Pendragon, to the Far Far Away Kingdom so he can become the new king (instead of Shrek). During their journey, Puss gives Shrek advice. In a later teleportation spell, Puss has his body switched with Donkey's. After initial difficulty getting used to their new bodies, Puss and Donkey join forces in the battle against Prince Charming to save Shrek, and they convince Arthur that he is meant to be king. Puss and Donkey regain their own bodies and, in an end-of-film ellipsis, Puss and other characters care for Shrek and Fiona's children.

=== Shrek Forever After ===
Puss is present in the film Shrek Forever After, at the beginning of which he attends the first birthday party of Shrek and Fiona's children. In the alternate universe created by the film's antagonist, Rumpelstiltskin, and entered by Shrek, Puss has gained weight and is Fiona's pet after his retirement. Realizing that Shrek has feelings for Fiona and knows about her curse, Puss befriends Shrek. When Shrek, Fiona, and the other ogres in this universe are captured, Puss and Donkey save Shrek and Fiona; Puss is a key participant in the later battle against Rumpelstiltskin and his allies. Shrek returns to his real universe, where Puss as his usual self enjoys the birthday party with the other characters.

=== Puss in Boots ===
The film Puss in Boots is a spin-off from, and prequel to, the Shrek films. After he was abandoned as a kitten, Puss finds shelter at an orphanage in the Spanish town of San Ricardo and is adopted by Imelda, the caretaker of the orphanage. He becomes friends with Humpty Alexander Dumpty, another resident of the orphanage who gives him the name "Puss" and with whom he decides to find the magic beans that would bring them to the Golden Goose. Puss performs a heroic act, for which he receives acclaim and his boots. His bond with Humpty begins to fray, and Humpty compels Puss to unknowingly rob the town's bank. This causes Puss to become a wanted fugitive and leave San Ricardo; years later, he learns who owns the magic beans and plans to steal them. He meets a cat who also wants to steal them: Kitty Softpaws, Humpty's partner. Humpty asks Puss to join them in their search for the beans, and Puss eventually accepts. They find the beans, plant them, and a beanstalk brings them to a castle in the sky. They find the Golden Goose and return with it to the ground. Puss returns to San Ricardo, where he realizes that Humpty has been plotting against him. Puss is arrested, and he learns that the Golden Goose's mother will come and try to retrieve it. With Kitty's help, Puss escapes, confronts Humpty who unleashes his wounded pride to Puss, and they reconcile. Humpty sacrifices himself to allow Puss to save the Golden Goose and return it to its mother (preventing the town's destruction), and Puss and Kitty escape the town guards.

=== Puss in Boots: The Last Wish ===
Puss is once again the title character and protagonist in Puss in Boots: The Last Wish, a sequel to the 2011 film Puss in Boots; in the sequel, having used eight of his nine lives, Puss begins a journey to find the fabled Wishing Star and use it to restore his lost lives.

== The Adventures of Puss in Boots ==
Puss is the protagonist of the non-canon Netflix series The Adventures of Puss in Boots, protecting the Spanish town of San Lorenzo after accidentally breaking the spell that was supposed to defend it; he is also present in Puss in Book: Trapped in an Epic Tale (2017), a television special included in the series.

=== Other appearances ===
Puss is present in the short film Far Far Away Idol (2004), singing a part of the song "These Boots Are Made for Walking"; he also appears in his own music video of this song. Puss is present in the television special Shrek the Halls (2007), going with other characters to Shrek's home to celebrate Christmas and telling a Christmas story. He also appears in the television special Scared Shrekless (2010), participating in a storytelling contest to frighten Shrek on Halloween; Puss tells a story with Donkey, but they cannot agree on a version. Puss appears in the short film Donkey's Caroling Christmas-tacular (2010), singing his version of the song "Feliz Navidad". Puss is also present in the short film Thriller Night (2011), in which a zombie version of him is shown. He also appears in the short film Puss in Boots: The Three Diablos (2012), training three kittens and leading them to the right path. Puss is featured in the 2023 short film Puss in Boots: The Trident as well. He is present in DreamWorksTV's vlog-style short webisodes. He has appeared on Jeopardy!, being the first computer-animated character to provide an entire category in the show. Puss can be seen in a commercial parodying an Old Spice advertisement.

Puss is a playable character in several Shrek video games, such as Shrek 2, Shrek the Third, Shrek Forever After, Puss in Boots, Shrek SuperSlam, Shrek Smash n' Crash Racing, Shrek n' Roll, Shrek 2: Beg for Mercy, Shrek's Carnival Craze Party Games, and Shrek Kart. He also appears in the video games Shrek: Dragon's Tale, Shrek the Third: Arthur's School Day Adventure, and Shrek the Third: The Search for Arthur. A tie-in video game for the character's 2011 film, Fruit Ninja: Puss in Boots, has been released as well. He also appears as a playable character in DreamWorks All-Star Kart Racing video game.

Puss makes a cameo appearance in Shrek The Musical, during the "Travel Song" scene. He has appeared in different stage shows, including one at the Duluth Depot, and another at the Universal Studios Singapore theme park. Puss has two theme park rides based on his franchise, the Puss in Boots' Giant Journey roller coaster at Universal Studios Singapore, and the Puss in Boots Sword Swing at Australia's Dreamworld theme park. Puss has appeared in meet-and-greet locations across several Universal theme parks around the world. Universal Kids Resort includes a themed land based on the Puss in Boots franchise.

== Reception ==
=== Critical response ===
Critical reception of Puss has been generally positive, with reviewers praising his portrayal in the films and describing him as "cute", "suave", "lovable", "charismatic", "feisty", "engaging", "legendary", "an instant charmer", "a natural-born star", "a notorious adventurer", the "suavest of swashbuckling cats", and "the world's greatest feline swordfighter". He was also regarded as "smooth-talking", "heroic", "honorable", self-confident, "passionate", loyal, with "humble" origins. Collider's Christina Radish said that Puss getting his own film was not surprising, commenting that the character is "charming and unforgettable" and deeming him "a cat destined for great things" with a "tremendous heart"; she also regarded Puss as a "much-loved fighter". Fantasy Magazine's Andrew Penn Romine called Puss "equal parts rogue and hero", but Stephen Holden of The New York Times described the character as "this vain, spoiled, swashbuckler". According to Holden, Puss is not "as clear-cut a personality [in Puss in Boots] as he was" in the Shrek films. IndieLondon's Rob Carnevale called him a "cheeky feline swashbuckler" and Puss in Boots's "enigmatic central character". Todd McCarthy of The Hollywood Reporter described Puss as a "dashing little kitty centerstage", "ever-bold", and "a self-deprecating, sometimes bumbling but ultimately dashing swordsman". McCarthy enjoyed Puss's "vigorous physicality" in Puss in Boots. Neil Genzlinger of The New York Times called Puss "endearing", "dashing and fearless but also a tad reckless". Chrissy Iley of The Telegraph described him as "the world's most seductive animated cat". IGN's Andy Patrizio enjoyed Puss in Shrek 2, and Scott Collura of the same website said that Puss "remains dignified and cool" in Shrek Forever After despite his weight gain. The character has been regarded as a source of comic relief.

Critics have stated that Puss is similar to Zorro, and he was called "a glorious reimagining of the swashbuckling charm of Zorro". Reviewers have also said that Puss resembles Captain Jack Sparrow from the film series Pirates of the Caribbean, because of him being a "swashbuckling", "charismatic scene-stealer". Puss has also been commented to share similarities with the characters Don Juan, Pepé Le Pew, and Tarzan.

The character's design has been discussed and praised, with Jesse Hassenger of PopMatters calling Puss a "spry, well-dressed" cat. Comic Book Resources writer Rob Levin described him as "a legend in his own right", with an "upright strut and leather boots". Christy Lemire of Boston.com said that Puss "looks so soft and fluffy and tactile in his little, leather boots, his ... feathered hat and his shiny sword"; she described him as "a tabby cat decked out in tiny Zorro duds". Todd McCarthy called Puss "a short orange critter with green eyes, feathered hat and large boots", and A. O. Scott of The New York Times praised his "convincingly animated fur". Puss's hat has been described as "jaunty", and as a "d'Artagnan hat". Graham Young of the Birmingham Post stated that Puss in Boots was "one of the most entertaining animations" he had ever seen, citing Puss's "wondrous", "little teeth" as a contributing factor to this. The character has been regarded as "tiny", with a Spin South West writer calling him "small in stature, but huge in personality".

Puss in Boots's ability to widen his eyeballs to trick his enemies into taking pity on him (pictured above) has been praised by critics.

Puss's ability to trick his opponents with his eyes has also been praised, with NJ.com writer Mark Voger describing it as Puss's "sympathy-winning big-eyes technique". Katharine M. Rogers wrote in her book titled Cat that while Puss is "an ostentatiously fierce swashbuckler", he is also able to "instantly melt any opponent by gazing at him", using his "steady, confiding gaze"; she thought that Puss's eyes "seem to consist entirely of warmly dark, liquid pupils". James Mottram of The National viewed the way Puss was "widening his eyes and mewing" as his "main weapon", referring to it as "a comic gem that, wisely, the filmmakers only resort to once" (in Puss in Boots) and feeling this is a detail that makes the film a delight. Ben Sherlock of Screen Rant regarded Puss as "popular" and said that "his technique of looking adorable with gigantic eyes to get his opponents to drop their guard before launching an attack on them" never fails. Jesse Hassenger described Puss as a "swashbuckling cat with the trappings of an actual feline, like purring and looking adorable to disarm enemies". Hassenger called Puss's eyes "big", "cute", and "not always easy to resist" (despite their purpose being "visible"). Graham Young described Puss's eyes as "emerald mince pies". Empire's Dan Jolin called the character's "dilated-pupils" a "cute act", and another Empire writer also praised Puss's ability to widen his eyes. Nev Pierce of the BBC described his eyes as "cutesy" and "saucer-like". IGN writer Jeff Otto wrote that Puss "can give the most adorable wide-eyed look" to "lure" his enemies into "his vicious swashbuckling attacks". Christy Lemire praised that Puss is "working those big, green eyes for maximum manipulative effect". Puss's "big eyes" were also described as a running gag.

Reviewers have provided comments regarding the character's popularity. Steven Lebowitz of AXS said that Puss was "just as popular as Shrek", and Joseph Airdo of the same website called him "arguably the most popular" character in the Shrek franchise. Ashley Rodriguez of Quartz also described Puss as a "popular Shrek character". Tech Times writer Robin Parrish called Puss "everyone's favorite Shrek sidekick". Christina Radish characterized Puss as an "adorable little creature" who had become "a fan favorite in the Shrek films", and Quickflix's Simon Miraudo called him one of the franchise's "signature characters". Rob Carnevale stated that Puss was "the real star of the franchise" to many Shrek fans. Andrew Penn Romine said that he is "one of the most popular characters in recent animation history". Marc Savlov of The Austin Chronicle felt that Puss was "the freshest and sharpest ... surprise" of Shrek 2; he was described as this "film's most delightful new character", "the most hilarious new character", the "most memorable character", "the most fantastic addition of all", "the franchise's greatest character", and "the best character of all". Stephen Holden wrote that although Puss "has his charms", "he is not as memorable a character as Shrek or Shrek's mouthy sidekick, Donkey", and Matt Fowler of IGN described him as "perhaps better suited as a side character". Puss was ranked 11th on Empire's top 50 animated film characters list.

Critics have praised Banderas's voicing. Rob Levin said that Puss has "a decidedly Latin flavor" in the Shrek films because of Banderas, who "plays the part with gusto, giving the tiny hero all the bravado and charm of his real-life persona". According to Andrew Penn Romine, Banderas voiced Puss "with feline gravitas". Rob Carnevale called Banderas's performance "inimitable". IAmRogue's Dana Gardner wrote that Banderas "brought plenty of comedy to the role of Puss by playing the character so melodramatically". Matt Fowler found Banderas "perfectly suitable as Puss", and Todd McCarthy called his performance "spirited and knowing". James Mottram praised "Banderas's charm" as well. Graham Young felt that Banderas's performance improved Shrek 2, resembling his acting in The Mask of Zorro, and Chrissy Iley described Puss as "a feline spoof of [Banderas's] Zorro character". Donna Bowater of The Telegraph called Banderas's performance "famous". Jeff Otto said that Banderas "lends a fantastic energy to the character", making viewers "wish for more of him". Alan Jones of Radio Times also enjoyed Banderas's voice acting. According to an Empire reviewer, Puss was "voiced to perfection by Banderas". In the book titled Stars in World Cinema: Screen Icons and Star Systems Across Cultures, the authors wrote that the "European roots" of the fairy tale "Puss in Boots" were "revived through the presence of Banderas". They stated that while Banderas's "on-screen persona" had been based on "his sensuality and body image", he then exchanged this representation for the image of "an animated ginger cat". The writers also commented that Puss's voice "was intended to speak to the audience's [internalized] views regarding accent and regional profile"; they said it was "vital" for Puss "not to belong to the dominant cultural group" despite being "adopted into that group". In his book titled The Animated Movie Guide, author Jerry Beck wrote that Banderas voiced Puss with "a Castilian accent" in the Latin American version and with "an Andalusian accent" in the Spanish version; he mentioned that both accents sounded "funny" to their respective target audiences. Entertainment Weekly's Maureen Lee Lenker said that Puss had become a "fan favorite" after his first appearance in the Shrek franchise, mostly because of Banderas's "smooth Spanish accent"; the "tie-in" with Banderas was stated to "largely" contribute to Puss's popularity. The Hollywood Reporter's Frank Scheck wrote that Banderas's "silky-voiced turn, conveying all of the character's over-the-top feline suavity while making it clear that [he is] very much in on the joke", is "what really makes [Puss in Boots: The Last Wish] work", adding that Banderas "is worth every penny".

=== Merchandise ===
Merchandise based on the character has been released, including plush toys. The company Funko has launched vinyl figures depicting Puss. McDonald's toys inspired by Puss have also been produced. Pez candy dispensers based on Puss have been created as well. Backpacks that portray Puss on their print have been released, and articles of clothing inspired by him have also been produced. A Monopoly game based on Puss and other Shrek characters has been invented.
