= Puss in Boots: The Last Wish =

2022 DreamWorks Animation film

- Theatrical release poster
- Directed by: Joel Crawford
- Screenplay by: Paul Fisher; Tommy Swerdlow
- Story by: Tommy Swerdlow; Tom Wheeler
- Produced by: Mark Swift
- Starring: Antonio Banderas; Salma Hayek; Harvey Guillén; Florence Pugh; Olivia Colman; Ray Winstone; Samson Kayo; John Mulaney; Wagner Moura; Da'Vine Joy Randolph; Anthony Mendez
- Cinematography: Chris Stover
- Edited by: James Ryan
- Music by: Heitor Pereira
- Production company: DreamWorks Animation
- Distributed by: Universal Pictures
- Release dates: November 25, 2022 (Lincoln Center); December 21, 2022 (United States)
- Running time: 102 minutes
- Country: United States
- Language: English
- Budget: $90–110 million
- Box office: $484.3 million

Puss in Boots: The Last Wish is a 2022 American animated adventure comedy film directed by Joel Crawford and written by Paul Fisher and Tommy Swerdlow. Produced by DreamWorks Animation, it is the sequel to Puss in Boots (2011) and the sixth installment in the Shrek film series. As with its predecessor, the film is based on the character introduced in Shrek 2 (2004) and inspired by the fairy tale. Antonio Banderas and Salma Hayek reprise their respective roles as the titular character and Kitty Softpaws, with Harvey Guillén, Florence Pugh, Olivia Colman, Ray Winstone, Samson Kayo, John Mulaney, Wagner Moura, Da'Vine Joy Randolph, and Anthony Mendez joining the cast. Set after the events of Shrek Forever After (2010), the story follows Puss in Boots, who teams up with Kitty Softpaws and a dog named Perrito to find the Last Wish of the fallen Wishing Star to restore eight of his nine lives. They race against other fairy tale characters seeking the same treasure, while a sinister wolf hunts Puss himself.

Following the success of Puss in Boots, planning for a sequel began in November 2012, but languished in development hell until it was revived in November 2018. In February 2019, it was announced that the film would be helmed by Bob Persichetti, head of story of the first film and co-director of Spider-Man: Into the Spider-Verse (2018). By March 2021, Crawford had replaced Persichetti as director. The story draws inspiration from Spaghetti Western films, with The Good, the Bad and the Ugly (1966) cited as a particular influence. The film's style was inspired by Spider-Man: Into the Spider-Verse. With new technologies, the team was able to give the film a painterly style to resemble a fairy-tale story, diverging from the visual style of previous installments in the Shrek franchise.

Puss in Boots: The Last Wish premiered at Lincoln Center in New York City on November 25, 2022, and was theatrically released in the United States on December 21 by Universal Pictures. It received acclaim from critics and was a commercial success, grossing $484 million on a production budget of $90–110 million, becoming the tenth-highest-grossing film of 2022. It was nominated for Best Animated Feature at the Academy Awards, the Golden Globes, the Critics' Choice Awards, and the British Academy Film Awards.

== Plot ==
Many years after his adventures with Shrek, (Note: As depicted in Shrek 2 (2004), Shrek the Third (2007), and Shrek Forever After (2010)) Puss in Boots is accidentally crushed by a church bell after subduing a giant during a party in the town of Del Mar. As he recovers, the town doctor advises him to retire because he has already lost eight of his nine lives. Puss initially refuses but relents when he is wounded and disarmed while dueling a wolf bounty hunter at the local pub. A traumatized Puss decides to follow the doctor's advice and move into elderly cat lady Mama Luna's home to live as a house cat.

Months later, Puss meets an optimistic chihuahua disguised as a cat, whom he calls Perrito. Crime family Goldilocks and the Three Bears soon arrive at Mama Luna's home, intending to hire Puss to help them steal a map displaying the location of the Wishing Star. They leave after finding his apparent grave, and Puss decides to find the Star to wish for another nine lives.

Puss, joined by Perrito, starts his quest by heading to the factory lair of the corrupt pastry chef and magical artifact collector "Big" Jack Horner, who intends to use the Star to control all of the world's magic. While stealing the map, Puss encounters his resentful ex-fiancée Kitty Softpaws, (Note: As depicted in Puss in Boots (2011)) who also wants the map. Goldi, the Bears, and Horner discover and chase down the trio, and Puss briefly sees the wolf in the distance. They all end up in the Dark Forest, a pocket dimension that manifests illusions of travelers' memories. During the subsequent clash, Puss suffers a panic attack and flees after the wolf reappears, allowing Goldi to take the map from Kitty.

After Perrito finds Puss and calms him down, Puss confesses his fears and remorse for abandoning Kitty before their wedding. She overhears and tells him that she did not attend the wedding either, believing that he loved himself too much to love her. Reinvigorated, Puss and Kitty retrieve the map while Goldi and the Bears are distracted by a manifestation of their woodland cottage. While escaping from Goldi and the Bears, Puss discovers the cave of lost souls, where reflections of his past lives ridicule him for changing his outlook. The wolf arrives and reveals himself to be Death, who, insulted by Puss' failure to value any of his lives, intends to take his final life personally. Horrified, Puss flees the cave, leaving Kitty and Perrito behind.

During an argument with Baby Bear, Goldi reveals that she intends to wish for a human family, feeling that she does not belong with her adoptive bear family. Though hurt by her confession, the Bears still agree to help her. Puss arrives at the Star and begins to make his wish, but a heartbroken Kitty arrives, berating Puss for his selfishness and revealing that she would have wished for someone she could trust. When Puss confesses his turmoil over his mortality, Kitty is understanding but remains frustrated with his carelessness. Goldi, the Bears, and Horner arrive, and a fight ensues for the map. Goldi briefly obtains it but abandons it to save Baby Bear, while Kitty traps Horner inside his magical bottomless bag.

Death arrives and challenges Puss to a duel, and Puss, having learned the value of a single life from his time with his companions, forgoes wishing for more lives and accepts Death's challenge. They duel and Puss temporarily disarms Death, declaring that, while he can never truly defeat Death, he will never stop fighting for his last life. Realizing that Puss is no longer arrogant, Death begrudgingly spares him and leaves, though they both acknowledge that they will eventually meet again. Puss reconciles with Kitty and selflessly allows her to make her wish, but she declines it, now able to trust him again.

Horner escapes the bag by eating a magic snack that transforms him into a giant. Perrito distracts him, allowing Puss, Kitty, and Goldi to destroy the map, which causes the Wishing Star to consume Horner and explode. During the aftermath, Goldi affirms to the Bears that they are her true family, deciding to take over Horner's business; Puss and Kitty rekindle their relationship, adopt Perrito, and steal the governor's ship to head to the kingdom of Far Far Away.

== Voice cast ==
- Antonio Banderas as Puss in Boots, a swashbuckling anthropomorphic tabby cat fugitive from the law and a hero of San Ricardo who has lost eight of his nine lives. In Mama Luna's Cat Rescue, Mama Luna named him "Pickles".
- Salma Hayek Pinault as Kitty Softpaws, an anthropomorphic street-savvy tuxedo cat and Puss' ex-fiancée who seeks the Wishing Star to find somebody she can trust.
- Harvey Guillén as Perrito, a friendly and naïve anthropomorphic Chihuahua who is initially disguised as one of Mama Luna's pet cats and wants to become a therapy dog, serving as the film's comic relief character.
- Florence Pugh as Goldilocks, known as Goldi, the adopted member and leader of the Three Bears Crime Family.
  - Kailey Crawford as Young Goldilocks
- Ray Winstone as Papa Bear, an anthropomorphic grizzly bear who is Mama Bear's husband, Baby Bear's father, and Goldilocks' adoptive father.
- Olivia Colman as Mama Bear, Papa Bear's wife, Baby Bear's mother, and Goldilocks' adoptive mother.
- Samson Kayo as Baby Bear, Papa Bear and Mama Bear's son, and Goldilocks' adoptive brother.
- John Mulaney as "Big" Jack Horner, a feared pastry chef who plans to use the Wishing Star to gain control of all magic. He has collected various magical items, creatures and people ever since being denied fairy-tale fame by being known as "Little" Jack Horner as a child. His group of henchmen cooks is called "the Baker's Dozen". An unapologetically insane and psychopathic killer, he is an egomaniacal and megalomaniacal man who regularly kills his own men to further his goals.
- Wagner Moura as the Wolf (Note: In promotional material, the character was referred to as "[the] Big Bad Wolf", though he is not credited as such in the film, and is separate from the character of the same name from the previous films in the main Shrek franchise.) / Death, a white wolf who is initially presumed to be a bounty hunter before revealing his true identity as Death himself to Puss, whom he wants to personally kill as punishment for Puss wasting eight of his nine lives. He wields twin sickles that combine into a double-bladed glaive.
- Da'Vine Joy Randolph as Mama Luna, an elderly cat lady who initially takes Puss in.
- Anthony Mendez as the doctor who tells Puss to retire after informing him of his eight deaths.
- Kevin McCann as the Ethical Bug, a parody of the Talking Cricket, who attempts to act as Jack Horner's "conscience" As the film progresses, he loses his faith in Horner, eventually deeming him as "horrible" and an "irredeemable monster". McCann's performance was strongly influenced by Jimmy Stewart's voice and speech patterns.
- Bernardo De Paula as the Governor of Del Mar
- Betsy Sodaro and Artemis Pebdani as Jo and Jan Serpent, twin criminal sisters who deliver the map of the Wishing Star to Horner.

Additionally, Conrad Vernon and Cody Cameron reprise their roles as Gingy and Pinocchio from previous Shrek films in cameos during flashbacks. Shrek, Donkey, and Imelda from Puss in Boots (2011), meanwhile, make non-speaking appearances in flashbacks.

== Production ==
=== Development ===
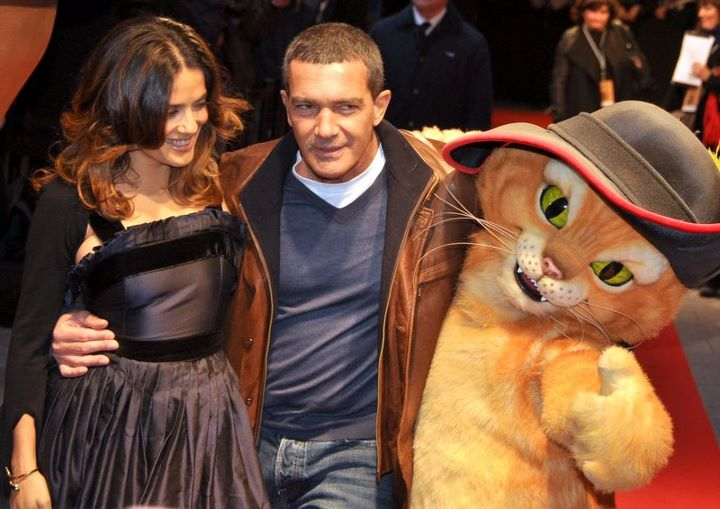
Salma Hayek and Antonio Banderas at the premiere of Puss in Boots 3D in Paris, 2011

Following the success of Puss in Boots, in November 2012, executive producer Guillermo del Toro shared director Chris Miller's intentions to take the titular character on an adventure to a "very exotic locale". He also stated that several drafts for the screenplay had already been completed. In April 2014, voice actor Antonio Banderas said work on the sequel had begun. On June 12, 2014, the movie was titled Puss in Boots 2: Nine Lives & 40 Thieves. In March 2015, Banderas said the script was under restructuring. He also hinted at the possibility of Shrek appearing in the film.

By November 2018, Illumination founder and CEO Chris Meledandri had been brought on board as an executive producer of both Shrek 5 and Puss in Boots 2. In February 2019, it was reported that Bob Persichetti was set to direct the film while Latifa Ouaou, producer of the first film, would oversee the development of the sequel with Meledandri; Persichetti previously worked on the first film as head of story. On August 19, 2020, DreamWorks trademarked Puss in Boots: The Last Wish as the new title of the sequel, which was approved in December. In March 2021, it was announced that Joel Crawford had replaced Persichetti as director, having previously helmed DreamWorks' The Croods: A New Age (2020), with producer Mark Swift, editor James Ryan, and screenwriter Paul Fisher returning as collaborators along with Januel Mercado serving as the film's co-director. Along with Salma Hayek (now credited as Salma Hayek Pinault) reprising her voice role, new cast members were announced in March 2022, including Harvey Guillén, Florence Pugh, Olivia Colman, Ray Winstone, Samson Kayo, John Mulaney, Wagner Moura, Da'Vine Joy Randolph, and Anthony Mendez.

=== Writing ===
The various stages of production used to depict the scene of Perrito comforting Puss, who is having a panic attack. From top to bottom: the storyboard, a screenshot of the unrendered footage, and a screenshot of the final film.

While wanting the film to retain the adult humor from previous entries, Crawford also wanted the film to have a darker tone, with Puss' mortality and fear of death being the film's main focus, wanting to use the concept of Puss being in his last life to tell a story about how to enjoy life. Swift felt the Shrek franchise being over 20 years old by the time the project entered production allowed the film to explore darker themes than its predecessors. He drew inspiration from fairytales by the Brothers Grimm and how they were "cautionary tales that took you somewhere dark to make you appreciate the light". This also influenced the decision to depict Death as a wolf, as wolves in Brothers Grimm's stories were depicted as "the personification of fear". Other influences for the film include Spaghetti Western films, due to how those films managed to balance between different tones. The Good, The Bad, and the Ugly (1966) was cited as a particular influence on the film's plot.

Crawford said he wanted the film's comedy to be "edgy" in the vein of Shrek (2001), aiming to honor what audiences loved from previous entries, although still wanting to do something different with the franchise instead of retreading familiar ground. He also was interested in including more characters from the franchise, but not at the expense of the film's story. He also felt that "one foot of Puss in Boots is dipped in the Shrek fairy tale world, but another one is in the spaghetti western world", and aiming to balance both aspects influenced certain decisions for the film.

For the film's opening sequence, the producers didn't want to simply re-introduce the character to general audiences, but also to "[introduce] the world to where the character is now" by establishing him as a celebrity, with the writers drawing inspiration from Mick Jagger. Crawford wanted Puss to start the film as a "larger than life"-type of figure who comes to embrace his vulnerability. Swift described the story as being about Puss "[having] to figure out who am I without all the things that people value in me?". The idea of featuring a scene of Puss having a panic attack was conceived after the team deemed Puss expressing his vulnerabilities verbally as "insincere", whereas a panic attack was seen as a "natural point" for the character that would force Puss to "let down the facade of being a fearless hero". For the scene, Crawford and storyboard artist Taylor Meacham drew from their personal experiences.

=== Animation and design ===
As with DreamWorks' previous film The Bad Guys (2022), the film's design was inspired by Sony Pictures Animation's Spider-Man: Into the Spider-Verse (2018), to make the film look more like storybook illustrations, from an idea suggested by production designer Nate Wragg. In February 2019, Into the Spider-Verse director Persichetti was set to direct Puss in Boots: The Last Wish, before Crawford replaced him in March 2021. Using new technology, the team at DreamWorks focused more on a painterly style design, to make the film look like a fairy-tale world, different from what it was in Shrek from their defunct studio Pacific Data Images.

== Music ==
Heitor Pereira composed the film's score, replacing Henry Jackman from the first film. Additionally, three original songs were made for the film by Karol G, Daniel Oviedo, Pereira, Paul Fisher, Dan Navarro, and Gaby Moreno. Karol G performs "La Vida es Una", co-written by herself and Daniel Oviedo and released on December 8, 2022 while Heitor Pereira co-wrote two songs titled "Fearless Hero", performed by Antonio Banderas and co-written by Dan Navarro and Paul Fisher, and "Por Que Te Vas", co-written with and performed by Gaby Moreno. The soundtrack was released on December 16, 2022, by Back Lot Music, in addition to cover of the Doors' "This Is the End" performed by Dan Navarro. Music from Shrek 2 was used in the film by Harry Gregson-Williams from the tracks "Obliged to Help" and "The End / Happily Ever After".

== Release ==
=== Theatrical ===
Puss in Boots: The Last Wish premiered at Lincoln Center in New York City on December 13, 2022, and was theatrically released on December 21, 2022. It was originally scheduled to be released on November 2, 2018, and later on December 21, 2018, before it was removed from the release schedule altogether in January 2015 due to corporate restructuring and DreamWorks Animation's new policy to release two films a year. Upon the project's resurrection, it was given a release date of September 23, 2022, in March 2021, but in April 2022, the release date was moved to its current December 21 date, taking over the release of Illumination's The Super Mario Bros. Movie. A one-day public screening occurred on November 26, 2022, in select theaters.

The first thirty minutes of the film were shown at the Annecy International Animation Film Festival in June 2022. Critics noted the darker tone of the movie when compared to its predecessor and director Joel Crawford agreed with them, mentioning that Puss' "fear of death is the engine that drives the movie".

The film also debuted a new animated logo opening for DreamWorks Animation, showcasing characters from The Bad Guys, How to Train Your Dragon, Kung Fu Panda, The Boss Baby, Trolls, and Shrek with a remastered rendition of the 2010 fanfare composed by Harry Gregson-Williams mixed with several notes from the 2019 fanfare composed by John Powell, produced by Suzanne Buirgy from Abominable and Kendall Cronkhite from Trolls served as the production designer.

=== Home media ===
Puss in Boots: The Last Wish was released digitally on January 6, 2023, 16 days after its theatrical release.

A 4-minute CGI animated short film, Puss in Boots: The Trident, was released as part of the digital release of Puss in Boots: The Last Wish Collector's Edition on February 21, 2023, and later released on Ultra HD Blu-ray, Blu-ray, and DVD on February 28. The short sees Eric Bauza reprising his role as Puss from The Adventures of Puss in Boots.

The film grossed $7.6 million in home sales.

== Reception ==
=== Box office ===
Puss in Boots: The Last Wish grossed $186.1 million in the United States and Canada, and $298.2 million in other territories, for a worldwide total of $484.3 million. It is the tenth-highest-grossing film of 2022. Deadline Hollywood calculated the film's net profit as $120.2 million, accounting for production budgets, marketing, talent participations, and other costs; box office grosses and home media revenues placed it eighth on their list of 2022's "Most Valuable Blockbusters". By March 2023, it ultimately became a sleeper hit, which was attributed to positive feedback, word-of-mouth, and minimal competition from family films.

In the United States and Canada, Puss in Boots: The Last Wish was projected to gross $25–30 million from 4,099 theaters over its five-day opening weekend. The film made $3.2 million on its first day and $2.9 million on its second, with The Hollywood Reporter noting that Winter Storm Elliot and the threat of a tripledemic surge in COVID-19 and flu cases could affect the box office in the subsequent days. It went on to debut to $12.4 million in its opening weekend (and an estimated total of $26.2 million over the six days), finishing second behind holdover Avatar: The Way of Water. Despite opening below projections, Universal's president of domestic distribution Jim Orr and box office analysts believed the film could make up ground in the coming weeks through word-of-mouth and schools being on holiday. In its second weekend, Puss in Boots: The Last Wish grew 35% from its debut weekend, grossing $16.8 million. Its third weekend, the film fell 19% with $13.5 million, which was the first non-holiday weekend in its run. The film made $14.5 million in its fourth weekend and $18.9 million over the four day Martin Luther King Jr. Weekend (Friday–Monday) while also crossing the $100 million mark at the United States and Canadian box office. Puss in Boots: The Last Wish was the tenth highest-grossing film of 2022 in the United States and Canada, and completed its domestic theatrical run on April 20, 2023.

=== Critical response ===
The film received critical acclaim, with praise for its story, animation, and voice performances. On the review aggregator website Rotten Tomatoes, 95% of 196 critics' reviews are positive, with an average rating of 7.6/10. The website's consensus reads: "Arriving more than a decade after the previous installment, the smart, sweet, and funny Puss in Boots: The Last Wish proves some franchises only get better with age." Metacritic, which uses a weighted average, assigned the film a score of 73 out of 100, based on 29 critics, indicating "generally favorable" reviews. Audiences polled by CinemaScore gave the film an average grade of "A" on an A+ to F scale, while PostTrak reported 89% of audience members gave it a positive score.

IGN's Rafael Motamayor gave a rating of 9 out of 10 and wrote: "Puss in Boots: The Last Wish mixes stunning animation with a poignant, surprisingly mature story to deliver the Shrek franchise's answer to Logan we didn't know we needed." Christy Lemire of RogerEbert.com wrote that after a "roaring start", the film "sags a bit in the midsection as it becomes clear that we're in for a pretty standard quest." She did, however, praise that the film manages to "convey messages of selflessness and teamwork in a way that doesn't feel heavy-handed or cloying", along with the voice performances and visuals. Ed Potton for The Times gave the film 4 out of 5 stars describing the film's tone as "Goldilocks-right — not too scary, not too bland" with stylish fight sequences. Nate Richard of Collider gave the film an A−, saying: "Nothing in Puss in Boots: The Last Wish feels lazy, it more than justifies the long wait. It is not only one of the best animated films of the year, but it's one of DreamWorks' best and one that will strike a chord with moviegoers of all ages. It's equal parts exciting and hilarious as well as earnest, it never feels like it is talking down to anyone. With The Bad Guys and now Puss in Boots: The Last Wish, it is more than safe to say that DreamWorks is back and (maybe) better than ever."

Peter Debruge of Variety gave the film a positive review, saying the film was "DWA's best film since the How to Train Your Dragon trilogy." Maxance Vincent of Loud and Clear gave the film four out of five stars, saying: "Puss in Boots: The Last Wish is finally giving me hope that the Shrek franchise may not be dead yet. The film opens with one of the most thrilling action set pieces I've seen in an animated film all year (and probably the most thrilling one, since I won't watch another animated film before the end of the year), impeccably scored by Heitor Perreira as our titular character (Antonio Banderas) sings 'Who is our favorite fearless hero?' as he battles a giant. I was locked into the movie, and there was no going back." Emma Stefansky of IndieWire also gave a positive review, enjoying the fact that the film "has no qualms about testing the expectations of its young audience while delivering a freewheeling tale about appreciating the nine lives we already have." Frank Scheck of The Hollywood Reporter gave the film a positive review, finding the film "darker in tone but still extremely funny", even though it "falters when resorting to the frenetic action sequences seemingly designed for tykes' short attention spans." He also praised Banderas's and the supporting cast's voice work, claiming that "Too often, animated films feature supremely overpaid and overqualified voice casts whom children, and most adults, couldn't care less about. Banderas, on the other hand, is worth every penny."

William Bibbiani of TheWrap gave the film a mixed review, summarizing that "there are comic moments that land, and action set pieces that pop, but the overwhelming sensation here is a meditation on the inevitability of death." Robbie Collin gave the film a mixed review and 3 out of 5 stars for The Daily Telegraph praising the wolf character as "deliciously scary" and "genuinely spooky" but he found the film to be "almost defiantly hopeless at emotion: the tone is teeth-gnashingly manic throughout, while the underlying point of Puss’s quest is obscured by continuous flurries of slapstick and quips." Peter Bradshaw writing for The Guardian gave the film a negative 2 out of 5 stars calling it "bland and forgettable" and describing the film as "a huge 102-minute additional scene."

In December 2024, Collider ranked the film at number 3 on its list of the "10 Best Fantasy Movies of the 2020s," with Robert Lee III writing "Easily one of the most acclaimed and exceptional movies to come from DreamWorks Animation in years, Puss in Boots: The Last Wish revitalized the long-since dormant Shrek franchise as if it had never left." Empire ranked the film number 45 of the "50 Best Kids Movies" describing it as "surprisingly stellar" with a "dazzling animation style" along with "thrillingly-crafted action setpieces."

=== Accolades ===
Accolades received by Puss in Boots: The Last Wish
Award	Date of ceremony	Category	Recipient(s)	Result	Ref.
Academy Awards	March 12, 2023	Best Animated Feature Film	Joel Crawford and Mark Swift	Nominated	
Alliance of Women Film Journalists Awards	January 5, 2023	Best Animated Film	Puss in Boots: The Last Wish	Nominated	
Alliance of Women Film Journalists Awards	January 5, 2023	Best Animated Female	Salma Hayek Pinault	Nominated	
American Cinema Editors Awards	March 5, 2023	Best Edited Animated Feature Film	James Ryan	Nominated	
Annie Awards	February 25, 2023	Best Animated Feature	Puss in Boots: The Last Wish	Nominated	
Annie Awards	February 25, 2023	Outstanding Achievement for Character Design in an Animated Feature Production	Jesús Alonso Iglesias	Nominated	
Annie Awards	February 25, 2023	Outstanding Achievement for Editorial in an Animated Feature Production	James Ryan, Jacquelyn Karambelas, Natalla Cronembold, Joe Butler, and Katie Parody	Won	
Annie Awards	February 25, 2023	Outstanding Achievement for Production Design in an Animated Feature Production	Nate Wragg, Joseph Feinsilver, Claire Keane, Wayne Tsay, and Naveen Selvanathan	Nominated	
Annie Awards	February 25, 2023	Outstanding Achievement for Storyboarding in an Animated Feature Production	Anthony Holden	Won	
Annie Awards	February 25, 2023	Outstanding Achievement for Voice Acting in an Animated Feature Production	Wagner Moura	Nominated	
Art Directors Guild Awards	February 18, 2023	Excellence in Production Design for an Animated Film	Nate Wragg	Nominated	
Artios Awards	March 9, 2023	Animation	Christi Soper Hilt	Nominated	
British Academy Film Awards	February 19, 2023	Best Animated Film	Joel Crawford and Mark Swift	Nominated	
Cinema Audio Society Awards	March 4, 2023	Outstanding Achievement in Sound Mixing for a Motion Picture – Animated	Ken Gombos, Julian Slater, Greg P. Russell, Alan Meyerson, and Ryan Squires	Nominated	
Critics' Choice Movie Awards	January 15, 2023	Best Animated Feature	Puss in Boots: The Last Wish	Nominated	
Dorian Awards	February 23, 2023	Animated Film of the Year	Puss in Boots: The Last Wish	Nominated	
Georgia Film Critics Association Awards	January 13, 2023	Best Animated Film	Puss in Boots: The Last Wish	Nominated	
Golden Globe Awards	January 10, 2023	Best Animated Feature Film	Puss in Boots: The Last Wish	Nominated	
Golden Reel Awards	February 26, 2023	Outstanding Achievement in Sound Editing – Feature Animation	Jason W. Jennings, Julian Slater, Tim Walston, Ken McGill, Mia Stewart, and Paul Pirola	Nominated	
Golden Trailer Awards	June 29, 2023	Best Animation/Family TV Spot (for a Feature Film)	"Tales of Old" (Inside Job)	Nominated	
Golden Trailer Awards	June 29, 2023	Best Digital – Animation/Family	"Most Interesting Cat" (Paradise Creative)	Nominated	
Golden Trailer Awards	June 29, 2023	Most Innovative Advertising for a Feature Film	"Hot Ones" (Inside Job)	Won	
Golden Trailer Awards	June 29, 2023	Best Animation TrailerByte for a Feature Film	"Pandora's Box" (Inside Job)	Nominated	
Hollywood Critics Association Awards	February 24, 2023	Best Voice or Motion-Capture Performance	Antonio Banderas	Nominated	
Hollywood Critics Association Awards	February 24, 2023	Best Animated Film	Puss in Boots: The Last Wish	Nominated	
Hollywood Music in Media Awards	November 16, 2022	Best Original Score in an Animated Film	Heitor Pereira	Nominated	
Hollywood Professional Association Awards	November 28, 2023	Outstanding Sound – Feature Film	Jason W. Jennings, Julian Slater, Greg P. Russell, Paul Pirola, Ken McGill, and Mia Stewart (Warner Bros. Post Production Services)	Nominated	
Houston Film Critics Society Awards	February 18, 2023	Best Animated Feature	Puss in Boots: The Last Wish	Nominated	
London Film Critics' Circle Awards	February 5, 2023	British Actress of the Year	Olivia Colman (Note: Also for Empire of Light, Joyride, and Scrooge: A Christmas Carol)	Nominated	
London Film Critics' Circle Awards	February 5, 2023	British Actress of the Year	Florence Pugh (Note: Also for Don't Worry Darling and The Wonder)	Won	
Movieguide Awards	February 26, 2023	Best Movies for Families	Puss in Boots: The Last Wish	Won (Note: Tied with Sonic the Hedgehog 2)	
NAACP Image Awards	February 25, 2023	Outstanding Animated Motion Picture	Puss in Boots: The Last Wish	Nominated	
Nickelodeon Kids' Choice Awards	March 4, 2023	Favorite Female Voice from an Animated Movie	Salma Hayek Pinault	Nominated	
Online Film Critics Society Awards	January 23, 2023	Best Animated Feature	Puss in Boots: The Last Wish	Nominated	
People for the Ethical Treatment of Animals	March 2, 2023	Best Animated Feature	Puss in Boots: The Last Wish	Won	
Producers Guild of America Awards	February 25, 2023	Outstanding Producer of Animated Theatrical Motion Pictures	Mark Swift	Nominated	
San Diego Film Critics Society Awards	January 6, 2023	Best Animated Film	Puss in Boots: The Last Wish	Nominated	
San Francisco Bay Area Film Critics Circle Awards	January 9, 2023	Best Animated Feature	Puss in Boots: The Last Wish	Nominated	
Saturn Awards	February 4, 2024	Best Animated Film	Puss in Boots: The Last Wish	Nominated	
Seattle Film Critics Society Awards	January 17, 2023	Best Animated Feature	Puss in Boots: The Last Wish	Nominated	
Visual Effects Society Awards	February 15, 2023	Outstanding Effects Simulations in an Animated Feature	Derek Cheung, Michael Losure, Kiem Ching Ong, and Jinguang Huang	Won	
