= Shrek Forever After =

2010 DreamWorks Animation film

- Theatrical release poster
- Directed by: Mike Mitchell
- Written by: Josh Klausner; Darren Lemke
- Based on: Shrek! by William Steig
- Produced by: Gina Shay; Teresa Cheng
- Starring: Mike Myers; Eddie Murphy; Cameron Diaz; Antonio Banderas; Julie Andrews; John Cleese; Walt Dohrn
- Cinematography: Yong Duk Jhun
- Edited by: Nick Fletcher
- Music by: Harry Gregson-Williams
- Production company: DreamWorks Animation
- Distributed by: Paramount Pictures (Note: In July 2014, the film's distribution rights were purchased by DreamWorks Animation from Paramount Pictures and transferred to 20th Century Fox before reverting to Universal Pictures in 2018 following NBCUniversal's acquisition of DreamWorks Animation in 2016.)
- Release dates: April 21, 2010 (Tribeca Film Festival); May 21, 2010 (United States)
- Running time: 93 minutes
- Country: United States
- Language: English
- Budget: $135–165 million
- Box office: $756.2 million

Shrek Forever After (Note: Also known as Shrek 4, previously promoted as Shrek Goes Fourth and Shrek: The Final Chapter, and released on home media as Shrek Forever After: The Final Chapter.) is a 2010 American animated fantasy comedy film loosely based on the 1990 children's picture book Shrek! by William Steig. Directed by Mike Mitchell, and written by Josh Klausner and Darren Lemke, it is the sequel to Shrek the Third (2007) and the fourth installment in the Shrek franchise. The film stars Mike Myers, Eddie Murphy, Cameron Diaz, Antonio Banderas, Julie Andrews, and John Cleese reprising their voice roles from the previous films, with Walt Dohrn joining the cast. The story follows Shrek, now a domesticated family man and local celebrity, longing for his days of solitude and being feared, leading him to make a magic deal with the deceitful imp Rumpelstiltskin, which creates grave consequences.

Shrek Forever After premiered at the Tribeca Film Festival on April 21, 2010, and was theatrically released by Paramount Pictures in the United States on May 21. The film received mixed reviews from critics and grossed $756 million, becoming the fifth-highest-grossing film of 2010.

Although intended to be the final film in the series, a fifth film currently titled Shrek 5 was announced in 2024 and is slated for release on June 30, 2027. Two spin-off films, Puss in Boots (2011) and Puss in Boots: The Last Wish (2022), have also been released, while a spin-off centered around Donkey is in development.

== Plot ==
Years ago, King Harold and Queen Lillian lost hope that their daughter, Princess Fiona, would be freed from her curse after so many years of her being at the Dragon's Keep. Despite their deal with Fairy Godmother, they go to Rumpelstiltskin for help. He has a magical contract that will seemingly lift the curse if they give him the Kingdom of Far Far Away, but when Harold is about to sign it, a messenger reveals that Fiona has been rescued by Shrek. (Note: As depicted in Shrek (2001).) Ever since, Rumpelstiltskin has held a grudge against Shrek for ruining his plan.

In the present, Shrek has grown tired of being a family man and a celebrity, longing for the days when he was feared and had privacy. While he is celebrating his children's first birthday in Far Far Away, a series of mishaps leaves Shrek so angry that he storms out in a rage and lashes out at Fiona. Having witnessed the outburst, Rumpel follows Shrek into the forest and stages a scene of being in distress, prompting Shrek to help.

Invited inside Rumpel's carriage, Shrek laments that he is no longer a "real ogre". Rumpel offers him a deal to receive a day as a "real ogre" in exchange for a day from his childhood being erased. Shrek signs a contract fulfilling this wish, and is whisked away into an alternate reality.

Now feared by villagers, Shrek causes some mischief until he discovers that Fiona is a fugitive and his swamp is deserted and desolate. Captured by witches, Shrek is taken to Rumpel, who is now the king of a dystopian Far Far Away where ogres are enslaved. Rumpel reveals to Shrek that he had erased the day Shrek was born, meaning he never existed in this altered timeline. Consequently, Harold and Lillian signed the contract with Rumpel, which caused them to disappear, and he became the ruler. When the day ends, Shrek will cease to exist.

Shrek escapes Rumpel's castle with Donkey, who is initially terrified of Shrek but befriends him after seeing him cry over his erased history. Donkey helps Shrek find a hidden exit clause; the contract can be nullified by "true love's kiss". The pair soon encounter a still-cursed Fiona leading an army of ogres in a resistance against Rumpel, and a lazy and overweight Puss in Boots being kept as Fiona's pet. Shrek unsuccessfully tries to woo Fiona, who has since lost hope of finding true love after not being rescued, and is too busy preparing an ambush on Rumpel. Puss encourages Shrek to continue pursuing Fiona.

During the ambush, most of the ogres are captured by the Pied Piper, who was hired by Rumpel, but Shrek and Fiona escape with Puss and Donkey. Shrek insists that Fiona kiss him, assuring her that it will fix everything; she reluctantly obliges, but nothing happens, realizing that only a true love's kiss can break it. Later on, Rumpel publicly offers a wish to anyone who brings him Shrek, and after hearing this, Shrek turns himself in.

Rumpel is forced to grant Shrek's wish, which Shrek uses to free the other ogres. As Shrek is locked up, Rumpel reveals that Fiona had been captured and not released, since she is not "all ogre". Rumpel attempts to execute Shrek and Fiona with the enslaved Dragon, but Donkey, Puss, and the freed ogres storm the castle; they capture Rumpel and defeat his witch army, while Shrek and Fiona neutralize Dragon.

As the sun rises, Shrek begins to fade from existence, but Fiona, having fallen in love with him, kisses him before he disappears. Seeing that she is still an ogre in the sunlight, Fiona realizes that her curse was broken and that she has assumed "love's true form". The alternate reality disintegrates, and Shrek finds himself transported back to the original timeline at the moment before he lost his temper at the party. Instead of lashing out, Shrek embraces his family and friends with a newfound appreciation for them. Later, Shrek hosts a party in his swamp with his friends, family, and the other ogres, with an imprisoned Rumpel in attendance.

== Voice cast ==
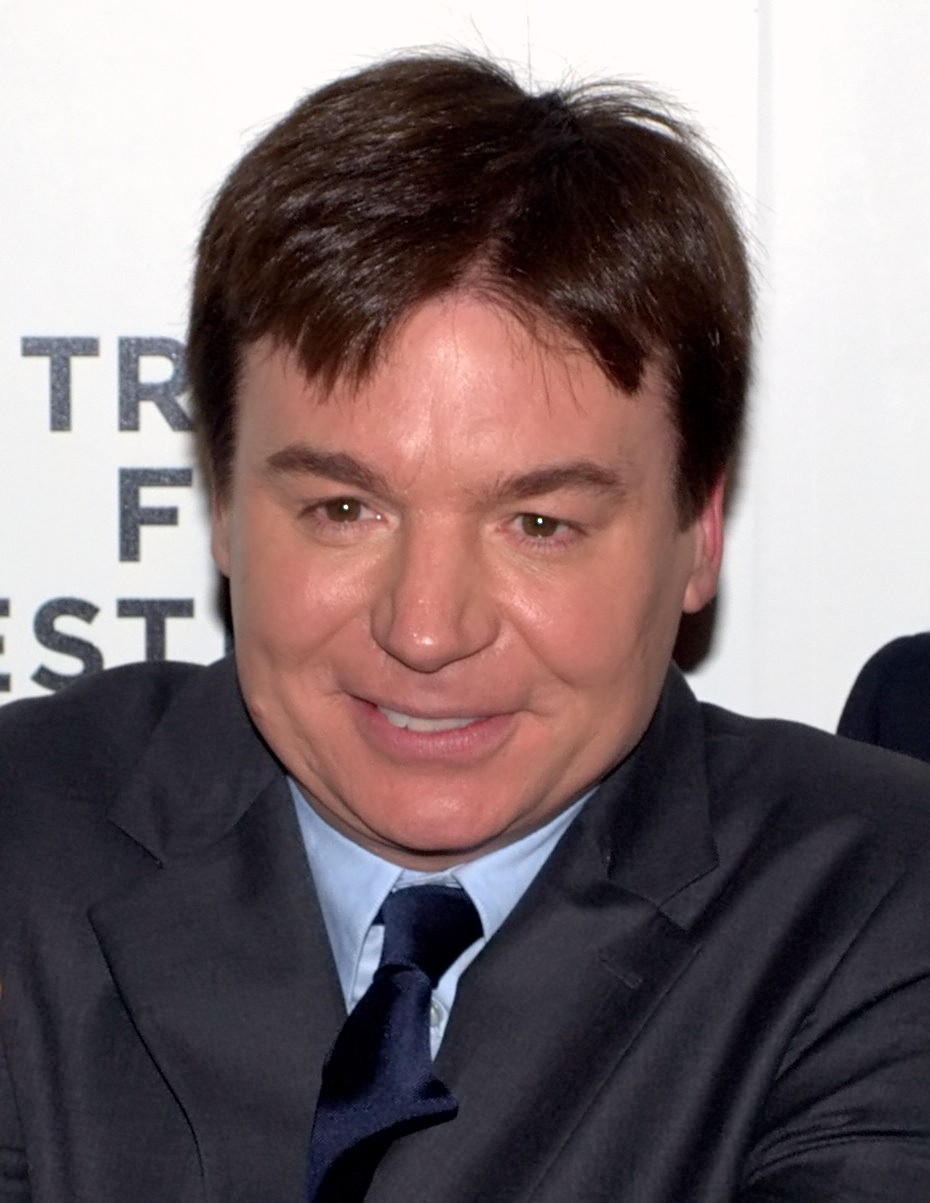
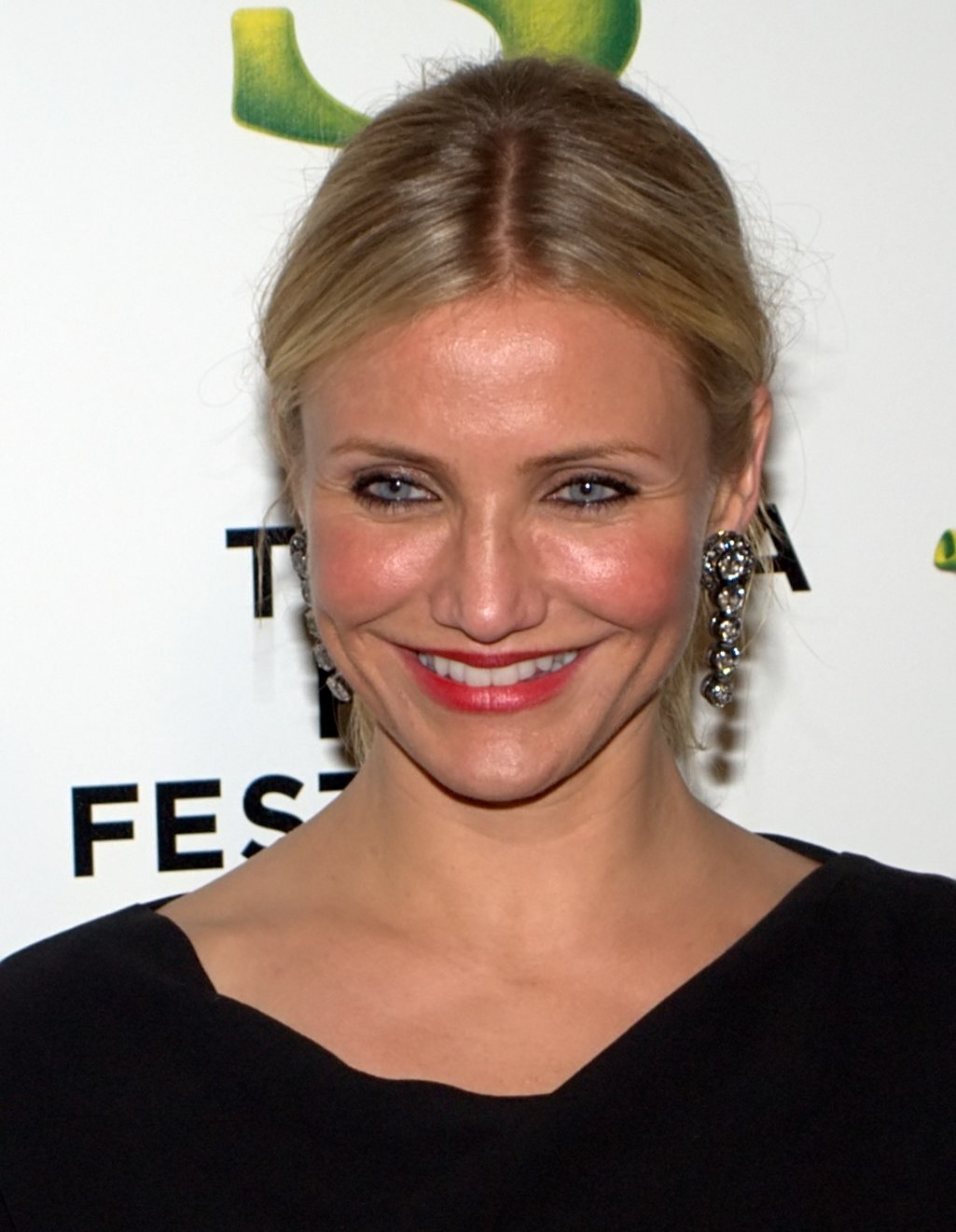
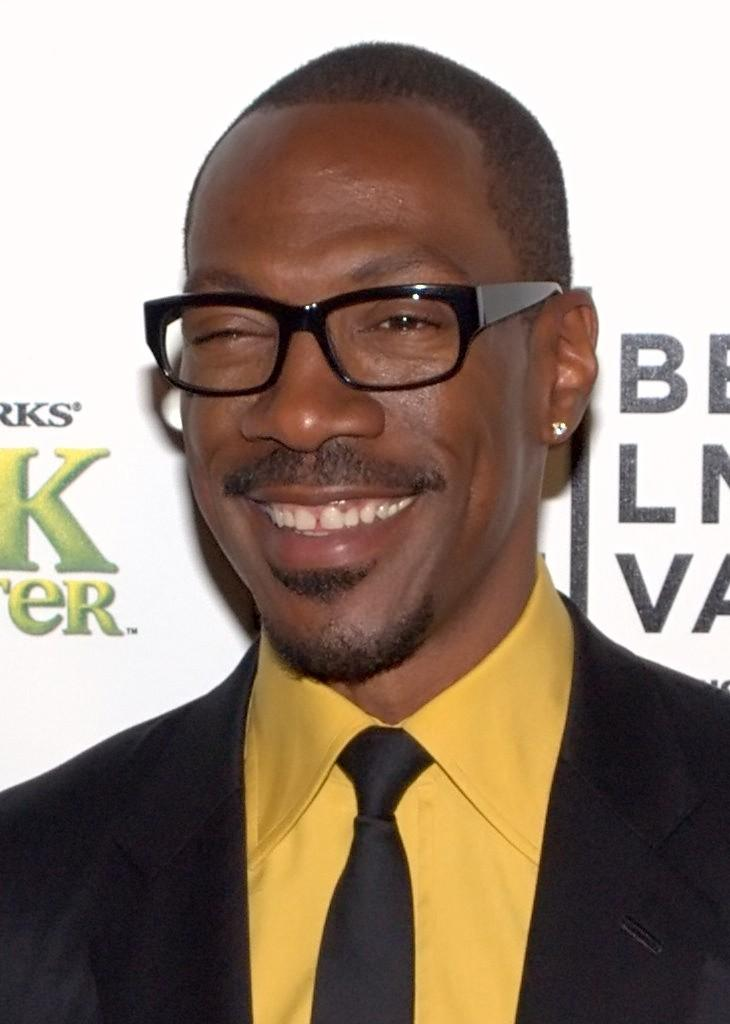
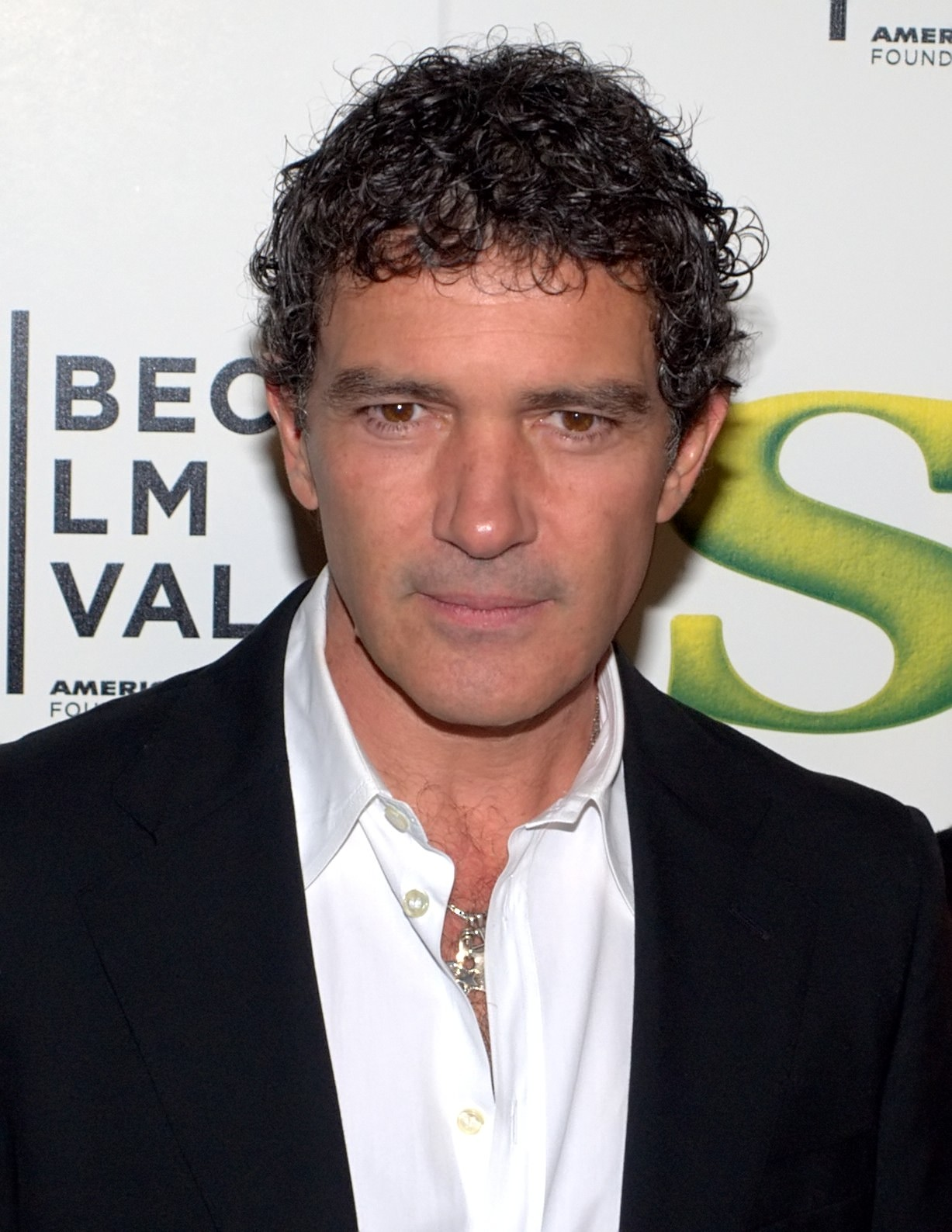
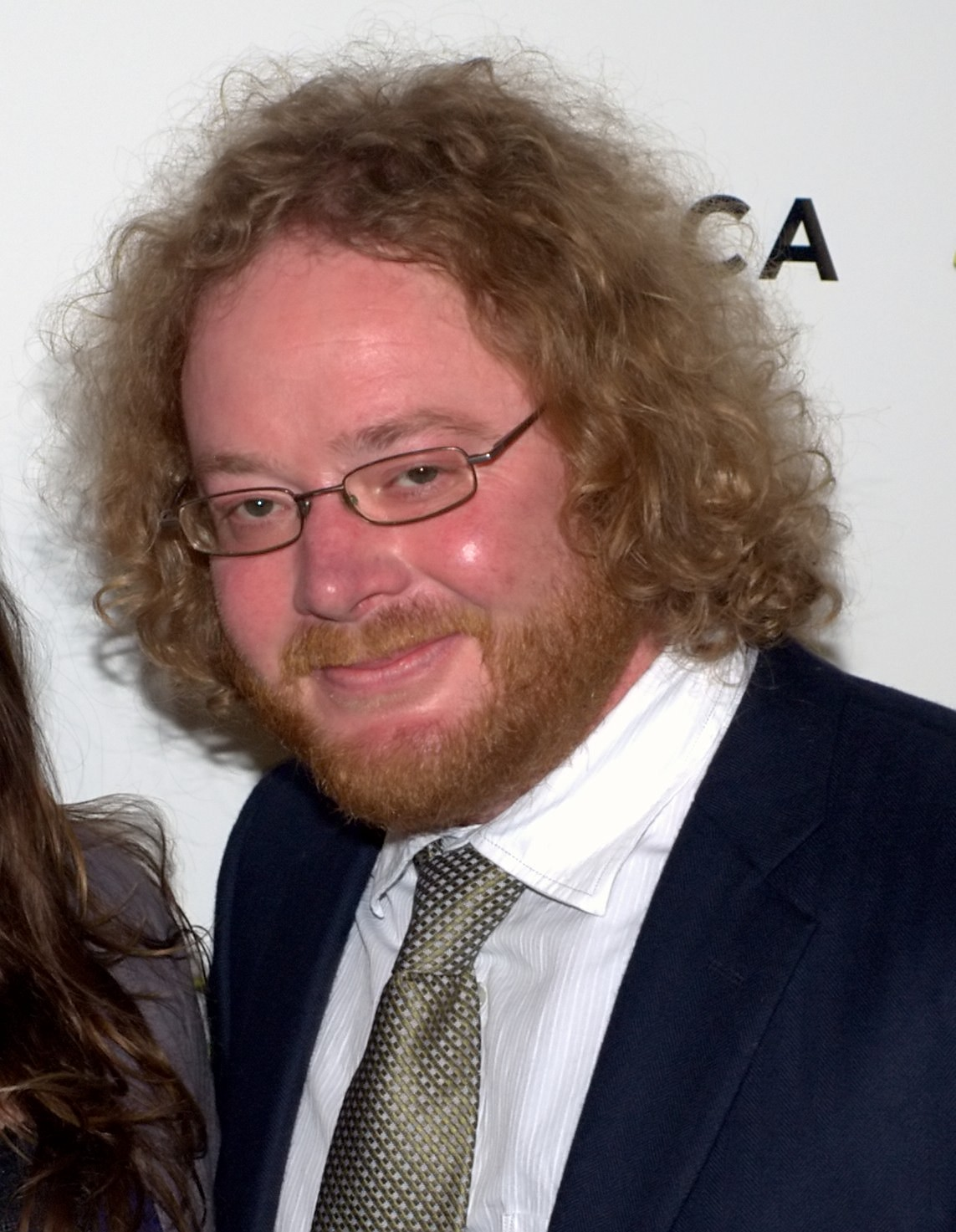
Mike Myers, Cameron Diaz, Eddie Murphy, Antonio Banderas, and Walt Dohrn at the premiere of the film at the 2010 Tribeca Film Festival.
- Mike Myers as Shrek
- Eddie Murphy as Donkey
- Cameron Diaz as Princess Fiona
- Antonio Banderas as Puss in Boots
- Julie Andrews as Queen Lillian
- John Cleese as King Harold
- Walt Dohrn as Rumpelstiltskin
- Jon Hamm as Brogan the Ogre
- Jane Lynch as Gretched the Ogre
- Craig Robinson as Cookie the Ogre
- Lake Bell as Patrol Witch and Wagon Witch No. 2
- Kathy Griffin as Dancing Witch and Wagon Witch No. 1
- Mary Kay Place as Witch Guard No. 1
- Kristen Schaal as Pumpkin Witch and Palace Witch
- Meredith Vieira as Broomsy Witch
- Ryan Seacrest as Father of Butter Pants
- Cody Cameron as Pinocchio and Three Pigs
- Larry King as Doris the Ugly Stepsister
- Regis Philbin as Mabel the Ugly Stepsister
- Christopher Knights as Blind Mice
- Conrad Vernon as Gingerbread Man and Muffin Man
- Aron Warner as Wolf
- Dante James Hauser as Fergus
- Billie Hayes as Cackling Witch
- Chris Miller as Magic Mirror and Geppetto
- Jeremy Steig as Pied Piper
- Mike Mitchell as Witch Guard No. 2 and Butter Pants

== Production ==
After the success of Shrek 2 in May 2004, DreamWorks Animation (DWA) CEO Jeffrey Katzenberg planned a five-film arc that began with Shrek (2001) and would conclude with a fifth installment. In May 2007, Katzenberg was reported to announce Shrek 4 as a prequel centered on Shrek's origin story, promising that the film would explain how Shrek ended up in the swamp of the first film. National Geographic Kids claimed that a deleted scene of Shrek the Third in which a talking tree explained to Arthur Pendragon that he was the next in line for the Far Far Away throne could be used in the fourth film. One early story draft thus included a flashback sequence set in Shrek's adolescence.

In October 2007, Katzenberg announced a title for the fourth film, Shrek Goes Fourth, explaining that "Shrek goes out into the world, forth!"

In May 2009, DreamWorks Animation retitled the film to Shrek Forever After.

In November 2009, Bill Damaschke, head of creative production at DreamWorks Animation, confirmed with "All that was loved about Shrek in the first film is brought to the final film". The film included many tributes to the original Shrek film such as Shrek asking the villagers to run away or Princess Fiona blowing up a bird with her singing as well as some to the second film like Puss in Boots facing Shrek for the first time, as it was the crew's intention to sum up all the other Shrek films with Shrek Forever After to make it the last film.

Tim Sullivan was hired to write the script in March 2005, but was later replaced by Darren Lemke and Josh Klausner. Klausner, about the script's evolution, said, "When I first came onto the project, it wasn't supposed to be the final chapter—there were originally going to be 5 Shrek movies. Then, about a year into the development, Jeffrey Katzenberg decided that the story that we'd come up with was the right way for Shrek's journey to end, which was incredibly flattering." In May 2007, shortly before the release of the third film, it was announced Mike Mitchell would be on board to direct the new installment. Mitchell felt the influence of It's a Wonderful Life within the film's plot, but made sure to rather homage the storytelling over parodying it, embracing the concept that Shrek isn't the same ogre he was at the start of the original film.

Much of the film was written and recorded in New York City.

== Soundtrack ==
Like the other Shrek films, the film's original score was composed by Harry Gregson-Williams.

== Release ==
=== Theatrical ===
Shrek Forever After premiered at the Tribeca Film Festival on April 21, 2010. It was publicly released on May 20, 2010, in Russia, while the American release followed the next day on May 21. In July 2014, the film's distribution rights were purchased by DreamWorks Animation from Paramount Pictures and transferred to 20th Century Fox before reverting to Universal Pictures in 2018 following NBCUniversal's acquisition of DreamWorks Animation in 2016.

=== Merchandise ===
In 2010, McDonald's released a series of drinking glasses which featured painted characters from Shrek Forever After. The painted designs contained the toxic metal cadmium, which provided concerns about the long-term exposure of cadmium from the Shrek glasses. As a result, McDonald's offered a recall of the 12 million drinking glasses and paid customers to return them.

=== Home media ===
Shrek Forever After (marketed as Shrek Forever After: The Final Chapter) was released on DVD, Blu-ray 3D and Blu-ray on December 7, 2010, and made $76.5 million in DVD and Blu-ray sales. The film is also included in Shrek: The Whole Story, a box set released on the same day that included all four Shrek films and additional bonus content. It was later released on 4K on June 11, 2024, along with a 4-Movie Collection release featuring all four films on 4K, by Universal Pictures Home Entertainment.

== Reception ==
=== Box office ===
Shrek Forever After earned $238.7 million in North America, and $513.9 million in other countries, for a worldwide total of $752.6 million, making it the fifth highest-grossing film of 2010.

Shrek Forever After had the widest release for an animated film (4,359 theaters, later expanded to 4,386) in North America. On its opening day (May 21, 2010), it ranked No.1, grossing $20.8 million, which was lower than the opening days of the last two Shrek films. The film then opened in three days with $70.8 million, lower than box office analysts' predictions of an opening of $105 million and also lower than the two previous films of the franchise. Anne Globe, head of worldwide marketing for DreamWorks Animation, said they were "happy with the film's opening" since it debuted at No. 1 and also had the fourth-best opening for an animated film, at the time, in the United States and Canada. Shrek Forever After was the number one film for three consecutive weekends.

In North America, executives at DreamWorks Animation were impressed because the film earned $238.7 million in North America, although it was the fourth film in the series, seemingly being outgrown by its fans. It ended its box office run ranked domestically as the eighth highest-grossing film of 2010.

Outside North America, it topped the weekend box office once on July 16–18, 2010 with $46.3 million. In Russia and CIS, its second-highest-grossing country, it had a $19.7 million opening weekend which was a record among animated films. It earned $51.4 million in total. Third in total earnings came the United Kingdom, Ireland and Malta, where it opened with £8.96 million ($13.6 million) and finished its box office run with £31.1 million ($51.1 million). At the end of its box office run, Shrek Forever After became DreamWorks Animation's highest grossing animated film at the international box office.

=== Critical response ===
On review aggregation website Rotten Tomatoes, Shrek Forever After had an approval rating of 58% based on 195 reviews and an average rating of 6.1/10. The site's critical consensus read, "While not without its moments, Shrek Forever After too often feels like a rote rehashing of the franchise's earlier entries." On Metacritic, the film had a weighted average score of 58 out of 100, based on 35 critics, indicating "mixed or average reviews". Audiences polled by CinemaScore gave the film an average grade of "A" on an A+ to F scale, the same score earned by Shrek and Shrek 2 and a step up from the "B+" earned by Shrek the Third.

Stephen Holden of The New York Times stated "What fortifies “Shrek Forever After” are its brilliantly realized principal characters, who nearly a decade after the first “Shrek” film remain as vital and engaging fusions of image, personality and voice as any characters in the history of animation." Pete Hammond of BoxOffice gave the film four and a half out of five stars and wrote, "Hilarious and heartfelt from start to finish, this is the best Shrek of them all, and that's no fairy tale. Borrowing liberally from Frank Capra's It's a Wonderful Life, this edition blends big laughs and emotion to explore what Far Far Away might have been like if Shrek never existed." James Berardinelli of Reelviews awarded the film three out of four stars and wrote, "Even though Shrek Forever After is obligatory and unnecessary, it's better than Shrek the Third and it's likely that most who attend as a way of saying goodbye to the Jolly Green Ogre will not find themselves wishing they had sought out a more profitable way of spending 90-odd minutes."

James White of Empire gave the film four out of five stars, saying, "DreamWorks could be entering a period of fresh creativity. With How to Train Your Dragon and a balanced, darker-hued and very funny Shrek finale, they've found the magic again". Lisa Schwarzbaum of Entertainment Weekly gave the film a "B−" grade, saying "Everyone involved fulfills his or her job requirements adequately. But the magic is gone and Shrek Forever After is no longer an ogre phenomenon to reckon with." Peter Travers of Rolling Stone wrote "It's a fun ride. What's missing is the excitement of a new interpretation." Mary Pols of Time stated in her review "Can an ogre jump a shark? I think so."

=== Accolades ===
Accolades received by Shrek Forever After
Award	Date of ceremony	Category	Recipient(s)	Result	Ref.
Annie Awards	February 5, 2011	Outstanding Achievement for Animated Effects in an Animated Production	Andrew Young Kim	Nominated	
Annie Awards	February 5, 2011	Outstanding Achievement for Music in a Feature Production	Harry Gregson-Williams	Nominated	
Annie Awards	February 5, 2011	Outstanding Achievement for Production Design in an Animated Feature Production	Peter Zaslav	Nominated	
Annie Awards	February 5, 2011	Outstanding Achievement for Storyboarding in a Feature Production	Paul Fisher	Nominated	
Annie Awards	February 5, 2011	Outstanding Achievement for Voice Acting in an Animated Feature Production	Cameron Diaz	Nominated	
British Academy Children's Awards	November 28, 2010	Kid's Vote — Film	Shrek Forever After	Nominated	
The Comedy Awards	March 26, 2011	Best Animated Comedy Movie	Shrek Forever After	Nominated	
Golden Trailer Awards	June 10, 2010	Best Animation/Family	"Best Ever" (Aspect Ratio)	Won	
Movieguide Awards	February 18, 2011	Best Movies for Families	Shrek Forever After	Nominated	
National Movie Awards	May 26, 2010	Most Anticipated Movie Of The Summer	Shrek Forever After	Nominated	
Nickelodeon Kids' Choice Awards (Australia)	October 8, 2010	Fave Movie	Shrek Forever After	Nominated	
Nickelodeon Kids' Choice Awards (United States)	April 2, 2011	Favorite Animated Movie	Shrek Forever After	Nominated	
Nickelodeon Kids' Choice Awards (United States)	April 2, 2011	Favorite Voice From An Animated Movie	Eddie Murphy	Won	
Nickelodeon Kids' Choice Awards (United States)	April 2, 2011	Favorite Voice From An Animated Movie	Cameron Diaz	Nominated	
People's Choice Awards	January 5, 2011	Favorite Family Movie	Shrek Forever After	Nominated	
Saturn Awards	June 23, 2011	Best Animated Film	Shrek Forever After	Nominated	
Teen Choice Awards	August 8, 2010	Choice Movie: Animated Film	Shrek Forever After	Nominated	
Visual Effects Society Awards	February 1, 2011	Outstanding Visual Effects in an Animated Feature	Jason Reisig, Doug Cooper, Gina Shay, and Teresa Cheng	Nominated	
Visual Effects Society Awards	February 1, 2011	Outstanding Effects Animation in an Animated Feature Motion Picture	Jeff Budsberg, Andrew Kim, Yancy Lindquist, and Can Yuksel	Nominated	

== Video game ==
Shrek Forever After is an action-adventure video game based on the movie of the same name. It was released by Activision on May 18, 2010.

== Future ==
=== Sequel ===
In 2014, a Fox Business Network interview with DreamWorks CEO Jeffrey Katzenberg implied that more Shrek films would eventually be made saying, "But I think you can be confident that we'll have another chapter in the Shrek series. We're not finished and, more importantly, neither is he." Following the acquisition of DreamWorks Animation by Comcast and NBCUniversal in 2016, NBCUniversal President and CEO Steve Burke discussed plans to revive the franchise. In July 2016, The Hollywood Reporter cited sources saying that a fifth film was planned for a 2019 release. By late 2016, reports surfaced that the script had been completed.

In April 2023, four months after the release of a spin-off sequel Puss in Boots: The Last Wish, executive producer Chris Meledandri confirmed that a fifth film is planned, with the original cast in talks to return. In June 2024, Eddie Murphy announced that he had begun recording for Shrek 5. The film will release on June 30, 2027.

=== Spin-off ===
At the same time that Shrek 5 was revealed to be in development in April 2023, it was revealed that a spin-off film revolving around Donkey was in early talks as well. In June 2024, Eddie Murphy announced that the project was officially greenlit by DreamWorks, and stated that it would begin production following the completion of Shrek 5.

In May 2025, it was revealed that Chris Meledandri would be producing the film and that Christopher Knights would be editing the film. In July 2025, Murphy confirmed that voice recording would commence in September and that the story was centered on his character, his dragon wife and their hybrid kids. He noted the film was expected to be released in 2028.
