= Shrek: Ogres & Dronkeys =

2007 video game

- Developer: WayForward Technologies
- Publisher: Activision
- Director: Adam Tierney
- Producer: Jeff Pomegranate
- Designers: Adam Tierney; Lee McDole; Jonathan Rucker; John Eric Hart
- Programmer: Lee McDole
- Artist: Jason Hitchens
- Writer: Adam Foshko
- Composer: Jake Kaufman
- Series: Shrek
- Platform: Nintendo DS
- Release: NA: November 5, 2007
- Mode: Single player

Shrek: Ogres & Dronkeys is a virtual life Nintendo DS video game developed by WayForward Technologies and published by Activision on November 5, 2007.

== Gameplay ==
Players train, play and explore with characters and environments from the Shrek series.

== Critical reception ==
The game has a Metacritic rating of 54% based on 4 critic reviews.

Game Chronicles said "Shrek: Ogres and Dronkeys is not necessarily a terrible game, it is more that it just does nothing to stand out from the crowd of pet simulators that are already saturating the market." Gamezone said "Once all the items are round, there isn't any point to replay the levels. Parents may want to pass on this one." Pocket Gamer UK said "While it doesn't quite measure up to the best of the virtual pet breed, Shrek: Ogres and Dronkeys is an almost satisfying game that younger Shrek fans will enjoy." IGN gave it a rating of 7.0 out of 10.
