= Shrek Forever After (video game) =

2010 video game

- North American Xbox 360 cover art
- Developers: Windows, PS3, X360, Wii; XPEC Entertainment; Nintendo DS; Griptonite iOS, J2ME; Gameloft
- Publisher: Activision
- Composers: David Buckley; Maxime Goulet (Gameloft composer)
- Series: Shrek
- Platforms: Mobile; Microsoft Windows; Nintendo DS; PlayStation 3; Wii; Xbox 360; iOS
- Release: Mobile: WW: May 12, 2010; DS, Windows, PS3, Wii, Xbox 360: NA: May 18, 2010; AU: June 16, 2010; EU: June 18, 2010; iOS: NA: May 21, 2010; EU: July 2, 2010
- Genres: Action-adventure, platform
- Modes: Single-player, multiplayer

Shrek Forever After (also known as Shrek 4, and Shrek Forever After: The Final Chapter) is an action-adventure video game based on the film of the same name. It was released on May 18, 2010, in North America. It is the fourth video game based on the movie series of Shrek. Shrek Forever After was the final game released under Activision’s 2002 licensing agreement with DreamWorks Animation. It is the only Shrek video game available for the PlayStation 3. The Shrek games were removed from digital storefronts on January 1, 2014.

== Gameplay ==
This video game is based on the fourth Shrek movie. Players can play as Shrek, Fiona, Donkey, and Puss in Boots, having support up to four players. They can travel through different worlds and solve puzzles.

== Plot ==
It follows Shrek, who has become a domesticated family man, living happily with Princess Fiona and the triplets. Instead of scaring villagers away like he used to, a reluctant Shrek now agrees to autograph pitch forks. Longing for the days when he felt like a "real ogre", Shrek is tricked into signing a pact with the smooth-talking dealmaker, Rumpelstiltskin. Shrek suddenly finds himself in a twisted, alternate version of Far Far Away, where ogres are now hunted, and because Rumpelstiltskin is king, Shrek and Fiona have never met. Now, it's up to Shrek to undo all of Rumpelstiltskin's mischief in the hopes of saving his friends, restoring his world and reclaiming his one True Love and family.

== Reception ==
Reception

Aggregate scores
Aggregator	Score
GameRankings	(DS) 87% (X360) 65.47% (PS3) 63.75% (Wii) 63.75% (iOS) 55%
Metacritic	(DS) 71/100 (X360) 62/100 (iOS) 60/100 (PS3) 57/100 (Wii) 57/100 (PC) 56/100

Review scores
Publication	Score
IGN	6/10
Official Xbox Magazine (US)	6/10

The game was met with mixed to positive reception. GameRankings and Metacritic gave it a score of 87%, while Metacritic gave it 71 out of 100 for the DS version; 65.47% and 62 out of 100 for the Xbox 360 version; 63.75% and 57 out of 100 for the PlayStation 3 and Wii versions; 55% and 60 out of 100 for the iOS version; and 56 out of 100 for the PC version.

In its August 2010 issue, Official Xbox Magazine commented that the game is "hamstrung by long, dull stretches", and gave it a score of six out of ten.

The game sold 54,000 units in the United States.
