= Shrek SuperSlam =

2005 video game

- Cover art featuring (clockwise from left) Shrek, Puss in Boots, Donkey, and Prince Charming
- Developers: Shaba Games (Note: Windows port developed by LTI Gray Matter); Amaze (GBA/DS)
- Publisher: Activision
- Producer: DreamWorks Animation
- Platforms: PlayStation 2, Xbox, GameCube, Nintendo DS, Windows, Game Boy Advance
- Release: NA: October 25, 2005; EU: November 18, 2005; Windows: NA: November 1, 2005; EU: November 18, 2005
- Genre: Fighting
- Modes: Single-player, multiplayer

Shrek SuperSlam is a 2005 fighting game developed by Shaba Games and published by Activision for the Xbox, PlayStation 2, GameCube, and Microsoft Windows. Based on the Shrek franchise, the game follows up to four players battling in 3D arenas to acquire the most "Slam points" by charging up and successfully hitting opponents with their character's unique "Slam attack". The game features three additional modes, including Slamageddon, where every landed attack gives Slam points, king of the hill, and a story mode, which follows Shrek and his friends as they tell stories to make Donkey's children, the Dronkey's, fall asleep.

== Plot ==
The main plot focuses on Shrek and his friends attempting to help Donkey put the Dronkeys to sleep in order to watch Survivor: Sherwood Forest together at the Dragon's Keep. When one of the Dronkeys inadvertently destroys the family's storybook, the group takes turns creating their own stories. After telling enough stories, the Dronkeys do fall asleep only to be woken up after Shrek yells at the game's announcer for talking too much in the epilogue.

== Gameplay ==
Pinocchio, Prince Charming, Shrek, and Huff N' Puff Wolf fighting on the Gingerbread Hizzle arena. Charming has successfully used their "Slam attack" on Wolf.

Shrek SuperSlam is a 3D arena fighting game in which two to four fighter characters battle in a variety of stages attempting to beat each other up and charge a special move called a "Slam" attack. When a "Slam" is successfully used on other fighters, the player gains points while continually (and creatively) destroying the arena in the process. Whoever gains the most "Slam" points will win when the round is over.

The game features three multiplayer modes: "Melee", "King of the Hill", and "Slammageddon". In Melee, the objective is to earn as many Slam points as possible within two minutes. For every attack landed, a meter that says "Slam" will fill up. Once the meter is full, the player can unleash a Slam attack which can hit multiple opponents. For every opponent hit, the player will receive a Slam point, but if a player get Slammed, they'll lose a point. The player with the most Slam points after the timer runs out wins. In King of the Hill, the objective of the game is to stay atop of a hill the longest, while opponents try and knock each other off. The first player to reach 30 points wins. The longer the player stays on the hill, the more points she/he will receive. In Slammageddon, every single attack counts as a Slam.

Every character's Slam attack has different effects and range. For example, Shrek's "Green Storm" attack will send his opponents flying as he undergoes flatulence at close range, while Robin Hood's "Arrow Swarm" has him commanding his band of Merry Men to litter the battlefield in raining arrows from the sky. Other examples include Pinocchio's "Buzz Bomber" in which his nose grows and he flies across the arena at opponents or Fiona Ogre using "Ogre Aria" to blast her enemies with floating projectile singing notes.

=== Characters ===
The game features 20 playable characters total, with 10 of these needing to be unlocked through gameplay progression. Each character has an array of various costumes/skins to change their appearance. Most of the characters have their own distinct fighting style and moves, with only one or two characters being very similar "clone fighters".

- Anthrax ^{U}
- Black Knight
- Captain Hook ^{U}
- Cyclops ^{U}
- Donkey ^{H}
- Dronkey ^{U}
- Fiona ^{C} ^{H}
- Fiona Ogre ^{C} ^{H}
- Gingerbread Man ^{C} ^{H}
- G-Nome ^{U}
- Huff N' Puff Wolf ^{U}
- Humpty Dumpty ^{U} ^{C}
- Luna (Lil' Witch in GBA/DS versions) ^{U} ^{H}
- Pinocchio ^{C} ^{H}
- Prince Charming ^{H}
- Puss in Boots ^{C} ^{H}
- Quasimodo ^{U}
- Red Riding Hood ^{S}
- Robin Hood ^{U}
- Shrek ^{C} ^{H}
- Thelonious ^{D}
- Ugly Stepsister ^{G}

^U Unlockable characters
^C Characters with alternate costumes
^G Exclusive to GBA and DS versions
^D Exclusive to the DS version
^H Also Playable in the GBA and DS versions
^S Also Playable in the DS version

John Kassir voices the game's announcer. Mongo the Giant Gingerbread Man (voiced by Conrad Vernon) appears as part of a moving stage in the game.

== Reception ==
Reception

Aggregate scores
| Aggregator | Score | | | | | |
| Aggregator | DS | GBA | GameCube | PC | PS2 | Xbox |
|---|---|---|---|---|---|---|
| GameRankings | 59.27% | 52% | 73.54% | 69.89% | 68.81% | 74% |
| Metacritic | 56/100 | 58/100 | 70/100 | 69/100 | 67/100 | 71/100 |

Review scores
| Publication | Score | | | | | |
| Publication | DS | GBA | GameCube | PC | PS2 | Xbox |
|---|---|---|---|---|---|---|
| Eurogamer | N/A | N/A | N/A | N/A | 6/10 | N/A |
| GameSpot | 6.5/10 | N/A | 6.9/10 | 6.6/10 | 6.9/10 | 6.9/10 |
| GameZone | 6.5/10 | N/A | N/A | 7/10 | 7.8/10 | 8.3/10 |
| IGN | 4.5/10 | N/A | 7/10 | N/A | 7/10 | N/A |
| NGC Magazine | 59% | N/A | 65% | N/A | N/A | N/A |
| Official U.S. PlayStation Magazine | N/A | N/A | N/A | N/A | 2.5/5 | N/A |
| Official Xbox Magazine (UK) | N/A | N/A | N/A | N/A | N/A | 7/10 |
| PALGN | N/A | N/A | N/A | N/A | 6/10 | N/A |
| PC Gamer (US) | N/A | N/A | N/A | 66% | N/A | N/A |
| TeamXbox | N/A | N/A | N/A | N/A | N/A | 8.2/10 |
| Next Level Gaming | N/A | 56/100 | 68/100 | 68/100 | 68/100 | 68/100 |

Shrek SuperSlam was met with "mixed or average" reviews. GameRankings and Metacritic gave it a score of 74% and 71 out of 100 for the Xbox version; 74% and 70 out of 100 for the GameCube version; 70% and 69 out of 100 for the PC version; 69% and 67 out of 100 for the PlayStation 2 version; 59% and 56 out of 100 for the DS version; and 52% and 58 out of 100 for the Game Boy Advance version.
