= Shrek's Carnival Craze =

2008 video game

- North American cover art depicting Shrek playing ring toss using snakes
- Developer: Ivolgamus
- Publisher: Activision
- Series: Shrek
- Platforms: Wii, PlayStation 2, Windows, Nintendo DS
- Release: NA: October 28, 2008; EU: November 21, 2008; AU: November 26, 2008
- Genre: Party
- Modes: Single-player, multiplayer

Shrek's Carnival Craze Party Games, also known simply as Shrek's Carnival Craze, is a 2008 licensed party video game developed by Ivolgamus and published by Activision for the Wii, PlayStation 2, Windows, and Nintendo DS. Based on the Shrek franchise, the game's premise follows characters from the series competing in various events at a carnival in an attempt to receive the Carnival Crown.

== Gameplay ==
Shrek's Carnival Craze is a party video game based on the Shrek franchise. It's premise follows the ogre Shrek and his friends, who are invited to a newly opened carnival to try to win the Carnival Crown.

== Development and release ==
The game was developed by Ivolgamus and published by Activision.

It was released for the Wii, PlayStation 2, Windows, and Nintendo DS on October 28, 2008, in North America, and in Australia on November 26, 2008.

== Reception ==
Reception

Review scores
Publication	Score			
Publication	DS	PC	PS2	Wii
AllGame	N/A	N/A	N/A	1.5/5
IGN	3.3/10	N/A	N/A	N/A
Games Aktuell	N/A	5/10	5/10	5/10

Shrek's Carnival Craze was heavily derided by critics. IGN describes it as "absolutely nothing new offered here, and what is offered has been done better many times before. At best boring and at worst unplayable, the included 28 mini-games fail to inspire player enjoyment of any sort."
