= Shrek n' Roll =

2007 video game

- Developer: Backbone Entertainment
- Publisher: Activision
- Series: Shrek
- Platform: Xbox 360
- Release: November 14, 2007
- Genre: Puzzle
- Modes: Single-player, multiplayer

Shrek n' Roll, also known as DreamWorks Shrek-N-Roll, is a video game developed by Backbone Entertainment and published by Activision on November 14, 2007. The puzzle game was released on the Xbox 360.

== Gameplay ==
The gameplay consists of two Shrek characters being positioned at opposite ends of a plank of wood, with a ball-shaped piece of food in the middle. Players must cooperate by manipulating pulleys on their sides to move the plank up a tower, and roll the food to Shrek's ogre babies. Players must avoid letting the ball drop and collect bonus items by rolling the ball over them. The game also offers a versus mode where two players compete to feed an ogre baby at the top of a tower.

== Reception ==
Reception

Aggregate score
Aggregator	Score
Metacritic	49/100

Review scores
Publication	Score
Eurogamer	5/10
IGN	5.5/10
Official Xbox Magazine (US)	5/10
TeamXbox	5.7/10

The game received "generally unfavorable reviews" according to the review aggregation website Metacritic. TeamXbox said, "The gameplay is fun, but not nearly groundbreaking and unlikely to provide hours and hours of entertainment. The graphics are sharp, but nothing that'll put the Xbox 360 at risk of overheating because the processors are working too hard." IGN said, "Shrek-N-Roll is more boredom and mundane than fun and exhilarating, even for diehard fans of all three Shrek films." Eurogamer said, "The gameplay is repetitive - not a problem for puzzle games if they also have an addictive quality, but Shrek-N-Roll just doesn't." Official Xbox Magazine said, "Local co-op play requires constant communication and generates some small excitement, but isn't enough to make Shrek-n-Roll more than an overpriced novelty."
