= Shrek the Third (video game) =

2007 video game

- Developers: Amaze Entertainment (Note: Ported to the PlayStation 2 and Wii by Shaba Games, Microsoft Windows by 7 Studios & Xbox 360 by both Shaba Games and 7 Studios.); Vicarious Visions (GBA, NDS)
- Publisher: Activision
- Composer: Winifred Phillips
- Series: Shrek
- Platforms: Microsoft Windows, Wii, Xbox 360, PlayStation 2, PlayStation Portable; Game Boy Advance; Nintendo DS; Java
- Release: Game Boy Advance, Microsoft Windows, Nintendo DS, Wii, Xbox 360: NA: May 15, 2007; AU: June 6, 2007; EU: June 22, 2007; PlayStation 2: NA: May 15, 2007; AU: June 6, 2007; EU: June 28, 2007; Java; June 1, 2007; PlayStation Portable: NA: June 5, 2007; AU: June 6, 2007; EU: July 20, 2007
- Genres: Action-adventure, platform
- Modes: Single-player, multiplayer

Shrek the Third is an action-adventure video game based on the 2007 DreamWorks Animation animated film of the same name, developed by Amaze Entertainment, 7 Studios, Shaba Games and Vicarious Visions. The game was published by Activision in May 2007, for Game Boy Advance, Microsoft Windows, Nintendo DS, Wii, Xbox 360, PlayStation 2 and PlayStation Portable.

The soundtrack was composed by Winifred Phillips and produced by Winnie Waldron, with additional music by Geoff Zanelli. It was the last DreamWorks Animation game released for the Game Boy Advance.

== Gameplay ==
The storyline of Shrek the Third is based on the film. Shrek has to find Artie to have him serve as King of Far Far Away, while Prince Charming attempts to storm the city, and take the throne by force. Players can play as main characters from the film, including Shrek, Donkey, Puss in Boots, Princess Fiona, Fiona's cousin Arthur, and Sleeping Beauty. The game consists of 20 levels, some of which branch off from the main story of the movie, and features both single-player, and multiplayer play. These features vary based on the console.

=== Story mode ===
The game's general interface (PS2 version) for the story mode in one of the early levels

There are 6 characters the player can play as, all 5 of the movies' main characters, Shrek, Donkey, Puss in Boots, Arthur, Fiona, and one of the supporting characters, Sleeping Beauty. Puss in Boots is the only character that can double jump. The Gingerbread Man, King Harold, and Pinocchio are voiced by their movie actors.

There are 20 levels in Shrek the Third. The levels are highly linear, with side paths containing rewards for the completion of mission-style quests (three or five) and easter eggs such as an appearance by the (Penguins) from the Madagascar film. After completing a level, the player is awarded bonus Far Far Pounds, the game's currency used for purchasing items in the gift shop. The difficulty setting multiplies the bonuses obtained.

There are numerous boxes, barrels, and other smashables scattered around the levels. Most contain fairy dust for use in special attacks, but a few contain coins and food. Coins are of either gold or red colors (called Far Far Pounds). In addition to the aforementioned smashables, a source of Far Far Pounds can often be just finding them scattered around, as well as under certain circumstances, enemies. Gold coins are worth 3 pounds and red coins are worth 10 pounds. The player has to fight with fists and swords against multiple enemies, like pirates, guards, athletes, evil trees, and witches, depending on the level the player is in. After an enemy has sustained several hits, a finishing move can be used on them, which, when activated, plays an animation of the currently selected character finishing off the enemy, defeating them instantly, as well as causing them to drop special purple fairy dust. Felled enemies will drop fairy dust that will fill up the three-part special attack meter.

=== Minigames ===
There are 6 minigames in Shrek the Third. Playing them does not affect the main game (that is, no bonus Far Far Pounds are awarded). By obtaining a high enough score after each game (the amount varies depending on the game), three different medals are awarded; bronze, silver and gold (in order from lowest to highest).

== Reception ==
Reception

Aggregate score
Aggregator	Score
Metacritic	(DS) 70/100 (PC) 60/100 (PSP) 57/100 (GBA) 57/100 (Wii) 57/100 (X360) 56/100 (PS2) 56/100

Review scores
Publication	Score
1Up.com	(DS) C+ (X360) D−
Eurogamer	5/10
Game Informer	5.25/10
GameRevolution	C−
GameSpot	(DS) 6.8/10; 5.2/10 (X360 & GBA) 5/10
GameZone	(PC) 7/10 (X360) 6.9/10 (GBA) 6.7/10 (Wii) 6.5/10 (PSP) 6/10
IGN	(DS) 7/10; 6/10
Nintendo Power	7/10
Official Xbox Magazine (US)	6/10
PC Gamer (UK)	48%
The A.V. Club	C+

Shrek the Third received mixed reviews from critics.

The game shipped 2 million copies.
