= Feint (disambiguation) =

A feint is a manoeuvre designed to distract or mislead, particularly in swordsmanship, warfare and combat sports.

Feint may also refer to:

- "Feint" (song), by Epica (2003)
- Feint-ruled paper
- Adrian Feint (1894-1971), Australian artist
- Feint (DJ), British DJ and electronic music producer known for releasing drum and bass records.

== See also ==
- Aurora Feint, a video game series
- Faint (disambiguation)
- OpenFeint, a social platform for mobile games
