= Shariki =

1994 video game

- Game screen. The Russian счет (sčot) means "score," while the green text at the bottom translates as "Program "Shariki". Author Zhenya Alemzhin. Write letters: sandra@sandra.kemerovo.ru. Hello everyone!"
- Developer: Eugene "Zhenya" Alemzhin
- Platforms: MS-DOS, Windows
- Release: 1994
- Genre: Puzzle
- Mode: Single-player

Shariki (Russian: Ша́рики, "The Marbles") is a puzzle video game written in 1994 for MS-DOS by Russian developer Eugene Alemzhin. The goal of the game is to gain progressively higher scores by matching three or more balls of the same color in a line (vertical or horizontal), by swapping adjacent balls. Each swap must result in a match. Matched balls are then removed, and new ones drop from the top to fill the gaps. The game is over when no more matches are possible in the game field.

== Legacy ==
Shariki proved to be influential and eventually many games that closely matched its mechanics arose. Collectively known as tile-matching video games or match-three games, these all revolve around the mechanic of creating a three-in-a-row line of identical pieces. They include:

- Bejeweled (2001) by PopCap Games
- Jewel Quest (2004) created and published by iWin
- Puzzle Quest: Challenge of the Warlords (2007) developed by Infinite Interactive and published by D3 Publisher
- Aurora Feint (2008) game for the iPhone and iPod Touch
- Candy Crush Saga (2012)
- Pokémon Shuffle (2015) game for the Nintendo 3DS handheld console
