= Jason Citron =

American businessman and entrepreneur (born 1984)

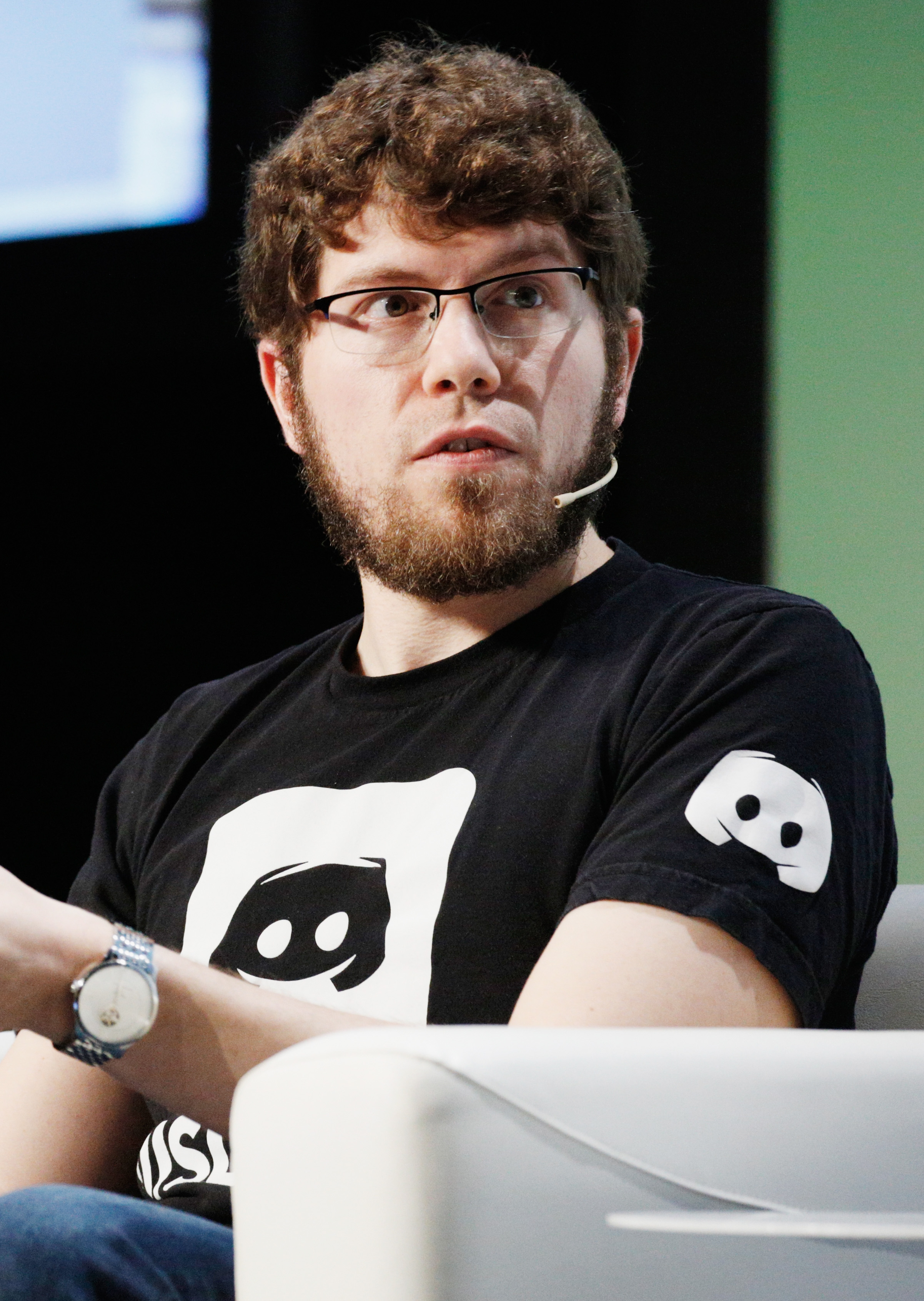
- Citron at TechCrunch Disrupt in 2018
- Born: September 21, 1984 (age 42); San Francisco, California, U.S.
- Education: Full Sail University (BS)
- Occupations: Businessman; Entrepreneur
- Years active: 2008–present
- Known for: Co-founding Discord and founding OpenFeint

Jason Citron (born September 21, 1984) is an American businessman and entrepreneur best known as the co-founder and former chief executive officer of the social communication platform Discord. He is also the founder of OpenFeint, one of the earliest major social gaming networks for mobile devices.

== Early life and education ==
Jason Citron was born on September 21, 1984, in San Francisco, California, to a family with a background in business and technology, later growing up in South Florida. He became interested in technology after being gifted a computer by his grandfather, as well as his love of video games, citing Final Fantasy VI as his favorite game and that "I was a Squaresoft fanboy, and I still am." He learned how to write code in QBasic at the age of 13 with the help of a friend, with his first program being a text-based role-playing game. He later attended Full Sail University in Winter Park, Florida, graduating with a Bachelor of Science in Game Design and Development in 2004. He was inducted into the Full Sail University Hall of Fame in March 2025.

== Career ==
=== OpenFeint ===
In 2009, Citron founded OpenFeint, a social gaming platform for mobile games that allowed players to connect through achievements, leaderboards, messaging features, and multiplayer integration. The service grew rapidly during the rise of the iPhone and the App Store, eventually becoming one of the largest mobile gaming networks in the world, with tens of millions of users and support across thousands of games.

In 2011, OpenFeint was acquired by Japanese media and gaming company GREE for approximately $104 million. Following the acquisition, Citron briefly remained involved with the company before departing to pursue new projects in online gaming and communication technology.

=== Discord ===
After leaving OpenFeint, Citron co-founded the game development studio Hammer & Chisel. The company initially focused on creating multiplayer online games, including the multiplayer online battle arena game Fates Forever, which was released in 2014. During development, the team became dissatisfied with existing voice and text communication software available to gamers, citing problems with usability, latency, and reliability. Over the course of development, the company created an internal communication platform that later evolved into Discord, which launched publicly in 2015. Under Citron's leadership, Discord expanded beyond gaming communities and became a widely used online communication platform.

Under Citron's leadership, Discord expanded far beyond gaming and became widely used by students, hobbyist groups, creators, businesses, developers, and online communities. The platform experienced especially rapid growth during the late 2010s and early 2020s, becoming one of the largest communication platforms on the internet. Discord also introduced features including livestreaming, forum channels, subscription communities, application integrations, and developer tools.

Citron frequently emphasized building Discord as a platform focused on private communities and social interaction rather than algorithm-driven public social media feeds. He also oversaw the company's moderation, trust and safety, and monetization initiatives as the platform continued to expand globally.

=== Stepping down from Discord (April 2025) ===
Citron announced in April 2025 that he was stepping down as Discord's CEO but will remain on the board of directors. He was succeeded as CEO by Humam Sakhnini, who was the former president of Activision Blizzard and King.
