= Rhythm (disambiguation) =

Rhythm is the variation of the length and accentuation of a series of sounds or other events.

Rhythm or The Rhythm may also refer to:

== Film and television ==
- Rhythm (2000 film), a Tamil-language musical drama film
- Rhythm (2010 film), a Malayalam-language film of 2010
- Rhythm (2016 film), a Hindi-language romance musical film
- Rhythm, a 2023 Japanese television series starring Keito Okamoto
- Rhythm, an upcoming film Kannada-language musical drama film

== Music ==
- Rhythm (music magazine), a magazine about drumming
- The Rhythm (radio show), now Classic Hip-Hop, an American syndicated music format

=== Albums ===
- Rhythm (album), by Wildbirds & Peacedrums, 2014
- Rhythm, by Luke Vibert, 2008

=== Songs ===
- "Rhythm" (song), by Ua, 1996
- "The Rhythm", by MNEK, 2015
- "Rhythm", by Envy from The Fallen Crimson, 2020
- "Rhythm", by Praga Khan from Falling, 2000
- "Rhythm", by Sum 41 from All Killer No Filler, 2001
- "Rhythm", from the Blue's Big Musical Movie soundtrack, 2000
- "The Rhythm", by Mari Wilson, 1991
- "The Rhythm", by Spoons from Talkback, 1983
- "The Rhythm", by XTC from Go 2, 1978

== Other ==
- Rythm (Software)
- Rhythm (horse) (1987–2007), an American Thoroughbred racehorse
- Rhythm (linguistics) or isochrony
- Rhythm (liqueur), a citrus flavoured liqueur
- Rhythm (literary magazine), an early 20th-century British magazine
- Rhythm (motor boat), a boat designed by LOMOcean Design
- Rhythm Watch, a Japanese watch company.

== See also ==
- Ritmo (disambiguation)
- Rythem, a Japanese pop duo
