= Mikey Hooks =

2013 video game

- Developer: BeaverTap Games
- Publisher: Noodlecake Studios (Android)
- Platforms: iOS, Android
- Release: August 8, 2013

Mikey Hooks is an iOS game by BeaverTap Games, and released on August 8, 2013. It is part of the Mikey series of games, which includes Mikey Boots and Mikey Shorts.

== Critical reception ==
Reception

Aggregate score
Aggregator	Score
Metacritic	88/100

Review score
Publication	Score
TouchArcade	5/5

The game has a rating of 88/100 on Metacritic based on 16 critic reviews.

Apple'N'Apps wrote "Mikey Hooks latches on to you, and won't let go as you keep swinging through an expertly crafted game that is one of the best on iOS making it an absolute must buy." 148Apps said "Mikey Hooks takes the casual speedrun formula of Mikey Shorts, and adds grappling hooks for more addictive speedrun fun. Speedfun!" AppleSmile wrote "Retaining the same style and spot-on controls as the original, Mikey Hooks adds grappling hooks, more obstacles, and a damage mechanic that adds a great deal of challenge and makes the sequel a standout hit." Slide To Play wrote "You'll play every level over and over again to get those three stars, and after your friends manage to beat your scores, you'll play the levels again. It's just that much fun." TouchArcade said "It fires on all cylinders, and if you're a fan of the previous games you don't even need this review to determine if you should get it or not–you probably have already bought it."

Gamezebo wrote "Mikey Hooks' only real hiccup is that the controls aren't perfect. I know, I know, I said that they are some of the best platforming controls I've had the pleasure to play on a touch-screen - but they're still not spot-on. The sliding in particular feels irksome at times, especially on the later levels which require far more precision thanks to the plethora of spikes and traps scattered about the place." Modojo said "Mikey Shorts did a lot for the platforming market last year, and for just under two bucks, Mikey Hooks does even better with a new mode, a great new gameplay tactic and that same wonderful presentation from the original. One play and you'll be, ahem, hooked." AppSpy wrote "Despite the new hookshot mechanic, Mikey Hooks feels very familiar to its predecessor. However, when your predecessor was one of the best platformers on iOS, that not necessarily a bad thing."

Multiplayer.it said "Mikey Hooks delivers the same gameplay from its predecessor, but adds a new layer to the experience thanks to the grappling hook." IGN Italia wrote "Mikey Hooks is a really good game, based on a solid gameplay and a really precise control system. It could instead have been a great game, but it's too short and easy, and even if the Race Mode adds some fun, it's simply not enough to make the final step to greatness." MacLife said "Mikey Hooks is a worthwhile successor to Mikey Shorts that's short, but a rush while it lasts." Arcade Sushi wrote "Like its predecessor, Mikey Hooks is a solid title that's full of lots of fun platforming action. For the price, it's certainly worth adding to your library if you are looking for some fast-paced fun. And most importantly, it does right by the grappling hook." Pocket Gamer said "A brilliant mix of precision and fun, Mikey Hooks is a worthy sequel to its illustrious forebear."

3D Juegos wrote "Mikey Hooks is a brilliant sequel to one of the most addictive and beloved 2D platformers found in the iOS market, Mikey Shorts." Destructoid wrote "Despite having a virtual d-pad and buttons, Mikey Hooks is a great addition to any platformer fan's portable library. Although I don't think it surpasses Hook Champ as an absolute must-buy, it's a really fun game in its own right, and a perfect example of a serviceable platform game on iOS."
