= Super QuickHook =

2010 video game

- Cover art showing some of the game's characters swinging using grappling hooks
- Developer: Rocketcat Games
- Publishers: Rocketcat Games, Noodlecake Studios (Android)
- Designer: Kepa Auwae
- Programmer: Jeremy Orlando
- Artist: Brandon Rhodes
- Composers: Andrea Chang (Note: Through production music); Cecill Etheredge
- Series: Hook Champ
- Platforms: iOS; Android
- Release: iOS; June 17, 2010; October 25, 2019 (GameClub); Android; July 23, 2015
- Genre: 2D platformer
- Modes: Single-player, multiplayer

Super QuickHook is a 2010 2D platform game developed and published by Rocketcat Games for mobile devices. It was released on June 17, 2010, for iOS devices, with a port for Android releasing later on July 23, 2015. The game is a spiritual successor to 2009's Hook Champ, and follows its playing characters traversing two-dimensional levels, primarily using a grappling hook.

The game was developed by a team of three people: Kepa Auwae, Jeremy Orlando, and Brandon Rhodes. Auwae designed the game, Orlando was the lead programmer, and Rhodes was the lead artist. Super QuickHook received "universal acclaim" from critics. Critics praised QuickHook's grappling hook mechanic, with Slide to Play stating that it makes the game a "blast to play".

== Gameplay ==
One of the game's playable characters, Jakob, swinging across a cave using a grappling hook

Super QuickHook is a 2D platformer where players play as one of 6 different characters as they traverse terrain and levels using a grappling hook, which is used by touching the screen. The player also has a pair of rocket boots, which can propel the player forward when used, in addition to Slick-pants, which allows players to slide. The game is divided into four modes: story, avalanche, eruption, and duel. In the story mode, players attempt to clear 22 different levels, which are scattered with coins and hidden areas. Later levels introduce other obstacles and mechanics, such as spikes that the grappling hook can't grapple onto. The avalanche mode is a high score-based endless runner where the player attempts to escape an incoming avalanche. The eruption mode is alike the avalanche mode, with the only noted differences being its higher difficulty and that the player has to avoid a volcano eruption, rather than an avalanche. The levels in the avalanche and eruption modes are randomly-generated and, like the story mode, also feature coins. In the duel mode, players battle others in the avalanche mode, with the person lasting the longest being the winner.

After clearing a level, players receive store credit, the amount of which is dependent on the time it took the player to beat the level and the number of coins collected. The game's original iOS release featured integration with the social media platform OpenFeint, which allowed players to record their playthroughs and to race ghosts of other people's records. The developers also published their ghosts, some of which players are required to beat to access certain levels.

In the in-game shop, players can spend the store credit they've earned in the different modes to upgrade their items and to buy hats that can be worn by the player character. Players can also optionally converse with visitors of the shop. Following a July 2010 update, the game featured achievements, which awarded players that performed specific actions or goals in the game. Unlike Hook Champ, which was 8-bit, Super QuickHook had a 16-bit-style.

== Development and release ==
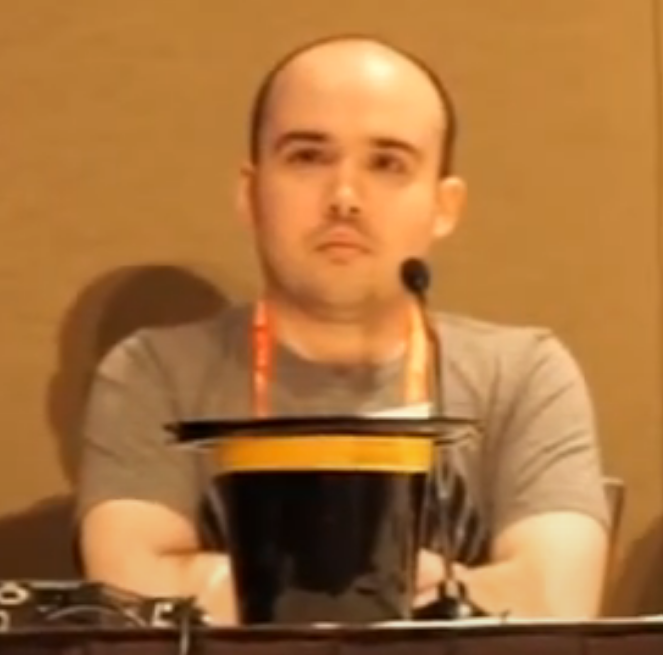
Designer Kepa Auwae at PAX Prime 2015

Super QuickHook was developed by the American company Rocketcat Games, consisting of Kepa Auwae, Jeremy Orlando, and Brandon Rhodes, and was their second major mobile title. Auwae designed the game, Orlando programmed it, and Rhodes took the role of the lead artist. The game used production music by Andrea Chang and Cecill Etheredge.

During early development, Super QuickHook was internally referred to as "Avalanche Game", which was due to the game's avalanche mode. In a podcast with TouchArcade, designer Kepa Auwae described the game's development as "building on the fun" Rocketcat Games had when playing the 2009 endless runner title, Canabalt. The game's level design is based on a "classic principle" invented by Nintendo; it first shows a mechanic in a simple context and then proceeds to use it in more difficult and challenging scenarios.

Leading up to the game's launch, Rocketcat Games posted gameplay screenshots and trailers for the game. In early June 2010, Rocketcat Games submitted Super QuickHook to Apple for release on the App Store. The submission was accepted, and the game released on iPhone and iPad on June 17, 2010. Following the game's launch, multiple updates were released, which added new content to the game. An Android port was released on July 23, 2015. Super QuickHook was removed from the App Store following the iOS 11 update, which removed all 32-bit applications from iOS devices; however, the game was re-released by GameClub on the same platform as a part of their service on October 25, 2019.

== Reception ==
Reception

Aggregate score
Aggregator	Score
Metacritic	96/100 (Note: Based on 9 reviews)

Review scores
Publication	Score
GamePro	5/5
Gamezebo	4.5/5
GameZone	9/10
Pocket Gamer	4/5
TouchArcade	4.5/5
AppSpy	5/5
Multiplayer.it	8.8/10

Super QuickHook received "universal acclaim", according to review aggregator Metacritic. Critics directed praise at the game's grappling hook feature, with Tracy Erickson of Pocket Gamer calling it "equally [as] fun" as the first film in the American media series Indiana Jones, Raiders of the Lost Ark, which has been described by critics as one of the most "deliriously funny, ingenious[,] and stylish" American adventure films made. Super QuickHook was the highest-rated mobile game on Metacritic in 2010.

Super QuickHook was seen as an improvement from its predecessor, Hook Champ. Critics were happy that Toothy, who chased players down in Hook Champ, had been removed from the game, as it allowed players to explore levels "at [their] own pace".

The game's levels were praised by critics; Jared Nelson of TouchArcade praised the details contained within them, citing how flocks of birds sometimes fly out of trees when players get nearby. Andrew Nesvadba of AppSpy praised the secrets and collectibles in the levels, as they awarded players who chose to explore. Erickson criticized the difficulty of unlocking later levels in the game, stating that "the bar [was] set unnecessarily high".

The game's avalanche mode was also praised by critics; Multiplayer.it's Andrea Palmisano called it "pleasant" and also said that it was a good way to earn store credit. Eurogamer contributor Rich Stanton cited the mode for being where the grappling hook mechanic is at its "purest".

The game's integration with OpenFeint was praised by Erickson, calling it "phenomenal". Joe Martin of bit-tech stated that the avalanche mode is a "real challenge" for veterans of Hook Champ and was happy that experienced players could compare scores through the integration.

== Sequel ==
In December 2010, Rocketcat Games released a sequel to Super QuickHook, titled Hook Worlds. (Note: Also known as Hook Swing Worlds) The sequel is a collection of 4 endless runner games, but with Super QuickHook's grappling hook mechanic. According to Metacritic, the game received "generally favorably reviews."
