= Humam Sakhnini =

Palestinian American business executive (born 1968)

- Born: 1968 (age 57–58)
- Education: University of Western Ontario (BA); Queen's University (MA); Yale School of Management (MBA)
- Occupation: Business executive
- Employer: Discord
- Known for: Chief executive of Discord; former president of King Digital Entertainment
- Title: Chief Executive Officer
- Term: 2025–present

Humam Sakhnini (born September 1968) is a Palestinian-American management consultant, financial technology entrepreneur, and technology and video game industry executive, who has served as the chief executive officer of Discord since April 2025. He was previously a partner at McKinsey & Company, and held senior roles at Activision Blizzard and its subsidiary King Digital Entertainment, including president of King and, later, vice chairman at Activision Blizzard.

== Biography ==
=== Early life and education ===
Sakhnini was born in Damascus, Syria and spent a part of his teenage years in Lebanon during the Lebanese Civil War.

He graduated with a Bachelor of Arts (BA) in economics from the University of Western Ontario in Canada before receiving a Master of Arts (MA) in economics from Queen's University at Kingston in 1992. He earned a Master of Business Administration (MBA) degree, with a concentration in strategy and finance, from the Yale School of Management in 2001.

=== Early career ===
Sakhnini initially worked for the investment bank Nesbitt Burns and for the Department of Finance Canada. He participated in the 28th Annual Meeting of the Canadian Economics Association in Calgary in June 1994, and authored three of Department of Finance's Fiscal Policy and Economic Analysis Branch working papers in 1995. In one of these papers, written jointly with Steven James and Chris Matier, he argued in favor of pre-funded pension plans for the baby boomer generation as a source of investment and economic growth, siding with the World Bank in the debate over the future of the Canada Pension Plan.

He later founded and co-directed the financial technology firm ISGroup, which provided services to mutual funds and hedge funds.

In the 2000s, he spent eight years as a partner (or associate principal) at McKinsey & Company advising executives at media and technology companies on business strategy, including acquisitions, international growth and market entry, as well as marketing, sales, and organizational transformation.

=== Activision Blizzard ===
He joined Activision Blizzard in July 2009 as executive vice president for corporate strategy and business development, and in February 2012 became the company's chief strategy and talent officer. In that capacity he led several growth and corporate-development initiatives, including Activision Blizzard's $5.9 billion acquisition of King in 2016.

Sakhnini joined the London-based King in April 2016 as chief financial officer and chief strategy officer after leading its acquisition by Activision Blizzard. In January 2019, he was appointed president of the company, taking over operational management of King's mobile game portfolio (which included Candy Crush Saga) in partnership with co-founder and chief executive Riccardo Zacconi. Zacconi announced his departure as chief executive in May 2019 and formally left the role on 1 July 2019, after which Sakhnini effectively ran the company; co-founder Sebastian Knutsson, in a farewell post in August 2020 marking Zacconi's exit as chairman, credited "Humam Sakhnini who is now running King".

As president, Sakhnini oversaw a partnership between King and other game developers and the World Health Organization in 2020 on the "Play Apart Together" public-health campaign, which carried public-health guidance through in-game messaging during the COVID-19 pandemic and reached around a quarter of a billion monthly active users. In November 2020 he announced King's plans for a Crash Bandicoot mobile title leveraging Activision Blizzard intellectual property, telling CNBC that "the world is going to take note when we bring this to market"; Crash Bandicoot: On the Run! was launched on 25 March 2021.

In February 2022, King announced that chief development officer Tjodolf Sommestad would succeed Sakhnini as president and that Sakhnini would, after six years at King and twelve years at Activision Blizzard, return to the United States with his family. The company reported that King had achieved more than $1 billion in annual operating income in 2021 under his leadership, with King's overall revenue reaching $2.58 billion that year. Activision Blizzard chief executive Bobby Kotick said in the company's announcement that he had "greatly valued" his twelve-year partnership with Sakhnini and that Sakhnini had been "instrumental" in both the King and Blizzard acquisitions. Sakhnini subsequently helped Kotick oversee Activision Blizzard at the time of its acquisition by Microsoft and continued as vice chairman until December 2023, leaving the company not long after the acquisition closed in October 2023.

=== Discord ===
On 23 April 2025, Discord announced that Sakhnini would become chief executive officer as co-founder Jason Citron transitioned to a board role and CEO advisor; Sakhnini also joined the company's board of directors. The company stated that the leadership change would help it scale and prepare for future opportunities, including, by Citron's account, eventually "becoming a public company". Discord said the transition would take effect on 28 April 2025. Technology outlets including Bloomberg News and TechCrunch reported the appointment, noting Sakhnini's prior roles at Activision Blizzard and King. Citron simultaneously published a message to employees about "passing the torch", saying that, after building Discord's leadership team and strategy, he had "literally hired [him]self out of a job".

In an interview with VentureBeat published the same day, Sakhnini described Discord as a platform with "an undeniable product-market fit where hundreds of millions of people connect around their passion for gaming and shared interests" and said that, on a possible initial public offering, the company would "pick our shot" when "the right time comes" rather than solving for a specific timeline. Discord, which had laid off about 17% of its workforce in early 2024 under Citron amid a refocus on its gaming roots, reported at the time of Sakhnini's appointment that it had over 200 million monthly active users spending some two billion hours per month playing games on its platform, and roughly 800 employees. Board member Mitch Lasky said in the company's announcement that he had long admired Sakhnini's "strategic thinking" and considered him "the ideal leader for this new phase of Discord's history", citing in particular his understanding of "customer acquisition and modern revenue creation".

In September 2025, in the wake of the killing of Charlie Kirk, Sakhnini was the recipient of two separate congressional inquiries asking him to engage with hearings on online radicalisation. On 17 September 2025, House Oversight and Government Reform chairman James Comer sent letters to the chief executives of Discord, Reddit, Twitch and Valve requesting their testimony at a 8 October 2025 hearing on "the radicalization of online forum users", citing Discord communications associated with the suspect in Kirk's death. Five days later, on 22 September 2025, Sakhnini was sent a separate letter from the United States House Committee on Homeland Security requesting documents and information for its investigation into how online platforms could be used to "facilitate radicalization, disseminate extremist content, and aid in individuals' planning efforts to conduct violent attacks". Discord publicly stated that it welcomed the opportunity to testify and would "continuously engage with policymakers on these critical issues"; the Oversight Committee's hearing was subsequently delayed beyond its original 8 October date amid the federal government shutdown.

=== Other activities ===
Sakhnini sits on the Board of Advisors of the Yale School of Management's Center for Customer Insights, an industry-academic body that, in the Center's words, comprises "leaders from customer-facing organizations in a wide range of sectors" and provides the Center with "leadership and foresight to advance its mission and purpose".
