= Puzzle video game =

Video game genre

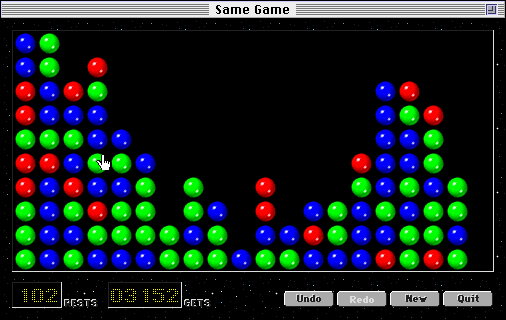
A 1994 Mac version of the 1985 tile-matching puzzle video game Chain Shot!

Puzzle video games make up a broad genre of video games that emphasize puzzle solving. The types of puzzles can test problem-solving skills, including logic, pattern recognition, sequence solving, spatial recognition, and word completion. Many puzzle games involve a real-time element and require quick thinking, such as Tetris (1985) and Lemmings (1991).

== History ==
Puzzle video games owe their origins to brain teasers and puzzles throughout human history. The mathematical strategy game Nim, and other traditional thinking games such as Hangman and Bulls and Cows (commercialized as Mastermind), were popular targets for computer implementation.

In Universal Entertainment's Space Panic, released in arcades in 1980, the player digs holes in platforms to trap creatures. It is a precursor to puzzle-platform games such as Lode Runner (1983), Door Door (1983), and Doki Doki Penguin Land (1985).

Blockbuster, by Alan Griesemer and Stephen Bradshaw (Atari 8-bit, 1981), is a computerized version of the Rubik's Cube puzzle. Snark Hunt (Atari 8-bit, 1982) is a single-player game of logical deduction, a clone of the 1970s Black Box board game.

Elements of Konami's tile-sliding Guttang Gottong (1982) were later seen in Pipe Mania from LucasArts (1989).

In Boulder Dash (1984), the goal is to collect diamonds while avoiding or exploiting rocks that fall after digging out the dirt beneath them.

Chain Shot! (1985) introduced removing groups of the same color tiles on a grid, causing the remaining tiles to fall into the gap. Uncle Henry's Nuclear Waste Dump (1986) involves dropping colored shapes into a pit, but the goal is to keep the same color tiles from touching.

Tetris (1985) revolutionized and popularized the puzzle game genre. The game was created by Soviet game designer Alexey Pajitnov for the Electronika 60. Pajitnov was inspired by a traditional puzzle game named Pentominos in which players arrange blocks into lines without any gaps. The game was released by Spectrum Holobyte for MS-DOS in 1987, Atari Games in arcades in 1988, and sold 30 million copies for Game Boy.

In Lemmings (1991), a series of creatures walk into deadly situations, and a player assigns jobs to specific lemmings to guide the swarm to a safe destination.

The 1994 MS-DOS game Shariki, by Eugene Alemzhin, introduced the mechanic of swapping adjacent elements to tile matching games. It was little known at the time, but later had a major influence on the genre.

Interest in Mahjong video games from Japan began to grow in 1994.

=== Modern puzzle games ===
In 2000, PopCap Games released Bejeweled, a direct clone of the 1994 tile-matching game Shariki with improved visuals. It sparked interest in the match-three mechanic which became the foundation for other popular games, including Puzzle Quest: Challenge of the Warlords (2007), Candy Crush Saga (2012), and Puzzle & Dragons (2012).

After the release of Portal in 2007, there has been a rise in popularity of physics-based logic puzzle games.

== Sub-genres ==
=== Physics game ===
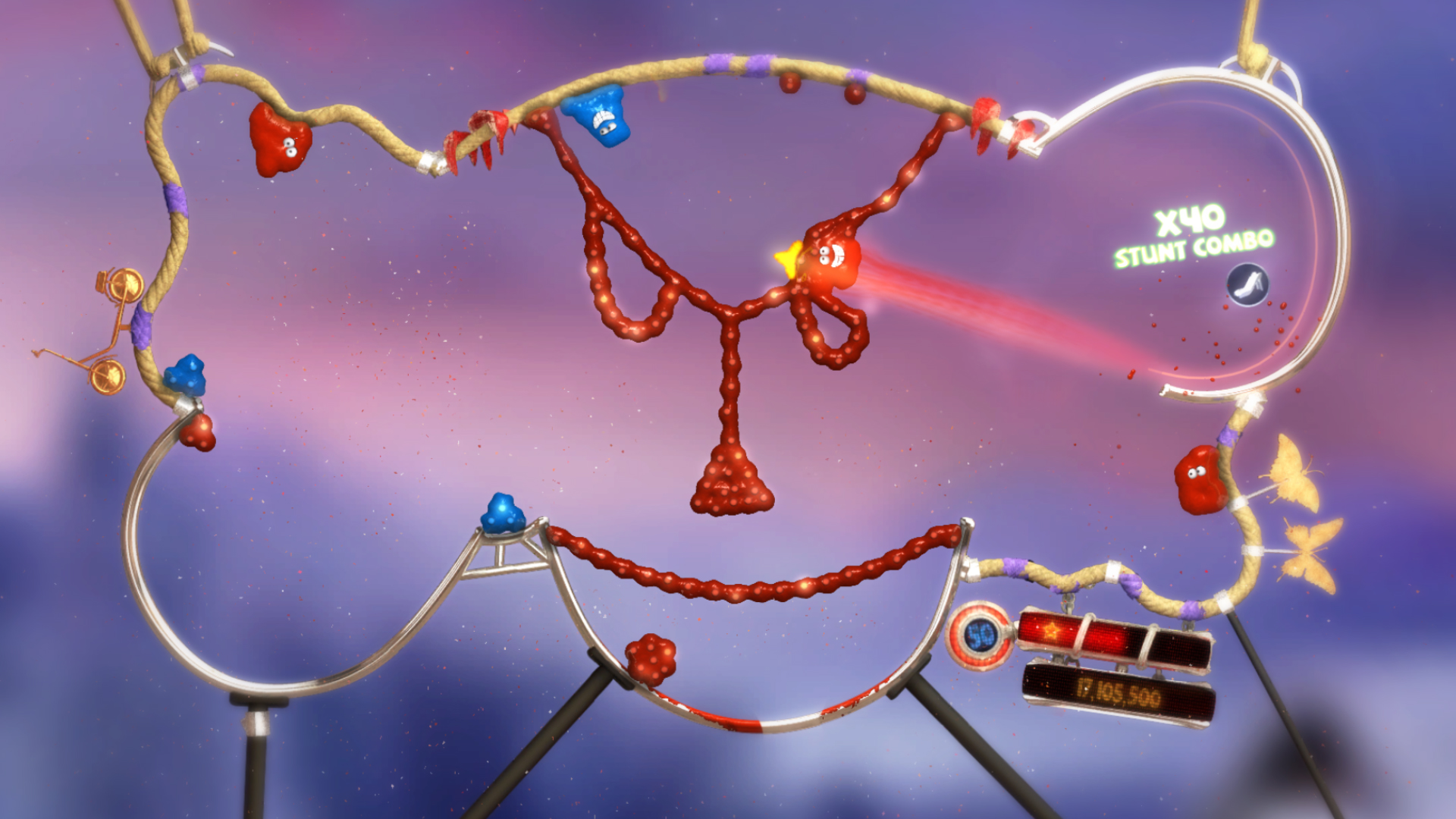
The Splatters, a physics-based Xbox Live Arcade game

A physics game is a type of logical puzzle video game wherein the player must use the game's physics and environment to complete each puzzle. Physics games use consistent physics to make games more challenging. The genre is popular in online flash games and mobile games. Educators have used these games to demonstrate principles of physics.

Physics-based logic puzzle games include The Incredible Machine, Portal, The Talos Principle, Braid, Fez, World of Goo, and Cut the Rope, as well as projectile collision games such as Angry Birds, Peggle, Monster Strike, and Crush the Castle.

=== Programming game ===
Programming games require writing code, either as text or using a visual system, to solve puzzles. Examples include Rocky's Boots (1982), Robot Odyssey (1984), SpaceChem (2011), and Infinifactory (2015).

=== Exploration ===
This sub-genre includes point-and-click games that often overlap with adventure games and walking simulators. Unlike logical puzzle games, these games generally require inductive reasoning to solve. The defining trait is that the player must experiment with mechanisms in each level before they can solve them. Exploration games include Myst, Limbo, and The Dig. Escape room games such as The Room involve detailed exploration of a single location.

=== Sokoban ===
Sokoban games, such as its 1982 namesake title, or block-pushing games, involve pushing or pulling blocks on a grid-like space to move them into designated positions without blocking the movement of other blocks. Similar games include Baba is You and Patrick's Parabox.

=== Hidden object game ===
A hidden object game, sometimes called hidden picture or hidden object puzzle adventure (HOPA), is a genre of puzzle video game in which the player must find items from a list that are hidden within a scene. Hidden object games are a popular trend in casual gaming.

=== Tile-matching ===
In tile-matching video games, the player manipulates tiles in order to make them disappear according to a matching criterion. The genre began with 1985's Chain Shot! and has similarities to falling-block games such as Tetris. This genre includes games that require pieces to be swapped such as Bejeweled or Candy Crush Saga, games that adapt the classic tile-based game Mahjong such as Mahjong Trails, and games in which pieces are shot on the board such as Zuma. Puzzle games based on Tetris include tile-matching games where the matching criterion is to place a given number of tiles of the same type so that they adjoin each other. That number is often three, and the corresponding subset of tile-matching games is referred to as match-three games.

== See also ==
- List of puzzle video games
