= Discord =

American online communication software

- Logo used since 2021

- Screenshot Screenshot depicting Discord's home screen in 2026
- Developer: Discord Inc. (Note: Formerly known as Hammer & Chisel, Inc.)
- Release: May 13, 2015; 11 years ago

Stable release(s) [±]
- Windows: 1.0.9268 / November 13, 2026; 5 days ago
- Android: 353.11 / November 6, 2026; 12 days ago
- iOS (Note: Including iPadOS and visionOS): 353.0 / November 9, 2026; 9 days ago
- Written in: Client: TypeScript (with React); Server: Elixir, Python, Rust, C++
- Engine: Web client: Electron; Mobile client: React Native; Server: Bespoke, purpose-built
- Operating system: Windows 10, 11; macOS 11+; Linux; Android 7+; iOS 16+ (Note: Including iPadOS); visionOS 1+; web browsers
- Available in: 31 languages
- List of languages English (UK/US), Bulgarian, Chinese (Simplified/Traditional), Croatian, Czech, Danish, Dutch, Finnish, French, German, Greek, Hindi, Hungarian, Italian, Japanese, Korean, Lithuanian, Norwegian (Bokmål), Polish, Portuguese (Brazil), Romanian, Russian, Spanish (Spain/LATAM), Swedish, Thai, Turkish, Ukrainian, and Vietnamese
- Type: VoIP communications, instant messaging, videoconferences, content delivery, and social media
- License: Proprietary
- Website: discord.com
- Repository: github.com/discord

Discord Inc.
- Website type: Private
- Founded: May 2015; 11 years ago
- Headquarters: San Francisco, California, United States
- Area served: Worldwide
- Founders: Jason Citron; Stanislav Vishnevskiy
- CEO: Humam Sakhnini
- Industry: Software
- Employees: 501 (2025)
- Website: discord.com

Discord is an American instant messaging and VoIP social platform that allows communication through voice calls, video calls, text messaging, and media. Communication can be private or in virtual communities called "servers". (Note: The developer documentation calls the servers "guilds". These "server" communities are not the web servers that implement Discord.) A server is a collection of persistent chat rooms (called "channels") and voice channels accessed by invitation links. Discord runs on Windows, macOS, Android, iOS, iPadOS, Linux, and in web browsers.

As of 2025, Discord has 200 million monthly active users and as of 2024, 19 million weekly active servers. It is primarily used by gamers, but the share of users interested in other topics is growing. As of July 2026, Discord is the 46th most visited website in the world according to Similarweb.

== History ==
Discord was conceived by Jason Citron and Stanislav Vishnevskiy. Citron founded the social gaming network OpenFeint, and later sold it to GREE in 2011 for $104 million, which he used to found Hammer & Chisel, a game development studio, in 2012. Its first product was Fates Forever, released in 2014, which Citron hoped would be the first multiplayer online battle arena (MOBA) game on mobile platforms, but it was not commercially successful.

According to Citron, during the development process, he noticed how difficult it was for his team to work out tactics in games like Final Fantasy XIV and League of Legends using available voice over IP (VoIP) software. This led to the development of a chat service with a focus on user friendliness with minimal impact on performance. The name "Discord" was chosen because it "sounds cool and has to do with talking", was easy to say, spell, remember, and was available for trademark and website. In addition, "Discord in the gaming community" was the problem he wished to solve.

To develop Discord, Hammer & Chisel gained additional funding from YouWeb's 9+ business incubator, which had also funded the startup of Hammer & Chisel, and from Benchmark capital and Tencent.

=== Release ===
Discord was publicly released in May 2015 under the domain name discordapp.com. According to Citron, it made no moves to target a specific audience, but some gaming-related subreddits quickly began to replace their IRC links with Discord links. Discord became widely used by esports and LAN tournament gamers. The company benefited from relationships with Twitch streamers and subreddit communities for Diablo and World of Warcraft.

In January 2016, Discord raised an additional $20 million in funding, including an investment from WarnerMedia (then TimeWarner). WarnerMedia was acquired by AT&T in 2018 and WarnerMedia Investment Group shut down in 2019, selling its equity.

In April 2018, Microsoft announced that it would provide Discord support for Xbox Live users, allowing them to link their Discord and Xbox Live accounts so that they could connect with their Xbox Live friends list through Discord.

In December 2018, Discord announced it had raised $150 million in funding at a $2 billion valuation. The round was led by Greenoaks Capital with participation from Firstmark, Tencent, IVP, Index Ventures, and Technology Opportunity Partners.

=== Evolution ===
In June 2020, Discord announced it was shifting focus away from video gaming specifically to a more all-purpose communication and chat client for all functions, revealing its new slogan "Your place to talk", along with a revised website. Among other planned changes was to reduce the number of gaming in-jokes it used within the client, improving the user onboarding experience, and increasing server capacity and reliability. The company announced it had received an additional $100 million in investments to help with these changes.

In March 2021, Discord announced it had hired its first chief financial officer, former head of finance for Pinterest Tomasz Marcinkowski. An inside source called this one of the first steps for the company toward an initial public offering, though Citron had said earlier in the month that he was not considering taking the company public. Discord doubled its monthly user base to about 140 million in 2020. The same month, Bloomberg News and The Wall Street Journal reported that several companies were looking to purchase Discord, with Microsoft named as the likely lead buyer at a value estimated at $10 billion. Discord ended talks with Microsoft, opting to stay independent. It launched another round of investment in April 2021. Among those investing in the company was Sony Interactive Entertainment, which said it intended to integrate some of Discord's services into the PlayStation Network by 2022.

The old Discord wordmark (2015–2021)

In May 2021, Discord rebranded its game controller-shaped logo "Clyde" in celebration of its sixth anniversary. It also made the color palette of its branding and user interfaces much more saturated, to be more "bold and playful", and changed its slogan from "your place to talk" to "imagine a place", believing that it would be easier to attach to additional taglines; these changes met with backlash and criticism from Discord users.

In July 2021, Discord acquired Sentropy, an internet moderation company.

Ahead of a funding round in August 2021, Discord had reported $130 million in 2020 revenue, triple that of 2019, and had an estimated valuation of $15 billion. According to Citron, the increased valuation was due to the shift away from "broadcast wide-open social media communication services to more small, intimate places", as well as increased usage during the COVID-19 pandemic. Discord captured users who were leaving Facebook and other platforms due to privacy concerns. The company secured an additional $500 million in investments in September 2021.

In September 2021, Google sent cease and desist notices to the developers of two of the most popular music bots used on Discord—Groovy and Rythm—which were used on an estimated 36 million servers. These bots allowed users to request and play songs in a voice channel, taking the songs from YouTube ad-free. Two weeks later, Discord partnered with YouTube to test a "Watch Together" feature, which allows Discord users to watch YouTube videos together.

Citron posted mockup images of Discord around the proposed Web3 principles with integrated cryptocurrency and non-fungible token support in November 2021, leading to criticism from its user base. Citron later said, "We [...] want to clarify we have no plans to ship it at this time."

The CNIL fined Discord €800,000 in November 2022 for violating the European Union's General Data Protection Regulation (GDPR). The violations CNIL found were that the application would continue to run in the background after it was closed and would not disconnect the user from a voice chat, as well as allowing users to create passwords of only six characters.

=== Recent ===
In early 2023, Discord was used to publish classified United States documents in one of the most significant intelligence leaks in recent history. The documents, distributed on a Minecraft Discord server as photos, detailed the state of the Russo-Ukrainian war, surveillance of allied and adversarial nations, and cracks in alliances with nations aligned with the United States.

In August 2023, Discord cut 4% of its staff, laying off 40 employees as part of a restructuring effort. On December 5, Discord revamped its mobile app for iOS and Android devices. It added features such as dark mode for OLED screens, voice messages, and new icons.

After a fivefold increase in employees between 2020 and 2024, Discord laid off 17%, or 170 employees, in January 2024.

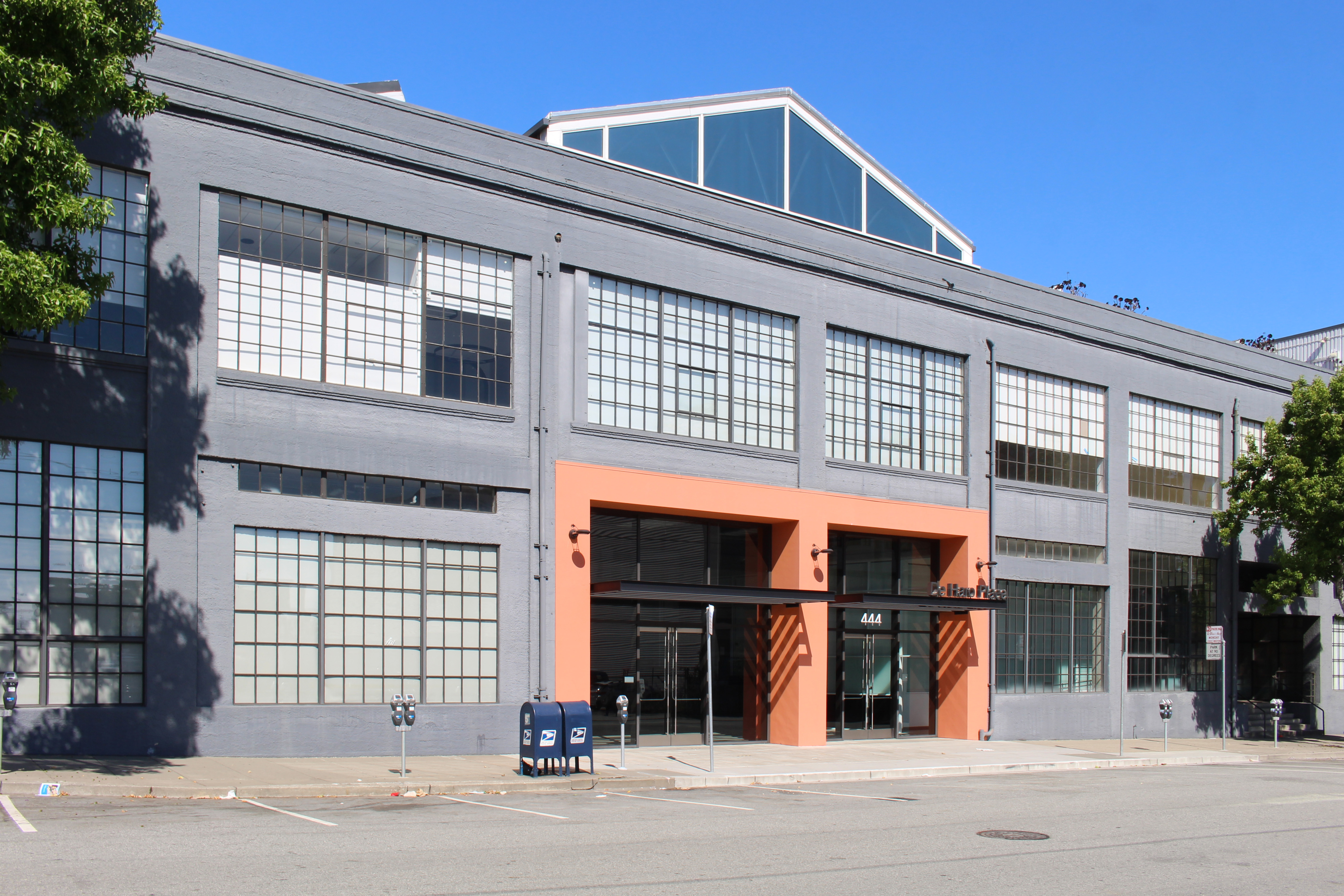
Discord headquarters in San Francisco

On April Fools' Day 2024, Discord apparently broke the record for the most viewed YouTube video in 24 hours after the Discord client played the announcement video on loop in the app itself. More than 1.3 billion views were removed two days later when YouTube fixed the view count. No records were broken by the April Fools' Day video.

Citron announced in April 2025 that he was stepping down as Discord's CEO but would remain on the board of directors, with Humam Sakhnini, a former Activision Blizzard executive, becoming CEO. Citron wrote this move was in anticipation of making Discord a publicly traded company.

During the Gen Z protests of 2025, many demonstrations were organized on the platform. In September, Discord was used in the 2025 Nepal protests and to help elect a new prime minister despite being banned in Nepal along with other social media except TikTok. The Moroccan protests at the end of that month also originated on Discord, using the platform for organising and public statements. After the suspect in the assassination of Charlie Kirk earlier that month confessed to the killing on the platform, Sakhnini was called to testify before the United States House Committee on Oversight and Government Reform on "the radicalization of online forum users, including instances of open incitement to commit politically motivated acts".

Bloomberg News reported that in mid-January 2026, Discord filed plans in confidence for an initial public offering (IPO), supported by Goldman Sachs and JP Morgan banks.

On May 11, 2026, a new tier of Xbox Game Pass was added to Discord Nitro. Titled "Starter Edition", it includes a limited library of over 50 games from the standard subscription, as well 10 hours of Xbox Cloud Gaming access each month. Xbox also announced perks from Discord Nitro for Xbox Game Pass subscribers, with 250 Discord Orbs each month, 1.2x extra Orbs when completing Discord Quests, and automatically applied Discord Shop discounts being included.

== Features ==
Discord is centered around managing communities. Communication tools such as voice and video calls, persistent chat rooms, and integrations with other gamer-focused services along with the general ability to send direct messages and create personal groups are present.

=== Servers ===
Discord communities are organized into discrete collections of channels called servers. Although they are referred to as servers on the front end, they are called "guilds" in the developer documentation, to distinguish themselves from physical computer servers. Users can create servers for free, manage their public visibility, and create voice channels, text channels, and categories to sort the channels into. Servers have a limit of 25,000,000 members. Users can also create roles and assign them to server members. Roles can, among other things, determine which channels users have access to, change users’ colors, and designate a server's moderation team. The previously largest known Discord server was Snowsgiving 2021, an official Discord-controlled server made for the 2021 winter holiday season. It reached 1 million members. In 2023, the server for Midjourney reached over 15 million members, making it the largest server on Discord.

Since 2017, Discord has allowed game developers and publishers to verify their servers. Verified servers, like verified accounts on social media, have badges to mark them as official. A verified server is moderated by its developers' or publishers' moderation team. Verification was extended in February 2018 to include esports teams and musical artists. By the end of 2017, about 450 servers were verified. In 2023, Discord paused the verification program to perform maintenance. The program has not been reopened as of September 2024.

Discord announced a partnership with Google in October 2026 to allow messages on discoverable public servers to be indexed and searched by Google as to appear in Google's search results. Server admins can opt out of this feature, and individual users can also opt out for their messages. Users under 18 are automatically opted out and cannot opt in. The feature was added as Discord had become a favored means to rely information and answer questions over site forums, a similar approach Google used with Reddit.

=== Channel types ===
Channels may be used for voice chat, streaming, instant messaging, and file sharing.

Discord launched Stage Channels in May 2021, a feature similar to Clubhouse that allows for live, moderated channels, audio talks, discussions, and other uses, which can be limited to invited or ticketed users. Initially, users could search for open Stage Channels relevant to their interests through a Stage Discovery tool. It was discontinued in October 2021.

In August 2021, Discord launched Threads, temporary text channels that can be set to automatically disappear. This is meant to help foster more communication within servers.

Forum Channels, which allow for longer and separate conversations, were introduced in September 2022. They bring an Internet forum experience to Discord.

Discord launched Media Channels in June 2023. Media Channels are restricted to videos and images only.

=== User profiles ===
Users register for Discord with an email address and must create a username. Until mid-2023, to allow multiple users to use the same username, each user was assigned a four-digit number called a "discriminator" (colloquially a "Discord tag"), prefixed with "#" and added to the end of their username. Users who subscribed to Discord Nitro could change this tag to any four-digit number. This system was changed to a handle-based system in May 2023, removing the discriminator from usernames. This new system mandated a change of username. Users selected their new usernames in priority based on how early they registered for Discord, Nitro status, and ownership of partner and verified servers. Users criticized the impersonation risk if another user claimed their previous username.

In June 2021, Discord added a feature that allows users to add an about me section to their profiles and a custom colored banner at the top of their profile. Subscribers to Discord Nitro can upload static or animated images as their banners instead of solid colors.

=== Video calls and streaming ===
Video calling and screen sharing were added in October 2017, allowing users to create private video calls with up to 10 users, later increased to 50 due to the increased popularity of video calling during the COVID-19 pandemic.

In August 2019, this was expanded with live streaming channels in servers. A user can share their entire screen, or a specific application, and others in that channel can choose to watch the stream. While these features somewhat mimic the livestreaming capabilities of platforms like Twitch, Discord does not plan to compete with these services, as these features were made for small groups.

Voice and video calls are end-to-end encrypted by default since May 2025. Text messages remain unencrypted.

=== Digital distribution ===
In August 2018, Discord launched a games storefront beta, allowing users to purchase a curated set of games through the service. This will include a "First on Discord" featured set of games that their developers attest to Discord's help in getting launched, giving these games 90 days of exclusivity on the Discord marketplace. Discord Nitro subscribers will also gain access to a rotating set of games as part of their subscription, with the price of Nitro being bumped from $4.99 to $9.99 a month. A cheaper service, "Nitro Classic", was released with the same perks as Nitro but without free games.

Following the launch of the Epic Games Store, which challenged Valve's Steam storefront by only taking a 12% cut of game revenue, Discord announced in December 2018 that it would reduce its own revenue cut to 10%.

To further support developers, starting in March 2019 Discord gave the ability for developers and publishers that ran their own servers to offer their games through a dedicated store channel on their server, with Discord managing the payment processing and distribution. This can be used, for example, to give select users access to alpha- and beta-builds of a game in progress as an early access alternative.

Also in March 2019, Discord removed the digital storefront, instead choosing to focus on the Nitro subscription and having direct sales be done through developer's own servers. In September 2019, Discord announced that it was ending its free game service in October 2019 as they found too few people were playing the games offered.

In December 2021, direct sales of game licenses were discontinued, and in March 2022 all store functionality was sunset.

=== Developer tools and bots ===
In December 2016, Discord introduced its GameBridge API, which allows game developers to directly integrate with Discord within games.

In December 2017, Discord added a software development kit (SDK) that allows developers to integrate their games with the service, called "rich presence". This integration is commonly used to allow players to join each other's games through Discord or to display information about a player's game progression in their Discord profile.

Bots are community-made tools to automate tasks. When installed by server owners, they may aid in moderation, host mini games, and perform myriad other automated tasks. As of 2021, about 430,000 bots were active in about 30% of all servers. Discord provides official bot APIs that allow custom elements such as dropdowns and buttons. In spring 2022, Discord released an official "app directory" where server owners can add bots to their servers in-Discord. The Verge called bots an "important part of Discord".

In March 2023, Discord started testing an AI chatbot using OpenAI's models, named "Clyde", based on their logo, but it was only accessible to certain servers. It was shut down in December 2023, and no reason has been provided yet.

A Social SDK was released in March 2025 that allows games to incorporate Discord's social features and assists with in-game communications between Discord and non-Discord users.

=== Unofficial extensions ===
Although Discord disallows modifications, many unofficial extensions have been created. Among these is BetterDiscord, an open-source desktop modification that allows various plugins to be installed. These plugins augment existing functionality or add features Discord does not offer. One allows users to apply custom themes for free; another allows increasing the volume of a voice-call participant beyond the default. BetterDiscord has generally been well-received, though PC Gamer has said it is prone to crashes and bugs. According to its developers, BetterDiscord users are not at risk of being sanctioned by Discord so long as they do not use additional modifications that violate Discord's terms of service.

== Infrastructure ==
Discord is a persistent group chat software, based on an eventually consistent database architecture. Discord was originally built on MongoDB. The infrastructure migrated to Apache Cassandra when the platform reached a billion messages, then to ScyllaDB when it reached a trillion messages.

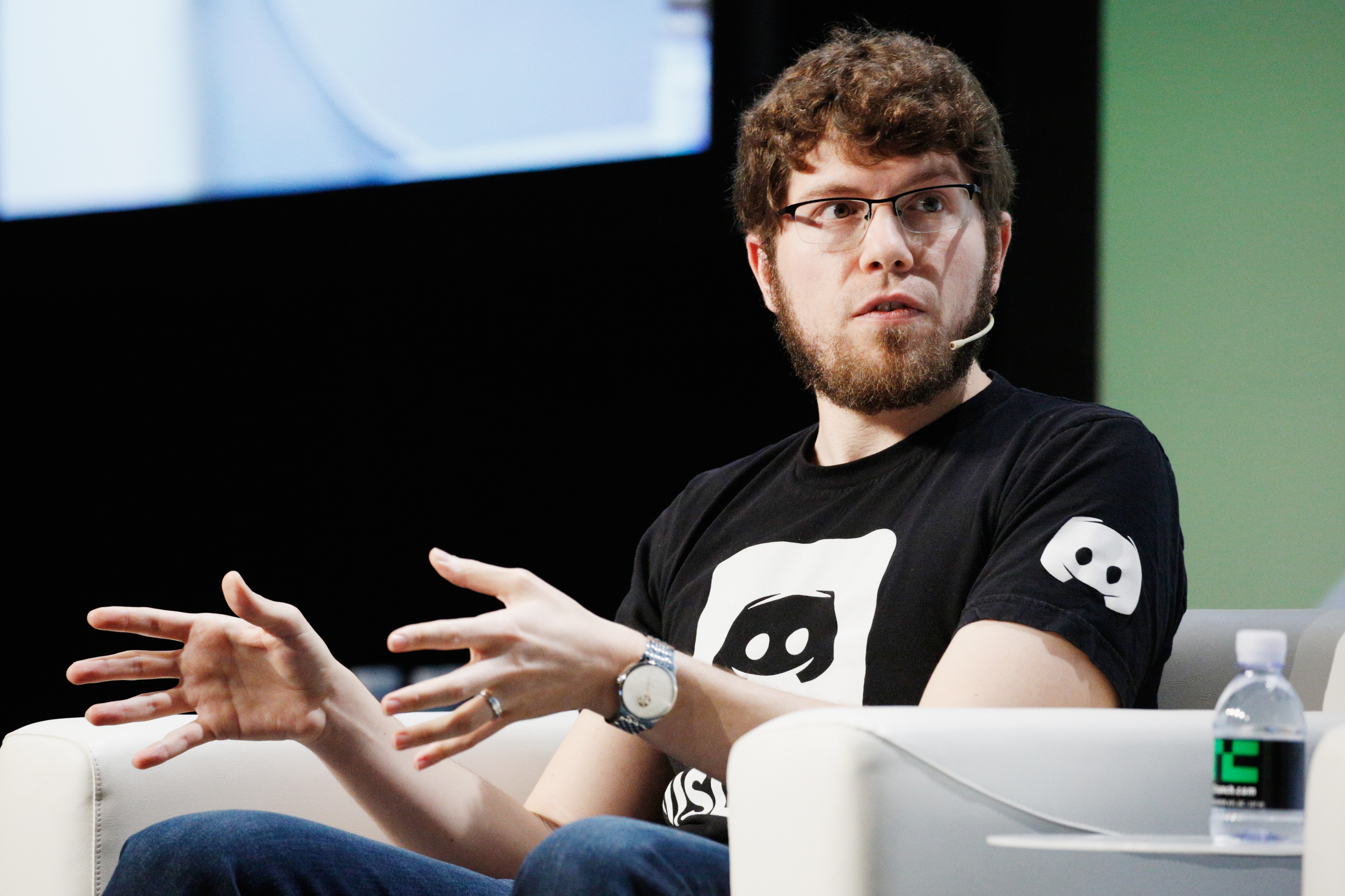
Jason Citron, Discord co-founder and former CEO, at TechCrunch Disrupt 2018

The desktop, web, and iOS apps use React, using React Native on iOS/iPadOS. The Android app was originally written natively but now shares code with the iOS app. The desktop client is built on the Electron software framework using web technologies, which allows it to be multi-platform and operate as an installed application on personal computers.

The software is supported by Google Cloud Platform's infrastructure in more than 30 data centres in 13 regions to keep latency with clients low.

For its WebRTC transport of voice and video, Discord uses dedicated server infrastructure from Datapacket.

In July 2020, Discord added noise suppression into its mobile app using the Krisp audio-filtering technology.

Discord's backend is written mostly in Elixir and Python, as well as Rust, Go, and C++.

In October 2026, Discord switched from a C++ media engine to a Rust media engine for sharing images and video. Images resize efficiently with better color quality.

== Monetization ==
While the software itself comes at no cost, the developers investigated ways to monetize it, with options including paid customization options such as emoji or stickers.

In January 2017, the first paid subscription and features were released with "Discord Nitro Classic" (originally "Discord Nitro"). For a monthly fee of $4.99, users got an animated avatar, custom and/or animated emojis across all servers (non-Nitro users could only use custom emoji on the server they were added to), an increased maximum file size on file uploads (from 8 MB to 50 MB), screen sharing in higher resolution, choice of discriminator (from #0001 to #9999), and a unique profile badge.

In October 2018, "Discord Nitro" was renamed "Discord Nitro Classic" with the introduction of the new "Discord Nitro", which cost $9.99 and included access to select PC games through the Discord game store. Monthly subscribers of Discord Nitro Classic at the time of the introduction of the Discord games store were gifted with Discord Nitro until January 1, 2020, and yearly subscribers of Discord Nitro Classic were gifted with Discord Nitro until January 1, 2021.

In October 2019, Discord ended its free game service with Nitro.

In June 2019, Discord introduced Server Boosts, a way to benefit specific servers by purchasing "boosts" for them, with enough boosts granting various benefits for the users in that server. Each boost is a subscription costing $4.99 a month. For example, if a server maintains two boosts, it unlocks perks such as a higher maximum audio quality in voice channels and the ability to use an animated server icon. Users with Discord Nitro or Discord Nitro Classic have a 30% discount on server boost costs, with Nitro subscribers specifically also getting two free server boosts.

Discord began testing digital stickers on its platform in October 2020 for users in Canada. Most stickers cost between $1.50 and $2.25. Discord Nitro subscribers received a free "What's Up Wumpus" sticker pack focused on Discord's mascot, Wumpus. In May 2023, Discord made most stickers free to all users. The ability to purchase stickers was discontinued, and users who had done so were refunded.

In October 2022, the "Discord Nitro Classic" subscription tier was replaced by a $2.99 "Discord Nitro Basic", which features a subset of features from the $9.99 "Nitro" tier.

Discord added Avatar Decorations and Profile Themes in October 2023. Users can purchase animated decorations for their profiles from Discord's Shop.

Another way Discord makes money is through a 10% commission as a distribution fee for all games sold through game developers' verified servers.

== Reception ==
By January 2016, Hammer & Chisel reported Discord had been used by 3 million people, with growth of 1 million per month, reaching 11 million users in July. By December, the company reported it had 25 million users worldwide. By the end of 2017, the service had drawn nearly 90 million users, with roughly 1.5 million new users each week. With the service's third anniversary, Discord said it had 130 million unique registered users. The company observed that while the bulk of its servers were used for gaming-related purposes, a few had been created by users for non-gaming activities, like stock trading, fantasy football, and other shared interest groups.

In May 2016, one year after the software's release, Tom Marks, writing for PC Gamer, called Discord the best VoIP service available. Lifehacker praised Discord's interface, ease of use, and platform compatibility.

In 2021, Discord had at least 350 million registered users across its web and mobile platforms. It was used by 56 million people every month, sending a total of 25 billion messages per month. By June 2020, the company reported it had 100 million active users each month. As of 2024, the service had over 227 million monthly active users.

== Criticisms and controversies ==
=== Cyberbullying and moderation ===
Discord has had problems with hostile behavior and abuse within chats, with some communities of chat servers being "raided" (a large number of users joining a server with malicious intent) by other communities. This includes flooding chats with controversial topics related to race, religion, politics, and pornography. In 2017, Discord said it planned to implement changes that would "rid the platform of the issue".

Discord has a Trust and Safety department, which is tasked with responding to user reports. But because Discord centers around private communities, research on its effectiveness is hard to do. A study in New Media & Society criticized Discord's offloading of server search functions to unmoderated third-party apps, saying that it facilitates hateful communities to find new audience.

In January 2018, The Daily Beast reported that it found several Discord servers specifically engaged in distributing revenge porn and facilitating harassment of these images' and videos' victims. Such actions are against Discord's terms of service and Discord shut down servers and banned users identified from these servers.

=== Data privacy and data breaches ===
In September 2024, the Federal Trade Commission released a report summarizing nine company responses (including from Discord) to orders the agency made pursuant to Section 6(b) of the Federal Trade Commission Act of 1914 to provide information about user and non-user data collection (including of children and teenagers) and data use. The report found that the companies' data practices made people vulnerable to identity theft, stalking, unlawful discrimination, emotional distress, mental health issues, social stigma, and reputational harm.

In September 2025, Discord's customer services, which are provided by Zendesk, suffered a data breach, which notably exposed images of users' government-issued IDs used to appeal age estimations. Threat actors claim to have stolen 1.5 terabytes of sensitive data, including over 2.1 million government-issued identification photos used for age verification. Discord claims 70,000 users are impacted. Discord began notifying users of the breach in early October.

In October 2026, hackers stole millions of Discord user data found in the third-party security app Double Counter.

=== Use by extremist users and groups ===
Discord gained popularity with the alt-right due to its pseudonymity and privacy. Analyst Keegan Hankes of the Southern Poverty Law Center said, "It's pretty unavoidable to be a leader in this [alt-right] movement without participating in Discord".

Citron said that servers found to be engaged in illegal activity or violations of the terms of service would be shut down, but gave no examples.

After the violent events during the Unite the Right rally in Charlottesville, Virginia, on August 12, 2017, it was found that Discord had been used to plan and organize the white nationalist rally. This included participation by Richard Spencer and Andrew Anglin, high-level figures in the movement. Discord responded by closing servers that supported the alt-right and far-right and banning users who had participated. Discord's executives condemned "white supremacy" and "neo-Nazism" and said that these groups "are not welcome on Discord". Discord has worked with the Southern Poverty Law Center to identify hateful groups using Discord and ban those groups from the service. Since then, it has shut down several neo-Nazi and alt-right servers, including those operated by neo-Nazi terrorist group Atomwaffen Division, Nordic Resistance Movement, Iron March, and European Domas.

In March 2019, the media collective Unicorn Riot published the contents of a Discord server used by several members of the white nationalist group Identity Evropa who were also members of the United States Armed Forces. Unicorn Riot has since published member lists and contents of several dozen servers connected to alt-right, white supremacist, and other such movements.

In January 2021, two days after the U.S. Capitol attack, Discord deleted the pro-Donald Trump server "The Donald", "due to its overt connection to an online forum used to incite violence, plan an armed insurrection in the United States, and spread harmful misinformation related to 2020 U.S. election fraud" but said there was no evidence the server was used to organize the attack on the Capitol building. The server had been used by former members of the r/The_Donald subreddit, which Reddit had deleted several months earlier.

In January 2022, the British anti-disinformation organization Logically reported that Holocaust denial, neo-Nazism, and other forms of hate speech were flourishing on the Discord and Telegram groups of the German website Disclose.tv.

In May 2022, Payton S. Gendron was named as the suspect in a race-driven mass shooting in Buffalo, New York, that killed ten people. It was reported that Gendron used a private Discord server as a diary for weeks as he prepared for the attack. About 30 minutes before the shooting, he invited several users to view the server and read the messages. The messages were later published on 4chan. Discord told the press that moderators deleted the server shortly after the shooting. The New York state attorney general's office announced an investigation of Discord among other online services in the wake of the shooting to determine whether it had taken enough steps to prevent such content from being broadcast on its services, with which Discord said it would comply.

After the assassination of Charlie Kirk in September 2025, FBI director Kash Patel announced that more than 20 users in a Discord community had been placed under investigation after it was found the alleged shooter, Tyler James Robinson, had posted messages in the group admitting guilt for the attack. Before Robinson's arrest, users in the group had also exchanged messages comparing supposed images of the shooter to Robinson, who joked he was being framed by a doppelgänger. Discord later suspended Robinson's account.

=== Child grooming and safety ===
CNN has reported that Discord has had problems with sexual exploitation of children and young teenagers on its platform.

In July 2018, Discord updated its terms of service to ban drawn pornography with underage subjects. Some Discord users subsequently criticized the moderation staff for selectively allowing "cub" content, or underage pornographic furry artwork, under the same guidelines. The staff held that "cub porn" was different from lolicon and shotacon and "allowable as long as it is tagged properly". After numerous complaints from the community, Discord amended its community guidelines in February 2019 to disallow the sexualization of "non-humanoid animals and mythological creatures as long as they appear to be underage", and announced periodic transparency reports to better communicate with users.

In June 2023, NBC News reported that it had identified 35 cases of adults being charged with "kidnapping, grooming, or sexual assault" that involved Discord. It also discovered 165 cases of prosecution for sharing child sexual exploitation material on the platform.

In March 2024, a joint investigation by The Washington Post, Wired, Der Spiegel, and Recorder outlined the extensive child grooming, sexual abuse (including sextortion), and murder conducted by a group known as 764 on Discord. The investigation linked 764 and its associated groups and servers to cases in Germany, United States, and Romania dating to April 2021. Discord's representative said the service filed hundreds of reports and removed over 34,000 accounts associated with the group.

The Brazilian government ordered Discord to block its livestreaming services in the country on August 12, 2026, following the suicide of a 13-year-old girl who had been encouraged to do so by others over a livestream. While those involved were also being charged, Brazil claimed that Discord failed to take appropriate measures under its child safety laws to protect children from such content and would fine the company if it failed to disable livestreaming within three days. Discord said it was cooperating with Brazilian authorities.

=== Age verification ===
Around April 2025, Discord began experimenting with age verification on the service for some users, ahead of enforcement periods for online safety laws in the UK (the Online Safety Act 2023) and Australia (the Online Safety Amendment). At this point, the age verification was only used if the user had not yet completed other age verification steps within the Discord app, and if they either access or attempt to change content settings to view explicit content. The process either required a face scan, which Discord claimed never left the user's device and used in-app tools developed by third parties to determine the user's age, or through scanning of a government-issued identification, which was reviewed by a third-party company. The age verification was mandated for all British users by July 2025 to comply with the law. While the Online Safety Amendment in Australia ultimately discounted communication services like Discord from enforcing age restrictions, Discord still opted to require all Australian users to use age verification in December 2025 as the law came into enforcement.

Discord announced that it would implement global age verification in March 2026, similar to the methods used in the UK and Australia. All existing accounts will be marked as "teen" by default, until the user completes the age verification step, either through a face scan or a government-issued ID. An age inference model would use AI-powered tools to analyze existing users based on their profile, usage, and gaming history to determine if they are adults, to verify them automatically. Teen accounts would not be able to join servers or channels marked as adult, while existing accounts will not be able to see the contents of these servers until verifying their age. Discord will review servers not already marked as adult using AI tools and some human review to determine if they should be marked as adult servers.

Many users stated they would leave Discord due to the policy, citing concerns surrounding the September 2025 breach. Other concerns were raised about the AI not being able to correctly guess the user's age, comparing the age-verification to Roblox's own age-verification system being bypassed by minors using computer-generated images, or the AI generally failing to guess the user's age, even without the use of computer-generated images. In response to the negative feedback, Discord stated that they expect "the vast majority of people" will be marked appropriately by its age inference model and will never be asked for age verification, clarifying that verification would only be required when the inference model fails to make a clear determination in the user's age. Other concerns were raised by certain third-party vendors that were involved in the age verification process. For some UK users, their face scan or government ID scan would be processed by Persona, a company that has received funding from Peter Thiel, and leave their information with Persona for up to seven days. Due to user backlash to the use of Persona, Discord stated they had terminated its testing with Persona.

Around a week after announcing the plans for age verification, Discord said they would delay the global rollout until the second half of 2026 to address user concerns, but will continue to implement this for countries where it is legally required. Among changes to their plan will be allowing the use of credit cards for verification, providing transparency on the list of partners they will use of these checks, and allowing servers to remain at a teen rating with exemptions for "spoiler" channels that will require age verification to view.

Multiple U.S. states have sued Discord; the state of Texas sued Discord in May 2026 over its failure to prevent exposure of minors to sexual exploitation and extremist content, required by the state's SCOPE Act. In July 2026, the judge issued an order that Discord had 90 days to implement the same protections for minors it had set up in the UK for Texas users.

Discord affirmed it would be rolling out age verification during the last weeks of September 2026. The updated system will use contextual information such as account age and activity to determine the user's age, with Discord estimating that 90% of the users will be tagged under this. Where this system fails to positively identify the user's age, only then the user will be asked to use a third-party age verification service.

On September 25, 2026, users on X responded to a post by Discord acknowledging issues with age verification rollout by posting art depicting violence against Discord's mascot, Wumpus.

=== Bans ===
On January 27, 2021, Discord banned the r/WallStreetBets server during the GameStop short squeeze, citing "hateful and discriminatory content", which users found contentious. The next day, Discord allowed another server to be created and began assisting with moderation on it.

=== Censorship ===
In September 2024, according to Russian media Kommersant, Russian regulator Roskomnadzor was planning to block Discord. Roskomnadzor demanded that Discord remove 947 posts containing illegal content and fined it 3.5 million rubles ($37,493). On October 8, Russia officially blocked Discord.

After a decision by the Ankara 1st Criminal Court of Peace, several hours after Russia's block, Turkey blocked Discord over concerns about child abuse and obscene content. The decision was made after two women in Istanbul were murdered by a Discord user who allegedly garnered support for his action from Discord users before dying by suicide on 4 October 2024.

Discord is blocked by the Great Firewall in China. Chinese police interrogate people who make sensitive comments on the platform.

On September 24, 2026, the Philippine Department of Information and Communications Technology (DICT) confirmed that Discord has been banned in the country after failing to comply to a 24-hour notice ordering the company to set up a Philippine office. The ban was lifted the same day following a meeting between Discord and the Cybercrime Investigation and Coordinating Center (CICC).

== See also ==
- Comparison of cross-platform instant messaging clients
- Comparison of VoIP software
- List of freeware
