= Radio Gree Night =

Japanese radio program

Kana Hanasawa and Sora Amamiya's Radio Gree Night (Japanese: 花澤香菜・雨宮天のRADIO GREE NIGHT, Hepburn: Hanazawa Kana, Amamiya Sora no Radio Gree Night) is a Japanese radio program broadcast by Nippon Cultural Broadcasting.

== Summary ==
The program is sponsored by GREE. The program itself and a short bonus evaluation program are available on the YouTube channel of the same company as well.

This is the first radio program hosted together by Kana Hanazawa and Sora Amamiya.
