= Humam =

Humam (Arabic: همام) is a masculine given name and surname of Arabic origin. Notable people with this name include:

== Give name ==
- Humam Khalil Abu-Mulal al-Balawi (1977–2009), Jordanian doctor and terrorist
- Humam Quader Chowdhury (born 1983), Bangladeshi politician
- Humam Abd al-Khaliq Abd al-Ghafur (born 1945), Iraqi academic and politician
- Humam Hamoudi (born 1956), Iraqi politician
- Humam Sakhnini (born 1968), Israeli Arab executive
- Humam-i Tabrizi (1238/39–1314/15), Sufi poet
- Humam Tariq (born 1994), Iraqi football player

== Surname ==
- Hakim Humam (died 1595), 16th century Mughal official
- Al-Kamal ibn al-Humam (1388–1457), Egyptian jurist
