= OpenFeint =

Social platform for mobile games

- Release: February 17, 2009; 17 years ago
- Stable release: 2.7.5 (1.7 Android) / Nov 5, 2010 (Jan 27, 2011 Android)
- Operating system: Android, iOS
- Type: Social networking
- Website: https://www.gree.net Or http://www.openfeint.com/

OpenFeint was a social platform for mobile games for devices running on Android or iOS. It was developed by Aurora Feint, a company named after a video game by the same developers. The platform consisted of an SDK for use by games, allowing its various social networking features to be integrated into the game's functionality. OpenFeint was discontinued at the end of 2012.

== History ==
OpenFeint was founded by Jason Citron, who later founded Discord. The first iteration of OpenFeint was launched on February 17, 2009.

Version 2.0 was released in June 2009, and marked the first time that the platform was free for developers to integrate into their own applications. Harris Tsim joined to help with engineering.

Version 2.1 was released on August 14, 2009, featuring "Social challenges", which allowed users to create tasks for themselves and their friends to attempt within games and notified users when new challenges were available. It also allowed users to add "Friends" and introduced a new user interface.

Version 2.4 was released on January 8, 2010, with a revamped layout and a standalone OpenFeint app. As of January 2010, there were over 900 applications in the iOS App Store that used OpenFeint, and there were over ten million users registered on the network.

On September 15, 2010, OpenFeint announced that it would be supporting Android. The9 invested $5 million in the platform, and in October, Intel Capital announced that it had invested $3 million, combining with DeNA's $6 million investment to bring total investments to $12 million.

In 2011, OpenFeint was party to a class action suit with allegations including computer fraud, invasion of privacy, breach of contract, bad faith and seven other statutory violations. According to a news report "OpenFeint's business plan included accessing and disclosing personal information without authorization to mobile-device application developers, advertising networks and web-analytic vendors that market mobile applications".

In 2011, due to monetization struggles and the introduction of Game Center, OpenFeint was acquired by the Japanese company GREE for $104 million.

On November 16, 2012, GREE announced that it would be discontinuing the service on December 14, 2012, primarily in favor of its own similar platform.

== Notable applications ==
The following is a list of some of the many applications that used or were integrated with OpenFeint:

- 101-in-1 Games
- 3D Rollercoaster Rush
- Arriving
- Bloons TD Mobile
- Birdstrike
- Bomberman Touch 2: Volcano Party
- Cytus
- Fieldrunners
- Fruit Ninja
- Galaxy on Fire
- geoDefense
- geoDefense Swarm
- geoSpark
- Hook Worlds
- Jet Car Stunts
- Jetpack Joyride
- Minigore
- The Moron Test
- Pocket God
- Robot Unicorn Attack
- Space Freight
- Super QuickHook
- Tiny Wings
- World of Goo

== See also ==
- Social discovery platform
- Similar social platforms include Scoreloop and Apple's Game Center.
