= Faint =

Faint or Fainting may refer to:

- Syncope (medicine), a medical term for fainting
- Lightheadedness, in the sense of "feeling faint"
- "Faint" (song) by Linkin Park
- The Faint, a dance-punk/rock band

== See also ==
- Feint (disambiguation)
