= Mikey Shorts =

2012 video game

- Developer: BeaverTap Games
- Publisher: Noodlecake Studios (Android)
- Platforms: iOS, Android
- Release: August 23, 2012
- Genre: Platform

Mikey Shorts is an iOS platform game from American developer BeaverTap Games and released on August 23, 2012. It is part of the Mikey series of games, which includes Mikey Boots and Mikey Hooks.

== Reception ==
Reception

Aggregate score
Aggregator	Score
Metacritic	92/100

Review score
Publication	Score
TouchArcade	5/5

The game has received critical acclaim, garnering a score of 92/100 on Metacritic, based on 11 critic reviews.

Slide to Play wrote "Mikey Shorts is pure retro goodness, all wrapped up in a modern package. While its influences may be visible from space, it doesn't change the fact that this game is pure fun to play. Even after playing through the game in a matter of hours, we were desperate to go back to see if we could change those hours into minutes, and get all the coins, too." TouchArcade said "There are a lot of reasons to love a game. Great challenge, fun with friends, gorgeous design-all good reasons. Despite its rough edges, Mikey Shorts gets to me because it brings me to a place where I can play and have a great time, without hitting walls, without getting frustrated, without having to pass it on to the next kid in line. It's a good feeling, one I don't particularly want to give up."

Gamezebo wrote "A wonderful time sink that hasn't forgotten the principles of giving back to its players. This is a title pared down to precious few actions, but designed so well that nothing ever gets stale. A glowing, beeping slice of pure, simple fun." AppAdvice said "Mikey Shorts is a game that truly has something for everyone. Want to have fun? Story mode. Looking for a serious challenge? Challenge mode. Mikey Shorts is well worth its $0.99 download price." AppSpy wrote "The days of simply slugging your way through repetitive levels with no objective are thankfully long-dead and Mikey Shorts provides players with multiple objectives, achievements and modes to enjoy with flawless controls; a real platforming gem." 148Apps said "I've gotten absolutely hooked on Mikey Shorts. I felt compelled to get 100% in Story mode. I keep going back to play more of the 48 Challenge levels. I collect coins so I can run amok in a top hat, monocle, and duck bill because why not. But most of all, it's the way that the game is designed to be empowering."

Modojo wrote "Mikey Shorts manages to stand tall amongst the best the platform genre has to offer, and you should make a point to download it in the very near future." Hyper Magazine said the game provides "a few hours of solid entertainment." Multiplayer.it wrote "It's a platformer completely devoted to its time attack mechanics, which leaves much to be desired in terms of graphics and extra content and thus might not appeal to everybody. " Pocket Gamer said "Mikey Shorts is a speed-run platformer that's all about learning levels and nailing jumps with expert precision. If you prefer to take it slow, though, Mikey's unimaginative design will fail to thrill." TouchGen wrote "Controls are simple and effective. A two-way control pad for movement and two large buttons for jumping and sliding under low platforms. They're responsive and work well without getting in the way."
