= The Moron Test =

- App Store art
- Developer: DistinctDev
- Publisher: DistinctDev
- Platforms: iOS, Windows Phone, Android
- Genre: Entertainment
- Mode: Single-player

The Moron Test is a mobile brain teasing game developed and published by American studio DistinctDev, Inc. for the iOS and Android platforms, and is one of the best selling iPhone applications of all-time. The Moron Test was initially released on April 20, 2009 for iOS and was released for Android on May 13, 2010. Its format is inspired by IQ tests that pose seemingly simple questions in order to extrapolate broad indices of intelligence. Upon its initial release on iTunes, The Moron Test became the #1 top selling app in the U.S. App Store. The app has repeatedly reached a Top 10 Overall ranking and has been in the Top 100 Overall apps for over 450 consecutive days in the US App Store. On September 10, 2010, DistinctDev released The Moron Test: Section 1, a free version of the game on iOS, offering the "Old School" section. Two months after the Android platform launch, the free version received more than 700,000 downloads, the paid version became the 9th most downloaded paid game with over 65,000 downloads on the Android market. The Moron Test has seven sections: Old School, Late Registration, Winter Break, Food Fight, Skip Day, Tricky Treat, and Ooga School. The latest iOS version of includes an in-app purchase for the Extra Credit section, Flying Colors.

== Gameplay ==
In The Moron Test, players are given a scripted series of seemingly simple tasks to complete or questions to answer. The tasks increase in difficulty, challenging players to identify the correct responses under abnormal and deceptive circumstances. Depending on how many correct answers they can give without making more than three mistakes, players are awarded one of seven rankings. Failing before the first checkpoint earns a "Moron" title and completing an entire section earns a "Genius" rank.

=== Rounds and rankings ===
Players are given a rank after completing each round:

- Round 1: You Have a Pulse
- Round 2: Total Bonehead
- Round 3: Average Mammal
- Round 4: Slightly Smart
- Round 5: Somewhat Intelligent
- Round 6: Genius

=== Question types ===
Each Section has 100+ steps and 45+ tasks consisting of the following question types:

- Calculations
- Matching
- Memorizing
- Identifying

=== Psychological principles ===
The Moron Test exploits the human tendency to rely on heuristics when making decisions.

== Sections ==
Each Section of The Moron Test includes over 100 steps.

=== 1: Old School ===
Old School was the only section of the game included at the launch of the iOS version of the Moron Test. Players must carefully follow the instructions written on digital index cards to progress. The objects that are used in this section are elementary school themed, featuring planets and math symbols. In this section of the Moron Test, the Rubber Duck, the Bee, the Mouse, and the Angry Duck are introduced.

The Moron Test is a quiz game. The Old School level is shown here.

=== 2: Late Registration ===
Late Registration was added in iOS version 2.0, updating the game with new question types and introducing new characters to the game: the Green Frog, the Giraffe, and the Turtle. This update also introduced the "Grey Card", which contains misleading instructions that are not to be followed.

=== 3: Winter Break ===
Winter Break was added in iOS Version 3.0, released on December 21, 2009. Players are introduced to the Disassembled Snowman and the Penguins. Many of the tasks in this section are winter-themed, such as saving characters that are trapped in ice.

=== 4: Food Fight ===
Food Fight, was added in iOS Version 4.0, introduced several new characters, including the Monkey, the Snake, and the Lady Bug. Set in the midst of a cafeteria food fight, Section 4 adds flying food being thrown across the screen as an added distraction. In this section, players can turn on a black light, revealing hidden instructions and objects.

=== 5: Skip Day ===
Skip Day, added on August 24, 2011, introduced the Crab. It was set in the beach. In this section, some questions have flies. You must shake your device to get rid of them or else you will fail.

=== 6: Tricky Treat ===
Tricky Treat, added on October 26, 2012, introduced the bat. It has Halloween-themed questions. In this section, some questions have lanterns. Tap them and remember the place of the item that is telling you to tap.

=== Ooga School ===
Ooga School is a Pocket God-themed remake of Old School. It has different music. It is currently unnumbered.

=== Extra credit: Flying Colors ===
Flying Colors (Extra Credit Expansion Pack) was added in iOS Version 4.0. It includes three mini-games that test the players’ speed, memory, and reflexes, respectively. It is available as an in-app purchase for $0.99.

The Android version of The Moron Test included Old School, Late Registration, and Winter Break when it was launched on May 13, 2010. Food Fight was the first section to launch simultaneously on both platforms.

== OpenFeint ==
With the "Food Fight" update of The Moron Test on July 24, 2010, DistinctDev added the social platform OpenFeint to the iOS version of the game. OpenFeint allows players to submit their fastest finish times to Global Leaderboards and compare their times with friends. On September 15, 2010, DistinctDev announced OpenFeint integration for The Moron Test on Android. This introduced the same social features as the iOS version: friends lists, chat rooms, leaderboards, and achievements.

== Reception ==
The game has received generally positive reviews. BrightHub.com gave it a 4/5, CNET gave it a 3.5/5 stars, MacWorld gave it a 4.5 out of 5 mice and 148apps.com gave it a 3/5 stars, while calling it "surprisingly entertaining".

Wired.com readers voted The Moron Test as their #2 Favorite App of 2009.

The title has enjoyed success on both platforms; its Android total making it the 9th most popular paid app on Android Market, the iOS release receiving the top spot on the U.S. App Store at launch.
