= Ensemble Girls! =

2012 Japanese video game

- Official cover art for Ensemble Girls!! Memories
- Developer: Happy Elements K. K.
- Platforms: Gree; Android; iOS
- Release: 2012
- Genres: Collectible card game; visual novel

Ensemble Girls! (あんさんぶるガールズ！, Ansanburu Gāruzu!) is a series of Japanese social network games developed by Happy Elements K.K. They are all collectible card games with visual novel elements, mainly written by Japanese novelist Akira. It was first launched as a Gree game in November 2012, as well as being released for Android and iOS devices in 2013. After the original video game ended service 2015, it was renamed Ensemble Girls!! (あんさんぶるガールズ！！, Ansamburu Gāruzu!!) in October 2016. Ensemble Girls!! was planned to end service in November 2017, but postponed to February 2018. Later that year, Happy Elements released an app called Ensemble Girls!! Memories that allows players to browse the story.

== Plot ==
Kimisaki Private Academy is an elite girls' school that planned to become a co-ed school in the upcoming academic year. The player is a second-year middle schoolboy who has just transferred to Kimisaki as the only male student in said school. He enjoys the new school life, helps the girls to solve problems and crisis, and finds out the reason why he transferred to Kimisaki.

== Discography ==
- Ensemble Girls Theme Song: "Let's Make☆Ensemble!" (あんさんぶるガールズ!! テーマソング 『れっつめいく☆あんさんぶる！』, Ansanburu Gāruzu!! Tēma Songu "Rettsu Meiku☆Ansanburu!") by Merry-melody & Misaki (Ayaka Ōhashi, Azusa Tadokoro, and Chinatsu Akasaki))
- "Seinaru kana, Kurokitsuki no Shizuku" (聖ナルカナ、黒キ月ノ雫; Holy Black Moondrop) by Kimisaki Light Music Club (Risa Shimizu, Mikako Komatsu, Megumi Han, and Hisako Kanemoto)

== See also ==
- Ensemble Stars!, a spin-off game featuring male idols.
