= Mikey Boots =

2014 video game

- Developer: BeaverTap Games
- Publisher: Noodlecake Studios (Android)
- Platforms: iOS, Android
- Release: September 4, 2014
- Genre: Platformer

Mikey Boots is an iOS/Android speed-running game released by American indie studio BeaverTap Games on September 4, 2014. It is part of the Mikey series of games, including Mikey Shorts and Mikey Hooks.

== Critical reception ==
Reception

Aggregate score
Aggregator	Score
Metacritic	90/100

Review score
Publication	Score
TouchArcade	5/5

The game has garnered critical acclaim, with a rating of 90/100 on Metacritic based on 6 critic reviews.

TouchArcade said "This is yet another speedrunning masterpiece that everyone ought to own." Apple'N'Apps wrote "Mikey Boots offers an intense, yet fun challenge that will keep you actively engaged, and we enjoyed making it a must have title." Gamezebo said "Mikey Boots is a nice reminder of a time when mobile games weren't aiming to compete toe-to-toe with consoles and PC. When you consider the series is only a few years old, that’s kind of mind-blowing." 148Apps wrote "Mikey Boots is a fine third installment in the excellent Mikey series of platformers." IGN Italia said "Mikey is back with another cool gadget that leads to another great platform game. It's definitely a must have title for the genre." Pocket Gamer wrote "A clever remix of what's come before, Mikey Boots might not be a platformer in the purest sense of the word, but it's definitely worth a look."
