= Hook Worlds =

2010 video game

- Developer: Rocketcat Games
- Publisher: Rocketcat Games
- Designer: Kepa Auwae
- Programmer: Jeremy Orlando
- Artist: Brandon Rhodes
- Series: Hook Champ
- Platforms: iOS, Android
- Release: WW: December 16, 2010; WW: July 2019 (GameClub)
- Genre: Platform
- Mode: Single-player

Hook Worlds, also known as Hook Swing Worlds, is a platform game developed and published by Rocketcat Games for iOS. Released on December 16, 2010, Hook Worlds players levels using a grappling hook. The grappling hook was also present in Hook Worlds' predecessors, Hook Champ and Super QuickHook. Hook Worlds is divided into four worlds: "Curse of the Watcher", "Dungeon Gunner", "CyberGnome 202X", and "Hook Champ 1000". The player controls a different character in each world.

The game was developed by a team of three: Kepa Auwae (design), Jeremy Orlando (programming), and Brandon Rhodes (art). Hook Worlds received "generally favorable" reviews from critics.

== Gameplay ==
Gramps swinging across a forest in the game's first world, "Curse of the Watcher"

Hook Worlds is divided into four worlds, each of which has different gameplay gimmicks and different playing characters. In world one, players play as Theodore "Gramps" Hooker, who has to run away from an evil spirit after his "sacred idol" was stolen. Gramps has a pair of rocket boots that allows him to propel forward when charged. In world two, players play as Zelle from Hook Champ, who has to avoid ghosts, that she can shoot using a revolver. The second world is high score-based and encourages players to collect coins. In world three, players play as Gnomey from Super QuickHook, who has the ability to change gravity. Gnomey has to escape from the Gnome Police, who attempt to capture Gnomey, as it's become illegal to be a gnome. The fourth world has similar gameplay to Hook Champ; players have to escape enemies who chase the player. Like world one, players have a pair of rocket boots in world four. The fourth world is designed to look like a Commodore 64 game.

== Development and release ==
Hook Worlds was developed by American company Rocketcat Games, consisting of Kepa Auwae, Jeremy Orlando, and Brandon Rhodes. Auwae designed the game, Orlando programmed it, and Rhodes was the lead artist. Hook Worlds was developed with the intention of being Rocketcat Games' last 2D platformer to feature a grappling hook, as they wanted to move onto other genres. In an interview with MTV, Auwae stated that inspiration for the game mostly came from other older games, due to them being "full of design lessons, unusual concepts, and cautionary tales." Hook Worlds was designed to be accessible to most players, something Rocketcat Games thought they didn't do with the game's predecessors.

Hook Worlds was announced by Rocketcat Games in September 2010. Hook Worlds later released on December 16, 2010, for iOS. Following its release, multiple updates for the game were released.

The game was removed from the App Store following the iOS 11 update, which removed all 32-bit applications from iOS devices; however, the game was re-released by GameClub on the same platform as a part of their service in July 2019.

== Reception ==
Reception

Aggregate score
Aggregator	Score
Metacritic	83/100

Review scores
Publication	Score
GamePro	8/10
Gamezebo	4/5
Pocket Gamer	3.5/5
TouchArcade	4.5/5
AppSpy	4/5
Slide to Play	3/4

Hook Worlds received "generally favorable reviews" from critics according to review aggregator Metacritic, where it has a score of 83 out of 100, based on 7 reviews. All of the game's worlds were received positively from critics; Jim Squires of GameZebo called the game a "great collection of fun and addictive survival games" and Jared Nelson of TouchArcade felt that the game was "basically 4 complete games in one" and stated that he "[loved] bouncing back and forth through all of them".

In a review for Slide to Play, Andrew Podolsky called the game a "great deal", but wished for more depth. Podolsky felt that the first world was "deliberately easy" and called it a "dull race". Podolsky called the second world a "souped-up" variation of Halfbrick Studios' Monster Dash, stating that he "loved" the second world's set of levels, and noted it as his favorite of the four worlds. The third world was described as a "futuristic running game" and Podolsky called the upside-down swinging was "mind-blowing". For the fourth world, Podolsky felt that it had a "cool art style", but was lacking in gameplay.
