= Fates Forever =

2014 video game

- Developers: Hammer And Chisel, Inc. (now Discord)
- Publishers: Hammer And Chisel, Inc. (now Discord)
- Platform: iPadOS
- Release: July 3, 2014
- Genres: Multiplayer online battle arena and battle royale

Fates Forever was a video game marketed by its developer as the first multiplayer online battle arena (MOBA) game designed exclusively for tablets.

A MOBA game made for the iPad developed by Hammer & Chisel Inc., now Discord, Fates Forever featured 3-vs-3 gameplay, inspired by successful MOBA games like League of Legends and Defense of the Ancients.

== Gameplay ==
There were ten playable characters in Fates Forever at launch, with at least four more planned for post-release. Each character had several special abilities that were unique to the play-style of each player-character.

As of early 2015, there were 14 characters. Fates Forever is no longer available for download or for gameplay. The app and supporting community webpage were disabled in October 2015.

== Release ==
Fates Forever was officially released on iPad worldwide on July 3, 2014, as the first game developed and published by start-up game studio Hammer & Chisel a company founded by former OpenFeint CEO Jason Citron, with the intent to build "great, complex games that don't compromise simply because they're for mobile device".

The game's development staff would later go on to develop Discord, an online VoIP platform designed as a hub for people to chat in.

== Reception ==
Reception

Aggregate score
Aggregator	Score
Metacritic	82/100

The game had a Metacritic score of 82/100 based on 8 critic reviews.
