= Yoshikazu Tanaka =

Japanese entrepreneur

- Born: February 18, 1977
- Citizenship: Japan
- Education: Nihon University
- Occupations: founder of Gree, a Japanese Internet media

Tanaka Yoshikazu (Japanese: 田中 良和, Hepburn: Yoshikazu Tanaka) is a Japanese entrepreneur known for founding and developing the social networking service Gree, provided by Gree, Inc.

Yoshikazu Tanaka was born in Mitaka, Tokyo in 1977. When Tanaka was a junior high school student, Tanaka became keenly interested in changes in society by informatization and the field of information-communication by reading "Power Shift" by Alvin Toffler.

In 2003, at the age 26, Tanaka started developing Gree as a hobby. In February 2004, Tanaka opened Gree to the public, as a personal website. By March 2004, over 10,000 users had joined the service that soon became hard for him to manage rapidly growing service by himself. In December 2004, Tanaka established Gree, Inc. in order to cope the growing number of users.

In December 2008, Gree, Inc. was listed on the Market of the High-Growth and Emerging Stocks, closing at the highest market value of shares on the first day.

In February 2009, Tanaka was ranked 24th among "Japan's 40 Richest Billionaires" by Forbes Asia. As of 2010, at age 33, he was ranked as "Asia's Youngest Self-Made Billionaire" under the age of 35 and was selected as the "World's Second-Youngest Self-Made Billionaire" after Facebook's Mark Zuckerberg.

In June 2010, 5 years after the foundation, Gree was listed on the first section of the Tokyo Stock Exchange. Tanaka was 33 years and 3 month at that time and the youngest founder whose company is listed on the TSE first section.

Tanaka was able to set his social network apart from the well established Japanese brands Mixi and DeNA by concentrating on mobile games and making partnerships with major Internet service providers.
