= Ritmo =

Ritmo (Italian/Spanish for "rhythm") may refer to:

== Automobiles ==
- Fiat Ritmo, a 1978–1988 Italian compact car
- Fiat Bravo, a 2007–2014 Italian compact hatchback, sold in Australia as the Fiat Ritmo

== Music ==
- Ritmo (album), a 1983 album by Judie Tzuke
- "Ritmo" (song), a 2019 song by Black Eyed Peas and J Balvin

== Other uses ==
- Ritmo (typeface), a 1955 typeface developed by Aldo Novarese

== See also ==
- "Ritmu", a 2022 song by Aidan
- Rhythm (disambiguation)
