= Knighthood (2020 video game) =

- Developer: Midoki
- Publisher: King
- Engine: Midoki Development Kit
- Platforms: Android; iOS
- Release: 26 February 2020
- Genres: Turn-based strategy; RPG
- Mode: single-player

Knighthood is a free-to-play, turn-based strategy game developed by Midoki and currently published by Miniclip, previously Phoenix Games and King, in which the player controls a warrior, fighting through levels to gain armour, weapons and other RPG style loot. Knighthood was globally released on February 26, 2020 and is still currently being updated, and has over 5 million downloads on Google Play as of 2023.

== Plot ==
Rage Knights, heroes to the people, once defended the world. Now, it is controlled and corrupted by the power of Dark Ones. Once-good knights have turned evil. Sir Edward Drakeson is recruiting new knights to fight for the knighthood. The player must fight him to test their skills and three more like him for the knight trials. Sir Drakeson and the other three knights fought Lord Karnon, and they lost. The player finds four knights getting attacked and fights Lord Karnon. The player wins the fight, but Karnon activates the portal behind him; Drakeson punches the portal to make it unstable, so it cannot be used properly. Drakeson gets sucked and trapped in the portal, then Karnon jumps inside after him.

== Gameplay ==
Knighthood is a single-player game with some online aspects, in which the player battles enemies to progress through Astellan and claim the Rage Gauntlet. Unlike many other strategy-RPGs, the player has four energy bars; each attack consumes one bar, so the player can switch between using punches from the gauntlet, and attacking with their current weapon. Throughout Knighthood, the player comes across shops and hunts which helps with progression through the game.

== Awards ==
At the beginning of 2021, Knighthood won the Pocket Gamer Award for "Best RPG".
