= Riccardo Zacconi =

Italian businessman

- Born: 11 May 1967 (age 59); Rome, Italy
- Education: Libera Università Internazionale degli Studi Sociali Guido Carli
- Occupations: Businessman; video game developer; management consultant
- Title: CEO & Co-founder, King

Riccardo Zacconi is an Italian businessman, management consultant, and video game developer. He is best known as CEO of King, a video game development company he founded in 2003. King is the developer of the popular mobile game app Candy Crush Saga. On May 26, 2019, Zacconi announced he was stepping down as CEO of King.

== Early life ==
Zacconi was born in 1967 in Rome, Italy. He attended Libera Università Internazionale degli Studi Sociali Guido Carli in Rome from where he graduated in 1993 with a Bachelor's degree in Economics.

== Career ==
After leaving university, Zacconi worked as a consultant. One of his roles during this time included a six-year period as project manager at Boston Consulting Group, between 1993 and 1999. His first career role was as a consultant during a two year long stint at LEK consulting, between 1991 and 1993.

At the start of the dotcom boom in 1999, Zacconi joined the Swedish online messaging startup Spray before it was purchased by Lycos Europe in 2000.

In 2001, he left Spray and moved to the UK as Entrepreneur in Residence for Benchmark Capital until August 2002 when he became vice president of European sales and marketing at Terrence "Lee" Zehrer's uDate. He left this company shortly after its merger with Match.com and in March 2003, he co-founded King, becoming the CEO. He has since grown the company into one of the most successful mobile gaming businesses worldwide.

He said he would remain in the King CEO post until July 1, 2019, but would stay the chairman.

According to the Sunday Times Rich List in 2020, Zacconi is worth an estimated £410 million, an increase of £15 million from the previous year.

== Media profile ==
Zacconi is a leading figure in the UK tech industry and is a proponent of the UK government's efforts to establish a tech city in East London. According to an interview in the Daily Telegraph, he also has a positive reputation in San Francisco as a leading tech figure following a dinner with Mark Zuckerberg. He was reportedly identified as the poster child for Europe's mobile gaming sector. He was knighted by the Italian President in December 2016 with the title of Commendatore dell'Ordine della Stella d'Italia.
