= Gree (Japanese company) =

Japanese Internet media company

GREE Holdings, Inc.
- Native name: グリーホールディングス株式会社
- Type: Public KK
- Traded as: TYO: 3632
- ISIN: JP3274070006
- Industry: Internet
- Founded: Tokyo, Japan (December 7, 2004)
- Founder: Yoshikazu Tanaka
- Headquarters: Roppongi Hills Mori Tower, 6-10-1 Roppongi, Minato, Tokyo, Minato-ku, Tokyo, Japan
- Key people: Yoshikazu Tanaka (田中良和), (Founder and CEO)
- Services: Advertising and Ad network; Licensing and Merchandising; Platform business; Social media; Social gaming; Venture capital; Video game publishing
- Number of employees: ▲1,593 (Group total; as of March 31, 2023)
- Subsidiaries: GREE Entertainment; GREE Studios; WFS, Inc. (Pokelabo); REALITY
- Website: gree.co.jp

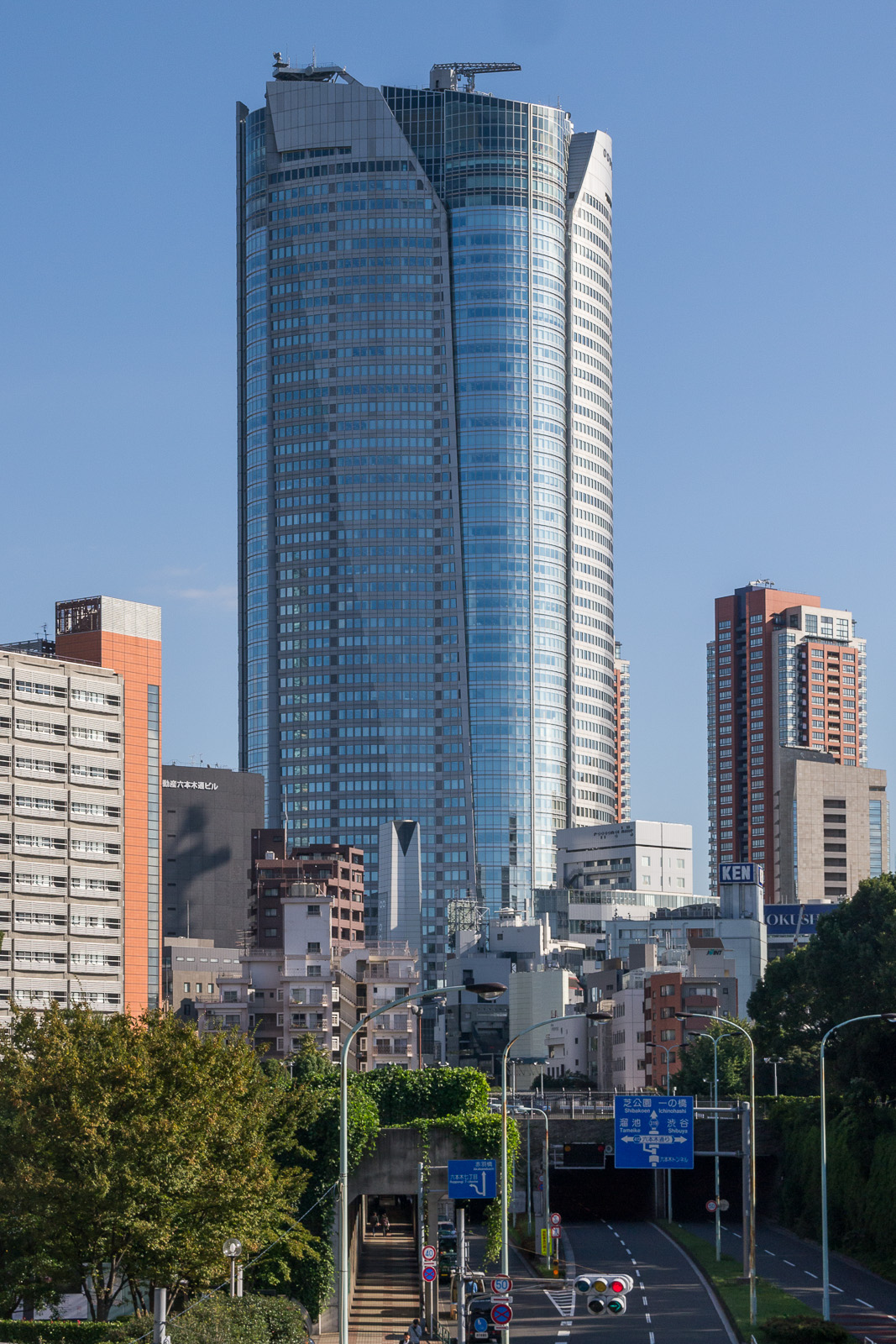
The Roppongi Hills Mori Tower, home to the GREE, Inc. headquarters.

GREE Holdings, Inc. (グリーホールディングス株式会社, Gurī Hōrudingusu Kabushiki-gaisha) is a Japanese social media and video game company with headquarters in the Roppongi Hills Mori Tower in Roppongi, Tokyo. It has been operating the social network service GREE since its establishment in December 2004.

== Etymology ==
The company name GREE comes from a hypothesis, Six Degrees of Separation postulated by social psychologist Stanley Milgram in 1967. "Six degrees of separation" is a hypothesis that everyone is approximately six steps away from any other person on Earth. If a chain of "a friend of a friend" statements are made, on average, any two people in the world can be connected in six steps or fewer. The name symbolizes GREE's hope to "create and provide any new possibilities of the Internet" and to "create new forms of fun, convenience, and excitement."

== History ==
In February, 2004, GREE alpha was released to the public by Yoshikazu Tanaka as a personal hobby. The following month, GREE alpha exceeded 10,000 users, which led to the formal establishment of GREE, Inc on December, 2004. Between 2006 and 2007, the company expanded its reach by launching official mobile services across major Japanese carriers, including KDDI, NTT Docomo, and Softbank. This rapid expansion of the platform accelerated GREE past 1 million users by March 2007. GREE went public on December 2008, listing on the market of the High-Growth and Emerging Stocks.

The platform showed increasing growth over the next 2 years, surpassing 10 million users in April 2009, and 20 million by June 2010. During the same month, GREE opened its platform to third-party developers, allowing third-party application on "GREE Platform." It also moved its headquarters to Roppongi Hills Mori Tower, and was listed on the first section of the Tokyo Stock Exchange. The company began an international expansion starting in 2011, establishing GREE International, Inc. in the United States of America. They also announced a business collaboration with Tencent. GREE completed major acquisitions, purchasing the U.S. social gaming platform OpenFeint for $104 million in April 2011, followed by their purchase of the mobile developer Funzio for $210 million.

== Subsidiaries ==
=== GREE Entertainment ===
GREE Entertainment, Inc., formerly Funplex, is an anime production and video game licensing company. It was formed on July 1, 2021 through a merger of GREE Inc.'s gaming and licensing divisions with Funplex.

=== GREE Studios ===
GREE Studios is a video game development studio founded on November 1, 2024 from a consolidation of WFS and Pokelabo's consumer (console and PC) games business.

=== WFS, Inc. ===
WFS, Inc. (株式会社WFS, Kabushiki-gaisha WFS), formerly Wright Flyer Studios, is a live service game developer and publisher wholly owned by GREE Holdings. It was founded on February 21, 2014 by GREE director Eiji Araki.

Games developed by WFS
Year	Title	Platform(s)	Publisher(s)	Ref.
2014	Shoumetsu Toshi	iOS, Android	GREE	
2017	Another Eden	iOS, Android	Wright Flyer Studios	
2018	Wild Arms: Million Memories	iOS, Android	ForwardWorks	
2019	Fishing Star World Tour	Nintendo Switch	WFS	
2019	Afterlost – Shoumetsu Toshi	iOS, Android	GREE	
2019	Sword Art Online: Unleash Blading (Note: Also known as Sword Art Online: Alicization Rising Steel for the first 2 years of the game.)	Android	Bandai Namco Entertainment	
2022	Heaven Burns Red	iOS, Android, Windows	WFS, Key	
2022	Echoes of Mana	iOS, Android	Square Enix	

=== Pokelabo ===
Pokelabo is a brand of WFS focused on live service game development. Founded in 2007, Pokelabo was acquired by GREE in October 2012 for $173.8 million. On January 1, 2025, Pokelabo was converted from a wholly owned subsidiary of GREE into a video game brand under WFS, with its game development business absorbed by WFS.

Games developed by Pokelabo
Year	Title	Platform(s)	Publisher(s)	Ref.
2017	SINoALICE	iOS, Android	Square Enix	
2021	Assault Lily: Last Bullet	iOS, Android	Bushiroad Games	
2025	Puella Magi Madoka Magica: Magia Exedra	iOS, Android	Aniplex	

=== Reality ===
Reality, Inc. (stylized in all caps), formerly Wright Flyer Live Entertainment, is a live entertainment company specializing in VTubers. Founded by Eiji Araki in April 2018, the company has operated the virtual live streaming app Reality since August 2018.
