= Rythm (software) =

Music streaming service

- Developer: Rythm Inc.
- Platform: Discord

Rythm (pronounced as "rhythm") is a music streaming service created by Yoav Zimet, used to play music in Discord servers.

== History ==
Rythm was first created in 2016 by Yoav Zimet. It was originally a Discord bot which would search Spotify, SoundCloud, and YouTube to stream the music a user requested. After Google started issuing cease and desist letters to music Discord bots, Rythm was sent one for violating YouTube's terms of service and "using it for commercial purposes." Zimet commented that "One way or another we knew this was due to happen eventually." Rythm complied and shut down the bot on September 15, 2021.

Under the auspices of Oliy Barrett, Rythm was re-released on Discord in 2024 with an optional subscription, splitting the profits with record labels and publishers. The company raised capital from Corazon Capital, Mucker Capital, Crush Ventures, Laffitte Management Group, and Black Squirrel Partners. As of 2024, a standalone version of Rythm is being worked on for iOS, Android, and desktop PCs.
