= King (company) =

Video game developer

King.com Limited
- Logo used since 2013
- Trade name: King
- Formerly: Midasplayer.com (2003–2005)
- Type: Subsidiary
- Industry: Video games
- Founded: August 2003; 23 years ago in Stockholm, Sweden
- Founders: Riccardo Zacconi; Toby Rowland; Mel Morris; Thomas Hartwig; Sebastian Knutsson; Lars Markgren; Patrik Stymne
- Headquarters: Stockholm, Sweden; London, England
- Number of locations: 10 studios and offices (2026)
- Area served: Worldwide
- Key people: Todd Green (president)
- Products: Candy Crush Saga
- Number of employees: 2,000 (2017)
- Parent: Activision Blizzard (2016–2026); Xbox (2026–present)
- Website: king.com

King.com Limited is a Swedish video game developer and publisher that specializes in social games. Since 2026, it is one of 5 publishing businesses of Xbox. Headquartered in Stockholm and London, and incorporated in St. Julian's, Malta, King rose to prominence after releasing the cross-platform title Candy Crush Saga in 2012. It is considered as one of the most financially successful games utilizing the freemium model. King was acquired by Activision Blizzard in February 2016 for US$5.9 billion. King is led by President Todd Green. Gerhard Florin took over Melvyn Morris's role as chairman in November 2014. As of 2017, King employed 2,000 people.

In October 2023, Microsoft acquired King's parent company Activision Blizzard, maintaining that the company will continue to operate as a separate business. While part of the larger Xbox division, King continues to develop and publish games internally.

== History ==
=== Founding ===
Prior to founding King, Riccardo Zacconi and Toby Rowland had worked together on uDate.com, a dating website created by Melvyn Morris. Zacconi and Rowland joined with Thomas Hartwig, Sebastian Knutsson, Lars Markgren, and Patrik Stymne, all of whom had worked previously with Zacconi at the failed dot-com web portal Spray, to create a new company with angel investment provided by Morris, who became the company's chairman. Initially based out of Stockholm, the company started developing browser-based video games and launched Midasplayer.com in August 2003.

Initially, Midasplayer.com was not profitable, and it nearly went bankrupt until a cash infusion from Morris on Christmas Eve of 2003. By 2005, the company was able to turn a profit. In that year, the company raised $43 million by selling a large stake to Apax Partners and Index Ventures. This investment was the last one that the company received before its IPO in 2014. Midasplayer.com was rebranded to King.com in November 2005. King.com continued to develop games for its web portal, which it would also share to other web portals like Yahoo! By 2009, the company was making about $60 million annually. Rowland departed the company in 2008, selling his stake back to the company for $3 million in 2011. Angel investor and former board member Klaus Hommels sold his similar stake at the same time.

=== Transition to social gaming ===
Around 2009, social network games on Facebook began to gain popularity, led primarily through games developed by Zynga. King.com saw a significant drop in players on their portal games as a result. They started to develop their own Facebook-based games based on existing King.com games, releasing the first such game in 2010. King.com used their web portal to test new game ideas and determine which ones to bring to Facebook. The company also began implementing various microtransactions for tournament-style play into the Facebook games. In 2011, the company released Miner Speed, a simple match-3 game which was cross-platform, allowing for shared player information between Facebook and the King.com web portal.

Following this model, the company released Bubble Witch Saga to both platforms in October 2011. Bubble Witch Saga was King.com's first "saga" game: instead of playing on the same game board until the player couldn't continue, the game offered individual levels challenging the player to complete certain goals in a limited number of turns. These saga elements allowed for the basics of social gameplay, but did not require the time investment that then-popular titles like Zynga's Farmville required; players could play just for a few minutes each day through the saga model. The formula proved extremely successful, and January 2012, Bubble Witch Saga was one of the most-played Facebook games with over 10 million players. By April 2012, King.com had the second largest player count on the Facebook platform, around 30 million unique users, second only to Zynga. King.com released Candy Crush Saga in April 2012, combining the popularity of its Candy Crush web-portal game and the saga model of Bubble Witch Saga. The game attracted more than 4 million players within a few weeks.

The popularity of Bubble Witch Saga and Candy Crush Saga led King.com to invest in the growing mobile game market in a manner that would allow players to synchronize with the Facebook platform. The company released iOS versions of Bubble Witch Saga and Candy Crush Saga in 2012. Upon the introduction of the mobile versions, both games grew in popularity: previously declining player counts for Bubble Witch Saga steadied, while Candy Crush Saga saw more than 5.2 million unique players on Facebook in November 2012, a number which continued to climb. Additionally, in-game advertising, which accounted for about 15% of King.com's revenue, increased ten-fold from 2011 to 2012. By the end of 2013, King.com's games boasted an active player base of 408 million. These increases resulted in a revenue spike from $62 million in 2011 to $1.88 billion in 2013.

In March 2013, on the tenth anniversary of its founding, the company dropped the ".com" part of its branding and began to be known as just "King". Also in 2013, King acquired the Defold game engine, developed by Ragnar Svensson and Christian Murray in 2007 as a lightweight 2D game engine. The two had offered the engine to King as well as their services as contractors to support it, and later bought the engine, using it first for the game Blossom Blast Saga. In March 2016, King released the Defold engine as a free development tool for any user, and by May 2020, it ceded control of the engine to the Defold Foundation, which made the engine open source with plans to continue to support it with additional investment from King.

=== Initial public offering ===
King filed for an IPO in September 2013, using allowances in the Jumpstart Our Business Startups Act to keep details of the IPO secret until it was offered. The IPO was backed by Bank of America, Merrill Lynch, Credit Suisse Group AG and JPMorgan Chase & Co. The filing was met with interest, as it followed Zynga's $1 billion IPO in 2011 and Twitter's IPO in November 2013.

King completed its IPO on 26 March 2014. Priced at $22.50 a share, the middle of its projected price range, the IPO valued the company at US$7.08 billion. About $500 million was raised through the sale of 22.2 million shares. Of that, 15.3 million shares came from the company and the rest from Apax and other stakeholders. It was the largest ever IPO for a mobile/social gaming company in the US, eclipsing Zynga's 2011 offering. To celebrate the debut, Candy Crush mascots visited the New York Stock Exchange. Morris was the company's largest shareholder with approximately 35.6 million shares valued at $821 million. The company began trading under the "KING" symbol on the New York Stock Exchange.

Shares of King fell 15.6% on the first day of trading, closing at $19. By June, the company's valuation had dropped by $2 billion. Nonetheless, the company remained profitable, generating over $2.6 billion in revenue in 2014, with Candy Crush Saga accounting for nearly half of that amount.

King acquired Seattle-based mobile studio Z2Live in February 2015.

=== Acquisition by Activision Blizzard ===
In November 2015, Activision Blizzard announced its plans to acquire King for $5.9 billion. Upon announcement of the news, USA Today reported that the deal "gives Activision immediate access to the growing mobile gaming audience, the fastest-rising sector in video games". On 23 February 2016, Activision Blizzard closed the deal, acquiring King for $5.9 billion. As a result, Activision Blizzard became the world's largest game network at the time, reaching around 500 million users in 196 countries. About the King acquisition, the CEO of Activision Blizzard explained that "we see great opportunities to create new ways for audiences to experience their favorite franchises, from Candy Crush to World of Warcraft to Call of Duty and more, across mobile devices, consoles and personal computers."

In January 2019, Humam Sakhnini became president of King, reporting directly to Zacconi. As part of a large workforce reduction announced in February 2019 across the whole of Activision Blizzard, King's Z2Live studio in Seattle was shuttered. Zacconi stepped down as CEO on 1 July 2019, remaining as chairman until August 2020, when he left the company entirely. Tjodolf Sommestad, the former chief development officer, replaced Sakhnini in February 2022.

King's mobile site, rebranded from King.com to Royalgames.com, offered paid-entry tournaments for a chance at cash prizes up until 2019, after which this feature was disabled for new accounts. In early 2021, King was forced to withhold payout withdrawals by users over an investigation launched by PayPal, eventually unfreezing accounts in June. King announced in October 2021 that the portal would be shuttered in December in a phased removal of the available games, though players with funds available on the site would be able to continue to withdraw them after the games were removed.

In June 2022, King acquired the Swedish AI company Peltarion.

=== Post Microsoft acquisition ===
In October 2024, King employees in Stockholm voted to form a "union club" (Swedish: Fackklubb) with Unionen, a Swedish trade union. As of 2025, the union has 217 members. A strike scheduled for September 25, 2026 resulted in King's first collective agreement with Unionen and Engineers of Sweden. Employees would be involved before organizational changes happen, including mass dismissals.

In May 2025, King announced that Sommestad would step down as president on June 1, to be succeeded Todd Green, the general manager of the Candy Crush franchise.

In July 2025, Microsoft eliminated 10% of King's total workforce as part of the company's effort to cut 9,000 jobs.

In November 2025, Mojang Studios and King announced Minecraft Blast, a match-three style puzzle game similar to Candy Crush Saga.

In July 2026, Microsoft announced that King would respond directly to CEO Asha Sharma in the Xbox division.

In September 2026, Microsoft Casual Games was transferred from Xbox Game Studios to King.

== Revenue model ==
Prior to June 2013, King earned revenue through a combination of in-game advertising and microtransactions. These microtransactions allow players to purchase in-game booster items to help clear certain levels, additional lives, and immediate access to new levels instead of having to wait for a few days.

In June 2013, King opted to remove all in-game advertising from its games, instead relying solely on microtransactions for revenue. The company stated that due to its "focus around delivering an uninterrupted entertainment experience for our network of loyal players across web, tablet and mobile has unfortunately led to the difficult decision of removing advertising as a core element of King's overall strategy". Microtransactions already made up the bulk of King's revenues: advertising only accounted for 10% of the company's earnings in 2012, and 1% in 2013; King's IPO filings stated that it did not anticipate any further earnings from advertising. While King relies heavily on in-game purchases, those purchases were made by a relatively small number of players. In Q4 2014, 8.3 million of King's 356 million monthly unique users spent money in-game. Players who did make in-game purchases spent an average of $23.42 a month on them. King stated that their model is aimed to continue to draw existing and new players to all of their games: "If the cost to acquire players is greater than the revenue we generate over time from those players and if we cannot successfully migrate our current players to new games and new platforms as we have historically done so, our business and operating results will be harmed".

In 2018, King began to add in-game advertising back into their games.

== Games ==
| Year | Title | Status | Notes | Ref. |
|---|---|---|---|---|
| 2010 | Miner Speed | Discontinued | Discontinued on September 10, 2013. | |
| 2011 | Bubble Saga | Discontinued | Discontinued on September 10, 2013. | |
| 2011 | Puzzle Saga | Discontinued | Discontinued on September 10, 2013. | |
| 2011 | Mahjong Saga | Discontinued | | |
| 2011 | Bubble Witch Saga | Discontinued | Discontinued on October 2, 2020 | |
| 2012 | Hoop de Loop Saga | Discontinued | Discontinued on September 10, 2013. | |
| 2012 | Candy Crush Saga | Available | | |
| 2012 | Pyramid Solitaire Saga | Available | | |
| 2012 | Pet Rescue Saga | Available | | |
| 2013 | Papa Pear Saga | Discontinued | Discontinued on January 14, 2022. | |
| 2013 | Farm Heroes Saga | Available | | |
| 2013 | Pepper Panic Saga | Discontinued | | |
| 2014 | Bubble Witch 2 Saga | Available | | |
| 2014 | Diamond Digger Saga | Discontinued | | |
| 2014 | Candy Crush Soda Saga | Available | | |
| 2015 | AlphaBetty Saga | Discontinued | | |
| 2015 | Scrubby Dubby Saga | Discontinued | | |
| 2015 | Paradise Bay | Discontinued | Discontinued on 17 May 2019. | |
| 2015 | Blossom Blast Saga | Available | | |
| 2016 | Candy Crush Jelly Saga | Available | | |
| 2016 | Farm Heroes Super Saga | Available | | |
| 2016 | Shuffle Cats | Discontinued | | |
| 2017 | Bubble Witch 3 Saga | Available | | |
| 2017 | Legend of Solgard | Discontinued | Developed by Snowprint Studios | |
| 2018 | Royal Charm Slots | Discontinued | | |
| 2018 | Diamond Diaries Saga | Available | | |
| 2018 | Candy Crush Friends Saga | Available | | |
| 2019 | Pet Rescue Puzzle Saga | Discontinued | | |
| 2020 | Knighthood – Epic RPG Knights | Discontinued | | |
| 2021 | Crash Bandicoot: On the Run! | Discontinued | | |
| 2022 | Rebel Riders | Discontinued | | |
| 2025 | Candy Crush Solitaire | Available | | |
| 2026 | Candy Crush Crushable | Available | Browser video game | |
| TBA | Minecraft Blast | In development | Co-developed with Mojang Studios | |

== Controversies ==
=== Trademark dispute ===
In January 2014, King attracted controversy after attempting to trademark the words "Candy" and "Saga" in game titles. This directly impacted Stoic's trademark request for The Banner Saga, to which King filed an opposition, calling the name "deceptively similar" to King games. Stoic said that the dispute hindered work on a planned sequel to their game. On 17 April 2014, it was reported that King has settled its disputes with Stoic Studio and Runsome Apps.

=== Cloning dispute ===
Also in January 2014, game developer Matthew Cox accused King of ripping off his game Scamperghost, arguing that King's Pac-Avoid was a clone of it. According to Cox, he was in talks with King about licensing Scamperghost, but when the deal fell through the company released the game Pac-Avoid. Cox said Epicshadows, the developer of Pac-Avoid, told him that King had approached them to "clone the game very quickly". King removed the game from its website, but denied the cloning allegation, stating that it was removing the game "for the avoidance of doubt".
