= Hook Champ =

2009 video game

- Developer: Rocketcat Games
- Platforms: iOS, Android
- Release: October 4, 2009
- Genre: Platform

Hook Champ is an iOS game developed by American studio Rocketcat Games and released on October 4, 2009. A sequel, Super QuickHook, was released on June 17, 2010, while Hook Worlds was released on December 16, 2010.

== Reception ==
=== Hook Champ ===
Reception

Review score
Publication	Score
TouchArcade	4/5

TouchArcade gave the game 4/5, and wrote "Hook Champ is an absolutely fantastic game that all fans of retro styled sidescrollers should own. It is currently on sale for 99¢ this weekend, which only serves to sweeten the deal. The thread on our forums are filled with enthusiastic and overwhelmingly positive impressions of the game, and Lasharor has some excellent tips for newcomers." IGN gave it 8.5, commenting "Hook Champ is great retro-style platformer. When you get up a real head of steam and fly though the caves (after banking some rope and hook upgrades, of course), Hook Champ borders on zen. You just know when to throw the hook again and keep out of the gaping maw that's giving chase. Developer Rocketcat keeps adding new content through updates, such as additional levels, so Hook Champ has real longevity." Pocket Gamer gave it 8/10, writing "With a superb retro style and a script littered with chuckles aplenty, Hook Champ is largely a joy to play and especially hard to put down, at its best when you're swinging in an almost ape like fashion from the ceiling." Slide To Play said "Hook Champ brings together many elements that we look for in a great game. It has expressive, retro graphics, well-written dialogue full of humor, and an addictive gameplay mechanic." 148Apps gave it 4/5 stars, concluding "This game is exactly what I love about the iPhone. A small time developer has a great simple idea, executes it extremely well and can put it out for me to consume and enjoy. I can't recommend this retro style platformer enough, especially at the price of $2.99. It's the first game I've reviewed here that I think is a must buy. It's too bad this game isn't in the top 100 of games sold on the appstore, because it definitely should be. The game currently has a 4.5 star rating average on the appstore, and it's definitely well deserved." AppSafari gave it 4.5/5 stars, commenting "For only $0.99 Hook Champs is a great value. Counterintuitively, I found the retro-style graphics to be a breath of fresh air. If you are playing on an iPad, iPhone 3G (or later model), or a third generation iPod Touch, loading times should be virtually non-existent. Older iOS devices may experience a bit of lag."

=== Super QuickHook ===
Reception

Aggregate score
Aggregator	Score
Metacritic	96/100

Review score
Publication	Score
TouchArcade	4.5/5

The game has a rating of 96/100 on Metacritic based on 9 critic ratings.

Slide To Play said "Super QuickHook is a worthy sequel to Hook Champ in every way. Don't let our minor quibbles stop you from swinging to the App Store and grappling it up." NoDPad said "I don't know if it's my emphatic love that spills over onto the new game or the fact that the core game was so perfectly carried over into the new game that makes me so thrilled to play. Whatever you want to call it, it's pure magic to me." AppSpy wrote "Prepare yourself for another round of hook-swinging action as Super QuickHook manages to slightly improve on the original title while rewarding players for being even more obsessive than before." 148Apps wrote "Rocketcat Games has refined the foundation that Hook Champ laid down into something truly wonderful with Super QuickHook." GamePro said "Whether it's the exhaustively full-featured leaderboards, gorgeous graphics, or community features, every element of Super QuickHook goes above and beyond what's expected of an indie game release on the App Store." GameZone said "The old-school feel of Super Quickhook is undeniable. It takes the best aspects of games we loved in the 80s and early 90s in a simple, 8-bit format, and puts it on a new device like the iPhone expertly." TouchArcade said "I haven't been this impressed with the evolution of a game of this nature since the original Metroid spawned the phenomenally brilliant Super Metroid." Multiplayer.it wrote "A superb sequel to one of the best games on the iphone, Super QuickHook is a fantastic experience with some great art style." Pocket Gamer said "In spite of the steep difficulty, Super QuickHook is a charming, fun aerial adventure."

=== Hook Worlds ===
Reception

Aggregate score
Aggregator	Score
Metacritic	83/100

Review score
Publication	Score
TouchArcade	4.5/5

The game has a Metacritic score of 83/100 based on 7 critic reviews.

AppSmile wrote "Offering 4 different game modes featuring endless high score runs with the same well-implemented control mechanics we know and love, Hook Worlds further solidifies Rocketcat as the king of swing." 148Apps said "If you've been looking to get into the series but haven't tried it yet, or loved Super QuickHook's endless modes, this is a perfect pickup." TouchArcade said "If you ever felt intimidated by Rocketcat's previous hooking games, or you're already an established hooker looking for a new fix, then you'll want to give Hook Worlds a shot." GamePro said "It's an enjoyable and well-crafted continuation of Rocketcat's series, but Hook Worlds never really innovates beyond the series' token grappling hook gameplay gimmick." AppSpy said "Hook Worlds doesn't feature the same depth as the original titles, however the trade-off is the ability to jump right in to the wonderful endless gameplay with three unique challenges and a fourth super-hard mode to master." Slide To Play said "Hook Worlds is a great collection of endless high-score games, but it's lacking all of the depth of Hook Champ or Super QuickHook." Pocket Gamer said "Despite its steep difficulty curve, Hook Worlds offers up a fun time waster that's worth its pocket money price."
