= Aurora Feint =

- Developers: Danielle Cassley, Jason Citron
- Platform: iOS
- Original release: Beginning: July 7, 2008, II Beginning: December 19, 2008, II Arena: November 21, 2008, II Tower Puzzles: December 18, 2008; 3: April 17, 2010

Aurora Feint was a video game series developed by Danielle Cassley and Jason Citron for iOS. Aurora Feint The Beginning was released in the first wave of App Store applications in July 2008 and was a free single-player game which combines the geometric shape manipulation of Tetris Attack with the character-building aspects of a role-playing game. Aurora Feint II: The Beginning was released in December 2008 and added graphical and community features. Aurora Feint II: The Arena was released in November 2008, adding multiplayer features and was billed by the developers as the first casual asynchronous massively multiplayer online game. Aurora Feint II: Tower Puzzles was released in December 2008 and provided dozens of visual brain teasers based on the "tower" locations in the other titles.

All versions of Aurora Feint have been removed from AppStore since July 14, 2012.

== Gameplay ==
The game mechanics were based on Nintendo's Panel de Pon, and the games in the series shared some similarities including the following components: the Mine, the Store, the Smith, and the Tower. In the Mine, players manipulated blocks into combinations of three or more to collects crystals and resources. In the Store, players spent resources and crystals to acquire blueprints and magicbooks. In the Smith, players completed blueprints by collecting a certain amount of resources within an allotted time, gaining access to new types of weapons. In the Tower, player completed magic books by solving puzzles within an allotted number of moves, gaining improved mining efficiency.

Aurora Feint II: The Arena added a range of additional capabilities including online player v. player dueling, chat capabilities in its "tavern," news feeds, additional character classes, and leaderboards. Characters developed in Aurora Feint The Beginning could be transferred into Aurora Feint II: The Arena.

== Plot ==
Details of the plot and story are limited but text in the game's opening trailer provides some hints:

"What is it that separates reality from fantasy? For one little girl, the only way to survive our reality is to live in her fantasy."

== Development ==
The developers wrote in a forum post and discussed in an interview that the initial release of Aurora Feint The Beginning was created over the course of 10 weeks. Soon after its initial release, reports circulated of privacy concerns regarding the game's community features. According to a forum post by the game's developers, on July 22 Apple removed the game from the iTunes App Store. The developers responded by explaining that the contact list was not actually stored on their server, asking for user feedback on alternatives, and asking for support on bringing the game back to the App Store. On July 24, the iTunes App Store began carrying version 1.0.0.1 of the game. According to the developers, the new version addressed the privacy concerns.

== Reception ==
Aurora Feint The Beginning was met with acclaim compared to other free games in the App Store. One reviewer described it as "the most fun and addictive of the early iPhone games."

Aurora Feint II: The Arena was praised in a preview release for its "Lord of the Rings aesthetic" and for standing apart from other match-three games.
