= Rocket boots =

Soviet mechanical invention

Rocket boots is an invention by Soviet scientist Viktor Gordeyev. The invention is a pair of mechanical devices that a user would wear on his or her lower legs and feet. Rocket Boots are intended to make it possible for a person to travel faster than by unassisted walking or running.

There are no actual rockets in the Rocket Boots. Rather, the power comes from pistons that are filled with a fuel-air mixture, and fired by compression when the user puts his or her full body weight down into the boot. When the piston fires, the platform under the user's foot pushes down on the ground, launching the user forward toward the next step in an action similar to that of pogo stick. The boots use approximately 4 cc fuel per 6.2 miles (10 km).

The boots were initially developed in the 1970s for the Soviet Army, but development was suspended until 2000. The project was restarted in Russian Federation by scientists at the Bashkir State University (Ufa), with the aim to develop a product for the civilian and a military markets.

It is expected that while using the "rocket boots", a person could travel at an average speed of around 10.5 mph (16.89 km/h). However, it is thought that the highest speed for an experienced user is around 22 mph (35.4 km/h).

== See also ==
- Powerbocking
- Seven-league boots
