= Candy Crush Saga =

2012 video game

- Developer: King
- Publisher: King
- Platforms: App Store; Google Play; Windows Phone Store; Windows; macOS; Linux
- Release: Browser; April 12, 2012 iOS; November 14, 2012; Android; December 14, 2012; Fire OS; December 11, 2014; Windows Phone; September 6, 2012; Windows; July 29, 2015
- Genre: Match-three

Candy Crush Saga is a free-to-play match-three video game released by King on April 12, 2012, originally for Facebook; other versions for iOS, Android, Windows Phone, and Windows 10 followed. It is a variation of their browser game Candy Crush.

In the game, players complete levels by swapping colored pieces of candy on a game board to make a match of three or more of the same color, eliminating those candies from the board and replacing them with new ones, which could potentially create further matches. Matches of four or more candies create unique candies that act as power-ups with larger board-clearing abilities. Boards have various goals that must be completed within a fixed number of moves, such as collecting a specific number of a type of candy.

The game uses a freemium model; while it can be played completely through without spending money, players can buy special actions to help clear more difficult boards, from which King makes its revenues—at its peak, the company was reportedly earning almost $1 million per day. Around 2014, over 93 million people were playing Candy Crush Saga, while revenue over a three-month period as reported by King was over $493 million. Five years after its release on mobile, the Candy Crush Saga series has received over 2.7 billion downloads, and the game has been one of the highest-grossing and most-played mobile apps in that time frame. As of September 2023, it had reached over $20 billion in lifetime revenue, making it one of the highest-grossing media franchises of all time.

King has since released three related titles—Candy Crush Soda Saga, Candy Crush Jelly Saga and Candy Crush Friends Saga—and most of the company's other mobile titles follow the same Saga freemium format.

== Gameplay ==
Gameplay on iOS, with candy, striped candies, jelly, licorice lock, and chocolate

Candy Crush Saga is a match-three video game, where the core gameplay is based on swapping two adjacent candies among several on the gameboard to make a row or column of at least three matching-colored candies. On this match, the matched candies are removed from the board, and candies above them fall into the empty spaces, with new candies appearing from the top of the board. This may create a new matched set of candies, which is automatically cleared in the same manner. The player scores points for these matches and gains progressively more points for chain reactions (called cascades). Additionally, creating matches of four or more candies will create a special candy that, when matched, can clear a row, column, or other section of the board.

The game is split into many levels, which must be completed in sequence. Each level poses a different challenge to the user, such as removing jelly on tiles or clearing candies in a fixed number of moves to bring special ingredients to the bottom of the board. Boards have a number of different configurations and may include special spaces that have their own unique rules, such as spaces covered with jelly that must be cleared by making a match on that space. If the player meets the level's goal, they will be given stars based on their score and can proceed onto the next level. Otherwise, they will lose one life and must try again. If the player runs out of lives, they have to wait for some period of real-world time while their lives regenerate before attempting the level again. Completed levels can be replayed if desired.

The game has been expanded with a number of episodes, adding 15 new levels per episode as well as new gameplay mechanics. Each episode has 15 levels of gameplay. In the game's first major expansion, the game added a separate set of levels in the Dreamworld. While levels had the same goals, the players had to balance matches of candies of two randomly selected colors to prevent Odus the Owl from waking up; if they failed, the level had to be repeated. If they collected enough matched candies to fill a meter, the game would automatically activate the Moon Struck power: the board was cleared of all candies of those two colors, and the player gained a few turns of additional matches without needing to balance colors. After this, Odus returned to sleeping and two new colors were randomly selected for the balance. This continued until the player completed the level or ran out of turns as in the main game. Dreamworld levels used a different set of lives from the main game, allowing the player to switch back and forth between these modes. The Dreamworld is no longer accessible.

=== In-app purchases ===
The game is primarily monetized through in-app purchases (through either a credit card, iTunes credits or Google Play credits); players begin with five "lives", lost whenever a level is failed. This applies to all of King's games. When lives are exhausted, users can either send requests to their Facebook friends for more lives, wait for them to replenish themselves (a life is restored every half-hour), or purchase them. Initially, when a player makes a purchase for new lives, they receive five new lives for a specific dollar amount. In a recent update, when a player makes a purchase for new lives, the player receives gold bars, the quantity depending on how much money they spend. Gold bars can be used for new lives, extra moves, boosters or to unlock a new episode. At certain points, primarily at the start of new "episodes", users must also either purchase or receive a request from at least three friends before they may access the next set of levels. An update meant players waited for only three days to unlock the next episode.

Boosters, to make the levels easier, can be bought using in-app purchases. While the game includes freemium content, 97.7% of those playing the game do so for free, while only 2.3% pay.

== Characters ==
Throughout the game, the player solves puzzles so Tiffi (short for Toffette) can solve problems plaguing the residents of the Candy Kingdom. These include tutorial guide Mr. Toffee, whose voice was changed from an over-the-top French accent in the original version of the game into a more modest deep male voice; the Easter Bunny; the shop owner Mr. Yeti; Odus the owl from Dreamworld levels; the villainous Bubblegum Troll; and many others.

In Candy Crush Jelly Saga, the two main characters that the player plays against are the Jelly Queen and Cupcake Carl.

== Development ==
Prior to the release of Candy Crush Saga, most of King's games were browser games offered through their website or partner portals such as Yahoo!. This included Candy Crush, a straightforward tile-matching game released in 2011 which King's chief creative officer and co-founder Sebastian Knutsson said came after a few hundred other games they had designed for the portal. Candy Crush's concept had been based on an early game King made, Miner Speed, that borrowed gameplay elements from Bejeweled. Candy Crush added new animations for the candies, and expressive paper doll-like characters that helped to make the game one of five most popular ones on the site by 2012. At that point, the game was a basic score attack game. Knutsson said, "the first version was three minutes of great gaming, but that three minutes didn't really evolve." Candy Crush, as with several of King's other portal games, featured tournament-style gameplay, where players could spend money to enter competitive tourneys for in-game boosts, which served as one of the main forms of revenue for the company in addition to in-game item sale microtransactions and advertisements.

Around 2009, Facebook began to pull in developers, in particular Zynga, to offer social network games that could be built on its fundamental services; for King, this resulted in a large drop in players at their game portals within a year. At this point, King started to determine how it could enter the Facebook and the associated mobile game markets, breaking up its web development department to work on Facebook and mobile games in 2010, including bringing several of their existing browser games to those platforms. Most of these existing games were introduced as beta versions to Facebook users, and the company used player counts and feedback to determine which of these titles had the most prospect for moving forward, allowing them to focus more intensive development on those titles while dropping the rest, in the style of a rapid prototyping approach. The Facebook platform allowed them to explore expansion of their existing tournament-style games and the ability to include microtransactions within the game.

In April 2011, King released its existing portal game Miner Speed as its first cross-platform (Facebook and mobile) game to figure out the transition between Facebook and mobile games for this new direction. King's first major success in this area followed with Bubble Witch Saga, released in October 2011; by January 2012 it has attracted over 10 million players and was one of fastest rising Facebook games at that time. Bubble Witch Saga introduced the "saga" approach in contrast to typical tile-matching games, where instead of having the game continue through a fixed amount of time or until the player reached an unplayable state, the game was divided into discrete levels that required the player to complete certain goals within a fixed set of moves, and where the next level could only be reached after completing the previous level. These saga elements allowed for the basics of social gameplay, but did not require the time investment that then-popular titles like Zynga's FarmVille required; players could play just for a few minutes each day through the saga model. The success of Bubble Witch Saga establishing King as a viable developer in this arena, becoming the second-largest developer by daily player count on the Facebook platform by April 2012, trailing only Zynga.

Candy Crush Saga was selected as King's next Facebook game based on the popularity of the portal version of Candy Crush. The basic cross-platform framework from Miner Speed were used to craft the foundation of Candy Crush Saga, adding the "saga" elements from Bubble Witch Saga. Initial ideas to expand Candy Crush into Candy Crush Saga were proposed by Knutsson, around 2011, including making the saga map visually look like a board game. The game was first released for Facebook in April 2012, at the time featuring only 65 levels. The game quickly gained popularity, gaining more than 4 million players within a few weeks of release.

King later released mobile versions for iOS and Android that same year, adding a feature that allowed mobile users to synchronize their progress with the Facebook version. Knutsson stated that at that time, with Candy Crush Saga as popular as it was on Facebook, they knew that they "had to get it right" in the transition process. King had previously discussed the nature of games that kept their state between a PC and mobile version with Fabrication Games, believing this was a necessary trend in the future of gaming, Both recognized several of the difficulties that would have to be addressed to provide both the progress synchronization and gameplay interface between mouse-driven PC computers and touch-driven mobile devices. King found that one issue with transiting Bubble Witch Saga to mobile was that the gameplay elements were too small for mobile devices, and aimed to correct that for Candy Crush Saga on mobile. The mobile release delay for Candy Crush Saga was in part due to adding the ability to play the mobile version in an offline mode that would still synchronize once the player returned online.

The mobile version helped to boost the popularity of the game, attributed to the nature of the game being able to be played in a pick-up-and-go manner ideally suited for mobile devices. Tommy Palm, one of the four developers for Candy Crush Saga, stated that the first weekend numbers after the game's mobile release were over ten times greater than the estimates they expected. By January 2013, Candy Crush Saga overtook Zynga's FarmVille 2 as the top-played game on the Facebook platform.

King had not planned for Candy Crush Saga to be as popular as it was, expecting the game to have only a six-month window after which players would move on to a different game, and thus had committed only minimal resources to its ongoing support at launch. Instead, with the game's popularity still high by the end of 2012, King became more serious about supporting the game for the long term, looking into deeper game mechanics, adding more levels, and other methods to extend the game. Since its release, Candy Crush Saga was expanded over the years by adding new episodes, each containing a number of new levels. This enabled King to also introduce new gameplay features alongside other game improvements. New features were first tested on King's own portal to see how players there responded and allowed them to tweak these as needed, then push them into the episodes on the Facebook/mobile version. By September 2016, King released its 2000th level for the game to celebrate the milestone of over 1 trillion Candy Crush Saga games having been played. Starting around that time, with the game offered as a free-to-play model, King seeks to provide new content on a weekly or biweekly basis, including time-limited content. Zacconi saw this approach as a means to keep players, who otherwise have not purchased anything, to keep coming back and playing the game.

In March 2025, Candy Crush Soda Saga was included in the 14.1 beta of Android Auto, as part of the Android Auto testing program. The game was already available on cars with Android Automotive, and could be played on the 14.1 beta when the car was in park.

== Reception ==
Reception

Aggregate score
Aggregator	Score
Metacritic	iOS: 79/100

According to review aggregator website Metacritic, the game received an average review score of 79/100, indicating "generally favorable" reviews. Ellie Gibson of Eurogamer referred to Candy Crush Saga as one of 2013's Games of the Year.

=== Commercial ===
By 2013, Candy Crush Saga had been downloaded more than 500 million times across Facebook, iOS, and Android devices. It was considered the most downloaded app from the Apple App Store, and had at least 6.7 million active users on a daily basis; the game had a daily revenue of $633,000 from the United States section of the iOS App Store alone. By 2014, the game had over 245 million active players each month but has since dropped off, with that count falling to around 166 million by 2016. It again rose back to 293 million active monthly players by November 2017.

Though initially released with advertising to help with revenue, King removed the advertising in 2013 and solely has earned money from the game in the form of in-app purchases. Only a small percentage of the player base has purchased in-game items, up to around 4%, but this has led to millions of dollars in monthly revenue for King. In 2014, Candy Crush Saga players spent over $1.33 billion on in-app purchases. This is a decline from the previous year since in the second half of 2013 players spent over $1.04 billion. By 2015, the monthly revenue was estimated at $120 million, but with declining players purchasing in-game items, down to 2% by 2016, that revenue has dropped to just over $53 million per month. Again, by the end of October 2018, the monthly revenue rose to $128 million.

Five years after its release on mobile, the Candy Crush Saga series has received over 2.73 billion downloads. Its revenue for the quarter ending September 2017 was $250 million, having gained significant improvement in year-to-year revenues from 2016. It remains one of the top gross-revenue earnings app for mobile in the four years leading up to 2017. By the end of July 2018, the total revenue earned by this game stood at $3.91 billion.

Candy Crush received particular mention in Hong Kong media, with reports that one in seven Hong Kong citizens plays the game. In December 2013, King entered the Japanese market with a series of television commercials in Japan, and by December 4 it had become the 23rd most downloaded game in Japan on Android devices and number 1 most downloaded from the App Store. It is also the most popular game in the UK of all time.

Starting in 2020, King has hosted an online and in-person tournament, called Candy Crush All Stars, with a $1 million prize pool, of which $500,000 goes to the tournament winner. In 2024, 15 million players competed, with in-person finals held in Los Angeles.

=== Player demographics ===
58% of the players are women, while 46% of the players are of Gen X, though more youths and children play it.

=== Awards ===
Candy Crush Saga won the People's Choice Awards for Favorite Mobile Game 2016. Other nominees were Fruit Ninja, Despicable Me: Minion Rush, Plants vs. Zombies and Temple Run. It was also the winner of 9th International Mobile Gaming Awards for the Best Social Game.

== Controversy ==
King filed for applications for trademarks on the word "candy" in January 2013 with the United States Patent and Trademark Office (USPTO), which became publicly known in January 2014. News of these pending trademarks raised concerns from other developers, who feared that King would use their trademark to intimidate smaller developers. In response to this criticism, King decided not to pursue the trademark.

The mobile game known as CandySwipe created in 2010, two years prior to the release of Candy Crush Saga, had many similarities that its independent developer Albert Ransom noticed as Candy Crush Saga became more successful. Following news of the "candy" trademark, Ransom issued a statement in February 2014, claiming that King had intentionally copied elements from his own game including the app icon, the art for the candy pieces, and sound effects like the level-completion "Sweet!". While details were not given, Ransom stated that he had "amicably" resolved the matter with King by April of that year.

During this same period, it was discovered that King had applied for a trademark on the word "saga", and they had taken action against Stoic, the developers of The Banner Saga; King had attempted to block Stoic's registration of "The Banner Saga", and after the game released in January 2014, it issued a cease and desist letter to the developers (King's trademark application was still pending approval at this time). Similar to the CandySwipe situation, Stoic announced in April 2014 that the situation with King had been resolved with both sides coming to an agreement allowing Stoic to continue to use their name.

Candy Crush Saga also received criticism when it struck a deal with Microsoft to automatically install/reinstall the game on all new computers with then latest Windows operating system and already sold devices that had been upgraded to Windows 10 Home, even before Microsoft acquired King's parent company Activision Blizzard in October 2023.

Candy Crush Saga is considered to be an addictive game as it uses a compulsion loop that provides pleasurable reinforcement the more one plays. The game was investigated by the UK Office of Fair Trading concerning exploitative game mechanics with regards to younger users.

== Sequels ==
In May 2014, a sequel titled Candy Crush Soda Saga was soft launched by King, with a similar design but new gameplay dynamics, such as a soda bottle piece that can shift gravity.

On October 20, 2014, the Facebook version of Candy Crush Soda Saga was released worldwide and the mobile app was released in November on the Android and iOS platforms. The app was subsequently made available for Windows 10 and Windows Phone in October 2015. Among other gameplay changes, Candy Crush Soda Saga introduces soda candies that release soda that fill the puzzle board from the bottom up, causing candies to float up to the highest soda level.

In September 2015, another sequel named Candy Crush Jelly Saga was soft-launched in various countries for the Android platform, followed by a worldwide release in January 2016. Initially it was not made available on Facebook unlike previous titles but was released on Android and iOS in May 2016. The Facebook version appears to no longer require Adobe Flash to play. The game introduces jelly-filled squares. Matches made with candies occupying jelly-filled squares will generally cause all squares that were part of the match to become jelly-filled, with the goal of making all squares on the gameboard filled with jelly to complete the puzzle.

A third sequel, Candy Crush Friends Saga, was released on both iOS and Android in October 2018. Prior to each round, the player may have the ability to select one of the series' characters to assist with the puzzle. Each character has a power that activates after a certain number of candies of a specific color are collected, such as converting a candy on the board to a wrapped candy. This game earned $5.6 million in its first month, and $10 million by June 2019.

== Television show ==
CBS produced a live-action Candy Crush game show in partnership with King that premiered on July 9, 2017. It was an hour-long competition among several two-person teams using interactive games that are based on Candy Crush. The show was produced by Lionsgate with executive producer Matt Kunitz, and with collaboration by Sebastian Knutsson, the creative developer of the first Candy Crush game. Mario Lopez hosted the show.

Four teams play in each episode doing various challenges based on the Candy Crush game, with the winning team earning a guaranteed $100,000.

== In popular culture ==
The game is featured in Psy's music video "Gentleman". Part of The Emoji Movie takes place within Candy Crush Saga.

Candy Crush Saga was used as a challenge theme for an episode of the sixth season of Project Runway All Stars. In February 2025, make-up artist Pat McGrath launched a cosmetics line based on the game, called Pat McGrath Labs x Candy Crush Saga, which featured lipstick and nail polish in colors and packagings inspired by Candy Crush Saga.
