= Gree (social network) =

Japanese social networking service

GREE
- Owner: GREE Holdings, Inc.
- Creator: Yoshikazu Tanaka
- Website: gree.jp
- Launched: February 2004; 22 years ago

GREE is a Japanese social networking service founded by Yoshikazu Tanaka and operated by GREE Holdings, Inc. While GREE was initially available only to PC users, the service was later extended to feature phone users. GREE for feature phones includes regular social networking functions, social games, flash-based games, blogs, fortune telling, news and so forth.

The source of earnings is mainly composed of advertisement sales and paid services sales.

== History ==
In 2010, GREE, Inc. started GREE for iPhone and Android to meet demand. GREE, Inc. provides a variety of social game applications for feature phones and smartphones, with enhanced communication among users.

== Content ==
GREE focuses primarily on mobile games and over ninety percent of its users access the site via their mobile phones. The company makes money by selling virtual goods to users such as clothes for their in-game avatars.

Social networking features of GREE include the user profile, diary, communities, photo sharing and photo emailing. It serves as a platform for promoting communication and mutual understanding among its members.

== Etymology ==
The service name GREE comes from a hypothesis, Six Degrees of Separation postulated by social psychologist Stanley Milgram in 1967. Six degrees of separation is a hypothesis that everyone is at most six steps away from any other person on Earth. If a chain of a friend of a friend statements are made, any two people in the world can be connected in six steps or fewer. The name symbolizes GREE’s hope to create and provide any new possibilities of the Internet.

== See also ==
- Ensemble Girls!
