= List of DreamWorks Animation video games =

There have been several licensed video games based on the DreamWorks Animation properties. They have been released on many different platforms, including Game Boy Advance, Microsoft Windows, PlayStation, PlayStation 2, PlayStation 3, PlayStation 4, PlayStation 5, PlayStation Portable, Xbox 360, Wii, and mobile devices.

== Games ==
Title	Release date	Platform	Developer	Publisher
Antz	September 24, 1999	Game Boy Color	Planet Interactive	Infogrames
Toonsylvania	2000	Game Boy Color	RFX Interactive and released by Light & Shadow	Ubi Soft
Gold and Glory: The Road to El Dorado	2000	Game Boy Color	Planet Interactive	Ubi Soft; Light & Shadow Production
Gold and Glory: The Road to El Dorado	2000	Microsoft Windows, PlayStation	Revolution Software	Ubi Soft; Light & Shadow Production
Chicken Run	2000	PlayStation, Dreamcast, Windows	Blitz Games	Eidos Interactive
Chicken Run	2000	Game Boy Color	Blitz Games	THQ
Chicken Run	2000	Dedicated handheld	Tiger Electronics, Ltd	Tiger Electronics, Ltd
Antz Racing	2001	Game Boy Color	RFX Interactive	Light and Shadow Production / Club Acclaim / Electronic Arts
Antz World Sportz	November 30, 2001	Game Boy Color	M4 Ltd.	Light and Shadow Production
Antz: Panic in the Anthill!	2001	Windows	Light & Shadow Production	Light & Shadow Production
Spirit: Stallion of the Cimarron — Forever Free	2002	Windows	The Fizz Factor	THQ
Spirit: Stallion of the Cimarron — Search for Homeland	2002	Game Boy Advance	Hyperspace Cowgirls	THQ
Antz Extreme Racing	August 28, 2002; September 5, 2002; September 19, 2002	Microsoft Windows; Xbox; PlayStation 2	Supersonic Software	Empire Interactive
Antz Extreme Racing	November 20, 2002	Game Boy Advance	Magic Pockets	Empire Interactive
Shrek: Fairy Tale Freakdown	2001	Game Boy Color	Prolific Publishing, Inc.	TDK Mediactive, Inc.
Shrek Game Land Activity Center	2001	Windows	Activision Value Publishing, Inc.	ImageBuilder Software, Inc.
Shrek	2001	Xbox, GameCube	TDK Mediactive, Inc.	Digital Illusions Canada, Inc.
Shrek Swamp Kart Speedway	2002	Game Boy Advance	TDK Mediactive, Inc.	Prolific Publishing, Inc.
Shrek: Hassle at the Castle	2002	Game Boy Advance	TDK Mediactive, Inc.	Tose Co., Ltd.
Shrek: Swamp Fun with Phonics	2002	Windows	Activision Value Publishing, Inc.	ImageBuilder Software, Inc.
Shrek: Swamp Fun with Early Math	2002	Windows	Activision Value Publishing, Inc.	ImageBuilder Software, Inc.
Shrek: Treasure Hunt	2002	PlayStation	Code Monkeys Ltd.	TDK Mediactive, Inc.
Shrek Super Party	2002	Xbox, GameCube, and PlayStation 2	TDK Mediactive, Inc.	Mass Media
Shrek 2	2004	GameCube, PlayStation 2, Xbox, and J2ME	Luxoflux Corp.	Activision
Shrek 2	2004	Game Boy Advance	Vicarious Visions	Activision
Shrek: Reekin' Havoc	2003	Game Boy Advance	TDK Mediactive, Inc.	Tose Co., Ltd.
Shark Tale	2004	Game Boy Advance	Vicarious Visions	Activison
Shark Tale	2004	GameCube; Microsoft Windows; PlayStation 2 Xbox	Edge of Reality, Ltd.	Activision
Shark Tale	2004	Microsoft Windows	KnowWonder, Inc.	Activision
Shark Tale Fintastic Fun!	2004	Microsoft Windows	Santa Cruz Games	Activision
Sinbad: Legend of the Seven Seas	2003	Microsoft Windows	Small Rockets	Atari
Shrek 2 Activity Center: Twisted Fairy Tale Fun	2004	Windows	AWE	Activision
Shrek 2: Ogre Bowler	2004	Windows	WildTangent	Dreamworks Games
Shrek 2: Team Action	2004	Windows	Activision	KnowWonder, Inc.
Shrek 2: Beg for Mercy	2004	Game Boy Advance	Vicaious Visions	Activision
Shrek 2: Trivia	2004	J2ME		
Shrek 2: Castle Run	2004	J2ME		
Shrek SuperSlam	2005	PlayStation 2, Xbox, GameCube, and Windows	Shaba Games	Activision
Madagascar	2005	Leapster	Leapfrog	Leapfrog
Madagascar: Paint & Create	2005	Windows	Alternative Software Ltd.	Global Software Publishing Ltd.
Madagascar	2005	GameCube, Microsoft Windows, PlayStation 2, Xbox	Toys for Bob	Activision
Madagascar	2005	Nintendo DS, Game Boy Advance	Vicarious Visions	Activision
Madagascar: Operation Penguin	2005	Game Boy Advance	Vicarious Visions	Activision
Madagascar: Animal Trivia DVD Game	2005	DVD		
Wallace & Gromit: The Curse of the Were-Rabbit	2005	PlayStation 2, Xbox, Mobile Phone	Frontier Developments	Konami
Wallace & Gromit: The Curse of the Were-Rabbit	2005	Mobile Phone	Frontier Developments	Konami
Shrek SuperSlam	2005	Nintendo DS	Amaze Entertainment	Activision
Shrek SuperSlam	2005	Game Boy Advance	Amaze Entertainment	Activision
Shrek: Fiona's Rescue	2005	Sky Gamestar		
Shrek: Disarming Charming	2005	Sky Gamestar		
Shrek: Fairy Godmother's Revenge	2005	Sky Gamestar		
Shrek 2: The Adventure of Puss in Boots	2005	J2ME		
Shrek: Double Trouble	2006	Sky Gamestar		
Over the Hedge	2006	GameCube, Microsoft Windows, PlayStation 2, Xbox	Edge of Reality; Beenox	Activision
Over the Hedge	2006	Game Boy Advance	Vicarious Visions	Activision
Over the Hedge	2006	Nintendo DS	Vicarious Visions	Activision
Over the Hedge: Hammy Goes Nuts!	2006	Game Boy Advance	Vicarious Visions	Activision
Over the Hedge: Hammy Goes Nuts!	2006	Nintendo DS	Amaze Entertainment	Activistion
Over the Hedge: Hammy Goes Nuts!	2006	PSP	Amaze Entertainment	Activision
Shrek: Imperial Peril	2006	Sky Gamestar		
Shrek Smash n' Crash Racing	2006	GameCube, PlayStation 2, and PlayStation Portable,	Torus Games	Activision
Flushed Away	2006	PlayStation 2, GameCube	Monkey Bar Games	D3 Publisher
Flushed Away	2006	Game Boy Advance	Altron	D3 Publisher
Flushed Away	2006	DS	Art Co., Ltd	D3 Publisher
Shrek: Dragon's Tale	2006	V.Smile		
Bee Movie Game	2007	Xbox 360, Wii, Nintendo DS, PlayStation 2, Windows	Beenox; Smart Bomb Interactive	Activision
Bee Movie Game	2007	Nintendo DS	Vicarious Visions	Activision
Madagascar: Escape 2 Africa	2008	PlayStation 3, Xbox 360, Wii, Microsoft Windows, PlayStation 2	Toys For Bob	Activision
Madagascar: Escape 2 Africa	2008	Nintendo DS	Griptionite	Activision
Kung Fu Panda	2008	Microsoft Windows, PlayStation 2, PlayStation 3, Wii, Xbox 360, J2ME, Mac OS X	Luxoflux	Activison
Kung Fu Panda: Path of the Panda	2008	V.Smile	VTech	VTech
Kung Fu Panda	2008	Nintendo DS	Luxoflux	Activision
Kung Fu Panda: Legendary Warriors	2008	Wii	Artificial Mind and Movement	Activision
Kung Fu Panda: Legendary Warriors	2008	Nintendo DS	Artificial Mind and Movement	Activision
Madagascar Kartz	2009	PlayStation 3, Wii, Xbox 360	Sidhe Interactive	Activision
Madagascar Kart	2009	Nintendo DS	Virtous	Activision
Monsters vs Aliens	2009	PlayStation 3, Wii, Xbox 360	Beenox	Activision
Monsters vs Aliens	2009	Nintendo DS	Griptionite	Activision
The Penguins of Madagascar	2010	Nintendo DS	Griptionite	THQ
Kung Fu Panda World	2010	browser	HumaNature Studios	DreamWorks Animation
Shrek Forever After	2010	V.Smile	VTech	VTech
Megamind: Ultimate Showdown	2010	Xbox 360, PlayStation 3	THQ Studio Australia	THQ
Megamind: Mega Team Unite	2010	Wii	THQ Studio Australia	THQ
Megamind: The Blue Defender	2010	PSP, DS	Tantalus Media	THQ
Shrek the Third: Arthur's School Day Adventure	2007	V.Smile	VTech	VTech
Shrek the Third: The Search for Arthur	2007	V.Flash	VTech Electronics North America, L.L.C.	VTech Electronics North America, L.L.C.
Shrek Smash n' Crash Racing	2006	Nintendo DS and Game Boy Advance	Trous Games	Activision
How to Train Your Dragon	2010	Wii, PlayStation 3, Xbox 360	Etranges	Activision
How to Train Your Dragon	2010	Nintendo DS	Griptonite	Activision
Dragons: TapDragonDrop	2012	iPhone	PikPok	DreamWorks Animation SKG
Rise of the Guardians: The Video Game	2012	PlayStation 3, Xbox 360, Wii, Wii U, Nintendo DS, Nintendo 3DS	Torus	D3
Dragons: Wild Skies	2012	browser		
School of Dragons	2013	iPad	Jumpstart Games, Inc.	Jumpstart Games, Inc.
The Croods: Prehistoric Party!	2013	Nintendo 3DS, Nintendo DS	Torus	D3
The Croods: Prehistoric Party!	2013	Wii U, Wii	Torus	D3
The Croods	2013	IOS	Rovio	Rovio
Turbo: Super Stunt Squad	2013	Nintendo 3DS, Nintendo DS	Torus Games	D3
Turbo: Super Stunt Squad	2013	Wii U, Wii, PlayStation 3, Xbox 360	Monkey Bar Games	D3
Turbo Racing League	2013	IOS		
Dragons Adventure	2013	Nokia Lumia 2520		
Dragons: Rise of Berk	2014	Android	Ludia, Inc.	Ludia, Inc.
How to Train Your Dragon 2	2014	Xbox 360, Nintendo 3DS, Wii, Wii U and PlayStation 3	Torus Games	Little Orbit
Dragons: Titan Uprising	2018	IOS, Android	Ludia	Ludia, Inc.
Dragons: Dawn of New Riders	2019	Xbox One, PlayStation 4, Nintendo Switch, PC	Climax	Outright
Dragons: Legends of the Nine Realms	2022	Xbox One, PlayStation 4, Nintendo Switch, PC	Aheartfullofgames	Outright
Shrek the Third	2007	Xbox 360, Windows, Wii, PlayStation 2, PlayStation Portable, and J2ME	Amaze	Activision
Shrek the Third	2007	Nintendo DS	Vicarious Visions	Activision
Shrek the Third	2007	Game Boy Advance	Vicarious Visions	Activision
Shrek Jumble Rumble	2007	Sky Gamestar		
Shrek n' Roll	2007	Xbox Live Arcade	Backbone Entertainment, Inc.	Activision
Shrek the Third	2007	Sky Gamestar		
Shrek: Ogres & Dronkeys	2007	Nintendo DS	WayForward	Activision
Shrek's Carnival Craze	2008	PlayStation 2, Windows, and Wii	Ivolgamus UAB	Activision
Shrek's Carnival Craze	2008	Nintendo DS	Ivolgamus UAB	Activision
Shrek Party	2008	J2ME		
Shrek Kart	2009	iOS, Android, Palm Pre	Gameloft Srl	Gameloft S.A.
Shrek Forever After	2010	Xbox 360, Windows, Wii, PlayStation 3, iOS and J2ME	XPEC Entertainment Inc.	Activision
Shrek Forever After	2010	Nintendo DS	Griptonite, Inc.	Activision
DreamWorks Super Star Kartz	2011	Xbox 360, Wii, PlayStation 3, Nintendo 3DS	High Impact Games, LLC	Activision
DreamWorks Super Star Kartz	2011	Nintendo DS	Virtuos Ltd.	Activision
Shrek Forever After	2010	Sky Gamestar		
The Penguins of Madagascar: Dr. Blowhole Returns – Again!	2011	PlayStation 3, Wii	Griptonite, Inc.	THQ
The Penguins of Madagascar: Dr. Blowhole Returns – Again!	2011	Xbox 360	Griptonite, Inc.	THQ
The Penguins of Madagascar: Dr. Blowhole Returns – Again!	2011	Nintendo DS	Griptonite, Inc.	THQ
Puss in Boots	2011	Xbox 360, Wii, PlayStation 3	Blitz Games Ltd	THQ
Puss in Boots	2011	Nintendo DS	ImaginEngine	THQ
Fruit Ninja: Puss in Boots	2011	iOS, Android	Halfbrick Studios	Halfbrick Studios
Kung Fu Panda 2	2011	PlayStation 3, Wii	Griptonite, Inc.	THQ
Kung Fu Panda 2	2011	Nintendo DS	Griptonite, Inc.	THQ
Kung Fu Panda 2	2011	Xbox 360	Griptonite, Inc.	THQ
Madagascar: Join the Circus!	2012	iPhone, iPad		
Madagascar 3	2012	Wii, Xbox 360, PlayStation 3	Monkey Bar Games	D3
Madagascar 3	2012	Nintendo 3DS, Nintendo DS	Torus Games Pty. Ltd.	D3
Madagascar Online	2012			
Madagascar Preschool Surf n' Slide	2012	IOS, Android		
Shrek's Fairytale Kingdom	2012	iOS		
Shrek Alarm	2013	iOS		
Pocket Shrek	2015	iOS, Android		
Penguins of Madagascar	2014	Nintendo 3DS, Wii, Wii U	Torus Games Pty. Ltd.	Little Orbit, LLC
Kung Fu Panda: Showdown of Legendary Legends	2015	PlayStation 4 PlayStation 3 Xbox 360; Xbox One; Wii U Windows; Nintendo 3DS	Vicious Cycle Software, Inc.	Little Orbit, LLC
Shrek Sugar Fever	2017	iOS, Android	Genera Games S.A.	Genera Games S.A.
Dreamworks Universe of Legends	2019	iOS, Android	Firefly Games; Riva Games; YYTX Game	
Spirit Trick Challenge	2019	Android / iOS	DreamWorks Animation	DreamWorks Animation
Spirit: Lucky's Big Adventure	2021	Windows / PlayStation 4 / Xbox One / Nintendo Switch	aheartfulofgames	Outright Games LTD.
Funko Pop! Blitz	2020	iOS, Android		
DreamWorks All-Star Kart Racing	2023	PlayStation 5, Xbox Series X and Series S, Nintendo Switch, PlayStation 4, Xbox One, and Windows PC	Bamtang Games SAC	GameMill Entertainment LLC
Trolls Remix Rescue	2023	PlayStation 5, Xbox Series X and Series S, Nintendo Switch, PlayStation 4, Xbox One, and Windows PC	Petit Fabrik	GameMill Entertainment LLC
