= Dinotopia (disambiguation) =

Dinotopia is a book series by James Gurney.

Dinotopia may also refer to:

== Film and television ==
- Dinotopia (miniseries), an American-British-German television miniseries
- Dinotopia (TV series), an American television series
- Dinotopia: Quest for the Ruby Sunstone, a 2005 American animated film

== Video games ==
- Dinotopia (video game), a 1996 video game
- Dinotopia: The Timestone Pirates, a 2002 video game
- Dinotopia: The Sunstone Odyssey, a 2003 video game
