= No Rules =

No Rules may refer to:

- No Rules (film), a 2005 film
- No Rules (GMS album)
- No Rules (Rebecca Lynn Howard album)
- "No Rules!", the Finnish entry in the Eurovision Song Contest 2024
- No Rules: Get Phat, a 2001 video game
