= List of The Land Before Time video games =

The Land Before Time is a media franchise that began in 1988 with the release of the eponymous theatrical film directed by Don Bluth and featuring executive producers Steven Spielberg and George Lucas. Since then, a number of spin-off material including a television show and a series of video games have been released. There have been 14 games based on the series, beginning with The Land Before Time Activity Center, released in 1997 for Microsoft Windows, as well as a web game formerly hosted on Cartoon Network's website. The educational games in the video game series go from ages 4–8. This series is aimed at players from infancy through first, second, and third grade (ages 4–8). Genres include action platformers, racing games, and early educational games. All characters in these games are voiced by Lani Minella, and most of them were published by Sound Source Interactive, later renamed TDK Mediactive.

== Titles ==
=== Educational games ===
Title	Details
The Land Before Time Animated MovieBook Original release date: June 4, 1996	Release years by system: 1996 — Microsoft Windows
The Land Before Time Animated MovieBook Original release date: June 4, 1996	The Land Before Time Animated MovieBook is an educational game for Windows-based PCs released by Sound Source Interactive in North America in 1996. The title contains full-motion video clips of the original Land Before Time (making it the Sound Source Interactive software adaptation of the first film in the film series), as well as puzzles and activities intended for players aged 3-6.

Title	Details
The Land Before Time Activity Center Original release date: May 13, 1997	Release years by system: 1997 — Microsoft Windows
The Land Before Time Activity Center Original release date: May 13, 1997	The Land Before Time Activity Center is an educational game for Windows-based PCs. It was published by Sound Source Interactive in North America in 1997, and features a series of minigames related to the series. It is the first video game based on the Land Before Time franchise, released over 8 years after the original film. The title includes dinosaur trivia quizzes, mazes, memory games, and allows the player to create and print their own dinosaur out of preset parts. As they complete activities, players earn "tree stars" that they can use to unlock animated clips from The Land Before Time films. It was included for free with the Land Before Time Sing-Along Songs video cassette released by Universal Studios Home Video that same year.

Title	Details
The Land Before Time: Math Adventure Original release date: July 7, 1998	Release years by system: 1998 — Microsoft Windows
The Land Before Time: Math Adventure Original release date: July 7, 1998	The Land Before Time: Math Adventure is an educational game for Windows-based PCs intended for children ages 4-8. It was released by Sound Source Interactive in North America in 1998. It contains a series of math-oriented minigames that, like The Land Before Time Activity Center, reward the player with "tree stars" and "dino bucks" that can be used to unlock video clips (once again). The game was mentioned in the book Gadgets, Games and Gizmos for Learning by Karl M. Kapp as an example of electronic learning that can allow up-and-coming students to develop problem-solving skills.

Title	Details
The Land Before Time: Kindergarten Adventure Original release dates: NA: 1998; NA: September 16, 2004 (Re-release); EU: 2004	Release years by system: 1998 — Microsoft Windows; 2004 — Microsoft Windows
The Land Before Time: Kindergarten Adventure Original release dates: NA: 1998; NA: September 16, 2004 (Re-release); EU: 2004	The Land Before Time: Kindergarten Adventure (known in Europe as The Land Before Time: Early Learning Adventure) is an educational game released by Sound Source Interactive intended for players ages 4-6. It was originally released for Windows-based PCs in North America in 1998 by Sound Source Interactive, and features six activities ranging from matching to music games. Alecia Dixon of Kaboose called the game a "darling title", commending its movie clips which play during various activities, but felt that its lessons were not properly enforced. She added: "From a parent's perspective, I think the title has some great ideas but I am disappointed. The program teaches concepts but does not provide a way for the child to increase their knowledge once the basic concept is learned". The title was re-released in September 2004 by Brighter Child.

Title	Details
The Land Before Time: Preschool Adventure Original release dates: NA: 1999; NA: October 12, 2005 (Re-release)	Release years by system: 1999 — Microsoft Windows; 2005 — Microsoft Windows
The Land Before Time: Preschool Adventure Original release dates: NA: 1999; NA: October 12, 2005 (Re-release)	The Land Before Time: Preschool Adventure is an educational game for Windows-based PCs intended for children ages 3-5. It was developed by WayForward Technologies and was originally released by Sound Source Interactive in North America in 1999. Designed for players to "have fun, develop their creativity, and learn about teamwork", the game features activities that contain story construction, musical games, and crafts. The game was re-released in October 2005 by Brighter Child.

Title	Details
The Land Before Time: Toddler Time Original release date: NA: October 24, 1999	Release years by system: 1999 — Microsoft Windows
The Land Before Time: Toddler Time Original release date: NA: October 24, 1999	The Land Before Time: Toddler Time is an educational game for Windows-based PCs intended for children ages 2-4. It was released by Sound Source Interactive in North America in October 1999. It features a series of five minigames, each with three difficulty settings featuring characters from the series. In their review of the title, Discovery Educational declared that "we found the label of "toddler" for this software to be somewhat of a misnomer. Most toddler software titles require very little mouse/keyboard skills and feature very basic concepts", saying that the game was more appropriate for players over 3 years old, and that "children in the upper end of the suggested age group will find a fair amount to do".

Title	Details
The Land Before Time: Dinosaur Arcade 3D Original release date: NA: November 28, 2000	Release years by system: 2000 — Microsoft Windows
The Land Before Time: Dinosaur Arcade 3D Original release date: NA: November 28, 2000	The Land Before Time: Dinosaur Arcade 3D is an educational game for Windows-based PCs intended for children ages 4-7 released by Sound Source Interactive in North America in November 2000. The game features five minigames revolving around Littlefoot, Spike, Petrie, Ducky, and Chomper that involve guiding them around various levels and a pinball-style game. Children's Software Review noted that it was less educational than others in its genre, calling it a "strictly an entertainment title", with little real educational value except for some practice with eye-hand coordination and logic.

Title	Details
The Land Before Time: Prehistoric Adventures Original release date: NA: October 1, 2004	Release years by system: 2004 — Microsoft Windows
The Land Before Time: Prehistoric Adventures Original release date: NA: October 1, 2004	The Land Before Time: Prehistoric Adventures is an educational game intended for preschoolers ages 3-5 released by Cosmi and Brighter Child. It was released for Windows-based PCs in North America in October 2004. The game was designed to "increase matching skills, reinforce alphabet, shape and number recognition" and was packaged with two accompanying card games.

=== Other games ===
Title	Details
The Land Before Time: Return to the Great Valley Original release dates: NA: September 14, 2000; EU: 2000	Release years by system: 2000 — PlayStation
The Land Before Time: Return to the Great Valley Original release dates: NA: September 14, 2000; EU: 2000	The Land Before Time: Return to the Great Valley is a 3D platforming game developed by Realtime Associates for the PlayStation. It was published by Sound Source Interactive in North America in September 2000, and TDK Recording Media Europe in PAL regions that same year. The story involves the player guiding four main characters - Littlefoot, Cera, Ducky, and Spike - back to their home in the Great Valley after becoming separated in the Mysterious Beyond.

Title	Details
The Land Before Time: Great Valley Racing Adventure Original release dates: NA: May 1, 2001; EU: May 18, 2001	Release years by system: 2001 — PlayStation
The Land Before Time: Great Valley Racing Adventure Original release dates: NA: May 1, 2001; EU: May 18, 2001	The Land Before Time: Great Valley Racing Adventure (later released in Europe as simply The Land Before Time: Racing Adventure) is a 3D racing video game developed by Vision Scape for the PlayStation. It was published in May 2001 in both North America and Europe by TDK Mediactive. A spokesman from TDK stated that the development goal was to "create a fun and competitive racing game that captures the charm and delight of 'The Land Before Time' characters and environments". The game features foot races between four possible characters: Littlefoot, Cera, Ducky, and Spike, as they compete in eight single-player and two-player courses.

Title	Details
The Land Before Time (Game Boy Color) Original release dates: EU: June 29, 2001; NA: July 14, 2001	Release years by system: 2001 — Game Boy Color
The Land Before Time (Game Boy Color) Original release dates: EU: June 29, 2001; NA: July 14, 2001	The Land Before Time is a 2D platforming game developed by Eclipse Entertainment for the Game Boy Color. It was first released in Europe in June 2001, with a North American release the following month, both published by Conspiracy Entertainment. The game received mostly lower reviews, earning a 40% average from aggregate review website GameRankings.

Title	Details
The Land Before Time (Game Boy Advance) Original release dates: NA: February 28, 2002; EU: March 1, 2002	Release years by system: 2002 — Game Boy Advance
The Land Before Time (Game Boy Advance) Original release dates: NA: February 28, 2002; EU: March 1, 2002	The Land Before Time is a 2D platforming game developed by Full Fat for the Game Boy Advance. It was released in North America in February 2002, and Europe the following month, both published by Conspiracy Entertainment. Despite its identical title, it is not a port of the Game Boy Color version released the previous year. The title earned a slightly higher 43.5% Game Rankings average compared to its handheld predecessor. While IGN felt that the title had some "strong play mechanics", it "doesn't capture much of the fascinating aspects of playing with dinosaurs". The reviewer would elaborate that "the stage design is just a bit too tricky and problematic, and the difficulty control doesn't even it out for it to be fun for the adolescents who love these characters".

Title	Details
The Land Before Time: Big Water Adventure Original release dates: NA: November 27, 2002; EU: May 9, 2003	Release years by system: 2002 — PlayStation
The Land Before Time: Big Water Adventure Original release dates: NA: November 27, 2002; EU: May 9, 2003	The Land Before Time: Big Water Adventure is a platforming game developed by Digital Illusions Canada for the PlayStation. The title was released in November 2002 in North America, and May 2003 in Europe, both by TDK Mediactive, and is based on the 2002 film Journey to Big Water. Players control one of four playable characters: Littlefoot, Cera, Spike, and Ducky, across 12 levels as they help their friend Mo the Ophthalmosaurus make his way back home.

Title	Details
The Land Before Time: Into the Mysterious Beyond Original release dates: EU: February 3, 2006; NA: March 3, 2006	Release years by system: 2006 — Game Boy Advance
The Land Before Time: Into the Mysterious Beyond Original release dates: EU: February 3, 2006; NA: March 3, 2006	The Land Before Time: Into the Mysterious Beyond is a 2D platforming game developed by Sirius Games for the Game Boy Advance. It was released in Europe in February 2006, and later in North America the following March, both published by The Game Factory. The player controls one of the five main characters as they search for their Tyrannosaurus friend Chomper, who has become lost in the Mysterious Beyond, as well as take control of Littlefoot's grandfather in the final stage. Website Family Friendly Gaming called the title "fun, fresh, and based on some of kids favorite characters", commending it for its "very bright and colorful" graphics, but also noted its short play length.

== Web game ==
A web-based Flash game based on the 2007–2008 animated series called The Land Before Time: Adventure Valley was developed by Yamago, and was previously available on the Cartoon Network website. It consists of five levels, each one based on one of the main characters Littlefoot, Cera, Ducky, Petrie, and Spike. Players control each one using the mouse, clicking it to either make them jump or interact with their environment. The game was eventually removed in early August 2009 when the Land Before Time TV show web page was taken down.
