= SeaBlade =

2002 video game

- Developer: Vision Scape Interactive
- Publishers: NA: Simon & Schuster Interactive; EU: TDK Mediactive Europe
- Platform: Xbox
- Release: NA: November 20, 2002; EU: March 28, 2003
- Genre: Shooter
- Mode: Single-player

SeaBlade is a video game developed exclusively for the Xbox by Vision Scape Interactive and published by Simon & Schuster Interactive in 2002, and by TDK Mediactive Europe in Europe in 2003. The game is a shooter game in which players complete missions using craft named SeaBlades that engage in combat in flight and underwater, with seamless transition between air and ocean. SeaBlade was developed by Vision Scape Interactive, a 3D animation studio with minor development experience. Upon release, SeaBlade received negative critical reception, with reviewers critiquing the generic nature of the game, poor utilisation of the air and ocean navigation concept, and poor control scheme.

== Gameplay ==
A screenshot of gameplay in SeaBlade.

SeaBlade is a vehicular combat shooter game in which players control the titular SeaBlades, craft capable of transitioning between aerial flight and underwater navigation. The game features 39 missions set across six environments, where players complete objectives such as reaching checkpoints, deploying equipment, and rescuing civilians, while avoiding or engaging enemy ships and aircraft. Players control their craft using the two analog sticks to strafe and turn. Combat in SeaBlade is fought against other enemy SeaBlades and turrets, and is performed using a default weapon, a gatling gun, with additional weapons acquired through collecting power-ups hidden in the level. The player can use a targeting feature in the HUD that provides the direction of the nearest attacking SeaBlade. The game also features a multiplayer mode, including 'Chaos Reigns', a deathmatch mode, 'Tag', a mode with a time bomb swapped between players that explodes in a time limit, and 'Moving Target', where players compete to first eliminate a computer controlled target.

== Plot ==
In the 24th Century, the polar ice caps have melted, leading to an outbreak of war across Earth's submerged cities between countries in the northern and southern hemispheres. The southern inhabitants in the Southern Alliance enjoy a peaceful existence, whilst the Northern Warlords, driven by war and conquest, threaten to invade the south. The player is David Pierce, a pilot and commander of a squadron of Southern Alliance pilots, tasked with putting an end to the destruction waged by the three Northern Warlords. Stationed on the warship Argosy, the Alliance pilots deploy vehicles named SeaBlades to perform rescue and reconnaissance work in the North.

== Reception ==
Reception

Aggregate score
Aggregator	Score
Metacritic	48/100

Review scores
Publication	Score
Electronic Gaming Monthly	4.5/10
Game Informer	4/10
GameRevolution	C−
GameSpot	4.5/10
GameZone	5.5/10
IGN	5.7/10
Official Xbox Magazine (US)	4.5/10
Xbox Nation (XBN)	2/10

The game received "generally unfavorable reviews" according to the review aggregation website Metacritic, with an average score of 48% from 11 reviews. Many reviewers critiqued the gameplay of SeaBlade, finding little to distinguish the game from other titles. Describing the game as "bland" and "devoid of any sort of creativity", Greg Orlando of Electronic Gaming Monthly critiqued the game for its "dull power-ups" and "uninspired blast-em-up missions". Alex Navarro of GameSpot described the game as a "pretty dull experience", noting the "sloppy execution and boring gameplay mechanics", noting the "disappointing" underutilisation of underwater combat. IGN critiqued the "little variety" in the missions, writing "most of the time you'll be flying back and forth through the levels, acting as a high-tech chauffeur." Nebojsa Radakovic of Game Revolution similarly described the gameplay as "frustrating" and "flat", finding that the game lacked "cool nautical battles" and featured an "invisible ceiling that is not very high at all, robbing the player of any grueling aerial escapes high in the sky."

Reviewers also faulted the game's control scheme. Alex Navarro of GameSpot wrote "much of the combat in SeaBlade leans more toward frustration than actual difficulty, as controlling your ship is a pretty harrowing experience", describing the controls as "ridiculously loose, leading to tons of missed turns and power-up items in times of desperation." Paul Byrnes of Xbox Nation wrote "the controls are difficult and unintuitive", citing the game's lack of inverted control options. GameZone wrote that "the controls are what kill this game", describing them as "un-user friendly" and that "players will spend more time fighting with the controller trying to fly the ship than fighting enemies and accomplishing their mission objectives." Greg Orlando of Electronic Gaming Monthly noted that the use of the analog stick to control acceleration was "extremely taxing on the thumbs to do continually." Whilst IGN found the controls to be "tight and mostly responsive", they faulted the game's control scheme as "challenging" and the targeting system as an "exercise in frustration".
