= TDK Mediactive =

Video game publisher

TDK Mediactive was a brand name given to two multimedia divisions of Japanese multinational electronics company TDK; the first—TDK Mediactive Europe—was a subsidiary of TDK Recording Media Europe that dealt with the distribution of music DVDs and the publication of video games and software, while the other—TDK Mediactive, Inc.—was solely a video game publisher and a rebranding of developer/publisher Sound Source Interactive. Both companies were unaffiliated with one another in management aside from licensing each other's titles for each market they operated under, and went their separate ways following changes in ownership.

== TDK Mediactive Europe ==
TDK Mediactive Europe
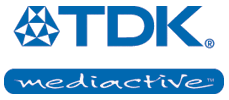
- Type: Division
- Industry: Video games, Computer software, Home video
- Founded: 1999; 27 years ago
- Defunct: May 2005; 21 years ago
- Headquarters: Ratingen, Germany
- Parent: TDK Recording Media Europe (1999–2005)

TDK Mediactive Europe was a division of TDK Recording Media Europe founded in 1999 that published video games, software and DVDs under the TDK brand.

In April 2000, TDK Mediactive Europe announced it would secure exclusive international publishing rights to Sound Source Interactive's products. This continued after the purchase of the company by TDK in September, with TDK Mediactive Europe becoming the exclusive European Publishing partner for technology and content licenses held by TDK Mediactive, Inc., which included publication and localization. However, TDK Mediactive Europe continued to publish and distribute its own titles, such as Knights of the Temple: Infernal Crusade.

On September 6, 2001, TDK Mediactive Europe supplied an exclusive North American licensing agreement to allow TDK Mediactive, Inc. to publish video games based on Mercedes-Benz.

On March 15, 2002, the company signed a deal with O3 Games to publish Templar. In June, it moved from Bascharage, Luxembourg, to Ratingen, Germany, where TDK Recording Media Europe was already located.

On May 4, 2005, TDK Mediactive Europe signed a publishing deal with Playlogic Entertainment to allow the latter to publish its existing video game titles. The fate of the TDK Mediactive Europe company itself is currently unknown, although the company's website remains open.

=== Video games ===
Title	Platform(s)	Release date	Developer	Ref.
Babe and Friends: Animated Preschool Adventure	macOS	1999	Sound Source Interactive	
Babe and Friends: Animated Preschool Adventure	Microsoft Windows	1999	Sound Source Interactive	
The Land Before Time: Math Adventure	macOS	1999	Digital Media International	
The Land Before Time: Math Adventure	Microsoft Windows	1999	Digital Media International	
The Land Before Time: Return to the Great Valley	PlayStation	September 15, 2000	Realtime Associates	
Casper: Friends Around the World	PlayStation	November 16, 2000	Realtime Associates	
Elevator Action EX	Game Boy Color	2000	Altron	
Westlife Fan-O-Mania	Microsoft Windows	June 6, 2002	Runecraft	
Westlife Fan-O-Mania	PlayStation	June 28, 2002	Runecraft	
Outlaw Golf	Xbox	February 4, 2003	Hypnotix	
Darkened Skye	GameCube	May 28, 2003	Boston Animation	
Outlaw Volleyball	Xbox	July 3, 2003	Hypnotix	
Mercedes-Benz World Racing	Microsoft Windows	September 19, 2003	Synetic	
Mercedes-Benz World Racing	PlayStation 2	September 19, 2003	Synetic	
Outlaw Golf	GameCube	November 4, 2003	Hypnotix	
Outlaw Golf	Microsoft Windows	November 21, 2003	Hypnotix	
Outlaw Golf	PlayStation 2	November 24, 2003	Buzz Monkey Software	
Knights of the Temple: Infernal Crusade	GameCube	March 19, 2004	Starbreeze Studios	
Conan	Microsoft Windows	April 8, 2004	Cauldron	
Conan	PlayStation 2	April 8, 2004	Cauldron	
Conan	Xbox	April 8, 2004	Cauldron	
Knights of the Temple: Infernal Crusade	Microsoft Windows	April 8, 2004	Starbreeze Studios	
Knights of the Temple: Infernal Crusade	Xbox	April 8, 2004	Starbreeze Studios	
Mercedes-Benz World Racing	GameCube	April 8, 2004	Synetic	
Conan	GameCube	April 30, 2004	Cauldron	
Knights of the Temple: Infernal Crusade	PlayStation 2	June 4, 2004	Starbreeze Studios	

== Take-Two Licensing ==
Take-Two Licensing, Inc.
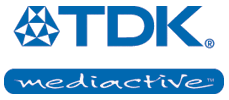
- Formerly: Sound Source Interactive, Inc. (1988–2000); TDK Mediactive, Inc. (2000–2003)
- Type: Subsidiary
- Industry: Video games
- Founded: 1988; 38 years ago
- Founder: Vincent Bitetti
- Defunct: January 25, 2005; 21 years ago
- Fate: Folded into 2K
- Headquarters: Westlake Village, California, United States
- Key people: Shin Tanabe (president, CEO); Martin Paravato (CFO)
- Parent: TDK (2000–2003); Take-Two Interactive (2003–2005)

TDK Mediactive, Inc. (formerly Sound Source Interactive, Inc., later renamed Take-Two Licensing, Inc.) was an American video game publisher based in Westlake Village, California. Founded as Sound Source Interactive by Vincent Bitetti in 1988, the company acquired BWT Labs in March 1998. In September 2000, the company was acquired by TDK and became TDK Mediactive. Take-Two Interactive acquired the company's North American operations in September 2003, renaming itself as Take-Two Licensing the following December. With the foundation of Take-Two Interactive's 2K Games label in January 2005, Take-Two Licensing was effectively folded into the new subsidiary.

=== History ===
Sound Source Interactive was founded in 1988 by Vincent Bitetti. In March 1998, Sound Source Interactive announced that it had acquired BWT Labs, a Berkeley, California-based video game developer.

On September 11, 2000, TDK acquired a 72% controlling stake in Sound Source Interactive, with an initial investment of US$1.425 million, followed by another of US$3.575 million, totaling to US$5 million. The buyout resulted in Sound Source rebranding under the TDK Mediactive name, with the company's founder, Vincent Bitetti, remaining chief executive officer and Shin Tanabe, President of TDK Recording Media Europe and the European division of TDK Mediactive, becoming the publisher's chief operating officer. As TDK Mediactive, the company published various video games, of which many based on licensed properties. With this, TDK inherited Sound Source's existing licenses with Universal Pictures for The Land Before Time and The Harvey Entertainment Company for the Harvey Comics characters, among others.

On December 20, 2000, the company signed an exclusive video game licensing deal with DreamWorks SKG to produce and publish games based on Shrek.

On April 13, 2001, the company signed a five-year deal with clothing brand No Limits to publish games based on the license. At E3 2001, the company secured the video game licensing rights to RoboTech from Mattel. The company later signed a deal with The Beanstalk Group to produce games based on Dinotopia. On September 27, 2001, the company announced a two-year co-publishing agreement with Activision Value to handle the Right of first refusal for TDK's PC titles. In November 2001, the company announced to publish games for the GameCube. This was followed with a licensing agreement from DC to produce video games based on Aquaman in December.

The company continued gaining exclusive video game rights to franchises through 2002. It secured a deal with Jim Henson Interactive to produce games based on The Muppets in April, an extension of its Shrek license to also include video game rights to Shrek 2, a deal with Mattel for He-Man, a Nintendo-only deal with Hasbro for the Tonka franchise in May (under a sub-licensing agreement with Infogrames), and Disney Interactive with Pirates of the Caribbean: The Curse of the Black Pearl and The Haunted Mansion from Disney Interactive in July. On October 18, 2002, the company launched TDK Impulse, a publishing label intended for games that had "broad consumer appeal and a low price point".

In January 2003, the company purchased the video game licensing rights to the UFC from Crave Entertainment. May 2003, the company announced its Shrek 2 video game tie-in would be a co-publishing collaboration with Activision.

On September 3, 2003, TDK Mediactive, Inc. announced that it was to be acquired by Take-Two Interactive for an estimated US$22.7 million. The transaction was finalized on December 2, 2003, with 23,005,885 shares, valued at US$12.6 million, and another US$200,000 in cash awarded to TDK. Afterwards, Take-Two rebranded TDK Mediactive, Inc. as Take-Two Licensing, Inc. and received all its licenses except for the Shrek license, which was fully obtained Activision after it signed a new deal with DreamWorks, with Activision terminating its previous existing licensing agreement it previously had with TDK for Shrek 2 games.

On February 11, 2004, Take-Two announced a licensing agreement with Cartoon Network to publish video games based on Cartoon Network shows, with Codename: Kids Next Door – Operation: V.I.D.E.O.G.A.M.E. being the first under the deal.

On January 25, 2005, Take-Two Interactive announced the opening of publishing label 2K Games, into which Take-Two Licensing was folded.

=== Games published ===
==== As Sound Source Interactive ====
Title	Platform(s)	Release date	Developer	Ref.
Babe: A Little Pig Goes a Long Way	Windows	1995	Sound Source Interactive	
Star Trek: The Game Show	Windows, Macintosh	February 9, 1998	Sound Source Interactive	
The Abyss: Incident at Europa	Windows	October 1, 1998	Sound Source Interactive	

==== As TDK Mediactive ====
Title	Platform(s)	Release date	Developer	Ref.
The Land Before Time: Great Valley Racing Adventure	PlayStation	May 4, 2001	Vision Scape Interactive	
Shrek: Fairy Tale Freakdown	Game Boy Color	May 30, 2001	Prolific	
Wendy: Every Witch Way	Game Boy Color	September 2001	WayForward Technologies	
Casper: Spirit Dimensions	PlayStation 2	October 1, 2001	Lucky Chicken Games	
Lady Sia	Game Boy Advance	October 16, 2001	RFX Interactive	
No Rules: Get Phat	Game Boy Advance	November 15, 2001	Flying Tiger Development	
Shrek	Xbox	November 15, 2001	Digital Illusions Canada	
Rainbow Islands	Game Boy Color	2001	Dreams Co.	
Shrek: Swamp Kart Speedway	Game Boy Advance	March 25, 2002	Prolific Publishing	
Dinotopia: The Timestone Pirates	Game Boy Advance	April 30, 2002	RFX Interactive	
Pryzm: Chapter One - The Dark Unicorn	PlayStation 2	June 10, 2002	Digital Illusions CE	
Robotech: Battlecry	GameCube	August 23, 2002	Vicious Cycle Software	
Robotech: Battlecry	PlayStation 2	September 23, 2002	Vicious Cycle Software	
Robotech: Battlecry	Xbox	September 23, 2002	Vicious Cycle Software	
Casper: Spirit Dimensions	GameCube	October 1, 2002	Lucky Chicken Games	
Shrek: Hassle at the Castle	Game Boy Advance	October 10, 2002	Tose	
Shrek: Treasure Hunt	PlayStation	October 18, 2002	The Code Monkeys	
Shrek Extra Large	GameCube	October 30, 2002	Digital Illusions Canada	
Masters of the Universe: He-Man - Power of Grayskull	Game Boy Advance	November 2, 2002	Taniko	
Robotech: The Macross Saga	Game Boy Advance	November 15, 2002	Lucky Chicken Games	
Shrek: Super Party	PlayStation 2	November 15, 2002	Mass Media Games	
Shrek: Super Party	Xbox	November 15, 2002	Mass Media Games	
The Land Before Time: Big Water Adventure	PlayStation	November 27, 2002	Digital Illusions CE	
Ultimate Fighting Championship: Tapout 2	Xbox	March 20, 2003	DreamFactory	
SeaBlade	Xbox	March 28, 2003	Vision Scape Interactive	
The Muppets: On With the Show!	Game Boy Advance	April 17, 2003	Vicarious Visions	
Shrek: Super Party	GameCube	May 29, 2003	Mass Media Games	
Pirates of the Caribbean: The Curse of the Black Pearl	Game Boy Advance	July 1, 2003	Pocket Studios	
Aquaman: Battle for Atlantis	GameCube	July 23, 2003	Lucky Chicken Games	
Dinotopia: The Sunstone Odyssey	GameCube	July 23, 2003	Vicious Cycle Software	
Shrek: Reekin' Havoc	Game Boy Advance	July 31, 2003	Tose	
Dinotopia: The Sunstone Odyssey	Xbox	August 5, 2003	Vicious Cycle Software	
Disney's The Haunted Mansion	GameCube	October 14, 2003	High Voltage Software	
Disney's The Haunted Mansion	PlayStation 2	October 14, 2003	High Voltage Software	
Disney's The Haunted Mansion	Xbox	October 14, 2003	High Voltage Software	
Corvette	Game Boy Advance	November 11, 2003	Visual Impact	
Jim Henson's Muppets Party Cruise	GameCube	November 11, 2003	Jim Henson Interactive / Mass Media Games	
Jim Henson's Muppets Party Cruise	PlayStation 2	November 11, 2003	Jim Henson Interactive / Mass Media Games	
Spy Muppets: License to Croak	Game Boy Advance	November 18, 2003	Vicarious Visions	
Tonka Rescue Patrol	GameCube	November 18, 2003	Lucky Chicken Games	

==== As Take-Two Licensing ====
Title	Platform(s)	Release date	Developer	Ref.
Corvette	Microsoft Windows	December 10, 2003	Steel Monkeys	
Corvette	Xbox	December 10, 2003	Steel Monkeys	
Star Trek: Shattered Universe	PlayStation 2	January 13, 2004	Starsphere Interactive	
Star Trek: Shattered Universe	Xbox	January 14, 2004	Starsphere Interactive	
