= Star Trek: The Game Show =

1998 video game

- Developer: Sound Source Interactive
- Publisher: Sound Source Interactive
- Series: Star Trek
- Platforms: Windows, Classic Mac OS
- Release: February 9, 1998
- Genre: Quiz
- Modes: Single-player, multiplayer

Star Trek: The Game Show is a quiz video game set in the Star Trek universe released in 1998 for the Windows and Macintosh by Sound Source Interactive.

Another similar game, Star Trek Trivia Challenge, was released by Sound Source Interactive in 1999.

== Gameplay ==
The game is presented as a game show hosted by Q (John de Lancie), an all-powerful extra-dimensional being, and a female assistant (a Q in training) (Karen Cornwell). The game comprises four distinct rounds ("quadrants"), covering four television series and seven films from the franchise. Each round features a unique gameplay style and theme. If the player answers incorrectly or runs out of time, a character known as Mr. Knowitall (T. Buffalo Wagnon) frequently pops up to give the correct answer. Some questions require the player to type in the specific answer without any spelling mistakes. With multiple choice questions, each player (up to 3) has a buzzer key assigned on the keyboard. The questions are not randomized, they are in the same order every playthrough.

== Reception ==
Reception

Review scores
Publication	Score
Computer Gaming World	2/5 stars
PC Player (DE)	61/100

Computer Gaming World noted that the game lacks the humor found in the You Don't Know Jack series and criticized its interface design. However, the sound design and De Lancie's performance were praised as strengths. PC Player remarked that the questions cater more to dedicated Star Trek fans rather than a casual audience. The magazine also compared the game unfavorably to You Don't Know Jack. Q was highlighted as a positive feature. Ultimate PC wrote: "Get ten pints of lager down your neck and The Game Show's a riot - really." In the book Star Trek Video Games, Mat Bradley-Tschirgi wrote that Q was "a perfect fit" for the game. Mr. Knowitall's constant appearances were described as "frustrating instead of entertaining". The game's interface was noted as "too rigid". PC Gamer described the game as a "cash-grab" and "a truly soulless trivia contest". The music was noted as "painful".
