= Shrek: Treasure Hunt =

2002 video game

- North American cover art
- Developer: The Code Monkeys
- Publisher: TDK Mediactive
- Producer: Mandy Ingham
- Programmers: John Christie; Chris Brown; Paul Slinger; Mark Kirkby
- Artist: David Blewett
- Platform: PlayStation
- Release: NA: October 18, 2002; PAL: November 29, 2002
- Genres: Party, platform
- Mode: Single-player

Shrek: Treasure Hunt is a 2002 party video game developed by The Code Monkeys and published by TDK Mediactive for the PlayStation. It released in North American on October 18, 2002, and in PAL regions on November 29, 2002. It is the only Shrek game released for the PlayStation.

== Gameplay ==
Shrek: Treasure Hunt is a party video game in which players control Shrek on collecting items for the picnic, they will have to go through minigames and challenges, in order to complete the level and receive items. Minigames can be accessed by collecting the required amount of items throughout each platforming stage. Collectables can be found.

== Story ==
As Shrek is preparing a picnic with Fiona, the three blind mice steal all the picnic equipment such as food and drinks, so Shrek must go on an adventure completing minigames to get the items back before Fiona arrives.

== Development ==
The game was revealed at E3 2002 for a Summer release window. Digital Illusions Canada was planned to develop the game, but switched focus to Shrek Extra Large.

Upon the game's North American release in October, TDK Mediactive announced the formation of the "TDK Impulse" budget label, which was designed to appeal to mainstream buyers of video games, with their titles retailing for the budget price of $9.99.

== Reception ==
Review aggregator GameRankings reported that Games Master UK assigned the game a score of 29 out of 100.
