= Lady Sia =

2001 video game

- Developer: RFX Interactive
- Publisher: TDK Mediactive
- Platform: Game Boy Advance
- Release: NA: September 27, 2001; EU: October 19, 2001
- Genres: Platformer, action-adventure
- Mode: Single player

Lady Sia is a platformer with action-adventure elements made by RFX Interactive for the Game Boy Advance. It was published by TDK Mediactive, released in the USA on October 15, 2001, and released in Europe on October 19, 2001. Lady Sia is one of the few original games produced by RFX Interactive. The game takes place in a fantasy world where the player assumes the role of the She-Ra/Xena-esque warrior princess, Lady Sia. It is her task to defeat the T'soas, a race of creatures created by the evil warlock Onimen who has declared war on the other realms. Her quest leads her through four different realms, the last one being the home continent of the T'soas themselves. A sequel was planned for the GameCube and GBA in 2003 but was cancelled due to TDK Mediactive being purchased by Take-Two Interactive that same year.

== Gameplay ==
Sia racing the Air Kingdom's queen

Lady Sia is a traditional platformer with action-adventure elements. As such, players have to watch out for numerous enemies as well as make sure not to fall off of the platforms. The world Sia must cross is divided into four areas, each of which are divided into four levels, a main boss fight, and a bonus level. Levels focus on either fighting or acrobatics. Sia has three lives per level, but the player can temporarily acquire more by collecting gems. If the player loses a life, they must restart at the beginning of the level or at the last checkpoint. Checkpoints are found halfway through each level and usually depicted as golden whirlwind images that turn into an image of Sia when activated. If all lives are lost, Sia is "thrown in jail" and the player receives ten seconds to decide whether to restart the level or quit.

A perfect score on a level is 100 points: five points per health point, one point per magic point, one point per collectible gem, and five points per freed prisoner. Getting a perfect score for each of one area's four levels grants access to the bonus level. In addition, Sia must prove her worth to the other leaders in the first three levels of the second area by battling two of them and racing a third. Sia's status after these boss battles has no effect on her score for that level. Defeating the main boss in each level grants access to the next area. All levels and boss battles can be replayed as many times as desired.

=== Fighting ===
Sia is a capable warrior blessed with several magical abilities. The primary form of combat is melee sword combat. Players fight with an average sword in the first level, but can get Sia's jade sword back in the second level. The jade sword is a more powerful weapon, allows the player to use the three combo moves, and automatically replaces the weaker original sword. Sia's magical abilities are mostly used for ranged combat. During the first level, her magical abilities are limited to shooting small balls of energy in one of eight directions. In the third level, Sia regains her family's magic ring. This item allows the player to charge an energy ball before releasing it so that it becomes more powerful. Completing the first three levels of the second area adds three more spells to the repertory. The Water Spell is a defensive spell and makes Sia invulnerable for ten seconds. The Fire Spell creates an explosion that hits every enemy on the screen and damages them, killing only the weakest. The Air Spell hits only the closest enemy, but is guaranteed to kill it in one hit. Sia's final magical ability is shapeshifting. As a shapeshifter, she has the ability to turn into a "sasquatch". The game does not allow the player to do this at will; Sia's sasquatch form can only be used when she automatically shapeshifts during three of the four main boss battles. In this form Sia can no longer use magic and must rely on melee combat again, but becomes much stronger with more melee combat abilities. These new abilities include ground pound, shield, and dash.

== Plot ==
=== Story ===
Onimen, a powerful warlock, found ancient magic in the continent of Callyge. He used the magic to create a race of half-human/half-beasts known as the T'soas. Using huge turtles to transport his new army over the sea, he invaded the continent of Athorre, the human kingdom, and quickly took control. The remaining realms did not know how to react and their leaders forsook their military alliances. The only one convinced of the need to act was the young Queen of Myriade, Lady Sia.

The story starts with Sia having called the leaders of the remaining realms together in the meeting room of her castle. She tries to convince them of the danger of the situation, but she doesn't succeed. Sia is then informed by her advisor, Barthes, that a T'soa horde is near her castle. She quickly leaves the meeting room to check the situation. She, however, is ambushed and locked away in a cell of Athorre's castle. She is awoken and freed by a mysterious, cloaked man who gives her some advice and information before running off. Now alone, Sia soon finds a new ally in a chained griffin in another part of the castle. As a way of thanking her for freeing him, the bird offers to aid Sia in her quest by bringing her wherever she wants to go. Sia first goes search for her jade sword and family magic ring, which are two powerful artifacts stolen from her by the T'soas.

Before going home to save her own kingdom, Sia decides to visit the leaders of the other realms to check on their current alliance statuses and, if necessary, restore old ones. The other leaders, Poseidon of the Water Kingdom, Rafooza of the Fire Kingdom and her sister, Cheyenne, the queen of the Air Kingdom, had gone home after Sia failed to return to the meeting room. Sia manages to convince each of them to join in the battle against the T'soas and Onimen.

Sia in Myriade's library

Back in Myriade, Sia finds her kingdom completely taken over by the T'soas. Furious, she visits the important locations of her kingdom to free them from the T'soas and save what is left. Eventually, she comes face to face with one of Onimen's most powerful minions, known as the Fox Lady. Sia defeats the Fox Lady and thereby frees her land from the T'soas.

Having restored her own army and her alliances with the other realms, Sia goes on ahead to prepare a safe passage for the armies. She discovers the turtles the T'soas used to cross the sea and frees them so the armies of the alliance can use them to reach Callyge. After this, she infiltrates Callyge's fortifications on her own and ends up in a battle with Onimen. The battle ends undecided: Onimen transforms into a demon-like creature and flies away. That night, the kingdoms celebrate they've won the war. The leaders on the other hand, have a meeting to decide what to do with the T'soas now that their king and creator, Onimen, is gone. Sia proposes to make peace, as Onimen was the real enemy and not the T'soas. Before they can have a real discussion about the matter, the cloaked stranger that helped Sia escape from Athorre's castle appears. He offers to govern the T'soas for them. Sia is surprised to see him again, but is willing to accept the offer. After telling the others what the stranger did for her, they agree as well.

=== Setting ===
Lady Sia takes place in an unnamed fantasy world. Gameplay takes place in the three continents involved in the war, each of which are separated by seas. Two of these continents serve as kingdoms. The continent of Athorre is the kingdom of humans. These humans do not possess magic, but have a good understanding of technology and city construction. Athorre is the first realm attacked by the T'soas. By the time Sia starts her quest, the kingdom has been completely taken over. The T'soas use Athorre's castle jail to imprison Sia and the village Algambiade and the city Merrion to hide Sia's sword and ring. Northeast of Athorre lies an unnamed continent that contains multiple kingdoms. The elemental kingdoms are located in the northern part of the continent. Present in the game are the Water Kingdom, the Fire Kingdom and the Air Kingdom. It appears that an Earth Kingdom was planned, but eventually not implemented. Each kingdom is ruled by a monarch who is capable of powerful magic. Sia's kingdom, Myriade, is separated from the elemental realms by the Snowy Mountain and located in the southern part of the continent. Myriade's inhabitants appear well-versed in magic. The continent of Callyge is located in the northeast of the map and is the T'soas' and Onimen's headquarters. Seaports protect Callyge from attacks.

== Reception ==
Reception

Aggregate score
Aggregator	Score
Metacritic	73/100

Review scores
Publication	Score
Computer and Video Games	8/10
Electronic Gaming Monthly	4.5/10
Game Informer	7.5/10
GamesMaster	85%
GameSpot	8.7/10
GameSpy	74%
GameZone	8.5/10
IGN	8/10
Nintendo Power	4.5/5
Nintendo World Report	6/10

Lady Sia received "average" reviews according to the review aggregation website Metacritic. In particular, it was praised for its beautiful, anime-inspired, hand-drawn graphics that had a slightly cartoonic feel to them. However, the press also considered this one of Lady Sia's weaknesses and said it was difficult to distinguish between background and interactive game elements.

Another aspect Lady Sia was praised for was its solid gameplay that IGN described as "a decent balance between" standard platformers and Final Fight clones. Sia herself has a remarkable number of abilities at her disposal. Although this prevented combat from being too repetitive, most reviewers felt Sia's abilities could have used a little more fine-tuning. For example, some reviewers thought Sia's elemental spells were hard to cast, as performing them required a combination of control pad buttons. Thus, Sia needs room to move on-screen, which, due to the platform structure, isn't always an option. Some of her sword combos had a similar shortcoming. GameSpy wrote: "They often cause her to slide off platforms or into enemies." The reviewers also criticized the fact that if Sia hit a checkpoint, it saved her current magic and health status. This made the checkpoint practically worthless if activated when the player only has a little bit of health left. GameSpot considered this and the combos to be the game's only two weaknesses.

In the end, Lady Sia garnered mostly positive reviews. IGN summarized it with the quote, "Lady Sia's a good one," and GameSpot did so with: "Thanks to its solid control, clever puzzles, and stellar production values, Lady Sia is easily worth a trip to the local game shop." GameSpy concluded that there were better platform games on the market, but that Lady Sia was still a worthwhile game.
