= Shrek (video game) =

2001 video game

- North American Xbox box art
- Developer: Digital Illusions Canada
- Publisher: TDK Mediactive
- Director: Gary Corriveau
- Designers: Gary Corriveau; Atman Binstock
- Programmers: Atman Binstock; Richard Geldreich
- Artist: Denis Cawson
- Composer: David Kerr
- Platforms: Xbox, GameCube
- Release: Xbox: NA: November 15, 2001; EU: March 27, 2002; UK: March 29, 2002; GameCube: NA: October 30, 2002; EU: February 14, 2003
- Genre: Platformer
- Mode: Single-player

Shrek is a 2001 platform video game developed by Digital Illusions Canada and published by TDK Mediactive for the Xbox, based on the 2001 film Shrek. The game was released on November 15, 2001, as one of 22 North American launch titles for the Xbox and March 27, 2002, in Europe, with a United Kingdom release following on March 29. A reworked version of the game, titled Shrek: Extra Large, was released for the GameCube on October 30, 2002, in North America and on October 24, 2003, in Europe. Shrek: Extra Large uses the same engine and game mechanics as the original Xbox release, but with an altered story and different levels.

While it was a commercial success, Shrek received generally negative reviews upon release, with criticism being directed at its gameplay and audio.

== Gameplay ==
As the titular character Shrek, the player completes objectives named "Good Deeds" in different areas accessible in a storybook overworld. Shrek can walk, run, jump, and wall jump through platforming levels, and he can subdue enemies by punching, kicking, throwing, or using flatulence on them. Enemies will try to inflict damage on Shrek, and the player can recover Shrek's health by collecting hearts. Enemies can be temporarily stunned if Shrek uses many punches, kicks, or flatulence, which he gains the power to use by eating onions. Explosive flatulence can be used as a weapon if the player collects enough chili peppers. Unlike other games, enemies can only be knocked out and do not die or re-spawn. Shrek's objectives may require platform jumping and wall jumping to get to the required area of the game.

== Plot ==
Following a completely different narrative than that of the eponymous film which it is based on, Shrek is meant to be a "continuation" of the story of the film, taking place after the title character has set out to regain his swamp and become a "'de facto' hero" to the fairy tale creatures. Shrek is delivered a message by the infamous Magic Mirror that his wife Princess Fiona has been captured by an evil wizard, Merlin. Shrek must travel to Merlin's Dark Tower Fortress of Pure Evil, but an impassable fog has been laid across the Fairy Tale Lands. The fog and Merlin's Fortress can be passed through the completion of Good Deeds. The Magic Mirror gives Shrek a Book of Good Deeds and offers to teleport him to places where Good Deeds are required.

== Development ==
On December 20, 2000, TDK Mediactive signed a five-year deal with DreamWorks SKG to produce video games based on the Shrek licence; the plan upon signing was to release a Game Boy title coinciding with the film's release and issue another game for "a next generation platform" in the fourth quarter of 2001. On February 6, 2001, the next-generation console was announced to be Xbox, development duties would go towards Sandbox Studios, and the game would use character and object models from the original movie. In April, Digital Illusions CE purchased Sandbox Studios, and was soon renamed as Digital Illusions Canada. However, the game remained on schedule. The game was noted for its use of deferred shading and other advanced rendering techniques, owing to the developers being able to write an advanced renderer without the constraints imposed by limited hardware typically targeted by games aimed towards children, such as the need for software rendering as a fallback in low-end computers that lack a graphics accelerator. On May 16, 2001, IGN released nine clips of gameplay footage from the Xbox title, noting "details in the graphics including loads of bump mapping an [sic] per pixel shading."

Shortly after the game's release, TDK Mediactive announced that a Shrek title would be released for the GameCube in 2002. In December, it was officially announced that Digital Illusions would handle the game for a Q3 2002 release on the GameCube, while a PlayStation 2 version would follow in Q4 2002. IGN assumed that the late release could mean that the port would be a different game outright. The PlayStation 2 port of Shrek Extra Large was never officially revealed, and it is very likely that the port never got past the announcement stage. The purchase of TDK Mediactive's US operations by Take-Two Interactive in September 2003 and being stripped of the Shrek license prevented a release otherwise.

== Reception ==
Reception

Aggregate score
Aggregator	Score	
Aggregator	GameCube	Xbox
Metacritic	36/100	49/100

Review scores
Publication	Score	
Publication	GameCube	Xbox
AllGame	N/A	2/5
Electronic Gaming Monthly	N/A	3.33/10
Game Informer	3/10	2/10
GamePro	N/A	2.5/5
GameRevolution	N/A	D+
GameSpot	N/A	5.3/10
GameSpy	N/A	48%
IGN	3/10	5.6/10
Next Generation	N/A	1/5
Nintendo Power	2.1/5	N/A
Official Xbox Magazine (US)	N/A	5.3/10
X-Play	1/5	N/A
The Cincinnati Enquirer	N/A	3.5/5

Both Shrek and Extra Large received "generally unfavorable reviews" according to the review aggregation website Metacritic. Reviewers criticized the gameplay in particular, as well as the audio. IGN described Extra Large's puzzles as "run of the mill" and complained of the lack of audio in certain sections of the game. X-Play criticized Extra Large's framerate, "jerky" animation, and camera control claiming it could make some players nauseous. Critics generally praised the game's graphical presentation, with X-Play's Skyler Miller saying the game's graphics were "impressive at a standstill" and Raymond Padilla of GameSpy claiming the in-game graphics matched the movie's visuals.

Extra Large's visuals were less favorably received, with IGN critiquing the game's lack of bump mapping when transitioned over to the GameCube as well as the poor animation. NextGen said of the Xbox version, "This young-skewing platform adventure is kept from greatness by a few small things – namely, bland, broken gameplay; an uncannily counterintruitive camera; unfocused, comically haphazard level design and goals; and ho-hum sound. Simply put, this game sucks."

On December 11, 2001, TDK Mediactive CFO Martin Paravato reported sales for both Fairy Tale Freakdown and the Xbox version making up "a significant portion of our revenue." Shrek was the ninth-highest selling Xbox for the month of November 2001, selling 45,900 units and making up 2.6% of the console's revenue.

As of October 2002, total units of all of TDK's Shrek games released at the time, including the Game Boy Color, Xbox, and GameCube games as well as Hassle at the Castle (2002), totaled over 1.2 million units in sales.
