= Corvette (video game) =

2003 video game

- North American PlayStation 2 cover art
- Developers: Steel Monkeys; Visual Impact (GBA)
- Publishers: TDK Mediactive; Global Star Software
- Platforms: Windows, Xbox, Game Boy Advance, PlayStation 2
- Release: GBA: NA: November 11, 2003; PC, Xbox: NA: December 10, 2003; PlayStation 2: NA: March 9, 2004; EU: April 30, 2004
- Genre: Racing game
- Modes: Single-player, multiplayer

Corvette is a 2003 racing video game developed by Steel Monkeys and published by TDK Mediactive for Windows, Xbox, and Game Boy Advance, and by Global Star Software for PlayStation 2 and later prints of the Xbox version. The GBA version was developed by Visual Impact. The game is based on the Chevrolet Corvette sports car in celebration of the line's 50th anniversary, and lets players race in all five generations of Corvette that existed at the time.

== Racing format ==
Four 2001 Corvette Z06s race on the Rockbridge Falls track.

The racing format for this game contains Quick Race, Arcade, and Career mode. In the Arcade and Career modes, the player begins in the first generation of Corvette in a series of races. There are several series of racing for each generation of Corvette. As the player wins races, they earn minor upgrades for their car. The final race in each generation of Corvette is a One-on-One race on the open road. If the player wins, they will go to the next generation of Corvette and its respective races. Once these modes are completed, the player will unlock many cars, customized parts, and tracks available for use in the Quick Race mode.

== Multiplayer ==
Corvette supports split screen and online multiplayer. In line with other online-enabled games on the original Xbox, multiplayer on Xbox Live was available to players until April 15, 2010. Corvette is now playable online again on the revival online servers called Insignia.

== Reception ==
Reception

Aggregate scores
Aggregator	Score
GameRankings	(Xbox) 52.20% (PS2) 51.41% (GBA) 49%
Metacritic	(GBA) 58/100 (PS2) 57/100 (Xbox) 53/100

Review scores
Publication	Score
Game Informer	4.5/10
GameSpot	(GBA) 4.9/10 (Xbox) 4.3/10 (PS2) 4/10
GameSpy	2/5
GameZone	7.2/10
IGN	(Xbox) 6.2/10 (PS2) 5.5/10
Nintendo Power	2.9/5
Official U.S. PlayStation Magazine	3.5/5
TeamXbox	5.8/10
X-Play	1/5

The game was met with a generally mixed to negative reception. GameRankings and Metacritic gave it a score of 52.20% and 53 out of 100 for the Xbox version; 51.41% and 57 out of 100 for the PlayStation 2 version; and 49% and 58 out of 100 for the Game Boy Advance version.
