= The Land Before Time (2001 video game) =

- Developer: Eclipse Entertainment
- Publishers: EU: Swing! Entertainment; NA: Conspiracy Entertainment
- Series: The Land Before Time
- Platform: Game Boy Color
- Release: EU: 29 June 2001; NA: 16 July 2001
- Genre: Platform
- Mode: Single-player

The Land Before Time is a 2001 Game Boy Color platform game developed by Eclipse Entertainment Ltd and published by Swing! Entertainment in Europe and Conspiracy Entertainment in North America, based upon the 1988 film of the same name. A separate game featuring the same name was released for the Game Boy Advance by Full Fat in 2002.

== Gameplay ==
A screenshot of The Land Before Time.

The Land Before Time is a 2D platformer where players alternate between a range of selectable characters: Ducky, Littlefoot, Cera, and Spike, from the original film, as they find themselves separated from a rock fall and need to reunite with their friends. Each character performs specific functions, such as squeezing into small spaces, crushing rocks, or defeating enemies, requiring the player to alternate between them as they navigate the levels of the game. The game uses a password system instead of a battery save system to return the player to levels of the game. The game features 20 levels across five environments, ranging from volcanoes, deserts, and swamps.

== Reception ==
Reception

Review scores
Publication	Score
AllGame	2.5/5
Game Boy Xtreme	72%
Total Game Boy	72%

The Land Before Time received mixed reviews. Writing for Game Boy Xtreme, John Hagerty stated the game was "above average" with "decent gameplay", but found frustration with the lack of a restart position and the "complicated attack movements", noting "there's nothing to collect or bad guys to beat in the areas you've already explored". TJ Deci for Allgame wrote that whilst the concept of switching playable characters was "(executed) fairly well", the "gameplay alone isn't enough to overcome the numerous frustrations with the title", including "not being able to save during levels", "the unwieldy password system". Total Game Boy found the game to be "tricky" with "poor collision", making it inappropriate for its target audience of younger players, stating the gameplay was "dull and uninteresting, with no background story".
