= Shrek Swamp Kart Speedway =

2002 video game

- Developer: Prolific Publishing
- Publisher: TDK Mediactive
- Designer: Dave W. Frost
- Platform: Game Boy Advance
- Release: March 19, 2002
- Genre: Racing
- Mode: Single-player

Shrek Swamp Kart Speedway is a kart racing game published by TDK Mediactive released in March 2002 for the Game Boy Advance. The game is based on the Shrek franchise. Players have the option of playing one of twelve Shrek characters, using their racing skills to defeat other racers.

== Gameplay ==
The player can pick from twelve total characters, all of which have different stats that are shown to the user on the selection screen. These three stats are handling, speed and recovery. There are a total of 16 tracks in the game, increasing in difficulty as the game progresses. Eight racers can race at once, and all non-player controlled karts are controlled by the computer. The race begins with a traffic light system and if the player tries to start too early their kart will be slower off the start. On the track there are enchanted books that give the user advantages, such as a temporary speed boost and the ability to shrink other users. However, they can occasionally change to being cursed and instead put the user at a disadvantage, some curses include inverting the steering controls or putting the user's character to sleep leaving them with no control over the kart. Permanent speed boosts can also be found on the ground in all tracks, and some tracks also have alternative routes that are faster. Some tracks also have zones where players can fall off the map or fall into water, which requires the character to reset to get back onto the track and loses a substantial amount of time. Some tracks also have patches or dirt or snow, depending on the biome, which if driven over spin the user out.

Once the race is over a leaderboard is shown of the top three, and shows the time it took for each user to complete the race. If the user finished in the top three they then can move onto the next track.

=== Characters ===
- A dwarf
- Big Bad Wolf
- Donkey
- Gingerbread Man
- Goldilocks
- Lord Farquaad
- Monsieur Hood
- Princess Fiona
- Shrek
- Thelonius
- Three Blind Mice
- Three Little Pigs

=== Tracks and Stages ===
==== Swamp Rally ====
- Shrek's Boggin' Bayou
- Swamp Fever
- Deadwood Dash
- Donkey's Giant Log Morass

==== Forest Run ====
- Three Pigs a Squealin'
- Little Red's Raceway
- Gingerbread Village Dash
- Monsieur's Tree Top Hood

==== Country Hustle ====
- Sunflower Lane
- Windmill Alley
- Goldilocks' Way
- Big Bad Wolf's Autobahn

==== Dragon Strip ====
- Badlands
- Off-Road Suspension Bridge
- Courtyard Lariat
- Parapet Peril

== Development and release ==
Developer Prolific Publishing was based in Burbank, California. Shrek Swamp Kart Speedway was released on March 19, 2002.

== Reception ==
Reception

Aggregate score
Aggregator	Score
Metacritic	27/100

Review scores
Publication	Score
IGN	3/10
Jeuxvideo.com	6/20
Pocket Gamer	1/10

Shrek Swamp Kart Speedway received generally "below average" reviews. The game holds an average of 27% on review aggregator Metacritic. In 2002 Pocket Gamer gave the game a 1/10 for its "boring and cliched beyond belief" gameplay, "choppy scrolling" and "very sloppy" graphics, and three years later cited the game as an example of a "spectacularly bad" kart racer for the Game Boy Advance. Furthermore, it received a 3/10 from IGN's Craig Harris who called the game an "awful Game Boy Advance fairytale" and goes onto to further say that the game was underdeveloped and just another Mario Kart clone.
