= The Haunted Mansion (video game) =

2003 video game

- PAL region cover art
- Developers: High Voltage Software, Pocket Studios (GBA)
- Publishers: NA: TDK Mediactive; EU: Take-Two Interactive (Note: Remains branded under the TDK logo)
- Platforms: PlayStation 2, Xbox, GameCube
- Release: NA: October 16, 2003; EU: March 5, 2004 (PS2, Xbox)
- Genres: Action-adventure, survival horror
- Mode: Single-player

The Haunted Mansion is a 2003 action-adventure video game developed by High Voltage Software and published by TDK Mediactive. The game is based on the Disney ride of the same name, rather than the eponymous film, which was released shortly after the game. However, some elements and set designs from the film are incorporated into the game's version of the mansion.

== Plot ==
A Renaissance influenced nineteenth-century antebellum/Dutch colonial revival mansion located in a bayou nearby New Orleans, Louisiana was a happy home to a family (presumably the Gracey family) as well as it's friendly resident ghosts until evil forces known as the Order of Shadows, led by the evil Atticus Thorn, terrorized the mansion including the family, causing them to abandon their home and forcing all the resident ghosts of the mansion to serve his wills.

Renowned author Ezekiel Holloway (also known as Zeke), spent most of his life in orphanages after his father's death and his mother's disappearance during the Civil War. Sometime later, he went on his own to pursue a career; his true passion was writing as he always dreamed of becoming an author. His desperation in a search for a job to help finance his passion leads him to discover a misleading newspaper advertisement about being a caretaker for the aforementioned mansion.

Making the decision to take the job, he journeys to the mansion on October 17, 1879. Upon examining the mansion on arrival, he is greeted by six friendly ghosts, who are Atticus Thorn's slaves, causing him to faint in horror. When he awakes, Zeke meets a spirit in a crystal ball named Madame Leota, who informs him of the reason he was lured, as well as the mansion's history. Leota reveals that Atticus Thorn has trapped 999 souls in the mansion as part of his attempt to take over the afterlife and should be sent into the Depths of the Afterdeath. During the briefing, she gives him a magic lantern called Beacon of Souls, which can fight off dark forces and destroy the evil for good.

Despite his fears, Zeke agrees to help them and is given the weapon. He travels around the mansion, freeing shriveled ghosts and collecting legendary Soul Gems—the items that power up the Beacon—from the friendly ghosts. During the course of the events, Atticus Thorn, whom Zeke fights four times, watches with sadistic delight.

After fighting dozens of enemies, Zeke eventually gains a pirate's ring that unlocks a passageway to the Vault of Shadows, Atticus Thorn's secret lair behind a painting in the Foyer. Atticus reveals his plan to take over both the Afterlife and the Land of the Living, and he steals the Beacon of Souls from Zeke. Zeke and Leota then face off against Thorn's true form: a giant, worm-like creature. After Atticus dies, Zeke emerges victorious and is thanked by the friendly ghosts. The Haunted Mansion is finally returned to light, and the 999 spirits are set free and move on to heaven. Zeke is employed as the caretaker of the estate and continues to live in harmony with the remaining ghosts along with Madame Leota. He then pursues his dream as a writer and a recognized author under Leota's and the other ghosts' guidance later on.

== Gameplay ==
The gameplay follows a fairly linear path in which the player must collect souls as they explore the mansion, with each room or door having a specifically required number of souls. The various hallways give the player access to a large number of rooms, as well as save points in the form of grandfather clocks. As the player traverses these hallways, they will always encounter enemies which opposes the player's ability to clear rooms permanently of enemies.

Once the player has found and entered a new room, the lights will be out and their main goal is to find the power switch and turn on the lights. Each room will offer a variety of challenges through fighting increasingly difficult enemies and providing unique problem-solving opportunities and puzzles. The enemies the player encounters begin as simple ghosts and small spiders, but will progressively become more difficult deeper into the mansion. Oftentimes, a new enemy is unlocked after having fought them as a "mini-boss" in a particular room. These enemies are extremely varied in style: a giant spider which will shoot webs and pull in Zeke, Banshees which scream and deal damage from a distance, Gargoyles which pull smaller skeletons out of the ground to swarm and defeat the player, and more.

Using their lantern, the player will fight the enemies with various attacks that they unlock from collecting the souls gems present throughout the mansion. Starting with a weak but fast attack, the player will slowly gain a charge shot, as well as an area of effect attack which are then all progressively upgraded a second time to more powerful versions. Additionally, the player has a "bravery" bar which represents their health, and throughout the mansion's rooms the player can find bottles of potions (called "Bravery Tonic") to restore it. Additionally, the player can collect permanent upgrades to their maximum bravery as well as playing cards which will provide one bonus life for every 10 collected. When the player's bravery bar is depleted, instead of returning a previous save, a life will be consumed and Zeke will be restored to full health.

The room design throughout the mansion uses a variety of mechanics, but is often rooted in a 3d platforming aspect. There are many examples of this, such as rooms where the bookcases will move around or float, and the player must make a series of jumps in order to successfully reach the light switch. A more unique example is seen in the Observatory in which the player looks through the telescope and is transported in to space, having to make a series of jumps in low gravity traversing various pieces of rubble.

When not focusing on platforming, the player can expect to see unique puzzles or challenges such as being shrunk down and placed onto a billiards table, while a ghostly hand takes shots at them with the cue ball. The player then uses this to their advantage to successfully hit all the other billiards balls into pockets in order to escape this puzzle and continue on. Another example could be the kitchen, in which a stack of plates is steadily flinging themselves at the player. The player must then position themselves so the plates break various bottles of alcohol, at the end igniting and following the trail of alcohol to the fireplace which then lights the room.

The mansion is often set up in a way where the player can access up to 4 rooms at a time, and while collecting the souls from each room they will receive fragments of death certificates, which would be presented to the six friendly ghosts. After having collected all these fragments, they will then have enough souls to access a room in which they encounter a difficult puzzle or combat scenario. Upon completion of this scenario, the main villain will appear and fight Zeke, disappearing after Zeke has drained his health bar. After his temporary defeat of the villain, the friendly ghost will appear and Zeke will present the death certificate to them. A brief cutscene will then occur in which the ghost will present Zeke with a new soul gem, unlocking a new type of attack with his lantern and providing 100 extra souls.

This gameplay cycle will repeat until Zeke has collected all 6 soul gems (with the sixth being embedded in a ring), which allows him access to the final boss room. The final battle consists of 2 phases which function very similarly. As the main villain has turned himself into a worm-like creature by stealing the soul gems, Zeke puts his companion's crystal ball into the lantern and unlocks a special rapid fire shot which will fire just by holding down the attack button. The villain will steadily launch fireballs at Zeke, and lean down to bite him if the player comes within range. After taking enough damage, the villain will then begin to reveal the gem on his abdomen, which will begin to charge and fire a deadly beam attack that can deal more than half the player's health. In order to stop this the player must target the gem, dealing extra damage as well as preventing the damaging attack. After having depleted the villain's health bar, the floor will break and the player will find themselves in lava filled cavern, having to jump from platform to platform around the villain. Additionally, the villain now has 2 extra attacks: he has 3 large tentacles which he will raise up and then slam down, and a sweeping fire breath. After the player has successfully dodged the attacks, and destroyed the villain, a cutscene will ensue and the game ends.

== Game Boy Advance version ==
A Game Boy Advance version with 3D graphics was planned for release around the same time as the console versions but was scrapped due to its publisher being bought out by Take-Two Interactive. The protagonist of the console versions, Zeke, is not present in this version and in his place is Yazz, a young woman who is searching the mansion for her lost friends Cyrus and Rikki. Though the game's release was cancelled, it has since leaked online.

== Reception ==
Reception

Aggregate score
Aggregator	Score		
Aggregator	GameCube	PS2	Xbox
Metacritic	69/100	69/100	71/100

Review scores
Publication	Score		
Publication	GameCube	PS2	Xbox
Edge	N/A	6/10	N/A
Eurogamer	N/A	6/10	N/A
Famitsu	N/A	29/40	N/A
Game Informer	N/A	N/A	7/10
GamePro	3.5/5	N/A	N/A
GameSpot	7/10	7/10	7/10
GameZone	N/A	N/A	7/10
IGN	7/10	7/10	7/10
Nintendo Power	3.7/5	N/A	N/A
Official U.S. PlayStation Magazine	N/A	3/5	N/A
Official Xbox Magazine (US)	N/A	N/A	8.3/10

The game received "average" reviews on all platforms according to the review aggregation website Metacritic. In Japan, Famitsu gave the PlayStation 2 version a score of three sevens and one eight for a total of 29 out of 40.
