= Anne Kuljian =

Set decorator

- Born: June 17, 1949 (age 76); Los Angeles, California
- Occupation: Set decorator
- Years active: 1982-present

Anne Louise Kuljian (born June 17, 1949) is a set decorator. She was nominated for an Academy Award in the category Best Art Direction for the film The Abyss.

== Filmography ==
- The Silence (short) (1982)
- Fatal Games (1984)
- Tuff Turf (1985)
- Runaway Train (1985)
- Native Son (1986)
- Cherry 2000 (1987)
- Stars and Bars (1988)
- A Time of Destiny (1988)
- Heartbreak Hotel (1988)
- The Abyss (1989)
- Flatliners (1990)
- What About Bob? (1991)
- Basic Instinct (1992)
- Clean Slate (1994)
- Now and Then (1995)
- The Crow: City of Angels (1996)
- One Fine Day (1996)
- Sphere (1998)
- Bicentennial Man (1999)
- Remember the Titans (2000)
- Minority Report (2002)
- Equilibrium (2002)
- The Cat in the Hat (2003)
- The Terminal (2004)
- War of the Worlds (2005)
- Mr. Brooks (2007)
- The Mummy: Tomb of the Dragon Emperor (2008)
- Green Lantern (2011)
- Man of Steel (2013)
- Divergent (2014)
- X-Men: Apocalypse (2016)
- Geostorm (2017)
- Mulan (2020)
- The Falcon and the Winter Soldier (2021)
