= The Muppets: On With the Show! =

2003 video game

The Muppets: On with the Show!
- Developer: Activision (Windows) Vicarious Visions (GBA)
- Publisher: TDK Mediactive
- Platforms: Microsoft Windows, Game Boy Advance
- Release: 2003
- Genre: Action

The Muppets: On With the Show! is a 2003 video game developed by Activision for Microsoft Windows and Vicarious Visions for the Game Boy Advance, and published by TDK Mediactive on both platforms. It is a collection of action-based minigames in which players help members of The Muppets complete various tasks within a time limit. Upon release, On With the Show! received mixed reviews, with critics faulting the game's lack of minigame variety, complex goals, and a save system, although characterising it as a simple budget title.

== Gameplay ==
Game Boy Advance gameplay screenshot, featuring Swedish Chef.

On With the Show! is a collection of eight minigames, each featuring a character from The Muppets. The game has two modes: Activity mode, in which the minigames can be played individually, or Story Mode, in which the minigames can be played in sequence, with completion unlocking two additional minigames. The game uses a password-based save system to continue the Story Mode and access unlocked minigames. 'Electric Mayhem' is a rhythm game. 'Swedish Chef's Cooking Hour' requires players as Swedish Chef to slap away rats from the Chef's counter using a pot. 'Kermit's Banjo Bayou', a variation of Frogger, requires players as Kermit the Frog to cross a body of water avoiding oncoming penguins, Fozzie Bear, and Miss Piggy.

== Reception ==
Reception

Aggregate score
Aggregator	Score
Metacritic	65%

Review scores
Publication	Score
AllGame	3/5
Game Informer	5.5/10
GameSpy	6.5/10
IGN	7/10
Nintendo Power	3.6/5

According to review aggregator Metacritic, On With the Show! received "mixed or average" reviews. Critics were mixed on the merit of the various minigames on offer, and critiqued the absence of a save system. Scott Alan Marriott of Allgame enjoyed their "simple but engaging" nature, but considered some "painfully easy", lacking meaningful objectives or high scores, and the game overall not having replay value, particularly due to the omission of save games. Describing the game as "fun, cheap and replayable", Brian Davis of GameSpy liked the game's humour, visual presentation and sound effects, but similarly faulted the game's short length and lack of a save system. Writing that the games "just aren't much fun", Game Informer critiqued the game for featuring "sub-par minigames". Electronic Gaming Monthly critiqued the controls, stating that the characters controlled by players "take little or no interest in the directional commands you input".
