= The Abyss: Incident at Europa =

1998 video game

- Developer: Sound Source Interactive
- Publisher: Sound Source Interactive
- Platform: Windows
- Release: October 1, 1998
- Genre: Adventure
- Mode: Single-player

The Abyss: Incident at Europa is a 1998 adventure video game by Sound Source Interactive, based on James Cameron's 1989 science fiction film The Abyss.

The game, set six years after the film, is a real-time adventure game played from the first person perspective.

== Reception ==
Retro Gaming Magazine suggested "the game’s not as terrible as many people make it out to be". PC Joker gave the game a rating of 39% and GamesMania gave it 40%. PC Gamer said "the level of frustration will quickly turn off a lot of inexperienced gamers." Just Adventure felt the level of shooting was too little for action fans but too much for adventure fans.

CD-Action wrote "The Abyss is second to none and will surprise you with its fineness". Power Play Magazine thought the game was enriched by "unusual" puzzles and action elements.

== See also ==
- List of underwater science fiction works
