= No Rules: Get Phat =

2001 video game

- North American box art
- Developer: Flying Tiger Development
- Publisher: TDK Mediactive
- Platform: Game Boy Advance
- Release: NA: November 26, 2001; PAL: November 30, 2001
- Genres: Action, platform
- Mode: Single-player

No Rules: Get Phat is a 2001 action video game developed by Flying Tiger Development and published by TDK Mediactive for the Game Boy Advance. It is a licensed video game based on the No Rules line of clothing. Upon release, Get Phat received mixed reviews.

== Gameplay ==
Players assume the role of No Rules mascot and skater One Eye Jack, whose day is interrupted by aliens who invade his home town. Get Phat is a platform game that features several modes. In Skateboarding and Snowboarding Mode, players skate across a side-scrolling perspective over five levels. The objective of this mode is to navigate each level across a skateboard or snowboard, defeat aliens using a slingshot, and avoid hazards. Extra lives and first aid kits to restore health can be collected. In Mixin' Mode, players complete a minigame where they match a pattern combination.

== Development ==
No Rules: Get Phat was showcased by publisher TDK Mediactive at E3 in May 2001.

== Reception ==
Reception

Review scores
Publication	Score
IGN	3/10
Nintendo Power	2.4/5
GBA Master Guide	71%
Game Boy Xtreme	42%
Total Game Boy	73%

Stating that the game succeeded neither as a platformer or a skateboarding game, Total Game Boy considered the game repetitive and lacked replayability. Game Boy Xtreme considered the game was fun as a mix of sports and platforming gameplay, but faulted the controls as "poorly designed" and the collision detection as "shoddy". Nintendo Power wrote that the game "falls flat" overall, finding its action gameplay "frustrating". The GBA Master Guide enjoyed the "unique graphical style" of Get Phat, but critiqued its "hit and miss" soundtrack, unresponsive controls and unclear level design.
