= Dinotopia (video game) =

1996 video game

- Developer: The Dreamers Guild
- Publisher: Turner Interactive
- Platform: MS-DOS
- Release: 1996
- Genre: Adventure
- Mode: Single-player

Dinotopia is a 1996 adventure game developed by The Dreamers Guild and published by Turner Interactive for MS-DOS. It is based on the Dinotopia book series by James Gurney.

== Gameplay ==
Dinotopia features a young man, Nathan, searching for his sister Constance in an island inhabited by both humans and dinosaurs. He arrives to the island after a storm broke his ship and separated him from his sister. The island dinosaurs are intelligent and have a language of their own that the player must learn in order to complete the challenges and tasks in the game and eventually find his sister.

== Development and release ==
Dinotopia was developed by The Dreamers Guild and published by Turner Interactive. The game features cutscenes with live actors, as well as animatronic dinosaurs created by Andre Freitas and his special effects company, AFX Studios. Turner gave Freitas a small budget of $85,000. Dinotopia was released in 1996.

== Reception ==
Reception

Review scores
Publication	Score
Next Generation	3/5
Entertainment Weekly	A
Just Adventure	C

Scorpia of Computer Gaming World found it too simplistic and wrote, "This isn't so much a game as a Dinotopia travelogue". Next Generation stated, "All told, this is only a slightly above-average adventure title. The story is nothing special, and the puzzles won't be a serious challenge to hard-core players. It would make a great light hearted adventure to play with kids." Dennis Michael of CNN wrote "its apt combination of intellect and humanity makes the game a winner for new players looking for something to share with the family".

Popular Science praised the game's high production values, noting its use of 3D graphics, motion video, and "lifelike" dinosaur puppets. It was also praised for having a "warm and inviting atmosphere" and "a storyline worth following". Steven Forbis, writing for Entertainment Weekly, praised the game for its "lively characters, humor, and the island's day-to-day life".

Simone de Rochefort of Polygon praised the game in 2021, calling it "delightful and weird" and the puppets "incredible".

== Reviews ==
- Quandary (Jul, 1996)
