= Dinotopia: The Timestone Pirates =

2002 video game

- Developer: RFX Interactive
- Publisher: TDK Mediactive
- Engine: Proprietary
- Platform: Game Boy Advance
- Release: NA: April 30, 2002; EU: October 18, 2002
- Genre: Action
- Mode: Single-player

Dinotopia: The Timestone Pirates is a platform based video game for Nintendo Game Boy Advance, developed by RFX Interactive and published by TDK Mediactive. It is set in James Gurney's Dinotopia.

== Plot ==
Clayton has finished his Skybax training when his friends Hyla, a human female, and Krekor, a Hadrosaur, inform him of a threat to Dinotopia. A band of pirates are stealing and hiding Tyrannosaurus eggs all over the island, attempting to draw the creatures from their nesting grounds so they can search for an artifact of some sort. Clayton is given a Sunstone Prod, a device similar to a staff, to use against the pirates as he hunts for the eggs.

As the game progresses, it becomes apparent that the pirates are after the Timestone, a mythical artifact said to slow time around whoever holds it. Clayton must race to find all of the remaining eggs and locate the Timestone before the pirates do.

Each level takes place in a different part of Dinotopia. After three sections of each level, Clayton faces an extra challenge, usually a boss to fight, and then must return the eggs he recovered to the Tyrannosaur nesting area without getting killed before proceeding to the next level.

== Gameplay ==
For the first two levels Clayton uses his Sunstone Prod with three different sunstones: Laser Sunstone, which shoots a laser at enemies, Flash Sunstone, which temporarily blinds enemies, and Earthquake sunstone, which eliminates all visible enemies. Clayton can also swing the Prod like a club at close range.

At the third level, the gameplay changes as Clayton flies in Canyon City, pilots the Remora underwater and runs with Kreekor in the Diamond Caverns. In the final challenges of the second and fifth levels, Clayton must use his prod against his mechanized enemies, but cannot use any sunstones.

== Reception ==
Reception

Aggregate scores
Aggregator	Score
GameRankings	59.22%
Metacritic	64/100

Review scores
Publication	Score
AllGame	3/5
Game Informer	6/10
GameSpot	5.8/10
GameSpy	64%
GameZone	7.1/10
Nintendo Power	2.8/5

The game was met with mixed reception, as GameRankings gave it a score of 59.22% while Metacritic gave it a score of 64 out of 100.
