= Dinotopia: The Sunstone Odyssey =

2003 video game

- PAL region Xbox cover art
- Developer: Vicious Cycle Software
- Publishers: NA: TDK Mediactive; EU: Global Star Software
- Platforms: GameCube, Xbox
- Release: NA: July 31, 2003; PAL: April 16, 2004 (Xbox)
- Genre: Action-adventure
- Mode: Single-player

Dinotopia: The Sunstone Odyssey is a 2003 action-adventure video game released by Vicious Cycle Software for GameCube and Xbox. It is based on the Dinotopia book series.

Dinotopia: The Sunstone Odyssey follows the story of Drake Gemini, his twin brother Jacob, and their father, who have been stranded on Dinotopia for 10 years. At the beginning of the game, Drake and Jacob's father is attacked and eaten by a rogue Tyrannosaurus while exploring the outer jungles of Dinotopia. After the killing, Drake and Jacob begin to go their separate ways, with Jacob joining a gang of dinosaur-hating humans called the Outsiders and Drake choosing to take on the role of a guardian of Dinotopia.

== Reception ==
Reception

Aggregate scores
Aggregator	Score	
Aggregator	GameCube	Xbox
GameRankings	53%	47.97%
Metacritic	50/100	44/100

Review scores
Publication	Score	
Publication	GameCube	Xbox
Game Informer		3.25/10
GameSpot	4.7/10	4.7/10
GameZone		5/10
Nintendo Power	2.5/5	
Nintendo World Report	5/10	
Official Xbox Magazine (UK)		5.8/10
TeamXbox		5.6/10

The game was met with mixed to negative reception, as GameRankings and Metacritic gave it a score of 53% and 50 out of 100, respectively, for the GameCube version, and 47.97% and 44 out of 100 for the Xbox version.
