= Shrek Super Party =

2002 video game

- European GameCube box art
- Developer: Mass Media
- Publisher: TDK Mediactive
- Composer: Chris Tilton
- Series: Shrek
- Platforms: PlayStation 2, GameCube, Xbox
- Release: PlayStation 2: NA: November 14, 2002; PAL: February 14, 2003; Xbox: NA: November 14, 2002; PAL: November 29, 2002; GameCube: PAL: May 30, 2003; NA: June 5, 2003
- Genre: Party
- Modes: Single-player, multiplayer

Shrek Super Party is a party video game released in 2002 by Mass Media. The game is based on the Shrek films.

== Gameplay ==
The characters Shrek, Fiona, Donkey, Lord Farquaad, Thelonious, and Monsieur Hood are available for play. Five realms are available for play, each with its own mini-games: The Keep, The Windmill, The Swamp, The Castle, and The Farm. The cover features four colored castles and four characters Shrek, Donkey, Princess Fiona, and Lord Farquaad. Some are team games and the teams are always restricted to P1/P3 vs P2/P4.

The purpose of the game Shrek Super Party is to be the first player to collect a certain number of "Precious Drops". This number can be preset in the "game settings" menu at the beginning of the game as anything between 200 and 800 in intervals of 100. The drops can be collected through making bug matches or by reaching "Realm Caches".

== Reception ==
Reception

Aggregate scores
Aggregator	Score		
Aggregator	GameCube	PS2	Xbox
GameRankings	44.25%	46.56%	39.07%
Metacritic	40/100	30/100	33/100

Review scores
Publication	Score		
Publication	GameCube	PS2	Xbox
AllGame	2.5/5	N/A	2.5/5
Computer and Video Games	N/A	N/A	4/10
Electronic Gaming Monthly	N/A	N/A	2/10
Game Informer	N/A	N/A	3.25/10
IGN	3.8/10	2.9/10	3/10
Nintendo Power	2.2/5	N/A	N/A
Official U.S. PlayStation Magazine	N/A	2.5/5	N/A
Official Xbox Magazine (US)	N/A	N/A	3.9/10
TeamXbox	N/A	N/A	4/10

The game was met with negative reviews upon release. GameRankings and Metacritic gave it a score of 47% and 30 out of 100 for the PlayStation 2 version; 44% and 40 out of 100 for the GameCube version; and 39% and 33 out of 100 for the Xbox version.
