= Dinotopia =

Fantasy book series

- Dinotopia: A Land Apart from Time by James Gurney
- See list of books in series
- Author: James Gurney, various
- Translator: Various
- Illustrator: Various
- Cover artist: Various
- Country: United States
- Language: English
- Genre: Children's, Fantasy novel
- Media type: Print (Hardback & Paperback)

Dinotopia is a series of illustrated fantasy books, created by author and illustrator James Gurney. It is set in the titular Dinotopia, an isolated island inhabited by shipwrecked humans and sapient dinosaurs who have learned to coexist peacefully as a single symbiotic society. The first book was published in 1992 and has "appeared in 18 languages in more than 30 countries and sold two million copies." Dinotopia: A Land Apart from Time and Dinotopia: The World Beneath both won Hugo Awards for best original artwork. The original work won the Locus Award for Best Non-fiction in 1993, a point at which the Locus Awards did not have a category for illustrated works.

Since its original publication, over twenty Dinotopia books have been published by various authors to expand the series.

A live-action television miniseries, a short-lived live-action TV series, a 2005 animated film, and several video games have also been released.

== Background ==
Gurney's assignments for National Geographic required him to work with archaeologists to envision and paint ancient cities that no one alive today has ever seen. This inspired him to imagine his own, so he painted "Waterfall City" and "Dinosaur parade". These were originally done as art prints for collectors. He later decided to create an imaginary island based on these paintings.

Gurney used "plein-air studies, thumbnail sketches, models photographed in costume and original cardboard or clay maquettes" to create 150 oil paintings for his 2007 Dinotopia book. He called "Dinotopia" a portmanteau of "dinosaur" and "utopia".

== Series overview ==
Dinotopia began as an illustrated children's book called Dinotopia: A Land Apart from Time. It was a cross-over success, appealing to both children and adult readers. The book's success led James Gurney to write and illustrate three more books called Dinotopia: The World Beneath, Dinotopia: First Flight and Dinotopia: Journey to Chandara. They all deal with the adventures of Arthur and Will Denison to one degree or another. These are considered the main books of the series and establish the fictional world in which the others are set. Gurney keeps abreast with recent paleontological discoveries and has written then-newly discovered dinosaurs into his books, for example, including Giganotosaurus in The World Beneath and Microraptor and other feathered dinosaurs in Journey to Chandara.

A children's flip-up version of the first book was also issued. The Dinotopia Digest series consists of sixteen young adult novels penned by several different authors. These books feature other characters who are not specifically involved with the events of the main books, although characters from the main books (particularly the Denisons) have appeared in minor or cameo roles. Two full-length adult fantasy novels were also issued with Gurney's authority, written by Alan Dean Foster: Dinotopia Lost and The Hand of Dinotopia.

Several video games, as well as a TV miniseries, a short-lived TV series, and an animated children's movie, were also produced. These are also set in the Dinotopia universe, but do not tie in directly with the main series. Most of them take place in the modern era, unlike the books, which are mostly set in the mid-19th century.

== Main characters ==
- Arthur Denison – An American scientist and the main protagonist of the books. Following the death of his wife Rachel in 1860 he and his son Will left their home Boston on a voyage of discovery. In 1862 they were both washed up on the island of Dinotopia after being shipwrecked.
- Will Denison – The son of Arthur Denison and the second main protagonist of the books. During his time on the island he met and fell in love with local Dinotopian girl, Sylvia Romano and eventually trained to be a Skybax Rider and was partnered with a Skybax (a fictional species of Quetzalcoatlus) named Cirrus.
- Bix – A Protoceratops polyglot who works as an ambassador and eventually becomes the good friend and traveling partner of Arthur Denison, having accompanied him to the World Beneath and Chandara.
- Sylvia Romano – A Dinotopian girl who lives in the Hatchery with her parents Giorgio and Maria. Eventually she became a Skybax Rider with Will and was partnered with a Skybax named Nimbus. Although they share a mutual romantic interest, they agree to wait until they are older to pursue it.
- Lee Crabb – The main antagonist of the books. He was washed up on Dinotopia in 1853, however unlike most arrivals, Crabb despised the island and ever since had been plotting a means of escape. It is Crabb who points out that although Dinotopia's name is usually interpreted to mean "an utopia of dinosaurs", it technically translates to "terrible place".
- Oriana Nascava – A musician who lives in Waterfall City who accompanied Arthur during his return trip to the World Beneath. At the end of the book she and Arthur are implied to have become romantically involved.
- Nallab – The assistant librarian of the library of Waterfall City and Will Denison's closest human friend in Dinotopia.
- Brokenhorn – A well respected Triceratops elder who is the son of the famous Greyback the Wise.
- Oolu – Oolu is the chief Skybax instructor at Canyon City, where he trains the Skybax Riders, Dinotopia's premier messengers and scouts.
- Gideon Altaire – The main protagonist of The First Flight, an inhabitant of the legendary city of Poseidos thousands of years before the rest of the series. He establishes the traditions that eventually lead to the institution of the Skybax Riders.

== Main books ==
Dinotopia written in Dinotopian script

The plot of the main Dinotopia books concerns Arthur Denison and his son, Will, and the various people they meet in their travels in Dinotopia. In the fashion of authors such as Edgar Rice Burroughs, the first and fourth books are written as if they were Arthur's journals, with Gurney going so far as to explain in the introductions how he happened to come across the old, waterlogged volumes.

=== A Land Apart from Time ===
In Dinotopia: A Land Apart from Time (1992), the Denisons are shipwrecked near Dinotopia and, after making it ashore, are found by the people of the Hatchery. The Hatchery is a place where dinosaurs are born, tended by both dinosaurs and humans. The Denisons then set out to explore the island, hoping to find a means of returning to their old lives.

Arthur and Will undergo a broad journey, circling the island, as they endeavor to learn the customs and culture of their new neighbors. Arthur in particular develops an interest in the scientific accomplishments of the natives, which far exceed that of any human culture. Among the subjects he studies are the flora of the island, the partnership of its inhabitants, and the existence of a place known as the World Beneath. This World Beneath is an explanation for Dinotopians surviving the saurian extinction; according to the story, most of the Earth's dinosaurs were destroyed, whilst a few hid in vast caverns. These few became the original Dinotopians. No one has entered the World Beneath for centuries, but Arthur intends to do so.

His son Will, on the other hand, has chosen to train as a messenger of the sky; a Skybax rider, who lives in symbiosis with his mount, the great Quetzalcoatlus (nicknamed Skybax), a species of pterosaur. Training alongside Will is a girl called Sylvia, with whom Will falls in love. Arthur, for his part, travels into the World Beneath, at the same time that Will and Sylvia are learning to fly with the Skybax. When he returns, he is fascinated by the ancient relics found there and is convinced that they may be key in enabling him to leave or explore the island. Will is at the time too young to marry Sylvia, but it is promised that they will. Arthur recognizes that his son has grown up, and they each accept the changes that are results of their new lives on the island.

=== The World Beneath ===
Cover of Dinotopia: The World Beneath.

The first sequel, Dinotopia: The World Beneath (1995) opens with Will fly testing an invention of his father, the Dragoncopter – a steam engine ornithopter modeled on the dragonfly. The Dragoncopter fails and Will is narrowly saved by Cirrus, his Skybax mount, before the Dragoncopter plummets into a waterfall. Frustrated by the Dragoncopter's failure and determined to bring the Industrial Revolution to Dinotopia, Arthur decides to mount a return expedition to the World Beneath. Joined by Bix, Lee Crabb, and newcomer Oriana, who has her own mysterious connection to the caves, Arthur hopes to find a power greater than steam.

Meanwhile, Will and Sylvia join a more conventional expedition to the Rainy Basin and learn that the territorial tyrannosaurids who live there are protecting something - perhaps the very thing that Arthur seeks below the surface. As the two expeditions press on, both learn that Dinotopia's history is more complex than it appears, and regardless of how you view technology, there are some secrets that are best left buried.

=== First Flight ===
Cover of Dinotopia: First Flight.

Dinotopia: First Flight (1999) was a prequel published by Gurney and included a board game.

Thousands of years ago, the city of Poseidos harnessed the power of the Sunstones to create mechanical replacements for all organic life (except humans). After discovering an injured Scaphognathus named Razzamult, a flight school student named Gideon Altair learned that the city planned to launch an attack on the mainland and conquer all of Dinotopia. Worse, Poseidos had stolen the Ruby Sunstone, the most powerful and dangerous of all Sunstones, from the pterosaur home of Highnest. Working to stop the city's march of mechanized conquest and restore balance between humans and dinosaurs, Gideon eventually becomes the first ever Skybax rider (although his partner, Avatar, seems to be a different species of Quetzalcoatlus).

=== Journey to Chandara ===
Cover of Dinotopia: Journey to Chandara.

A fourth Dinotopia book by James Gurney, Dinotopia: Journey to Chandara, was published in October 2007. In it, Hugo Khan, the mysterious and reclusive emperor of Chandara, an empire long since isolated from the rest of Dinotopia, has heard of Arthur Denison and Bix's exploits and sends them a personal invitation to his court.

== Other books in the series ==
From 1995, James Gurney worked with a number of other authors on a series of short novels for children using the Dinotopia characters and themes, published by Random House:

1. Windchaser by Scott Ciencin (ISBN 978-0-7857-9959-7)
2. River Quest by John Vornholt (ISBN 978-0-09-965931-0)
3. Hatchling by Midori Snyder (ISBN 978-0-679-86984-9)
4. Lost City by Scott Ciencin (ISBN 978-0-375-81018-3)
5. Sabertooth Mountain by John Vornholt (ISBN 978-0-679-88095-0)
6. Thunder Falls by Scott Ciencin (ISBN 978-0-679-88256-5)
7. Firestorm by Gene De Weese (ISBN 978-0-679-88619-8)
8. The Maze by Peter David (ISBN 978-0-679-88264-0)
9. Rescue Party by Mark A. Garland (ISBN 978-0-679-89107-9)
10. Sky Dance by Scott Ciencin (ISBN 978-0-375-80417-5)
11. Chomper by Don Glut (ISBN 978-0-679-89109-3)
12. Return to Lost City by Scott Ciencin (ISBN 978-0-375-81018-3)
13. Survive! by Brad Strickland (ISBN 978-0-375-81108-1)
14. The Explorers by Scott Ciencin (ISBN 978-0-375-81396-2)
15. Dolphin Watch by John Vornholt (ISBN 978-0-375-81562-1)
16. Oasis by Cathy Hapka (ISBN 978-0-375-82295-7)
17. Dinotopia Lost by Alan Dean Foster (ISBN 978-0-441-00921-3)
18. The Hand of Dinotopia by Alan Dean Foster (ISBN 978-0-06-051851-6)

== Other media ==
=== Film ===
A traditionally animated movie called Dinotopia: Quest for the Ruby Sunstone was released straight-to-video in 2005. It featured the voices of Alyssa Milano as 26 the Chasmosaurus, Malcolm McDowell as Ogthar, Jamie Kennedy as Spazz the Dilophosaurus, Michael Clarke Duncan as Stinktooth the Tyrannosaurus, Kathy Griffin as Rhoga the Parasaurolophus, Wayne Knight as Thudd the Euoplocephalus, George Segal as Albagon the Dryosaurus, Diedrich Bader as John, Tara Strong as Mara, and Alec Medlock as Kex Bradley. It was also the first and only acting role of hip-hop artist Rollin Woodford (Ro Morikawa).

A few critics have claimed that some scenes in the 1999 film Star Wars: Episode I – The Phantom Menace (particularly those in the city of Theed on Naboo) unfairly copy images from Gurney's books. Gurney acknowledges the resemblance but has remained positive about it. In 1994, director George Lucas had met with producers to discuss some of the concepts and visuals behind a Dinotopia movie that was never made.

=== Television ===
==== TV miniseries ====
A 2002 four-hour TV miniseries produced by Hallmark Entertainment was also based on James Gurney's work, and was advertised as the first "mega-series" (3-night series). The show featured new characters such as Zippo (changed to Zippeau for the TV series to avoid legal issues with the lighter maker Zippo), a Stenonychosaurus who is said to have worked with Sylvia; the sunstones, a technology restricted to the lost city of Poseidos in the books, are commonplace in the miniseries. The failure both of the sunstones and of Dinotopian officials to adhere to the underlying meanings of their culture's philosophy caused several discontented people – a leader-in-training, Zippeau himself, and two twentieth-century Dolphinbacks, Karl and David – to embark on a quest that led ultimately to the World Beneath. The series is presented as a sequel of sorts to the books: Will Denison's daughter followed her father into the Skybax corps (an order acknowledged to be founded by Gideon Altaire), Oriana's granddaughter is the female protagonist, the character Zippo is said to have been the dinosaur partner of Sylvia (here the Nursery overseer and not a Skybax rider), and Lee Crabb's son Cyrus features as the antagonist.

==== TV series ====
A TV series of thirteen episodes was produced later in 2002 as a result of the success of the miniseries, but none of the cast of the miniseries reprised their roles. In the later TV series, a group of people known as Outsiders live outside the laws of Dinotopia and pose an additional danger aside from the featured antagonists, which include Pteranodon, Tyrannosaurus, and Postosuchus.

The US broadcaster ABC originally planned to launch the series in September 2002, but decided to wait until Thanksgiving. ABC was somewhat disappointed by the initial 5.7 million viewers and the poor ratings, but continued to air the series for a little while longer, pointing out that it had been an "odd viewing night overall." The series was finally canceled in December. Only six of the thirteen episodes were aired on ABC, but all thirteen were broadcast the following year in Europe and were released onto a three-disc DVD box set.

Science-fiction veteran David Winning directed two episodes of the series, and location shooting lasted for three months near Budapest, Hungary. Georgina Rylance played Marion Waldo, and Lisa Zane portrayed her old friend LeSage, the leader of the Outsiders. Michael Brandon, Jonathan Hyde, and Erik von Detten also star in the series. The series ended with a cliffhanger.

Artisan Entertainment released the complete series on DVD in Region 1 for the first time on 20 January 2004. This release has been discontinued and is out of print. On 15 March 2016, Mill Creek Entertainment re-released the complete series on DVD in Region 1.

=== Video games ===
A number of Dinotopia video games have been produced:

- Dinotopia (PC: 1995)
- Dinotopia Game Land Activity Center (PC/Mac: 2002)
- Dinotopia: The Timestone Pirates (Game Boy Advance: 2002)
- Dinotopia: The Sunstone Odyssey (GameCube/Xbox: 2003)
