= Shrek: Fairy Tale Freakdown =

2001 video game

- Developer: Prolific
- Publisher: TDK Mediactive
- Producer: Matthew Miller
- Designer: Derek W. Frost
- Programmer: John Harvey
- Artist: Edgar C. Tolentino
- Composer: John Harvey
- Platform: Game Boy Color
- Release: NA: May 29, 2001; UK: July 6, 2001
- Genres: Action, fighting
- Mode: Single-player

Shrek: Fairy Tale Freakdown is an action fighting video game developed by Prolific and published by TDK Mediactive for the Game Boy Color. Based on the 2001 animated film, it released in North America on May 29, 2001, and in the United Kingdom on July 6, 2001.

== Gameplay ==
Shrek: Fairy Tale Freakdown is a 2D action fighting game in which a player controlled character and an AI controlled character use offensive and defensive attacks, with the goal of depleting their opponent's health. If the player defeats the enemy, they will be presented with a password, which can be entered into the password menu on the main screen to play from their current position in the game. Upon completing all 9 stages, the player is granted the rank of champion.

Alongside the 'Play Game' mode, is the 'Practice' mode, in which the player is given the option of practicing their attacks on a stationary enemy on a randomly selected stage. In this mode, the opponent character will never move or attack the player, and will regenerate health when not in combat for a few moments.

=== Characters ===
Of the 9 total playable characters in the game, 6 are playable from the start, and the other 3 must first be unlocked by defeating them in combat.

- Shrek
- Wolf
- Pinocchio
- Monsieur Robin Hood
- Princess Fiona
- Thelonius
- Ginger Bread Man (unlocked after Dungeon)
- The Dragon (unlocked after Bridge)
- Lord Farquaad (unlocked after Mirror Room)

== Reception ==
Reception

Aggregate score
Aggregator	Score
GameRankings	36%

Review scores
Publication	Score
AllGame	1.5/5
Game Informer	0.5/10
GameSpot	4.9/10

The game received generally negative reviews according to the review aggregation website GameRankings. The game has been criticized for its lack of moves, strategy, and a two-player mode. Game Informer described the game as "handheld misery" and suggested that Satan himself crafted it.

By October 2001, Shrek: Fairy Tale Freakdown shipped 100,000 units across Europe.
