= Shrek: Hassle at the Castle =

2002 video game

- Developer: Tose Co., Ltd.
- Publisher: TDK Mediactive
- Platform: Game Boy Advance
- Release: NA: October 8, 2002; EU: November 15, 2002
- Genre: Fighting
- Mode: Single-player

Shrek: Hassle at the Castle is a 2D beat 'em up video game released in 2002 for the Game Boy Advance. It is based on the 2001 movie Shrek, and features characters from it. It is the only game in the franchise that follows the plot of the first movie. A sequel, Shrek: Reekin' Havoc, was released in 2003.

== Gameplay ==
Gameplay consists of 2D platforming and beat 'em up combat. Players progress through the game as Shrek, Princess Fiona, and Donkey. They travel through 24 stages of the game that represent different scenes of the movie.

The game also offers a multiplayer mode, where up to four players fight in an enclosed side-scrolling arena. Players must collect the most coins and knock them out of the possession of their opponents. The game's multiplayer allows for up to four players via the Link Cable accessory and multi-cart support.

== Reception ==
Reception

Aggregate scores
Aggregator	Score
GameRankings	68.50%
Metacritic	71/100

Review scores
Publication	Score
AllGame	3.5/5
GameSpy	2/5
IGN	7/10
Nintendo Power	3.5/5

The game was met with average reception upon release, as GameRankings gave it a score of 68.50%, while Metacritic gave it 71 out of 100.
