= List of Xbox Live games on Windows Phone =

This is a list of released Xbox Live enabled games for Windows Phone.

== List ==
Title	Developer	Publisher	North America	Europe	Asia
Abyss	Space Inch	Game Troopers	Yes	Yes	Yes
Age of Empires: Castle Siege	Smoking Gun Interactive	Microsoft Studios	Yes	Yes	Yes
Age of Sparta	Gameloft	Gameloft	Yes	Yes	Yes
AlphaJax (Removed from store)	Marker Metro	Microsoft Studios	Cancelled	Cancelled	Cancelled
Amazing Alex (Removed from store)	Rovio Entertainment	Rovio Entertainment	Cancelled	Cancelled	Cancelled
Angry Birds (Removed from store)	Rovio Entertainment	Microsoft Studios	Cancelled	Cancelled	Cancelled
Angry Birds Classic (Removed from store)	Rovio Entertainment	Rovio Entertainment	Cancelled	Cancelled	Cancelled
Angry Birds Rio (Removed from store)	Rovio Entertainment	Rovio Entertainment	Cancelled	Cancelled	Cancelled
Angry Birds Seasons (Removed from store)	Rovio Entertainment	Rovio Entertainment	Cancelled	Cancelled	Cancelled
Angry Birds Space (Removed from store)	Rovio Entertainment	Rovio Entertainment	Cancelled	Cancelled	Cancelled
Angry Birds Star Wars (Removed from store)	Rovio Entertainment	Rovio Entertainment	Cancelled	Cancelled	Cancelled
Angry Birds Star Wars II (Removed from store)	Rovio Entertainment	Rovio Entertainment	Cancelled	Cancelled	Cancelled
Angry Birds Stella (Removed from store)	Rovio Entertainment	Rovio Entertainment	Cancelled	Cancelled	Cancelled
Asphalt 5 (Removed from store)	Gameloft	Microsoft Studios	Cancelled	Cancelled	Cancelled
Asphalt 7: Heat (Removed from store)	Gameloft	Microsoft Studios	Cancelled	Cancelled	Cancelled
Asphalt 8: Airborne	Gameloft	Gameloft	Yes	Yes	Yes
Asphalt Overdrive (Removed from store)	Gameloft	Gameloft	Cancelled	Cancelled	Cancelled
Assassin's Creed Pirates (Removed from store)	Ubisoft Paris	Ubisoft	Cancelled	Cancelled	Cancelled
Assassin’s Creed – Altair’s Chronicles HD (Removed from store)	Gameloft	Gameloft	Cancelled	Cancelled	Cancelled
Avatar Gadgets	Microsoft Studios	Microsoft Studios	Yes	Yes	Yes
Babel Rising 3D (Removed from store)	Mando Productions	Ubisoft	Cancelled	Cancelled	Cancelled
Bad Piggies (Removed from store)	Rovio Entertainment	Rovio Entertainment	Cancelled	Cancelled	Cancelled
Battleship (Removed from store)	Electronic Arts	Microsoft Studios	Cancelled	Cancelled	Cancelled
Battlewagon	Ironsun Studios	Ironsun Studios	Yes	Yes	Yes
Beards & Beaks (Removed from store)	Microsoft Studios	Microsoft Studios	Cancelled	Cancelled	Cancelled
Bejeweled Live (Removed from store)	PopCap	PopCap Games	Cancelled	Cancelled	Cancelled
Bejeweled Live + (Removed from store)	PopCap	Electronic Arts	Cancelled	Cancelled	Cancelled
Big Buck Hunter Pro	Merge Interactive	Microsoft Studios	Yes	Yes	Yes
Blobster (Removed from store)	Divine Robot	Chillingo	Cancelled	Cancelled	Cancelled
Brain Challenge HD	Gameloft	Gameloft	Yes	Yes	Yes
Breeze	Null City Software	Microsoft Studios	Yes	Yes	Yes
Brick Breaker Revolution 3D (Removed from Store)	Digital Chocolate	Digital Chocolate	Cancelled	Cancelled	Cancelled
Briquid Mini	Gamious	Game Troopers	Yes	Yes	Yes
Bubble Guriko	Pupgam Studios	Game Troopers	Yes	Yes	Yes
Bubble Town 2	i-Play	i-Play	Yes	Yes	Yes
Bug Village (Removed from store)	Glu Mobile	Microsoft Studios	Cancelled	Cancelled	Cancelled
Bullet Asylum	Ubergeek Games	Microsoft Studios	Yes	Yes	Yes
Burn It All!	Pastagames and BulkyPix	Microsoft Studios	Yes	Yes	Yes
Burn the Rope	Big Blue Bubble	Microsoft Studios	Yes	Yes	Yes
Butterfly (Removed from Store)	Press Start Studio	Microsoft Studios	Cancelled	Cancelled	Cancelled
Carcassonne (Removed from Store)	Exozet Games	Microsoft Studios	Cancelled	Cancelled	Cancelled
CarneyVale Showtime	GAMBIT Game Lab	Microsoft Studios	Yes	Yes	Yes
Castlevania Puzzle: Encore of the Night (Removed from Store)	Konami Digital Entertainment	Konami Digital Entertainment	Cancelled	Cancelled	Cancelled
Chaos Rings (Removed from Store)	Media.Vision	Square Enix	Cancelled	Cancelled	Cancelled
Chickens Can't Fly (Removed from Store)	Amused Sloth	Microsoft Studios	Cancelled	Cancelled	Cancelled
Civilization Revolution	2K	2K	Yes	Yes	Yes
Collapse!	GameHouse Live	Microsoft Studios	Yes	Yes	Yes
Connect 4 (Removed from Store)	Mnemonic Studios	Electronic Arts	Cancelled	Cancelled	Cancelled
Contract Killer (Removed from Store)	Glu Mobile	Microsoft Studios	Cancelled	Cancelled	Cancelled
Contre Jour (Removed from Store)	Mokus Games	Chillingo	Cancelled	Cancelled	Cancelled
Crackdown 2: Project Sunburst (Removed from Store)	Seed	Microsoft Studios	Cancelled	Cancelled	Cancelled
Cracking Sands	Polarbit	Microsoft Studios	Yes	Yes	Yes
Crimson Dragon: Side Story	Grounding Inc.	Microsoft Studios	Yes	Yes	Yes
Cro-Mag Rally	citizen12 Studio	Microsoft Studios	Yes	Yes	Yes
Cut the Rope	ZeptoLab	ZeptoLab	Yes	Yes	Yes
Cut the Rope: Experiments	ZeptoLab	ZeptoLab	Yes	Yes	Yes
Da Vinci Pinball Machine (Removed from store)	Gameprom	Chillingo	Cancelled	Cancelled	Cancelled
de Blob (Removed from store)	THQ	THQ Inc	Cancelled	Cancelled	Cancelled
Decimation X2 (launch title)	Xona Games	Xona Games	Yes	Yes	Yes
Deer Hunter 3D (Removed from store)	Glu Mobile	Glu Mobile	Cancelled	Cancelled	Cancelled
Despicable Me: Minion Rush	Gameloft	Gameloft	Yes	Yes	Yes
DoDonPachi Maximum (Removed from store)	EVAC Industry	CAVE Interactive	Cancelled	Cancelled	Cancelled
Doodle God	JoyBits	Microsoft Studios	Yes	Yes	Yes
Doodle God Blitz	JoyBits	JoyBits	Yes	Yes	Yes
Doodle Jump	Lima Sky	Gamehouse Live	Yes	Yes	Yes
Dragon Mania Legends	Gameloft	Gameloft	Yes	Yes	Yes
Dream Track Nation (Removed from store)	Pow Pow Games	Chillingo	Cancelled	Cancelled	Cancelled
Droplitz Delight	Blitz Games	Gamehouse Live	Yes	Yes	Yes
Dungeon Hunter 4	Gameloft	Gameloft	Yes	Yes	Yes
Dungeon Hunter 5	Gameloft	Gameloft	Yes	Yes	Yes
Earthworm Jim HD (Removed from store)	Gameloft	Gameloft	Cancelled	Cancelled	Cancelled
Elements: Epic Heroes	Zadzen Games	Game Troopers	Yes	Yes	Yes
Enigmo (Removed from store)	Chaotic Moon Studios	Microsoft Studios	Cancelled	Cancelled	Cancelled
Equalicious	Dark Curry	Game Troopers	Yes	Yes	Yes
Extraction: Project Outbreak (Removed from store)	ShortRound Games	Chillingo	Cancelled	Cancelled	Cancelled
ExZeus 2	HyperDevBox	HyperDevBox	Yes	Yes	Yes
Fable: Coin Golf	Ideaworks Game Studio	Microsoft Studios	Yes	Yes	Yes
Farm Frenzy 2	Alawar Games	Microsoft Studios	Yes	Yes	Yes
Fast and the Furious: Adrenaline (Removed from Store)	i-Play	i-Play	Cancelled	Cancelled	Cancelled
Feed Me Oil (Removed from Store)	Holy Water Games	Chillingo	Cancelled	Cancelled	Cancelled
FIFA 13 (Removed from Store)	EA Romania	Electronic Arts	Cancelled	Cancelled	Cancelled
FIFA 14 (Removed from Store)	EA Romania	Electronic Arts	Cancelled	Cancelled	Cancelled
FIFA 15 Ultimate Team (Removed from Store)	EA Romania	Electronic Arts	Cancelled	Cancelled	Cancelled
Fight Game: Rivals	Khaeon Studios	Microsoft Studios	Yes	Yes	Yes
Final Fantasy	Square Enix	Square Enix	Yes	Yes	Yes
Final Fantasy III	Matrix Software	Square Enix	Yes	Yes	Yes
Flight Control (Removed from Store)	Firemint	Namco Bandai Games	Cancelled	Cancelled	Cancelled
Flight Control Rocket (Removed from Store)	Firemint	Electronic Arts	Cancelled	Cancelled	Cancelled
Fling (Removed from Store)	Miniclip	Miniclip	Cancelled	Cancelled	Cancelled
Flowerz	Carbonated Games	Microsoft Studios	Yes	Yes	Yes
Fragger	Miniclip	Miniclip	Yes	Yes	Yes
Free Slots Fun Factory (Removed from Store)	Rocks Pro	Game Troopers	Cancelled	Cancelled	Cancelled
Frogger (Removed from Store)	Konami Digital Entertainment	Konami Digital Entertainment	Cancelled	Cancelled	Cancelled
Fruit Ninja	Halfbrick Studios	Microsoft Studios	Yes	Yes	Yes
Full House Poker	Krome Studios	Microsoft Studios	Yes	Yes	Yes
Fusion Dots (Removed from Store)	BumBliss	Game Troopers	Cancelled	Cancelled	Cancelled
Fusion: Sentient	NinjaBee	Microsoft Studios	Yes	Yes	Yes
Galactic Reign	Slant Six Games	Microsoft Studios	Yes	Yes	Yes
Galaga Legions DX (Removed from Store)	Namco Bandai Games	Namco Bandai Games	Cancelled	Cancelled	Cancelled
Game Chest: Logic Games	Bonfire Studios	Microsoft Studios	Yes	Yes	Yes
Game Chest: Solitare	Bonfire Studios	Microsoft Studios	Yes	Yes	Yes
Game Room - Asteroids Deluxe	Krome Studios	Microsoft Studios	Yes	Yes	Yes
Game Room - Centipede	Krome Studios	Microsoft Studios	Yes	Yes	Yes
Game Room - Luna Lander	Krome Studios	Microsoft Studios	Yes	Yes	Yes
Game Room - Pitfall!	Krome Studios	Microsoft Studios	Yes	Yes	Yes
geoDefense	Critical Thought Games	Microsoft Studios	Yes	Yes	Yes
geoDefense Swarm	Critical Thought Games	Microsoft Studios	Yes	Yes	Yes
Gerbil Physics	Pencel Games	Microsoft Studios	Yes	Yes	Yes
Ghostscape	Psionic Games	Microsoft Studios	Yes	Yes	Yes
Glow Artisan (Removed from Store)	Powerhead Games	Microsoft Studios	Cancelled	Cancelled	Cancelled
Glyder: Adventure Worlds	Glu Mobile	Glu Mobile	Yes	Yes	Yes
Gravity Guy	Miniclip	Miniclip	Yes	Yes	Yes
Gravity Guy 2	Miniclip	Miniclip	Yes	Yes	Yes
Guitar Hero 5 (Removed from Store)	Glu Mobile	Glu	Cancelled	Cancelled	Cancelled
Gun Bros (Removed from Store)	Glu Mobile	Glu	Cancelled	Cancelled	Cancelled
Halo: Spartan Assault	Vanguard Games	Microsoft Studios	Yes	Yes	Yes
Halo: Spartan Strike	Vanguard Games	Microsoft Studios	Yes	Yes	Yes
Halo Waypoint	343 Industries	Microsoft Studios	Yes	Yes	Yes
Hamster Universe	SneakyBox Studios	Game Troopers	Yes	Yes	Yes
Harbor Master	Imangi Studios	Microsoft Studios	Yes	Yes	Yes
Hasta La Muerte	Pohlm Studios	Microsoft Studios	Yes	Yes	Yes
Hexic (Removed from Store)	Other Ocean Interactive	Microsoft Studios	Cancelled	Cancelled	Cancelled
Hexic Rush	Carbonated Games	Carbonated Games	Yes	Yes	Yes
Hitman GO	Square Enix Montreal	Square Enix	Yes	Yes	Yes
Hungry Shark Evolution	Future Games of London	Ubisoft	Yes	Yes	Yes
Hydro Thunder GO	Pixelbite Games	Microsoft Studios	Yes	Yes	Yes
I Dig It	InMotion Software	Microsoft Studios	Yes	Yes	Yes
I Love Katamari (Removed from Store)	Namco Bandai	Namco Bandai Games	Cancelled	Cancelled	Cancelled
iBlast Moki	Godzilab	Microsoft Studios	Yes	Yes	Yes
iBomber Defense (Removed from Store)	Cobra	Chillingo	Cancelled	Cancelled	Cancelled
Ice Age Village (Removed from Store)	Gameloft	Gameloft	Cancelled	Cancelled	Cancelled
ilomilo	SouthEnd Interactive	Microsoft Studios	Yes	Yes	Yes
Imperia Online	Imperia Online	Game Troopers	Yes	Yes	Yes
Implode!	IUGO Mobile	Microsoft Studios	Yes	Yes	Yes
iO The Game	Gamious	Game Troopers	Yes	Yes	Yes
IonBallEx	IronSun Studios	Microsoft Studios	Yes	Yes	Yes
iStunt 2	Miniclip	Miniclip	Yes	Yes	Yes
James Patterson’s Women’s Murder Club	Vivid Games	i-Play	Yes	Yes	Yes
Jet Car Stunts	True Axis	Microsoft Studios	Yes	Yes	Yes
Jet Set Go (Removed from Store)	Ph03nix New Media	Chillingo	Cancelled	Cancelled	Cancelled
Jetpack Joyride	Halfbrick Studios	Halfbrick Studios	Yes	Yes	Yes
KenKen (Removed from Store)	Capcom	Capcom	Cancelled	Cancelled	Cancelled
Kinectimals	Frontier Developments Ltd.	Microsoft Studios	Yes	Yes	Yes
Kinectimals Unleashed (Removed from Store)	Frontier Developments Ltd.	Microsoft Studios	Cancelled	Cancelled	Cancelled
Kingdoms & Lords	Gameloft	Gameloft	Yes	Yes	Yes
KooZac	SPL	Square Enix	Yes	Yes	Yes
Lara Croft: Relic Run	Simutronics	Square Enix	Yes	Yes	Yes
Let's Golf 2 (Removed from Store)	Gameloft	Gameloft	Cancelled	Cancelled	Cancelled
Lines The Game	Gamious	Game Troopers	Yes	Yes	Yes
Little Acorns (Removed from Store)	Chillingo/Team Pesky	Electronic Arts	Cancelled	Cancelled	Cancelled
Lode Runner Classic	Studio Voltz	Microsoft Studios	Yes	Yes	Yes
Make it Rain: The Love of Money	Space Inch	Game Troopers	Yes	Yes	Yes
Mass Effect: Infiltrator (Removed from Store)	IronMonkey Studios	Electronic Arts	Cancelled	Cancelled	Cancelled
Max & the Magic Marker	Press Play	Microsoft Studios	Yes	Yes	Yes
Microsoft Bingo	Frima Studios	Microsoft Studios	Yes	Yes	Yes
Microsoft Mahjong	Arkadium	Microsoft Studios	Yes	Yes	Yes
Microsoft Minesweeper	Arkadium	Microsoft Studios	Yes	Yes	Yes
Microsoft Solitaire Collection	Arkadium	Microsoft Studios	Yes	Yes	Yes
Minecraft	Mojang	Microsoft Studios	Yes	Yes	Yes
Minesweeper	Babaroga	Microsoft Studios	Yes	Yes	Yes
MiniSquadron (Removed from store)	Supermono Studios	Microsoft Studios	Cancelled	Cancelled	Cancelled
Mirror's Edge (Removed from store)	IronMonkey Studios	Electronic Arts	Cancelled	Cancelled	Cancelled
Modern Combat 4	Gameloft	Gameloft	Yes	Yes	Yes
Modern Combat 5: Blackout	Gameloft	Gameloft	Yes	Yes	Yes
Monopoly (Removed from store)	EA Redwood Shores	Electronic Arts	Cancelled	Cancelled	Cancelled
Monopoly Millionaire (Removed from store)	Electronic Arts	Electronic Arts	Cancelled	Cancelled	Cancelled
MonstaFish	Ironsun Studios	Ironsun Studios	Yes	Yes	Yes
Monster Burner (Removed from store)	Ubisoft Montreal	Ubisoft	Cancelled	Cancelled	Cancelled
Monster Go!	ThinkBox Studios	Game Troopers	Yes	Yes	Yes
Monster Island	Miniclip	Miniclip	Yes	Yes	Yes
More Brain Exercise (Removed from store)	Namco Bandai	Namco Bandai Games	Cancelled	Cancelled	Cancelled
Ms. Splosion Man	Twisted Pixel Games	Microsoft Studios	Yes	Yes	Yes
Mush	Angry Mango Games	Microsoft Studios	Yes	Yes	Yes
N.O.V.A. 3	Gameloft	Gameloft	Yes	Yes	Yes
NBA JAM (Removed from store)	EA Mobile	Electronic Arts	Cancelled	Cancelled	Cancelled
Need for Speed: Hot Pursuit (Removed from store)	EA Mobile	Electronic Arts	Cancelled	Cancelled	Cancelled
Need For Speed Undercover (Removed from store)	EA Mobile	Electronic Arts	Cancelled	Cancelled	Cancelled
OMG: Our Manic Game	Arkedo	Microsoft Studios	Yes	Yes	Yes
Orbital	Bitforge	Microsoft Studios	Yes	Yes	Yes
Order & Chaos Online	Gameloft	Gameloft	Yes	Yes	Yes
Overkill 3	Craneballs	Game Troopers	Yes	Yes	Yes
PAC-MAN (Removed from store)	Namco Bandai	Namco Bandai Games	Cancelled	Cancelled	Cancelled
Pac-Man Championship Edition DX (Removed from store)	Namco Bandai	Namco Bandai Games	Cancelled	Cancelled	Cancelled
Pac-Man Kart Rally (Removed from store)	Namco Bandai	Namco Bandai Games	Cancelled	Cancelled	Cancelled
Panzer Geekz	PortaPlay	Game Troopers	Yes	Yes	Yes
Parachute Panic	FDG Entertainment	Microsoft Studios	Yes	Yes	Yes
Parking Mania (Removed from store)	Mobirate	Chillingo	Cancelled	Cancelled	Cancelled
Picnic Wars (Removed from store)	Crown Adam AG	Chillingo	Cancelled	Cancelled	Cancelled
PES 2011 (Removed from Store)	Playsoft	Konami Digital Entertainment	Cancelled	Cancelled	Cancelled
PES 2012 (Removed from Store)	Playsoft	Konami Digital Entertainment	Cancelled	Cancelled	Cancelled
Plants vs. Zombies (Removed from Store)	PopCap	PopCap Games	Cancelled	Cancelled	Cancelled
Pocket God (Removed from Store)	Bolt Creative	ngmoco	Cancelled	Cancelled	Cancelled
Pool Pro Online 3 (Removed from Store)	Namco Bandai Games	Namco Bandai Games	Cancelled	Cancelled	Cancelled
Puzzle Quest 2 (Removed from Store)	Namco Bandai	Namco Bandai Games	Cancelled	Cancelled	Cancelled
Rabbids Big Bang	Ubisoft Paris	Ubisoft	Yes	Yes	Yes
Rabbids Go Phone (Removed from Store)	Ubisoft Paris	Ubisoft	Cancelled	Cancelled	Cancelled
Rayman Fiesta Run	Ubisoft Casablanca	Ubisoft	Yes	Yes	Yes
Rayman Jungle Run	Pasta Games	Ubisoft	Yes	Yes	Yes
Real Racing 2 (Removed from Store)	Firemint	Electronic Arts	Cancelled	Cancelled	Cancelled
Real Soccer (Removed from Store)	Gameloft	Gameloft	Cancelled	Cancelled	Cancelled
Real Soccer 2013 (Removed from Store)	Gameloft	Gameloft	Cancelled	Cancelled	Cancelled
Revolution	Playful Art	Microsoft Studios	Yes	Yes	Yes
Ridiculous Marathon	Crema Games	Game Troopers	Yes	Yes	Yes
Rise of Glory	Revo Solutions	Microsoft Studios	Yes	Yes	Yes
RISK (Removed from Store)	EA Mobile	Electronic Arts	Cancelled	Cancelled	Cancelled
Rocket Riot (Removed from Store)	Codeglue	Microsoft Studios	Cancelled	Cancelled	Cancelled
Roll in the Hole (Removed from Store)	Eccentricity Games	Chillingo	Cancelled	Cancelled	Cancelled
Runemals	JanduSoft	Game Troopers	Yes	Yes	Yes
Sally's Salon: Luxury Edition	GameHouse Live	GameHouse Live	Yes	Yes	Yes
Sally's Spa	GameHouse Live	GameHouse Live	Yes	Yes	Yes
Secrets and Treasure: The Lost Cities (Removed from Store)	Mediatonic	Microsoft Studios	Cancelled	Cancelled	Cancelled
Shark Dash (Removed from Store)	Gameloft	Gameloft	Cancelled	Cancelled	Cancelled
Shoot 1UP	Mommy's Best Games	Microsoft Studios	Yes	Yes	Yes
Shuffle Party	Babaroga	Microsoft Studios	Yes	Yes	Yes
Sid Meier's Civilization Revolution	Firaxis	2K Games	Yes	Yes	Yes
Sid Meier's Pirates!	2K	2K Games	Yes	Yes	Yes
Six-Guns (Removed from Store)	Gameloft	Gameloft	Cancelled	Cancelled	Cancelled
Skulls of the Shogun	17-BIT	Microsoft Studios	Yes	Yes	Yes
Sonic CD	Christian Whitehead	Sega	Yes	Yes	Yes
Sonic the Hedgehog 4: Episode I	Sonic Team	Sega	Yes	Yes	Yes
Spider Jack (Removed from store)	maxnick	Chillingo	Cancelled	Cancelled	Cancelled
Spy Mouse (Removed from store)	Firemint	EA Mobile	Cancelled	Cancelled	Cancelled
Star Wars: Battle for Hoth (Removed from store)	Fluffy Logic	THQ	Cancelled	Cancelled	Cancelled
Star Wars: Cantina (Removed from store)	THQ Wireless	THQ	Cancelled	Cancelled	Cancelled
Storm in a Teacup (Removed from store)	Cobra	Chillingo	Cancelled	Cancelled	Cancelled
Sudoku	Babaroga	Microsoft Studios	Yes	Yes	Yes
Super Monkey Ball	Other Ocean Interactive	Sega	Yes	Yes	Yes
Super Monkey Ball 2: Sakura Edition	Other Ocean Interactive	Sega Networks, Inc.	Yes	Yes	Yes
Temple Run 2	Imangi Studios	Imangi Studios	Yes	Yes	Yes
Tentacles (Removed from store)	Press Play	Microsoft Studios	Cancelled	Cancelled	Cancelled
Tentacles: Enter the Mind	Press Play	Microsoft Studios	Yes	Yes	Yes
Terraria	Codeglue	505 Games	Yes	Yes	Yes
Tetris (Removed from store)	EA Mobile	Electronic Arts	Cancelled	Cancelled	Cancelled
Tetris Blitz (Removed from store)	EA Mobile	Electronic Arts	Cancelled	Cancelled	Cancelled
TextTwist 2	GameHouse Live	Microsoft Studios	Yes	Yes	Yes
The Amazing Spider-Man	Gameloft	Gameloft	Yes	Yes	Yes
The Dark Knight Rises (Removed from store)	Gameloft	Gameloft	Cancelled	Cancelled	Cancelled
The Game of Life (Removed from store)	Ideaworks Game Studio	Electronic Arts	Cancelled	Cancelled	Cancelled
The Great Wobo Escape	Gamifi.cc Games	Game Troopers	Yes	Yes	Yes
The Harvest (Removed from store)	Luma Arcade	Microsoft Studios	Cancelled	Cancelled	Cancelled
The Oregon Trail	Gameloft	Gameloft	Yes	Yes	Yes
The Revenants: Corridor of Souls (Removed from store)	Chaotic Moon Studios	Microsoft Studios	Cancelled	Cancelled	Cancelled
The Sims 3 (Removed from store)	EA Mobile	Electronic Arts	Cancelled	Cancelled	Cancelled
The Sims FreePlay (Removed from store)	FireMonkeys	Electronic Arts	Cancelled	Cancelled	Cancelled
The Sims Medieval (Removed from store)	EA India	Electronic Arts	Cancelled	Cancelled	Cancelled
Throne Together	Rogue Rocket Games	Microsoft Studios	Yes	Yes	Yes
Tiger Woods PGA Tour 12 (Removed from store)	EA Mobile	Electronic Arts	Cancelled	Cancelled	Cancelled
Tika Taka Soccer	Panic Barn	Game Troopers	Yes	Yes	Yes
Tiki Towers	Mr.Goodliving	GameHouse Live	Yes	Yes	Yes
Tiny Plane (Removed from store)	Pow Pow Games	Chillingo	Cancelled	Cancelled	Cancelled
Tiny Troopers	Kukouri Mobile Entertainment	Game Troopers	Yes	Yes	Yes
Tiny Troopers 2: Special Ops	Kukouri Mobile Entertainment	Game Troopers	Yes	Yes	Yes
Tom Clancy's Splinter Cell Conviction (Removed from store)	Gameloft	Gameloft	Cancelled	Cancelled	Cancelled
Total Conquest	Gameloft	Gameloft	Yes	Yes	Yes
Touchdown Hero: New Season	Cherrypick Games	Game Troopers	Yes	Yes	Yes
Tower Bloxx: New York (Removed from store)	Digital Chocolate	Digital Chocolate	Cancelled	Cancelled	Cancelled
Toy Soldiers: Boot Camp	Signal Studios	Microsoft Studios	Yes	Yes	Yes
Trivial Pursuit (Removed from store)	EA Mobile	Electronic Arts	Cancelled	Cancelled	Cancelled
Trucking 3D	EVLPPY	Game Troopers	Yes	Yes	Yes
Turn N Run (Removed from store)	MaxNick	Electronic Arts	Cancelled	Cancelled	Cancelled
Twin Blades (Removed from store)	Press Start Studio	Microsoft Studios	Cancelled	Cancelled	Cancelled
Twins	Parrot Games	Game Troopers	Yes	Yes	Yes
UNO & Friends	Gameloft	Gameloft	Yes	Yes	Yes
UNO HD (Removed from store)	Gameloft	Gameloft	Cancelled	Cancelled	Cancelled
Vampire Rush (Removed from store)	A-Steroids	Chillingo	Cancelled	Cancelled	Cancelled
What in the World?	Plunge Interactive	Game Troopers	Yes	Yes	Yes
Who Wants To Be A Millionaire? (Removed from store)	Glu Mobile	Glu Mobile	Cancelled	Cancelled	Cancelled
Wordament	You vs. the Internet	Microsoft Studios	Yes	Yes	Yes
Wordament Snap Attack (Removed from store)	You vs. the Internet	Microsoft Studios	Cancelled	Cancelled	Cancelled
World At Arms	Gameloft	Gameloft	Yes	Yes	Yes
Xbox LIVE Extras	Microsoft Studios	Microsoft Studios	Yes	Yes	Yes
Xbox SmartGlass (Formally Xbox Companion)	Microsoft Studios	Microsoft Studios	Yes	Yes	Yes
Yahtzee (Removed from store)	EA Mobile	Electronic Arts	Cancelled	Cancelled	Cancelled
Z0MB1ES (on teh ph0ne)	Ska Studios	Microsoft Studios	Yes	Yes	Yes
Zombie Attack! 2	IUGO Mobile	IUGO Mobile	Yes	Yes	Yes
Zombies!!! (Removed from store)	Babaroga	Microsoft Studios	Cancelled	Cancelled	Cancelled
Zoo Tycoon Friends (Removed from store)	Behavior Interactive	Microsoft Studios	Cancelled	Cancelled	Cancelled
Zuma's Revenge (Removed from store)	PopCap Games	Electronic Arts	Cancelled	Cancelled	Cancelled

== See also ==
- Xbox Games Store
- Xbox Live Arcade
- List of Xbox 360 games
- List of Xbox Live Arcade games
- List of PlayStation minis games
- List of Downloadable PlayStation Portable games
