= Puss in Boots (video game) =

2011 video game

- North American Xbox 360 box art
- Developers: Blitz Games (consoles); ImaginEngine (DS)
- Publisher: THQ
- Directors: Mark Hardisty (consoles)
- Producers: Team Nacho (consoles)
- Designers: Lance Winter (consoles)
- Programmers: Steve Bond (consoles)
- Artists: Scott Davidson; Simon Ible; Nicholas Miles; Duncan Nimmo (consoles)
- Writers: James Parker (consoles)
- Composers: Matt Black (consoles)
- Engine: BlitzTech (consoles)
- Platforms: Xbox 360, PlayStation 3, Wii, Nintendo DS
- Release: NA: October 25, 2011; FRA: November 25, 2011 (X360); AU: December 1, 2011; EU: December 2, 2011
- Genre: Action game
- Modes: Single-player, multiplayer

Puss in Boots is a 2011 action game based on the film of the same name. It was developed by Blitz Games Studios and released by THQ for Xbox 360, PlayStation 3, Wii and Nintendo DS. It features support for Kinect and PlayStation Move on the respective platforms.

== Gameplay ==
Gameplay screenshot

The console versions of the game provide players an opportunity to engage in frantic swordplay action as Puss, utilizing motion controls, mandatory for the Wii and Xbox 360 versions and optional for the PS3 version, for attack actions. The non-Nintendo versions also support multiplayer. The Nintendo DS version, which is a rhythm-action game, also requires motion controls via stylus and touch screen.

== Synopsis ==
In the years before meeting Shrek and Donkey in Shrek 2, Puss in Boots must clear his name from all charges against him that has made him a wanted fugitive. While Puss is trying to steal magic beans from the infamous criminals Jack and Jill, the hero crosses paths with his female counterpart, Kitty Softpaws, who leads him to his old friend turned enemy, Humpty Dumpty. Memories of friendship and betrayal enlarges Puss' doubt, but he eventually agrees to help the egg get the magic beans. Together, the three of them plan to steal the magic beans, travel to the Giant's castle, steal the golden goose, and clear Puss' name.

== Spin-off mobile game ==
A mobile spin-off, Fruit Ninja: Puss in Boots, was released on October 20, 2011, on the iOS App Store, and was released for Android devices on November 28, 2011, on the Amazon Appstore, as part of Halfbrick Studios' Fruit Ninja series and game franchise.

== Reception ==
Reception

Aggregate score
Aggregator	Score			
Aggregator	DS	PS3	Wii	Xbox 360
Metacritic	42/100	70/100	60/100	86/100

Review scores
Publication	Score			
Publication	DS	PS3	Wii	Xbox 360
Jeuxvideo.com	2/20	10/20	10/20	10/20
NGamer	35%	N/A	N/A	N/A
PlayStation Official Magazine – UK	N/A	6/10	N/A	N/A
Official Xbox Magazine (US)	N/A	N/A	N/A	8/10
Common Sense Media	N/A	N/A	N/A	4/5

The Xbox 360 version received "favorable" reviews, and the PlayStation 3 and Wii versions received "mixed or average reviews", while the DS version received "unfavorable" reviews, according to the review aggregation website Metacritic.

Official Xbox Magazine said that the former console version "constantly surprises with a steady amount of variety and silly fun" and had "responsive controls and some inventive gameplay for Kinect users".
