= Triple Match 3D =

2022 video game

- Developer: BoomBox Games
- Publisher: BoomBox Games
- Platforms: iOS, iPadOS,Android, Amazon Fire Tablet
- Release: 13 April 2022
- Genre: Puzzle game
- Mode: Single-player

Triple Match 3D is a free-to-play 3D matching puzzle game developed by BoomBox Games, a subsidiary of Miniclip. In the game players find and match three identical 3D objects from a pile to clear them from the board.

It was released on 13 April 2022.

== Gameplay ==
The core objective of Triple Match 3D is to clear a game board by matching three identical 3D objects. Players are presented with a pile of various everyday items and must tap on three of the same item to form a triple and remove them. Each level has a specific set of target items to clear within a time limit. As players progress, some items are hidden beneath the pile and become accessible only after other objects are cleared. A collection bar tracks the unmatched items; if it fills up before a triple can be formed, the player fails the level.

To assist with the gameplay, a variety of boosters are available, which can be acquired through in-app purchases or by clearing levels. These include pre-game boosters like Super Lightning and Extra Time, as well as in-level boosters such as Magnet, Undo, Fan, and Freeze Time. The game also supports offline play.

== Reception ==
Since its release on 13 April 2022 The game has been downloaded approximately twenty million times. Data from the mobile business intelligence firm Sensor Tower indicates the game was the tenth highest-grossing game globally in December 2023, and the second highest-grossing hybrid-casual game worldwide in 2023.

Video game reviewer Johnny Peterson, in a review for Gamezebo, stated that "Triple Match 3D is – in many ways – nothing you haven’t seen before." Ahmetcan Demirel of Gamigion remarked that the game "essentially proved that this puzzle mechanic wasn’t just an idle distraction. It could be the spine of a sustainable, IAP-driven economy" referring to the game's model. The game has been noted as an inspiration for other games in the genre, such as Match Factory.

The game has an average user score of 4.9 out of 5 on the Apple App Store and a 4.6 out of 5 on Google Play.

In April 2024, the developer partnered with the environmental rewards platform Dots.eco for an in-game tree-planting initiative to honor Earth Day. The campaign, which was repeated in May 2025, aimed to plant 20,000 trees in real life.
