= Fish Out of Water (video game) =

2013 video game

- Developer: Halfbrick Studios
- Publisher: Halfbrick Studios
- Platforms: iOS, Android
- Release: iOS: 10 April 2013; 26 June 2023 (Re-release); Android: 11 July 2014; July 2023 (Re-release)
- Genre: Action game
- Mode: Single-player

Fish Out of Water is a 2013 action game developed by Australian game developer Halfbrick Studios for iOS and Android.

== Gameplay ==
The player throws three fish (or rather fish and mammals) from a selection of 6 one at a time. Each fish has a unique optimal way to throw. After three fish are thrown, a panel of 5 crabs judge the player on a scale of 1 to 10. There is a boost bar which allows the player to increase the velocity of the fish being thrown and boosting units floating on the game field, named boosties in-game, that will be collected if a swimmer comes close to them. There are also achievements to be completed.

== Availability ==
The game was removed from the App Store and Google Play as of February 2020. According to Halfbrick, this was due to the game "not [meeting] the legal requirement of recent legislation changes," although they did not specify which changes they were referring to. It was revealed on 25 January 2023 that the game would become available to download again later that same year. As of July 2023, Fish Out of Water was made available again as part of a Halfbrick+ sign-up service.

== Reception ==
Reception

Aggregate score
Aggregator	Score
Metacritic	67/100

Review scores
Publication	Score
Destructoid	7/10
Game Informer	6/10
Gamezebo	3.5/5
IGN	6.9/10
MacLife	3/5
Pocket Gamer	3.5/5
TouchArcade	4/5
Digital Spy	3/5
National Post	6/10

The iOS version received "average" reviews according to the review aggregation website Metacritic. Gamezebo praised the "great presentation" and the quirky personality of the fish and judges, and stated that the iOS version is "easy to pick up" while criticizing the limited replay value and the missions/objectives getting repetitive after a while. IGN called the same iOS version as not having "that same finger-licking, addictive goodness found in Halfbrick's previous hits Jetpack Joyride or Fruit Ninja."

Common Sense Media gave the iOS version all five stars, saying, "With a very basic gameplay mechanism, it's a great example of something that's easy to learn but difficult to master." However, Digital Spy gave it three stars out of five, saying that it was "still a fun pick up and play game, but after five minutes you have essentially seen everything the game has to offer. Like the game's title, Halfbrick may have stepped out of its natural element with this game, and the result is gasping desperately for air." National Post gave it a similar score of six out of ten, saying, "Halfbrick has proven in the past that less can be more, but they seem to have forgotten that without careful planning and a brilliant idea it also risks being less."
