= Dan the Man =

2015 video game

- Developer: Halfbrick Studios
- Publisher: Halfbrick Studios
- Platforms: iOS; Android; tvOS; Windows
- Release: November 26, 2015 (Android); October 5, 2016 (iOS); 2015 (tvOS)
- Genres: Beat-'em up; platform
- Modes: Single-player, multiplayer

Dan the Man, commonly abbreviated as DTM, is a 2015 mobile platform beat-'em up video game developed and published by Halfbrick Studios in partnership with Studio JOHO. Based on a web series of the same name, it was released for the iOS and Android.

== Gameplay ==
A level with platforming and enemies.

Dan the Man is a 2D platformer beat-'em up game, where the players have to complete sets of levels in worlds. The player must traverse worlds with themes such as a grassy village, the sewers, but primarily of a kingdom. The player is shown a world map which lets them access levels and bonus levels. Normal levels have the player complete a series of platforming and combat challenges, where the game is interrupted by fight sequences in certain areas where the player is forced to defeat groups of enemies to continue. There are some secrets within levels which reward the player for finding them. There are shops scattered around levels where the player can purchase items to help them at any time using coins (the in-game currency).

Normal levels contain a boss fight if they are the last level of the world.

Bonus levels have the player fight groups of enemies with little platforming inside of an arena, where the player goes on to the next round of enemies. These levels usually have 3 rounds of enemy battles, where the player has intermissions in between in all of them to buy items and power-ups to aid in battle. If the player is defeated or runs out of time (which they can get from defeating enemies and destroying objects), they lose. If the player is defeated for the first time in any normal level, they can watch an advertisement to get a Revival Potion, which revives the player from the exact place they were defeated (the player won't have to watch an advertisement if they pay a micro transaction).

When completing the Main Story for the first time, the player unlocks Hard Mode, where enemies are much stronger, faster and have more health; the player also doesn't have their Revival Potion.

The player can find ranged weapons in levels, which can be upgraded to increase their damage and effectiveness in the character menu. As of version 1.1.6, weapons last only until the end of the level and no longer carry over to the next level.

When the player completes a level after the first world, the player has to wait for a certain number of time (examples include 6 hours, 12 hours, and 24 hours) before being able to play the next level (this can be bypassed with micro transactions or by watching an advertisement). Bonus levels are unlocked after beating certain levels and require no wait time to access.

There are two DLC worlds the player can buy, which are Frosty Plains and Fright Zone. Both come with more levels with more enemies and art.

=== Characters ===
The player may use one of four characters. Dan, Josie, Barry Steakfries (a character derived from Jetpack Joyride who has to be purchased with real money), and a custom character. Dan and Josie have no special attributes while Barry has a shotgun attack with lower damage output, and the custom character has passive boosts to their stats depending on the clothes they wear. The player's custom character can be given a piece of clothing by purchasing the clothing with coins or through some other means. Each character has their own upgrades, where the player can spend coins to make a specific character's ability stronger by increasing the damage, speed, add new attributes, etc.

=== Survival Mode ===
Survival Mode is a mode within the game that is very similar to the bonus levels - the player fights enemies in an arena with them being able to purchase items in between rounds. Survival mode works similarly, but it has the player fight an infinite number of rounds, and it only ends if the player is defeated, runs out of time, or quits. There is an Easy, Normal, and Hard mode selection which impact the speed in which enemies get stronger every round, which get unlocked upon reaching a survival milestone. During these battles, certain "special" enemies may appear, who when defeated, drop an amount of tokens depending on the difficulty, 1 in Easy, 2 in Normal, and 3 in Hard.

Tokens are used in the Prize Machine to get a random prize from it. Prizes may be power-ups the player can use for free without payment, costume tickets which when having all the tickets for a costume, the player unlocks said costume, coins, and more tokens.

=== Multiplayer Mode ===
Multiplayer Mode was introduced in October 2020.. The objective of Multiplayer Mode is to get more points than the other player in the same sets of battles. Players can also sabotage each other through various means, such as throwing an enemy towards them, which can knock them back. The player who gets the most points after a certain number of rounds wins. The player's points all build up to get prizes, the player gets a prize when they reach a total point milestone.

=== Adventure Mode ===
Adventure Mode (also referred to as "Weekly Events", or "Daily Challenge Mode") is also a mode within the game, where the player fights a series of levels within costume-themed adventures which can be bonus levels, normal levels, or boss fights. They also force the player to use a specific character, regardless if they have them or not (i.e, a level requiring the use of Barry, which lets the player use them, but only for the specific level). There are set requirements in each level, such as: completing the level within a time limit, defeating all enemies, or running past a finish line in the level. The player can access the next adventure if they complete all the levels in the current adventure regardless of the difficulty.

There are three difficulties of play for each level (easy, medium and hard), where if the player beats that level on that difficulty, they earn a trophy specific to that difficulty. The trophies are required to unlock prizes in the adventure. The player needs bronze trophies to obtain the bronze prize, silver trophies for the silver prize, and gold trophies for the gold prize. If the player collects all gold trophies, the player will obtain the "Frosty Plains" Story Mode DLC, for free.

== Story ==
=== Characters ===
- Dan — The main character, presumably a young adult or someone around that age. He lives in a small city and his morality is the main point of the game, as he must decide whether or not to side with the Ninjas or the King. He has extensive knowledge of martial arts and is courageous, though easily led in bad directions, as shown by him being easily manipulated by the ninjas. At the end of the game, he is killed by the Ninja King and is shown to actually lose lives upon dying (à la Scott Pilgrim). Upon dying, he goes back in time, and, knowing the ninjas are evil, defeats them before they can do lasting damage.
- Josie — Dan’s love interest and the main supporting character, who is playable from the beginning. She was captured by The Advisor to run on a treadmill alongside the villagers to generate power for the kingdom, but once she found a chance to escape, she quickly got out. It is implied that there was some event in the past that led to her assuming Dan was dead, so when they reunite, she assumes he is a supernatural being and runs away. At the end of the game, she is killed by the Ninja King. She has amazing physicality, as demonstrated by her ability to run on a treadmill for weeks on end.
- Geezers — Two old men who are followers of the ninjas. They believe the King is torturing the villagers because of his capitalist ways, but soon realize the ninjas are evil when they commit mass genocide, including the villagers they proclaimed to be rescuing. After leaving the ninjas, they join Dan on his quest to rescue Josie, and then go to the castle to rescue the King. Upon attempting to reason with the ninjas, one of the Geezers is shot to death by the Ninja King. The other one seeks revenge as well, but is also killed by the Ninja King (alongside Josie and the Advisor) by the Ninja King.
- The King — One of the main "villains". He is unknowingly lured into hatching "evil" plans by the Advisor, which leads to him being perceived as "evil" by the ninjas. Despite his guards attempting to kill Dan for most of the game, he acts in no antagonistic ways towards Dan. At the end of the game, the Ninja King kills him.
- Advisor — A major supporting villain. He is the king’s aging, mild-mannered assistant who is secretly plotting a smear campaign against him. Despite being supremely intelligent, he often hires other people to do his dirty work, such as the soldiers and, surprisingly, the villagers, who he forces to run on a treadmill to generate power. At the end of the game, he is killed by the Ninja King. Notably, he is the only antagonist besides the king to not have a boss fight.
- The Dark and Light Masters — 8-bit-stylized stick men with swords. The Dark Master is the secondary antagonist, and helps with the Advisor on his plan. The Light Master aids Dan in stopping the Dark Master by teaching Dan martial arts, and is the Dark Master's foil.
- Villagers — A group of civilians who live in a town. They are pacifists, and are rejected by Dan for violence instead initially, but then are shown to follow Dan as their leader after the game.
- Ninjas (Resistance) — A militia that are activists for violence against the King, so much so that they want the King dead. While claiming to fight for the common folk, they are morally ambiguous until they kill one of the Geezers, which leads to them being the secondary antagonists halfway through the game.

=== Plot ===
Dan is met with a group of ninjas and villagers, with ninjas being in favor for violence, and the villagers being in favor of peace. When asking Dan which side Dan will take, Dan decides to choose the option of going with violence alongside the ninjas, which leads to the first few levels of the game. Dan, the ninjas, and the two Geezers go on their journey to defeat and "stop" the King's rule while the ninjas help.

Meanwhile, the Advisor secretly hatches a plan that involves the villagers. He recruits the Dark Master to help him on the plan. The Dark Master drops powder on villagers, tranquilizing them, and holds them hostage. One of these people were Josie, she and everyone else who was captured are put on a treadmill inside of the sewers of the kingdom, with guards preventing anyone who tries to escape. Any captives who stopped running would fall into a pit of spikes behind the treadmill. The treadmill was a way to have the kingdom gain electricity.

Later on, Dan defeats three giant robots, the first being the one that terrorizes a village, the second guarding a castle, and the third being a crowd control vehicle. Dan then goes into the sewers of the kingdom. On the treadmill, Josie notices that the two guards above them left the vicinity, which let Josie run as hard as she can to reach the guard in front and knock him unconscious. Josie stops the treadmill, and the villagers congratulate her before the Geezers break up a hole in the wall, killing multiple villagers. Dan comes out of the hole in the wall, which leaves Josie panicking—Josie, having believed that Dan was dead, was in terror, and believed he was out to get her, and was a supernatural being of some sorts. She runs out of the sewers, and the Geezers chase after her. Dan, about to leave with the others, was stopped by the Dark Master, who forcefully challenges Dan to a fight. After a battle, the Dark Master interrupts Dan again, and begins to chase him before stopped by the Light Master, a white 8-bit stick man, and the Masters fight. Dan leaves while they fight, and goes to the kingdom's parts, near where The King lives.

Dan, the ninjas, and the two Geezers reach the King. The ninjas hold him at gunpoint, and then shoot him to death after noticing that Dan is there. The murder of the King was a shock to Dan and the Geezers. One of the Geezers attempt to stop the leader of the ninjas, but then gets shot to death by him, this triggers the other Geezer to seek for vengeance, and him, and Dan decide to stop the ninjas from killing everyone else.

When Dan reaches the top of the kingdom, he finds that there is a huge brawl occurring, with guns being shot and people collapsing onto the floor. Josie is fighting a guard and the Advisor, and once Dan reaches up to them, he finds nobody there and walks up stairs. One of the Geezers are being held by the Advisor, where he is threatening to kill the Geezer if Josie shoots him. Suddenly, the ninja leader shoots all three of them, and leaves Dan as the last one standing. He then goes into his giant robot to defeat Dan. After Dan defeats him, the ninja leader then reveals a push-button, and after pressing it, explodes everything. Dan is killed, and is now back where he had to choose between violence or peace. Dan immediately picks peace after everything that has happened.

== Reception ==
Dan the Man

Aggregate score
| Aggregator | Score |
|---|---|
| Metacritic | 86/100 |

Review scores
| Publication | Score |
|---|---|
| Gamezebo | 90% |
| Pocket Gamer | 80% |
| TouchArcade | 90% |

The reactions to the game are generally positive. Dan the Man has an aggregate score of 86 out of 100 on Metacritic.

TouchArcade calls the game "A blast while it lasts". The TouchArcade reviewer compares Dan the Man with other free mobile games such as Candy Crush Saga, praising Dan the Man for following the structure of "quality over quantity" with its long levels instead of having thousands of shorter levels like what Candy Crush provides. Though they admit that "the levels are perhaps a little too long for their own good at times". The reviewer also applauds how the game's difficulty is by writing, "It's able to roll out its roster of enemies at a steady pace, ramp up the difficulty curve smoothly, and finish before any of it gets old."

Multiplayer.it eulogizes the game by saying, "Dan the Man is a traditional action platformer, but terribly solid and fun". They commend the game for its controls quite a lot, writing, "The touch controls support this system very well [referring to the moves the player can perform], with two arrows (perhaps a little too small) on the left side of the screen."

Gamezebo's Nick Tylwalk is also very impressed with the game, praising the game for having "simple, yet effective controls", and "Excellent retro-tinged visuals", but also criticizes the game for not having the entire plot not being inside the actual game and being split-off into a web series.

Pocket Gamer also commends the game by saying, "This is one of those rare games that gets pretty much everything right, and you'd be doing yourself a disservice if you didn't have a crack at it", though the same reviewer admits that they thought it was a little formulaic.

SpazioGames states that the game "demonstrates how simplicity is sometimes the key to fun". The same SpazioGames reviewer also lightly criticizes the game for its linear level structure, but is fine with it due to the secrets each level contains.

3D Juegos praises the game for its tight and precise controls, and the diversity of the player's moves and attacks. Though they also mention that the game has a major flaw of having a very short story mode, which they state is somewhat saved by the inclusion of the game's survival mode, and the fact that the game is free-to-play. They conclude that it has a "very successful and suggestive level design', precise controls, "high quality details", it is free-to-play but fair in its micro transactions, but that it also has a short story mode and criticizes the music, stating that "its soundtrack is quite repetitive".

== Web series ==
The Dan the Man web series is a series on YouTube originally uploaded by Studio JOHO (the Halfbrick Studios YouTube account reuploaded episodes 1-7, and posted episodes 8-22 on their channel exclusively). On March 23, 2010, the first episode of the web series, Dan the Man was posted on YouTube. The series, much like the video game, follows Dan, as he tries to find love while defeating threats that come his way, and eventually tries to "overthrow" the King. The series originally only had 7 episodes when the video game was released.

After Stage 7's release, the web series went on hiatus for 44 months, and after that, Stage 8 was released (which had a very similar but different plot compared to the actual game), and the web series then had another hiatus which lasted 57 months. The hiatus ended with Stage 9, where the series began to roughly have a monthly release schedule, with the series concluding at Stage 17, before resuming with Stage 18 on September 13, 2024 after a 23 month hiatus; later Stages were released every Friday until Stage 22.

The series currently has 22 episodes.

| No. | Title | Original release date |
|---|---|---|
| 1 | "Stage 1" | November 23, 2010 |
| 2 | "Stage 2" | April 10, 2013 |
| 3 | "Stage 3" | April 16, 2013 |
| 4 | "Stage 4" | April 23, 2013 |
| 5 | "Stage 5" | April 30, 2013 |
| 6 | "Stage 6" | May 7, 2013 |
| 7 | "Stage 7" | May 14, 2013 |
| 8 | "Stage 8" | February 4, 2017 |
| 9 | "Stage 9" | November 26, 2021 |
| 10 | "Stage 10" | January 29, 2022 |
| 11 | "Stage 11" | February 26, 2022 |
| 12 | "Stage 12" | March 26, 2022 |
| 13 | "Stage 13" | April 30, 2022 |
| 14 | "Stage 14" | May 28, 2022 |
| 15 | "Stage 15" | July 23, 2022 |
| 16 | "Stage 16" | September 3, 2022 |
| 17 | "Stage 17" | October 1, 2022 |
| 18 | "Stage 18" | September 13, 2024 |
| 19 | "Stage 19" | September 20, 2024 |
| 20 | "Stage 20" | September 27, 2024 |
| 21 | "Stage 21" | October 4, 2024 |
| 22 | "Stage 22" | October 11, 2024 |

== Sequel ==
A new sequel titled Dan the Man 2 was announced in 2023.
