= Fish out of water =

Fish out of water is an idiom used to refer to a person who is in unfamiliar, and often uncomfortable, surroundings.

Fish out of water may also refer to:

== Film and television ==
- Fish Out of Water (1993 film), a Danish film
- Fish Out of Water (2009 film), a documentary
- Fish Out of Water (2023 film), an American short film
- "Fish Out of Water" (BoJack Horseman), a 2016 episode of BoJack Horseman
- "A Fish out of Water" (Family Guy), a 2001 episode of Family Guy
- Fish Out of Water, a character in the 2005 film Chicken Little
- "Fish Out of Water", a 2011 episode of Fish Hooks

== Music ==
- Fish Out of Water (Chris Squire album), 1975
- Fish Out of Water (Charles Lloyd album), 1990
- Fish Out of Water (Ash Grunwald album), 2008
- "Fish Out of Water", a song by Tears for Fears from Elemental, 1993
- "Fish Out of Water", a song by One Minute Silence from Buy Now... Saved Later, 2000
- "Fish Out of Water", a song by OPM on Menace to Sobriety, 2000
- "Fish Out of Water", a song by Nicola Roberts on Cinderella's Eyes, 2011
- "Fish Out of Water", a song by Mudvayne from The New Game, 2008

== Other uses ==
- A Fish Out of Water (book), a 1961 children's book by Helen Palmer Geisel
- Fish Out of Water (video game), released in 2013

== See also ==
- Fish Outta Water, 2009 debut album of Chali 2na
- A Fish in the Water, a memoir of Peruvian writer Mario Vargas Llosa, originally published as El pez en el agua in 1993
