= 8 Ball Pool =

2008 video game

- App icon
- Developer: Miniclip
- Publisher: Miniclip
- Platforms: Windows, Android, iOS
- Release: Windows; 2008; Android, iOS; 2013
- Genre: Sports
- Modes: Multiplayer; singleplayer

8 Ball Pool (stylized as 8POOL) is a 2008 sports game developed and published by the Swiss company Miniclip. The game was released for browsers in 2008 and for iOS and Android in 2013. 8 Ball Pool allows players to play pool against others online in a variety of modes, including 9-ball.

== Gameplay ==
8 Ball Pool is a two-dimensional pool simulator game, with two players facing each other in a number of online modes. Players gain experience and level-up the more they play, although this is not necessarily a measure of skill. Most modes follow the same rules as standard pool; players put balls of their suit (either solids or stripes) before potting the black 8-ball to win a game if holes are marked by a circular breaking-line. Potting the 8 ball before any of other balls will cause player to lose.

Some tiers have custom rules, including; a mode of playing without a guideline to direct shots, and a mode requiring players to choose a hole/pocket before making a move to pot a ball. Players play with 9 balls in 9 Ball mode.

Players can enter tournaments, with winner of multiple matches earning a larger award.

Along with the main pool modes, 8 Ball Pool also features minigames. These include scratch cards and a spinning wheel.

=== Currency ===
As a free to play game, 8 Ball Pool uses a form of currency to manage its in-game economy. With cash, players spend a certain amount of coins to play a game, with different tiers of competition available. Players are awarded a small amount of free coins regularly (e.g.: 30 coins to collect after one hour passes) to ensure a game can be played. Players earn more coins by winning.

Coins can also be used to get pool cues and avatar images.

Players can also get coins and unlock cues in Surprise boxes.

== Development and release ==
8 Ball Pool was originally developed with Adobe Flash, hosted by www.miniclip.com in 2008, and titled 8 Ball Quick Fire Pool. This initial version had no in-game transactions, different cues, or multiplayer. Multiplayer was added in October 2010. The first mobile version for iOS and Android was released in 2013 as a paid app with no in-game purchases. Later the same year, 8 Ball Pool switched to a free price point supported by in-game purchases, which saw a quick increase in popularity. The game quickly became a top-ranked game on iOS and Android in both downloads and in-game revenue.

In June 2017, a version of the game was released for Facebook Messenger and Apple iMessage.

== Reception ==
On Metacritic, the game has a "mixed or average" rating of 74 based on five critics.

Reception

Aggregate score
Aggregator	Score
Metacritic	74/100
