= Puss in Boots (2011 film) =

DreamWorks Animation film

- Theatrical release poster
- Directed by: Chris Miller
- Screenplay by: Tom Wheeler
- Story by: Brian Lynch; Will Davies; Tom Wheeler
- Based on: Shrek by: Ted Elliott; Terry Rossio; Joe Stillman; Roger S. H. Schulman; Puss in Boots by Charles Perrault
- Produced by: Joe M. Aguilar; Latifa Ouaou
- Starring: Antonio Banderas; Salma Hayek; Zach Galifianakis; Billy Bob Thornton; Amy Sedaris
- Edited by: Erika Dapkewicz (Note: Credited as Eric Dapkewicz; Dapkewicz came out as transgender and changed her name in the 2010s.)
- Music by: Henry Jackman
- Production company: DreamWorks Animation
- Distributed by: Paramount Pictures (Note: In July 2014, the film's distribution rights were purchased by DreamWorks Animation from Paramount Pictures and transferred to 20th Century Fox before reverting to Universal Pictures in 2018 following NBCUniversal's acquisition of DreamWorks Animation in 2016.)
- Release dates: October 16, 2011 (Allure of the Seas); October 28, 2011 (United States)
- Running time: 90 minutes
- Country: United States
- Language: English
- Budget: $130 million
- Box office: $555 million

Puss in Boots is a 2011 American animated adventure comedy film featuring the titular character originally from Shrek 2 (2004) and inspired by the fairy tale. Produced by DreamWorks Animation, the film was directed by Chris Miller and written by Tom Wheeler. Antonio Banderas stars as Puss in Boots, alongside Salma Hayek, Zach Galifianakis, Billy Bob Thornton, and Amy Sedaris. The film follows the origin story of Puss in Boots, before the events of Shrek 2.

Development began following the release of Shrek 2 in 2004. Originally titled Puss in Boots: The Story of an Ogre Killer, it was announced as a direct-to-video film, scheduled to be released in 2008. In October 2006, the film was redeveloped as a theatrical release, with Shrek the Third (2007) director Miller joining the project.

Puss in Boots had its world premiere on October 16, 2011, aboard the cruise ship Allure of the Seas, and was released in theaters in the United States on October 28 by Paramount Pictures. The film received generally positive reviews from critics and was a commercial success, grossing $555 million on a production budget of $130 million. At the 84th Academy Awards, the film was nominated for Best Animated Feature. A television series spin-off, The Adventures of Puss in Boots, premiered in January 2015, and a sequel, Puss in Boots: The Last Wish, was released in 2022.

== Plot ==
Puss in Boots is a Spanish-speaking anthropomorphic cat, named for his signature pair of boots. A fugitive on the run from the law, Puss is seeking to restore his lost honor. One night, he learns that the murderous outlaw couple Jack and Jill have the magic beans he has long sought, which can lead him to a giant's castle known by legend to contain valuable golden goose eggs.

When Puss attempts to steal the beans at their hideout, a female cat named Kitty Softpaws interrupts. She was hired to steal them as well by Humpty Alexander Dumpty, a talking egg and Puss' long-estranged childhood friend from the orphanage in San Ricardo, where they both were raised. Puss tells Kitty his origin story; he has been on the run from the law ever since Humpty tricked him into assisting in what turned out to be a failed bank robbery when they were teenagers. Humpty eventually persuades Puss to join them in finding the beans and retrieving the golden eggs.

Puss and Kitty's relationship turns romantic and, despite Puss's initial grudge against Humpty, he slowly warms to him. The trio steal the beans from Jack and Jill and plant them in the desert. They ride the beanstalk into the clouds and enter the giant's castle. There, Humpty reveals that the giant died a long time ago, and they manage to avoid the "Great Terror" who guards the Golden Goose and the golden eggs. They soon realize the eggs are too heavy, so they decide to steal the Golden Goose after witnessing it laying them. They manage to escape the castle and cut down the beanstalk. After celebrating, the group is ambushed by Jack and Jill, and Puss is knocked unconscious.

When he wakes, Puss assumes Humpty and Kitty were kidnapped and tracks Jack and Jill's wagon back to San Ricardo, where he learns that the kidnapping was staged. Jack, Jill, and Kitty are all working for Humpty, who is seeking revenge against him for abandoning him to be arrested. Puss is surrounded by the town's militia and turns himself in following pleas from his adoptive mother, Imelda. As he is hauled away to prison, Humpty is celebrated as a hero for bringing the wealth of golden eggs to the townspeople.

In prison, Puss meets Andy "Jack" Beanstalk, who reveals that Humpty stole the beans from him when they shared a cell years ago. Jack explains to Puss that the Great Terror is the Golden Goose's mother, a gigantic bird who will stop at nothing to rescue her baby. Puss realizes that luring the huge goose to destroy San Ricardo was Humpty's intention all along, as he held a grudge against the town for imprisoning him. Kitty frees Puss from prison and apologizes, revealing her feelings for him. He locates Humpty in time and convinces him to redeem himself by helping to save San Ricardo from destruction. Using the gosling as bait, Puss and Humpty are able to lure the Great Terror away from town; with Kitty's help, they also thwart Jack and Jill's attempts to steal the gosling during the chase. As the group reaches the outskirts of town, Humpty and the gosling are knocked off a collapsing bridge, but manage to hang onto a rope that Puss grabs. When it becomes evident that Puss cannot save them both, Humpty sacrifices himself by letting go. After a fatal impact, Puss discovers that Humpty has a large golden egg beneath his shell. The Great Terror is reunited with her gosling, and she takes Humpty's golden egg and returns to her home in the clouds.

Despite being hailed a hero by the townspeople for saving San Ricardo, Puss is still a fugitive in the eyes of the militia. He reunites with Imelda, who expresses her pride and love for Puss before he flees with Kitty, who playfully steals his boots. In the epilogue, Jack and Jill are recovering from their injuries, a restored Humpty is seen wearing a golden egg costume and dancing on the Great Terror's back with her gosling, and Puss and Kitty share a kiss.

== Voice cast ==
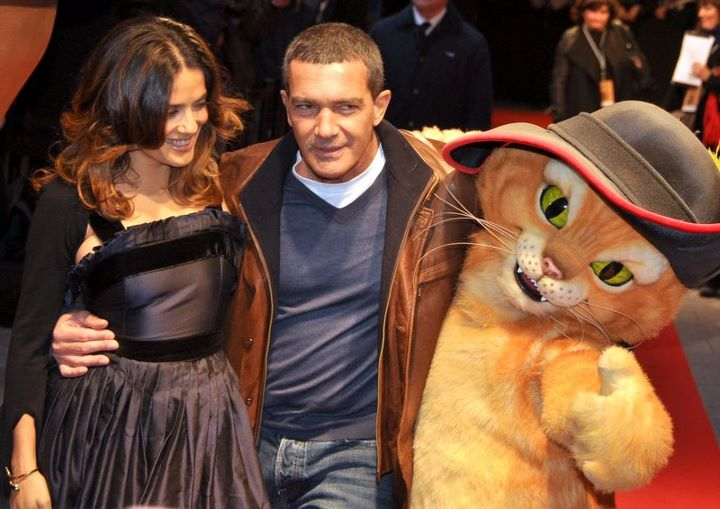
Salma Hayek, Antonio Banderas and a costumed Puss in Boots at a premiere of the film in Paris.

- Antonio Banderas as Puss in Boots, a fugitive orange tabby cat trying to restore his reputation as the hero of San Ricardo.
- Salma Hayek as Kitty Softpaws, a street-savvy Tuxedo cat who is Puss' female counterpart and love interest.
- Zach Galifianakis as Humpty Alexander Dumpty, the mastermind who intends to retrieve the Golden Eggs from the one-of-a-kind Goose.
- Billy Bob Thornton and Amy Sedaris as Jack and Jill respectively, a murderous outlaw married couple who own the three legendary magical beans.
- Constance Marie as Imelda, Puss' human adoptive mother
- Mike Mitchell as Andy "Jack" Beanstalk
- Guillermo del Toro as Comandante, the military leader of San Ricardo dispatched to capture Puss
- Chris Miller as Little Boy Blue, Friar Miller, Prison Guard, Manuel and Rafael

== Production ==
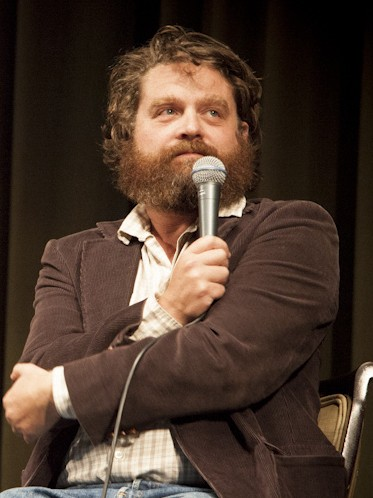
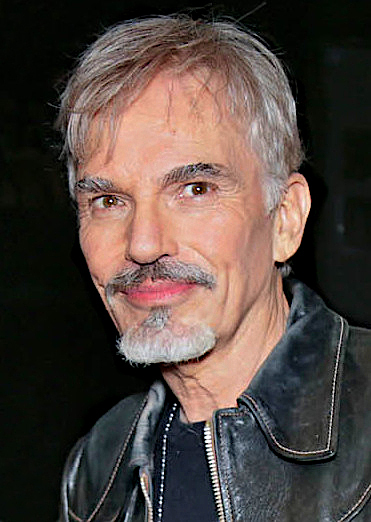
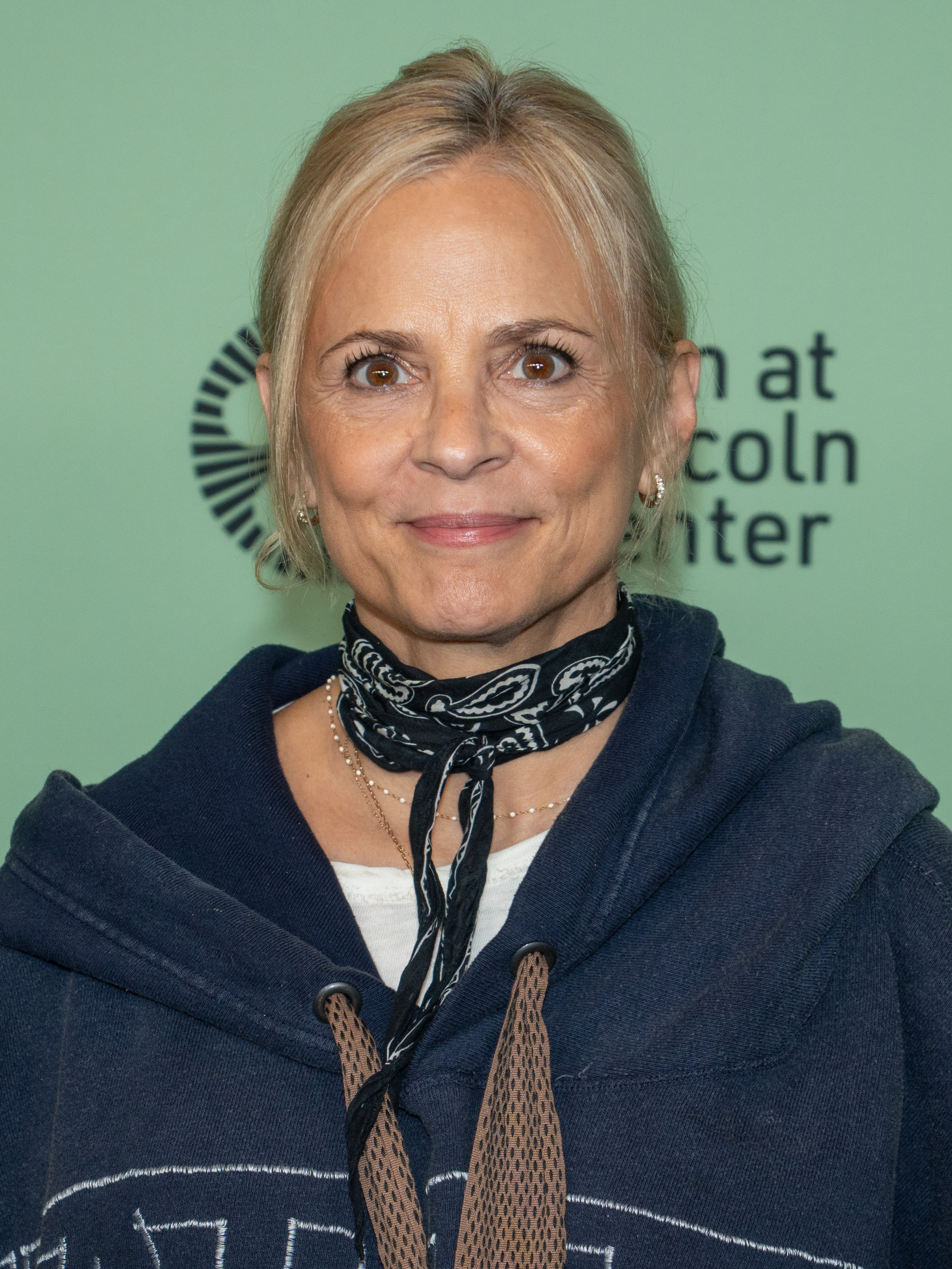
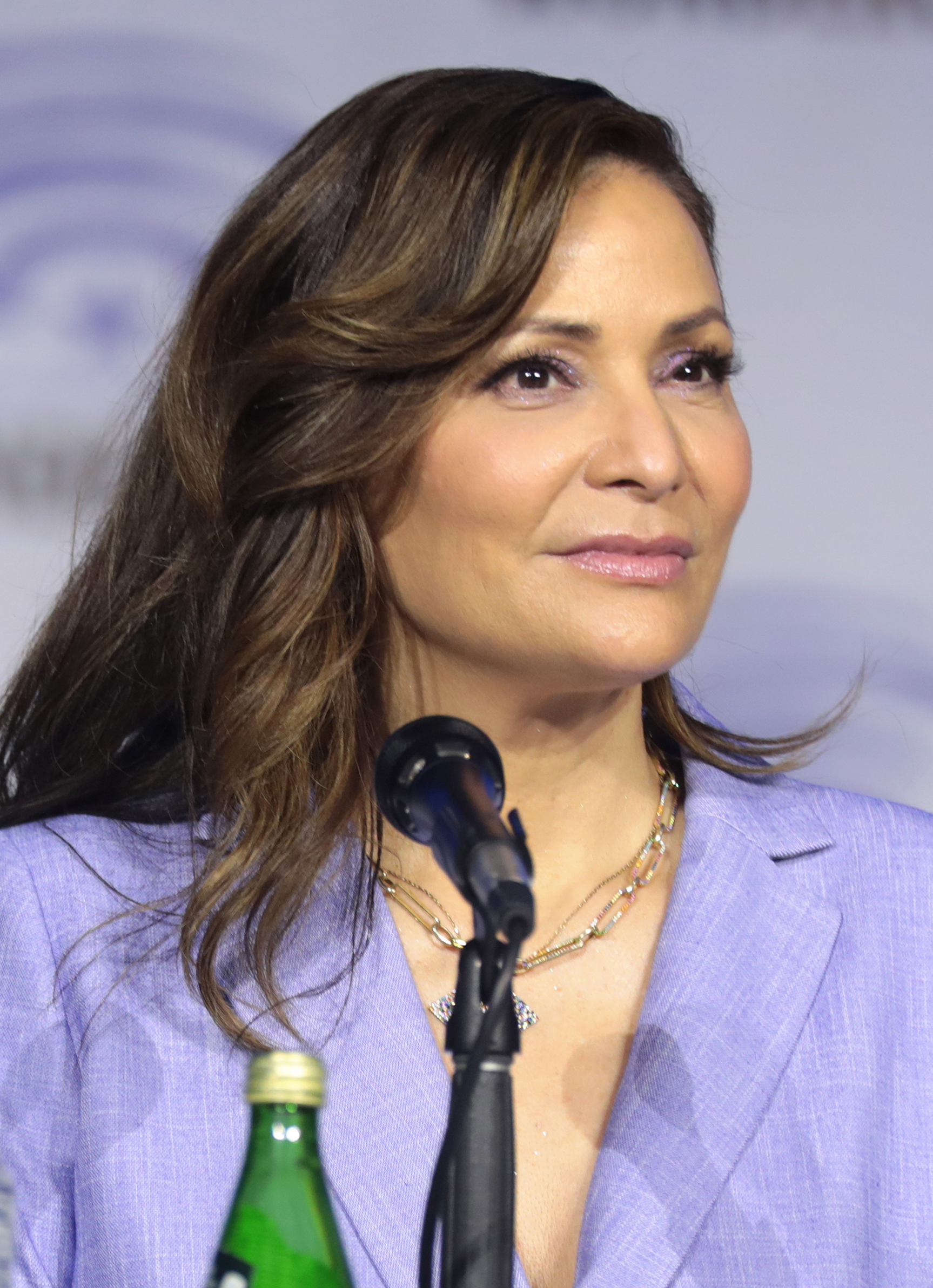
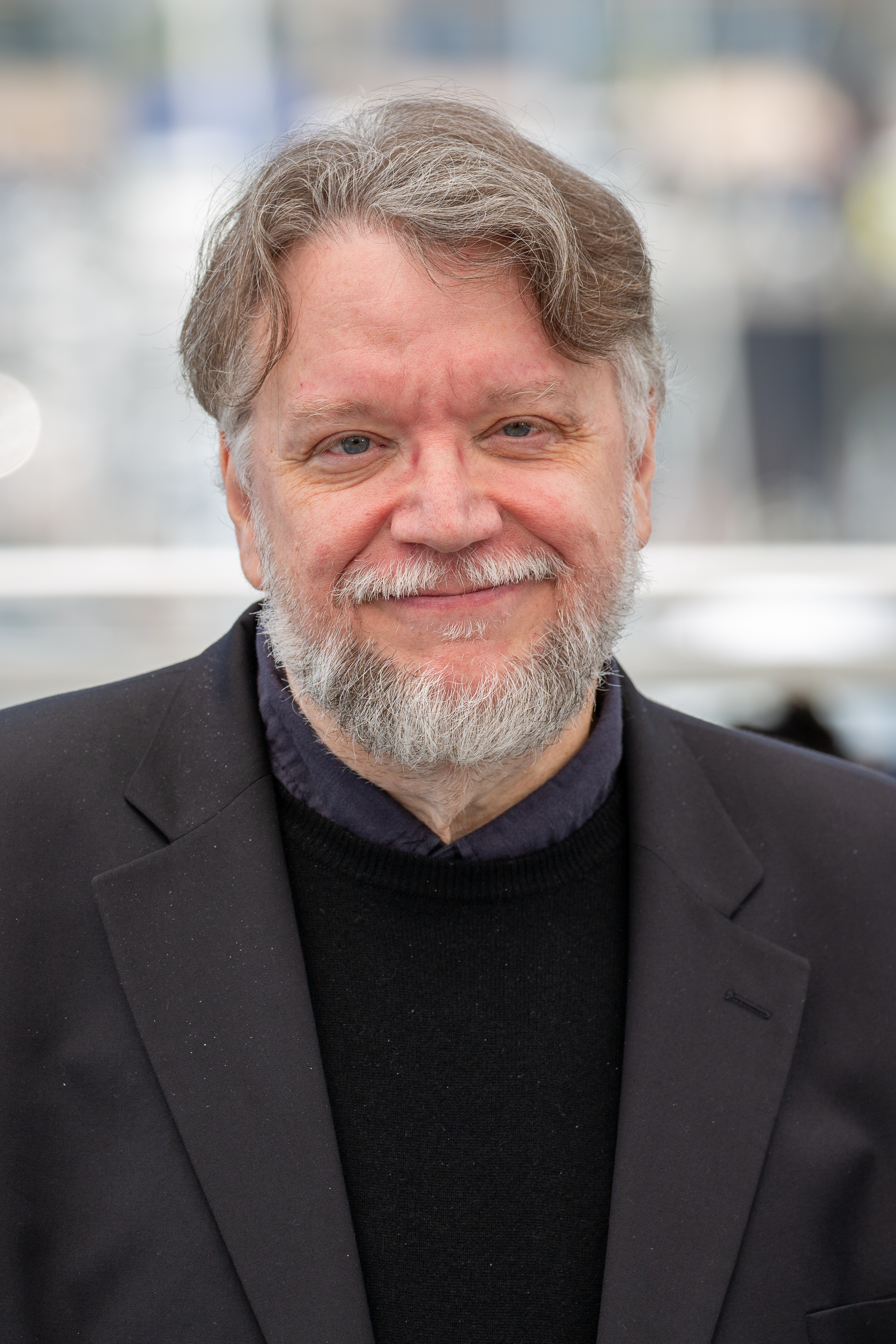
Top: Zach Galifianakis, Billy Bob Thornton and Amy Sedaris provide the voices for Humpty Alexander Dumpty, Jack and Jill. Bottom: Constance Marie and Guillermo del Toro voices Imelda and Comandante.

The film had been in development since 2004, when Shrek 2 was released. Chris Miller, who worked as head of story in Shrek 2, was a big proponent of making a spin-off film centered on Puss in Boots due to his love for the character and the intriguing story potential he had, given the adventures he mentions to have had in the film. As a Shrek 2 spin-off, it was initially planned for release in 2008 as a direct-to-video film, then titled Puss in Boots: The Story of an Ogre Killer. By October 2006, the film was re-slated as a theatrical release due to market conditions and DreamWorks Animation's realization that the Puss character deserved more. Miller was hired to direct the film immediately after directing Shrek the Third.

In September 2010, Guillermo del Toro signed on as executive producer. Having exited from The Hobbit, del Toro was invited by the crew to watch an early screening of the film, half animated and half storyboarded, which del Toro loved and asked them if he could be somehow involved in the production. Discussing del Toro, Miller stated, "We worked out a system for him to come in once every few months or whenever we had something new to show him. If we needed someone to bounce ideas off of, he was always there, and if we had a problem we were tackling, we'd get Guillermo on the red phone – our emergency phone – and ask him for advice on what we should do with a certain character or scene. It was like having our own film school". Miller stated that del Toro was particularly involved in Humpty Dumpty's character design, suggesting to "make him more like da Vinci". It was del Toro's idea to make Humpty "an ingenious freak of nature" who builds contraptions such as a flying machine. Del Toro rewrote the ending to redeem the character and deepen his relationship with Puss – an unconventional conclusion for a family film. He helped design the fantasy elements of the giant's castle, as well as the architecture of the town, which he conceived as "an amalgam of Spain and Mexico".

During the film's production, the filmmakers struggled for a long time about including the Giant from "Jack and the Beanstalk", an English fairy tale from which the magic beans and the castle in the clouds were borrowed. As the filmmakers had already figured out the Giant's world, the Giant itself was challenging for them. They wanted to depict him faithfully like the classic fairy tale legend giant, but despite how hard they tried to incorporate him into the story, his presence turned out to be predictable. In the end, it was decided to have the Giant killed off offscreen in order to subvert fairy tales’ expectations.

Antonio Banderas reprised his role as Puss in Boots from the Shrek films. According to Miller, the crew wanted to cast Zach Galifianakis, Billy Bob Thornton, Amy Sedaris, and Salma Hayek early on during production. As Humpty Dumpty was Galifianakis' first voiceover role, he was allowed to improvise by the filmmakers. Similarly, Thornton enjoyed the experience of voicing Jack as he was looking to challenge himself with a role out of his comfort zone. Sedaris, with whom Miller had worked before on Shrek the Third, improvised most of her dialogue as Jill, giving almost fifty different versions of her scripted lines. Except for Puss, the film features new characters. Citing the co-writer, David H. Steinberg, "It doesn't overlap with Shrek at all. Partly that was done to tell an original Puss story, but partly because we didn't know what Shrek 4 was going to do with the characters and we couldn't write conflicting storylines." The film was teased in Shrek Forever After, when Shrek finally shuts the book titled "Shrek", and puts it away next to a book titled "Puss in Boots".

Puss in Boots is the first DreamWorks Animation film that was partly made in India. A Bangalore studio owned by Technicolor, which had mainly worked on TV specials and DVD bonus material, spent six months animating three major scenes in the film. The outsourcing had financial advantages, with 40% fewer labor costs than in the US, but the primary reason for outsourcing to India was the lack of personnel, due to the studio producing as many as three films a year.

== Music ==
Henry Jackman, the composer for Puss in Boots, utilized folk instruments of traditional Latin music. Inspired by Spanish composer Manuel de Falla, Jackman blended guitars and Latin percussion with an orchestral sound influenced by Claude Debussy and Maurice Ravel. Mexican guitar duo Rodrigo y Gabriela contributed to Jackman's score, and two of their songs, "Diablo Rojo" and "Hanuman", were included in the soundtrack. Lady Gaga's song "Americano" was also featured in the film. The soundtrack for the film, featuring the original score by Jackman, was released on October 26, 2011, by Sony Classical.

On December 5, 2011, Paramount and DreamWorks released the complete score as part of their "For Your Consideration" (FYC) campaign.

== Release ==
Puss in Boots was originally set for release on March 30, 2012, but was moved ahead to November 4, 2011, taking over the release date of Rise of the Guardians, however it was instead pushed a week earlier to October 28, 2011. Anne Globe, head of worldwide marketing for DreamWorks Animation, said the decision to move the film's release date a week earlier was to attract parents and their children to see the film before other family-friendly films were released in November 2011.

The film was renamed Cat in Boots in the United Arab Emirates for officially unknown reasons, but it is suspected for religious and cultural reasons. According to the UAE's The National Media Council, which is responsible for censorship, the UAE didn't have any involvement in the rename and that "the decision to change the name had been made by the Hollywood studio and the movie distributors in the UAE." Consequently, since the film's distributor was based in the UAE, the same print was syndicated to all theaters throughout the Middle East. However, the name change was limited to the film's original theatrical run, as merchandise and later regional home media releases retained the film's original title.

Puss in Boots had its world premiere on October 16, 2011, docking the Royal Caribbean International's cruise ship Allure of the Seas, docked in Fort Lauderdale, Florida, at the time. It was theatrically released in the United States on October 28, 2011. The film was digitally re-mastered into IMAX 3D, and was released in 268 North American IMAX theaters and at least 47 IMAX theaters outside North America.

=== Home media ===
Puss in Boots was released on DVD, Blu-ray, and Blu-ray 3D on February 24, 2012. The movie was accompanied by a short animated film titled Puss in Boots: The Three Diablos. It grossed $72.3 million in home video sales and was the tenth best-selling title of 2012.

Another featured extra short is "Klepto Kitty"; a three-minute profile of Dusty the Klepto Kitty, a notorious cat in California who steals items from neighbors' yards, some of it captured on a night vision kitty-cam, hung around Dusty's neck by the Animal Planet network for their own documentary.

Puss in Boots was released on 4K Ultra HD Blu-ray on November 22, 2022, one month before the sequel was released.

== Reception ==
=== Box office ===
Puss in Boots grossed $149.2 million in the United States and Canada, and $405.7 million in other countries, for a worldwide total of $555 million. It was the eleventh highest-grossing film of 2011 and is also the third highest-grossing animated film that year behind Kung Fu Panda 2 ($665.7 million) and Cars 2 ($559.9 million).

In North America, Puss in Boots topped the box office on its opening day with $9.6 million. On its opening weekend, the film made $34.1 million, topping Saw III's record ($33.6 million) for the highest Halloween weekend opening ever. It held this record for 12 years until Five Nights at Freddy's ($80 million) surpassed it in 2023. The film retained first place during its second weekend, with $33.1 million, declining only 3%. By this point, it had the smallest decline of any non-holiday film, surpassing Twister.

Outside North America, on its opening weekend, it earned second place with $17.2 million. The film opened at #1 in both the UK with a weekend gross of £1.98 million ($3.1 million), and Australia, with $2.98 million. It topped the box office outside North America on its seventh weekend with $47.1 million from 40 countries. It ranks as the ninth highest-grossing film of 2011 outside North America. Its highest-grossing country after North America was Russia and the CIS ($50.6 million), followed by Germany ($33.9 million) and France and the Maghreb region ($33.2 million).

=== Critical response ===
On Rotten Tomatoes, Puss in Boots has an approval rating of 85% based on 151 reviews, with an average rating of 6.8/10. The site's critical consensus reads, "It isn't deep or groundbreaking, but what it lacks in profundity, Puss in Boots more than makes up for with an abundance of wit, visual sparkle, and effervescent charm." Metacritic gave Puss in Boots a weighted average score of 65 out of 100 based on 24 critics, indicating "generally favorable reviews". CinemaScore polls reported that the average grade moviegoers gave the film was an "A−" on an A+ to F scale.

Todd McCarthy of The Hollywood Reporter gave the film a positive review, saying "Puss in Boots is a perfectly diverting romp that happens to showcase some of the best 3D work yet from a mainstream animated feature. Colorful, clever enough, free of cloying showbiz in-jokes, action-packed without being ridiculous about it, and even well choreographed." Peter Debruge of Variety gave the film a positive review, saying "Puss' origin story could easily stand on its own – a testament to clever writing on the part of its creative team and an irresistible central performance by Antonio Banderas." Christy Lemire of the Associated Press gave the film three out of four stars, saying "For quick, lively, family-friendly entertainment, "Puss in Boots" works just fine, even in 3-D, which is integrated thoughtfully into the narrative and doesn't just feel like a gimmick." Bill Goodykoontz of The Arizona Republic gave the film three and a half stars out of five, saying "As good as Banderas and Hayek are together, Galifianakis is better, making Humpty-Dumpty, of all people, one of the more intriguing animated characters to come along in a while. He's a nice surprise." Moira MacDonald of The Seattle Times gave the film three out of four stars, saying "I left dreaming of a world in which cats could tango – and when's the last time a movie did that?" Marjorie Baumgarten of The Austin Chronicle gave the film three out of five stars, saying "The seductive interplay of Banderas and Hayek, the barely recognizable vocal contributions of Galifianakis, and the Southern backwoods speech of Thornton and Sedaris all keep us attuned to the events on the screen."

Owen Gleiberman of Entertainment Weekly gave the film a C, saying "In the Shrek films, the joke of Puss in Boots, with his trilled consonants and penchant for chest-puffing sword duels, is that no one this cuddly should try to be this dashing. But in Puss in Boots, that joke wears out its welcome in 15 minutes." Ty Burr of The Boston Globe gave the film three out of four stars, saying "Puss in Boots doesn't break any new ground in the storytelling department, and its reliance on go-go-go state-of-the-art action sequences grows wearying by the end, but the movie has a devilish wit that works for parent and child alike." Elizabeth Weitzman of the New York Daily News gave the film four out of five stars, saying "It's always a pleasure to find a family film that respects its audience all the way up the line." Colin Covert of the Star Tribune gave the film one and a half stars out of four, saying "Remember that toy where you yank a string and hear the sound of a barnyard animal? "Puss in Boots" has about half as much entertainment value." Olly Richards of Empire gave the film three out of five stars, saying "Like most kittens, it's not always perfectly behaved, but at least this new Puss adventure doesn't have you reaching for the cinematic spray bottle. And thank goodness the spin-off does nothing to neuter the charismatic cat's appeal." Stan Hall of The Oregonian gave the film a B, saying "Puss in Boots isn't particularly deep, nor does it take itself seriously – it just wants to seek glory, win affection and cash in. Done, done and done."

Kenneth Turan of the Los Angeles Times gave the film four out of five stars, saying "Perhaps the most engaging thing about "Puss in Boots" is that it never takes itself too seriously." Stephen Holden of The New York Times gave the film three and a half stars out of five, saying "It is a cheerfully chaotic jumble of fairy tale and nursery rhyme characters parachuted into a Spanish storybook setting." Claudia Puig of USA Today gave the film three out of four stars, saying "With his impeccable comic timing and lyrical Spanish accent, Banderas' swashbuckling charmer is an undeniable treat." Michael O'Sullivan of The Washington Post gave the film three out of four stars, saying "Puss in Boots" proves there is at least one cat with multiple lives. The feature-length animated spinoff – a star turn for the popular "Shrek" supporting character voiced by Antonio Banderas – is almost shockingly good. And not just because a lot of you will approach it with lowered expectations." Stephen Whitty of the Newark Star-Ledger gave the film three out of four stars, saying "An almost purr-fect little film that even a dog owner can enjoy."

Joe Morgenstern of The Wall Street Journal gave the film a positive review, saying "Puss made his debut in "Shrek 2," then did time in the two decreasingly funny sequels. Now he's got a movie of his own, and not a moment too soon." Lisa Kennedy of The Denver Post gave the film three out of four stars, saying "It would overstate matters to say Puss in Boots leaves its cat holding the bag (we had to get that in). But it also leaves its hero awaiting a richer fable, one befitting his charms and his portrayer's talents." Anna Smith of Time Out gave the film three out of five stars, saying "Puss in Boots is uneven, but when it's on course, cat fans will be in heaven." Amy Biancolli of the Houston Chronicle gave the film three out of five stars, saying "Puss in Boots prances along on three basic truths. One, cats are funny. Two, vain Spanish cats in high-heeled musketeer boots are even funnier. Lastly, booted, vain Spanish cats voiced by a breathy Antonio Banderas are flat-out hilarious." Tasha Robinson of The A.V. Club gave the film a C+, saying "Puss In Boots makes a great theme-park ride, a thrill-a-minute feast for the eyes and the semicircular canals. But while the settings are impressively multidimensional, the characters are flatter than old-school cel drawings."

=== Accolades ===
Award	Category	Recipient	Result
Academy Awards	Best Animated Feature	Chris Miller	Nominated
Alliance of Women Film Journalists	Best Animated Film		Nominated
Alliance of Women Film Journalists	Best Animated Female	Salma Hayek	Nominated
Annie Awards	Best Animated Feature		Nominated
Annie Awards	Animated Effects in an Animated Production	Can Yuksel	Nominated
Annie Awards	Character Animation in a Feature Production	Olivier Staphylas	Nominated
Annie Awards	Character Design in a Feature Production	Patrick Mate	Nominated
Annie Awards	Directing in a Feature Production	Chris Miller	Nominated
Annie Awards	Music in a Feature Production	Henry Jackman	Nominated
Annie Awards	Storyboarding in a Feature Production	Bob Logan	Nominated
Annie Awards	Voice Acting in a Feature Production	Zach Galifianakis	Nominated
Annie Awards	Editing in a Feature Production	Erika Dapkewicz	Nominated
Critics' Choice Awards	Best Animated Feature		Nominated
Chicago Film Critics Association Awards	Animated Film		Nominated
Golden Globe Awards	Best Animated Feature Film		Nominated
Kids Choice Awards	Favorite Animated Movie		Won
Kids Choice Awards	Favorite Voice From an Animated Movie	Antonio Banderas	Nominated
Producers Guild of America Awards	Best Animated Theatrical Motion Pictures	Joe M. Aguilar, Latifa Ouaou	Nominated
Satellite Awards	Best Animated or Mixed Media Film		Nominated
Saturn Awards	Best Animated Film		Won
Teen Choice Awards	Choice Movie Actress Action/Adventure	Salma Hayek	Nominated
Toronto Film Critics Association	Best Animated Feature		Nominated
Visual Effects Society Awards	Outstanding Visual Effects in an Animated Feature Motion Picture	Joe M. Aguilar, Guillaume Aretos, Ken Bielenberg, Chris Miller	Nominated
Visual Effects Society Awards	Outstanding Animated Character in an Animated Feature Motion Picture	Antonio Banderas, Ludovic Boouancheau, Laurent Caneiro, Olivier Staphylas for "Puss"	Nominated
Visual Effects Society Awards	Outstanding Created Environment in an Animated Feature Motion Picture	Guillaume Aretos, Greg Lev, Brett Miller, Peter Zaslav for "The Cloud World"	Nominated
Washington D.C. Area Film Critics Association Awards	Best Animated Feature		Nominated
Women Film Critics Circle	Best Animated Females		Won

== Future ==
=== Web-series ===
Peacock Kids YouTube channel during 2014-2016 produced the web-series New Puss in Boots. Some of the episodes were later released on the Peacock website.

=== Television series ===
The film also spawned an animated series that premiered on Netflix on January 16, 2015. It aired 78 episodes across six seasons, with its final season released on the streaming service on January 26, 2018. The series is set before the events of the movie. Eric Bauza voices the titular character.

=== Sequel ===
In February 2012, director Chris Miller stated that he would love to make a Puss in Boots sequel as the character was set up to have more fantastic, surreal and funnier adventures, but that they would first analyze how the audience reacted to the film and whether they would want a sequel. In November 2012, executive producer Guillermo del Toro said that they already did a couple of script drafts for a sequel, and that Miller wants to take Puss on an adventure to exotic places. In April 2014, Antonio Banderas, the voice of Puss, said that the work on the sequel had just begun. In June 2014, the movie was titled Puss in Boots 2: Nine Lives & 40 Thieves and was scheduled to be released on November 2, 2018. Two months later, it was moved one month to December 21, 2018. In January 2015, Puss in Boots 2 was removed from the release schedule following a corporate restructuring and DreamWorks Animation's new policy to release two films a year. Two months later, Banderas said in an interview that the script was under restructuring, and that Shrek may appear in the film.

On November 6, 2018, it was announced by Variety that Illumination's CEO Chris Meledandri had been tasked to be one of the executive producers of both Shrek 5 and Puss in Boots 2, with the cast returning. In February 2019, Bob Persichetti, the head of story on the first film and a co-director of Spider-Man: Into the Spider-Verse (2018), signed on to direct the sequel. Latifa Ouaou, who produced the original Puss in Boots film, would oversee development of the sequel alongside Meledandri. In August 2020, the name Puss in Boots: The Last Wish had been trademarked by DreamWorks, revealing the new title of the sequel.

In March 2021, the film received a new release date of September 23, 2022, with DWA's parent company Universal Pictures now handling distribution following NBCUniversal's acquisition of DWA in 2016. Persichetti and Ouaou were respectively replaced by Joel Crawford and Mark Swift as director and producer after having previously done so on The Croods: A New Age (2020), while Antonio Banderas was also confirmed to be reprising his role as Puss. The film's first trailer was released on March 15, 2022. Salma Hayek was later confirmed to reprise her role as Kitty Softpaws, while other cast members of the film include Florence Pugh (as Goldilocks), Olivia Colman, Wagner Moura, Ray Winstone, John Mulaney, Da'Vine Joy Randolph, Harvey Guillén (as Perrito the Dog), Anthony Mendez, and Samson Kayo. In April 2022, the film's release date was further pushed to December 21, 2022.

== Video games ==
- Puss in Boots, a video game based on the film, developed by Blitz Games, and published by THQ on October 25, 2011, for Xbox 360, PlayStation 3, Wii, and Nintendo DS. It features support for Kinect and PlayStation Move on the respective platforms.
- Fruit Ninja: Puss in Boots, a Puss in Boots-themed Fruit Ninja video game, which was released on October 20, 2011, on the iOS App Store, and was released for Android devices on November 28, 2011, on the Amazon Appstore.
