= Gravity Guy =

2010 endless runner video game

- App icon
- Developer: Miniclip
- Publisher: Miniclip
- Release: December 8, 2010: iOS, Web & Symbian OS December 8, 2010 macOS March 10, 2011 Windows Phone & MeeGo September 7, 2011 Android November 23, 2011 Microsoft Windows November 28, 2012
- Genre: Side-scrolling endless runner
- Modes: Single-player, multiplayer

Gravity Guy is a 2010 side-scrolling endless runner action arcade video game developed and published by Miniclip.

== Availability ==
Gravity Guy was first released for iOS on the App Store and Symbian OS on Nokia Store on December 8, 2010 and also available on Miniclip website using Flash at the time of release. It was later released for macOS on Mac App Store on March 10, 2011, for Windows Phone on Windows Phone Store on September 7, 2011, for Android on Google Play on November 23, 2011 and for Windows 8, Windows 8.1 and Windows 10 on Microsoft Store on November 28, 2012. On July 15, 2013, the game was updated on the App Store to support the iPhone 5. This was the last update of the game for iOS. As of late 2018, the game is no longer available on the App Store, Google Play Store or Microsoft Store.

== Gameplay ==
The player controls Gravity Guy by tapping the screen (or pressing the keyboard space bar key on the computer versions) to switch gravity. The objective is to run as far as possible while avoiding obstacles that can trap the main character (who can be killed by a police officer), falling or flying off the screen. If killed, the player returns to the last checkpoint taken.

The three modes in the game are Story Mode, Endless and Practice. Story mode features up to sixty levels for both "Run" and "Rescue", thirty levels for each part of the story, with up to fifteen levels in the original Flash game. Endless mode consists of randomly generated levels while Practice mode goes through the levels from the story without the police officer. The game also contains a multiplayer mode, allowing up to four players (using Game Center on iOS or locally) to play the game.

== Free version ==
The free version of Gravity Guy for iOS and Android was released in 2011. On iOS it features only 10 levels, 1 theme, 2 slow motions and 2 shields. The free Android app is like the full version with only 2 slow motions, 2 shields, and Ads (to unlock Ads user must buy the full version). Gravity Guy's full version went free for a limited time for the iOS on the App Store in May 2013 prior to the release of the sequel called Gravity Guy 2. The free version of the game was updated on July 15, 2013 for the iOS on the App Store to support the iPhone 5.

== Sequel and remake ==
The sequel to Gravity Guy, called Gravity Guy 2, with a more human character, was released in March 2013 for Xbox Live on Windows Phone. It was released for iOS on May 15, 2013 and Android on October 2, 2013.

An online HTML5 remake of the original Gravity Guy was created March 2021 and was added to the Miniclip website. The changes of the remake include a brand new art-style, a story campaign, voice acting, local multiplayer and a new original soundtrack. The remake replaces the original Flash version of the game due to the Adobe Flash Player no longer being officially supported.

== See also ==
- Jetpack Joyride, whose main character can obtain a vehicle called the "Gravity Suit" that is similar to the character from this game.
- List of Xbox games on Windows
- List of Xbox games on Windows Phone
- List of iOS games
