= Age of Zombies =

2010 video game

- Developer: Halfbrick Studios
- Publishers: Halfbrick Studios; BlitWorks (Vita)
- Platforms: PlayStation Portable, PlayStation 3, iOS, Android, PlayStation Vita, Ouya
- Release: PSP, PS3; February 25, 2010 iOS; October 28, 2010; Android; June 28, 2011; PlayStation Vita: PAL: December 18, 2013; NA: January 14, 2014; JP: March 23, 2017; Ouya; July 1, 2014
- Genres: Action-adventure, shoot 'em up, survival horror
- Mode: Single-player

Age of Zombies is an action-adventure survival horror video game developed and published by Halfbrick Studios. It was released for PlayStation Portable, PlayStation 3 and iOS in 2010, for Android in 2011, for PlayStation Vita in 2013, and for Ouya in 2014.

== Reception ==
Reception

Aggregate score
Aggregator	Score		
Aggregator	iOS	PS Vita	PSP
Metacritic	81/100	74/100	79/100

Review scores
Publication	Score		
Publication	iOS	PS Vita	PSP
Destructoid	N/A	N/A	8/10
Eurogamer	6/10	N/A	N/A
GamePro	4.5/5	N/A	N/A
GameRevolution	N/A	8/10	B−
GameSpot	N/A	N/A	7/10
GameZone	N/A	7/10	N/A
IGN	9/10	N/A	9/10
PlayStation Official Magazine – UK	N/A	N/A	9/10
Pocket Gamer	3.5/5	N/A	3.5/5

The iOS and PSP versions received "generally favorable reviews", while the PS Vita version received "mixed or average reviews", according to the review aggregation website Metacritic.
