= Blobster =

2011 video game

- Developer(s): Divine Robot
- Publisher(s): Chillingo
- Platform(s): iOS
- Release: July 14, 2011
- Genre(s): Puzzle-platform

Blobster is a puzzle-platform game developed by Swedish studio Divine Robot and published by Chillingo for iOS. The game uses both accelerometer and touch controls to guide a blob through levels of increasing complexity.
