= Fruit Ninja: Puss in Boots =

2011 video game

- Fruit Ninja: Puss in Boots logo
- Developer: Halfbrick Studios
- Publisher: Halfbrick Studios
- Producers: DreamWorks; THQ
- Series: Fruit Ninja
- Platforms: iOS, Android
- Release: October 20, 2011
- Genre: Arcade

Fruit Ninja: Puss in Boots is a mobile video game developed and published by Halfbrick Studios. A spin-off from the highly successful Fruit Ninja, it is also a crossover of the 2011 animated film Puss in Boots. The game was released on October 20, 2011.

== Gameplay ==
Fruit Ninja: Puss in Boots is an action game with many similarities to Fruit Ninja. The players are able to swipe across the screen to cut various types of fruit as they appear. Each sliced fruit will raise the score for a certain number of points, with bombs that appear occasionally.

The game features two new modes: Desperado and Bandito. A new take on Fruit Ninja's Classic Mode, Desperado Mode features new Magic Beans with new waves and more fruits. The session ends if three fruits get off the screen without being sliced, or if only one bomb explodes. Each Magic Bean will give 25 points in case none of the lives are lost in that moment. It can also restore hearts if the player has lost at least one life.

Developed exclusively for Fruit Ninja: Puss in Boots, Bandito Mode is a challenge adventure that consists of three Acts and the Finale, where the players must work through a number of increasingly difficult and varied mini-games that are chosen by random. For each mini-game, the overall score is based on the sliced fruit count, swipes per fruit, and reflexes. Puss in Boots will make remarks and comments during the play, voiced by Antonio Banderas.

The dojo from Fruit Ninja has been re-branded to Stash. It contains new blades and three themed backgrounds to unlock, by completing specific goals. There is a support for the platforms like OpenFeint and Game Center.

== Release ==
Designed to be a movie tie-in, the game was released for iOS on October 20, 2011. After that, it appeared for Android exclusively for the Amazon Marketplace on November 28, 2011.

== Reception ==
Reception

Aggregate score
Aggregator	Score
Metacritic	79/100

Review scores
Publication	Score
4Players	76%
Gamezebo	4/5
IGN	8.5/10
Pocket Gamer	3.5/5
TouchArcade	4.5/5
Slide to Play	3/4
The A.V. Club	D+

The game has received generally favourable reviews, with a Metacritic score of 79 out of 100 based on 12 reviews.

TouchArcade said, "If you could only have one Fruit Ninja game on your phone, I'd tell you to keep the original. It has a lot more to offer. But Fruit Ninja: Puss in Boots is well worth playing, even if it's more expansion than stand-alone". IGN said, "Like Angry Birds Rio, Fruit Ninja: Puss in Boots is a much better game than it needed to be". AppSpy said, "Fruit Ninja: Puss in Boots shows how to make movie tie-in's work without being overbearing; Bandito mode brings a real Arcade flair to the original Fruit Ninja formula, while thematic touches give the game charm".
