= Jetpack Joyride =

2011 endless runner video game

- Developer: Halfbrick Studios
- Publishers: Halfbrick Studios; Beatshapers (PSP); Big Ant Studios (PSV, PS3, PS4); Storms (KaiOS)
- Platforms: iOS, Flash, Android, PlayStation 3, PlayStation 4, PlayStation Portable, PlayStation Vita, BlackBerry PlayBook, BlackBerry 10, Windows Phone, Windows, KaiOS, tvOS
- Release: September 1, 2011: iOS; WW: September 1, 2011 Web; WW: May 11, 2012 Android; WW: September 28, 2012 PSP; NA: November 20, 2012; EU: November 21, 2012 BlackBerry PlayBook; WW: December 13, 2012 PS3 & Vita; EU: December 21, 2012; NA: December 31, 2012 BlackBerry 10; WW: March 6, 2013 Windows Phone; WW: June 5, 2013 Windows; WW: June 5, 2013 PS4; WW: April 26, 2016 KaiOS; WW: August 26, 2021
- Genre: Endless runner
- Mode: Single-player

Jetpack Joyride is a 2011 endless runner action game created by Halfbrick Studios. It was released for iOS devices on the App Store on September 1, 2011 and has been ported to other systems. It was released online as a Flash version on May 11, 2012; on Android on September 28; on PlayStation Portable (via PlayStation Network, ported by Beatshapers) on November 20 in North America and November 21 in Europe; on BlackBerry PlayBook on December 13, 2012; on PlayStation 3 and PlayStation Vita (via PlayStation Network, ported by Big Ant Studios) on December 21 in Europe and December 31 in North America; on BlackBerry 10 on March 6, 2013; and on Windows Phone 8 and Windows 8 on June 5. It was also released on PlayStation 4 on April 26, 2016. A mobile version using the keypad was released in 2021 for KaiOS devices.

The game features the same protagonist from Age of Zombies and Monster Dash, Barry Steakfries, who the player controls as he steals a bullet-powered jet pack from a top-secret laboratory, being a direct spin-off of the latter game. The game has been met with favourable reviews and has won numerous awards.

Jetpack Joyride is considered to be one of the best mobile games of all time.

== Gameplay ==
Barry flies through a volcano-like background. Below him is a scientist and in front of him is an electric zapper.

The game uses a simple, one-touch system to control the jetpack; when the player presses anywhere on the touchscreen, the jetpack fires and Barry rises. When the player lets go, the jetpack turns off, and Barry falls. Because he is continually in motion, the player does not control his speed, simply his movement along the vertical axis.

The objective of the game is to travel as far as possible, collect coins, and avoid hazards such as zappers, missiles and high-intensity laser beams. Contact with any of these obstacles would result in instant death, although Barry's body will tumble and slide for an additional distance upon dying. As the player travels, golden coloured "Spin Tokens" occasionally appear, which the player can collect. At the end of each run, these spin tokens are used in a slot machine (one token gives one spin) which can award the player various prizes, including coins, additional spin tokens, a head-start, a player revival, and explosives that can propel the player's body for an additional distance after death. If the player does not wish to spin the slot, they can cash in all remaining spin tokens for 100 coins each.

Rainbow-coloured boxes with gears can also be found throughout the game. When touched by the player, these boxes provide Barry with a vehicle which lasts until he hits an obstacle. The available vehicles are "Bad As Hog" (a chopper motorcycle), "Mr. Cuddles" (a mecha dragon), "Crazy Freaking Teleporter" (a teleportation device), "Gravity Suit" (the suit used by Gravity Guy, enables gravitational reversing), "Profit Bird" (a bird-shaped plane which ejects banknotes), "Lil Stomper" (a large mech suit), "Wave Rider" (a jet ski), and "Sleigh of Awesome" (a sleigh drawn by two reindeer). In later special events, six additional vehicles were made available: a "Hoverboard" and the "DeLorean Time Machine" (both from Back to the Future), the "Ecto-1" (from Ghostbusters), "Voyager Shuttlecraft" from (Star Trek), and "Cryo Thrusters" (a pair of ice skates). Most of these vehicles are also available in Magnetic and Golden upgrades that can be purchased for coins in "The Stash" (the in-game store). In a later update, the "Strong Arm Machine" (S.A.M.) was introduced: the only obstacles faced while driving the S.A.M. are missiles, which the player must deflect with its arm. This vehicle, unlike the others, is only available after the player has collected three puzzle pieces, spelling "SAM", in one day. If the player activates the S.A.M. five days in a row, a special costume is made available as a reward.

The Stash also sells aesthetic upgrades such as character outfits and different jetpacks. Most of these items do not alter the gameplay in any way, though alternative jetpacks can be useful in achieving some of the missions (such as travelling a distance without harming any scientists). Limited use utilities are also for sale, as are gadgets and vehicle upgrades. Gadgets provide permanent enhancements for the player, but Barry can have only two gadgets equipped at any one time, however, they can purchase an item that permanently increases that number to 3. Players can also access their profile from within The Stash, view achievements on Game Center or Google Play Games, and purchase coins with real world money.

At any time in the game, the player is provided with three missions, such as high-fiving (running past) a certain number of scientists, avoiding coins for a set distance, flying close to a certain number of zappers, or having a near miss with a set number of missiles. Each individual mission carries one to three stars, depending on its difficulty. When each mission is completed, the stars are added to the player's experience level and a fresh mission appears (unless the player has enough missions to make it past level 15). Once the number of stars required for the experience level are obtained, the player's level increases and a coin reward is given. Once the highest level is reached, the player receives one of 125 badges selected at random, showing that the complete set of missions have been achieved, and starts the game with new missions. The level titles (e.g. "Graduate", "Ninja", etc.) remain the same, but the level numbers increase, so a player will start from level 16 with the title "Badger". Players can cash in stars multiple times once they reach the title "Barry", to collect more badges and reach a higher level number. Mission unlocks allow the player to get the stars for a mission without completing the mission through gameplay, at the cost of 500 coins per star.

== Synopsis ==
Barry Steakfries works as a salesman for a gramophone-making company, but the business is about to go bankrupt due to low sales. One day, as he walks down a street, sad because of the low sales, he finds one of the "top secret" laboratories of Legitimate Research and sees the Machine gun jetpack inside. Dreaming of using the jetpack to do good, Barry bursts through the wall of the laboratory and steals the experimental jetpack from the clutches of the scientists, thus beginning the game.

Barry's nationality is unknown, but he is usually depicted in tie-in media with an Australian accent.

== Development and release ==
The game was titled Machine Gun Jetpack during development. It was released on the App Store on September 1, 2011. Subsequent upgrades included add-ons such as different jetpacks, utilities and gadgets to assist the player, as well as providing support for the Retina display. The game was launched on Facebook as a Beta on May 11, 2012. It was subsequently ported to Android devices, PlayStation Portable, PlayStation 3, PlayStation Vita, BlackBerry PlayBook, BlackBerry 10, Windows Phone 8, and KaiOS.

== Reception and awards ==
Reception

Aggregate scores
Aggregator	Score
GameRankings	93.00% (iOS); 78.50% (PSP)
Metacritic	90/100 (iOS)

Review scores
Publication	Score
Destructoid	9/10
Eurogamer	8/10
IGN	9.0/10 (iOS); 7.4/10 (PSN)
148 Apps	5/5
AppSpy	5/5
Pocket Gamer	9/10
TouchArcade	5/5

Awards
Publication	Award
148Apps	Best App Ever 2011
Pocket Gamer	Best Action/Arcade Game (2012)
Pocket Gamer	Best iPhone/iPod Touch Game (2012)
Pocket Gamer	Best Overall Game (2012)
WWDC	Apple Design Award (2012)

Jetpack Joyride received predominantly positive reviews. The iOS version holds an aggregate score of 90 out of 100 on Metacritic, based on 27 reviews, and 93.00% on GameRankings, based on ten reviews. The PSP version holds a score of 78.50% on GameRankings, based on four reviews.

IGN's Justin Davis scored the iOS version 9 out of 10, calling it "the most addictive game from Halfbrick after the seminal Fruit Ninja", praising the random levels ("Halfbrick smartly included the perfect amount of randomness, to keep Joyride spicy. Players never quite know where the next missile will come from, or how the next set of lasers will be configured. It makes narrow escapes feel exhilarating"), boosts, and, especially, the "one more game" element of the three mission system. He was less impressed with the PSN version, scoring it 7.4 out of 10. He was critical of the lack of an online leaderboard (arguing "this makes Jetpack Joyride a high score game without any actual online competition") and the lack of HD graphics for the Vita and PlayStation 3, concluding that "Jetpack Joyride's inferior visuals, lack of online leaderboards and higher price tag make it inferior to the iOS and Android experience."

Eurogamer's Kristan Reed scored the game 8 out of 10, writing "Jetpack Joyride is further evidence of Halfbrick's unseemly knack for producing games designed to test both the battery life of handheld gaming platforms and the sanity of players. Needless to say, both run out eventually." Destructoid's Nick Chester scored it 9 out of 10, arguing that in the crowded field of endless runners, "Jetpack Joyride is comfortably the best in its class". He was particularly impressed with the mission system, depth of extra features and responsive controls, calling the game "a hallmark of excellence […] a supreme title."

TouchArcade's Eli Hodapp scored it 5 out of 5 and called it a game "you simply must own". Carter Dobson of 148Apps also scored it 5 out of 5, calling it "one of the best endless games on the App Store". AppSpy's Andrew Nesvadba also awarded a score of 5 out of 5, writing "While touch-to-fly style endless games are nothing new, Jetpack Joyride trumps them all by packing together gorgeous designs with fun gameplay and replay value that's bursting at the seams." AppSmile cited it as "a terrific example of iDevice gaming done just right." Pocket Gamer's Mark Brown scored it 9 out of 10, giving it a "Gold Award" and praising the gameplay, graphics and depth; "Jetpack Joyride is simplistic fun, but Halfbrick's suite of bonuses, unlockables, leaderboards, and achievements makes it near irresistible."

It was awarded "Best App Ever 2011" by 148Apps, and won Pocket Gamer's "Best Action/Arcade Game of the Year 2012", "iPhone/iPod Touch Game of the Year 2012" and "Overall Game of the Year 2012" awards. It was also nominated for "Best Casual Game" at the 2012 International Mobile Gaming Awards, losing to Sprinkle, and it was the runner-up "iPhone Game Of The Year" on the App Store's "App Store Rewind 2011", losing to Tiny Tower. During WWDC 2012, it was awarded the 2012 "Apple Design Award". During the 15th Annual Interactive Achievement Awards, the Academy of Interactive Arts & Sciences nominated Jetpack Joyride for "Casual Game of the Year".

== Sequel ==
On December 18, 2020, Halfbrick Studios announced a sequel to the game titled Jetpack Joyride 2: Bullet Rush. The studio also released an official trailer of the game. Jetpack Joyride 2 was in soft-launch phase in Australia, New Zealand and Canada until March 2022, when it was pulled from App Store and Google Play store, with Halfbrick explaining that the game had "entered a new closed phase of development for an indefinite period". The final game was released on August 19, 2022, as an exclusive title for Apple Arcade.

In addition, there is also a real-time tabletop adaptation of the game by Lucky Duck Games.
