= Monster Burner =

2011 mobile video game

- Developer: Ubisoft Montreal
- Publisher: Ubisoft
- Platforms: iOS, Windows Mobile
- Release: iOS; November 3, 2011; Windows Mobile; May 8, 2013
- Genre: Puzzle

Monster Burner is a puzzle video game developed by Ubisoft Montreal and published by Ubisoft; it was released for iOS and Windows Mobile.

== Gameplay ==
Enemies approach from the top of the screen and each one that reaches the bottom reduces the one player's hearts. To keep the hearts safe, the player must fling fireballs at the monsters from anywhere on the screen. For a bigger fireball that can hit more enemies, the player can hold their finger down before launching the fireball. Ricocheting shots off of walls will burn even more foes at once.

Monster Burner has several modes such as the Campaign mode, Level of the Day, Gold Rush, and Four Seasons. In the Campaign mode, you can play bonus game modes that are Survival, Revenge of the Enchantress, Spider Lair, and Fright Night.

== Reception ==
Reception

Aggregate score
Aggregator	Score
Metacritic	85/100

Review scores
Publication	Score
Gamezebo	90/100
Pocket Gamer	3.5/5

The iOS version received "favorable" reviews according to the review aggregation website Metacritic.

Slide To Play wrote, "Monster Burner may seem simple, but its use of a large touch screen and Internet connection will make you appreciate the device you're playing it on." 148Apps said, "Monster Burner is a fantastic mix of different game types ensuring that it will appeal to almost everyone. There's even a special mode, alongside the numerous other levels, aimed at children. It's a true must have for all iPad gamers."

Gamezebo called it "A blast. Literally. The gameplay is fun and challenging, the graphics and sound are totally charming, and the overall experience is utterly addictive. Pick this one up – you won't be sorry you did." AppSmile wrote, "An iPad-only release with picture book appeal and simple gameplay mechanics, Monster Burner provides both a casual experience and a fun high-scoring challenge." Pocket Gamer wrote, "Don't let the cuteness fool you: Monster Burner is a tough arcade puzzler."
