= Miniclip =

Swiss mobile game publisher

Miniclip SA
- Type: Subsidiary
- Industry: Video games
- Founded: 30 March 2001; 25 years ago
- Founder: Robert Small
- Headquarters: Neuchâtel, Switzerland
- Key people: Saad Choudri (CEO); Robert Small (president); Marius Manolache (COO); James Russell (CPO); Sérgio Varanda (CCO); Maryam Ziarati McLoughlin (GC); Stefan Beurier (CFO)
- Parent: Tencent (since 2015)
- Website: miniclip.com

Miniclip SA is a Swiss mobile game publisher and former browser game website first launched on 30 March 2001. It was founded by Robert Small and Tihan Presbie with a budget of £40,000. In 2008, the company was valued at over £275 million. Ten years later, Miniclip generated more than $400 million in revenue from its mobile game, 8 Ball Pool.

== History ==
As of July 2009, over 400 applications were hosted on its own website.

In February 2015, Tencent acquired majority stakes of Miniclip. In December 2016, Miniclip surpassed 1 billion downloads across its published mobile games on iOS-based, Android-based, and Windows Phone-based devices. In March 2022, Miniclip announced that it had reached 4 billion downloads worldwide with 8 Ball Pool alone accounting for 1 billion of them.

In April 2021, Miniclip celebrated its 21st anniversary. In response, the CEO of Miniclip claimed that it would be moving away from developing browser-based games to prioritize its mobile gaming products, including Agar.io, 8 Ball Pool, Mini Militia, Ludo Party and more.

In April 2022, Miniclip announced that it would begin prioritizing its mobile games. As a result, the browser game portal was shut down in July 2022 and the website lost all but two of its most popular games of the time, Agar.io and 8 Ball Pool.

In June 2022, Miniclip agreed to acquire SYBO, the co-publisher and co-developer of Subway Surfers, in an undisclosed deal. The deal with SYBO went through in July 2022.

In November 2024, Embracer Group announced that they would divest Easybrain to Miniclip for a consideration of $1.2 billion, with the transaction expected to close in early 2025.

== Studios ==
List of studios acquired by Miniclip (as of 7 November 2026)
| Name | Location | Acquired | Ref(s). |
|---|---|---|---|
| Masomo | İzmir, Turkey | 2019 | |
| Eight Pixels Square | Derby, United Kingdom | 2020 | |
| Gamebasics | Zoetermeer, Netherlands | 2021 | |
| Green Horse Games | Bucharest, Romania | 2021 | |
| Supersonic Software | Leamington Spa, United Kingdom | 2021 | |
| SYBO | Copenhagen, Denmark | 2022 | |
| Easybrain | Limassol, Cyprus | 2024 | |

== Mobile games ==
Miniclip has developed and published numerous mobile games for iOS, Android, Symbian, and Windows Phone. This includes 8 Ball Pool, Soccer Stars, Golf Battle, Gravity Guy, Bloons Tower Defense, On The Run, Plague Inc. for Android, Berry Rush, Agar.io, Diep.io, Mini Militia, Ludo Party and Head Ball 2.

== Other platforms ==
In September 2012, Microsoft announced on the Windows blog on 31 August 2012 (see also List of Xbox games on Windows) that Miniclip games would be able to distribute their games on the Xbox division of Windows 8. Miniclip games that are supported by Xbox for Windows 8 include Gravity Guy, iStunt 2, and Monster Island. Gravity Guy was released on Windows Store on 29 November 2010.

In April 2013, most Miniclip games for Windows 8 and Windows Phone were distributed for free for one year.

On 14 February 2017, Miniclip released their first mobile racer game which was compatible with Xbox One, PC, and PlayStation 4, titled MX Nitro.

== Malicious software issues ==
On 1 September 2005, the United States Computer Emergency Readiness Team issued an advisory concerning Miniclip:

The Retro64 / Miniclip CR64 Loader ActiveX control contains a buffer overflow vulnerability. This may allow a remote, unauthenticated attacker to execute an arbitrary code on a vulnerable system. Although the ActiveX control is no longer in use by either retro64.com or miniclip.com, any system that has used certain pages of these websites in the past (prior to September 2005) may be vulnerable.

In 2006, several security firms reported that some Miniclip users had installed a "miniclipgameloader.dll" which contained the hostile code identified as "Trojan Downloader 3069". In the same year, another download related to Miniclip installed "High Risk" malware called "Trojan-Downloader.CR64Loader".
