= Halfbrick Studios =

Australian video game developer

Halfbrick Studios Pty Ltd
- Type: Private
- Industry: Video games
- Founded: 2001; 25 years ago In Toowong, Australia
- Headquarters: Brisbane, Australia
- Number of locations: 3 (2019)
- Area served: Worldwide
- Key people: Shainiel Deo (CEO); Luke Muscat (COO)
- Products: Video games
- Number of employees: 100+ (2019)
- Website: halfbrick.com

Halfbrick Studios Pty Ltd is an Australian video game developer based in Brisbane. The company primarily worked on licensed games until 2008. The company is best known for Fruit Ninja (2010), Jetpack Joyride (2011), and Dan the Man (2015). They create games for Windows, Xbox, PlayStation, Windows Phone, Android and iOS. Outside of their Brisbane headquarters, Halfbrick also has offices in Sydney, Adelaide, Spain, Bulgaria, and Los Angeles.

== History ==
The company rose to prominence in 2010 with their game Fruit Ninja; by 2012, the game was on one third of all iPhones in the United States. By 2015, the game had been downloaded over 1 billion times.

In March 2012, Halfbrick Studios acquired Onan Games for an undisclosed price to make use of their software Mandreel, which allows games to support iOS, Android, Adobe Flash and HTML5 development.

In 2013, COO Luke Muscat held a Game Developers Conference talk about a physical game, Tank Turn Tactics, that was invented to be played internally by studio employees, but had to be banned due to its impact on workplace morale. The ability to gift "action points" to allies caused factions to form within the office, leading to betrayals that made employees refuse to work together. Tank Turn Tactics was also featured in a 2021 documentary by People Make Games.

In 2017, Halfbrick Studios was inducted into the QBLHOF. Halfbrick is one of Australia's fastest growing companies, and is among Australia's most notable cultural exports. In 2020, the company announced a "complete rebuild" of Fruit Ninja with a new engine and new graphics.

In 2023, Halfbrick Studios announced that they were switching from their free-to-play into a subscription model, by launching Halfbrick+. For a monthly fee, subscribers can play all the studio's games without ads or further in-app purchases.

== Games ==
Year	Title	Platform(s)
2002	Rocket Power: Beach Bandits	GameCube, PlayStation 2
2003	Fuzz & Rocket (cancelled)	Game Boy Advance
2004	Ty the Tasmanian Tiger 2: Bush Rescue	Game Boy Advance
2005	Ty the Tasmanian Tiger 3: Night of the Quinkan	Game Boy Advance
2006	Barnyard	Game Boy Advance
2006	Avatar: The Last Airbender	Game Boy Advance
2006	Nicktoons: Battle for Volcano Island	Game Boy Advance
2007	Heatseeker	PlayStation Portable
2007	Avatar: The Last Airbender – The Burning Earth	Game Boy Advance
2008	Hellboy: The Science of Evil	PlayStation Portable
2008	Avatar: The Last Airbender – Into the Inferno	Nintendo DS
2009	Marvel Super Hero Squad	Nintendo DS
2009	Halfbrick Blast Off	Xbox 360, PlayStation Portable, PlayStation 3
2009	Halfbrick Echoes	Xbox 360, PlayStation Portable, PlayStation 3, Zune HD
2009	Halfbrick Rocket Racing / Aero Racing	Xbox 360, PlayStation Portable, PlayStation 3
2010	Age of Zombies	iOS, Android, PlayStation Portable, PlayStation Vita, Ouya
2010	Fruit Ninja	iOS, Android, Bada, Windows Phone, Symbian
2010	Halfbrick Blast Off	iOS
2010	Sunset Studio: Behind the Scenes!	Microsoft Windows
2010	The Last Airbender	Nintendo DS
2010	Monster Dash	iOS, Android
2010	Raskulls	Xbox 360
2011	de Blob 2	Nintendo DS
2011	Fruit Ninja HD	Microsoft Windows
2011	Fruit Ninja FX	Arcade
2011	Fruit Ninja Kinect	Xbox 360
2011	Fruit Ninja Frenzy	Facebook
2011	Age of Zombies	iOS, Android
2011	Monster Dash	Google Chrome
2011	Jetpack Joyride	Android, iOS
2011	Fruit Ninja: Puss In Boots	Android, iOS
2011	Steambirds: Survival	Android, iOS
2011	Age of Zombies Anniversary	iOS
2012	Jetpack Joyride	Android, BlackBerry OS, Facebook, PlayStation Vita, Windows Runtime
2012	Fruit Ninja (Microsoft Store)	Windows Runtime
2013	Fish Out of Water	Android, iOS
2013	Fruit Ninja (Leap Motion)	Microsoft Windows
2013	Fruit Ninja Skittles	Android, iOS
2013	Band Stars	Android, iOS
2013	Colossatron: Massive World Threat	Android, iOS
2013	Shadows Remain	Android, iOS
2014	Bears vs. Art	Android, iOS
2014	Birzzle Fever	Android, iOS
2014	Yes Chef	Android, iOS
2014	Radical Rappelling	Android, iOS
2014	Top Farm	Android, iOS
2015	Fruit Ninja Kinect 2	Xbox One
2015	Fruit Ninja Academy: Math Master	Android, iOS
2016	Fruit Ninja VR	Microsoft Windows, PlayStation VR, Meta Quest, Meta Quest 2, Meta Quest Pro, Meta Quest 3
2016	Star Skater	Android, iOS
2016	Dan the Man	Android, iOS
2019	Magic Brick Wars	Android, iOS
2020	Battle Racing Stars	Android, iOS
2020	Wobble Drop	Android, iOS
2020	Fruit Ninja 2	Android, iOS
2022	Jetpack Joyride 2	iOS
2023	Fruit Ninja VR 2	Microsoft Windows, Meta Quest 2, Meta Quest Pro, Meta Quest 3
2023	Colossatron: Cosmic Crisis	iOS, Android
2023	Jumper's Quest	iOS, Android
2023	Brickle	iOS, Android
2023	Gibberish	iOS, Android
2024	The Thrill of the Fight 2	Meta Quest 2, Meta Quest Pro, Meta Quest 3
2025	Bluey's Quest for the Gold Pen	iOS, Android, PlayStation 4, PlayStation 5, Nintendo Switch, Nintendo Switch 2, Xbox Series X and Series S, Microsoft Windows
TBA	Dan the Man 2	iOS, Android
