= Fruit Ninja =

2010 video game

- Developer: Halfbrick Studios
- Publishers: Halfbrick; Storms (KaiOS)
- Designer: Luke Muscat
- Platforms: iOS; Android; Microsoft Windows; Personal Computer; Windows Phone; Symbian; Bada; Xbox 360; Facebook; PlayStation Vita; PlayStation 4; Xbox One; Oculus Quest; KaiOS; Nex Playground
- Release: April 20, 2010: iOS, iPod Touch Paid April 20, 2010 Android May 13, 2010 Microsoft Windows, Personal Computer May 20, 2010 iPad Paid July 9, 2010 iPhone, iPod Touch Lite August 1, 2010 iPad Lite August 6, 2010 Windows Phone December 22, 2010 Symbian OS March 2011 Bada OS March 29, 2011 Xbox 360 August 10, 2011 Windows 8 June 7, 2012 Nook Color June 10, 2011 PlayStation Vita August 13, 2013 Xbox One March 18, 2015 HTC Vive July 7, 2016 PlayStation 4 / PS VR December 20, 2016 Oculus Quest April 30, 2020 KaiOS August 26, 2021 Nex Playground December 2023
- Genre: Arcade
- Modes: Single-player, Multiplayer (iPad and Kinect for Xbox 360)

Fruit Ninja is a video game developed by Halfbrick Studios originally released on April 20, 2010. In the game, the player must slice fruit that is thrown into the air by swiping the device's touch screen with their finger(s) or (in the case of the Kinect and Nex Playground version) the player's arms and hands, and must not slice bombs. It features multiple gameplay modes, leaderboards and multiplayer.

The game was initially released for iPod Touch and iPhone devices before being expanded to other devices and platforms: It was ported to Android devices on May 13, 2010, and to Microsoft Windows on May 20, 2010. July 9, 2010, for iPad devices, December 22, 2010, for Windows Phone, and March 2011 for Samsung's Bada and Nokia's Symbian. Fruit Ninja Kinect, which utilizes the Kinect peripheral, was released for the Xbox 360 on August 10, 2011.

Fruit Ninja was also released for Windows 8, on June 7, 2012. Versions with alternative names exist, such as Fruit Ninja HD on the iPad; also released on Intel AppUp in 2011 for Windows, Fruit Ninja THD for Nvidia Tegra 2–based Android devices, Fruit Ninja VR for HTC Vive and PlayStation 4, and an arcade version called Fruit Ninja FX with a sequel Fruit Ninja FX 2 following in November 2012. A version using the Leap Motion was released in 2013 for Microsoft Windows. A second Kinect version titled Fruit Ninja Kinect 2 was released in 2015 for Xbox One. A mobile version using the keypad was released in 2021 for KaiOS devices. The game is included in the Nex Playground console, which was released in 2023.

The game was well received by critics and is widely considered to be one of the best mobile games ever made; In August 2013, Fruit Ninja reached 700 million downloads. In 2015, the app reached 1 billion downloads. Reviewers felt that the low cost of the game combined with addictive gameplay yielded an excellent value. They further lauded the post-launch support provided by Halfbrick, which brought online multiplayer, achievements, and leaderboards to the game.

== Gameplay ==
Fruit Ninja is played by using a touchpad to slice on-screen fruit. Additional points are awarded for slicing multiple fruits in one swipe.

In Fruit Ninja, the player slices fruit with a blade controlled via the touch screen (Unless they are on the Xbox 360 edition). As the fruit is thrown onto the screen, the player swipes their finger across the screen to create a slicing motion, attempting to slice the fruit in half. Extra points are awarded for slicing multiple fruits with one swipe (called "combo"s), and players can use additional fingers to make multiple slices simultaneously. Players must slice all fruit; if three cumulative fruits are missed, the game ends, but upon reaching scores that are multiples of one hundred and the players have lost at least a life, the player will gain an extra life. Bombs are occasionally thrown onto the screen, and will also end the game should the player slice them.

=== Modes ===
==== Zen Mode ====
A mode known as "Zen" allows players to seek high scores without the hindrance of bombs appearing on the screen, but players only have a minute and thirty seconds.

==== Arcade Mode ====
Arcade Mode is similar to Zen Mode, except bombs only deduct 10 points from the player's score instead of losing, and three frequently appearing special bananas, consisting "Frenzy", "Score x2" and "Freeze", which have unique bonus power-ups, such as doubling points scored for a limited time ("Score x2"), throwing more fruit from the game screen's sides without risk of bombs ("Frenzy"), and/or freezing the time for a few seconds ("Freeze").

==== Classic ====
In Classic, special pomegranates are occasionally thrown on-screen. In Arcade, it is guaranteed that at the end of each game, a pomegranate will appear. Players can slice one multiple times; all slices credit points as a multi-hit target. Similarly, an ultra-rare dragonfruit sometimes appears in Classic mode which, if sliced, awards players fifty points.

When Fruit Ninja celebrated its second anniversary, Halfbrick released an update with a new feature called Gutsu's Cart, which comprises two characters, a pig named Truffles and a merchant named Gutsu. In the various modes of the game, the player can earn starfruit to purchase items in Gutsu's Cart. There are three purchasable items at the cart which are used in the game; Berry Blast causes sliced strawberries to explode and gives the player five extra points. Another item is Peachy Times: slicing a peach in Zen or Arcade mode gives the player two extra seconds. The third item is Bomb Deflects which saves the player accidentally slicing up to 3 bombs. Starfruit can be obtained after each game, proportional to the score, or by slicing the semi-rare starfruit.

In the fifth anniversary update to Fruit Ninja, Gutsu's Cart was removed and instead replaced with a power-up menu that used starfruit to buy the three power-ups in the game. Berry Blast power-ups were priced at 120 starfruit each, Peachy Times power-ups were priced at 100 starfruit, and Bomb Deflect power-ups were priced at 80 starfruit. In addition, certain dojos and blades now had different effects that took place within the Classic, Arcade, and Zen game modes. For example, if a player owned the Cherry Blossom dojo, the power-up costs were 50% off. A new festival mode was added in as well, where players could compete against the game's artificial intelligence by paying Gold Apples for each challenge. There were also mini-games added to challenge the skills of newcomers and experts alike.

Multiplayer gameplay is supported on iOS devices through Apple's Game Center application. It allows for competitive gameplay and features leaderboards and achievements. During multiplayer matches, the player's blade and fruit are highlighted in blue, while the opponent's are highlighted in red. White outlined fruit are considered neutral and may be claimed by either player. White outlined fruit are worth three points. Players must slice their own fruit while avoiding their opponent's fruit. The iPad version of the game features enhanced graphics and also supports local multiplayer, with the screen being divided in half and each player controlling half of the screen. Players can also share high scores via OpenFeint, Twitter and Facebook.

== Development and marketing ==
In an interview with GameSpot, Phil Larsen, Chief Marketing Officer at Halfbrick discussed the development of Fruit Ninja. He stated, "We tried a lot of different channels [...] indie games, PSN, XBLA, [...] and we basically did a lot of research about what was happening on iPhone and made a game that worked out pretty well." He then spoke of the company's brainstorming process for new games and said "Fruit Ninja came as part of [that] process, but we identified it as something special [and] decided to fast-track it through." Luke Muscat, Lead Designer for Fruit Ninja stated that he felt the uniqueness of the touch screen platforms and the short development cycle further motivated Halfbrick to develop the game.

The game was first released on April 20, 2010, for iPod Touch and iOS devices. It was later was ported to Android devices on May 13, 2010 and to Microsoft Windows computers the following week. On July 9, 2010, Fruit Ninja HD was released for the iPad devices. On the same day, an Arcade mode was announced for Fruit Ninja which adjusted gameplay dynamics. It was released two days later on November 4, 2010. In December 2010, Lite versions of Fruit Ninja and Fruit Ninja HD were released for iOS devices and serve as demo versions of the game. The game was also released for Windows Phone 7 on December 22, 2010. Phil Larsen stated that due to the quick-release nature of iOS applications that a different marketing strategy is required. "You could have a game rise to the top and fall off in three days. You want to get it up there at the right time and have the right backup plan to sustain it with updates and further press" he said. On January 21, 2011, an update was released for the Android version of the game which added Arcade mode, leaderboards, and an ice blade to the game. A Windows port of the game was launched in June 2011. A spin-off edition of the game titled Fruit Ninja: Puss in Boots, themed to the DreamWorks animated film, Puss in Boots was released on various devices. In March 2011, Halfbrick announced a Facebook port of the game entitled Fruit Ninja Frenzy. The free-to-play game port was published as a beta in April 2011, and Halfbrick described it as "60 second gameplay with many powerups, unlockables and achievements". The Facebook version received several updates and was available from November 18, 2012 until the game underwent sunset closure on November 30, 2013. In mid-2011, an amusement arcade version appeared titled Fruit Ninja FX.

On August 10, 2011, Fruit Ninja Kinect was released for the Xbox 360 console as a downloadable game from the Xbox Live Marketplace. It was the first XBLA game to make use of the motion-sensing Kinect controller. On screen, the fruit-slicing concept is enhanced by the Kinect to include the player's entire self; the camera places a shadowy silhouette of the player's body upon a background scene, and arm and hand movements are visualized as blade-slashing arcs to slice fruit. To promote the Xbox 360 game, a voucher token for Fruit Ninja Kinect was included in the retail box of The Gunstringer, a separate Kinect title developed by Twisted Pixel Games. Fruit Ninja Kinect received its first additional downloadable content (DLC) on August 24, 2011. Entitled 'Storm Season', the add-on DLC provided three new Xbox Live achievements and a new visual theme for the game. Subsequent DLCs for the popular Kinect version included 'Space Capsule', 'Art Box', 'Christmas Present' (free), '8-bit Cartridge', 'Trick or Treat Bag', 'Flower Power', and 'High-Tech Vault'. In 2012, Fruit Ninja Kinect won "Casual Game of the Year" from the 15th Annual Interactive Achievement Awards, and it continues to be ranked in the Top 10 best-selling XBLA games of all time.

In March 2012, HalfBrick announced a partnership with BlueStacks to make Fruit Ninja's Android App available for Windows worldwide. The program received over a million downloads in its first 10 days. On March 18, 2015, Fruit Ninja Kinect 2 was released by Halfbrick for the Xbox One. Hibernum Créations is the game developer. As well as retaining all the content of the original Kinect game, the FNK2 version provides new game features such as Ninja Dodge, Strawberry Strike, Bamboo Strike, and Apple Range. Party Mode and Battle Mode allow up to four players to join in multiplayer battle. On July 7, 2016, Fruit Ninja VR was released for the HTC Vive on Steam Early Access. Fruit Ninja received a direct sequel in 2020. On April 7, 2023, Fruit Ninja VR 2 was released on Steam and the Meta Quest store.

On August 26, 2021, Halfbrick and Singapore-based gaming startup Storms released a version of Fruit Ninja and Jetpack Joyride for KaiOS devices. The KaiOS version of Fruit Ninja uses the keypad to slice fruit.

In December of 2023, the Nex Playground console was released with Fruit Ninja pre-installed. The player must use their arms and hands to swipe the fruits, similar to the Kinect version.

=== Reception ===
Reception

Aggregate scores
Aggregator	Score
GameRankings	iOS: 87%
Metacritic	iOS: 75/100 (HD) iOS: 80/100 (Kinect) X360: 71/100 (Kinect 2) XONE: 69/100

Review scores
Publication	Score
GameZone	7/10
IGN	8.5/10
AppSpy	5/5
Gamezebo	4/5
Slide to Play	4/4
TouchArcade	iOS: 5/5
Android Games	4/5

Fruit Ninja was well received by critics. The game has an average score of 75 out of 100 based on 12 reviews on Metacritic, indicating "generally favorable reviews", and 87% based on 5 reviews on GameRankings. It was also named one of Time magazine's 50 Best iPhone Apps of 2011.

Reviewers were mostly unified in the overall fun factor in the game. Levi Buchanan of IGN stated that the game was "fun, fun, fun" and "an instantly pleasurable experience". Slide to Play's Chris Reed agreed and felt that the game was perfect for when a consumer has short moments of boredom. He likened this to playing the game while waiting in line for something and stated "it'll slice the time in half." Jim Squires of GameZebo felt the gameplay was simple and addictive. Geoff Gibson of DIYGamer stated that he could see Fruit Ninja "becoming the next "big thing" on the App Store." Several reviewers praised price and Halfbrick's commitment to continual updates to the game. GameZone's James Pikover stated "perhaps the best part is that this game isn't even complete." He then spoke of the future game modes to be made available and lauded the value-to-price ratio. App Spy's Andrew Nesvadba agreed that Halfbrick's commitment and updates were "nothing short of spectacular." He also praised the game's graphics and said they were "luscious". The reviewer from BuzzFocus praised the game's inexpensive price and said consumers "should really be downloading this app right now."

The game's scoring system and difficulty were received to mixed commentary. Chris Reed of Slide to Play felt that there should have been an option to increase the game's difficulty curve. Andrew Nesvadba of App Spy felt that was difficult to beat a high score since the bonus items were random. DIYGamer's Geoff Gibson also shared this sentiment. James Pikover of GameZone, Geoff Gibson of DIYGamer and Levi Buchanan of IGN all praised the game's ability to boast scores to friends and family via Facebook and Twitter.

During the 15th Annual Interactive Achievement Awards, the Academy of Interactive Arts & Sciences awarded the Kinect version of Fruit Ninja with "Casual Game of the Year".

=== Sales ===
The iOS version of Fruit Ninja sold over 200,000 copies in its first month. In its third month over one million units had been sold. It passed two million units sold in September 2010, with the total reaching four million in December 2010. By March 2011, total downloads across all platforms exceeded 20 million. In May 2012, it reached 300 million downloads, and was on one third of all US iPhones. In 2015, the app reached 1 billion downloads. The Windows Phone 7 version was the top application downloaded the week of December 28, 2010. The Xbox Live Arcade version moved over 739,000 units in its first calendar year.

The iPad version of Fruit Ninja has been used to help rehabilitate stroke patients.

== Related media ==
A live-action family comedy film version of the app was being adapted by Halfbrick Studios, with Tripp Vinson and his banner Vinson Films set to produce the film. J.P. Lavin and Chad Damiani were writing the script for the film with New Line Cinema. However, it was ultimately rejected.

A YouTube Premium exclusive series titled Fruit Ninja: Frenzy Force was announced. The CGI animated series, produced by Halfbrick Studios, follows the adventures of Seb, Niya, Peng and Ralph as they are trained to become the fruit ninja who must do battle with the ancient Durian Grey and his monsters. The series would later be cancelled, ending only in 13 episodes.

== See also ==
- List of most-downloaded Google Play applications
