= Michael Alldredge =

American film and television actor (1941–1997)

- Born: Dennis Michael Alldredge; April 13, 1941; Bakersfield, California, U.S.
- Died: December 19, 1997 (aged 56); Los Angeles, California, U.S.
- Resting place: Oak Park Cemetery in Claremont, California, U.S.
- Occupation: Actor

Dennis Michael Alldredge (April 13, 1941 – December 19, 1997) was an American film and television actor. He played Frank Foley in the short-lived drama television series Almost Grown. He also played Bill Graham in the miniseries V and Tony Montana's lawyer George Sheffield in the 1983 film Scarface.

Alldredge guest-starred in numerous television programs, including ER, The Bob Newhart Show, Quantum Leap, One Day at a Time, Three's Company, The Dukes of Hazzard, Punky Brewster, Who's the Boss? and All in the Family. He also appeared on two segments of the 1985 anthology television series The Twilight Zone.

Alldredge died of lung cancer on December 19, 1997, in Los Angeles, California, at the age of 56.

== Filmography ==
=== Film ===
Year	Title	Role	Notes
1977	Ruby	Sheriff's Wife's Date	
1977	The Incredible Melting Man	Sheriff Neil Blake	
1981	Choices	Tony	
1982	Shoot the Moon	Officer Knudson	
1982	The Entity	George Nash	
1983	The Sting II	'Big Ohio'	
1983	Scarface	George Sheffield, Tony's Lawyer	
1986	Iron Eagle	Colonel Blackbum	
1986	About Last Night	Mother Malone	
1988	Johnny Be Good	Vinny Kroll	
1988	Ghost Town	Bubba	
1989	Robot Jox	'Tex' Conway	
1990	Almost an Angel	Sergeant Freebody	
1991	The Taking of Beverly Hills	Dispatch Sergeant	

=== Television ===
Year	Title	Role	Notes
1976	All in the Family	Policeman	Episode: "The Unemployment Story: Part 2"
1976	Charlie's Angels	Adams	Episode: "To Kill an Angel"
1976	Serpico	Waller	Episode: "Danger Zone"
1976–1977	Mary Hartman, Mary Hartman	Waiter / The Jailer	3 episodes
1976–1979	The Rockford Files	Cab Driver / Dobson	2 episodes
1977	Police Story	Virg Provost	Episode: "Spitfire"
1977	Most Wanted	Manager	Episode: "Ms. Murder"
1977	The Jeffersons	Man #1	2 episodes
1977	Operation Petticoat	Murphy	Episode: "Operation Petticoat"
1977	Kojak	Katkoff	Episode: "A Strange Kind of Love"
1977	Visions	Lawrence Murphy	Episode: "The Dancing Bear"
1977	Sunshine Christmas	Ray Griff	TV movie
1978	One Day at a Time	Detective	Episode: "Barbara's Rebellion"
1978	The Bob Newhart Show	Burt Harrison	Episode: "Emily Carlin, Emily Carlin"
1978	The Two-Five	1st Two-Five Officer	TV movie
1978	The Bastard	British Sergeant	
1978	Just Me and You	Max	TV movie
1978	James at 15	Unknown	Episode: "Ducks"
1978	Rhoda	Ed Riley	Episode: "The Total Brenda"
1978	Long Journey Back	Dave Lewis	TV movie
1978–1979	Barnaby Jones	Deputy Sheriff Gordon / Joe Tucker	2 episodes
1978–1981	Lou Grant	Worker #2 / Sergeant Roche / Ted McPhee	6 episodes
1978–1985	Alice	Bus Driver / Frank / Ralph	9 episodes
1979	Roots: The Next Generations	Mr. Davidson	Episode: "Part III (1914-1918)"
1979	Hart to Hart	Lieutenant Harry Moss	2 episodes
1979	The Incredible Hulk	Sergeant Sam Stanley	Episode: "Blind Rage"
1979	A Man Called Sloane	Church	Episode: "Collision Course"
1979–1984	The Dukes of Hazzard	Wheeler / Billy Joe Coogan	2 episodes
1980	B.J. and the Bear	Calhoun	Episode: "Bear Bondage"
1980	Archie Bunker's Place	Briggs	Episode: "A Small Mafia Favor"
1980	Quincy, M.E.	Charlie Ransler	Episode: "Deadly Arena"
1980	Here's Boomer	Kranick	Episode: "Jailbreak"
1980	Sanford	Detective #1	Episode: "Retrospective: Part 1"
1980	Palmerstown, U.S.A.	Jim Brandon	Episode: "Kidnapped"
1980	Nightside	Tellinger	TV movie
1981	Thornwell	Beecham	TV movie
1980–1991	Dallas	Ray King / Police Detective Don Horton / Steve Jackson	9 episodes
1981	Fantasy Island	Tom	Episode: "Hard Knocks/Lady Godiva"
1981	Fly Away Home	Jed	TV movie
1981	Private Benjamin	Sergeant Connors	Episode: "Give Me Liberty: Part 2"
1981	The Greatest American Hero	Vern	Episode: "Don't Mess Around with Jim"
1982	The Gift of Life	Carl	TV movie
1982	Seven Brides for Seven Brothers	Wheeler	Episode: "Pilot"
1982	Three's Company	Sam	Episode: "Diamond Jack"
1982	Joanie Loves Chachi	McNutty	Episode: "Goodbye Delvecchio's, Hello World"
1983	Another Woman's Child	Robert Martin	TV movie
1983	Knight Rider	Bob Kroiger	Episode: "The Topaz Connection"
1983	Taxi	Todd	Episode: "Sugar Ray Nardo"
1983	V	Bill Graham	2 episodes
1983	I Want to Live!	Mr. Cooley	TV movie
1983	Scarecrow and Mrs. King	Coach Leopold	Episode: "Sudden Death"
1983–1984	The A-Team	Whitaker / Don / Colonel Twill	3 episodes
1984	Blue Thunder	Hal Winters	Episode: "A Clear and Present Danger"
1984	Cover Up	Unknown	Episode: "Writer's Block"
1984–1985	Hill Street Blues	Brandon / Edsel	2 episodes
1985	The Atlanta Child Murders	Bobby Tolin	2 episodes
1985	Matt Houston	The Bartender	Episode: "Killing Time"
1985	Family Ties	Young Jake Keaton	Episode: "Remembrances of Things Past"
1985	Cagney & Lacey	Howard Tanner	Episode: "The Psychic"
1985	Hostage Flight	Bradigan	TV movie
1986	Punky Brewster	Mr. Matzie	Episode: "Girls Will Be Boys"
1986	The Paper Chase	Unknown	Episode: "Mistaken Identity"
1986	Promise	Gibb	TV movie
1987	The Last Fling	Larry Fields	TV movie
1986–1987	The Twilight Zone	Mike Mulvaney / Schimdt	2 episodes
1987	The Magical World of Disney	Yardbull	Episode: "Young Harry Houdini"
1987	Webster	Nick Papadapolis	Episode: "Hello, Nicky"
1987	Beauty and the Beast	Nat	Episode: "Beast Within"
1988	Who's the Boss?	Joe	Episode: "Sleep Talk, Sweet Talk"
1988–1989	Almost Grown	Frank Foley	13 episodes
1989	Hard Time on Planet Earth	Buck McGrew	Episode: "Rodeo Show"
1989	Night Walk	Brody	TV movie
1989	Booker	Officer Ray Dewey	Episode: "The Pump"
1989	Quantum Leap	Charlie Samuels	Episode: "Jimmy - October 14, 1964"
1990	Columbo	Connolly	Episode: "Rest in Peace, Mrs. Columbo"
1991	Life Goes On	Mr. Seedling	3 episodes
1992	Murder, She Wrote	Jason MacNamara	Episode: "Jason MacNamara"
1993	Reasonable Doubts	O'Connor	Episode: "Thank God, It's Friday"
1995	My Brother's Keeper	Karbs	TV movie
1996	ER	Ray's Dad	Episode: "It's Not Easy Being Greene"
1996	Mary & Tim	Steve Michaels	TV movie
1997	JAG	Gunnery Sergeant Krycek	Episode: "Force Recon", (final appearance)
