= List of Scarface characters =

This is a list of characters who appeared in the original film Scarface (1932), and its remake Scarface (1983), as well as the pseudo-sequel video game to the latter film, Scarface: The World Is Yours (2006).

== 1932 film ==
=== Tony Camonte ===
Antonio "Tony" Camonte is main character in Scarface and the novel of the same name, written by Armitage Trail, where the character is named Tony Guarino. Portrayed by Paul Muni, Tony is loosely inspired by on Prohibition-era gangster Al Capone. In the novel and film, Tony is running the alcohol trade during the prohibition and is gunned down by his older brother who thought Tony died in World War 1.

== 1983 film and The World Is Yours ==
=== Tony Montana ===
Antonio "Tony" Montana is the main character in Scarface and the video game Scarface: The World Is Yours, portrayed by Al Pacino in the film and voiced by André Sogliuzzo in the video game. Oliver Stone came up with the name by combining the last name of his then-favourite football player (Joe Montana) and the first name from the main character of the 1932 film version, Tony Camonte, played by Paul Muni.

In the film's ending Tony Montana's mansion was raided by Alex Sosa's (Alejandro Sosa's) gang in retribution for not killing a Bolivian anti-drug journalist with his wife and children, resulting in his death, but in the video game Tony Montana could survive the assault, regain his criminal empire, and exact revenge on Sosa.

=== Alejandro Sosa ===
Alejandro "Alex" Sosa is a Bolivian drug lord. Sosa is the head of a very powerful drug cartel in Bolivia. He has vast connections in both the Bolivian government and the United States government, allowing him to operate with total impunity. He and Tony start off as friends, but in the end become enemies. He was portrayed by Paul Shenar in the film. He is based on the Bolivian drug trafficker Roberto Suárez Gómez.

In the video game Sosa services as Tony's chief nemesis. He has taken over Tony's territory in Miami and divided it up between Nacho Contreras, The Diaz Brothers and Gaspar Gomez. He was voiced by Robert Davi.

=== Manny Ribera ===
Manolo Ribera nicknamed "Manny Ray", is best friends with Tony Montana who rises with him to the top of the cocaine business in Miami during the early 1980s. Manny is Tony‘s friend from the neighborhood and of the many Cubans to arrive to America via the Mariel Boatlift, along with Tony, Angel Fernandez and Chi-Chi. After assisting Tony with the murder of an enemy of Frank Lopez, they are granted green cards, and thus are released from their refugee camp. The four friends began their new life of crime under Lopez's criminal empire. Along the way Angel is killed during a drug deal gone-bad; Manny arrives late but manages to save Tony's life in the same incident. Despite being promoted to head of security, Manny is distracted by a woman every time he is needed, resulting in Tony getting shot at the club and the compound being overwhelmed by Sosa's hit squad. Eventually, Manny falls in love with Tony's sister, but the latter harshly warns him to stay away from her. Tony later finds the two together and shoots and kills Manny in a fit of rage, not knowing that he had recently married Gina. He is portrayed by Steven Bauer.

=== Frank Lopez ===
Frank Lopez is an aging Miami-based drug lord (leading the Lopez Cartel), who asks Tony Montana and Manny Ribera to kill a former political aide to Fidel Castro. Initially, Frank and Tony get along well until Tony makes a unapproved deal with Alejandro Sosa, allows for Omar Suárez’s demise, and falls in love with his girlfriend, Elvira Hancock, ending their partnership. As a result, Frank arranges for Tony to be assassinated. The attempt backfires and Lopez is killed by Manny on Tony's orders. He was portrayed by Robert Loggia.

=== "Chi-Chi" ===
"Chi-Chi" is one of Tony's best friends and henchmen as he rises to power. He helped save Tony at the botched drug deal with the Colombians. Chi-Chi was with Tony at the money laundering bust. He was shot to death by one of Sosa's hitmen. He was portrayed by Ángel Salazar.

=== Hector "The Toad" ===
Hector, nicknamed "The Toad", is a Colombian cocaine dealer and presumably an associate of Omar Suarez, who with his three Colombian gang members planned to rip-off Tony, and kills Tony's friend Angel Fernandez with a chainsaw. Tony in turn shoots him in the head. He was portrayed by Al Israel.

=== Marta ===
Marta is a Colombian cocaine dealer. She is the bodyguard and assumed girlfriend of Hector "The Toad". She along with Hector and two more Colombians killed held Tony and Angel at gunpoint before the later was killed by Hector. Unlike Hector, she does not speak English and only understands Spanish. Together, the four of them planned on killing Tony and his gang, keeping the cocaine and stealing Frank Lopez's money. Marta was gunned down by Manny. She was portrayed by Barbra Perez.

=== Emilio Rebenga ===
Emilio Rebenga was once one of the most trusted members of Fidel Castro's inner circle. During the Cuban Revolution Rebenga tortured several anti-communists to death. One of his victims was the brother of Frank Lopez. At some point after the revolution Castro doubted Rebenga's loyalty, so Castro ordered him to be locked up behind bars. After the Mariel Boatlift, Rebenga along, with thousands of Cuban immigrants half of which were Cuba's most violent and deadly criminals, were released on the shores of America. Unable to enter the United States by the usual channels Rebenga is sent to the Freedom Town Detention Center. Frank Lopez soon finds out Rebenga is in the country and orders Omar Suarez to put an open contract out on Rebenga's life. Omar reaches out to the criminals in Freedom Town and promises whoever carries out the hit on Rebenga will be released from the detention center and will also receive green cards. He is therefore stabbed to death by Montana. He was portrayed by Roberto Contreras.

=== Gaspar Gomez ===
Gaspar Gomez is a Mexican drug kingpin partnering with Alejandro Sosa. Gomez appears in the video game Scarface: The World Is Yours, but is murdered at the end of the game by Montana along with George Sheffield and Sosa. He was portrayed by Robert Vandenberg in the film, and voiced by Cheech Marin in the video game. Gomez was only mentioned by name in the film.

=== The Diaz Brothers ===
Alfonso Diaz and Edgar Diaz, known as The Diaz Brothers, are only mentioned in the film but never seen. Many fans mistake the two assassins that Frank sends to kill Tony as the Diaz brothers, but it is made clear numerous times that not only is this not the case, but that the Diaz brothers in fact run a rival cartel to the Lopez cartel. When Tony informs Frank of the deal he made with Sosa, Frank asks Tony what the Diaz Brothers, along with Echevierra and Gaspar Gomez, will do when the Lopez cartel starts moving that volume of product. Tony then goes into a profane tirade on his opinion of Gaspar Gomez, the Diaz Brothers and everyone else. After the assassination attempt on Tony, Frank tries to pin blame on the Diaz Brothers, stating he will get revenge on them for Tony. After taking over the Lopez Cartel, Tony and Manny discuss security and fears the Diaz brothers may be plotting against him.

In the video game, after Tony survives Sosa's raid on his island mansion, he seeks revenge on him and also begins trying to get his old businesses back from Gaspar Gomez, Nacho "El Gordo" Contreras, Edgar, and Alfonso themselves. The brothers kill Tony's mother, and send assassins after him in the Babylon Club. Tony kills all but one who reveals the Diaz's had the older lady. In revenge, Tony stages an attack on the Diaz car dealership. Edgar is slain in the back halls of the building. Alfonso is killed in a car chase. Alfonso Diaz was voiced by Steve Wilcox. Edgar Diaz was voiced by Art Bonilla.

=== Nacho Contreras ===
Ignacio Contreras, nicknamed "Nacho" or "El Gordo", is a large drug baron in charge of cocaine distribution in Downtown. In the film, Frank Lopez points him out in the Babylon Club to Tony Montana and says he's a real "chazzer", which is a Yiddish word meaning pig. Besides being extremely obese, the insulting term refers to Nacho's greed, which means that "he don't fly straight no more". In the movie he is depicted as the richest man in Miami. He was portrayed by Joe Marmo.

In the video game, Nacho Contreras is killed, while attempting to escape Tony by swimming to a boat, but he is shot causing him to bleed and attract a great white shark to attack him. He was voiced by Miguel Sandoval.

=== The Echevierra Brothers ===
Luis and Miguel Echevierra, known as The Echevierra Brothers, are drug dealers who run the biggest distribution network of cocaine in Miami, Houston and Tucson.

=== Gina Montana-Ribera ===
Gina Montana-Ribera is Tony Montana's younger sister as well as Georgina Montana's daughter. She attends community college and works part-time at a beauty salon. Throughout the film, Tony is shown to be extremely protective of Gina to the point that he assaults one of her boyfriends. Because of this, she could never do anything she wanted because Tony would not allow it. As Tony rose up in the ranks, Gina began to do drugs. Gina eventually secretly married Manny hoping that the two would surprise Tony. However, when Tony sees them together, he shoots and kills Manny in a fit of rage before having Gina brought back to his mansion. Just as the mansion was about to be assaulted by Sosa's men, Gina then appears in Tony's office. Mad with grief, she accuses Tony of turning any man away from her because he secretly wanted her. She shoots at Tony and manages to hit him in the leg. Before she can kill her brother, one of Sosa's men appears from the balcony and guns her down, killing her instantly. She was portrayed by Mary Elizabeth Mastrantonio.

In the game, Tony often calls out to Gina that he hopes she is in Heaven, and he can also purchase her cremated remains in an urn, along with the remains of her husband Manny.

=== Georgina Montana ===
Georgina "Mama" Montana is Tony and Gina's mother. After Tony went to prison she took Gina and left Cuba for Miami. Since then she has all but disowned her son, seeing him as a bad influence on Gina and disapproves of his criminal lifestyle. When Tony visits Mama and Gina after his five year imprisonment, he offered them money so that they would never have to work again. However, Mama questions Tony’s motives for the money, then berates him for being a criminal. She also tells Tony she is content working for her own money and kicks him out. Sometime later, Mama requests Tony find Gina and lashes out at Tony for corrupting Gina, calling him ungrateful and a bad son. She was portrayed by Míriam Colón.

In the game a hitman reveals to Tony that she is murdered on the orders of The Diaz Brothers.

=== Mel Bernstein ===
Mel Bernstein is a corrupt cop and the Detective of the Miami Police Department Narcotics Bureau. He meets Tony at the Babylon Club offers him two choices: pay him a large undisclosed amount of money every month in exchange for coming under the protection of Bernstein's task force, or go to jail for his past crimes, which Tony reluctantly agrees. Later, Bernstein was in a meeting with Frank Lopez after orchestrating Tony's assassination. After Lopez is dead, Bernstein remains nonchalant and tells Tony that he tried to talk Lopez out of the hit. Tony, realizing that killing him would be of no consequence, shoots him in the stomach before finally ending his life after Bernstein curses him. He was portrayed by Harris Yulin.

=== Angel Fernandez ===
Angel Fernandez is one of Tony's closest friends, besides Chi-Chi and Manny. Angel had been close with them since before the Mariel Boatlift. They had all served in the Cuban army together. He had helped Tony and Manny kill Emilio Rebenga. He was dismembered by a chainsaw wheeled by Colombian drug dealer Hector "The Toad" and was killed. He was portrayed by Pepe Serna.

=== Nick "The Pig" ===
Nick nicknamed "The Pig", is one of Tony's underlings and a well-connected drug dealer of prescription pills, including amphetamines and sedatives. Despite the fact that Tony doesn't treat him that well (in fact he openly insults him on a regular basis) and nicknames him "the pig" because of his obesity, Nick stayed loyal to Tony and stood his ground during the final assault on the mansion. He was also Elvira's best friend. He was portrayed by Michael P. Moran.

=== Omar Suárez ===
Omar Suárez is Frank Lopez's right hand man. Omar had ordered Montana and Ribera to kill Emilio Rebenga while at the detention center. After succeeding, Tony and Manny were both offered green cards and jobs in Miami. Tony and Omar develop a strong dislike for each other. Alberto “The Shadow” claimed to have recognized Omar from back when Suarez was an informant in New York who sent Vito Duval, Nello Ramos and Gino Ramos to prison for life. The film leaves it vague whether this was true or if Sosa just wanted him out of the way of the deal. Omar is hung and killed from a helicopter by The Skull on Alejandro Sosa’s orders. He was portrayed by F. Murray Abraham.

=== Waldo Rojas ===
Waldo Rojas is a member of Frank Lopez's Cartel. He was the one who suggested to Omar to let Tony and Manny buy the cocaine from Hector "The Toad" and his gang of Colombians. Thinking if something goes wrong Tony and Manny would be killed. He was portrayed by Santos Morales.

=== Elvira Hancock ===
Elvira Hancock is introduced as Frank Lopez's wife who later becomes Tony Montana's wife. Tony nicknames her "Elvie". Elvira Hancock came from Baltimore, Maryland. Elvira was portrayed by Michelle Pfeiffer.

=== "The Skull" ===
"The Skull" is one of Sosa's professional sicario's and chief assassin. The Skull hangs Omar Suárez from a helicopter and later murders Tony by shooting him in the spine with a single shot from his 12-gauge Zabala shotgun. He was portrayed by Mexican-American actor Geno Silva.

In Scarface: The World Is Yours, the Skull attempts to assassinate Tony at the beginning of the game's story, but Tony escapes after turning around and killing the assassin.

=== Alberto "The Shadow" ===
Alberto nicknamed "The Shadow", is another of Sosa's professional henchmen. While Tony and Omar argued during a business luncheon with Sosa, Alberto recognized Suárez from New York City and informed Sosa. Years earlier, Suárez was an informant who caused the lifetime imprisonment of Vito Duval along with Nello and Gino Ramos. In retribution and on Sosa’s orders, Alberto and fellow henchman “The Skull” hung and killed Suárez from a helicopter. Later on Alberto was ordered by Sosa to go with Tony to New York City. They were to bomb Matos Gutierrez’ car in front of the U.N. Building. Gutierrez found information damning to Sosa's organization. However, Gutierrez unexpectedly decided to bring along his wife and children. Tony, unwilling to murder a woman and two children, refuses to carry the hit out unless Gutierrez is killed alone. Alberto, insistent on killing Gutierrez regardless of his company, is shot and killed by Tony before he can trigger the explosion. He was portrayed by Mark Margolis.

=== George Sheffield ===
George Sheffield is Tony's lawyer when he gets arrested by undercover police for laundering money. In a deleted scene, Sheffield is shown being bribed, explaining how he became Tony's lawyer. He was portrayed by Michael Alldredge.

In the game, after Tony Montana survives the raid on his island mansion, he tracks Sheffield to the Babylon Club. In the middle of the game, Sheffield is possibly bribed by Sosa and betrays Montana. He is murdered by Montana. He was voiced by James Woods.

=== "The Sandman" ===
"The Sandman" (real name unknown) is an Afro-Latin American drug dealer working in The Islands. In some missions throughout the video game, Montana will have to protect this character. The Sandman also runs his own drug cartel that rivals Sosa's, and allies his cartel with Tony's, as Sosa is also at war with the Sandman as he is with Tony. He was voiced by Steven Bauer, who played Manny Ribera in the film.

=== Ernie ===
Ernie worked security and as a bodyguard for Frank Lopez; after Manny and Tony killed Frank and Mel, instead of also being killed Tony spares him and offers him a similar job. Working for Tony proves to be a similar experience as working for Frank, though a bit more work because Tony gets drunk and disorderly at restaurants and Ernie has to clean it up. Ernie was strangled to death by one of Sosa's hitmen. In the movie, Ernie was played by Texan actor Arnaldo Santana.

=== Fernando ===
Fernando worked for a drug dealer named Luco. He dated Tony's sister Gina until Tony caught them together at the Babylon Club. Tony is furious when he sees them in the bathroom doing cocaine and beats Fernando until he leaves. He was portrayed by Richard Delmonte.

=== Miriam ===
Miriam is Manny's beautiful blonde hair girlfriend. She is seen in bed with Manny the night when two hitmen try to kill Tony at the Babylon Club. She was portrayed by Sue Bowser.

=== Matos Gutierrez ===
Matos Gutierrez is a journalist who has learned the inner workings of Sosa's organization. He plans to testify at the United Nations Building in New York City. His testimony would be damaging to Sosa and his allies in both the Bolivian government and the United States government who have been assisting his organization. Sosa makes a deal to help Tony with his money laundering case. In exchange Tony has to kill Gutierrez in front of the U.N. Building. Tony, Chi-Chi, Ernie and Alberto stakeout the hotel Gutierrez is staying at. Alberto gets out of the car walks over to Gutierrez's vehicle and plants a bomb underneath the engine. They watch as Gutierrez gets into his car and picks up his wife and two daughters. Tony sternly objects to killing innocent women and children. Alberto insists that they carryout the hit on Gutierrez no matter what. Tony reluctantly follows Gutierrez's car. Alberto tells Tony to keep Gutierrez's vehicle in sight. As they follow Tony and Alberto become more and more irritated by each other. Finally Gutierrez pulls into the U.N. Building. Before Alberto could detonate the bomb, Tony shoots him in the head. He was portrayed by Carlos Cestero.

=== Seidelbaum ===
Seidelbaum is an undercover Detective in the Miami Police Department. He is known on the street as a professional criminal money launderer and becomes affiliated with Manny, who thinks Tony could use Seidelbaum to wash their dirty cash. A meeting is arranged between Tony, Chi-Chi, Seidelbaum and a team of uncover cops. They film the entire meeting with a camera through the face of a clock. They count Tony's money twice before they decide to cut the meeting short and bust both Tony and Chi-Chi. They are charged with federal income tax evasion. He was portrayed by Ted Beniades.

=== Luis ===
Luis is an undercover Detective in the Miami Police Department. He is part of the undercover operation headed by Detective Seidelbaum to bust Tony Montana. Seidelbaum and Luis convince Tony that they are running a professional money laundering operation, thus Tony decides to give them a shot. Tony and Chi-Chi bring boxes loaded with Tony's dirty Cash to be cleaned by Seidelbaum and Luis. While they count out the money, Luis starts a conversation with Chi-Chi about how Luis used to be an actor in his youth, enthralling Chi-Chi. They talk for several hours and count the cash twice. Then Tony wants to count it a third time. Finally, Seidelbaum and Luis have had enough and arrest both Tony and Chi-Chi on the spot. He was portrayed by Luis Espel.

=== Jerry The Banker ===
Jerry is a corrupt banker who helps Tony's organization launder their dirty cash. Jerry starts off more than willing to help Tony until Law Enforcement along with the Federal Government decide to crackdown on the illegal drug trade. Jerry then informs Tony that he has to raise the rates on washing his dirty money. Tony is very annoyed by Jerry changing the terms of their deal. Tony decides to part ways with Jerry and find another money launderer. He was portrayed by Dennis Holahan.

However in the game they resume working together again, with Montana certifying that he is a person he can trust.

=== Octavio The Clown ===
Octavio The Clown is an entertainer introduced by a comedian at the Babylon Club. The same night that Frank Lopez ordered a hit on Tony for offending him. Octavio is seen dancing on stage and mingling with the patrons at the club. As he approaches Tony's table the two hitmen decide to kill both Tony and Octavio. Tony survives the hit and kills both the hitmen, but not before they gun down Octavio. He was portrayed by Wayne Doba.
