= Scarface: The World Is Yours =

2006 video game

- Developer: Radical Entertainment
- Publisher: Vivendi Games (Note: Released under the Sierra Entertainment brand name)
- Producers: Cam Weber; Stephen Van der Mescht
- Designer: Pete Low
- Programmer: Tom Legal
- Artist: Michel Bowes
- Writer: David McKenna
- Composer: Marc Baril
- Platforms: Windows; PlayStation 2; Xbox; Wii
- Release: Windows, PlayStation 2, Xbox: NA: October 10, 2006; EU: October 13, 2006; Wii: NA: June 12, 2007; EU: July 6, 2007; AU: July 19, 2007
- Genre: Action-adventure
- Mode: Single-player

Scarface: The World Is Yours is a 2006 action-adventure video game developed by Radical Entertainment for the PlayStation 2, Xbox, and Windows, and published by Vivendi Games. It is based on the 1983 film of the same name written by Oliver Stone and directed by Brian De Palma. In 2007, a version with enhanced graphics was released for the Wii. A port for the Xbox 360 was also being developed, but was eventually scrapped.

The game is not a direct adaptation of the film but is instead a broad-strokes sequel that changes the ending so that Tony Montana (originally played by Al Pacino) survives and sets about exacting revenge on those who ousted him from power by re-establishing his drug empire in Miami, Florida. The game features Al Pacino's likeness for Montana, but Pacino does not voice the character, as he and the game's producers felt his voice had changed too much since the film was released in 1983. Instead, Montana is voiced by voice actor and comedian André Sogliuzzo, who was personally selected by Pacino. Actors from the original film who did voice work for the game include Steven Bauer, Robert Loggia, and Al Israel.

The game received moderately positive reviews, with many critics comparing it favorably to both 2002's Grand Theft Auto: Vice City and 2004's Grand Theft Auto: San Andreas. It was also praised for maintaining the tone of the film, for its humor, and for the accuracy of Montana's portrayal. The game was a commercial success, selling over two million units across all platforms.

== Gameplay ==
The HUD from the Wii version of the game. On the left is the mini-map, currently selected weapon, and cash Tony has laundered. On the right is the amount of cocaine Tony currently possesses and his dirty cash, which he has yet to place in the bank. To the right again are Tony's health meter and rage meter (the outer white circle).

Scarface: The World Is Yours is an open world action-adventure game played from a third-person perspective, in which the player controls Tony Montana as he attempts to regain control of Miami's drug trade, destroy rival gangs, and restore his reputation in the criminal underworld.

=== Combat ===
The basic gameplay and game mechanics fall into the subgenre of Grand Theft Auto clones. As such, the player can commandeer vehicles (cars and boats), move around the map on foot, interact with civilians and NPCs both hostile and non-hostile, engage in primary and sub-missions, and wield a variety of weapons: pistols, submachine guns, shotguns, assault rifles, a sniper rifle, a rocket launcher, a chainsaw, and various melee weapons, such as pipes and machetes. In a departure from most Grand Theft Auto (GTA)-style games, Tony cannot kill innocent people. If the player tries to shoot or attack a non-aggressive target, Tony will refuse to act; if the player tries to hit an innocent person with a car, they will only be injured. This keeps in line with the character's refusal to kill innocent men, women and children. As the game progresses, the player acquires access to some of Tony's employees as he rebuilds his empire: a driver, a boat pilot who can smuggle larger hauls of cocaine, an arms dealer who can supply weapons, an enforcer to protect Tony's businesses and attack those of his rivals, and a assassin who can eliminate other gangsters and drug dealers. When these employees have been unlocked, the player can switch control from Tony to any one of them (except the arms dealer), and when playing as the enforcer or the hitman, the player can kill innocent people.

When shooting, the player can lock on to the enemy or can aim manually, hitting specific body parts to produce different reactions. For example, if Tony shoots an opponent in the leg, they will fall but will continue to fire. If he hits an opponent in the arm, they will remain on their feet, but their aim will be compromised. Hitting opponents by aiming manually earns Montana more "balls" than using the lock-on system. Earning balls fills the "Balls meter", which is an essential component of combat in the game. Once the meter is full, "Blind Rage" mode becomes available. In this mode, the game switches to first-person and goes into slow motion, the aim becomes automatic, the player acquires infinite ammo and doesn't have to reload their weapon, and each enemy killed earns Tony health. Tony can also acquire balls by taunting defeated opponents, insulting drivers who have hit his car, winning street races, completing missions, and having conversations with random people.

=== Empire ===
There are four main geographical regions that Tony must control to complete the game; Little Havana, Downtown, South Beach and North Beach. At the start of the game, the entire map is available to explore, but Tony cannot carry out missions, attack rival gangs, or purchase property anywhere except Little Havana. Each turf must be controlled 100% before the next one becomes available for missions. Acquiring 100% requires the player to perform certain actions within each region: purchase a certain number of fronts, eliminate rival gangsters, and carry out smaller missions involving purchasing and selling cocaine. To purchase fronts, Tony must perform a mission for the owner before they will sell the business to him – these missions, coupled with storyline missions, form the core of the main game. Once purchased, fronts can come under attack from rival gangs. To combat this, Tony can install security cameras to alert him to an imminent attack and recruit guards to fend off attackers until he arrives on the scene. Once Tony has purchased the requisite number of fronts in a region, he must then take control of that region's storehouse, which will be in the possession of a rival gang.

A major part of the gameplay is "Reputation". There are eight Reputation levels (each level represented by a letter in the word "Scarface"), and certain items and missions cannot be unlocked until the player has reached a certain Reputation level. Reputation can be increased by various means, such as completing missions and buying fronts, completing side-missions, and buying "exotics" (extras used to decorate Tony's mansion). Rising in Reputation and increasing Tony's balls count also unlocks "femme fatales". If Tony can persuade these women to come to his mansion, they will give him stat increases, such as health, balls, and stamina upgrades.

The foundation of Tony's empire is dealing cocaine. To acquire cocaine to sell, players must complete side missions called "Felix leads". These involve Tony carrying out a mission for his contact Felix. Upon completing the mission, Felix will put Tony in touch with a cocaine supplier, from whom he can purchase cocaine. If it is a "small supplier", Tony can only purchase a certain amount of grams, which can be sold directly to street dealers or distributed through fronts. However, if it is a "large supplier", Tony can purchase kilos, which must be transferred to a storehouse. He must then go on a drug run, distributing cocaine to all of his fronts in a single mission, whilst being pursued by rival gang members, and certain fronts are attacked. Later in the game, Tony can purchase larger amounts of cocaine directly from Caribbean islands to the south of Miami, which he must then get back to the mainland via boat, avoiding pirates and the coast guard, before distributing the drugs to his fronts via a drug run.

=== Money and heat ===
Tony has access to two different types of money in the game. Cash on hand is called "dirty money". If the player dies, is arrested, or is shaken down by another gang, the player will lose all their dirty money. The only way to protect Tony's money, and ensure it is not lost when the player dies, is to launder it in a bank. The player is free to launder money at a bank any time they wish (except during missions), but each time they launder cash, the bank will take a cut of the total. The percentage of their cut is determined by the level of "cop heat" Tony currently has; the higher his heat, the higher their cut.

The "golf swing" minigame used for cocaine deals, bribing cops and intimidating gangs. Here Tony is selling cocaine to a street dealer. The player must try to land the meter in the white zone on the right to get maximum profit. If the meter lands in the "no deal" zone, Tony will be attacked.

"Cop heat" and "gang heat" are two meters that are active at all times during the game. Cop heat determines the rate of interest at banks, and gang heat determines the price of cocaine; the more heat, the less Tony can charge. If Tony, or any of his associates, engages in a lot of public violence, cop heat will rise, and the police will arrive, pursuing Tony. Cop heat can be lowered with bribes, and gang heat can be lowered by intimidating other gangs. If Tony continues to commit crimes in public, cop heat can rise to the point where he enters "You're fucked" mode, in which he cannot escape from the police alive. A "golf swing"-style minigame, where the player must attempt to stop the meter in a certain zone, is used to control negotiating drug deals, intimidating other gangs, and bribing cops.

== Plot ==
Scarface: The World Is Yours begins during the final scene of the film, in which drug kingpin Tony Montana (voiced by André Sogliuzzo) makes an apparent last stand as his mansion comes under attack from assassins sent by his former business partner-turned-enemy Alejandro Sosa (Robert Davi). Unlike in the film, however, Tony manages to overpower Sosa's men and barely escapes the grounds, just as the DEA and Miami-Dade Police Department arrive. One of Sosa's men calls Sosa after the attack, saying that Tony's mansion is being seized by law enforcement, his drug empire is reduced to nothing, and Tony himself is most likely dead. Meanwhile, hiding in a safe house in the Miami glades, Tony laments the deaths of his sister Gina and his friend Manny, curses himself for killing Manny and for not listening to the advice of others due to his stubbornness, decides to quit cocaine, and vows revenge on Sosa.

Three months later, in March 1984, Tony returns to Miami. All of his assets have been frozen, and the districts of Miami he used to dominate have been divided among other drug cartels. His first act is to ask criminal attorney George Sheffield (James Woods) to become his lawyer again. Sheffield reluctantly agrees but at a higher wage than before. He next travels to see his old friend and contact Felix (Carlos Ferro), who tells him Sosa is working with fellow crime boss Gaspar Gomez (Cheech Marin) to take over all of Tony's old turf. To rebuild his empire, Tony must first make enough money to buy his mansion from the Vice Squad, but he doesn't know any trustworthy drug dealers, as most report back to Sosa now. Felix tells him to speak to a waitress named Coco (Nika Futterman), who puts Tony in touch with some dealers with no ties to Sosa. Within a day, Tony earns enough cash to re-purchase his mansion and begins to slowly re-establish his name.

Felix later tells Tony that Gomez is smuggling cash, and gives him a tip about one of his trucks, which is carrying $50,000. Tony intercepts the truck and uses the money to open a bank account. Reconnecting with his old banker, Jerry (Michael York), he uses the bank to launder his money as he sets out to reclaim control of Little Havana from The Diaz Brothers. As Tony's reputation increases, the brothers plan to have him murdered. After surviving one of their assassination attempts, he interrogates the hitmen and learns The Diaz Brothers had his mother killed. Furious, Tony kills them both and regains control of Little Havana.

Tony is later called by Pablo (Wilmer Valderrama), an associate of Sheffield's, who claims to know the whereabouts of Tony's estranged wife, Elvira, and arranges a meeting. The meet turns out to be a trap, but Tony survives and kills Pablo. Realizing Sheffield turned on him, Tony cuts his ties with him. During this time, Tony sets about taking control of Downtown from the Contreras cartel. Upon doing so, he is contacted by "The Sandman" (Steven Bauer), a cocaine producer from the Caribbean islands south of Miami. Sandman also wants Sosa out of the picture and invites Tony to come see him. They agree that with Tony in Miami selling Sandman's product from the islands, they can run Sosa out of business. Tony then meets Venus (Cree Summer), Sandman's ex-girlfriend and a powerful influence on the islands herself. She tells him of the owner of a nearby casino being run on a disused oil tanker, who is killing women and dumping their bodies overboard, and asks Tony to take care of it. Tony goes to the casino and murders the owner, revealed to be Nacho Contreras, formerly in control of Downtown's drug trade.

After taking control of the South Beach and North Beach districts from Gomez, Tony is again contacted by Sandman, who tells him he has gone to war with the Colombian drug cartels and asks for his assistance. Tony helps Sandman defend his plantation before heading to his processing lab on the island of Tranquilandia, which has been taken over by the Colombians. After Tony kills them and rescues the workers, who were taken hostage, Sandman gives him ownership of his plantation. Now in charge of both production and distribution, Tony has become the most powerful drug lord in the area; henceforth he can finally go after Sosa, who is in Bolivia.

At his mansion, Sosa is hosting a meeting with Sheffield and Gomez to discuss how to best get rid of Tony. From outside, they hear an explosion as Tony attacks the mansion. Fighting his way through the grounds, he kills both Sheffield and Gomez before confronting Sosa himself. An argument ensues when Sosa tells Tony that he warned him not to betray him and that Tony did by refusing to assassinate a journalist for Sosa because there were children in the journalist's car. Tony grows appalled when Sosa claims that, in their business, child deaths are inevitable, and kills him in a shootout. As he leaves the mansion grounds, Tony finds one of Sosa's henchmen who survived the onslaught; the survivor begs for his life, and Tony offers him a job. The game ends with the henchman working as Tony's butler, as he and Venus watch television in a Jacuzzi. Feeling good about his life, Tony declares he finally has what he always felt was coming to him: "the world".

== Development ==
"The treacherous world of Scarface is a natural property to translate into a cinematic gameplay experience. The game will feature cutting-edge technology, a compelling storyline and the unprecedented experience of playing as one of Hollywood's most notorious gangsters."

— Michael Pole; Executive Vice-President, Vivendi Universal Games

The game was first announced on August 10, 2004, when Vivendi Universal Games revealed Radical Entertainment were working on a third-person shooter adaptation of the film for PC and several, as yet unnamed, current generation consoles, with a projected release date in the third quarter of 2005.

=== Writing ===
Originally, the developers had intended to do a straight adaptation of the film. However, they quickly concluded that doing so presented two inherent problems; the original screenplay was so good, they felt it couldn't be replicated in a gaming environment, and because Montana dies at the end, they felt players would not want to invest in developing a character that they knew was doomed from the beginning. As such, they decided the game would tell an original story, set after the film. Jason Bone, a combat designer on the game, explained: "We didn't want to rehash the movie because we feel that to make a good game, there needs to be a compelling storyline with good characters that drive you through it. There have been a lot of games that have been made based on movies, and when they follow the exact storyline of the movie, you lose a little bit of interest if you know where things are going. We felt that a fresh start would allow us to have the freedom to do new and interesting things to keep the player motivated and engaged."

They originally asked Oliver Stone, the film's screenwriter, if he would be interested in working on the script, but when Stone declined, they approached David McKenna, writer of the films American History X (1998) and Blow (2001). As a fan of the film, McKenna wanted to emphasize the over-the-top humor he perceived in the character of Montana. Shortly after the game had been released, IGN interviewed McKenna, asking him exactly how much of the game's 40,000 lines of dialogue he wrote. McKenna stated

I did work a lot on this thing. It was a pain in the ass! I didn't know what I was getting myself into. I didn't know anything about ancillary scenes, about how the character can go in different directions, he has to have a line of dialogue for every single character he encounters. I'm not a video game guy, I don't play video games [...] I put a lot of time into this but I only put, you know, several months. Radical put in several years, these guys were working on this thing forever. I gave them the best blueprint I could. I helped them as much as I could with dialogue, and ancillary scenes, I helped guide them as much as I could but in the end it's their baby. It was their world; I was just living in it for a little while.

Of the decision to change the end of the film so that Montana survives, McKenna dismissed critics who said the game was disrespecting the film and undermining the moral aspect of its narrative;

Get a life. It's a fucking game. We had fun continuing with it and taking a great character, having him survive at the end and reclaim his empire. I thought that was a good way to continue on the story [...] I wanted to kick off the game with Tony sitting in the tub, talking to a group of movie studio executives. He's saying "Why does the bad guy have to always die at the end? Well, fuck you! You die!" and then he pulls out a machine gun and blows them all away! And then he escapes from the mansion! But Vivendi Universal wouldn't do it. But the whole thing; it's a game, it's a joke. The people understand that I'm not trying to reinvent the wheel here with Scarface or do any destruction to the movie, it's one of my favorites. It's just having fun with something.

He further commented "What I did, I wanted to take that to the next level. It is a video game. People who are going to say, 'Hey he fucked with the movie,' that's being ridiculous. I wanted to have fun and kind of create something on my own while sticking to the same tone and flavor of the flick. People want to laugh when they're playing a game, and I just wanted to take advantage of that."

=== Development and delay ===
"Scarface is, first and foremost, about delivering the experience of being Tony Montana. It's about revenge, excess, indulgence, and having the balls to take what you want; all of these features come together as well as they do because they resonate with the core of Scarface: The World is Yours, namely: 'What Would Tony Montana Do?' At every stage of development, we've asked ourselves this question to ensure that our design and artistic decisions come from the right place. Tony is an unpredictable, comical, and likeable guy and this shines through in everything that he does. He also has a strong moral code. He doesn't think twice about taking down people who are in his way or trying to put him down, but he won't kill innocents (e.g. pedestrians, women, and children). He's a likeable, charismatic, and fun-to-play character and that makes Scarface a unique experience in open-world games."

— Geoff Thomas; producer Wii version

In December 2004, Vivendi announced the game would be released for PlayStation 2 and Xbox, as well as the already announced PC release.

The game was first shown as a non-playable demo at the 2005 GDC in March when it was revealed it was no longer a third-person shooter, but was now a GTA-style open world game. Vivendi stated the game would be non-linear, with players free to do missions in whichever order they wish, with an estimated playtime of 50–60 hours. Vivendi also made a point that Montana would be unable to kill innocent people in the game. Producer Cam Weber explained the concept of Rage mode, which was on show in the demo, was very much inspired by the film; "For fans of the movie, you'll remember that Tony has this crazy temper that every once in a while gets set off. You hear the organ music play, you see a camera cut to the intensity in his eyes, and he just suddenly snaps. He loses it; he completely loses control and does some violent things."

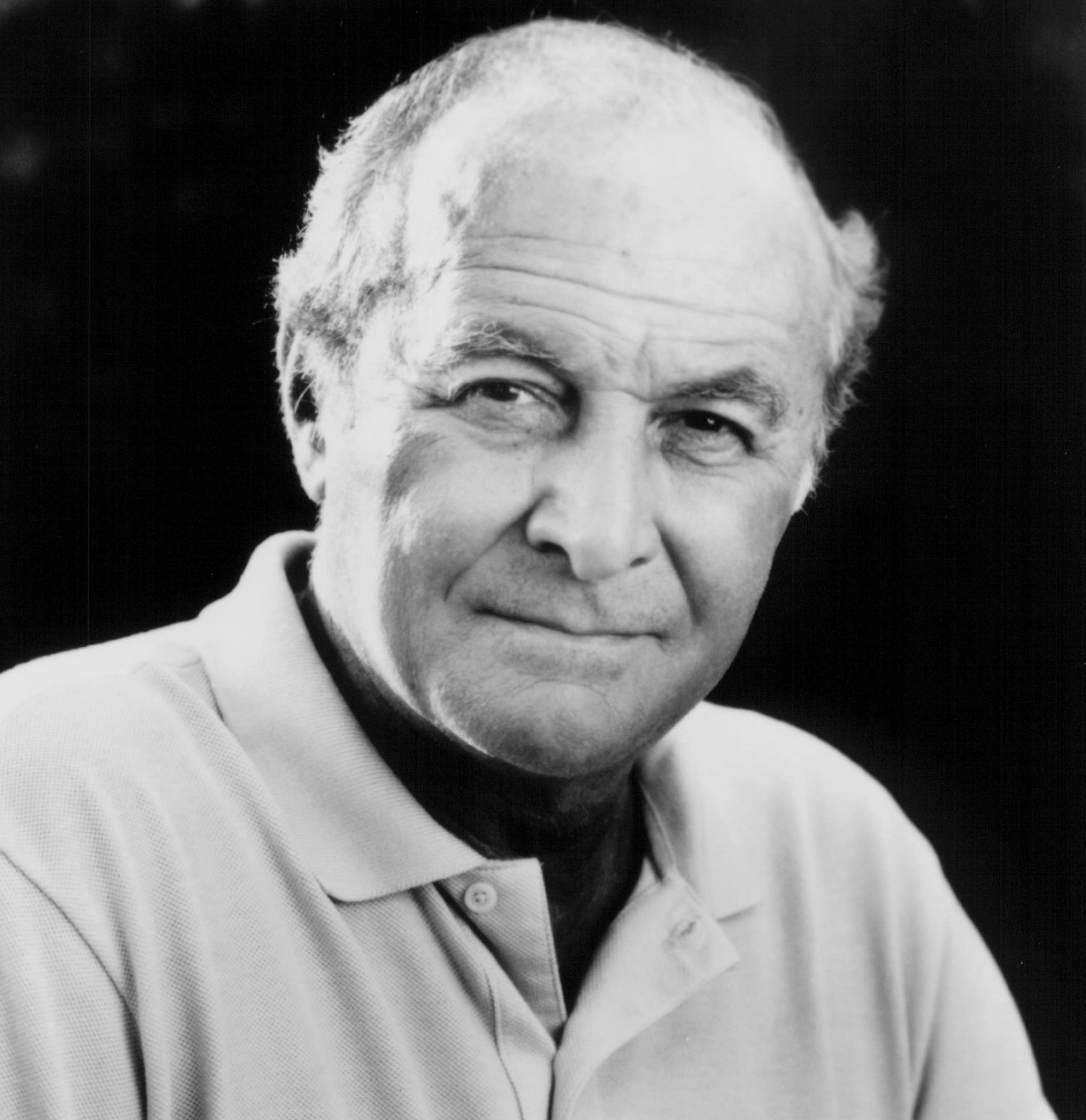
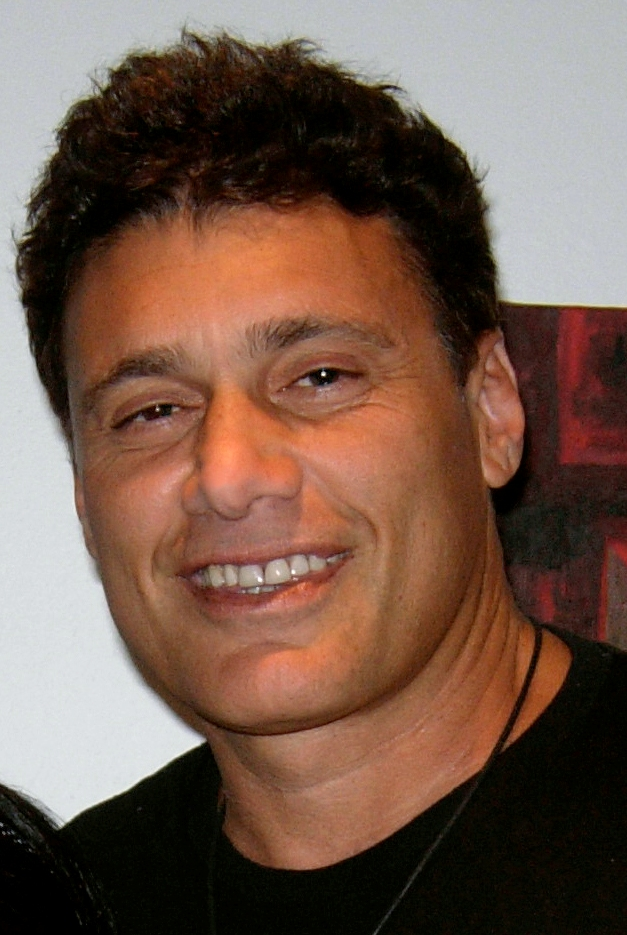
Robert Loggia (left) and Steven Bauer (right), who respectively played Frank and Manny in the original film, both returned to voice characters in the game. Loggia voices several civilians and narrates the game. Bauer voices "The Sandman" and one of the Diaz Brothers.

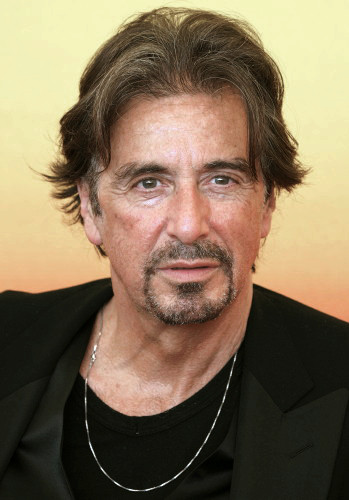
Al Pacino, who played Tony Montana in the film, allowed for his likeness to be used in the game, but he did not voice the character of Montana. He did, however, hand-pick the actor who did.

In April, Vivendi revealed the title of the game would be Scarface: The World Is Yours, and while it would feature Al Pacino's likeness, Pacino himself would not be voicing Montana. While it was not announced who was voicing the role, multiple other cast members were revealed; Steven Bauer, Robert Loggia, Jay Mohr, Cheech Marin, James Woods, Miguel Sandoval, Robert Davi, Michael Rapaport, and Michael York. Vivendi's chief strategy and marketing officer, Cindy Cook stated "Al Pacino brought the character of Tony Montana to life onscreen in a very powerful way, and the inclusion of his likeness as Tony Montana is a critical component to the authenticity of the Scarface game experience. We are also thrilled to have other top-notch talent involved with Scarface: The World is Yours, as their participation will add further substance and depth to the characters featured in the game."

In May, Vivendi announced the game's release had been pushed back to 2006. In the same statement, they revealed the game was being developed for the Xbox 360 as well as the PS2, Xbox and PC. The Xbox version of the game was first made available in playable form (albeit not playable by the public) at E3 2005 in May. Radical stated the PC and PlayStation 2 versions would be identical to the Xbox version, although the Xbox 360 version would have some unique features.

=== Re-design ===
In late March 2006, Vivendi gave pre-alpha builds of the PlayStation 2 version of the game to both IGN and GameSpot. They explained that since E3 2005, Radical had given the entire game an overhaul, improving the design and creating a more compelling storyline. They had also tweaked the gameplay to appeal to both casual gamers and more hardcore gamers. These changes had been implemented after some negative feedback from both the public and the gaming press following the E3 demo. Writers had been especially critical of the look of the game, and one of Radical's alterations was to repaint every external texture. Jason Bone stated the negative feedback was a good thing, as Radical had underestimated the difficulty of making a large open world game; "We do have a bit of experience with open world games, but they were on a much smaller scale – there wasn't a lot of detail in them. With this game, we needed it to feel cinematic and yet be an open-world game." The negative feedback made them realize the game needed more work. Bone also stated work had not begun on the Xbox 360 version, as they didn't want it to be a direct port, nor did they want it to distract them from the PS2, PC and Xbox versions. He also suggested that a PlayStation 3 version was under consideration.

The alpha build of the game was shown by Vivendi at the pre-E3 2006 show in April. Vivendi also released another list of voice actors who were appearing in the game; Al Israel, Ice-T, Oliver Platt, Daniel Dae Kim, Willa Holland, Roma Maffia, Robert LaSardo, Brenda Strong, Dale Earnhardt Jr., Ricky Gervais, Michael Rooker, Jason Mewes, Anthony Anderson, Rick Yune, Wilmer Valderrama, Kevin Dillon, Jerry Ferrara, Richard Roundtree, Tommy Lister Jr., Bai Ling, Bam Margera, Cree Summer, N.O.R.E., Tommy Lee, B-Real, Sen Dog, and Elliott Gould. It was also revealed the actor voicing Montana, André Sogliuzzo, had been hand-picked by Al Pacino. In July, it was revealed Pacino had turned down the opportunity to lend his likeness to Electronic Arts' Godfather adaptation so he could appear instead in Scarface. It was also explained the reason Pacino himself was not voicing Montana was that he simply didn't sound like Montana anymore. According to Vivendi's Adam Roberts; "He just can't physically do it any more. He tried, but it took a lot of physical effort to do Montana's voice – it's very heavily accented, very difficult for him to do."

In August, a Collector's Edition of the game for the PlayStation 2 was announced, which would include the game, a bonus DVD including a "Making of" documentary, a video walkthrough with producer commentary, cast interviews, hints and tips, a full map of the game world and concept art.

=== PSP version ===
On July 28, Vivendi announced a Scarface game was also being developed for the PlayStation Portable. However, it would be a completely different game from The World is Yours. Called Scarface: Money. Power. Respect., the game was being developed by FarSight Studios, and would combine turn-based strategy with real-time combat as rival gangs vie to take control of Miami. On the same day, Vivendi also revealed the Xbox 360 version of The World is Yours had been cancelled, for undisclosed reasons.

=== Music ===
In August, Vivendi revealed the soundtrack, of over 100 songs, would feature music from the likes of Beth Andersen, Johnny Cash, Control Machete, Grandmaster Flash and the Furious Five, Ministry, Debbie Harry, Rick James, Iggy Pop, Judas Priest, Public Enemy, Rohff, Run-DMC, Shannon, Burning Spear, and Peter Tosh, as well as the entirety of Giorgio Moroder's original score for the film. They also revealed details of the "Mix Tape" feature, which would allow players to customize the in-game soundtrack in any way they wished. Cindy Cook, chief marketing officer at Vivendi, stated:

Throughout the development process we have focused on giving the player the power to choose their own in-game music experience, whether it be the Scarface purist that wants only the film score, the player that wants authentic music from the time or the fan that craves the hottest tracks from today's talent. We can offer this choice through our new 'Mix Tape' music mixer and an incredible lineup of 1980s and contemporary artists that are bringing their hits to the game. Generations of film fans and gamers will be able to create an experience that best suits their unique tastes.

The game's soundtrack, Scarface: The World Is Yours – Original Game Music Score, composed by Marc Baril, was released by Universal Music in October 2006. The track features no music from the film, only original music from the game.

=== Wii version ===
"Bringing Scarface: The World Is Yours to Wii is an exciting opportunity to take an already amazing game and add an incredible twist, thanks to the Wii console's unique remote controller abilities. Adding motion-sensitive elements to a game that already includes an incredible celebrity cast, Hollywood production values and non-stop action, delivers a gaming experience unlike any other, truly bringing the world of Tony Montana to vivid life."

— Cindy Cook; Chief strategy and marketing officer, Vivendi Universal Games.

In January 2007, NGamer revealed The World Is Yours was being ported to the Wii. On March 1, Vivendi confirmed the game was scheduled for a summer release, and would be identical to the other versions, but would feature Wii Remote controls and enhanced graphics.

The game was first shown on April 10, at which time the controls were demonstrated. IGN was impressed: "The pointing function works well in Scarface. Just like the PC version's mouse control, players now have near pin-point weapon precision that makes it easier and more intuitive to gun down the opposition with the huge assortment of firepower within the experience. You can still target individuals to tighten up your aim using the Z button on the nunchuk, but because the Wii Remote's pointer already does a great job with its precision we rarely found ourselves using it." GameSpot were less impressed; "When you're wielding the chainsaw, its movement will be tied to that of the Wii Remote, and by slashing in different directions and at different heights you'll be able to target enemies' heads, legs, and individual arms. With practice, you'll purportedly be able to remove all of the aforementioned extremities before the torso hits the ground, but the associate producer showing us the game on this occasion never managed to pull it off."

Vivendi also confirmed the game would be entirely uncut, making it the most violent game available for the Wii. It was later announced the economy in the game had been adjusted to give players greater rewards for earlier missions, and the price of some of the "exotics" had been lowered.

=== Marketing ===
As part of a cross-promotional deal, Vivendi partnered with the online casino site Bodog where product placements for the Bodog brand are incorporated in several gambling minigames such as video poker, slot machines and blackjack, as well as billboards promoting the brand including its music label and an appearance by Bodog founder Calvin Ayre as a non-player character. Bodog also held an online contest with copies of the game as prizes, and a trip to the company retreat in Costa Rica as the grand prize.

== Reception ==
Reception

Aggregate score
Aggregator	Score			
Aggregator	PC	PS2	Wii	Xbox
Metacritic	73/100	75/100	71/100	76/100

Review scores
Publication	Score			
Publication	PC	PS2	Wii	Xbox
AllGame		3.5/5		3.5/5
Eurogamer			7/10	7/10
Game Informer		8.5/10		
GameSpot	6/10	6.4/10	5.8/10	6.6/10
GameSpy		4/5		
GameTrailers		8/10		8/10
IGN	8.7/10	8.7/10	8.5/10	8.7/10
NGamer			8.2/10	
Nintendo Power			7.5/10	
Official U.S. PlayStation Magazine		3.5/5		
Official Xbox Magazine (US)				4.5/10
PC Gamer (US)	82%			

The World Is Yours received generally positive reviews across all systems; the PlayStation 2 version holds an aggregate score of 75 out of 100 on Metacritic, based on forty-six reviews; the Xbox version 76 out of 100, based on forty-one reviews; the PC version 73 out of 100, based on eighteen reviews; and the Wii version 71 out of 100, based on twenty-three reviews.

IGN's Chris Roper was extremely impressed, scoring the PC, PlayStation 2 and Xbox versions 8.7 out of 10, and giving the game an "Editor's Choice" award. The Xbox version was also awarded the October "Xbox Game of the Month" award. Roper dismissed notions that the game was simply a Grand Theft Auto clone, arguing instead that it advanced the genre; "much of Scarface is based on what we've seen in Grand Theft Auto. It's fairly obvious that Radical used said series as the blueprint and then went back and re-evaluated its shortcomings. The result is that we have a game that fixes many of GTA's problematic elements." He praised the basic gameplay, the storyline, the ball meter, the rage mode, and the aiming system. Although he was somewhat critical of the map, arguing too many areas in the game are accessible via only one road, he concluded "There are a whole lot of little things about Scarface that make it fun, but it's the sum of its parts that make it the overall great game that it is. It does a whole lot to fix many of the problems with other games in the genre, and it does a fantastic job of bringing the world of Scarface to gamers." Mark Bozon and Chris Roper scored the Wii version 8.5 out of 10, also giving it an "Editor's Choice" award, and writing "Scarface is a very impressive game, and while there isn't a ton of Wii-specific additions to the package, everything that was added makes a big difference." Praising the controls, they wrote "it's amazingly easy to target enemies and blow off specific body parts in the process." They called it "an intelligent, high-budget, astonishingly impressive game", arguing "Wii owners that fit in the hardcore crowd will eat this one up, as it's currently one of the deepest and most entertaining experiences on the system."

Game Informer's Matt Helgeson scored the PlayStation 2 version 8.5 out of 10, calling it "a very playable and addictive open-world game that manages to put its fresh spin on the familiar genre." He was critical of the side missions, calling them "very repetitive", but he concluded "Overall, I had a great time with Scarface. It's every bit as profane, violent, and over-the-top as the movie, and delivers not only the gunplay you're expecting but as much depth as almost any other game in the genre."

GameSpy's Justin Speer scored the PlayStation 2 version 4 out of 5, calling it "a ridiculously violent, unbelievably profane game that lets you glorify yourself with virtual millions of dollars in hard-earned drug money, fast cars, boats, underlings, women and copious amounts of blood. It's a good feeling." However, he noted that "gamers who are getting used to the next-generation of console visuals aren't going to be impressed with either the PS2 or the Xbox version." He also argued the game becomes somewhat repetitive towards the end. However, he concluded "Scarface is a long-lasting experience that's simply a lot of fun. Part guilty pleasure, a part blazingly successful experiment in game design, Scarface: The World is Yours is worth a shot."

Eurogamer's Kristan Reed scored the Xbox version 7 out of 10, calling it a "surprisingly well put-together take on the genre", with his biggest criticism being the semi-linear nature of the gameplay. He concluded "Scarface is only ever a fun, solid competent Grand Theft Also-ran and never a classic [...] Scarface is certainly several notches above the derivative insult we expected it would be, and those who can bear to wait another year for the next GTA will be well served by its faithfulness to the popular formula. Groundbreaking it isn't, but fun it is." Dan Whitehead also scored the Wii version 7 out of 10. Of the control system, he wrote, "It's not that the new control system is unworkable, just that it's a fairly needless change dictated by the Wii itself rather than gameplay necessity. It's fiddly to learn, often awkward to use when it matters most, yet doesn't reward you with any tangible benefits when you master it." He concluded "Given the drought currently afflicting the Wii, it seems churlish to completely dismiss Scarface's many amusements just because of control issues, especially as they can be accommodated with patience and practice. For the bulk of its playing time Scarface remains an indecently entertaining bad-taste romp."

GameSpot's Jeff Gerstmann was less impressed, scoring the PC version 6 out of 10, the PS2 version 6.4 out of 10 and the Xbox version 6.6 out of 10, and calling the game "a foul-mouthed and bloody adventure that does next to nothing with the characters [...] The whole experience feels flat and often self-conscious." Of the PC version, he wrote "even on machines that go way beyond the game's recommended system requirements, we noticed plenty of frame rate trouble and slowdown. The textures aren't pretty, and overall, the game looks like a quick and dirty console port." He concluded "Overall, Scarface: The World Is Yours is more a victim of some poor design choices than any glaring technical issues. [...] by taking the focus off of the gameplay elements that you'd want in an open-city game and putting it more on the game's bland mission design and all the dull side tasks you'll have to do to earn a reputation, Scarface doesn't play to its potential strengths. The result is a functional game that presents an interesting premise, but underneath you'll find a wholly uninteresting game." He was even more critical of the Wii version, scoring it 5.8 out of 10, writing "the gamepad-to-Wii Remote transition has made this lacklustre gameplay even worse." He was extremely critical of the controls; "while it's somewhat impressive on some level that the developer managed to cram a standard gamepad-controlled game onto the Wii Remote and Nunchuk, it's never fun to play, and you'll feel like you're fighting the controls from start to finish."

The editors of Computer Games Magazine presented Scarface with their 2006 "Best Soundtrack" award. The Academy of Interactive Arts & Sciences nominated Scarface for "Outstanding Achievement in Soundtrack" at the 10th Annual Interactive Achievement Awards.

=== Sales ===
Scarface sold well on the PlayStation 2 and Xbox, but not on PC. In its first week on Best Buy, the PlayStation 2 version was the second–highest selling game, the Collector's Edition was the eighth and the Xbox version was the thirteenth. Together, the two PS2 versions outsold the number one game that week; Tiger Woods PGA Tour 07. By the end of October, the game was the top-selling game of the month; the combined regular and collector's editions on the PS2 was the best-selling game in North America in October, with over 366,000 units sold, earning over $18.7 million. The Xbox version sold over 110,000 units, earning over $5.4 million. The PC version sold only 9,000 units, earning less than $450,000. By the end of November, the game had sold over one million copies worldwide across all three systems. By March 2007, the PlayStation and Xbox versions had sold over 1.5 million copies between them. By May 2007, the game sold more than 2 million copies worldwide.

In Germany, the game was banned for high-impact violence and cruelty.

== Cancelled sequels ==
In July 2005, Vivendi president Phil O'Neil intimated there were plans to turn Scarface into a multigame franchise, saying "a Scarface 2, a Scarface 3, a Scarface 4, and consecutive iterations of that product [are] a really important component of what we're trying to do here." When the rights to the property were transferred to Activision Blizzard on July 10, 2008, however, Scarface 2 was not included in their list of upcoming games. Although, the rights were later transferred back to Universal Pictures, no further news was heard. On June 23, 2022, gameplay footage of Scarface: Empire was leaked by YouTuber Mafia Game Videos showing the game in a pre-alpha state. The game was meant to take place in Las Vegas, Nevada.

== Planned re-release ==
On October 22, 2025, a group claiming to be Hong Kong-based publisher EC Digital announced plans to re-release the game on Steam and the Epic Games Store, though it was reportedly released earlier than its intended date and was quickly delisted from storefronts. Gaming news sites have noted the suspicious circumstances surrounding both the re-release and the entity responsible, and also reported that the re-release incorporated the fan-made patches "SilentPatch" by Silent and "FusionFix" without the original authors' permission, as well as AI upscaled art assets as downloadable content. Silent also expressed concern about the legality of the re-release in an X (formerly known as Twitter) post, stating, "I KNOW that the holder of the Scarface license wasn't willing to re-release the game, so this is suspect."
