= Scarface Nation =

2008 book by Ken Tucker

- Author: Ken Tucker
- Language: English
- Subject: Scarface
- Genre: Non-fiction
- Publisher: St. Martin's Press
- Publication date: 2008
- Publication place: United States

Scarface Nation: The Ultimate Gangster Movie and How It Changed America is a 2008 book written by Ken Tucker and published by St. Martin's Press about the 1983 American crime film Scarface and its influence on society, film, and the music industry.

== Background ==
Tucker is a former critic for The Philadelphia Inquirer. He interviewed most of the film's cast and crew, except Al Pacino and Michelle Pfeiffer. He observed that they were unaware of the reasons for the popularity and influence of the film. Tucker researched for two years; he read the 1930 novel Scarface by Armitage Trail and watched both the 1932 and 1983 films numerous times. He also bought a lot of Scarface-related products, such as flip-flops, shower curtains, dartboards, and poker chips. The Scarface pajamas that he bought "kind of freaked out [his] wife".

== Content ==
The book is divided into seven main chapters: Major Immigrant Smuggling Ring, The Director, Scarface Music, Howard Hawk's Scarface, Armitage Trail's Scarface, Movies TV Shows Novels, and A Meaning of Scarface. An appendix titled "Scarface as a business plan (or the 8 Habits of Highly Successful but Tragic Gangsters)" was also included in the book. Martin Scorsese told Steven Bauer that "Hollywood is going to hate this film, because it's about them". Tucker notes that the film was created by White males, yet it has influenced Black and Hispanic youth the most. By the suggestion of Sidney Lumet, the origin of the main character Tony Montana was changed from an Italian to a Cuban. In his work, Tucker calls Scarface an "ultimate gangster film" and "a great shallow masterpiece".

== Reception ==
Louis Bayard wrote for Salon that Tucker had set a difficult mission for himself, writing about a film that was "not good at all". S. James Snyder wrote for Time magazine that "Tucker bolsters his argument that whatever your opinion on the film, Scarface cannot be dismissed."
