= Scarface: Money. Power. Respect. =

2006 video game

- Developer: FarSight Studios
- Publisher: Vivendi Games (Note: Released under the Sierra Entertainment brand name)
- Platforms: PlayStation Portable; Windows Mobile
- Release: NA: October 10, 2006; EU: November 17, 2006
- Genre: Turn-based strategy
- Modes: Single-player, multiplayer

Scarface: Money. Power. Respect. is a 2006 video game released for the PlayStation Portable and Windows Mobile, based on the 1983 film starring Al Pacino. Unlike Scarface: The World Is Yours, which was developed by Radical Entertainment for the PlayStation 2, Xbox, Microsoft Windows, and Wii, Scarface: Money. Power. Respect. was developed by FarSight Studios and is a turn-based strategy game featuring both single-player and multiplayer modes.

== Gameplay ==
The game starts with Frank Lopez teaching Tony Montana (and by extension, the player) the basics of the drug trade. Scarface: Money. Power. Respect. has two core elements: selling drugs and building up the Lopez Cartel's assets, and dealing with rival cartels using diplomacy, manipulation, and violence. Frank will assign Tony specific orders and objectives to complete (some of which come with large monetary rewards), but the player must make all other decisions on their own.

There are three types of drugs that the player can sell during the "dealing phase": cocaine, heroin, and marijuana, each of which has a unique street value based on who controls the territory in which it is sold. Drugs can be purchased from suppliers through black market auctions, where all of the cartels compete with each other to obtain the largest supply. More territory results in larger amounts of drugs being made available to the player for purchase.

The player must also have drug labs and storehouses in place to process the drugs until they can be sold, or risk losing their investment. They also need to hire crews of "pushers" to make the sales, and "thugs" to protect their territory from other cartels, pay for upgrades to their labs and storehouses, and provide bail money for crew members who get arrested by the police. Each purchase is subtracted from the cartel's bank account, and if the player runs out of money or doesn't manage the cartel's business effectively, Frank will remove them from power and the game is over.

A large in-game map tracks the overall balance of power in Miami's underworld, with each cartel having their own color to mark which territories they control. During the "combat phase", the cartels will fight each other for territory, and if the player decides to launch an attack or gets attacked, the game enters into a real-time battle system where "thugs" from both sides will shoot at each other until one side is completely wiped out. The player can order their side to attack certain enemies, hire more thugs to replace those killed in combat, or even order a retreat to avoid losing men, although this will come at the cost of territory. Battles between rival cartels can shift control of their territories and result in unexpected changes to the map.

A key aspect of Scarface: Money. Power. Respect. is the "Power Move" system. Cartel bosses can execute power moves at any moment, such as boosting the production of their drug facilities, flooding the streets with low-quality product to lower prices, arming their thugs with better weapons, or even unleashing bribed law enforcement to stop the sale of certain drugs outright. The player is encouraged to purchase power moves whenever possible, as they can be the difference between victory and defeat. There is also an "Alliance" system, where cartels can form temporary partnerships to prevent fights and split the profits from drug sales in their territories.

== Reception ==
Reception

Aggregate scores
Aggregator	Score
GameRankings	54.73%
Metacritic	58/100

Review scores
Publication	Score
GameSpot	7.3/10
GameSpy	3/5
GamesRadar+	2.5/5
GameZone	6.2/10
IGN	6.5/10
PSM3	3.3/10

Reviews of the game were mainly mixed, as GameRankings gave it a score of 54.73%, while Metacritic calculated an average score of 58 out of 100.

Richard Grisham of GamesRadar+ praised the use of scenes from the film, the power-move system and the ad hoc multiplayer mode, but found the tasks preceding combat monotonous. He also criticised the absence of online multiplayer and game sharing, concluding that the game did not offer enough variety to remain engaging for long.
