= Ken Tucker =

American arts and entertainment critic

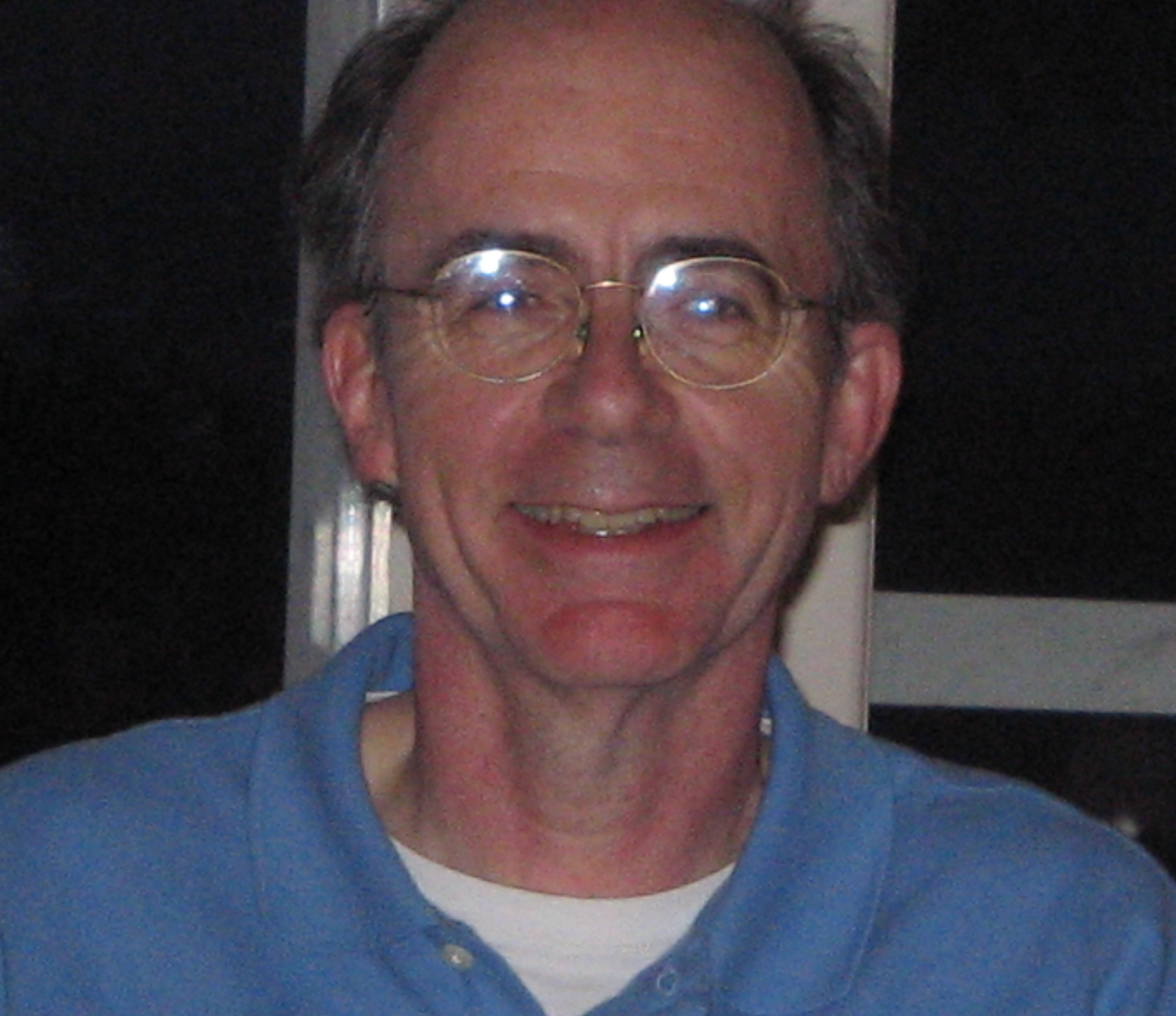
- Tucker in 2008
- Born: Kenneth Tucker; Manhattan, New York City, New York, U.S.
- Education: B.A., English, New York University
- Occupations: Arts critic; magazine editor; nonfiction book author
- Years active: 1974–present
- Website: kentucker.net

Kenneth Tucker is an American arts, music and television critic, magazine editor, and nonfiction book author.

== Early life and education ==
Tucker was born in Manhattan, New York City, New York, and raised in Stamford, Connecticut. He earned a bachelor's degree in English from New York University.

== Career ==
While attending NYU, he began writing freelance reviews for The Village Voice, SoHo Weekly News, and Rolling Stone. From 1979 to 1983, Tucker was the rock critic for the Los Angeles Herald-Examiner. From 1983 to 1990, he worked at The Philadelphia Inquirer, first as the newspaper's rock critic, and then its television critic.

In 1990, he joined Entertainment Weekly (a Time Inc. publication) as a founding staffer. He was the magazine's television critic, DVD critic and an editor-at-large until 2013, except for one year (2005–06) as film critic at New York Magazine.

Since 1982, Tucker has been a rock and pop music critic for the National Public Radio (NPR) talk show Fresh Air with Terry Gross.

Tucker has appeared many times on television, including multiple appearances on The Today Show, Good Morning America, The Charlie Rose Show, and The Late Late Show with Craig Ferguson. He appears in the 1984 documentary The Gospel According to Al Green. He is interviewed on-camera in Cartoon College, a documentary about the history of comics.

== Reception ==
Tucker's reviews have provoked some notable responses from his subjects. In August 1980, Billy Joel, enraged by a negative review of his music Tucker had written in the L.A. Herald Examiner, tore up the review on stage during one of his concerts.

Tucker's negative reviews of Seth MacFarlane’s animated series Family Guy resulted in a number of MacFarlane counter-criticisms, including a scene in which Stewie Griffin breaks the neck of an Entertainment Weekly writer widely assumed to be Tucker.

== Awards ==
For his critical writings, Tucker was a finalist for the Pulitzer Prize in Criticism in 1984, the first rock critic to become a Pulitzer finalist. He won a National Magazine Award in 1995 and has twice won a Deems Taylor Award by the American Society of Composers, Authors and Publishers (ASCAP).

== Writings ==
=== Articles and essays ===
Tucker has written frequently about poetry and comic books, most notably for The New York Times Book Review and The Best American Poetry blog. His 1985 New York Times review of the serialized portions of Art Spiegelman’s then-work-in-progress Maus is considered a factor in the mainstream acceptance of graphic novels and the publication of Maus by Pantheon Books.

He has contributed essays to the following anthologies:

- Miller, Jim, ed. The Rolling Stone Illustrated History of Rock & Roll, 1st Ed., New York: Rolling Stone Press, 1976. ISBN 0394403274
- Country: The Music and the Musicians, New York: Abbeville Press, 1988. ISBN 0896598683
- Cooking and Stealing: The TIN HOUSE Non-Fiction Reader, New York: Bloomsbury USA, 2004. ISBN 1582344868

=== Books ===
- Scarface Nation – The Ultimate Gangster Movie and How It Changed America, New York City, New York: St. Martin's Griffin, 2008. ISBN 978-0-312-33059-0
- Tucker, Ken; Stokes, Geoffrey; Ward, Ed. Rock of Ages: The Rolling Stone History of Rock & Roll, New York: Summit, 1986. ISBN 0671544381
- Kissing Bill O'Reilly, Roasting Miss Piggy – 100 Things To Love and Hate About TV, New York City, New York: St. Martin's Press, 2005. ISBN 978-0-312-33057-6

== See also ==
- List of American print journalists
- List of American writers
- List of critics
- List of National Public Radio personnel
- List of non-fiction writers
