= Kate Bock =

Canadian model

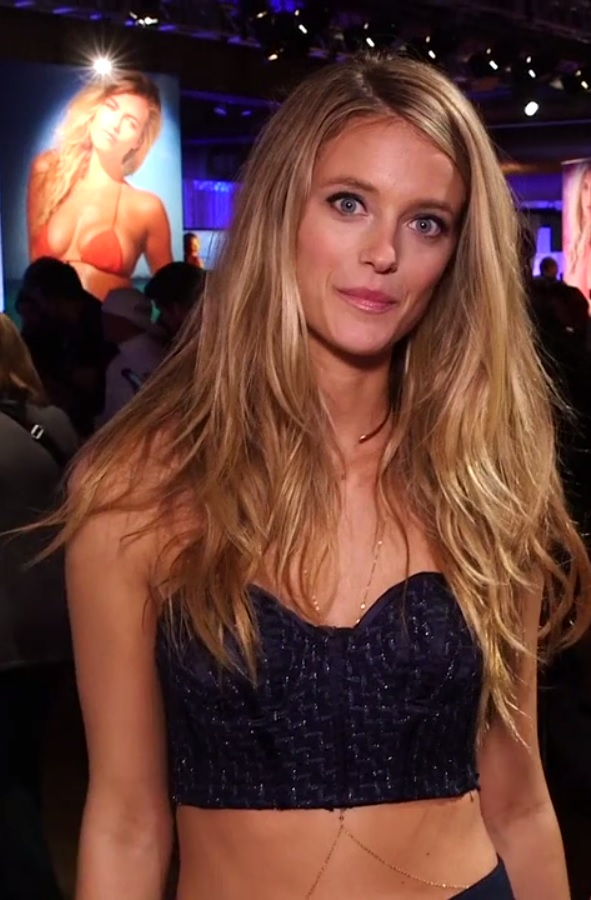
- Bock in 2016
- Born: Kate Lynne Bock; 30 January 1988 (age 38); Vancouver, British Columbia, Canada
- Occupations: Model; entrepreneur
- Spouse: Kevin Love (m. 2022)
- Children: 2
- Modelling information
- Height: 5 ft 11 in (1.80 m)
- Hair colour: Blonde
- Eye colour: Blue
- Agency: The Society Management (New York); Why Not Model Management (Milan); Storm Management (London)
- Website: www.katebock.com

Kate Lynne Love (née Bock;born 30 January 1988) is a Canadian model. She is known for her appearances in the Sports Illustrated Swimsuit Issue since 2013. In 2020, she appeared on the cover, alongside Olivia Culpo and Jasmine Sanders.

== Early life ==
Bock was born in Vancouver. She studied at a French immersion school in Canada and speaks fluent French. Growing up in Canada, she was into sports, including swimming, soccer, baseball and field hockey. Bock is Jewish.

== Career ==
Bock was discovered aged 12 at a local swimming pool in Vancouver. She subsequently signed a modeling contract and traveled to Santa Barbara to shoot for Abercrombie Kids. At age 18, she moved to Paris.

Bock appeared in numerous magazines such as Germany's Vogue, Hungary's Glamour and Italy's Elle. She has been featured in magazine covers of the US' Ocean Drive and Fitness, Australia's Grazia, UK's Glow, Canada's Elle and Maxim.

She has been featured in advertisements by a number of major brands including Victoria's Secret, Guess, Brooks Brothers, L'Oréal, Kérastase, Banana Republic and Ralph Lauren. In 2011, Bock appeared as a character parodying Elvira Hancock in the music video for the song "Jack Sparrow" by comedy troupe The Lonely Island.

In December 2021, Bock launched a swimwear capsule collection with Australian brand Bond-Eye, which included five styles. She has also designed a jewelry line called Cattura.

In 2021, she started working as a chief brand officer for hard sparkling water brand Pompette and a creative consultant for the shopping application Verishop.

== Personal life ==
Bock had been dating professional basketball player Kevin Love for "nearly five years" in 2020, before her engagement with him on 31 January 2021. They got married in late June 2022 at the New York Public Library, with the wedding theme inspired by The Great Gatsby. In June 2023, Bock gave birth to the couple's first child, during the 2023 NBA Finals. They have 2 daughters, James and Leighton.
