= Frank Lopez =

Frank Lopez or López may refer to:

- Frank Lopez, a character in the 1983 film Scarface
- Frank López García (born 1995), Cuban footballer
- Frank López (footballer, born 1989), Belizean footballer
- Franklin López (born 1982), Nicaraguan footballer
