= Tony Montana =

Character in Scarface

- Al Pacino as Tony Montana in the 1983 film
- First appearance: Scarface (1983)
- Last appearance: Payday 2 (2016)
- Created by: Armitage Trail
- Based on: Tony Guarino/Camonte
- Portrayed by: Al Pacino
- Voiced by: André Sogliuzzo (The World Is Yours)

In-universe information
- Full name: Antonio Montana
- Occupation: Soldier (formerly); Drug lord
- Family: Gina Montana-Ribera (sister); Georgina Montana (mother)
- Spouse: Elvira Hancock
- Nationality: Cuban

Antonio "Tony" Montana is a fictional character and the villain protagonist of the epic crime drama film Scarface (1983). Originally created by Armitage Trail, the character is portrayed by American actor Al Pacino in the original film and is voiced by André Sogliuzzo in the video game Scarface: The World Is Yours (2006). Embodying the possibility of a person rising from the bottom of society to the top, Tony Montana has become a cultural icon, as well as one of the most iconic film characters of all time.

In 2008, Montana was named the 27th Greatest Movie Character by Empire magazine. The character is partly based on Tony Camonte, the protagonist of the 1932 film; Camonte was, in turn, an adaptation of Tony Guarino from the 1929 novel, which in turn was a loose fictionalization of real-life Italian-American gangster and businessman Al Capone, who was born in Brooklyn, New York in 1899. In contrast to Guarino and Camonte, who were Italian immigrants, Montana is a Cuban immigrant. According to Oliver Stone, Tony's last name was inspired by then-National Football League (NFL) quarterback Joe Montana, Stone's favorite player. A prequel novel, Scarface: The Beginning, written by Leslie Esdaile Banks, was published in 2006. Montana has a large scar on his face, the source of the name "Scarface", and inspired by the scar Al Capone had.

== Casting ==
Pacino insisted on taking the lead role in Scarface. Pacino worked with various trainers for the role, including experts in knife combat and Panamanian professional boxer Roberto Durán. Durán also helped inspire the character, who had "a certain lion in him", according to Pacino. Meryl Streep's immigrant character in Sophie's Choice (1982) also influenced Pacino's portrayal of Tony Montana. His co-star Steven Bauer, and a dialect coach, helped him learn aspects of the Cuban dialect and pronunciation.

== Fictional character biography ==
In May 1980, Montana is among the 125,000 Cubans on the Mariel boatlift to Miami, Florida. When he arrives, he is questioned by United States officials and says that he is a "political prisoner". Montana claims that because he has an American father, he has the right to a green card. However, his request is denied because of a trident-style tattoo on his right hand, which indicates that he was an assassin in prison.

Montana and his friend Manolo "Manny" Ribera are sent to "Freedom town", a refugee camp that holds Cuban immigrants without green cards. After one month in the camp, Frank Lopez, head of a Miami drug cartel, offers to obtain green cards in return for murdering Emilio Rebenga, a one-time Cuban official; Montana stabs Rebenga in the stomach, killing him and earning him a green card. Montana and Ribera set up shop in the cocaine business. After a drug deal gone bad in which one of his crew is dismembered, Lopez hires him and Ribera, and Montana becomes interested in Lopez's girlfriend, Elvira Hancock.

Three months later, Tony pays a visit to his mother, Georgina (whom he calls "Mama") and younger sister, Gina, neither of whom has seen him for five years. Gina is excited to see Tony, but Mama is less than pleased with him, aware of his life of crime. When Tony gives Mama $1,000, she asks him who he killed for the money and what his profession is. Tony tells Mama he works for an anti-Fidel Castro movement and receives "political contributions." Seeing through his lie, Mama angrily berates Tony for his criminal lifestyle, rejects the gift and makes him leave her house. Tony leaves, but Gina runs after him and hugs him, telling him that she has been going to hairdressing school and helping out Mama. Tony says a poor girl like Gina deserves a little fun. He secretly slips her the $1,000 and orders her not to tell Mama about it, only that Mama gets a little bit of it occasionally, through using some of it for grocery shopping or paying a utility bill. Manny, who had been waiting for Tony in the car, is attracted to Gina, but is firmly warned by Tony to stay away from her.

Later, Tony and Omar Suárez go to Cochabamba, Bolivia on Frank's behalf to see Alejandro Sosa, a very wealthy and powerful drug cartel lord. An argument ensues between Tony and Omar when Omar is enraged at Tony trying to negotiate a deal with Sosa without Frank's approval. Sosa has Omar leave, but keeps Tony behind and has Tony watch his men kill Omar from a helicopter for being a police informant. Impressed by Tony's integrity, Sosa takes a liking to Tony and they become business partners, but not before Sosa delivers a dire warning for Tony to never betray him. Upon returning to Miami, Frank is infuriated at Tony for making an unauthorized deal with Sosa and for Omar's demise, and ends his partnership with Tony. At The Babylon nightclub, Tony continues to advance on Elvira, further angering Frank. Mel Bernstein, a corrupt narcotics detective shakes down Tony and informs him that he has evidence linking Tony to the murders of Rebenga and the Colombian drug dealers. Bernstein proposes to "tax" Tony on his transactions in return for police protection and information. Tony is convinced that Frank sent Bernstein, because only Frank would know details about the murders. While talking to Bernstein, Tony sees Gina dancing with a low-level drug dealer. Enraged, Tony beats the dealer and slaps Gina, stopping only after Manny calms him down. Manny drives Gina home and tells her she can do better than those lowlifes and that Tony is only looking out for her. However, when Gina admits an interest in Manny, he freezes, remembering Tony's warning.

Later that night, two men attempt to kill Tony. He escapes and suspects Frank was behind the attempted hit. Tony and Manny track Frank down to his car dealership and is killed by Manny after his admission to the hit. Bernstein is killed shortly after by Tony during an exchange of words. Afterward, Tony goes to Frank's house, telling Elvira that her lover is dead and that he wants her. Over the next year and a half, Tony makes $75 million from the 2,000 kilograms of cocaine he brings to America. He soon makes $10–15 million monthly in profits from his business relationship with Sosa. He marries Elvira and takes over Frank's empire, purchasing a large mansion and other luxuries, such as a pet tiger. Tony also creates many legal businesses as fronts, including a hair salon managed by Gina. However, Tony's rise and empire soon begin to fall. Tony and Elvira become addicted to cocaine. His marriage to Elvira and his friendship with Manny become strained. Jerry, Tony's banker, demands more money, advising it is getting increasingly more difficult to hide drug money. Meanwhile, Manny and Gina begin dating behind her brother's back, fearing Tony's wrath should he find out.

When Tony finds a new banker named Seidelbaum, he turns out to be an undercover policeman and arrests Tony for money laundering and tax evasion. Tony's lawyer, George Sheffield, tells Tony that although he can plea bargain away most of the time he's facing, he'll still end up serving at least three years in prison. Sosa calls Tony down to Bolivia and asks him to help assassinate a Bolivian anti-government activist who threatens to expose Sosa's dealings with Bolivian leaders. In exchange, Sosa will use his contacts in the United States Department of Justice, in Washington, D.C., to keep Tony out of prison, albeit Tony paying back taxes and a large fine. After returning to Miami, Tony, Manny and Elvira attend dinner at a fancy restaurant. While at dinner, Tony initially does not tell Manny about the hit, but puts Manny in charge of operations while Tony goes to New York City. Manny dislikes the idea and tries to talk Tony out of going to New York, citing a bad premonition, but Tony berates Manny for causing Seidelbaum to arrest him. Tony then insults Elvira for not eating her dinner, her excessive use of drugs, her inability to bear children and not doing anything else with her life. Angered, Elvira lashes out at Tony for his drug-dealing and murderous lifestyle, always having his henchmen around, and his inability to be a husband or a father, whilst causing a scene amongst the fellow restaurant patrons. Elvira tells Tony she is leaving him.

Tony and Sosa's associate Alberto "The Shadow" travel to New York to assassinate the activist. Alberto plants a bomb under the activist's car. He is ordered to detonate it before the activist can implicate Sosa's criminal network in a speech at the United Nations Building. On the day set for the assassination, a woman and two children are unexpectedly seen getting into the target's car. Tony objects to carrying out the hit, not wanting to kill anyone other than the intended victim. Alberto reminds Tony of Sosa's demands, and Tony reluctantly begins to tail the target. However, Tony's disgust at possibly killing an innocent woman with her two kids grows while Alberto concentrates on activating the explosive. Before Alberto can detonate the car bomb, Tony angrily shoots and kills Alberto, thus double-crossing Sosa.

Tony returns to Florida to discover Manny and Gina went missing, and receives telephone calls from both Mama and Sosa. Furious, Sosa lambasts Tony for the failed hit as the activist delivered his exposé, then tells Tony the bomb was found, and the activist now has heavy security, making it almost impossible for them to try another hit. Sosa reminds Tony about his initial warning not to betray him and ends his association with Tony. At Mama's house, Mama tells Tony that she cannot find Gina and accuses him of corrupting her. Tony attempts to locate Gina and finds her with Manny. When he sees them wearing bathrobes, Tony assumes they were having sexual intercourse. An enraged and cocaine-fueled Tony shoots and kills Manny before Gina reveals that they were just married and wanted to surprise Tony. Tony and his henchmen take a distraught Gina back to his mansion.

Meanwhile, a large group of assassins sent by Sosa surrounds the mansion. Distraught over killing Manny, Tony sits in his office, and snorts vast quantities of cocaine. The shooters begin killing his guards outside. At the same time, Tony is oblivious to his closed-circuit television cameras (ironically boasting to Manny in an earlier scene that he spent top dollar on the cameras to prevent such an incident). Gina enters Tony's office wielding a Smith & Wesson Model 36, accusing him of his selfishness towards her before shooting him in the leg. This startles one assassin who was lying in the wait. He approaches the room out of nowhere and opens fire on Gina, killing her. Tony then shoots the assassin dead.

Deprived of the element of surprise, Sosa's assassins attack Tony's mansion directly. Tony bursts from his office, wielding an M16 rifle with an M203 grenade launcher attachment. Yelling the iconic line, "Say hello to my little friend!" Tony opens fire on the henchmen, killing numerous, while in turn getting badly wounded by return fire and eventually disarmed. The carnage continues until "The Skull", Sosa's top assassin, sneaks behind Tony and fatally shoots him with a double-barreled shotgun. Tony falls from his balcony into a fountain in the lobby below and floats dead in his bloodied pool beneath a statue of the globe carrying the inscription enlightened in pink neon, "The World Is Yours".

== Video games ==
The 2006 video game Scarface: The World Is Yours is a pseudo-sequel to the 1983 film, which features an alternate ending wherein Tony kills "The Skull" and manages to escape from his mansion before Sosa's men and the police overrun it. While hiding out, Tony curses himself for not listening to others' advice and for killing Manny, and decides to quit cocaine and exact revenge on Sosa. Most of the game revolves around Tony's quest to rebuild his empire in Miami, seizing power from other criminal organizations that have risen to prominence in his absence. By the end, Tony successfully re-establishes himself as the kingpin of Miami, and kills Sosa at his estate in Bolivia. Tony is voiced in the game by André Sogliuzzo, as Al Pacino felt his voice had changed too much since the film's release to properly reprise the role.

Tony also appears in Scarface: Money. Power. Respect., a turn-based strategy game released for the PlayStation Portable and Windows Mobile in 2006.

Tony appears in the video game Payday 2, as a playable character named "Scarface" included in the Scarface Character Pack released in 2016. He is again voiced by André Sogliuzzo. A separate DLC titled "Scarface Heist Pack" contains a heist at Tony's mansion in Miami. In 2020, due to a legal arrangement with Universal Pictures, the Scarface Character Pack was removed from the game and is no longer available for purchase, though the Heist Pack remains available.
