= Scarface (1983 film) =

1983 American film by Brian De Palma

- Theatrical release poster
- Directed by: Brian De Palma
- Screenplay by: Oliver Stone
- Based on: Scarface (1930 novel) by Armitage Trail; Scarface (Note: Neither the novel nor the 1932 film are credited on-screen. The end credits include a dedication to Howard Hawks and Ben Hecht, director and co-screenwriter respectively, of the 1932 film.) (1932 film) by W. R. Burnett Ben Hecht John Lee Mahin Seton I. Miller
- Produced by: Martin Bregman
- Starring: Al Pacino
- Cinematography: John A. Alonzo
- Edited by: Jerry Greenberg; David Ray
- Music by: Giorgio Moroder
- Production companies: Universal Pictures; Martin Bregman Productions
- Distributed by: Universal Pictures
- Release dates: December 1, 1983 (New York City premiere); December 9, 1983 (United States)
- Running time: 170 minutes
- Country: United States
- Language: English
- Budget: $23.5–37 million
- Box office: $66.4 million

Scarface is a 1983 American epic crime drama film directed by Brian De Palma from a screenplay by Oliver Stone. It is loosely based on the 1930 novel by Armitage Trail and is a remake of the 1932 film of the same name directed by Howard Hawks. The film stars an ensemble cast led by Al Pacino, who stars as Cuban refugee Tony Montana. In the film, Montana arrives in Miami during the Mariel boatlift and becomes a powerful drug lord.

Pacino worked with producer Martin Bregman to develop the project. Bregman and Sidney Lumet both conceived the idea of setting the story during the boatlift. Lumet was initially hired to direct the film but left, feeling that it was too violent and wanted it to be more of a political film. De Palma replaced Lumet as director and Bregman hired Stone to write the script. Stone, who had been struggling with his own cocaine addiction at the time, wrote the script in Paris. Several actresses were considered for playing Elvira Hancock before Michelle Pfeiffer — then almost Glenn Close — was chosen for the role; Pacino and De Palma had argued against her casting, but Bregman fought for her inclusion. The film was initially going to be entirely shot in Miami, but the Cuban community denied requests to film there, feeling that the script portrayed them in a bad light. Filming took place from November 1982 to May 1983 in Los Angeles and two weeks in Miami. The film's soundtrack and score was composed by Giorgio Moroder.

Scarface premiered in New York City on December 1, 1983, and was released on December 9 by Universal Pictures. The film was a commercial success, grossing $66 million. Initial critical response was negative due to its extreme violence and depiction of stereotypes. However, in the years that followed, some critics have reappraised it, and it is now considered one of the best gangster films. Screenwriters and directors such as Martin Scorsese have praised the film, and it has been referenced extensively in pop culture, especially in hip-hop culture, as well as comic books, television programs and video games. The film is regarded as a cult classic.

== Plot ==
In 1980, ex-convict Cuban refugee Tony Montana arrives in Miami as part of the Mariel boatlift with his friend Manny Ribera and their companions, Angel and Chi-Chi. Miami drug lord Frank Lopez arranges green cards for them in exchange for murdering a former henchman of Fidel Castro. Dissatisfied with their jobs as restaurant dishwashers, Tony and Manny meet with Frank's right-hand man, Omar Suarez, who sends the four to purchase cocaine from Colombian dealers. Tony is greeted cordially by Hector the Toad and Marta, but the deal soon turns sour. Tony and Angel are taken at gunpoint; Tony is forced to watch as Angel is slaughtered with a chainsaw, before Manny and Chi-Chi rescue him. They kill the dealers and insist to Omar that they deliver the drugs and money to Frank in person, suspecting Omar set them up.

Tony and Manny begin working for Frank while Tony is attracted to Frank's trophy wife, Elvira Hancock. Tony visits his mother, and sister Gina. Tony gives his mother $1,000, claiming he earns money as a political organizer. Tony's mother is angered by his lie, berates Tony for his criminal lifestyle, and kicks him out. Gina runs outside to reassure Tony, and he lets Gina keep the money and walk back inside. Manny expresses attraction towards Gina, but Tony sternly warns Manny to stay away from her.

Frank sends Tony and Omar to Bolivia to meet cocaine kingpin Alejandro Sosa. Omar is angered when Tony seeks to negotiate a large deal without Frank's approval. Tony eats one of the lemons from the bowl. Sosa sends Omar off but keeps Tony behind to watch his men hang Omar from a helicopter, and tells Tony that Omar is a police informant and that Frank has poor judgment for trusting him. Tony says he never trusted Omar. Sosa takes a liking to Tony for his integrity and agrees to the deal, but not before delivering Tony a stern warning to never double-cross him.

Back in Miami, Frank is furious at Tony for his unauthorized deal with Sosa and doubts that Omar was a stoolie. He continues to employ Tony, and Tony brings in a lot of business. Tony continues flirting with Elvira, further infuriating Frank. Mel Bernstein, a corrupt detective on Frank's payroll, attempts to extort Tony for police protection. Tony confronts Gina upon finding her making out with a man in a club bathroom. At the club, hitmen hired by Frank seek to assassinate Tony, who escapes with minor wounds, but Octavio the Clown is killed in the crossfire. He later confronts Frank and Mel about the attack, forcing Frank to confess and plead for his life. Tony orders Manny to shoot Frank, then he kills Mel himself. Tony then takes complete control of Frank's drug operation and assets, making everything his own.

A musical montage ensues, to the tune of Scarface (Push It to the Limit) Tony marries Elvira and becomes the distributor of Sosa's cocaine. He buys a tiger that he keeps chained up in the yard. This makes Tony one of the most powerful drug lords in Miami, overseeing his rapidly growing drug empire from a large, heavily guarded estate. However all is not well, as Elvira spirals into drug and alcohol abuse.

As money pours in, Tony gripes about the high rate his banker is charging for money laundering. The banker reassures him that his professional service is worth paying for because it is the safest option.

Tony takes a bath in a very large bathtub while watching television. They discuss the money situation and Manny's plan to check out a new option named Seidelbaum. Elvira sits nearby and complains that all they ever do is curse and talk about money. Tony has a happy moment watching flamingos on television, saying, "Fly, pelican!"

In 1983, a sting operation by federal agents sees Tony charged with tax evasion and facing prison time. Tony has an excellent lawyer, but he seems to think this charge will stick. Tax evasion was the same prosecutorial tactic that imprisoned Al Capone, the inspiration for Scarface.

Sosa offers to keep Tony out of prison via his government connections if Tony kills a journalist about to expose Sosa during a speech to the United Nations. During a restaurant dinner a drunken Tony has an existential crisis and lashes out. He blames Manny for unwittingly introducing him to the undercover agents and calls Elvira an infertile junkie, prompting Elvira to call out his criminality to the other patrons and leave him.

Tony then travels to New York City. Sosa's henchman, Alberto, puts a radio-controlled bomb under the journalist's car, but Tony tries to cancel the hit upon seeing the journalist is accompanied by his wife and children. Alberto refuses and Tony kills him before he can detonate the bomb. A furious Sosa vows revenge for Tony allowing the journalist to deliver the exposé.

At his mother's behest, Tony, high on cocaine, tracks down Gina and finds her with Manny. Tony shoots Manny dead before learning Gina has just married him. Tony takes Gina to his estate and begins a cocaine binge in his office. Gina accuses him of wanting her for himself. She shoots and wounds him, and is killed by one of Sosa's men whom Tony kills in return. Sosa's men invade the grounds and kill Tony's guards, including Ernie, Nick the Pig, and Chi-Chi. Tony takes an AR-15 rifle with a grenade launcher to the invaders, killing many, but suffering gunshot wounds. He taunts his attackers until an assassin shoots him in the back with a shotgun. Tony's body falls from the balcony into the pool, near the base of a globe with the motto "The World Is Yours".

== Cast ==
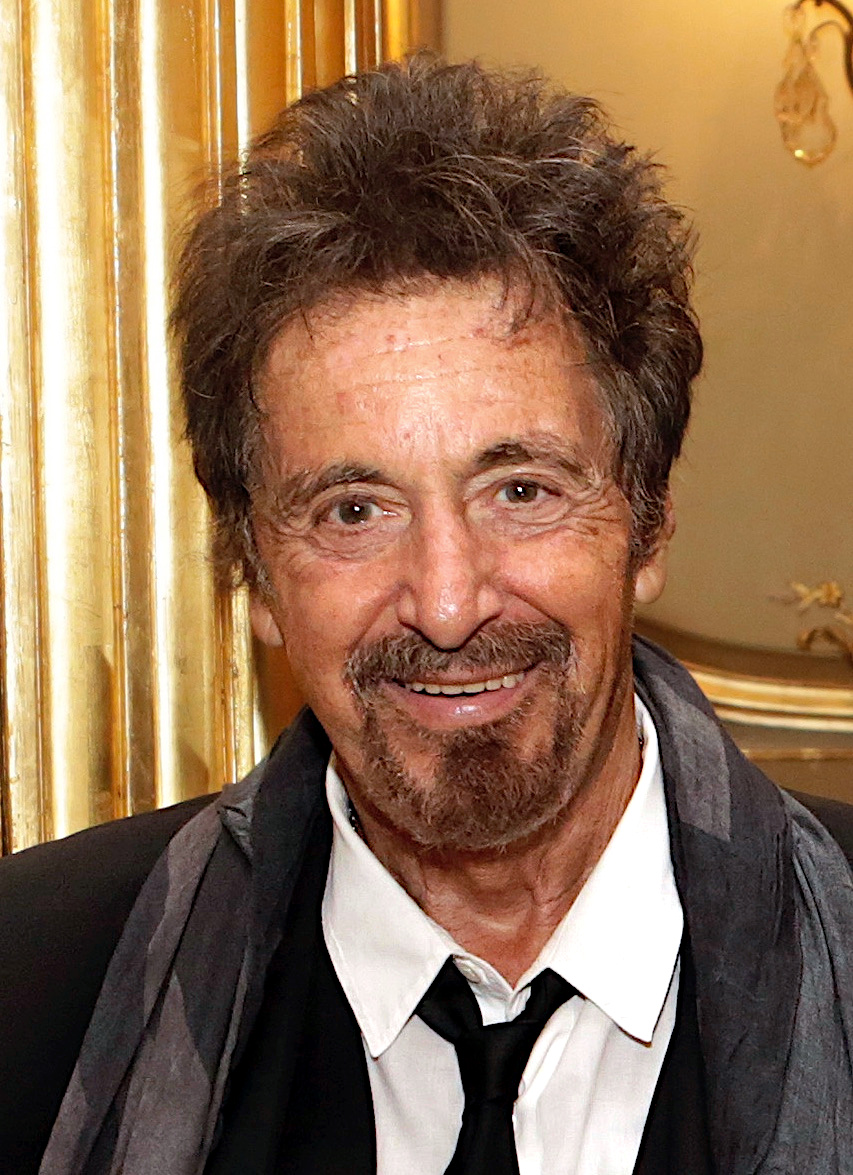
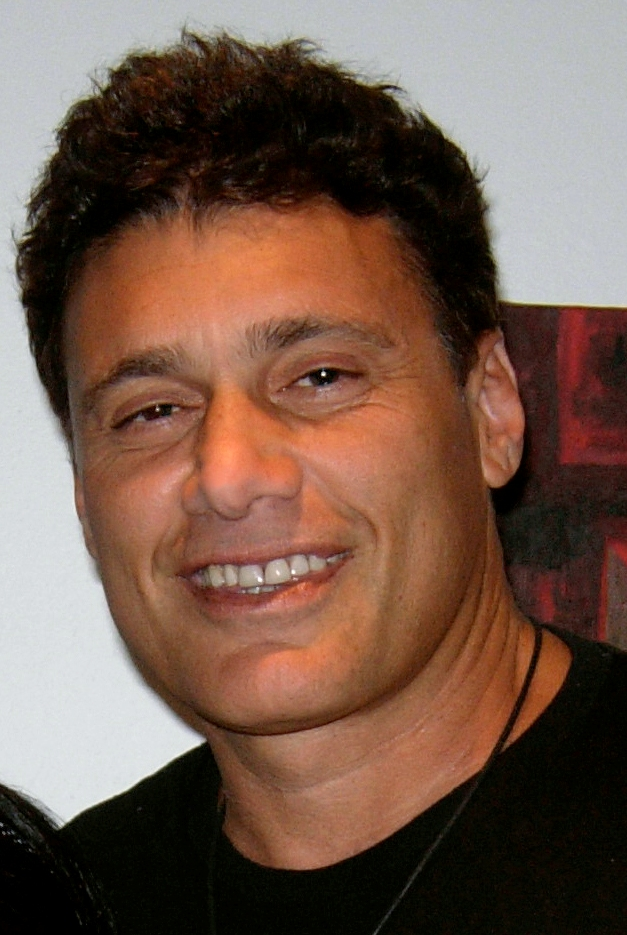
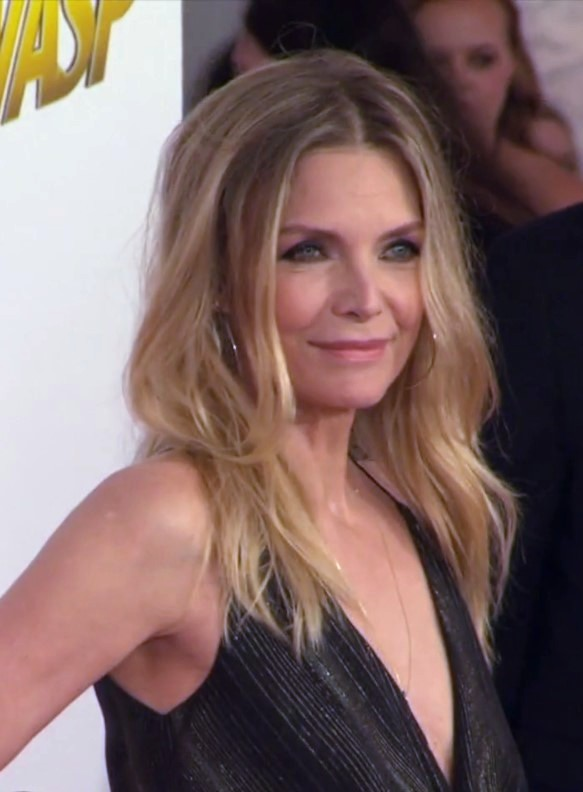
(Left to right) Al Pacino (pictured in 2016), Steven Bauer (2008), and Michelle Pfeiffer (2018)
- Al Pacino as Tony Montana: a Cuban-born refugee who becomes the most powerful drug lord in Miami
- Steven Bauer as Manolo "Manny" Ribera: Tony's best friend and right-hand man
- Michelle Pfeiffer as Elvira Hancock: Frank Lopez's trophy wife, who later marries Tony Montana
- Mary Elizabeth Mastrantonio as Gina Montana: Tony's younger sister
- Robert Loggia as Frank Lopez: a Miami drug lord who mentors Tony and Manny
- Míriam Colón as Georgina Montana: Tony's disapproving mother
- F. Murray Abraham as Omar Suarez: Frank's righthand man who is skeptical of Tony
- Paul Shenar as Alejandro Sosa: a Bolivian drug lord and supplier for Tony
- Harris Yulin as Mel Bernstein: a corrupt Miami Police Detective on Frank's payroll
- Ángel Salazar as Chi-Chi: a friend and enforcer of Tony
- Arnaldo Santana as Ernie: a bodyguard of Frank's, who later works for Tony
- Pepe Serna as Angel Fernandez: a friend of Tony
- Michael P. Moran as Nick the Pig: an underling of Tony
- Al Israel as Hector the Toad: a Colombian drug trafficker
- Dennis Holahan as Jerry: a banker who is used by Tony to launder his money
- Mark Margolis as Alberto: a henchman of Sosa
- Michael Alldredge as George Sheffield: Tony's lawyer
- Ted Beniades as Seidelbaum, an undercover police officer
- Geno Silva as "The Skull", a sicario and hitman for Sosa

Other cast members include Richard Belzer as the Babylon Club M.C., Albert Carrier as Pedro Quinn, a sugar mogul working with Sosa; Victor Millan as Ariel Blayer, a Bolivian politician working with Sosa; Roberto Contreras as Emilio Rebenga, a Cuban emigre Montana assassinates; and Gregg Henry as Charles Goodson, an American associate of Sosa's.

De Palma regulars Charles Durning and Dennis Franz provided uncredited voiceover dubbing of the Immigration and Naturalization Service officers who interrogate Montana in the opening scene, played on-screen by Garnett Smith, Tony Perez and John Brandon. Lana Clarkson, Angela Aames, Ava Lazar, Margaret Michaels and Katt Shea appear as patrons at the Babylon Club. Teen model Tammy Lynn Leppert appears as the young woman distracting the lookout car during the chainsaw scene. News reporter Mario Machado appears as himself.

== Production ==
=== Development ===
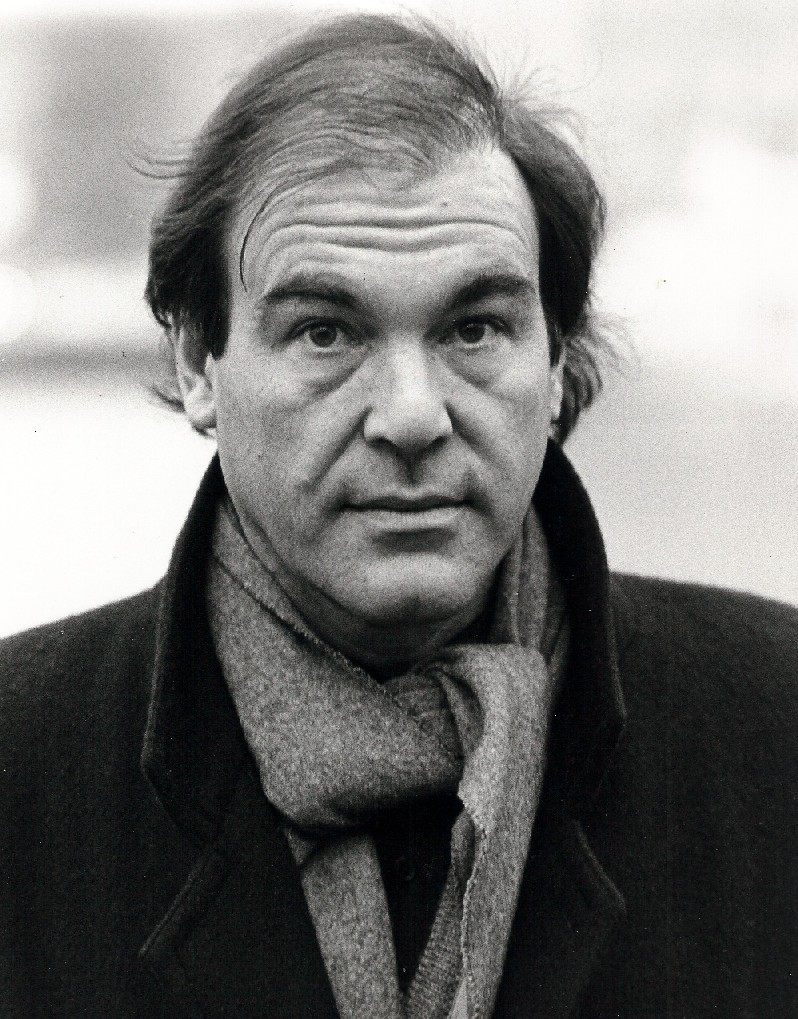
Oliver Stone (pictured in 1987) wrote the script for Scarface while struggling with his own addiction to cocaine.

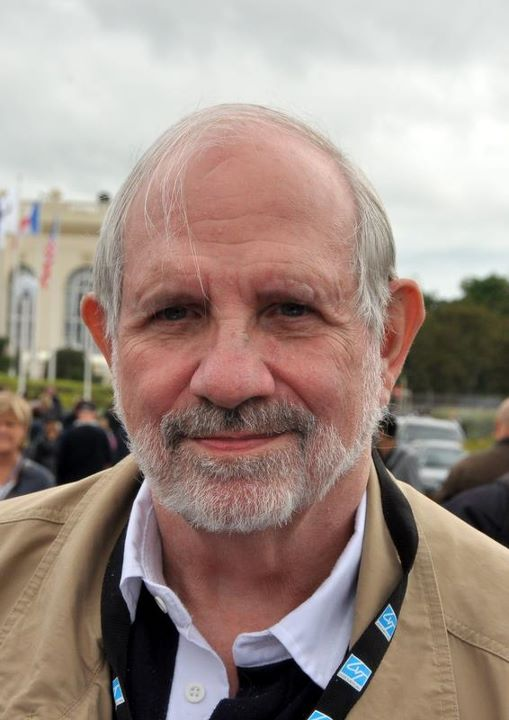
Brian De Palma (pictured in 2011), director of the film

Scarface began development after Al Pacino saw the 1932 film at the Tiffany Theater while in Los Angeles. He later called his manager, producer Martin Bregman, and informed him of his belief in the potential for a remake of that film. Pacino originally wanted to retain the period piece aspect, but realized that because of its melodramatic nature, it would be difficult to accomplish. Sidney Lumet became attached as the director, developing the idea for Tony Montana to be a Cuban arriving in the United States during the Mariel boatlift.

Bregman and Lumet's creative differences resulted in Lumet dropping out of the project. Lumet had wanted to make a more political story that focused on blaming the current presidential administration for the influx of cocaine into the United States, but Bregman disagreed. Bregman replaced him with Brian De Palma, and hired writer Oliver Stone; Stone had seen the original 1932 Scarface and had not enjoyed it, so he initially rejected the offer.

After he talked with Lumet, however, he was convinced to accept the offer because they agreed to transform the film from a period piece to a contemporary film. "Sidney had a great idea to take the 1930s American prohibition gangster movie and make it into a modern immigrant gangster movie dealing with the same problems that we had then, that we're prohibiting drugs instead of alcohol. There's a prohibition against drugs that's created the same criminal class as (prohibition of alcohol) created the Mafia". In the book The Oliver Stone Experience, Stone writes: "I didn't want to do an Italian Mafia movie ... We'd had dozens of these things. But then Bregman came to me and said, Sidney has a great idea — he wants to do it as a Marielito picture in Miami. I said, That's interesting! Sidney's idea was a good one."

Stone researched the script while battling his own cocaine addiction. He and Bregman performed their own research, traveling to Miami, Florida, where they were given access to records from the U.S. Attorney's Office and the Organized Crime Bureau. Stone moved to Paris to write the script, believing that he could not break his addiction while in the United States, stating in a 2003 interview that he was completely off drugs at the time, "because I don't think cocaine helps writing. It's very destructive to the brain cells."

Among other changes to the original story was the addition of the character Alejandro Sosa. Stone patterned the character after Roberto Suárez Gómez, a Bolivian drug lord nicknamed the "King of Cocaine".

=== Casting ===
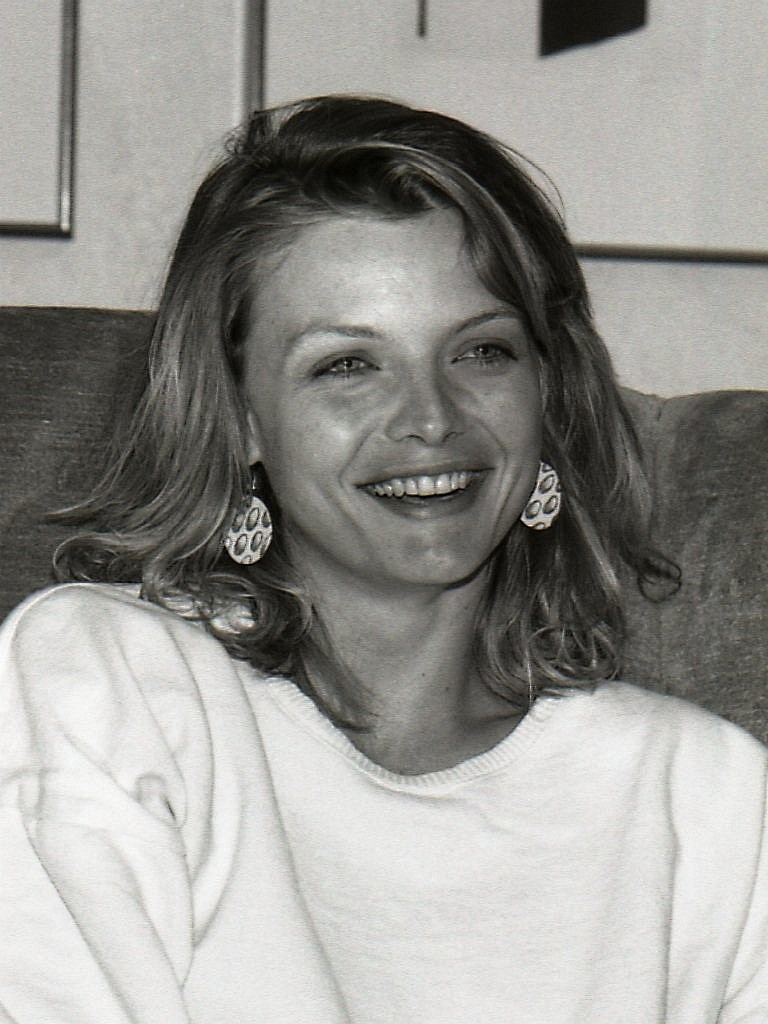
Michelle Pfeiffer was an almost unknown actress when she appeared in Scarface, and both star Al Pacino and director Brian De Palma initially argued against her casting.

Pacino worked with experts in knife combat, trainers and boxer Roberto Durán to attain the body type that he wanted for the role. Durán also helped inspire the character, who had "a certain lion in him", according to Pacino. Sophie Zawistoska, Meryl Streep's immigrant character in Sophie's Choice (1982) also influenced Pacino's portrayal of Tony Montana. Steven Bauer and a dialect coach helped him learn aspects of the Cuban Spanish language and pronunciation.

Michelle Pfeiffer was an unknown actress at the time, known primarily for her role in Grease 2; both Pacino and De Palma had argued against her casting, but Bregman fought for her inclusion. Glenn Close was the original choice for the role, while others were also considered, including Nancy Allen, Geena Davis, Carrie Fisher, Kelly McGillis, Rosanna Arquette, Melanie Griffith, Kim Basinger, Brooke Shields, Sharon Stone and Sigourney Weaver.

Bauer got his role without auditioning. During the audition process, casting director Alixe Gordin saw Bauer and instantly noted that he was right for the role of Manolo "Manny" Ribera, a judgment with which both De Palma and Bregman agreed. He was the only actual Cuban in the principal cast. John Travolta was considered for the role.

=== Filming ===
The picture was shot over 24 weeks from November 22, 1982, to May 6, 1983. Although the film is set in Miami, the Miami Tourist Board declined requests to film there, fearing that the film's themes of drugs and gangsters would deter tourism. Instead, much of the film was shot in Los Angeles. In April 1983, however, one scene was shot at Miami's Fontainebleau Miami Beach. The chainsaw scene was filmed on Miami Beach's Ocean Drive. A second unit team headed by David Hans Dreyfuss shot for one day at Coronado Beach in San Diego, California. Tony's opulent mansion was El Fureidis, a Roman-styled mansion near Santa Barbara, California.

The production was halted twice for severe weather events in California. During production in March, Pacino burned his left hand on the muzzle of the gun that had been fired when he tripped during a fight scene. Production was shut down for more than a week while Pacino recovered. A premature bomb explosion also injured two stuntmen during a scene shot in his absence. The gunfight scene at the end of the film includes a single camera shot directed by Steven Spielberg, who was visiting the set at the time. Powdered baby laxative was used as the fake substance for cocaine in the film. The special effects were performed by Ken Pepiot and Stan Parks. According to De Palma, he arranged for Stone to leave the set because the latter was getting in the way of the former's direction by "talking to the actors on the set".

=== Rating ===
Less than two months before the film's release, on October 28, 1983, Scarface was given an X rating by the MPAA for "excessive and cumulative violence and for language". De Palma had already re-cut the film three times by that point; De Palma stated: "I said I've had it with these people, I'm not taking any more out." Bregman told The New York Times that "we have been designated as a pornographic film ... We'll accept the X rating and appeal". Universal would not release the film with an X rating due to the porn perception and the reduction of ticket sales being from ticket buyers, most newspapers, TV and radio stations, who would not run ads for an X-rated film.

On November 8, an appeal board composed of 20 theater owners, studio executives and independent distributors overturned the decision 17 to 3 in favor of an R rating—more than the two-thirds required. De Palma believed that the changes were minor enough to be unnoticeable and requested that the original cut of the film be released with the rating. When the MPAA refused, De Palma released the film uncut anyway, admitting to it only months after the film's release.

=== Music ===
Instead of using popular music from the period in which the film is set, the music in Scarface was produced by Academy Award-winning Italian record producer Giorgio Moroder. Reflecting Moroder's style, the soundtrack consists mostly of synthesized new wave and electronic music. De Palma has stated that he has repeatedly denied Universal's requests to re-release the film with "a rap score" because he thinks that Moroder's score is perfect. In June 2022, the complete score and soundtrack was released by La-La Land Records.

== Release ==
=== Theatrical ===
Scarface premiered on December 1, 1983, in New York City, where it was initially greeted with mixed reaction. The film's two stars, Al Pacino and Steven Bauer, were joined in attendance by Burt and Diane Lane, Melanie Griffith, Raquel Welch, Joan Collins, her boyfriend Peter Holm and Eddie Murphy, among others. It was given a wide release on December 9.

=== Home media ===
Scarface was initially released by MCA Home Video on VHS, CED Videodisc, LaserDisc and Beta in summer 1984—a two-tape set in 1.33:1 pan and scan ratio—and quickly became a bestseller, becoming the first to sell 100,000 copies at a retail price of $79.95. A VHS formatted in the film's theatrical 2.35:1 widescreen aspect ratio followed in 1998 to coincide with the special edition DVD release. The last VHS release was in 2003 to counterpart the 20th anniversary edition DVD. The 2003 DVD was remastered and re-released through Universal Records.

The commercial television version of Scarface premiered on ABC on January 7, 1989. 32 minutes of violence, profanity and sex were removed, as well as much of the dialogue, including the constant use of the word "fuck", which was muted after the beginning of "f-" or replaced with less offensive alternatives.

The film received a North American DVD release on the film's fifteenth anniversary in 1998 for the Signature Collection LaserDisc release of the film, but recycled onto DVD, featuring a non-anamorphic widescreen transfer, a "Making of" documentary, outtakes, trailers, a photo gallery, production notes and cast and crew biographies. This release was not successful, and many fans and reviewers complained about its unwatchable video transfer and muddled sound, describing it as "one of the worst big studio releases out there". The 20th Anniversary edition was released on DVD and VHS in 2003, with the DVD selling more than 2 million units in its first week and becoming the best-selling R-rated DVD title.

In 2003, Music Inspired by Scarface, a Def Jam Recordings compilation album, featured songs by various hip-hop artists which either draw direct inspiration from the film, or contain subject matter that can relate to the film.

Scarface was released on Blu-ray on September 6, 2011, in a two-disc, limited edition, steelbox package. The set was criticized for its poor picture quality due to usage of an old master created from the DVD release. Disc two is a DVD of the 1932 Scarface, featuring a TCM-produced introduction by Robert Osborne and an alternate ending. Bonus features include The Making of Scarface documentary, and a new retrospective documentary: The Scarface Phenomenon.

A special gift set, limited to 1,000 copies, features the Blu-ray set housed in a cigar humidor, designed by humidor craftsman Daniel Marshall. The humidor box set retailed at $999.99.

A standard 4K Ultra HD Blu-ray and limited edition set were released on October 15, 2019. The limited edition set contains a specially-made statue, a newly remastered transfer and, for the first time on Blu-ray, the 1932 original. There is also a standard set that contains the same 4K transfer and a remastered 1080p disk but does not include the 1932 version. A month later on November 19, the 1932 original was given its own individual release. The 4K release ports over all of the old special features and adds one new one, which is a reunion special in tribute to the 35th anniversary of the movie's release.

In the United States, the film sold 3.7 million DVD units for $78.2 million in 2003, and 285,916 Blu-ray units for $6,103,545 as of 2020, totaling 3,985,916 DVD and Blu-ray units sold for $84,303,545 as of 2020.

== Reception ==
=== Box office ===
Scarface was released theatrically in North America on December 9, 1983. The film earned $4.5 million from 996 theaters during its opening weekend, an average of $4,616 per theater, and ranking as the second-highest-grossing film of the weekend behind Sudden Impact ($9.6 million), which debuted the same weekend. It went on to earn $45.2 million in North America and $20.5 million from other markets, for a total of $65.7 million.

This figure made Scarface the 16th highest-grossing film of 1983, and seventh highest grossing R-rated film in North America for 1983. It has since been given three re-releases in 2003, which featured a remastered film for the film's 20th anniversary, 2012 and 2014, bringing the total earned to $45.4 million domestically, for a total of $66 million worldwide. Following subsequent re-releases, the film has grossed over $66.4 million.

In terms of box-office admissions, the film sold 14,197,700 tickets in the United States and Spain, 1,067,544 tickets in France and Italy, 250,746 tickets in South Korea, and 195,872 tickets in Germany, for a total of 15,711,862 tickets sold in these territories.

=== Critical response ===
Critics were generally negative about Scarface when it was originally released. The film was noted for its violence and profanity. New York magazine called it an empty, bullying, overblown B-movie.

Writers Kurt Vonnegut and John Irving both stated that they walked out after the chainsaw scene. At the middle of the film, Martin Scorsese reportedly said to Bauer, "You guys are great – but be prepared, because they're going to hate it in Hollywood ... because it's about them."

In his review for Newsweek, David Ansen wrote, "If Scarface makes you shudder, it's from what you think you see and from the accumulated tension of this feral landscape. It's a grand, shallow, decadent entertainment, which like all good Hollywood gangster movies delivers the punch and counterpunch of glamour and disgust."

Jay Scott wrote in his review for The Globe and Mail, "For a while, Al Pacino is hypnotic as Montana. But the effort expended on the flawless Cuban accent and the attempts to flesh out a character cut from inch-thick cardboard are hopeless."

In his review for The Washington Post, Gary Arnold wrote, "A movie that appeared intent on revealing an alarmingly contemporary criminal subculture gradually reverts to underworld cliche, covering its derivative tracks with outrageous decor and an apocalyptic, production number finale, ingeniously choreographed to leave the antihero floating face down in a literal bloodbath."

Roger Ebert of the Chicago Sun-Times rated it four stars out of four in his 1983 review, and later added it to his The Great Movies list. Ebert wrote, "DePalma and his writer, Oliver Stone, have created a gallery of specific individuals, and one of the fascinations of the movie is that we aren't watching crime-movie clichés, we're watching people who are criminals."

Vincent Canby praised the film in The New York Times, "The dominant mood of the film is... bleak and futile: what goes up must always come down. When it comes down in Scarface, the crash is as terrifying as it is vivid and arresting."

Leonard Maltin was among the critics who held a negative opinion of Scarface. He gave the film 1½ stars out of four, stating that Scarface "wallows in excess and unpleasantness for nearly three hours, and offers no new insights except that crime doesn't pay. At least the 1932 movie moved." Maltin included an addendum to his review in later editions of his annual movie guide, stating his surprise with the film's newfound popularity as a cult classic.

On review aggregator Rotten Tomatoes, the film holds a 78% approval rating based on 79 reviews, with an average rating of 7.7/10. The website's consensus reads: "Director Brian De Palma and star Al Pacino take it to the limit in this stylized, ultra-violent and eminently quotable gangster epic that walks a thin white line between moral drama and celebratory excess." Metacritic, which uses a weighted average, assigned the film a score of 65 out of 100, based on reviews from 9 critics, indicating "generally favorable" reviews.

=== Depiction of stereotypes ===
During filming, some Cubans objected to the film's Cuban characters being portrayed as criminals by mostly non-Cuban actors. The film features a disclaimer following its credits, stating in red, all-cap lettering, "Scarface is a fictional account of the activities of a small group of ruthless criminals. The characters do not represent the Cuban/American community and it would be erroneous and unfair to suggest that they do. The vast majority of Cuban/Americans have demonstrated a dedication, vitality and enterprise that has enriched the American scene."

In 2008, Damarys Ocaña of The Guardian wrote that the film reinforces stereotypes of Marielito Cubans, as it exaggerates the number of criminals in the Mariel boatlift. She also called Pacino's portrayal of a Cuban-American as having a "ridiculous accent and overacting". According to a 1985 Sun Sentinel magazine article, it was rumored that, of the approximate 125,000 refugees that entered the United States on the boatlift, around 16,000 to 20,000 were estimated to be criminals, and around 350 to 400 Mariel Cubans were reported to inhabit Dade County jails on a typical day. However, in a New York Daily News editorial following the film's release, Miguel Perez charged, "The movie fails to say that even among those Marielitos who had criminal records, there were thousands whose offenses were so minor that they would not be considered criminals here, and thousands of others whose 'criminal record' was based on their opposition to the Communist regime."

Demetrio Perez, the city commissioner of Miami, led the charge against the film. Estimates assert that the Mariel refugee population included only 2,700 hardened criminals, over a thousand of whom were deported back to Cuba by the U.S. government. In The Oliver Stone Experience, Stone commented, "Well, Tony Montana was a gangster ... His mother and his sister represent the clean-cut Cuban community. His mother scolds him: You're a scumbag, get out of my house! You're ruining your sister! So there is a strong morality in the movie. I knew about the criticisms even in advance, that Cubans were not like that. But I'm sorry: A lot of Cubans did become Marielitos. If I'd done it about Colombians, they would've said the same thing: 'You're anti-Colombian'."

=== Accolades ===
| Award | Category | Subject | Result | Ref |
|---|---|---|---|---|
| 41st Golden Globe Awards | Best Actor – Motion Picture Drama | Al Pacino | Nominated | |
| 41st Golden Globe Awards | Best Supporting Actor – Motion Picture | Steven Bauer | Nominated | |
| 41st Golden Globe Awards | Best Original Score | Giorgio Moroder | Nominated | |
| 31st Motion Picture Sound Editors awards | Golden Reel Award for Best Sound Editing – Sound Effects | Maurice Schell | Nominated | |
| 4th Golden Raspberry Awards | Worst Director | Brian De Palma | Nominated | |
| 8th Golden Satellite Awards | Best Classic DVD Release | | Nominated | |

The film is recognized by American Film Institute in these lists:

- 2003: AFI's 100 Years...100 Heroes & Villains:
  - Tony Montana – Nominated Villain
- 2005: AFI's 100 Years...100 Movie Quotes:
  - Tony Montana: "Say "hello" to my little friend!" – #61
- 2008: AFI's 10 Top 10:
  - No. 10 Gangster Film

Notably, Scarface is the only remake to appear in the same AFI 10 Top 10 list as the original film. It is No. 10 while the 1932 original is No. 6.

== Legacy ==
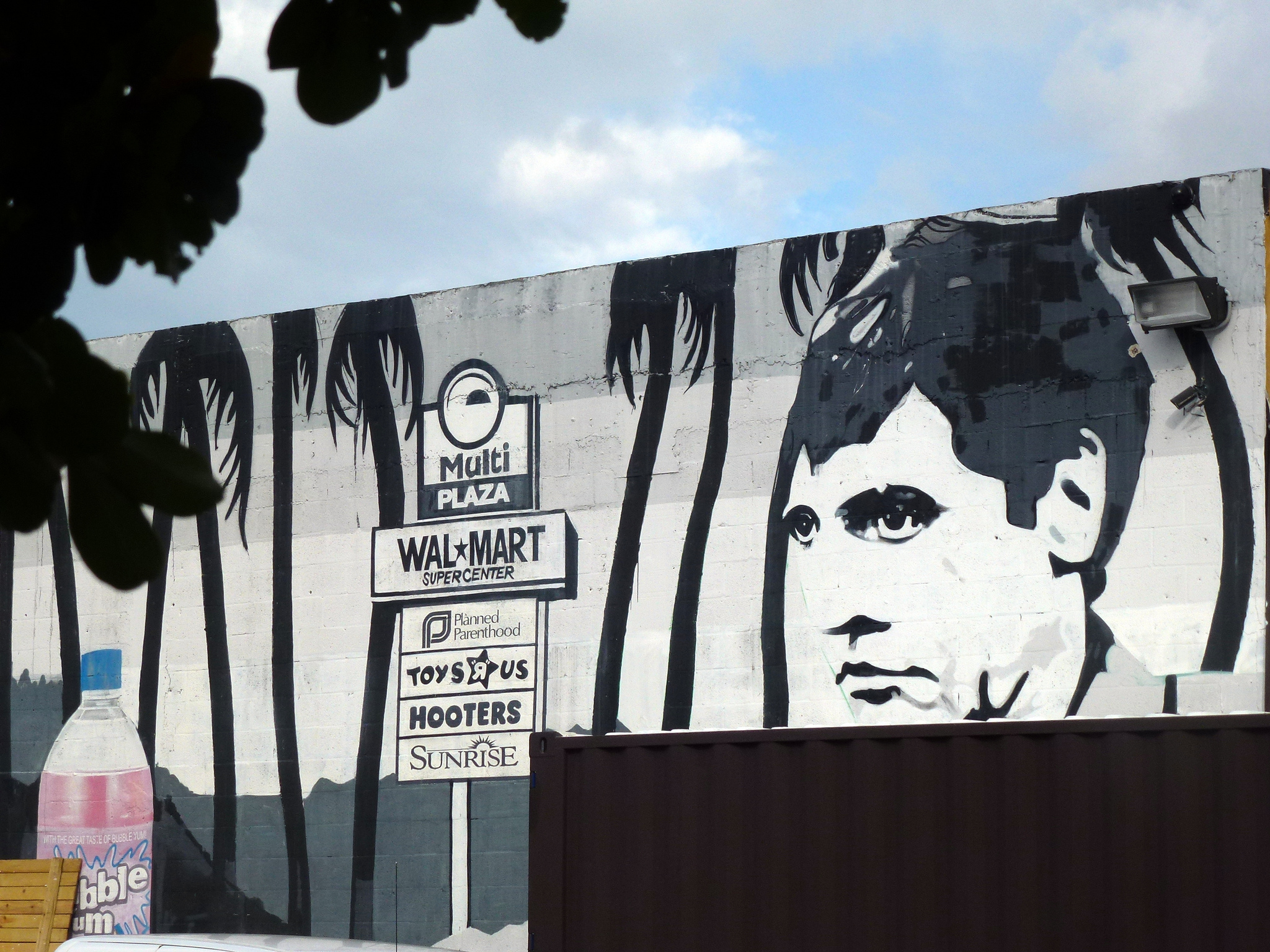
Mural of Pacino's "Tony Montana" character in Wynwood in 2012

=== Film industry ===
Pacino was already an established successful actor, but Scarface helped launch Pfeiffer's and Mary Elizabeth Mastrantonio's careers; both were relatively unknown before, but went on to individual successes. Entertainment Weekly ranked the film #8 on their list of "The Top 50 Cult Films", and Empire magazine placed it among the top 500 films of all time, at #284. In 2009, Total Film listed it at number 9 on their list of the 30 Greatest Gangster movies. Scarface was among the earliest films in which the expletive "fuck" is used persistently; 226 times total. The company set up by former Iraqi president Saddam Hussein to launder money was named Montana Management after Tony Montana's money-laundering operation in the film.

=== Relatability to mobsters ===
During a 2012 police raid of Italian Mafia gangster Carlo Padovani's Naples home, a life-sized porcelain bust of Tony Montana was found. Leading figures in the Italian Mafia were said to admire the Scarface movie and Tony Montana, further confirming that the film depicts the life of real drug lords. Another Naples drug lord, Walter Schiavone, instructed to have an exact replica of Tony Montana's Miami mansion built in Naples, Italy.

=== Influence in hip-hop ===
The release of Scarface coincided with the rise of hip-hop, and the film has had a lasting influence on hip-hop music artists. The beginning of the 1996 music video for the song "2 of Amerikaz Most Wanted" by rapper 2Pac featuring Snoop Dogg is a reference to a scene from the movie. Rapper Tony Yayo's stage name is derived from the movie, referencing Tony Montana's first name and a moment in the movie where Tony tells Chi-Chi (Ángel Salazar) to "get the yeyo". American rapper Nas compared himself to Tony Montana and compared rapper Jay-Z to Manolo, both characters from Scarface, on Nas's track "Last Real Nigga Alive" from his 2002 album God's Son, during the time of the high-profile feud between the two. Rapper AZ, Nas's close associate has referred himself as SOSA over the years, referencing Paul Shenar's character.

In 2003, hip-hop record label Def Jam Recordings released a compilation album called Music Inspired by Scarface. The compilation album contains rap music directly inspired by the movie or has lyrical content that can relate to the film. Rapper Cuban Link released "Scarface 2" in 2002, which was featured on his Broken Chains mixtape. Cuban has frequently sampled and mentioned Scarface into his music in songs like "Off the Books" (with The Beatnuts and Big Pun), "Toe to Toe" (featuring Big Pun), "Shakedown", "Quiet Storm" and various of his other tracks.

Rapper Chief Keef uses the nickname "Sosa" after Alejandro Sosa. In The Lonely Island parody hip-hop 2011 song "Jack Sparrow", a rap song from their album Turtleneck & Chain intended to be about clubbing is ruined by Michael Bolton singing about various films, including Scarface. In 2011, rapper Future released the gold-certified "Tony Montana" on his album Pluto. South-Korean rapper and member of group BTS, Agust D also compared himself to Tony Montana and made multiple references to the movie in his track "Tony Montana" (featuring Yankie) from his 2016 debut album, Agust D. Nicki Minaj's 2018 song "Chun-Li" from her album Queen contains lines that appear to be reworked Tony Montana's quotes, such as "They painting me out to be the bad guy/ Well, it's the last time you gonna see a bad guy/ do the rap game like me" and "They need rappers like me/ they need rappers like me!" In 2023, Drake sampled a monologue by Pacino in the film and included it on the song "Daylight" from his album For All the Dogs.

=== Cultural references ===
The video for Mötley Crüe's song "Dr. Feelgood" echoes several elements of the film (the end of the video features a bloodless version of the climatic shootout where Tony Montana is killed) and the song itself describes a young man who rises to great power in the drug trade and then loses it all. In 1992, professional wrestler Scott Hall joined the World Wrestling Federation (WWF, now WWE) as Razor Ramon, a shady and stylish Cuban American bully from Miami. The character was modeled on the characters Tony Montana and Manny Ribera from Scarface. Ramon's nickname (The Bad Guy) and catchphrase ("Say hello to The Bad Guy") derive from Montana's quotes: "Say hello to my little friend" and "Say goodnight to the bad guy". Later in his career, Hall claimed that he pitched the idea of a Scarface-like character during a meeting with Vince McMahon and Pat Patterson as a joke.

On The Mountain Goats 2012 album Transcendental Youth, the song "The Diaz Brothers" is themed around minor characters who are killed in Scarface. The inspiration for the song arose while lead singer John Darnielle was watching the film and his infant son smiled at the mention of the Diaz Brothers.

Scarface is among the films that served as inspiration for the 2002 video game Grand Theft Auto: Vice City, which took place in a representation of 1980s Miami and featured a recreation of Montana's mansion. The video game series Yakuza takes many influences from the film. Among these are Kazuma Kiryu's various outfits that bear similarities to those worn by Tony Montana. In the animated series The Batman, the character of the Ventriloquist (Dan Castellaneta) uses a dummy named Scarface wearing an outfit modeled after Montana's. Metric's 2009 song "Gold Guns Girls" from the album Fantasies was inspired by the film. In 2010, artist James Georgopoulos included the screen-used guns from Scarface in his popular Guns of Cinema series. Bob Dylan's 2020 song "My Own Version of You" from his album Rough and Rowdy Ways references the film with the line, "I'll take the Scarface Pacino and the Godfather Brando / Mix 'em up in a tank and get a robot commando."

== In other media ==
Scarface received its own tie-in video games with the 2006 releases of Scarface: The World Is Yours for the PlayStation 2, Xbox, and Windows, and Scarface: Money. Power. Respect. for the PlayStation Portable and Windows Mobile.

Dark Horse Comics' imprint DH Press released a novel called Scarface: The Beginning by Leslie Esdaile Banks, which was followed by Scarface: Point of No Return the next year. IDW Publishing released a five-issue limited series called Scarface: Scarred for Life from December 2006 to April 2007. It starts with corrupt police officers finding that Tony has survived the final mansion showdown. Tony works at rebuilding his criminal empire, similar to the game The World Is Yours. IDW published a four-issue prequel series called Scarface: Devil in Disguise from July to October 2007. It follows Tony as he grows up on the crime-filled streets of a Fidel Castro-controlled Cuba, ultimately molding himself into the potential Miami-based gangster seen in the film. An iOS and Android game, Scarface, was released in 2012.

A 3D recreation of Tony's mansion was featured in the November 9, 2006, episode of MTV Cribs as a marketing piece by Vivendi (before being acquired by Activision) for the release of Scarface: The World Is Yours. The episode features a 3D model of Tony (voiced by André Sogliuzzo) leading a cameraman throughout his mansion, giving an in-depth tour of each room in a 3D environment. Tony's mansion is modeled after its appearance in the film and is also used in the game.

== Canceled sequel ==
In 2001, plans were made for hip-hop artist Cuban Link to write and star in a sequel of Scarface titled Son of Tony. The plans drew both praise and criticism and, after several years, Cuban Link indicated that he may no longer be involved with the project as the result of film rights issues and creative control.

== Proposed remake ==
In 2011, Universal began developing a new version of Scarface. The studio stated that the new film would neither be a sequel nor a remake, but would take elements from both this version and its 1932 predecessor, including the basic premise: a man who becomes a kingpin in his quest for the American Dream. Bregman, who produced the 1983 remake, was set to produce this version also, with a screenplay by David Ayer, and David Yates in talks to direct the film.

In March 2014, TheWrap reported that Pablo Larraín was in negotiations to direct the film, along with Paul Attanasio to write the script. The film's update was going to be an original story set in modern-day Los Angeles that follows a Mexican immigrant's rise in the criminal underworld as he strives for the American Dream. Jonathan Herman was set in March 2015 to rewrite both drafts of the script. Antoine Fuqua was hired to direct the film in August 2016, with Terence Winter to pen the script for the film. In January 2017, Fuqua left the project, and Diego Luna was cast in the lead role.

The film was initially scheduled to be released in theaters on August 10, 2018, with the film's script written by the Coen brothers. Fuqua was brought back to direct the new film, with Gareth Dunnet-Alcocer rewriting the screenplay. Fuqua again departed the project in May 2020. Instead, Luca Guadagnino signed to direct the film, with the script again confirmed to be by the Coen brothers. By 2023, the status of the film had reached a standstill. In November 2023, Guadagnino told The Hindu that he was no longer attached to the project. In 2025, it was announced by Deadline that Danny Ramirez and Tom Culliver were working on a new adaptation of Armitage Trail's original novel set in the modern day, with Ramirez producing and starring in the lead role.

== Bibliography ==
- Bogue, Ronald (Winter 1993). "De Palma's Postmodern" Scarface" and the Simulacrum of Class". Criticism. 35 (1). Detroit, Michigan: Wayne State University Press: 115–129. JSTOR 23113595.
- Hodgson, David S. J.; Mylonas, Eric (2006). Scarface: The World is Yours: Prima Official Game Guide. Prima Games. ISBN 978-0-7615-5050-1. Archived from the original on August 7, 2020.
- Da Silva David (2025). Scarface de Brian De Palma. Le Destin tragique de Tony Montana dans un monde néolibéral [Scarface by Brian De Palma. The tragic fate of Tony Montana in a neoliberal world] (in French). Editions LettMotif, ISBN 978-2-36716-444-1
- Labombarda, Arnaud (2010). Scarface, ou le fantasme du paradis [Scarface, or the fantasy of paradise] (in French). Editions L'Harmattan. ISBN 978-2-296-22424-7. Archived from the original on July 29, 2016.
- Martin, Jeffrey Brown (1985). Ben Hecht: Hollywood Screenwriter. Ann Arbor, Michigan: UMI Research Press. ISBN 978-0-8357-1571-3.
- McAvennie, Michael (2007). Say Hello to My Little Friend!: The Quotable Scarface (TM). Simon and Schuster. ISBN 978-1-4165-6846-9. Archived from the original on July 21, 2020.
- Pape, Alexander Christian (2010). Drogen in den Filmen "Scarface" und "Maria, llena eres de gracia": Mediale Darstellung, Problemvermittlung und gesellschaftliche Hintergründe [Drugs in the Films "Scarface" and "Maria, llena eres de gracia": Multimedia Presentation, Problem Mediation and Social Backgrounds] (in German). GRIN Verlag. ISBN 978-3-640-75514-1. Archived from the original on August 7, 2020.
- Priggé, Steven (2004). Movie Moguls Speak: Interviews with Top Film Producers. Jefferson, N.C.: McFarland & Company. ISBN 0-7864-1929-6. OCLC 55738228. Archived from the original on August 18, 2020.
- Stevenson, Damian (2015). Scarface: The Ultimate Guide. Lulu.com. ISBN 978-1-329-30523-6. Archived from the original on August 7, 2020.
- Tucker, Ken (2011) [2008]. Scarface Nation: The Ultimate Gangster Movie and How It Changed America (ebook ed.). New York: St. Martin's Press. ISBN 978-1-4299-9329-6. OCLC 213451426.
- Wilczynski, Stefan (2010). Subtexte in erfolgreichen Spielfilmen – am Beispiel des Films Scarface [Subtexts in successful feature films – using the example of the film Scarface] (in German). GRIN Verlag. ISBN 978-3-640-66386-6. Archived from the original on August 19, 2020.
