= Elvira Hancock =

Fictional character in Scarface

- Michelle Pfeiffer as Elvira Hancock in the 1983 film
- First appearance: Scarface (1983)
- Created by: Oliver Stone
- Portrayed by: Michelle Pfeiffer

In-universe information
- Nickname: Elvie
- Occupation: Housewife
- Spouse: Tony Montana (widowed)
- Nationality: American
- Affiliation: Frank Lopez; Tony Montana; Manny Ribera
- Birthplace: Baltimore, Maryland, U.S.

Elvira Hancock is a fictional character in the 1983 American crime drama film Scarface, portrayed by Michelle Pfeiffer. This proved to be her breakthrough role. She is the mistress of Frank Lopez (Robert Loggia) and after his death, becomes the wife of Tony Montana (Al Pacino).

== Casting ==
Before Michelle Pfeiffer was cast as Elvira Hancock, Geena Davis, Carrie Fisher and Sharon Stone unsuccessfully auditioned for the part, and actresses Rosanna Arquette, Melanie Griffith and Kim Basinger turned it down. Kelly McGillis and Sigourney Weaver were also considered. Initially, Al Pacino and director Brian De Palma did not want Pfeiffer to play Hancock as her only major film role up to that point had been a comedic role in the flop Grease 2. Pacino and De Palma instead wanted Glenn Close to play the role, but producer Martin Bregman fought for her inclusion.

Michelle Pfeiffer's agent called Bregman and requested him to pay for her transportation from Los Angeles to New York City. Bregman refused and Pfeiffer reached the audition theater on the West Side of Manhattan by her own means. Bregman said in a later interview that, after the audition, he was sure that she would get the part playing Hancock. Pfeiffer said that she spent much of the shoot hungry, as she had lost a significant amount of weight to play the role of a coke-addict and "couldn't eat" lest she gain it back.

== Character biography ==
Not much is known about Elvira Hancock's past other than that she was born in Baltimore, Maryland. After leaving Baltimore, she headed to Miami in search of her biological father. She took work as a waitress in a club called the Babylon Club, where she met drug lord Frank Lopez. Soon after, Frank offered her a job as a secretary for Lopez Motors.

There, she and Frank fell in love with the two eventually getting married. Somewhere along the way, their marriage began to wane after Elvira became heavily addicted to cocaine. Tony Montana, a Cuban refugee who finds work with Lopez, takes an immediate liking to Elvira, and attempts to win her over. At first Elvira wants nothing to do with Tony, seeing him as a nuisance. After Tony begins to amass more power within the drug world, he promises her that he will treat her better than Lopez. Realizing that she has developed feelings for him, Tony asks Elvira to marry him. Despite wanting to, she declines as she is still legally married to Lopez. Soon after, Tony's friend Manny kills Frank after Lopez had organized a failed hit on Tony's life, thus allowing the two to get married soon after.

As Tony consolidates more power, Elvira becomes increasingly more detached from reality. Their marriage also begins to suffer due to Elvira's drug addiction and Tony's never-ending obsession with money and power. While at dinner, an intoxicated Tony berates her for her lack of eating, rampant cocaine usage, and her infertility. Having had enough, Elvira causes a scene by spilling water at Tony’s face, then lashes out at him for doing drugs and killing people, always having all his henchmen around at all times, and for not being a proper husband, let alone a future father. This comes to a head as Tony attempts to assault Elvira only to be held back by Manny. Elvira, realizing what her life has become, tells Tony she is leaving him for good.

== Reception and legacy ==
Critic Roger Ebert wrote "that [Montana] must have [Hancock] is clear, but what he intends to do with her is not; there is no romance between them, no joy [...] she's along for the drugs". Vincent Canby felt that for her role, "[Pfeiffer] would not be easily forgotten". Susan C. Boyd labels her as "the token cultural symbol of Western male capitalist success".

In his review of Scarface for Texas Monthly, James Wolcott likens her to the "white-satin molls" portrayed by actress Jean Harlow. Pointing towards the lack of romance between Montana and Hancock, he notes that both are "travelling along parallel lines of toot". Sherrie A. Inness compares her to Poppy in the 1932 Scarface and points out that though Montana and Hancock get married, this "hardly uplifts her character". She describes her as an "embittered drug addict with the self-esteem of an empty bullet casing" and a "complainer".

Amy Adams spoofed Hancock in the Saturday Night Live episode "A Very Cuban Christmas", aired December 20, 2014. In 2011, model Kate Bock appeared as the character in the music video for the song "Jack Sparrow" by comedy troupe The Lonely Island.

The character is noted particularly for her costumes, designed by Patricia Norris. In 2006, Gwen Stefani adopted a look inspired by Hancock. AskMen has ranked her 3rd in its Top 10 Outlaw Girlfriends list.

When a remake of Scarface was announced in 2015, a Bustle magazine article chose Jennifer Lawrence for playing Hancock in the newer version of the film.
