= First Love (1939 film) =

1939 American musical film by Henry Koster

- Theatrical release poster
- Directed by: Henry Koster
- Screenplay by: Lionel Houser; Bruce Manning
- Story by: Henry Myers; Gertrude Purcell
- Produced by: Henry Koster; Joe Pasternak
- Starring: Deanna Durbin; Helen Parrish; Robert Stack; Eugene Pallette; Lewis Howard; June Storey; Leatrice Joy; Marcia Mae Jones; Charles Coleman
- Cinematography: Joseph A. Valentine
- Edited by: Bernard W. Burton
- Music by: Hans J. Salter
- Production company: Universal Pictures
- Distributed by: Universal Pictures
- Release date: November 10, 1939 (USA)
- Running time: 84 minutes
- Country: United States
- Language: English
- Budget: over $1 million or $990,000 or $990,000

First Love is a 1939 American musical film directed by Henry Koster and starring Deanna Durbin. An adaptation of the fairy tale Cinderella, the film is about orphan Constance "Connie" Harding who is sent to live with her wealthy aunt Grace and uncle James after graduating from boarding school. Her life is made difficult by her snobby cousin Barbara who arranges that she stay home while the rest of the family attends a major social ball. With the help of James, Connie makes it to the ball, where she meets and falls in love with Barbara's boyfriend Ted Drake. The film received Academy Award nominations for Best Art Direction and Best Music at the 12th Academy Awards. It was on a preliminary list of submissions from the studios for Best Cinematography (Black-and-White) but was not nominated.

== Plot ==
Constance "Connie" Harding is an unhappy orphan who will soon graduate from Miss Wiggins' School for Girls. Her only real relatives are members from the James Clinton family, but they show little interest in the teenager. She is brought to New York by George, one of their butlers, where she moves in with a bunch of snobs. The upperclass people are not impressed with her, but Connie is able to befriend the servants.

One afternoon, Connie's cousin Barbara orders her to stop Ted Drake from going riding without her. Connie tries the best she can, which results in embarrassing herself. She has secretly fallen in love with him and is filled with joy when she learns the Drake family is organizing a ball. The servants raise money to buy her a fashionable dress. However, Barbara spreads a lie and Connie is eventually prohibited from attending the ball.

Connie is heartbroken, until the servants arrange a limousine she can use until midnight. Meanwhile, the police detain the Clinton family car until almost midnight when they can be brought before a judge, since the chauffeur Terry is missing the vehicle's proof of ownership. At the ball, everyone is impressed with Connie's singing talents. Ted notices her and tries to charm her. They eventually kiss, when Connie realizes it is midnight. She runs off, but accidentally leaves one of her slippers behind. Ted finds the slipper and tries to locate the owner.

Arriving at the ball just before midnight, Barbara spots Connie leaving the ball. Infuriated, she tries to break Connie's confidence and fires all the servants. The next day, Connie is missing as well, and her uncle James berates Grace, Barbara and his son Walter for their hostile/indifferent attitude to Connie. Meanwhile, Connie returns to Miss Wiggins' school in the hope of becoming a music teacher. Ted follows her and they reunite.

== Cast ==
- Deanna Durbin as Constance "Connie" Harding
- Robert Stack as Ted Drake
- Eugene Pallette as James F. Clinton
- Helen Parrish as Barbara Clinton
- Lewis Howard as Walter Clinton
- Leatrice Joy as Grace Shute Clinton
- June Storey as Wilma van Everett
- Frank Jenks as Office Mike
- Kathleen Howard as Miss Wiggins
- Thurston Hall as Anthony Drake
- Marcia Mae Jones as Marcia Parker
- Samuel S. Hinds as Mr. Parker
- Doris Lloyd as Mrs. Parker
- Charles Coleman as George
- Jack Mulhall as Terry
- Mary Treen as Agnes
- Dorothy Vaughan as Ollie
- Lucille Ward as Clinton's Cook
- Larry Steers as Ball Guest (uncredited)
- Eric Wilton as Drake's Butler (uncredited)

== Production ==
In April 1938, Universal announced Deanna Durbin would star in Cinderella directed by Henry Koster and producer by Joe Pasternak from a script by Bruce Manning and Felix Jackson, in color. In May, the studio said Durbin would make the film following Three Smart Girls Grow Up. However, in late May it was reported the film was abandoned due to protests by exhibitors and also the objections of Walt Disney who said he owned the title.

In June 1938, Peter Milne and Irma von Cube were reported writing the script, now called First Love. In January 1939, Charles Boyer signed to co-star. The film was pushed back to Durbin could make After School Days. Eventually Boyer dropped out of the film. Lewis Howard and Robert Stack were signed to make their debuts. Filming started June 1939. The movie was shot in black and white. Filming started with writer Manning saying he was unsure of the ending.

Joe Pasternak later wrote in his memoirs there had been pressure at Universal to put Durbin in older roles:

I insisted that Deanna was one of those personalities which the world not only takes to its bosom but insists as regarding as its personal property. We dressed her, as I said, with great consideration for her position. The occasion of her first kiss was as significant to us, and, as it happened, to her audience, as must be the first kiss of any girl sixteen years old. We instituted a veritable Gone With the Wind-style search for the right boy. Robert Stack finally won it. A million words must have been written on the subject. I do not contend that there were not more weighty matters at the time. But it is proof, I think, of the interest that every stage of Deanna's development held for the world.

== Reception ==
In his review in The New York Times, Frank S. Nugent wrote that the film "affords the usual pleasant scope for the talents, graces and charming accomplishments of Miss Deanna Durbin." Nugent continued:

Certainly there is nothing highbrow about Deanna and her vocal selections, which this time include a sentimental number called "Home, Sweet Home", that sounds as if it has the makings of a hit. The most pretentious item is an Englished version of Puccini's "Un bel di" ending prettily with a romantic crisis when Prince Charming walks in tactfully on the correct note to save Deanna from a life of school-marmish spinsterhood. The story is slight, fragile and appropriately dewy, as befits the Dresden-in-modern-dress spectacle of Miss Durbin standing with exceedingly unreluctant feet where the brook and river meet. That much advertised First Kiss is consummated with such idyllic restraint that not even the queasiest stockholder could fear that Miss Durbin will burn herself out emotionally before she is 20.
