= The Thirteenth Guest =

1932 film

- Directed by: Albert Ray
- Written by: Arthur Hoerl (screenplay); Frances Hyland (screenplay); Armitage Trail (additional dialogue)
- Produced by: M.H. Hoffman
- Starring: Ginger Rogers; Lyle Talbot; J. Farrell MacDonald; Paul Hurst; Erville Alderson; Ethel Wales; Crauford Kent; Eddie Phillips; Frances Rich
- Cinematography: Tom Galligan; Harry Neumann
- Edited by: Leete Renick Brown
- Production company: Monogram Pictures Corporation
- Distributed by: Monogram Pictures Corporation
- Release date: August 9, 1932
- Running time: 69 minutes
- Country: United States
- Language: English

The Thirteenth Guest is a 1932 American pre-Code mystery comedy thriller film, released on August 9, 1932. The film is also known as Lady Beware in the United Kingdom. It is based on the 1929 novel The Thirteenth Guest written by crime fiction author Armitage Trail, best known for the novel Scarface on which the 1932 movie of the same name was based. The novel was filmed again in 1943 as Mystery of the 13th Guest.

== Plot ==
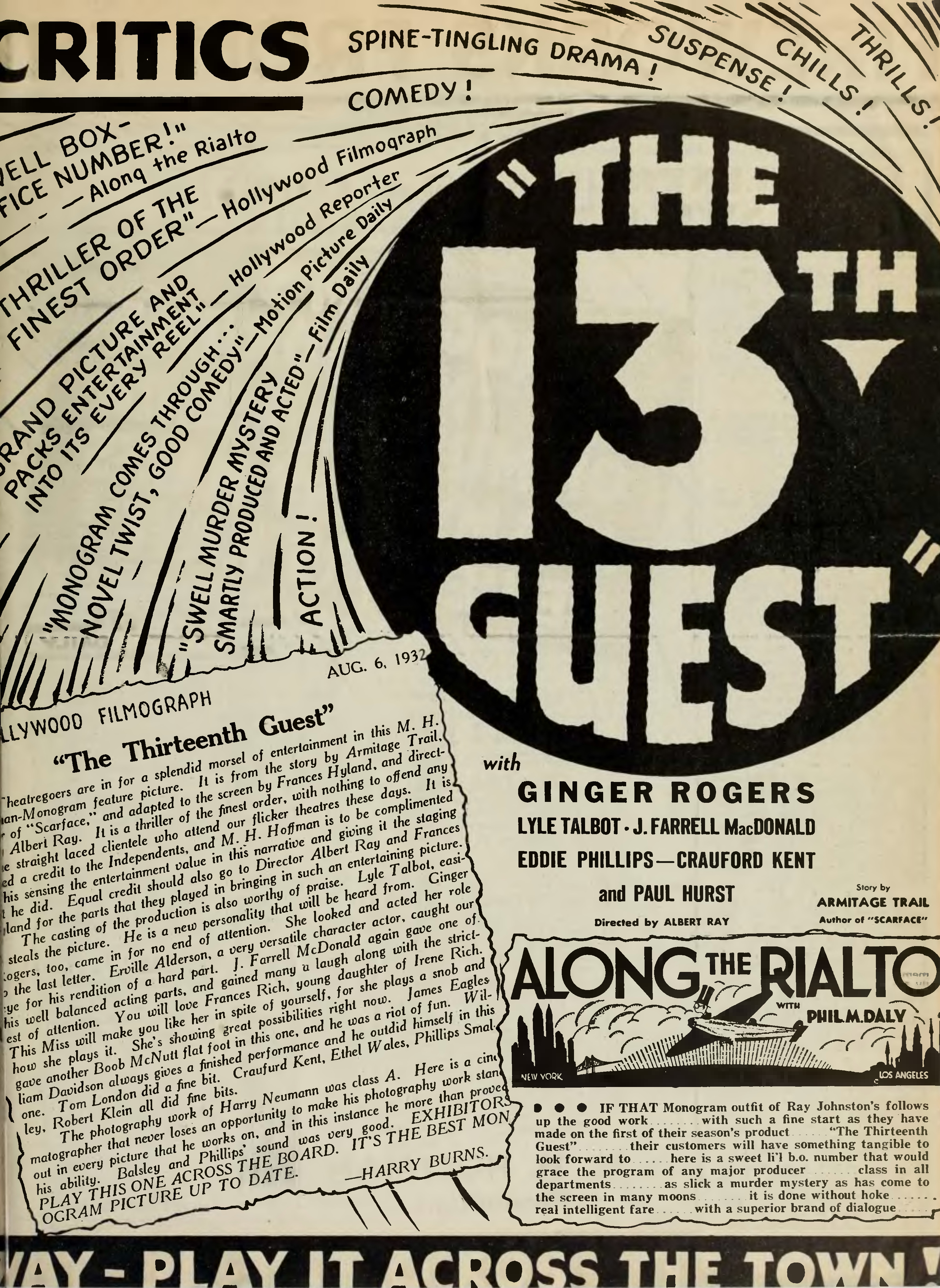
The Thirteenth Guest ad from The Film Daily, 1932

Thirteen years ago, twelve guests attended a dinner party, to which the 13th guest failed to arrive. Now the master of the manor has died and left the bulk of his estate to this 13th guest, but nobody knows who this person might be. Meanwhile, somebody is murdering the remaining guests and placing their dead bodies at the table, each in the same seat he or she occupied at the party thirteen years ago.

== Cast ==
- Ginger Rogers as Lela/Marie Morgan
- Lyle Talbot as Phil Winston
- J. Farrell MacDonald as Police Captain Ryan
- Paul Hurst as Detective Grump
- Erville Alderson as Uncle John Adams
- Ethel Wales as Aunt Jane Thornton
- James Eagles as Harold 'Bud' Morgan
- Crauford Kent as Dr. Sherwood
- Eddie Phillips as Thor Jensen
- Frances Rich as Marjorie Thornton
- Phillips Smalley as Uncle Dick Thornton
- Allan Cavan as Uncle Wayne Seymour (uncredited)
- William Davidson as Police Captain Brown (uncredited)
- John Ince as Uncle John Morgan (uncredited)
- Tom London as Detective Carter (uncredited)
- Harry Tenbrook as Cabby (uncredited)
- Adrienne Dore as Winston's Date (uncredited)

== Reception ==
The film was a box office success and received some positive reviews from critics. Variety called it "vastly superior" and "a positive money maker".

== See also ==
- List of films in the public domain in the United States
