= Too Many Blondes =

1941 film by Thornton Freeland

- Directed by: Thornton Freeland
- Written by: Louis S. Kaye; Maxwell Shane
- Produced by: Joseph Gershenson
- Starring: Rudy Vallee; Helen Parrish; Lon Chaney Jr.
- Cinematography: Milton R. Krasner
- Edited by: Bernard W. Burton
- Music by: Frank Skinner
- Production company: Universal Pictures
- Distributed by: Universal Pictures
- Release date: August 1, 1941
- Running time: 60 minutes
- Country: United States
- Language: English

Too Many Blondes is a 1941 American musical comedy film directed by Thornton Freeland and starring Rudy Vallee, Helen Parrish and Lon Chaney Jr. It was produced and distributed by Universal Pictures.

== Synopsis ==
Dick Kerrigan, a singer, goes on tour but can't give up his fascination with woman despite being newly married to Virginia. While he is away she is courted by her former suitor Ted Bronson who tries to persuade her to get a divorce.

== Cast ==
- Rudy Vallee as Dick Kerrigan
- Helen Parrish as Virginia Kerrigan
- Lon Chaney Jr. as Marvin Gimble
- Jerome Cowan as Ted Bronson
- Shemp Howard as Hotel Manager Ambrose Tripp
- Iris Adrian as Hortense Kent
- Eddie Quillan as Wally Pelton
- Irving Bacon as Radio Station Manager Twitchell
- Jean Brooks as Angie De Vol
- Francisco Moreno as Luis Gravanza
- Gus Schilling as Elevator Operator
- Dorothy Lee as Lorene La Rue
- Carmella Cansino as Dancer
- Jose Cansino as Dancer
- Humberto Herrera as Orchestra Leader
- Eddie Bruce as Ken Atterbury
- Eddie Coke as Usher
- James Conaty as Nightclub Patron
- Kernan Cripps as Gate Official
- Guy D'Ennery as Croupier
- Paul Ellis as Hotel Clerk
- Douglas Evans as UBC Radio Network Announcer
- Edgar Kennedy as Hotel Manager
- Milton Kibbee as Brakeman
- Reid Kilpatrick as Announcer
- Ethelreda Leopold as Secretary
- Jerry Mandy as Bartender
- Paul McVey as Mr. Talbott – Sponsor
- Edmund Mortimer as Nightclub Patron
- Gene O'Donnell as Announcer
- Joey Ray as Chris Jackson
- Joe Recht as Messenger Boy
- Dinorah Rego as 'Chick-a-Boom' Singer
- Jolly Rowlings as Smiley
- Charles Trowbridge as John V. Burton
- Janet Warren as Sophie Deltz
- Jasper Weldon as Black Porter
- Ernest Wilson as Red Cap
- Marek Windheim as Manuel
- Catherine Winter as Salesgirl

== Bibliography ==
- Fetrow, Alan G. Feature Films, 1940–1949: a United States Filmography. McFarland, 1994.
- Smith, Don G. Lon Chaney, Jr.: Horror Film Star, 1906–1973. McFarland, 2004.
