= X Marks the Spot (1942 film) =

1942 film by George Sherman

- Film poster
- Directed by: George Sherman
- Screenplay by: Richard Murphy; Stuart Palmer
- Story by: Mauri Grashin; Robert T. Shannon
- Produced by: George Sherman
- Starring: Damian O'Flynn; Helen Parrish; Dick Purcell
- Cinematography: Jack A. Marta
- Edited by: Arthur Roberts
- Production company: Republic Pictures
- Distributed by: Republic Pictures
- Release date: November 4, 1942 (United States)
- Running time: 55 minutes
- Country: United States
- Language: English

X Marks the Spot is a 1942 American film noir crime film directed by George Sherman and Damian O'Flynn, Helen Parrish, and Dick Purcell. It is a remake of the 1931 film of the same name.

== Plot ==
In 1942, during the Second World War, rubber is a valuable commodity. Eddie Delaney is a second lieutenant in the army, but also a private detective. Eddy swings into action when his father, police-sergeant Timothy J. Delaney, is gunned down by rubber racketeers.

== Cast ==
- Damian O'Flynn as Eddie Delaney
- Helen Parrish as Linda Ward
- Dick Purcell as Lieutenant William 'Bill' Decker
- Jack La Rue as Marty Clark
- Neil Hamilton as John J. Underwood
- Robert Homans as Police Sergeant Timothy J. Delaney
- Anne Jeffreys as Lulu
- Dick Wessel as Henchman Dizzy
- Esther Muir as Bonnie Bascomb
- Joe Kirk as Henchman Jerry
- Edna Mae Harris as Billie (as Edna Harris)
- Fred Kelsey as Police Officer Martin
- Vince Barnett as George

Sam Bernard, Edmund Cobb, Martin Faust, Jack Gardner, Sam Lufkin, Charles McAvoy and Frank O'Connor appear uncredited.

== Production ==
Melody and Murder was the film's working title.
