= Two Guns and a Badge =

1954 film by Lewis D. Collins

- Theatrical release poster
- Directed by: Lewis D. Collins
- Written by: Daniel B. Ullman
- Produced by: Vincent M. Fennelly
- Starring: Wayne Morris; Morris Ankrum; Beverly Garland; Roy Barcroft; William Edward Phipps; Damian O'Flynn
- Cinematography: Joe Novak
- Edited by: Sam Fields
- Music by: Raoul Kraushaar
- Production company: Silvermine Productions
- Distributed by: Allied Artists Pictures
- Release date: September 12, 1954
- Running time: 69 minutes
- Country: United States
- Language: English

Two Guns and a Badge is a 1954 American Western film directed by Lewis D. Collins and written by Daniel B. Ullman. The film stars Wayne Morris, Morris Ankrum, Beverly Garland, Roy Barcroft, William Edward Phipps and Damian O'Flynn. The film was released on September 12, 1954, by Allied Artists Pictures.

== Plot ==
Roaming cowboy mistaken for a notorious killer is hired to bring law to the lawless town of Outpost. He is successful until the sheriff discovers he is not the killer and offers him a chance to leave.

== Cast ==
- Wayne Morris as Deputy Jim Blake
- Morris Ankrum as Sheriff Jackson
- Beverly Garland as Gail Sterling
- Roy Barcroft as Bill Sterling
- William Edward Phipps as Dick Grant
- Damian O'Flynn as John Wilson
- I. Stanford Jolley as Sam Allen
- Robert J. Wilke as Moore
- Chuck Courtney as Val Moore
- John Pickard as Sharkey
- Henry Rowland as Rancher Jim Larkin
- Gregg Barton as Outlaw
