= Three Smart Girls Grow Up =

1939 film

- Theatrical release poster
- Directed by: Henry Koster
- Screenplay by: Felix Jackson; Bruce Manning
- Produced by: Joe Pasternak
- Starring: Deanna Durbin; Nan Grey; Helen Parrish
- Cinematography: Joseph A. Valentine
- Edited by: Bernard W. Burton; Ted J. Kent
- Music by: Frank Skinner
- Production company: Universal Pictures
- Distributed by: Universal Pictures
- Release date: March 24, 1939 (US)
- Running time: 90 minutes
- Country: United States
- Language: English
- Budget: $810,000

Three Smart Girls Grow Up is a 1939 American musical comedy film directed by Henry Koster, written by Felix Jackson and Bruce Manning, and starring Deanna Durbin, Nan Grey, and Helen Parrish. Durbin and Grey reprise their roles from Three Smart Girls, and Parrish replaces Barbara Read in the role of the middle sister. Durbin would reprise her role once more in Hers to Hold.

== Plot ==
Three sisters believe life is going to be easy now that their parents are back together, until one sister falls in love with another's fiancé, and the youngest sister plays matchmaker.

== Cast ==
- Deanna Durbin as Penelope 'Penny' Craig
- Nan Grey as Joan Craig
- Helen Parrish as Katherine 'Kay' Craig
- Charles Winninger as Judson Craig
- Nella Walker as Mrs. Craig
- Robert Cummings as Harry Loren
- William Lundigan as Richard Watkins
- Ernest Cossart as Binns, the butler
- Felix Bressart as a music teacher
- Charles Coleman as Henry

== Production ==
In August 1938 Bruce Manning and Felix Jackson were reported as working on a sequel.

In September, Barbara Read, who had been in the original, was considered "a little too grown up" for the sequel and was replaced by Helen Parrish, who had been in Mad About Music with Durbin.

Filming started in November. It halted because Durbin fell ill and resumed on 23 December.

Cummings received a long-term contract from Universal after being cast in the film.

According to Filmink "Cummings found himself as an actor in" this film.

The film's copyright was renewed in 1966. (Note: Under R383292)
