= Helen Parrish =

American actress (1923–1959)

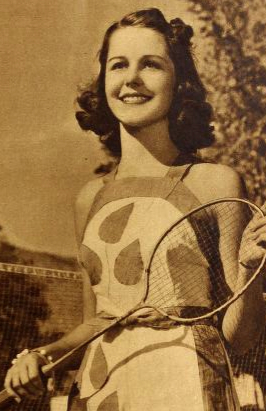
- Parrish pictured in 1940
- Born: March 12, 1923; Columbus, Georgia, U.S.
- Died: February 22, 1959 (aged 35); Hollywood, California, U.S.
- Resting place: Hollywood Forever Cemetery
- Occupation: Actress
- Years active: 1927–1958
- Known for: First Love; Three Smart Girls Grow Up; Mystery of the 13th Guest; They All Kissed the Bride
- Spouse(s): Charles G. Lang Jr. (1942–1954; divorced); 2 children John Guedel (1956–1959; her death)
- Children: 2
- Relatives: Robert Parrish (brother)
- Awards: Hollywood Walk of Fame

Helen Virginia Parrish (March 12, 1923 – February 22, 1959) was an American stage and film actress.

== Career ==
Parrish was born in Columbus, Georgia. She started in movies at the age of 4, getting her first part playing Babe Ruth's daughter in the silent film Babe Comes Home in 1927. She was featured in the Our Gang comedy shorts and sometimes played the lead character as a child, co-starring with some of the great female stars of the day. In her teens she made herself known as a kid sister. During this time she also starred opposite Deanna Durbin in several of her films, playing a jealous, spiteful rival.

Their first film together, Mad About Music (1938), worked so well that they soon formed a sort of Shirley Temple/Jane Withers team in a couple of other movie confections for Universal. In their second film together, Three Smart Girls Grow Up (1939), Parrish replaced Barbara Read as sister Kay Craig. Her films included X Marks the Spot (1931), When a Feller Needs a Friend (1932), A Dog of Flanders (1935), Little Tough Guy (1938), I'm Nobody's Sweetheart Now (1940), You'll Find Out (1940), Too Many Blondes (1941), X Marks the Spot (1942; a remake of her earlier film), Mystery of the 13th Guest (1943) and The Wolf Hunters (1949).

By her mid-twenties she had left motion pictures and turned to television, co-hosting Hour Glass, the first U.S. network variety show in 1946–47. In an era when "... it was a social 'taboo' for a pregnant woman to display herself in public", Parrish was forced to leave Hour Glass as a result of her pregnancy. In 1953, she was host of It's a Good Idea and This Is Your Music.

One notable TV role was that of Geraldine Rutherford in the first season of the American television situation comedy Leave It to Beaver.

Her last role on television was as women's editor of a morning program, Panorama Pacific, on the West Coast.

Parrish appeared in TV commercials for a variety of products throughout the 1950s, earning more income from them than from roles in shows. In 1955, she said that making commercials "turned out to be the next best thing to owning an oil well".

== Family ==
Her brother, Robert Parrish, was a minor child actor who earned respect as a film editor and director and her sister, Beverly Parrish, died suddenly at the age of 11 after filming only one movie.

On July 11, 1942, Parrish married actor Charles G. Lang, Jr. in Hollywood. They had a son and a daughter, then divorced in 1954. On August 3, 1956, she married television producer John Guedel. She had a miscarriage in April 1958.

== Recognition ==
Parrish has a star at 6263 Hollywood Boulevard in the Motion Pictures section of the Hollywood Walk of Fame. It was dedicated on February 8, 1960.

== Death ==
On February 22, 1959, Parrish died of cancer at Presbyterian Hospital in Hollywood. She is buried at the Hollywood Forever Cemetery.

== Partial filmography ==
- Babe Comes Home (1927) - Young Girl (uncredited)
- The Valiant (1929) - Little Child on Train (uncredited)
- Words and Music (1929) - Song and dance principal
- His First Command (1929) - Jane Sargent
- The Big Trail (1930) - Honey Girl Cameron (uncredited)
- Beau Ideal (1931) - Isobel - as a Child (uncredited)
- Cimarron (1931) - Young Donna (uncredited)
- The Public Enemy (1931) - Little Girl (uncredited)
- Seed (1931) - Margaret Carter as a Child
- X Marks the Spot (1931) - Gloria - as a Child (uncredited)
- Forbidden (1932) - Roberta - Age 8 (uncredited)
- When a Feller Needs a Friend (1932) - Diana Manning
- Goldie Gets Along (1933) - Saunders' Child (uncredited)
- Song of the Eagle (1933) - Elsa as a Girl (uncredited)
- Broadway to Hollywood (1933) - Cousin (uncredited)
- The Life of Vergie Winters (1934) - Joan's friend (uncredited)
- There's Always Tomorrow (1934) - Marjorie White
- The Mystery of Edwin Drood (1935) - Schoolgirl (uncredited)
- Straight from the Heart (1935) - Neighbor Girl
- A Dog of Flanders (1935) - Maria Cogez
- Bride of Frankenstein (1935) - Communion girl (uncredited)
- Make Way for a Lady (1936) - Genevieve (uncredited)
- Maytime (1937) - Maypole Singer (uncredited)
- Mad About Music (1938) - Felice
- Little Tough Guy (1938) - Kay Boylan
- Little Tough Guys in Society (1938) - Penny
- Three Smart Girls Grow Up (1939) - Kay Craig
- Winter Carnival (1939) - Ann Baxter
- First Love (1939) - Barbara Clinton
- I'm Nobody's Sweetheart Now (1940) - Gertrude "Trudie" Morgan
- You'll Find Out (1940) - Janis Bellacrest
- Where Did You Get That Girl? (1941) - Helen Borden
- Six Lessons from Madame La Zonga (1941) - Rosie Clancy / Rosita Alvarez
- Too Many Blondes (1941) - Virginia Kerrigan
- It Started with Eve (1941) - Nightclub Patron (uncredited)
- In Old California (1942) - Ellen Sanford
- Tough as They Come (1942) - Ann Wilson
- They All Kissed the Bride (1942) - Vivian Drew
- Sunset Serenade (1942) - Sylvia Clark
- Overland Mail (1942, Serial) - Barbara Gilbert
- X Marks the Spot (1942) - Linda Ward
- Cinderella Swings It (1943) - Sally Murton
- Stage Door Canteen (1943) - Helen Parrish
- The Mystery of the 13th Guest (1943) - Marie Morgan
- Quick on the Trigger (1948) - Nora Reed
- Trouble Makers (1948) - Ann Prescott
- The Wolf Hunters (1949) - Marcia Cameron

== Bibliography ==
- Willson, Dixie. Little Hollywood Stars. Akron, OH, e New York: Saalfield Pub. Co., 1935.
