= Where Did You Get That Girl? =

1941 film by Arthur Lubin

- Directed by: Arthur Lubin
- Written by: Jay Dratler; Paul Franklin; Stanley Rubin
- Story by: Jay Dratler
- Produced by: Joseph Gershenson
- Starring: Leon Errol; Helen Parrish; Charles Lang
- Cinematography: John W. Boyle
- Edited by: Philip Cahn; Adrienne Fazan
- Music by: Charles Previn
- Production company: Universal Pictures
- Distributed by: Universal Pictures
- Release date: 3 January 1941
- Running time: 65 minutes
- Country: United States
- Language: English
- Budget: $83,000

Where Did You Get That Girl? is a 1941 American comedy film directed by Arthur Lubin and starring Leon Errol, Helen Parrish and Charles Lang. The title comes from the popular song of the same name, which dates to 1913 and was written by Bert Kalmar and Harry Puck. The song figures prominently in the film. It was produced and distributed by Universal Pictures. The plot of the film is about the misadventures of a swing band trying to break into the big time. Helen Parrish plays the band's vocalist.

== Plot ==
Poverty stricken musicians borrow instruments from a pawn shop one night and form a band.

== Cast ==
- Leon Errol as MacDevin
- Helen Parrish as Helen Borden
- Charles Lang as Jeff
- Eddie Quillan as Joe
- Franklin Pangborn as Digby
- Stanley Fields as Crandall
- Tom Dugan as Murphy
- Joe Brown Jr. as Davey
- Leonard Sues as Franky
- Kenneth Lundy as Shrimp
- Joe Cobb as Tubby

== Production ==
The film was based on an original story by Jay Dratler. In August 1940 Universal reported that Stanley Rubin and Hal Brock were writing the script. By October Helen Parrish and Charles Lang were set as lead actors. Filming started 30 October.

== Reception ==
The Los Angeles Times called it "a diverting little musical seemingly just missing the hilarious note evidently aimed at."

Diabolique magazine called it "a joyous, breezy, silly musical made with predominantly young talent; you can feel Lubin being in complete charge of the material and having a ball."

== Bibliography ==
- Fetrow, Alan G. Feature Films, 1940-1949: a United States Filmography. McFarland, 1994.
