= Scarface (novel) =

1930 gangster novel by Armitage Trail

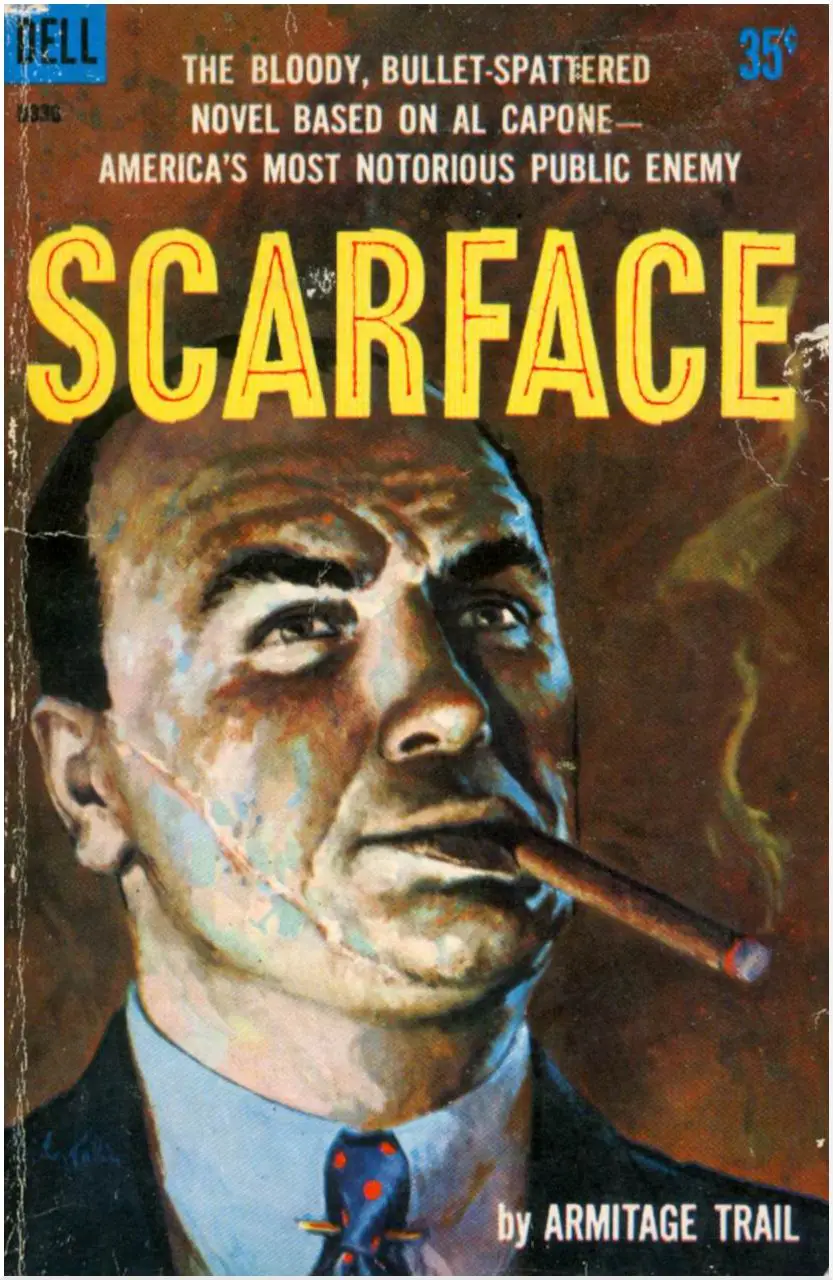
- Author: Armitage Trail
- Language: English
- Genre: Crime fiction
- Published: New York City
- Publisher: A. L. Burt Co.
- Publication date: 1930
- Publication place: United States
- English publication date: June 3, 1930
- Media type: Print (Hardcover, paperback, Bloomsbury Paperback)
- Pages: 166 (Paperback) 140 (Hardcover) 192 (Bloomsbury)
- ISBN: 978-1558801196
- OCLC: 1801693
- LC Class: PZ3.T679 Sc
- Text: Scarface at Wikisource

Scarface is a novel written by Armitage Trail in 1929 and published in 1930. The 1932 and 1983 films were based on it. The twenty-eight-year-old author died suddenly of a heart attack nine months after the novel was published. The novel has since lapsed into the public domain in the United States, as its copyright was not renewed, and in countries such as EU states where the term of copyright is author's life plus 70 years.

== Plot ==
The book's storyline is heavily inspired by the real life gangster Al Capone, whose nickname was also "Scarface". Tony "Scarface" Guarino works as a bouncer. During his time there, he flirts with Vyvyan, girlfriend of mob leader Al Springola. He kills Springola, and becomes the boyfriend of Vyvyan. During that time he also starts working as a soldier for a mafia gang. He eventually begins his own crime reign, and moves in to take over the illegal alcohol business in an unnamed city during the Prohibition Era, changing his surname to Camonte. A year later, he has become the most powerful gang leader in the city, performing a series of daring killings and learns that his brother has been promoted in the police. The police eventually go after him, and he is ultimately shot dead by his brother, the chief of police, who fails to recognize him due to the family believing him to have died in World War I.

== Adaptations ==
=== 1932 film ===
Scarface (also known as Scarface: The Shame of the Nation and The Shame of a Nation) is a 1932 American pre-Code gangster film starring Paul Muni as Antonio "Tony" Camonte. It was produced by Howard Hughes & Howard Hawks, directed by Hawks (with Hughes adding two moralistic scenes directed by Richard Rosson). The story is based on Armitage Trail's 1929 novel of the same name, which is loosely based on the rise and fall of Al Capone. The film features Ann Dvorak as Camonte's sister, and also stars Karen Morley, Osgood Perkins, and Boris Karloff. The plot centers on gang warfare and police intervention when rival gangs fight over control of Chicago. A version of the Saint Valentine's Day Massacre is also depicted.

=== 1983 film ===
Scarface is a 1983 American crime film directed by Brian De Palma and written by Oliver Stone. The film tells the story of Cuban refugee Tony Montana (Al Pacino) who arrives to Miami in the 1980s, with nothing and rises to become a powerful drug kingpin. Rather than being a new adaptation based on the novel, the film is primarily a remake and major modernization of the 1932 film. The cast also features Mary Elizabeth Mastrantonio, Steven Bauer, and Michelle Pfeiffer.
