= Mystery of the 13th Guest =

1943 American crime/mystery film by William Beaudine

- Directed by: William Beaudine
- Screenplay by: Tim Ryan; Charles R. Marion; Arthur Hoerl
- Based on: The 13th Guest by Armitage Trail
- Produced by: Lindsley Parsons
- Starring: Helen Parrish; Dick Purcell; Tim Ryan
- Cinematography: Mack Stengler
- Edited by: Richard C. Currier
- Music by: Edward J. Kay
- Production company: Monogram Pictures
- Distributed by: Monogram Pictures
- Release dates: October 5, 1943 (New York, United States)
- Running time: 61 minutes
- Country: United States
- Language: English

The Mystery of the 13th Guest is a 1943 American crime/mystery film directed by William Beaudine and released by Monogram Pictures. It is based on Armitage Trail's 1929 novel The 13th Guest and is an updated version of the 1932 film The Thirteenth Guest. The film stars Helen Parrish as a young woman who returns to her grandfather's house 13 years after his death to read his will according to his wishes.

== Plot ==
When Marie Morgan (Helen Parrish) was eight years old, she attended a banquet held by her dying grandfather, who disliked everyone in his family except her. That day he instructed her to return to his house upon her twenty-first birthday to read his will alone. Marie arrives at the house, and although it has been vacant for 13 years, the lights and telephone both appear to be working. Marie thinks back to the day her grandfather told her about his will and recalls the seating arrangement. There were twelve guests in attendance, but a thirteenth place to her grandfather's right was empty. Marie presently decides to open the envelope containing the will. Inside is a sheet of paper with the numbers 13-13-13 written with nothing else. Someone suddenly enters the house and a gunshot is heard, and Marie screams.

She next finds herself sitting at the dinner table in the same place as when she was eight, but the doctor pronounces her dead. Police Lt. Burke (Tim Ryan) and Private Investigator Johnny Smith (Dick Purcell) are put on the case, but it is soon revealed that Marie is still alive. Barksdale (Cyril Ring), Marie's attorney who sat to the left of her at the banquet, is found dead in the exact chair he sat in 13 years ago. The detectives conclude that the killer is targeting the guests by where they sat, and therefore the murderer must have been one of the 13 guests.

== Cast ==
- Helen Parrish as Marie Morgan - Granddaughter
- Dick Purcell as Johnny Smith - Private detective
- Tim Ryan as Lieut. Burke - Police
- Frank Faylen as Speed DuGan aka McGinis
- Jacqueline Dalya as Marjory Morgan - Cousin
- Paul McVey as Adam Morgan - Uncle
- John Duncan as Harold Morgan - "Bud" - Marie's brother
- John Dawson as Tom Jackson - Cousin
- Cyril Ring as John Barksdale - Attorney
- Addison Richards as Jim - District Attorney
- Lloyd Ingraham as Grandfather Morgan

== Reception ==
In comparing it to the 1932 version, Dave Sindelar states that while neither film is excellent, he notes the novelty in the previous film featuring early roles of Ginger Rogers and James Gleason. While he does not find a similar novelty in this version, he admits "it has efficient direction from William Beaudine and the comic relief manage to keep on the right side of annoying."
