= Damian O'Flynn =

American actor

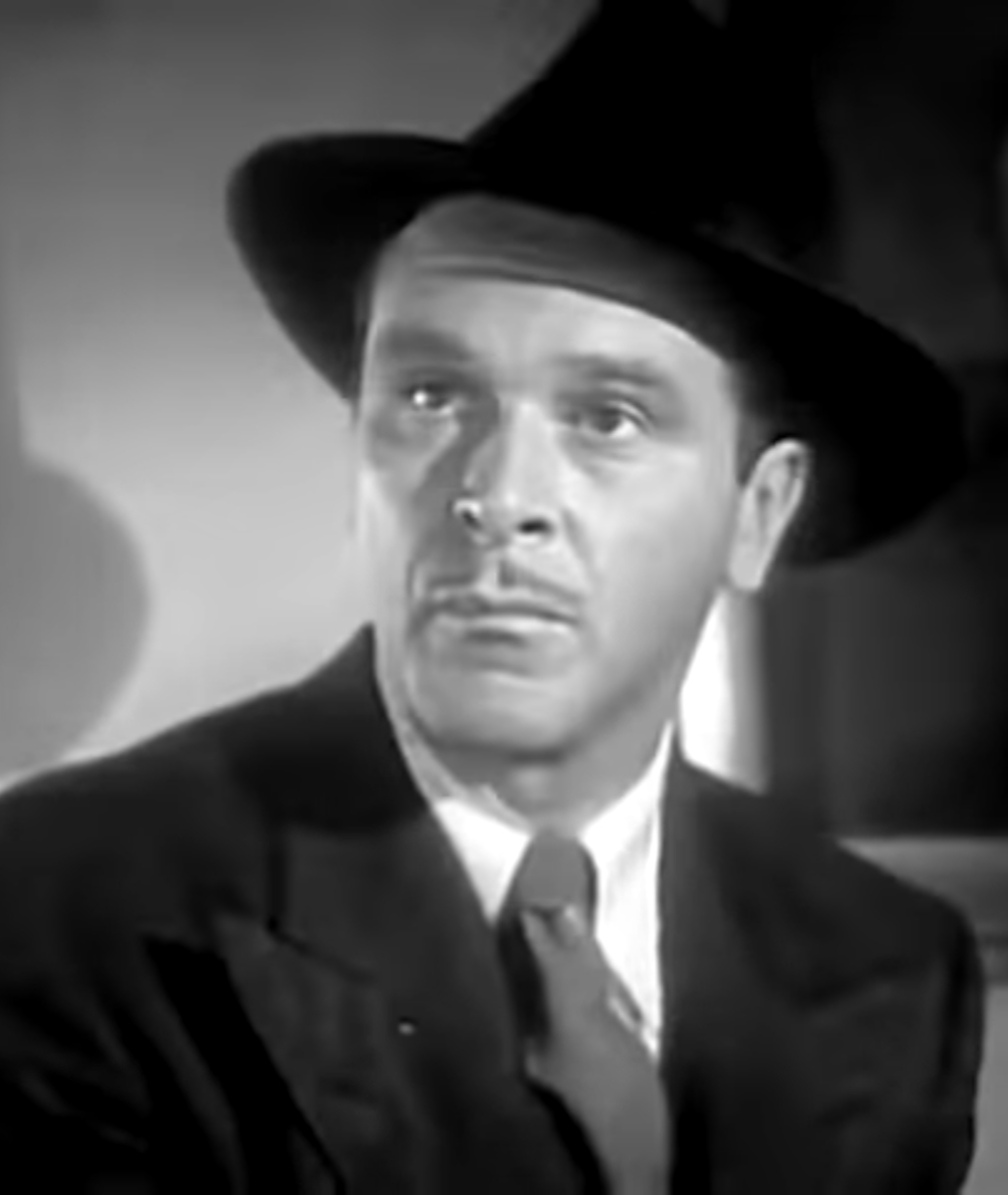
- O'Flynn in X Marks the Spot (1942)
- Born: January 29, 1907; Holt, Nebraska, U.S.
- Died: August 8, 1982 (aged 75); Los Angeles, California, U.S.
- Occupation: Actor
- Years active: 1937–1969

Damian O'Flynn (January 29, 1907 – August 8, 1982) was an Irish-American actor of film and television originally from Holt, Nebraska.

== Biography ==
Damian Francis Flynn, stage name Damian O'Flynn, began his stage career in Omaha before attempting the New York stage. He moved to Los Angeles in 1936 and made his screen debut in Marked Woman (1937), after which he was a freelance player for such studios as Warner Brothers, Paramount, and RKO Pictures. While serving in World War II, he was cast with several other actors-in-uniform in Winged Victory, a production of 20th Century Fox.

O'Flynn appeared in many western films and television series. He was cast with Ben Cooper in Gunfight at Comanche Creek (1963) and had a bit part in The Far Country (1954). He appeared in two secondary roles in sixty episodes of The Life and Legend of Wyatt Earp.

In addition to his work in westerns, O'Flynn guest-starred in two episodes of the CBS situation comedy Mr. Adams and Eve in 1957–1958. He played a desk clerk in a 1969 Green Acres episode entitled "The Marital Vacation."

O'Flynn's acting career ended in 1969, and he died in 1982 in Los Angeles, California.

== Selected filmography ==
- Marked Woman (1937) - Ralph Krawford
- Rage in Heaven (1941) - Bill - Steelworker #3 (uncredited)
- Lady Scarface (1941) - Lt. Onslow
- The Gay Falcon (1941) - Noel Weber
- The Great Man's Lady (1942) - Burns (uncredited)
- Broadway (1942) - Scar Edwards
- Powder Town (1942) - Oliver Lindsay
- Wake Island (1942) - Capt. Bill Patrick
- X Marks the Spot (1942) - Eddie Delaney
- Flight for Freedom (1943) - Pete (uncredited)
- Sarong Girl (1943) - Gil Gailord
- So Proudly We Hail! (1943) - Capt. Saunders (uncredited)
- Winged Victory (1944) - Col. Ross (uncredited)
- Miss Susie Slagle's (1946) - Dr. Benton (uncredited)
- Crack-Up (1946) - Stevenson
- The Bachelor's Daughters (1946) - Rex Miller
- The Devil on Wheels (1947) - John Clark
- The Beginning or the End (1947) - C.D. Howe
- Philo Vance Returns (1947) - Larry Blendon
- Saddle Pals (1947) - Bradford Collins
- Web of Danger (1947) - Bill O'Hara
- Devil Ship (1947) - Red Mason
- On Our Merry Way (1948) - Charlie Smallwood - Movie Director (uncredited)
- Half Past Midnight (1948) - Murray Evans
- A Foreign Affair (1948) - Lieutenant Colonel
- The Snake Pit (1948) - Mr. Stuart
- Disaster (1948) - Detective Dearborn
- Words and Music (1948) - Producer (uncredited)
- Riders of the Whistling Pines (1949) - Henchman Bill Wright
- Outpost in Morocco (1949) - Commandant Louis Fronval
- Black Midnight (1949) - Bill Jordan
- Pioneer Marshal (1949) - Bruce Burnett
- Young Daniel Boone (1950) - Capt. Fraser
- Bomba and the Hidden City (1950) - Dennis Johnson
- Mystery Submarine (1950) - Admiral (uncredited)
- Gambling House (1951) - Ralph Douglas
- You're in the Navy Now (1951) - Doctor (uncredited)
- Inside the Walls of Folsom Prison (1951) - Capt. Baxter (uncredited)
- Fighting Coast Guard (1951) - Captain Adair
- Yellow Fin (1951) - Capt. John Donovan
- Hoodlum Empire (1952) - Ralph Foster
- The Pride of St. Louis (1952) - Johnnie Bishop (uncredited)
- The Half-Breed (1952) - Captain Jackson
- Plymouth Adventure (1952) - Clarke (uncredited)
- Thunderbirds (1952) - Minor Role (uncredited)
- The Glenn Miller Story (1954) - Col. Baker (uncredited)
- The Miami Story (1954) - Police Chief Martin Belman
- The Far Country (1954) - Second Mate on Riverboat (uncredited)
- The Black Shield of Falworth (1954) - Sir Alexander (uncredited)
- Two Guns and a Badge (1954) - John Wilson - Banker
- Daddy Long Legs (1955) - Larry Hamilton (uncredited)
- One Desire (1955) - Fire Chief (uncredited)
- Teen-Age Crime Wave (1955) - Police Chief (uncredited)
- Hidden Guns (1956) - Kingsley
- D-Day the Sixth of June (1956) - Gen. Pike (uncredited)
- Drango (1957) - Gareth Blackford
- Apache Warrior (1957) - Major
- Teenage Doll (1957) - Harold Bonney (uncredited)
- Eighteen and Anxious (1957) - John Bayne
- Why Must I Die? (1960) - D.A. Walter Dennison
- Gunfight at Comanche Creek (1963) - Asa Winton (uncredited)
- Mirage (1965) - Bar Patron (uncredited)
