= Diamond Trail =

1933 film

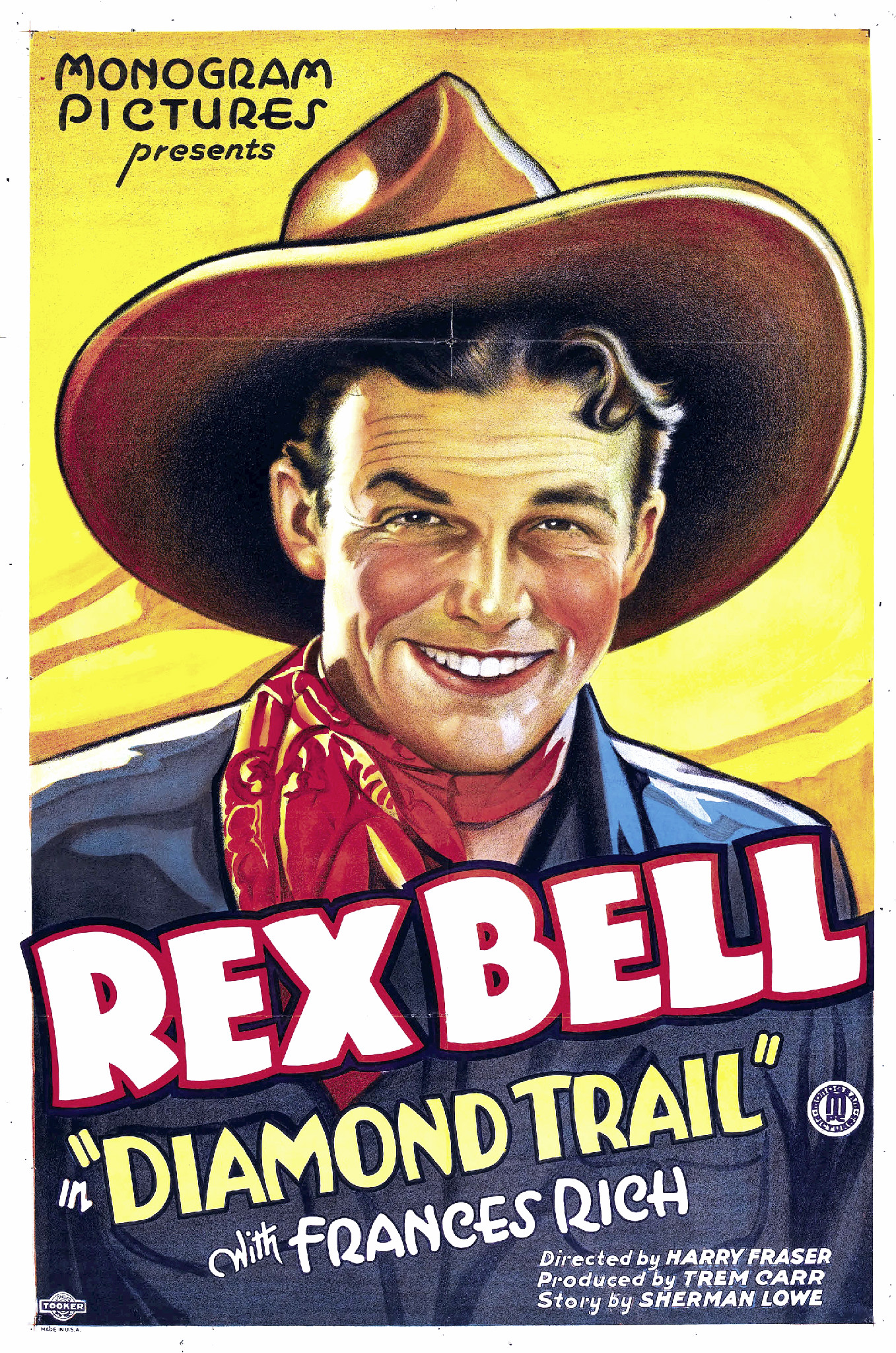
- Film poster
- Directed by: Harry L. Fraser
- Written by: Harry L. Fraser (writer); Sherman L. Lowe (adaptation); Sherman L. Lowe (story)
- Produced by: Trem Carr (producer)
- Starring: See below
- Cinematography: Faxon M. Dean
- Edited by: Carl Pierson
- Release date: April 23, 1933
- Running time: 61 minutes
- Country: United States
- Language: English

Diamond Trail is a 1933 American Pre-Code film directed by Harry L. Fraser.

== Plot ==
Rex Bell portrays a "wise-cracking reporter-detective", similar to his role in From Broadway to Cheyenne, as he solves a case involving jewel thieves. Opening in a city setting, the film shifts to Nevada as Bell's character works to solve the case. Frances Rich makes her film debut.

== Cast ==
- Rex Bell as "Speed" Morgan, posing as Frisco Eddie
- Frances Rich as Lois Miller
- Lloyd Whitlock as 'Flash' Barrett
- Bud Osborne as Bill Miller
- Jerome Storm as a Barrett henchman
- John Webb Dillon as a Barrett henchman
- Billy West as Barrett's henchman "Mac"
