= Web of Danger =

1947 film by Philip Ford

- Theatrical release poster
- Directed by: Philip Ford
- Screenplay by: David Lang; Milton Raison
- Produced by: Donald H. Brown
- Starring: Adele Mara; Bill Kennedy; Damian O'Flynn; Richard Loo; Victor Sen Yung; Roy Barcroft
- Cinematography: Alfred S. Keller
- Edited by: William P. Thompson
- Music by: Mort Glickman
- Production company: Republic Pictures
- Distributed by: Republic Pictures
- Release date: June 10, 1947
- Running time: 58 minutes
- Country: United States
- Language: English

Web of Danger is a 1947 American action film directed by Philip Ford, written by David Lang and Milton Raison, and starring Adele Mara, Bill Kennedy, Damian O'Flynn, Richard Loo, Victor Sen Yung and Roy Barcroft. It was released on June 10, 1947, by Republic Pictures.

== Cast ==
- Adele Mara as Peg Mallory
- Bill Kennedy as Ernie Reardon
- Damian O'Flynn as Bill O'Hara
- Richard Loo as Wing
- Victor Sen Yung as Sam
- Roy Barcroft as Monks
- William Hall as Slim
- J. Farrell MacDonald as Scotty MacKronish
- Archie Twitchell as Ramsey
- Edward Gargan as Dolan
- Chester Clute as Cornflakes Eater
- Ralph Sanford as Peterson
- Russell Hicks as Mr. Gallagher
