= Armitage Trail =

American novelist (1902–1930)

- Born: Maurice R. Coons; July 18, 1902; Madison, Nebraska, U.S.
- Died: October 10, 1930 (aged 28); Los Angeles, California, U.S.
- Resting place: Hollywood Forever Cemetery, Los Angeles, California
- Occupation: Author
- Notable work: Scarface; The Thirteenth Guest
- Parent(s): Oscar Athol Coons, Alice Lucille Coons
- Relatives: Hannibal (Stanley) Coons (brother); Eugene L. Coons (brother); Evelyn Coons (sister); Mary J. McIntyre (grandmother)

Maurice R. Coons (July 18, 1902 – October 10, 1930), known by the pen name Armitage Trail, was an American pulp fiction author, known best for his 1929 novel Scarface. This novel was based on the life of gangster Al Capone, and was adapted as the 1932 film Scarface directed by Howard Hawks and produced by Howard Hughes. The story was later modernized and remade in the 1983 film Scarface directed by Brian De Palma starring Al Pacino. Coons's only other significant work is the detective novel The Thirteenth Guest, though he is speculated to have used a variety of pseudonyms.

== Biography ==
=== Early life ===
Armitage Trail was born Maurice R. Coons on July 18, 1902, in Madison, Nebraska. He was the oldest child of Oscar A. Coons and Alice L. Coons, living also with Alice's mother, Mary J. McIntyre. He had two brothers, Hannibal (born Stanley J. Coons) and Eugene, as well as a sister named Evelyn. Oscar's job as a road tour manager for the New Orleans Opera Company required the family to relocate multiple times before Trail became an adult, with one definite location being New Orleans. While a student at Patterson High School, Trail developed a passion for writing, winning a state-wide essay contest of schools on "We should Buy War Savings Stamps", Trail would leave school to devote his time to writing, later accepting the position of managing editor of the Patterson Tribune. Likewise, his interest in gangsters such as Al Capone began at a young age, and it was stated by Hannibal Coons that his brother Maurice "was interested in gangsters as other men are interested in postage stamps, old coins, or spread-eagled butterflies". Throughout the rest of his teens and early twenties, Maurice Coons used a variety of pseudonyms, writing various crime and detective stories for pulp magazines. During this time, he visited New York City, eventually quitting home to live in the vicinity of Chicago, where he wrote Scarface.

=== Chicago and Scarface ===
Not much is known about Trail's time in Illinois. He lived in Oak Park, Illinois, a town adjacent to the west side of Chicago, where he worked as a reporter for the Chicago Examiner and as an editor for Best Novels Magazine, writing detective stories in his leisure time. He began composing material for his book Scarface during his off hours, spending sleepless nights in his sun-room apartment, jotting down notes, and traveling to New York for information on the gun battle between Francis Crowley and the New York Police Department, according to a relative, Trail, suffering from health issues at the time, had called his brother Hannibal to Chicago, to finish typing the closing pages of Scarface, telling his brother, "Kid, keep it hot and true to life. In the end send that guy to his doom". He did not live there long enough to be recorded by an official U.S. Census. Trail spent much of the rest of his time in Chicago, supposedly being associated with local Sicilian gangs by an Italian-American lawyer with whom he was acquainted. From then on, Trail spent his nights socializing with gang members in order to gain ideas for his novel. Trail published Scarface in 1930.

=== Selling Scarface ===
Producer Howard Hughes eventually approached Trail about his novel with the interest of adapting it as a movie. Trail sold the rights to Scarface to Hughes for $25,000, relocating to Los Angeles in the process, where he lived at 3811 Delmas Terrace St. After selling the rights to Scarface, W.R. Burnett, who worked on the screenplay, stated that Trail began to struggle with alcoholism. Trail lived flamboyantly in Hollywood, rapidly gaining weight, wearing wide-brimmed Borsalino hats, and hiring a black chauffeur and a servant named Elijah Ford.

=== Death ===
Trail never lived to see the movie Scarface finished, as during October 1930 he died of a heart attack at the Paramount Theatre. He is buried in building C, crypt 237, at the Hollywood Forever Cemetery.

== The Thirteenth Guest ==
Trail's first novel, The Thirteenth Guest, was originally published in 1929 under the title of The Morgan Murders, and concerned the investigation of the murder of fictional character Marie Morgan. A private detective surveys the crime scene. The scene is Morgan's grandfather's mansion, where he was also murdered 13 years prior. The novel was later adapted as the film The Thirteenth Guest in 1932 by Albert Ray, and then was remade as Mystery of the 13th Guest in 1943 by William Beaudine.

== Scarface ==
Trail's most famous novel, published in 1930, details the life of Tony "Scarface" Camonte, a character based on gangster Al Capone. The protagonist has the same first name for all three of the Scarface works. After the release of the 1932 movie, at which time Trail was already dead, Capone reportedly sent some of his men to question screenwriter Ben Hecht after Capone was offended at the movie's portrayal of him by actor Paul Muni.

== Other works ==
Trail also wrote numerous pulp stories, supposedly even whole magazines of them, It has been speculated that Trail wrote under a variety of pseudonyms.

- The Clue in the Mail – Mystery Magazine, August 1, 1923
- Queered by Queer – Detective Tales, October 1923
- Egan's Hardest Case – Real Detective Tales, June 1924
- The Devilish Contrivance – Mystery Magazine, September 1, 1923
- Hate That Would Not Die – Flynn's, November 1, 1923
- Threads of Guilt – Real Detective Tales and Mystery Stories, February 1925
- The Skeleton of Warwick Manor – Real Detective Tales and Mystery Stories, August–November 1925
- The Royal Street Riddle – Real Detective Tales and Mystery Stories, November 1926
- Dead Game – Real Detective Tales and Mystery Stories, August 1927
- Might – Best Novels, September 1927
- The Morgan Mysteries – The Dragnet Magazine, November 1928-March 1929
- Machine Gun Annie – The Underworld Magazine, February 1929
- Night Hawks – The Underworld Magazine, February 1929
- The Gun-Girl – The Underworld Magazine, March–July 1929
- Racketeer Justice – The Dragnet Magazine, April 1929
- The Sword of Damocles – Spy Stories Vol. 1, #2, April 1929
- The Wolves of Broadway – The Underworld Magazine, August 1929
- The Mark of Death – The Underworld Magazine, November 1929 – January 1930
- Machine Guns – The Dragnet Magazine, January 1930
- Burnt – The Underworld Magazine, February 1930
- Double Toll – The Underworld Magazine, March 1930
- Hi-Jackers – The Underworld Magazine, April 1930
- Death Limited – Complete Underworld Novelettes, Spring 1932
- Broadway Wolves – Complete Underworld Novelettes, Winter 1932
- Flatfoot, Flatfoot – Detective Book Magazine, Fall 1937

== Bibliography ==
- Server, Lee. Encyclopedia of Pulp Fiction Writers. New York, NY (2002)
- Trail, Armitage (1930). Scarface (1ST ed.). D.J. Clode. ASIN B00085TELI.
- Trail, Armitage (1929). The Thirteenth Guest (First ed.). Whitman. ASIN B000KD7C8U.
