= When a Feller Needs a Friend =

1932 film

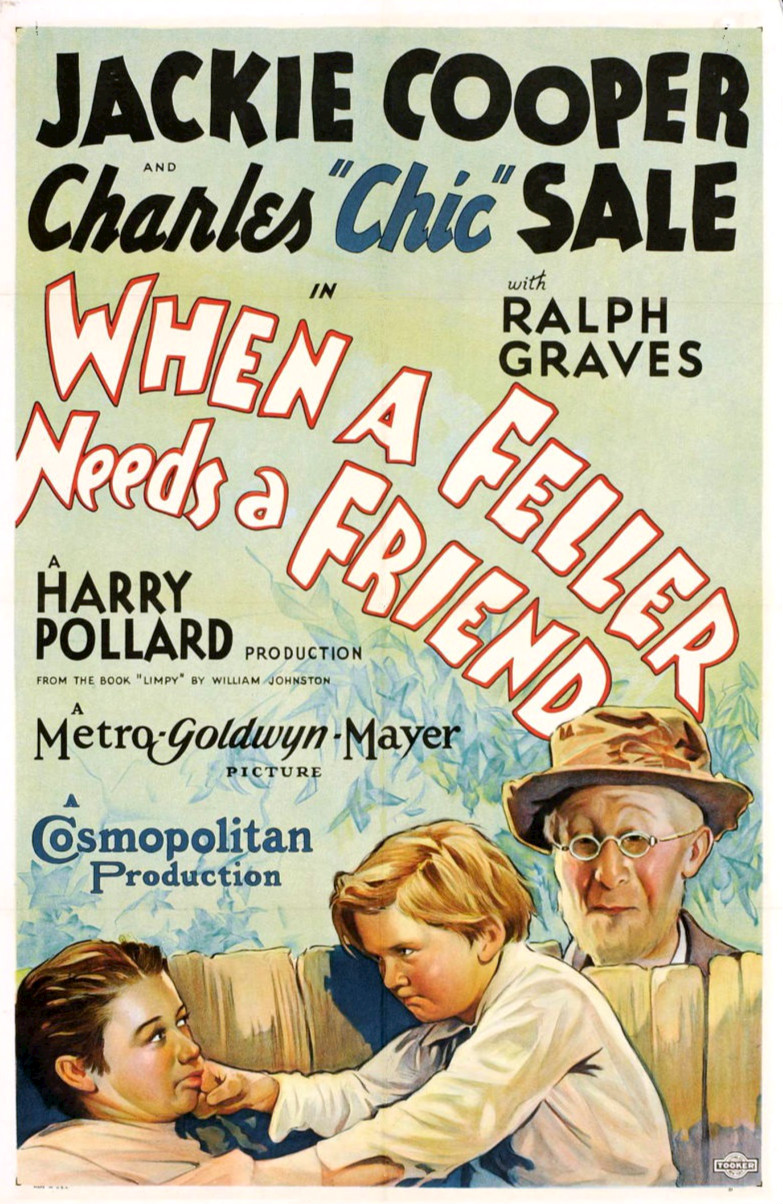
- Theatrical release poster
- Directed by: Harry A. Pollard
- Screenplay by: Frank Butler; Sylvia Thalberg
- Based on: Limpy, the Boy Who Felt Neglected by William Andrew Johnston
- Produced by: Harry A. Pollard
- Starring: Jackie Cooper; Charles "Chic" Sale; Ralph Graves; Dorothy Peterson; Andy Shuford; Helen Parrish
- Cinematography: Harold Rosson
- Edited by: William LeVanway
- Production companies: Cosmopolitan Productions; Metro-Goldwyn-Mayer
- Distributed by: Loew's Inc.
- Release date: April 30, 1932
- Running time: 74 minutes
- Country: United States
- Language: English

When a Feller Needs a Friend is a 1932 American pre-Code drama film directed by Harry A. Pollard and written by Frank Butler and Sylvia Thalberg. The film stars Jackie Cooper, Charles "Chic" Sale, Ralph Graves, Dorothy Peterson, Andy Shuford, and Helen Parrish. The film was released on April 30, 1932, by Metro-Goldwyn-Mayer.

== Plot ==
Eddie wears a leg brace and his mother will not let him play like the other boys. His hope is that a German doctor will be able to operate and fix his leg. When his cousin Froggie comes to live with his family, he is nice to Mr. and Mrs. Randall, but mean to Eddie.

Uncle Jonas sees what is happening, but Eddie's parents do not believe him as Froggie seems so nice. Uncle Jonas tries to make Eddie tougher by teaching him boxing and baseball, but all it does is get Jonas thrown out of the house.

== Cast ==
- Jackie Cooper as Edward Haverford 'Eddie' Randall
- Charles "Chic" Sale as Uncle Jonas Tucker
- Ralph Graves as Mr. Tom Randall
- Dorothy Peterson as Mrs. Margaret Randall
- Andy Shuford as Frederick 'Froggie'
- Helen Parrish as Diana Manning
- Donald Haines as Fatty Bullen
- Gus Leonard as Abraham
- Oscar Apfel as Doctor
