= I'm Nobody's Sweetheart Now =

1940 film by Arthur Lubin

- Theatrical release poster
- Directed by: Arthur Lubin
- Screenplay by: Scott Darling; Erna Lazarus; Hal Block
- Story by: Scott Darling; Erna Lazarus
- Produced by: Joseph Gershenson
- Starring: Dennis O'Keefe; Constance Moore; Helen Parrish
- Cinematography: Elwood Bredell
- Edited by: Paul Landres
- Music by: Charles Previn
- Production company: Universal Pictures
- Distributed by: Universal Pictures
- Release date: November 1, 1940
- Running time: 64 minutes
- Country: United States
- Language: English

I'm Nobody's Sweetheart Now is a 1940 American romantic comedy film directed by Arthur Lubin and starring Dennis O'Keefe, Constance Moore and Helen Parrish. It was produced and distributed by Universal Pictures.

== Plot ==
Football player Tod Lowell is the son of a man running for governor, who needs the support of a political boss. Tod's dad asks a favor, that Tod spend a few weeks squiring Gertrude Morgan, the man's daughter.

Trouble is, Tod's been romantically involved with Betty Gilbert, a nightclub singer, while Gert's gotten engaged to Tod's football rival, Andy Mason. A few tricks are played on the parents to make them believe Tod and Gertrude are serious, but just as they are about to return to their former partners, the two realize they actually have fallen for one another.

== Cast ==
- Constance Moore as Betty Gilbert
- Dennis O'Keefe as Tod Lowell
- Helen Parrish as Gertrude
- Lewis Howard as Andy
- Laura Hope Crews Mrs. Lowell
- Berton Churchill as Sen. Lowell
- Samuel S. Hinds as Morgan
- Margaret Hamilton as Mrs. Thriffie
- Marjorie Gateson as Mrs. Morgan
- Walter Soderling as Abner Thriffle
- Walter Baldwin as Elmer
- Tim Ryan sa Judge Saunders
- Hattie Noel as Bedelia
- Steve Pendleton as Chuck
- Gene O'Donnell as Eddie
- James Craig as Ray
- Rex Evans as Parkins the Butler
- Alphonse Martell as Headwaiter

== Production ==
The film was originally called The Bride Said No. Arthur Lubin was assigned to direct in May 1940. Filming started later that month. Hal Block signed to write some last minute comedy dialogue.

== Reception ==
Diabolique magazine called it "a cheerful comedy... so briskly done and well acted that it doesn’t hit you until the movie’s almost over how selfish the lead couple are – Lubin’s empathy for all his characters possibly threw this off balance because all the audience sympathy goes to the partners of O’Keefe and Parrish."
