= Frances Rich =

American artist (1910–2007)

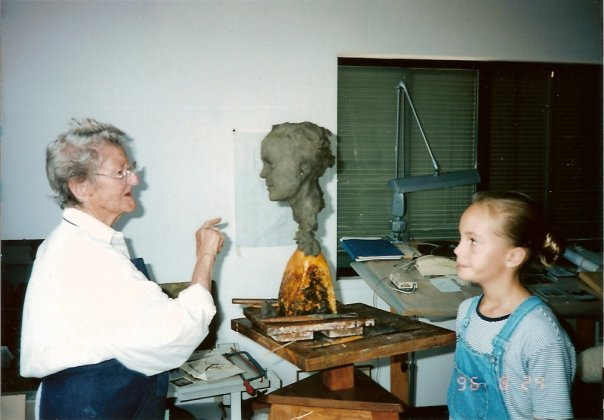
- Frances Rich and Tina Jackson, Rich's last model, 1996
- Born: Irene Frances Luther Deffenbaugh; January 8, 1910; Spokane, Washington, U.S.
- Died: October 14, 2007 (aged 97); Payson, Arizona, U.S.
- Occupations: Actress and sculptor

Signature
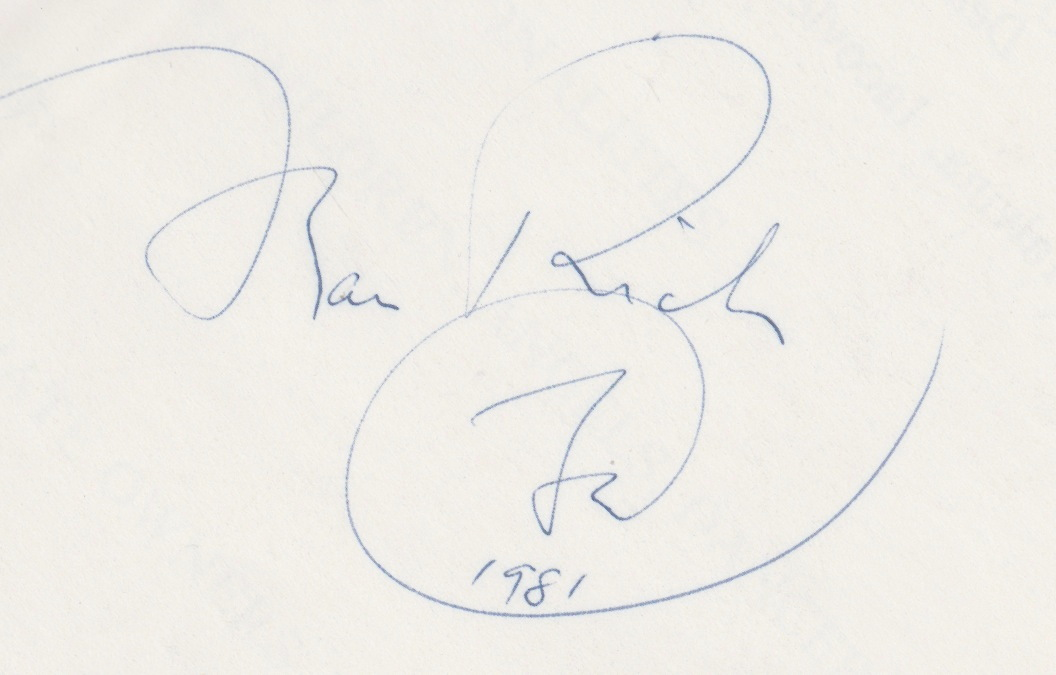

Frances Rich (born Irene Frances Lither Deffenbaugh; January 8, 1910 – October 14, 2007) was an American actress, artist, and sculptor. She was the daughter of actress Irene Rich.

== Early life ==
Frances Rich was born January 8, 1910, in Spokane, Washington, U.S., to silent screen actress Irene Frances Luther Rich and salesman Elvo Elcourt Deffenbaugh. Her step-father was Charles Rich, who adopted her when he married her mother. Rich attended Smith College, from which she graduated in 1931.

== Career ==
=== Acting ===
Rich made her film debut in Diamond Trail (1933), after which she acted in Zoo in Budapest (1933) and Pilgrimage (1933). She also appeared on Broadway in Brief Moment from November 1931 through February 1932.

=== Sculpting ===
Born in Spokane, Washington, Rich received a B.A. from Smith College in 1931. In 1933 she met sculptor, Malvina Hoffman, and studied with her in Paris for two years. Upon returning to America, she did intensive work at the Boston Museum School and established her own studio in New York City. Between 1937 and 1940 she was a resident student at Cranbrook Academy of Art. There she met sculptor Carl Milles, with whom she worked for the next eighteen years.

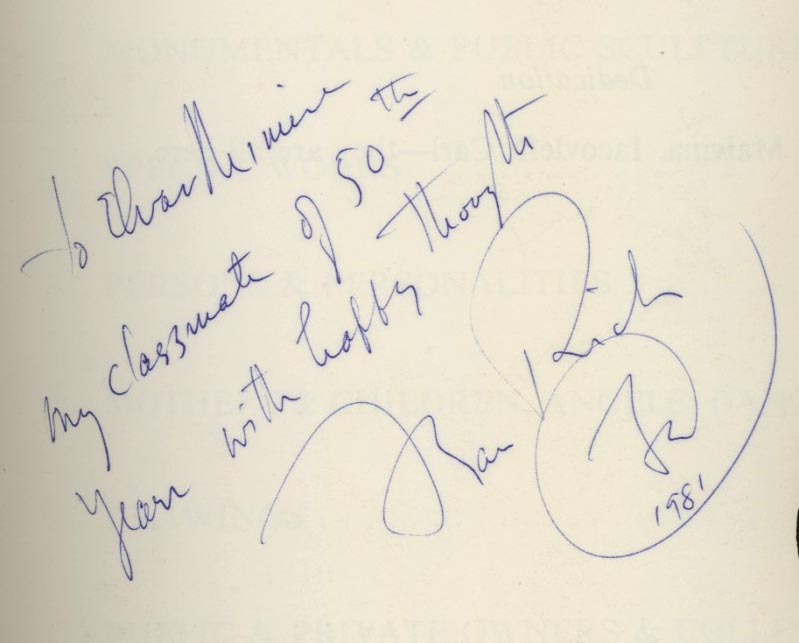
Fran Rich

Her works include portrait busts at Smith College; the Army-Navy Nurse Monument in Arlington National Cemetery in Washington, D.C.; a bronze pelican in front of Pelican Building, University of California, Berkeley; marble bust of Alice Stone Blackwell for the Boston Central Library (featured on the Boston Women's Heritage Trail); and portrait busts of Lotte Lehmann, Margaret Sanger, Diego Rivera, Katharine Hepburn, among others.

Architectural sculpture by Rich includes six monumental limestone bas reliefs at the Purdue University student union building, executed in 1938.

== Death ==
Rich died in Payson, Arizona, on October 14, 2007, aged 97.
