= Scarface (1932 film) =

Film by Howard Hawks

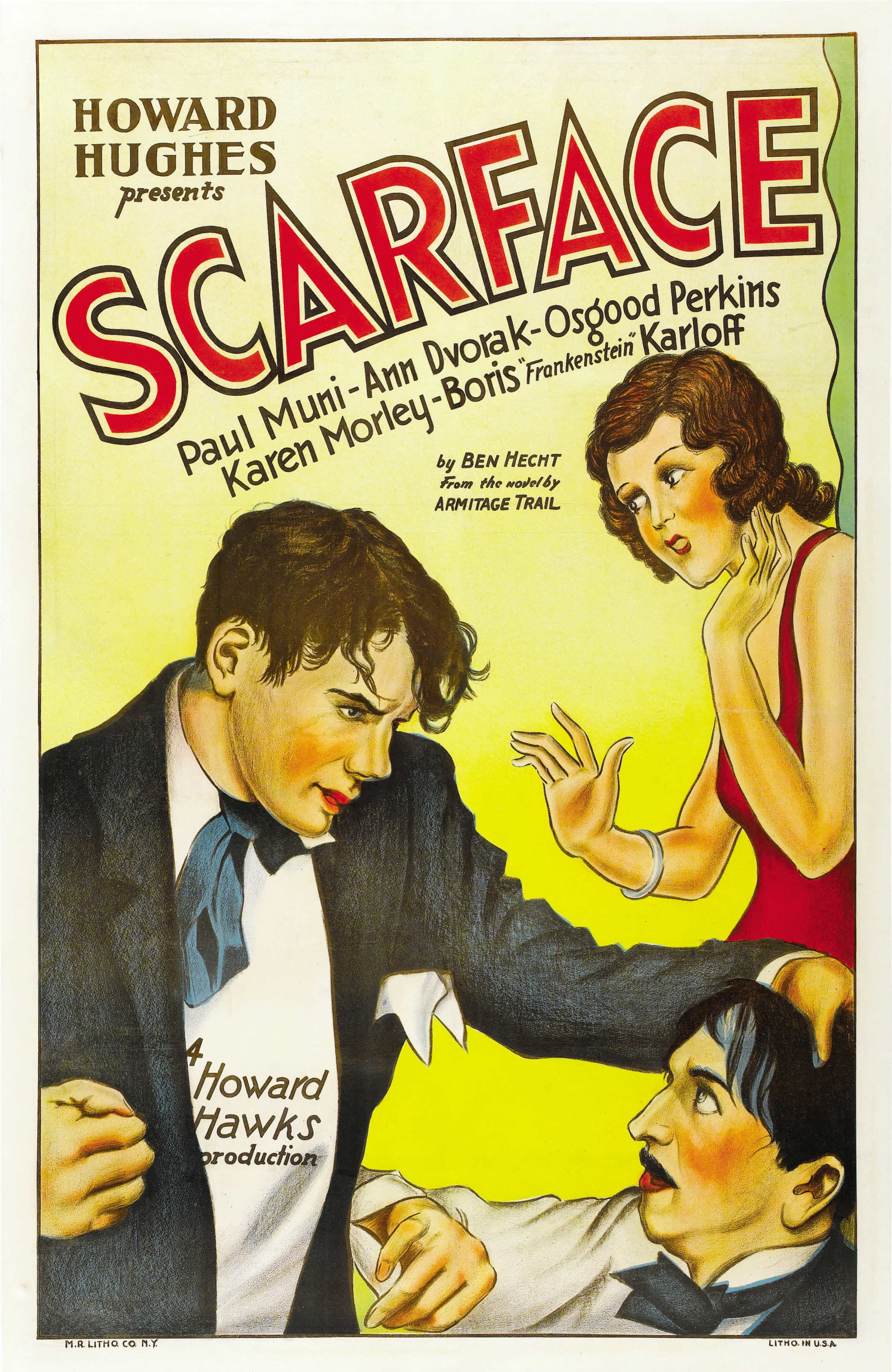
- Theatrical release poster
- Directed by: Howard Hawks
- Screenplay by: W. R. Burnett; John Lee Mahin; Seton I. Miller; Ben Hecht
- Based on: Scarface (1930 novel) by Armitage Trail
- Produced by: Howard Hawks; Howard Hughes
- Starring: Paul Muni; Ann Dvorak; Osgood Perkins; Karen Morley; George Raft; Boris Karloff
- Cinematography: Lee Garmes; L.W. O'Connell
- Edited by: Edward Curtiss
- Music by: Adolf Tandler; Gus Arnheim
- Production company: The Caddo Company
- Distributed by: United Artists
- Release date: April 9, 1932
- Running time: 93 min 95 min (alt.)
- Country: United States
- Language: English
- Budget: $800,000
- Box office: $600,000

Scarface (also known as Scarface: The Shame of the Nation and The Shame of a Nation) is a 1932 American gangster film directed by Howard Hawks and produced by Hawks and Howard Hughes. The screenplay is based loosely on the 1930 novel by Armitage Trail, which in turn was inspired by the life of Al Capone. The pre-Code film stars Paul Muni as Italian immigrant gangster Antonio "Tony" Camonte who violently rises through the Chicago gangland, with a supporting cast that includes George Raft and Boris Karloff. Camonte's rise to power dovetails with his relentless pursuit of his boss's mistress while his sister pursues his best hitman. In an overt tie to the life of Capone, a version of the Saint Valentine's Day Massacre is depicted.

After purchasing the rights to Trail's novel, Hughes quickly selected Hawks to direct and Hecht to write the film's screenplay. Beginning in January 1931, Hecht wrote the script in 11 days. Scarface was produced before the introduction of the Production Code in 1934, which enforced regulations on film content. However, the Hays Code, a more lenient precursor, called for significant alterations, including a prologue condemning gangsters, an alternate ending to more clearly reprehend Camonte, and the alternative title The Shame of a Nation. The censors believed the film glorified violence and crime. These changes delayed the film a year, though some showings retained the original ending. Modern showings of the film have the original ending, though some DVD releases also include the alternate ending as a feature; these versions maintain the changes Hughes and Hawks were required to make for approval by the Hays Office. The film is currently rated PG by the Motion Picture Association (MPA). No completely unaltered version was known to exist until the limited-edition set of Scarface (1983) was released on October 15, 2019.

Audience reception was positive, but censors banned the film in several cities and states, forcing Hughes to remove it from circulation and store it in his vault. The rights to the film were recovered after Hughes died in the 1970s. Alongside Little Caesar and The Public Enemy (both 1931), Scarface is regarded as one of the most significant and influential gangster films.

Scarface was selected for preservation in the National Film Registry in 1994 by the Library of Congress. In 2008, the American Film Institute listed Scarface as the sixth-best gangster film. It was remade as the 1983 film of the same title, directed by Brian De Palma and starring Al Pacino.

== Plot ==
The film's 1979 trailer

In 1920s Chicago, an Italian immigrant and ambitious low-level thug, Tony "Scarface" Camonte, works as a bodyguard for crime lord "Big" Louis Costillo. Tony guns down his boss with Costillo's disgruntled lieutenant, Johnny Lovo. Lovo takes over Costillo's territory in the South Side and has Tony and his associates, the dim-witted Angelo and the handsome playboy Guino "Little Boy" Rinaldo, supervise a lucrative bootlegging operation selling illegal beer to all of the bars there and forcing out rivals.

Tony urges Lovo to start moving in on the North Side, where the bootlegging is controlled by the Irish gangster O'Hara; Lovo refuses, ordering Tony to leave the North Side alone. Tony ignores these orders and removes O'Hara's men while expanding his rackets to the North. Before long, Lovo was only the nominal boss, while Tony became increasingly notorious and powerful, attracting the attention of other gangsters and the police.

Meanwhile, Tony pursues Lovo's girlfriend, Poppy. At first, she is dismissive of him but pays him more attention as his status rises and he starts flaunting his wealth. She visits his "gaudy" apartment, where he shows her his window view of an electric billboard advertising Cook's Tours, which features the slogan that inspires him: "The World Is Yours."

Tony finally gets rid of O'Hara. O'Hara's successor, Tom Gaffney, declares war on the South Side and attempts to kill Tony with tommy guns— with which an excited Tony quickly arms his men. The war results in Tony's victory while Gaffney is forced to go into hiding. A group of prominent citizens, including the police chief, vow to bring Tony down for all the carnage and bloodshed he has inflicted on the city.

During a night out at the theatre, Tony learns that Gaffney and the remainder of his crew are at a nearby bowling alley. Leaving Angelo behind to watch the rest of the show and report back to him the outcome, Tony personally kills Gaffney. Lovo's anger at Tony finally boils over when Tony openly flirts and dances with Poppy in front of him at a nightclub. Tony sees his beloved sister Francesca "Cesca" dancing with a stranger at the club; obsessively protective over her, he becomes enraged and hits her. Later that night, some hired gunmen try to assassinate Tony, but he kills them.

Suspecting Lovo's involvement, Tony goes to his office after bribing the local barber to call him and pretend to be part of the hit crew. When Lovo hangs up after claiming that he must have gotten the wrong number, Tony forces him to confess to the hit and then has Guino kill him. Tony, now the undisputed kingpin of the city's underworld, takes Poppy on an expensive vacation to Florida to escape the police and media attention. At the same time, Cesca secretly visits Guino at Tony's office and seduces him. The two began an affair.

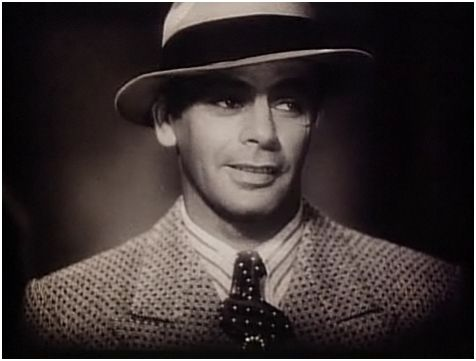
Paul Muni in the trailer for Scarface

Returning home, Tony learns from his mother, who has often warned him of his bad behavior, that Cesca has moved in with another man and rushes over to find her with Guino. He kills his friend in a jealous rage, and Cesca runs away in tears after revealing that they had just gotten married and were planning to surprise him. The police issue a warrant for Tony's arrest; he barricades himself in his home while Angelo is killed trying to protect him in a shootout with the police.

Cesca slips inside, planning to kill her brother, but can't bring herself to do it. Tony and Cesca arm themselves, and Tony shoots at the police from the window with a Thompson submachine gun, laughing maniacally as he guns them down. Moments later, however, Cesca is killed by a stray bullet. Calling Cesca's name as the apartment fills with tear gas, Tony stumbles down the stairs just as the police break down his door. Tony pleads for his life, but instead of putting on the offered handcuffs, he tries to escape, resulting in him being shot. As Tony falls dead on the street, the electric billboard blazes "The World Is Yours" above him.

== Cast ==
- Paul Muni as Antonio "Tony" Camonte
- Ann Dvorak as Francesca "Cesca" Camonte
- George Raft as Guino "Little Boy" Rinaldo
- Karen Morley as Poppy
- Boris Karloff as Tom Gaffney
- Osgood Perkins as John "Johnny" Lovo
- C. Henry Gordon as Police Inspector Ben Guarino
- Vince Barnett as Angelo
- Purnell Pratt as Publisher Garston
- Porter Hall as Managing Editor
- Inez Palange as Mrs. Camonte, Tony's Mother
- Edwin Maxwell as Chief of Detectives
- Harry J. Vejar as "Big" Louis Costillo (uncredited)
- Howard Hawks as Man on Bed (uncredited)

== Production ==
=== Development ===
Business tycoon Howard Hughes, then involved in film-making, wanted a box-office hit after the success of his 1931 film The Front Page. Gangster films were topical in the early 1930s in the age of Prohibition. Hughes wanted to make a film based on the life of gangster Al Capone superior to all other films in the genre. He was advised against making the film, as the genre was crowded; Little Caesar starring Edward G. Robinson and The Public Enemy starring James Cagney were already box-office successes, and Warner Bros. claimed nothing new could be done with the gangster genre. Furthermore, industry censors such as the Hays Office were becoming concerned with the glamorization of crime in media.

Hughes bought the rights to Armitage Trail's novel Scarface, inspired by the life of Capone. Trail wrote for many detective story magazines during the early 1920s, but died of a heart attack at the age of 28, shortly before the release of Scarface. Hughes hired Fred Pasley, a New York reporter and authority on Capone, as a writer. Hughes asked Ben Hecht, who had won the first Academy Award for Best Original Screenplay in 1929 for his silent crime film Underworld, to be head writer. Suspicious of Hughes as an employer, Hecht requested a daily salary of $1,000, to be paid every day at six o'clock. Hecht claimed he would only waste a day's labor if Hughes was a fraud.

Hughes wanted film director Howard Hawks to direct and co-produce. This surprised Hawks, as the two had never been friendly; Hughes had filed a lawsuit against Howard Hawks in July 1930, alleging that Hawks's film The Dawn Patrol had plagiarized his film Hell's Angels. Over a game of golf, Hughes promised to drop the lawsuit (irrelevant as the judge had already dismissed it). By the 18th hole, Hawks had become interested in directing the film. He became more convinced when he discovered Hecht would be the head writer. Hecht and Hawks worked well together, intending to portray the Capone character as of the Borgia Family, including the suggestion of incest between the main character and his sister, present in Trail's novel.

=== Writing ===
Hecht wrote the screenplay in 11 days in January 1931, adapted from Trail's novel. Fred Pasley provided additional writing, as well as W. R. Burnett, author of the novel Little Caesar. Pasley's contributions included elements of the book Al Capone: Biography of a Self-Made Man; the book contains a barbershop scene with Capone similar to the introduction of Tony Camonte in the film. Pasley was not credited for his work on the screenplay. John Lee Mahin and Seton I. Miller rewrote the script for continuity and dialogue.

Because there were five writers, it is difficult to distinguish which components were contributed by which writer; however, the ending of Scarface is similar to Hecht's first gangster film Underworld, in which gangster Bull Weed traps himself in his apartment with his lover and fires at the hordes of police outside, and thus was likely a Hecht contribution.

The film version of Scarface bears little resemblance to the novel. Though the film contains the same major characters, plot points, and incestual undertones, changes were made to reduce the length and the number of characters, and to satisfy the requests of censorship offices. To make gangsters appear less admirable, Tony's character was made to appear less intelligent and more brutish than in the novel. Similarly, the sibling relationship between Tony and the police officer was removed to avoid depicting police corruption.

==== Ties to Capone ====
The film and novel are loosely based on the life of gangster Al Capone, whose nickname was "Scarface". The names of characters and locations were changed. Capone became Camonte, Torrio became Lovo, and Moran became Doran. In some early scripts, Colosimo was Colisimo and O'Bannion was Bannon, but the names were changed to Costillo and O'Hara, respectively. This and other alterations made to characters and identifying locations to maintain anonymity were due to censorship and Hawks's concern about the overuse of historical details.

Ben Hecht had met Capone and "knew a lot about Chicago", so he did no research for the script. According to Hecht, while working on the script, Capone sent two men to visit him in Hollywood to ensure the film was not based on his life. He told them the Scarface character was a parody of numerous people, and that the title was chosen as it was intriguing. The two left Hecht alone.

The references to Capone and actual events from the Chicago gang wars were obvious to audiences at the time. Muni's character had a scar similar to Capone's, received in similar fights. The police in the film mention Camonte is a member of the Five Points Gang in Brooklyn, of which Capone was a known member. Tony kills his boss "Big Louis" Costillo in the lobby of his club; Capone was involved in the murder of his first boss "Big Jim" Colosimo in 1920. Rival boss O'Hara is murdered in his flower shop; Capone's men murdered Dean O'Bannion in his flower shop in 1924. The assassination of seven men in a garage, with two of the gunmen costumed as police officers, mirrors the St. Valentine's Day Massacre of 1929. The leader of this rival gang narrowly escapes the shooting, as did gang leader Bugs Moran. The film opens at the intersection of 22nd Street and Wabash Avenue in the middle of Capone's South Side, the site of many of Capone's crimes.

Despite the explicit references to Capone, it was rumored that he liked the film so much that he owned a print of it. However, this was likely an exaggerated claim by Hawks as Capone was imprisoned in Atlanta for tax evasion during the film's release.

=== Casting ===
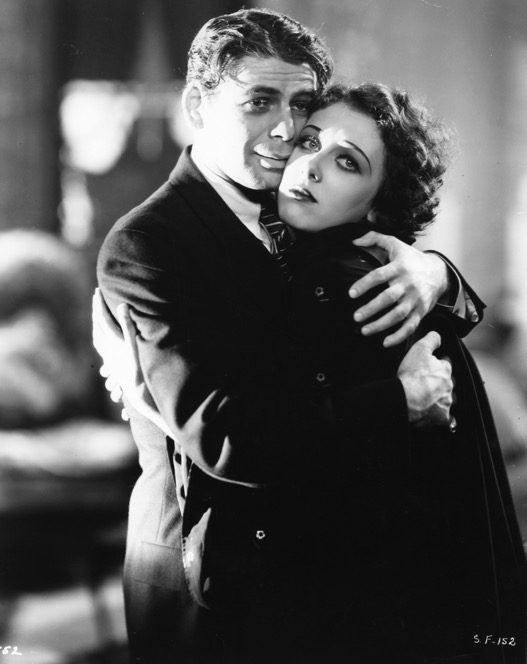
Paul Muni and Ann Dvorak in Scarface

Hawks and Hughes found casting difficult as most actors were under contract and studios were reluctant to allow their artists to freelance for independent producers. Producer Irving Thalberg suggested Clark Gable, but Hawks believed Gable was a personality, not an actor. After seeing Paul Muni on Broadway, talent agent Al Rosen suggested him for the lead role. Muni initially declined, feeling he was not physically suited for the role, but after reading the script, his wife, Bella, convinced him to take it. After a test run in New York, Hughes, Hawks, and Hecht approved Muni for the role.

Boris Karloff was cast as Irish gangster Gaffney, listed on a theatrical release poster as "Boris 'Frankenstein' Karloff". Jack La Rue was cast as Tony Camonte's sidekick Guino Rinaldo (modeled after Al Capone's bodyguard Frank Rio). Still, as he was taller than Muni, Hawks worried he would overshadow Muni's tough Scarface persona. He was replaced with George Raft, a struggling actor, when Hawks encountered him at a prizefight. Raft had played an almost identical part the previous year as his feature film debut in Quick Millions, a gangster film starring Spencer Tracy, but the Scarface role would catapult Raft to stardom.

Though Karen Morley was under contract at MGM, Hawks was close with MGM studio executive Eddie Mannix, who loaned out Morley for the film. She was reportedly given the choice between the role of Poppy or Cesca. Though Cesca was the stronger role, she chose Poppy as she felt Cesca would be a better fit for her friend Ann Dvorak. She considered this "probably the nicest thing [she] did in [her] life". Morley invited 20-year-old Dvorak to a party at Hawks' house to introduce them. According to Hawks, at the party, Dvorak zeroed in on George Raft, who played her love interest. He initially declined her invitation to dance. She tried to dance in front of him to lure him; eventually, he gave in, and their dance together stopped the party. After this event, Hawks was interested in casting her but had reservations about her lack of experience. After a screen test, he gave her the part, and MGM was willing to release her from her contract as a chorus girl. Dvorak had to both receive permission from her mother Anna Lehr and to win a petition presented to the Superior Court to be able to sign on with Howard Hawks as a minor.

=== Filming ===
Filming lasted six months, which was long for films made in the early 1930s. Howard Hughes remained off-set to avoid interfering with the filming of the movie. Hughes urged Hawks to make the film visually exciting by adding car chases, crashes, and machine-gun fire. Hawks shot the film at three different locations: Metropolitan Studios, Harold Lloyd Studios, and the Mayan Theater in Los Angeles. Filming took 3 months, with the cast and crew working 7 days a week. For the most violent scene of the film in the restaurant, Hawks cleared the set to avoid harming extras and had the set fired on by machine guns. The actors acted out the scene in front of a screen with the shooting projected in the back, so as everyone crowded under the tables in the restaurant, the room appeared to be simultaneously under fire.

Hawks and Hughes met with the Hays Office during filming to discuss revisions. Despite that, Scarface was filmed and put together quickly. In September 1931, a rough cut of the film was screened for the California Crime Commission and police officials, neither of whom thought the movie was a dangerous influence for audiences or would elicit a criminal response. Irving Thalberg was given an advanced screening and was impressed by the film. Despite the positive feedback the film was given, the Hays Office was insistent on changes before final approval.

=== Censorship ===
Scarface was produced and filmed during the pre-Code era of Hollywood, which spanned from 1930 to 1934. The pre-Code era is characterized by its informal and haphazard screening and regulation of film content, before the establishment of the Production Code Administration (PCA) on July 1, 1934. Before the influence of the PCA, censorship was overseen by the Motion Pictures Producers and Distributors of America (MPPDA). In 1930, Will Hays, the chairman of the MPPDA, attempted to regulate the content of movies; the MPPDA became known as the Hays Office. The goal of the Hays Office was to censor nudity, sexuality, drug use, and crime. More specific to Scarface, the Hays Office wanted to avoid the sympathetic portrayal of crime by either showing criminals recognizing the error of their ways or showing criminals getting punished. The Hays Office, however, did not have authority to remove material from a film until the MPPDA officially pledged to adhere to the Production Code in 1934, so they relied on delaying film release and lobbying to remove scenes or prevent movies from being produced. Films evaded the Hays Office by adding extremely suggestive scenes so they could remove them and satisfy the Hays Office enough that they would overlook the lesser immoralities that remained in the film.

J. E. Smyth described Scarface as "one of the most highly censored films in Hollywood history". Howard Hawks believed the Hays Office had personal vendettas against the movie, while Hughes believed the censorship was due to "ulterior and political motives" of corrupt politicians. However, James Wingate of the New York censor boards rebutted that Hughes was preoccupied with "box-office publicity" in producing the film. After repeated demands for a script rewrite from the Hays Office, Hughes ordered Hawks to shoot the film: "Screw the Hays Office, make it as realistic, and grisly as possible." The Hays Office was outraged by Scarface when they screened it. According to the Hays Office, Scarface violated the Code because the film elicited sympathy for Muni's character, revealing to youth a successful method of crime. The Hays Office called for scenes to be deleted, scenes to be added to condemn gangsterism, and a different ending. They believed Tony's death at the film's end was too glorifying. In addition to the violence, the MPPDA felt that an inappropriate relationship between the main character and his sister was too overt, especially when he holds her in his arms after he slaps her and tears her dress; they ordered this scene to be deleted. Hughes, to receive the MPPDA's approval, deleted the more violent scenes, added a prologue to condemn gangsterism, and wrote a new ending.

In addition, a couple of scenes were added to overtly condemn gangsterism, such as a scene in which a newspaper publisher looks at the screen and directly admonishes the government and the public for their lack of action in fighting against mob violence and a scene in which the chief detective denounces the glorification of gangsters. Hawks refused to shoot the extra scenes and the alternate ending. They were directed by Richard Rosson, earning Rosson the title of "co-director". Hughes was instructed to change the title to The Menace, Shame of the Nation or Yellow to clarify the subject of the film; after months of haggling, he compromised with the title Scarface: The Shame of the Nation and by adding a foreword condemning "gangsters" in a general sense. Hughes attempted to release the film under the title "The Scar" when the Hays office disallowed the original title. Besides the title, the term "Scarface" was removed from the film. In the scene where Tony kills Rinaldo, Cesca says the word "murderer", but she can be seen mouthing the word "Scarface".

The original script had Tony's mother loving her son unconditionally, praising his lifestyle, and even accepting his money and gifts. In addition, there was a politician who, despite campaigning against gangsters on the podium, is shown partying with them after hours. The script ends with Tony staying in the building, unaffected by tear gas and a multitude of bullets fired at him. After the building is set on fire, Tony is forced to exit, guns blazing. He is sprayed with police gunfire but appears unfazed. Upon noticing the police officer who had been arresting him throughout the film, he fires at him, only to hear a single "click" noise implying his gun is empty. He is killed after the police officer shoots him several times. A repeated clicking noise is heard on the soundtrack, implying he was attempting to fire while dying.

=== Alternate ending ===
The film's first version (Version A) was completed on September 8, 1931, but censors required the ending to be modified or they would refuse to grant Scarface a license. Paul Muni could not re-film the ending in 1931 due to his work on Broadway. Consequently, Hawks was forced to use a body double. The body double was mainly filmed through shadows and long shots to mask Muni's absence in these scenes. The alternate ending (Version B) differs from the original ending in the manner that Tony is caught and in which he dies. Unlike the original ending, where Tony tries to escape from the police and dies after being shot several times, in the alternate ending, Tony reluctantly hands himself over to the police. After the encounter, Tony's face is not shown. A scene follows where a judge is addressing Tony during sentencing. The next scene is the finale, in which Tony (seen from a bird's eye view) is brought to the gallows and hanged.

However, Version B did not pass the New York and Chicago censors. Howard Hughes felt the Hays Office had suspicious intentions in rejecting the film because Hays was friends with Louis B. Mayer. Hughes believed censorship was to prevent wealthy, independent competitors from producing films. Confident his film could stand out among audiences more than Mayer's films, Hughes organized a press showing of the film in Hollywood and New York. The New York Herald Tribune praised Hughes for his courage in opposing the censors. Hughes disowned the censored film, and finally, in 1932, Version A with the added text introduction was released in states that lacked strict censors (Hughes attempted to take the New York censors to court). This 1932 release version led to bona fide box-office status and positive critical reviews. Hughes was successful in subsequent lawsuits against the boards that censored the film. Due to criticism from the press, Hays claimed the version shown in theaters was the censored film he had previously approved.

=== Music ===
Due to the film's urban setting, nondiegetic music (not visible on the screen or implied to be present in the story) was not used in the film. The only music that appears in the film is during the opening and closing credits and during scenes where music appears naturally in the film's action, such as in the nightclub. Adolf Tandler served as the film's musical director, while Gus Arnheim served as the orchestra's conductor. Gus Arnheim and his Cocoanut Grove Orchestra perform "Saint Louis Blues" by W.C. Handy and "Some of These Days" by Shelton Brooks in the nightclub. The tune Tony whistles in the film is the sextet from Gaetano Donizetti's opera Lucia di Lammermoor. This tune is accompanied by words that translate to, "What restrains me in such a moment?", and this tune continues to appear during violent scenes in the movie. The song Cesca sings while playing the piano is "Wreck of the Old 97".

=== Cultural references ===
The serious play Tony and his friends go to see, leaving at the end of Act 2, is John Colton and Clemence Randolph's Rain, based on W. Somerset Maugham's story "Miss Sadie Thompson". The play opened on Broadway in 1922 and ran throughout the 1920s. (A film version of the play, also titled Rain and starring Joan Crawford, was released by United Artists the same year as Scarface.) Though relatively inconspicuous in the film, and unnoticed by most viewers, the Camonte family was meant to be partially modeled after the Italo-Spanish Borgia family. This was most prominent through the subtle and arguably incestuous relationship Tony Camonte and his sister share. Camonte's excessive jealousy of his sister's affairs with other men hint at this relationship. Coincidentally, Donizetti wrote the opera for Lucrezia Borgia, about the Borgia family, and Lucia di Lammermoor from where Tony Camonte's whistle tune comes.

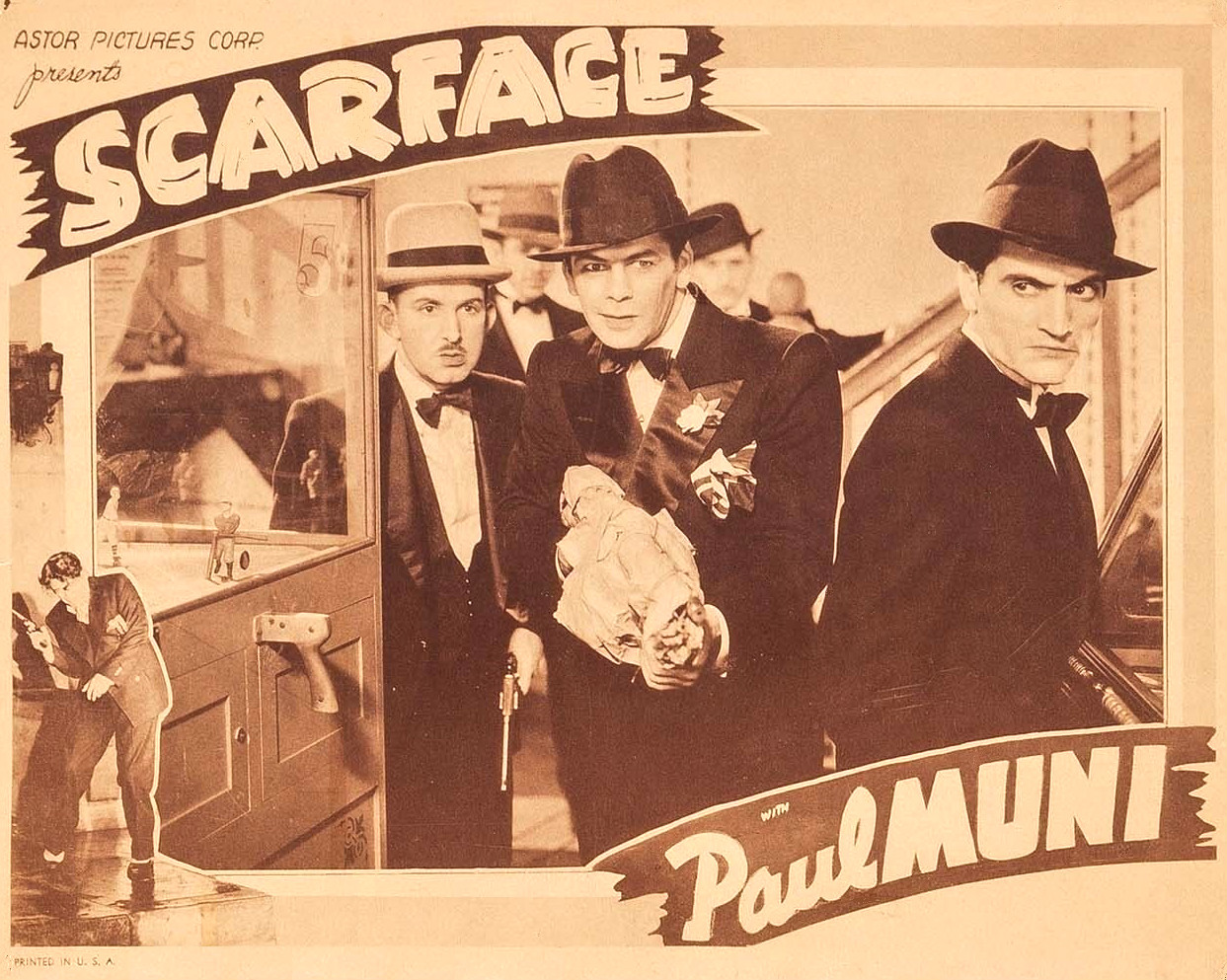
Promotional card for the film

== Release ==
After battling with censorship offices, the film was released around a year later than The Public Enemy and Little Caesar. Scarface was released in theaters on April 9, 1932. Hughes planned a grand premiere in New York, but the New York censor boards rejected the film's showing. State censorship boards in Ohio, Virginia, Maryland, and Kansas, and citywide censorship boards in Detroit, Seattle, Portland, and Chicago banned the film. Hughes threatened to sue censorship boards for preventing the release of his film, much to the approval of the New York Herald Tribune. Each state had a different board of censors, which allowed Hughes to release the film in areas without strict censorship. At the request of Will Hays, Jason Joy convinced the strict censor boards to allow the release of Scarface, because the Hays Office acknowledged and appreciated the changes Hughes made to the film. Joy visited state censor boards individually, stating that while the Hays Office was against the positive portrayal of crime, gang films were documentaries against gangster life. Joy was successful, and eventually all state and municipal censorship boards allowed Scarface to be released, accepting only the cut and censored version of Scarface.

== Reception ==
Upon release, audiences were generally positive. According to George Raft, who met Al Capone a few times at casinos, even Capone himself liked the film adding, "you tell 'em that if any of my boys are tossin' coins, they'll be twenty-dollar gold pieces." Variety cited Scarface as having "that powerful and gripping suspense which is in all gangster pictures is in this one in double doses and makes it compelling entertainment", and that the actors play, "as if they'd been doing nothing else all their lives". The National Board of Review named Scarface as one of the best pictures of 1932. However, at the time of release in 1932, there was a general public outcry about this motion picture and the gangster genre in general, which negatively affected the film's box-office receipts. Jack Alicoate gave Scarface a scathing review in The Film Daily, stating that the violence and subject matter of the film left him with, "the distinct feeling of nausea". He goes on to say the film "should never have been made" and showing the film would "do more harm to the motion picture industry, and everyone connected with it, than any picture ever shown". Although Ben Hecht was often critical of his work for Hollywood, he admitted that Scarface was "the best-directed picture [he has] seen". Hecht did, however, criticize Muni's performance. Having known Al Capone, Hecht claimed that Muni portrayed Capone as too "silent" and "moody", more similar to "Hitler". Some critics disagreed with the casting of British actor Boris Karloff, believing his accent was out of place in a gangster film; a New York Times article stated "his British accent is hardly suitable to the role". However, other critics considered him a high point. The film earned $600,000 at the box office, and while Scarface was more financially successful than Hughes's other films at the time, due to the significant cost of production, it is unlikely the film did better than break even.

The film initiated outrage among Italian organizations and individuals of Italian descent, remarking on a tendency of filmmakers to portray gangsters and bootleggers in their films as Italian. In the film, an Italian American makes a speech condemning gangster activities; this was added later in production to appease censors. This, however, did not prevent the Italian embassy from disapproving Scarface. Believing the film to be offensive to the Italian community, the Order Sons of Italy in America formally denounced the film and other groups urged community members to boycott the film and other films derogatory towards Italians or Italian-Americans. Will Hays wrote to the ambassador in Italy, excusing himself from scrutiny by stating the film was an anachronism because it had been delayed in production for two years and was not representative of the current practice of censorship at the time. Nazi Germany permanently prohibited showings of the film. Some cities in England banned the film as well, believing the British Board of Film Censorship's policy on gangster films was too lax. The film had been banned in Ireland on August 19, 1932, and on August 29, 1941, (under the alternate title of 'Gang War'). The decisions were upheld by the Films Appeal Board each time. It was banned on April 24, 1953, (under its original title). No appeal was lodged. Various reasons include pandering to sensationalism, glamorizing the gangster lifestyle and implying an incestuous relationship between the protagonist and his sister.

Several cities in the United States, including Chicago, and some states refused to show the film. The magazine Movie Classics ran an issue urging the people to demand to see the film at theaters despite the censorship bans. The film broke box-office records at the Woods Theatre in Chicago after premiering Thanksgiving Day, November 20, 1941, after having been banned from showing in Chicago by censors for nine years. Despite the favorable reception of the film among the public, the censorship battles and the unflattering reviews from some press contributed to the film's generally poor performance at the box-office. Upset at the inability to make money from Scarface, Howard Hughes removed the film from circulation. The film remained unavailable until 1979 except for occasional release prints of suspect quality from questionable sources. Hughes had plans in 1933 to direct and produce a sequel to Scarface, but due to stricter censorship rules, the film was never made.

Based on a sampling of 52 reviews on Rotten Tomatoes, Scarface holds a 98% rating. The critics' consensus reads: "This Scarface foregoes his "little friend" and packs a different kind of heat, blending stylish visuals, thrilling violence, and an incredible cast." Metacritic, which uses a weighted average, assigned the film a score of 90 out of 100, based on 12 critics, indicating "universal acclaim".

=== Industry reception ===
In 1994, Scarface was selected for preservation in the United States National Film Registry by the Library of Congress as being "culturally, historically, or aesthetically significant". The character of Tony Camonte ranked at number 47 on AFI's 100 Years... 100 Heroes and Villains list. The film was named the best American sound film by critic and director Jean-Luc Godard in Cahiers du Cinéma. In June 2008, the American Film Institute revealed its "Ten Top Ten"—the best ten films in ten "classic" American film genres—after polling over 1,500 people from the creative community. Scarface was acknowledged as the sixth best in the gangster film genre. The 1983 version was placed 10th, making Scarface the only film to make the same "10 Top 10" list as its remake.

== Analysis ==
Scholars debate whether Scarface classifies as a film with historical significance or a Hollywood gangster-era motion picture. Its historical significance was augmented by the film's writing credits: W. R. Burnett, author of gangster novel Little Caesar from which the film of the same name was based on; Fred D. Pasley, a prominent Chicago gangland historian; and Ben Hecht, an ex-Chicago reporter. Events similar to the assassination of Jim Colismo and the St. Valentine's Day Massacre contribute to the film's realism and authenticity. Film critic Robert E. Sherwood stated that the film "merits...as a sociological or historical document", and "an utterly inexcusable attempt has been made to suppress it—not because it is obscene...but because...it comes too close to telling the truth."

=== Excess ===
According to film studies professor Fran Mason, excess is a prominent theme in the film. The opening of the film sets the stage as Big Louie Costillo sits in the remnants of a wild party, convincing his friends his next party will be bigger, better, and have "much more everything". This indicates the excessive life of a gangster, whether in pleasure or violence. The death scene of Costillo sets the next tone of excess. In this scene, the audience sees only the shadow of Tony Camonte with a gun, hears the shots, and the sound of the body hitting the floor. The violent scenes become more severe as the film progresses. Most of the violence in the film is shown through montage, as scenes go by in sequence, showing the brutal murders that Tony and his gang commit, such as roughing up bar owners, participating in a drive-by bombing, and massacring 7 men against a wall. A scene shows a peel-off calendar rapidly changing dates while being shot by a machine gun, making the excessive violence clear. The violence is not only perpetrated by the gangsters. The police in the final scene with Tony and Cesca spare no effort to catch the notorious Camonte siblings, visible through the disproportionate number of police officers and cars surrounding the apartment complex to apprehend one man. Tony and the police's excessive use of violence throughout the film normalizes it. An element of parody underlies Tony's abnormal joy in using Tommy guns. In the scene in the restaurant in which men from the North Side gang attempt to shoot Tony with a Tommy, he obtains pleasure from the power. Rather than cowering beneath the tables, he tries to peek out to watch the guns in action, laughing maniacally from his excitement. He reacts jovially upon getting his first Tommy gun and enthusiastically leaves to "write [his] name all over the town with it in big letters".

The gangster's excessive consumption is comically represented through Tony's quest to obtain expensive goods and show them off. In Tony's first encounter with Poppy alone on the staircase, he boasts about his new suit, jewelry, and bulletproof car. Poppy largely dismisses his advances, calling his look "kinda effeminate". His feminine consumption and obsession with looks and clothes are juxtaposed by his masculine consumption, which is represented by his new car. Later, Tony shows Poppy a stack of new shirts, claiming he will wear each shirt only once. His awkwardness and ignorance of his exorbitance make this Gatsby-style scene more comical than serious. His consumption symbolizes the disintegration of values of modernity, represented explicitly by his poor taste and obsession with money and social status. Tony's excess transcends parody and becomes dangerous because he represents a complete lack of restraint that ultimately leads to his downfall.

Tony's excess is manifested in the gang wars in the city. He is instructed to leave O'Hara, Gaffney, and the rest of the North Side gang alone. He disobeys because he lusts for more power, violence, and territory. Not only does he threaten the external power structure of the gangs concerning physical territory, but he also disrupts the internal power structure of his gang by blatantly disobeying his boss, Johnny Lovo. Gaffney's physical position juxtaposes Tony's position. Throughout the film, Gaffney's movement is restricted by both the setting and the implication because of the crowded spaces he is shown onscreen and his troupe of henchmen, with whom he is constantly surrounded. Tony can move freely at the film's beginning, becoming progressively more crowded until he is as confined as Gaffney. Henchmen surround him and cannot move as freely throughout the city. This, however, is self-imposed by his excessive desire for territory and power.

The theme of excessiveness is further exemplified by Tony's incestuous desires for his sister, Cesca, whom he attempts to control and restrict. Their mother acts as the voice of reason, but Tony does not listen to her, subjecting his family to the excess and violence he brings upon himself. His lust for violence mirrors Cesca's lust for sexual freedom, symbolized by her seductive dance for Rinaldo at the club. Rinaldo is torn between his loyalty to Tony and his passion for Cesca, symbolizing the power struggle between the Camonte siblings. Rinaldo is a symbol of Tony's power and prominence; his murder signifies Tony's lack of control and downfall, which ends in Tony's death.

=== American Dream ===
Camonte's rise to prominence and success is modeled after the American Dream, but more overtly violent. As the film follows the rise and fall of an Italian gangster, Tony becomes increasingly more Americanized. When Tony appears under the towel at the barbershop, this is the first time the audience sees his face. He appears foreign with a noticeable Italian accent, slicked hair, and an almost Neanderthal appearance, evident by the scars on his cheek. As the movie progresses, he becomes more Americanized as he loses his accent and his suits change from gaudy to elegant. By the film's end, his accent is hardly noticeable. Upon the time of his death, he had accumulated many "objects" that portray the success suggested by the American Dream: his secretary, a girlfriend of significant social status (more important even is that she was the mistress of his old boss), as well as a fancy apartment, big cars, and nice clothes. Camonte exemplifies that one can succeed in America by following Camonte's motto: "Do it first, do it yourself, and keep on doin' it." On the other hand, Camonte represents the American urge to reject modern life and society, rejecting Americanism. The gangster strives for the same American Dream as anyone else, but approaches it in a way at odds with modern societal values, through violence and illicit activity.

=== Gangster territory ===
Control of territory is a theme in the gangster film genre in a physical sense and on the movie screen. Tony works to control the city by getting rid of competing gangs and gaining physical control of the city, and he likewise gains control of the movie screen in his rise to power. This is most evident in scenes and interactions involving Tony, Johnny, and Poppy. In an early scene in the film, Tony comes to Johnny's apartment to receive his payment after killing Louie Costillo. Two rooms are visible in the shot: the main room, where Tony sits, and the room in the background where Poppy sits and where Johnny keeps his money. Lovo goes into the back room, but Tony does not, so this room represents Johnny's power and territory. The men sit across from each other in the scene, with Poppy in the middle of them in the background, representing the trophy they are both fighting for. However, they both appear equally in the shot, representing their equality of power. Later, in the nightclub scene, Tony sits between Poppy and Johnny, showing he is in control through his centrality in the shot. He has gained the most power and territory, as indicated by "winning" Poppy.

=== Fear of technology ===
Scarface represents the American fears and confusion that stemmed from the technological advancement of the time: whether technological advancement and mass production should be feared or celebrated. An overall anxiety post-World War I was whether new technology would cause ultimate destruction, or whether it would help make lives easier and bring happiness. In the film, Tony excitedly revels in the possibilities machine guns can bring by killing more people, more quickly, and from further away. This represents the question of whether or not mass production equals mass destruction or mass efficiency.

=== Objects and gestures ===
The use of playful motifs throughout the film showcased Howard Hawks's dark comedy, which he expressed through his directing. In the bowling alley scene, where rival gang leader Tom Gaffney was murdered, when Gaffney throws the ball, the shot remains on the last standing bowling pin, which falls to represent the death of kingpin Tom Gaffney. In the same scene, before the death of Gaffney, a shot shows an "X" on the scoreboard, foreshadowing Gaffney's death. Hawks used the "X" foreshadowing technique throughout the film (seen first in the opening credits) which were chiefly associated with death appearing many times (but not every scene) when a death is portrayed; the motif appears in numerous places, most prominently as Tony's "X" scar on his left cheek. The motifs mock the life of the gangster. The gangster's hat is a common theme throughout gangster films, specifically Scarface, as representative of conspicuous consumption. Hawks included hand gestures, a common motif in his films. In Scarface, George Raft was instructed to repetitively flip a coin, which he does throughout the film.

=== "The World Is Yours" ===
Camonte's apartment looks out on a neon, flashing sign that says "The World Is Yours". This sign represents the modern American city as a place of opportunity and individualism. As attractive as the slogan is, the message is impossible, yet Tony does not understand this. The view from his apartment represents the rise of the gangster. When Camonte is killed in the street outside his building, the camera pans up to show the billboard, representative of the societal paradox of the existence of opportunity, yet the inability to achieve it. According to Robert Warshow, the ending scene represents how the world is not ours, but not his either. The gangster's death momentarily releases us from the concept of success and the need to succeed. Regarding the theme of excess, the sign is a metaphor for the dividing desires created by modernity, seen through the lens of the excessive desires of the gangster persona.

=== Style ===
"Sharp" and "hard-edged", Scarface set the visual style for the gangster films of the 1930s. Hawks created a violent, gripping film by strongly contrasting black and white in his cinematography. For example, dark rooms, silhouettes of bodies against drawn shades, and pools of carefully placed light. Much of the film takes place at night. The tight grouping of subjects within the shot and stalking camera movement followed the course of action in the film. The cinematography is dynamic and characterized by highly varied camera placement and mobile framing.

=== Italian-language versions ===
In 1946, after World War II and softened relations between Italy and the United States, Titanus, an Italian film production company, was interested in translating Scarface into Italian. Initially, upon requesting approval from the Italian film office, the request was rejected due to censorship concerns regarding the portrayal of violence and crime throughout the film. There was no initial concern about the film's portrayal of Italians. Titanus appealed to the Italian film office, calling Scarface "one of the most solid and constructive motion pictures ever produced overseas. They lobbied to bring in a foreign language film to help domestic film producers save money in the Italian economy, damaged by the recent war. After receiving approval at the end of 1946, Titanus translated a script for dubbing the film. One difference in the Italian script is that the characters' names were changed from Italian-sounding to more American-sounding. For example, Tony Camonte was changed to Tony Kermont, and Guino Rinaldo was changed to Guido Reynold. This and several other changes were made to remove references to Italians.

Another example is the difference in the scene in the restaurant with Tony and Johnny. In the American version, Tony makes a comical statement about the garlic in the pasta. In contrast, in the Italian translation, the food in question is a duck liver pâté, a less overtly Italian reference to food. Moreover, in the American version, the gangsters are referred to as illegal immigrants by the outraged community; however, in the Italian dubbed version, the citizen status of the criminals are not mentioned, merely the concern of repeat offenders.

The film was redubbed into Italian in 1976 by the broadcasting company Radio Televisione Italiana (RAI). Franco Dal Cer translated the script, and the dub was directed by Giulio Panicali. Pino Locchi dubbed the voice of Tony Camonte for Paul Muni, and Pino Colizzi dubbed the voice of Gunio Rinaldo for George Raft. A difference between the 1947 and 1976 versions is that all of the Italian names and cultural references were untouched from the original American script. The 1976 version celebrates the Italian backgrounds of the characters, adding noticeably different Italian dialects to specific characters. This version of the dubbed film translates the opening and closing credit scenes as well as the newspaper clippings shown into Italian; however, the translation of the newspaper clippings was not done with particular aesthetic care.

The film was redubbed in the 1990s and released on Universal's digital edition. According to scholarly consensus, the 1990 dub combines re-voicing and reusing audio from the 1976 redub.

== Legacy ==
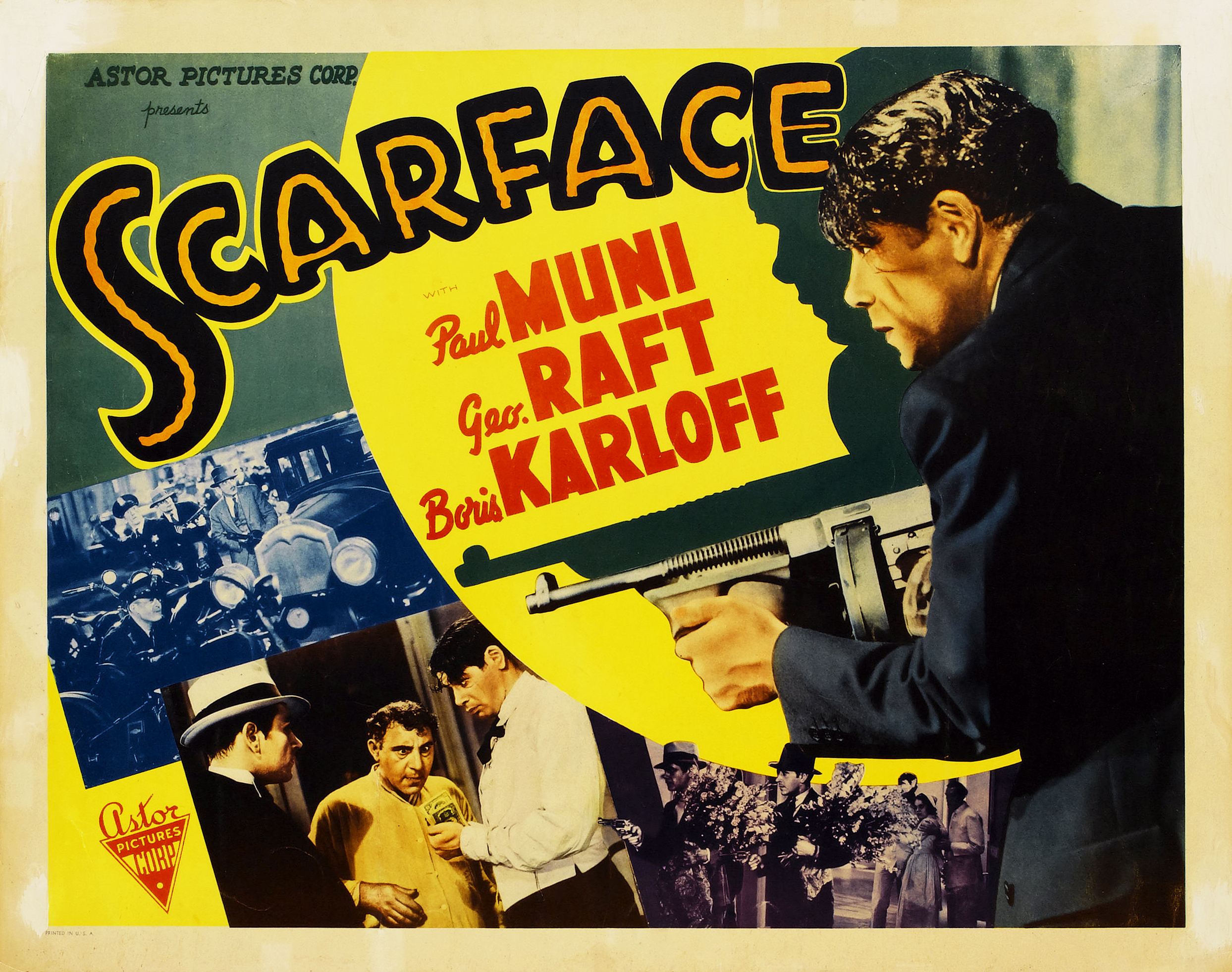
1932 Lobby card

Despite being unsuccessful at the box office, Scarface was one of the most discussed films of 1932 due to its subject matter and its struggle and triumph over censor boards. Scarface is cited (often with Little Caesar and The Public Enemy) as the archetype of the gangster film genre, because it set the early standard for the genre which continues to appear in Hollywood. However, Scarface was the last of the three big gangsters films of the early 1930s, as the outrage at the pre-Code violence caused by the three films, particularly Scarface, sparked the creation of the Production Code Administration in 1934. Howard Hawks cited Scarface as one of his favorite works, and the film was a subject of pride for Howard Hughes. Hughes locked the film in his vaults a few years after release, refusing many profitable offers to distribute the film or to buy its rights. In 1979, three years after his death, Summa Corporation, which controlled his estate, sold the rights to Scarface, along with seven other films to Universal Pictures, which sparked the 1983 remake starring Al Pacino. Though rare for a remake, the 1983 version was also critically acclaimed.

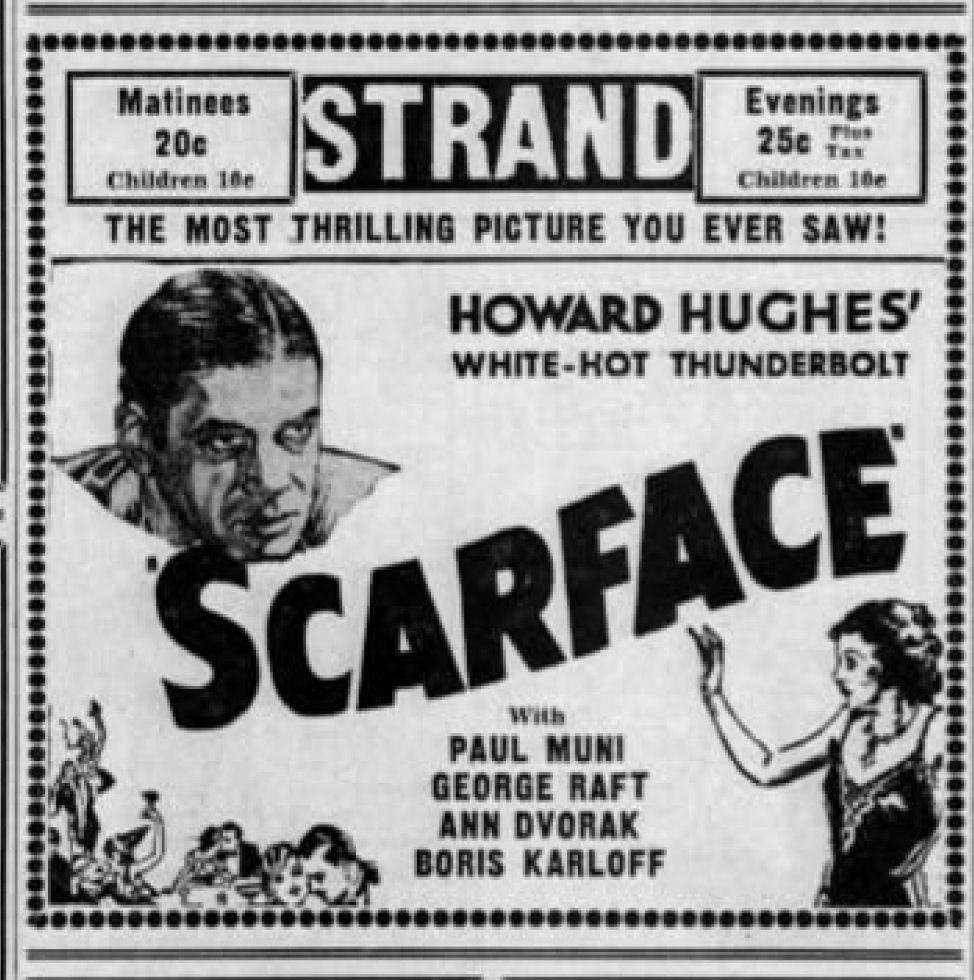
1940 Re-release newspaper ad

Paul Muni's performance in Scarface as "the quintessential gangster anti-hero" contributed greatly to his rapid ascent into his acclaimed film career. Paul Muni received significant accolades for his performance as Tony Camonte. Critics praised Muni for his robust and fierce performance. Al Pacino stated Paul Muni greatly inspired him. Muni influenced his performance in the 1983 Scarface remake. However, despite the impressive portrayal of a rising gangster, critics claim the character minimally resembled Al Capone. Unlike Camonte, Capone avoided grunt work and typically employed others to do his dirty work for him. Moreover, Muni's Scarface at the end revealed the Capone character to be a coward as he pleaded for mercy and tried to escape before getting shot in the street. Capone was not known for his cowardice and did not die in battle.

Scarface was Ann Dvorak's best-known film. The film launched Raft's lengthy career as a leading man. In the film's second lead, Raft had learned to flip a coin without looking at it, a character trait, and he made a strong impression in the comparatively sympathetic but colorful role. Howard Hawks told Raft to use this in the film to camouflage his lack of acting experience. A reference is made in Raft's later role as gangster Spats Columbo in Some Like It Hot (1959), wherein he asks a fellow gangster (who is flipping a coin) "Where did you pick up that cheap trick?"

Scarface may have influenced gangster life 4 years after the film was released. In 1936, Jack McGurn, who was thought to be responsible for the St. Valentine's Massacre depicted in the film, was murdered by rivals in a bowling alley.

=== Home media ===
The film was one of the first films released on video by MCA Videocassette in May 1980. The film was released on DVD on May 22, 2007, and was rereleased on August 28, 2012, in celebration of the 100th anniversary of Universal Studios, by Universal Pictures Home Entertainment. Both DVD versions include an introduction by Turner Classic Movies host and film historian Robert Osborne and the film's alternate ending. On video and on television, the film maintains Hawks's original ending but still contains the other alterations he was required to make during filming. A completely unaltered and uncensored version of the film was not known to exist until the limited-edition set of Scarface (1983) was released on October 15, 2019. In 2024, a new 4K restoration was created from a 35mm duplicate negative, and given a 4K/Blu-ray release by The Criterion Collection on November 12, 2024.

=== Related films ===
After the rights for Scarface were obtained after the death of Howard Hughes, Brian de Palma released a remake of the film in 1983 featuring Al Pacino as Scarface. The film was set in contemporary 1980s Miami in the Hispanic underworld and is known for its inclusion of graphic violence and obscene language, considered "as violent and obscene for the 1980s" as the original film was considered for 1930s cinema. The 2003 DVD "Anniversary Edition" limited-edition box set of the 1983 film includes its 1932 counterpart. At the end of the 1983 film, a title reading "This film is dedicated to Howard Hawks and Ben Hecht" appears over the final shot.

Universal announced in 2011 that the studio has been developing a new version of Scarface in multiple starts and stops. The studio claims the new film is neither a sequel nor a remake, but will take elements from both the 1932 and the 1983 version, including the basic premise of a man who becomes a kingpin in his quest for the American Dream. In 2016, Antoine Fuqua was in talks to direct the remake, but left the project the following year in February, with the Coen brothers rewriting the script. Universal later hired David Ayer to direct and contracted Diego Luna to star, but dismissed Ayer because his script was too violent. In 2018, Fuqua was back on the project, but left again in May 2020. Instead, Luca Guadagnino signed on to direct the film, with the script from the Coen brothers. In November 2023, Guadagnino announced that he was no longer attached to direct the remake.

Scarface is often associated with other pre-code crime films released in the early 1930s such as The Doorway to Hell (1930), Little Caesar (1931) and The Public Enemy (1931). According to Fran Mason of the University of Winchester, Scarface is more similar to the film The Roaring Twenties than its early 1930s gangster film contemporaries because of its excess.

== Bibliography ==
- Aaker, Everett (2013). The Films of George Raft. McFarland & Company. p. 24.
- Ashbrook, William (1965). Donizetti. London: Cassell & Company.
- Balio, Tino (2009). United Artists: The Company Built by the Stars. Madison: University of Wisconsin Press. p. 111. ISBN 978-0-299-23004-3.
- Barlett, Donald L.; Steele, James B. (1979). Howard Hughes: His Life & Madness. New York: W.W. Norton & Company. ISBN 0-393-32602-0.
- Benyahia, Sarah Casey (2012). Crime. Abingdon, Oxon: Routledge. ISBN 978-0-415-58141-7.
- Bergreen, Laurence (1994). Capone: The Man and the Era. New York: Simon & Schuster. p. 49. ISBN 978-0-671-74456-4.
- Black, Gregory D. (1994). Hollywood Censored: Morality Codes, Catholics, and the Movies. Cambridge, UK: Cambridge University Press. p. 126. ISBN 978-0-521-45299-1.
- Bojarski, Richard; Beale, Kenneth (1974). The Films of Boris Karloff. Secaucus, New Jersey: The Citadel Press. ISBN 0-8065-0396-3.
- Bookbinder, Robert (1985). Classic Gangster Films. New York: Citadel Press. pp. 21–24. ISBN 978-0-8065-1467-3.
- Brookes, Ian, ed. (2016). Howard Hawks: New Perspectives. London: Palgrave. ISBN 978-1-84457-541-1.
- Brown, Peter Harry; Broeske, Pat H. (1996). Howard Hughes: The Untold Story. New York: Dutton. ISBN 0-525-93785-4.
- Clarens, Carlos (1980). Crime Movies: From Griffith to the Godfather and Beyond. Toronto: George J. McLeod Ltd. ISBN 978-0-393-00940-8.
- Danks, Adrian (2016). "'Ain't There Anyone Here for Love?' Space, Place and Community in the Cinema of Howard Hawks". In Brookes, Ian (ed.). Howard Hawks: New Perspectives. London: Palgrave. p. 46. ISBN 978-1-84457-541-1.
- Doherty, Thomas (1999). Pre-Code Hollywood: Sex, Immorality, and Insurrection in American Cinema 1930-1934. New York: Columbia University Press. ISBN 978-0-231-11094-5.
- Eagan, Daniel (2010). America's Film Legacy: The Authoritative Guide to the Landmark Movies in the National Film Registry. New York: Continuum. p. 192. ISBN 978-0-8264-1849-4. "Harry J. Vejar scarface."
- Fetherling, Doug (1977). The Five Lives of Ben Hecht. Lester and Orpen Limited. ISBN 978-0-919630-85-7.
- Godard, Jean Luc (1972). Godard on Godard: Critical Writings. New York: Viking Press. ISBN 0-670-34277-7.
- Grieveson, Lee; Sonnet, Esther; Stanfield, Peter, eds. (2005). Mob Culture: Hidden Histories of the American Gangster Film. New Brunswick, NJ: Rutgers University Press. ISBN 978-0-8135-3556-2.
- Grønstad, Asbjørn (2003). "Mean Streets: Death and Disfiguration in Hawks's 'Scarface'". Nordic Journal of English Studies. 2 (2): 385. doi:10.35360/njes.143.
- Guerif, Francois (1979). Le Film Noir Americain. Artigues-pres-Bordeaux: Editions Henri Veyrier. pp. 48–52. ISBN 978-2-85199-206-2.
- Gunter, Barrie (2018). Predicting Movie Success at the Box Office. Cham, Switzerland: Palgrave Macmillan. ISBN 978-3-319-71803-3.
- Hagemann, E.R. (1984). "Scarface: The Art of Hollywood, Not "The Shame of a Nation"". The Journal of Popular Culture. 18 (Summer): 30–40. doi:10.1111/j.0022-3840.1984.1801_30.x.
- Hagen, Ray; Wagner, Laura (2004). Killer Tomatoes: Fifteen Tough Film Dames. Jefferson, North Carolina: McFarland & Company, Inc. p. 52. ISBN 978-0-7864-1883-1.
- Hecht, Ben (1954). A Child of the Century. New York: Simon and Schuster. pp. 486–487.
- Hossent, Harry (1974). The Movie Treasury Gangster Movies: Gangsters, Hoodlums and Tough Guys of the Screen. London: Octopus Books Limited. ISBN 978-0-7064-0370-1.
- Keating, Carla Mereu (2016). "'The Italian Color': Race, Crime Iconography and Dubbing Conventions in the Italian-language Versions of "Scarface" (1932)". Altre Modernita (Ideological Manipulation in Audiovisual Translation): 107–123. doi:10.13130/2035-7680/6851.
- Langman, Larry; Finn, Daniel (1995). A Guide to American Crime Films of the Thirties. Westport, CT: Greenwood Press. pp. 227–228. ISBN 978-0-313-29532-4.
- MacAdams, William (1990). Ben Hecht: The man behind the legend. Scribner. p. 128. ISBN 978-0-684-18980-2.
- Martin, Jeffrey Brown (1985). Ben Hecht: Hollywood Screenwriter. Ann Arbor, Michigan: UMI Research Press. ISBN 978-0-8357-1571-3.
- Mason, Fran (2002). American Gangster Cinema: From Little Caesar to Pulp Fiction. New York: Palgrave Macmillan. ISBN 978-0-333-67452-9.
- Mast, Gerald (1982). Howard Hawks, storyteller. New York: Oxford University Press. ISBN 0-19-503091-5.
- Mate, Ken; McGilligan, Pat; White, Dennis L. (1983). "Burnett". Film Comment. 19 (1). ProQuest 195362394.
- McCarthy, Todd (1997). Howard Hawks: The Grey Fox of Hollywood. New York: Grove Press. ISBN 0-8021-3740-7.
- McCarty, John (1993). Hollywood Gangland: The Movies' Love Affair with the Mob. New York: St. Martin's Press. ISBN 978-0-312-09306-8.
- McElhaney, Joe (Spring–Summer 2006). "Howard Hawks: American Gesture". Journal of Film and Video. 58 (1–2): 31–45. ProQuest 2170419.
- Neale, Steve (2016). "Gestures, Movements and Actions in Rio Bravo". In Brookes, Ian (ed.). Howard Hawks: New Perspectives. London: Palgrave. p. 110. ISBN 978-1-84457-541-1.
- Parish, James Robert; Pitts, Michael R. (1976). Taylor, T. Allan (ed.). The Great Gangster Pictures. Metuchen, NJ: The Scarecrow Press, Inc. p. 347. ISBN 978-0-8108-0881-2.
- Pauly, Thomas H. (1974). "Film: What's Happened to the Western Movie?". Western Humanities Review. 38 (3). ProQuest 1291779855.
- Phillips, Gene D. (1999). Major Film Directors of the American and British Cinema (Revised ed.). Associated University Presses. p. 46. ISBN 978-0-934223-59-1.
- Rice, Christina (2013). Ann Dvorak: Hollywood's Forgotten Rebel. Lexington, KT: The University Press of Kentucky. ISBN 978-0-8131-4426-9.
- Roberts, Marilyn (2006). "Scarface, The Great Gatsby, and the American Dream". Literature/Film Quarterly. 34 (1). ProQuest 226996909.
- Server, Lee (2002). Encyclopedia of Pulp Fiction Writers. New York: Checkmark Books. pp. 258–259. ISBN 978-0-8160-4577-8.
- Silver, Alain; Ursini, James, eds. (2007). Gangster Film Reader. Pompton Plains, New Jersey: Limelight Editions. p. 261. ISBN 978-0-87910-332-3.
- Slowik, Michael (2014). After the Silents: Hollywood Film Music in the Early Sound Era, 1926–1934. New York: Columbia University Press. p. 229. ISBN 978-0-231-53550-2.
- Smith, Jim (2004). Gangster Films. London: Virgin Books. ISBN 978-0-7535-0838-1.
- Smyth, J.E. (2006). Reconstructing American Historical Cinema: From Cimarron to Citizen Kane. Lexington, Kentucky: The University Press of Kentucky. ISBN 978-0-8131-2406-3.
- Smyth, J.E. (2004). "Revisioning modern American history in the age of "Scarface" (1932)". Historical Journal of Film, Radio and Television. 24 (4): 535–563. doi:10.1080/0143968042000293865. S2CID 191492240.
- Springhall, John (2004). "Censoring Hollywood: Youth, moral panic and crime/gangster movies of the 1930s". The Journal of Popular Culture. 32 (3): 135–154. doi:10.1111/j.0022-3840.1998.3203_135.x.
- Thomas, Tony (1985). Howard Hughes in Hollywood. Secaucus, NJ: Citadel Press. ISBN 978-0-8065-0970-9.
- Vasey, Ruth (1996). "Foreign Parts: Hollywood's Global Distribution and the Representative of Ethnicity". In Couvares, Francis G. (ed.). Movie Censorship and American Culture. Washington & London: Smithsonian Institution Press. ISBN 978-1-56098-668-3.
- Vaughn, Stephen (2006). Freedom and Entertainment: Rating the Movies in an Age of New Media. New York: Cambridge University Press. p. 111. ISBN 0-521-67654-1. "scarface 1983 critically acclaimed."
- Vieria, Mark A. (2003). Sin in Soft Focus: Pre-Code Hollywood. Harry N. Abrams. ISBN 978-0-8109-8228-4.
- Wallace, Stone (2015). George Raft - The Man Who Would Be Bogart. Albany, Georgia: BearManor Media. ISBN 978-1-59393-123-0.
- Warshow, Robert (March–April 1954). "Movie Chronicle: The Westerner". Partisan Review. 21 (2): 191.
- Yablonsky, Lewis (1974). George Raft. McGraw-Hill Book Company. ISBN 978-0-07-072235-4.
- Yogerst, Chris (June 20, 2017). "Hughes, Hawks, and Hays: The Monumental Censorship Battle Over Scarface (1932)". The Journal of American Culture. 40 (2): 134–144. doi:10.1111/jacc.12710.

=== Further reading ===
- Cavallero, Jonathan J.; Plasketes, George (2004). "Gangsters, Fessos, Tricksters, and Sopranos: The Historical Roots of Italian American Stereotype Anxiety". Journal of Popular Film and Television. 32 (2): 50–73. doi:10.3200/JPFT.32.2.49-73. ISSN 0195-6051. S2CID 144052558.
- Klemens, Nadine (2006). Gangster mythology in Howard Hawks' "Scarface - Shame of the nation". GRIN Verlag. ISBN 978-3-638-47698-0.
- Majumdar, Gaurav (2004). ""I Can't See": Sovereignty, Oblique Vision, and the Outlaw in Hawks's Scarface". CR: The New Centennial Review. 4 (1): 211–226. doi:10.1353/ncr.2004.0024. ISSN 1539-6630. S2CID 145050454.
