= Bernard W. Burton =

American film editor

- Born: December 24, 1898; New York City, New York, USA
- Died: February 26, 1991 (aged 92); Woodland Hills, Los Angeles, California, USA
- Occupation: film editor
- Years active: 1928–1968

Bernard W. Burton (December 24, 1898 – February 26, 1991) was an American film editor with more than forty credits in feature films and television, and dozens of additional credits as the supervising editor for television programs in the 1960s. He was responsible for editing James Whale’s 1936 version of Show Boat and a string of B-movies throughout the 1930s and 1940s.

Burton was nominated for the Academy Award for Best Film Editing for his work on One Hundred Men and a Girl (1937), which was directed by Henry Koster. Burton edited six films directed by Koster between 1937 and 1941, all produced by Universal Pictures.

From 1942 to 1953 Burton has nearly 30 credits as the associate producer of films. With the coming of the 1950s, he migrated to television and worked on such shows as Burke's Law and The Big Valley. He retired around 1968. He died at the age of 92 in 1991.

== Filmography ==
- Give Out, Sisters
