= Steven Bauer =

American actor (born 1956)

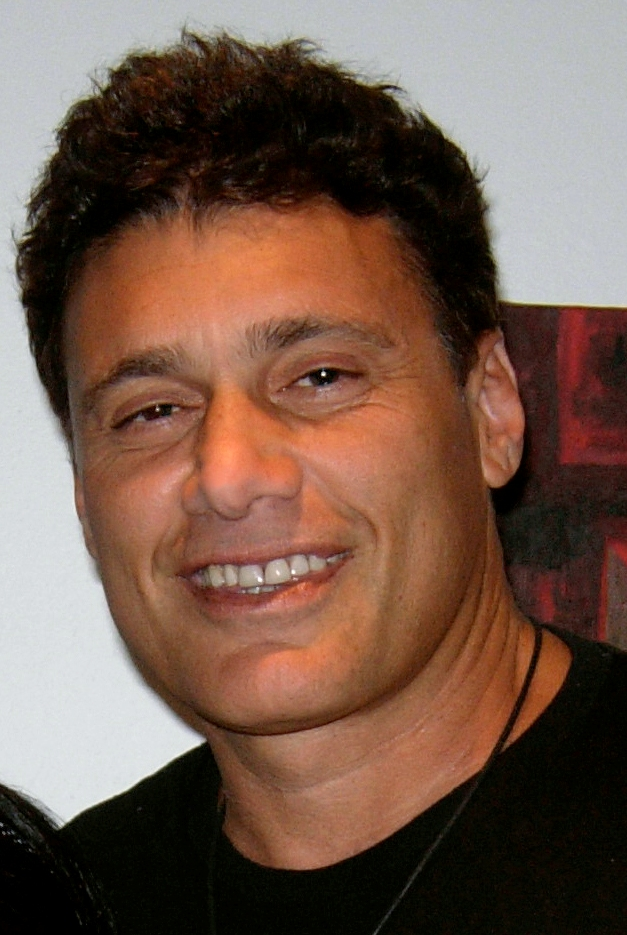
- Bauer in 2008
- Born: Esteban Ernesto Echevarría Samson; December 2, 1956 (age 69); Havana, Cuba
- Other name: Rocky Echevarría
- Education: University of Miami
- Occupation: Actor
- Years active: 1977–present
- Known for: Scarface (1983); Breaking Bad (2011); Ray Donovan (2013–2017); Better Call Saul (2017–2022)
- Spouses: Melanie Griffith (m. 1981; div. 1989); Ingrid Anderson (m. 1989; div. 1991); Christiana Boney (m. 1992; div. 2002); Paulette Miltimore (m. 2003; div. 2012)
- Children: 2
- Awards: Screen Actors Guild Award for Outstanding Performance by a Cast in a Motion Picture

Steven Bauer (born Esteban Ernesto Echevarría Samson; December 2, 1956) is a Cuban-American actor.

Bauer began his career on PBS, portraying Joe Peña, the son of Cuban immigrants on the situation comedy ¿Qué Pasa, USA? (1977–1979). He played Manolo "Manny" Ribera, the best friend and right-hand man of Cuban drug lord Tony Montana, in the 1983 crime drama Scarface, and his performance earned him widespread critical acclaim and drew a nomination for the Golden Globe Award for Best Supporting Actor – Motion Picture.

He received further recognition in 2000 as part of the multi-narrative ensemble cast of Steven Soderbergh's crime drama Traffic, sharing in the Screen Actors Guild Award for Outstanding Performance by a Cast in a Motion Picture. He later played Don Eladio Vuente in the crime dramas Breaking Bad (2011) and Better Call Saul (2017–2022), and the retired Mossad agent Avi Rudin in the crime drama Ray Donovan (2013–2017).

== Early life and education ==
Bauer was born Esteban Ernesto Echevarría Samson, on December 2, 1956, in Havana, Cuba, the son of Lillian Samson Agostini, a schoolteacher, and Esteban Echevarría, a commercial pilot who worked for Cubana Airlines. Bauer's maternal grandfather, whose family names were Samson and Bauer, was Jewish, and immigrated to Cuba from Germany, a refugee looking to United States he married a Cuban of Italian descent.

Bauer's family emigrated from Cuba to the United States on Independence Day, 1960, when he was three years old, shortly after the end of the Cuban Revolution, settling in Miami, Florida. Once in the United States, he began using the name Steven, an English form of his given name, Esteban. He graduated from Miami Coral Park High School in 1974 and went on to study acting at Miami Dade Community College and then at the theatre department of University of Miami, where he befriended Ray Liotta.

== Acting career ==
=== 1979–99 ===
Bauer's first substantial role was in the PBS bilingual sitcom ¿Qué Pasa, USA?, playing the teenage son of a Cuban exile family in Miami, from 1977 to 1979. He also appeared in the 1980 TV miniseries From Here to Eternity. He was credited in these and a few other early projects as Rocky Echevarría. In 1981, Bauer starred in the television movie She's in the Army Now, where he met his first wife, actress Melanie Griffith. They both moved to New York City and stayed at Ray Liotta's apartment, while Liotta moved to Los Angeles and stayed at theirs. Both Bauer and Griffith studied under acting teacher Stella Adler, and he appeared in several off-Broadway productions. During this time he adopted the stage name Steven Bauer.

Bauer was given the role of Manny Ribera (the part played by George Raft in the original 1932 version) in the 1983 epic crime drama movie Scarface, even though (like Raft) he was a relatively unknown actor at the time. The producers of Scarface were convinced that he was right for the role based on his strong audition, as well as his authentic Cuban background. His performance earned him widespread critical acclaim, and drew a Golden Globe nomination for Best Supporting Actor.

In 1986 he had two other important roles. The first was as Det. Frank Sigliano in the Billy Crystal and Gregory Hines buddy cop action comedy Running Scared. The second was as an Israeli soldier named Avner in the 1986 Canadian CTV television movie Sword of Gideon, which tells the story of Mossad agents hunting down terrorists in the aftermath of the 1972 Munich massacre. The Sword of Gideon script was the basis for Steven Spielberg's later 2005 historical drama film Munich, which follows the same storyline and borrows heavily from the Sword of Gideon story and script. In 1990 Bauer played the role of DEA agent Enrique "Kiki" Camarena in the television crime drama miniseries Drug Wars: The Camarena Story alongside Benicio Del Toro and Craig T. Nelson. That same year, Bauer took over the series lead of the crime drama television show Wiseguy from Ken Wahl for the fourth and final season, playing U.S. Attorney Michael Santana after Wahl's character disappears.

=== 2000–present ===
Since then, Bauer has made his career primarily, though not exclusively, in action films and crime dramas on both the big and small screens, including the movie The Lost City where he served in a minor role alongside the film's star and director Andy Garcia. He also appeared in the motion pictures Primal Fear and the crime drama Traffic (2000), for which he shared the Screen Actors Guild Award for Outstanding Performance by a Cast in a Motion Picture.

In 2007 he appeared on an episode of Burn Notice. In 2011, Bauer appeared on the crime drama series Breaking Bad playing Mexican drug lord Don Eladio. He garnered significant praise from critics for his portrayals in both Breaking Bad and its prequel Better Call Saul.

He starred with Julianne Michelle in the 2013 feature film Awakened, a supernatural horror film in which Bauer's performance was met with mixed-to-negative critical reactions from mainstream publications.

More recently, Bauer appeared as ex-Mossad agent turned private investigator Avi in the Showtime crime drama series Ray Donovan. Bauer also reprised his Breaking Bad role in 2017 in AMC's prequel series Better Call Saul. In addition, he played El Santo in the crime drama American version of Queen of the South.

== Personal life ==
Bauer has married four times: first to Melanie Griffith, from 1981 until 1989; second to Ingrid Anderson, from 1989 until 1991; third to Christiana Boney, from 1992 until 2002; and fourth to Paulette Miltimore, from 2003 until 2012. He has two sons: Alexander Griffith Bauer (born August 22, 1985) with Griffith, and Dylan Dean Steven Bauer (born May 14, 1990) with Anderson.

In 2010, Bauer was mistakenly named as the driver of a vehicle that struck and killed 24-year-old Brent Rosenberg of Malibu. Rosenberg was walking on Pacific Coast Highway toward his parked car on the east side of the road when he was struck by a sport utility vehicle. Initial reports said Bauer was the driver of the vehicle but police officials later said it was a different person of the same name.

== Filmography ==
=== Film ===
Year	Film	Role	Notes
1981	She's in the Army Now	Nick Donato	TV movie
1982	An Innocent Love	Duncan Widders	TV movie
1983	Valley Girl	Guy in Pink Shirt	
1983	Scarface	Manolo "Manny Ray" Ribera	
1984	Body Double	Assistant Director	
1984	Thief of Hearts	Scott Muller	
1986	Running Scared	Detective Frank Sigliano	
1986	Sword of Gideon	Avner	TV movie
1987	Tales from the Hollywood Hills: A Table at Ciro's	Tony Montoya	TV movie
1988	Wildfire	Frank	
1988	The Beast of War	Khan Taj	
1989	Gleaming the Cube	Al Lucero	
1991	A Climate for Killing	Paul McGraw	
1991	Sweet Poison	Bobby	TV movie
1991	False Arrest	Detective Dan Ryan	TV movie
1992	Drive Like Lightning	Charlie	TV movie
1992	Raising Cain	Jack Dante	
1993	Snapdragon	Dr. David "Doc" Hoogstraten	
1994	Woman of Desire	Jonathan Ashby/Ted Ashby	
1994	Improper Conduct	Sam	
1994	Stranger by Night	Bobby Corcoran	Video
1994	Terminal Voyage	Reese	
1995	Codename: Silencer	Vinnie Rizzo	
1995	Wild Side	Tony	
1996	Primal Fear	Joey Pinero	
1996	Navajo Blues	Nick Epps/John Cole	
1997	Plato's Run	Sam	Video
1997	Sisters and Other Strangers	Anthony Quintana	TV movie
1997	The Blackout	Mickey's Studio Actor	
1997	Star Portal	Dr. Ray Brady	Video
1997	Miami	–	
1997	Kickboxing Academy	Carl	
1998	The Versace Murder	FBI Agent John Jacoby	
1998	Naked Lies	Kevin Dowd	
2000	Warm Texas Rain	Rush	Video
2000	Forever Lulu	Lou	
2000	Rave	Antonio	
2000	For Love or Country: The Arturo Sandoval Story	Angel	TV movie
2000	Traffic	Carlos Ayala	
2000	El Grito	Ibarra	
2000	Glory Glory	Jack	
2001	Boss of Bosses	Vito Genovese	TV movie
2001	The Learning Curve	Mark York	
2002	King of Texas	Menchaca	TV movie
2002	Malevolent	Captain Greg Pruitt	
2003	Masked and Anonymous	Edgar	
2003	Nola	Leo	
2004	Raptor Island	Azir	TV movie
2004	Doing Hard Time	Detective Anthony Wade	Video
2005	How the Garcia Girls Spent Their Summer	Victor Reyes	
2005	Keeper of the Past	The Mayor	Short
2005	Hitters Anonymous	Theodore 'Teddy' Swan	
2005	Pit Fighter	Manolo	
2005	The Lost City	Castel	
2005	La fiesta del Chivo	Juan Jose Viñas	
2006	Ladrones & Mentirosos	Oscar	
2006	Dead Lenny	Lenny Long	Video
2007	Kings of South Beach	Allie Boy	TV movie
2007	The Last Sentinel	Drone Scientist	
2007	Category 4	Robert	Short
2007	Planet Raptor	Captain Mace Carter	TV movie
2007	Natural Born Komics	–	Video
2008	Smother	Carl	Short
2008	Mutants	Marcus Santiago	
2008	I Didn't Know Who I Was	Mr. David Hernandez	Short
2008	Dark World	Rick	
2009	Behind Enemy Lines: Colombia	General Manuel Valez	Video
2009	Charlie Valentine	Ferucci	
2009	From Mexico with Love	Tito	
2009	Camouflage	Bobby	
2009	The Intruders	Michael Foster	
2010	Bulletface	Ned Walker	
2010	Fast Lane	Lt. Baynes	
2010	Toxic	Conrad	
2010	Shadows in Paradise	Agent Stubbs	
2010	A Numbers Game	Neal Black	
2010	Enemies Among Us	Senator Fred Edmonds	
2010	Zenitram	Frank Ramírez	
2010	Suicide Dolls	Hank	
2010	Raven	William	
2010	Disarmed	Col. Caine	
2010	Venus & Vegas	Francis	
2010	Promises	Detective Stevens	
2010	One in the Gun	Arthur	
2010	Crumble	Reda	Short
2010	Boyle Heights	Tino	
2011	The Last Gamble	Steven	
2011	Session	Jake Tellman	
2011	Joshua Tree	Jefferey	
2011	Mommy & Me	Brad Johnson	
2011	Pimp Bullies	Mr. Watson	
2011	Jackie Goldberg Private Dick	Mr. Lincoln	
2011	Driving by Braille	Rudolf Corso	
2012	Paloma	Enrique	Short
2012	Sins Expiation	Williams	
2012	ATypical Love	Brad Johnson	
2012	For the Love of Money	Hector	
2012	Garbage	Steven	
2012	A Dark Truth	Tony Green	
2012	Werewolf: The Beast Among Us	Hyde	Video
2012	Gothic Assassins	VOX	
2012	Success Driven	The Husband	Short
2012	Showstopper	Detective Vinnie Randall	
2012	Revan	Shadow	
2012	Knuckleheads	Manny	
2013	Day of Redemption	Jeffrey Cambell	
2013	Counterpunch	Tomas	
2013	Real Gangsters	Nick "Big Nick" Salens	
2013	Once Upon a Time in Queens	P.O. Ramirez	
2013	Five Thirteen	Ernesto Esteban	
2013	Chavez Cage of Glory	Brother Jose	
2013	Awakened	Lucas Drake	
2013	Seasick Sailor	Waldorf	Short
2014	The Lookalike	Frank	
2014	Killing Frisco	Esteban	
2015	Sweet Lorraine	Lou	
2016	Beyond the Game	Eric	
2016	Restored Me	Armando	
2016	J.L. Family Ranch	Hector Arrieta	
2016	Toyed	Mr. Martinez	Short
2016	King of LA	Adrian	TV movie
2017	Andover	Father Gregory	
2017	Culture of Fear	Vega	
2017	Avenge the Crows	Ronaldo	
2017	Blue Eyes	Russian	TV movie
2020	Deported	Male INS Agent	
2021	Flinch	Joseph Doyle	
2021	Women Is Losers	Don Juan	
2021	My Dead Dad	Uncle Tommy	
2021	Love on the Rock	Claudio Fairbanks	
2021	Mister Mayfair	Mike	
2021	Mister Mayfair 2 – A Song to Kill For	Mike	
2022	Nothing Is Impossible	Archie Touraine	
TBA	Barracuda	TBA	Post-production

=== Television ===
Year	Show	Role	Notes
1977–1979	¿Qué Pasa, U.S.A.?	Joe Peña	Main cast (seasons 1–3)
1978	The Rockford Files	Jesus Hernandez	Episode: "A Fast Count"
1980	From Here to Eternity	Pvt,. Ignacio Carmona	Episode: "Pearl Harbor"
1981	Hill Street Blues	Officer Fuentes	Recurring cast (season 1)
1981	One Day at a Time	Eduardo Diaz	Episode: "I Do, I Do"
1985	Alfred Hitchcock Presents	Gambler	Episode: "Pilot"
1990	Drug Wars: The Camarena Story	DEA Agent Enrique "Kiki" Camarena	Episode: "Part 1-3"
1990	Wiseguy	Michael Santana	Main cast (season 4)
1992	Red Shoe Diaries	Michael	Episode: "Safe Sex"
1998	The Outer Limits	Sergeant Waylon Dumar	Episode: "Nightmare"
1998	Welcome to Paradox	Detective Angel Cardenas	Episode: "Our Lady of the Machine"
1999	Walker, Texas Ranger	Lorenzo Cabral	Episode: "Rise to the Occasion"
2000	Relic Hunter	Tony	Episode: "Fertile Ground"
2001	Nash Bridges	Lima	Episode: "Out of Miami"
2001	V.I.P.	Blake Thompson	Episode: "Val Under Covers"
2001	UC: Undercover	Carlos Cortez	Recurring cast
2005	Sex, Love & Secrets	Stefano	Episode: "Territorial Defense"
2006	E! True Hollywood Story	Himself	Episode: "Scarface"
2006	South Beach	Lieutenant Rivera	Recurring cast
2007	Burn Notice	Reyes	Episode: "Hard Bargain"
2007	Law & Order: Special Victims Unit	Raphael Gardner	Episode: "Paternity"
2009	Cold Case	Osmany "Oz" Leon	Episode: "Stealing Home"
2009	American Dad!	Jaramillo (voice)	Episode: "Stan's Night Out"
2009	Mental	Diego Suarez	Episode: "Coda"
2010	Hacienda Heights	Mayor Eduardo Garcia	Main cast (season 2)
2011	Breaking Bad	Don Eladio Vuente	Recurring cast (season 4)
2012	Common Law	Miguel Avila	Episode: "In-Laws vs. Outlaws"
2013	The Mentalist	Don Clyde	Episode: "Little Red Corvette"
2013	CSI: Crime Scene Investigation	Bobby Esposito	Episode: "Passed Pawns"
2013–2017	Ray Donovan	Avi Rudin	Main cast (seasons 1–5)
2014	The Night Shift	Milo Osborne	Recurring cast (season 1)
2014	Hawaii Five-0	Jimmy Sykes	Episode: "Ho'oilina"
2015	Battle Creek	Roderigo	Episode: "Sympathy for the Devil"
2015–2017	Blue Bloods	Gerry Guerrero	Guest cast (seasons 6–7)
2017–2018	Queen of the South	Santos	Recurring cast (season 2), guest (season 3)
2017–2022	Better Call Saul	Don Eladio Vuente	Guest cast (season 3 & 5-6)
2018	Goliath	Willie	Episode: "Diablo Verde"
2019	Supergirl	Bernardo Rojas	Episode: "Confidence Women"
2021	NCIS	Miguel Torres	Episode: "Sangre"
2023	S.W.A.T.	Sancho Zamora	Episode: "Legacy"
2023	White House Plumbers	Dr. Manuel Artime	Episode: "True Believers"
2023	The Blacklist	Vicente Sandoval	Episode: "Wormwood (No. 182)"

=== Video games ===
Year	Game	Role
2006	Scarface: The World Is Yours	The Sandman
2012	Call of Duty: Black Ops II	Additional Voices
2012	Hitman: Absolution	Birdie
2016	Let It Die	Kommando Kawasaki

=== Music videos ===
Year	Artist	Song	Role
1984	Maria Conchita Alonso	"Noche de Copas"	Main Lover Interest
1985	Eurythmics	"Would I Lie to You?"	Biker Boyfriend
1985	The Pointer Sisters	"Dare Me"	Boxer
1985	Miami Sound Machine	"Conga"	Crowd Dancer
2007	Pitbull	"Secret Admirer"	Extra
2013	Drake	"Hold On, We're Going Home"	Kidnapper
2016	Kill My Coquette	"3rd & Bonnie Brae"	Himself
2018	Zayn	"Let Me"	Kingpin
2018	Zayn	"Entertainer"	Kingpin

== Accolades ==
Bauer has received recognition from major film, television, and industry organizations for his performances in both film and television ensembles.

=== Awards and nominations ===
Year	Association	Category	Nominated work	Result
1983	Golden Globe Awards	Best Supporting Actor – Motion Picture	Scarface	Nominated
2000	Screen Actors Guild Awards	Outstanding Performance by a Cast in a Motion Picture	Traffic	Won
2012	ALMA Awards	Favorite TV Reality, Variety, or Comedy Series	¿Qué Pasa, USA?	Nominated

== See also ==
- List of Cubans
- List of Cuban Americans
- Breaking Bad (franchise)
