= Shannon's Rainbow =

- Movie poster
- Directed by: Frank E. Johnson
- Written by: Linda Morris; John Mowod; Larry Richert
- Produced by: Joycelyn Engle; Joseph Di Palma; Frank E. Johnson
- Starring: Julianne Michelle; Claire Forlani; Louis Gossett Jr. Eric Roberts; Daryl Hannah; Michael Madsen; Jason Gedrick; Charles Durning; Steve Guttenberg
- Cinematography: Dean Cundey
- Edited by: Patrea Patrick; Jack Tucker
- Music by: Charles David Denler
- Production company: Supernova Media
- Distributed by: Supernova Media
- Release date: 2009
- Running time: 92 minutes
- Country: United States
- Language: English
- Budget: $8.5 million

Shannon's Rainbow (also listed as Amazing Racer) is a 2009 American independent family film directed by Frank E. Johnson. It stars Julianne Michelle and Claire Forlani.

The film stars Julianne Michelle as a grieving teenager who relocates to southwestern Pennsylvania to live with her estranged mother, finding therapeutic solace in caring for an injured harness racing horse.

The production was managed by the independent studio Supernova Media, which Michelle owned and operated alongside her parents, Joycelyn Engle (the studio's vice president and a producer) and Joseph Di Palma (who provided corporate backing). Shot on location in the Pittsburgh metropolitan area on an estimated production budget of $8.5 million, principal photography was completed in mid-2008.

The script was written by John Mowod and Larry Richert and based on Mowod's experience seeing his brother rehabilitate an injured horse and win a championship horse race. The movie bypassed a commercial theatrical release entirely, resulting in no box office earnings, and was released via home media and digital video on demand (VOD) in 2013.

== Plot ==
Following the sudden death of her father, 17-year-old Shannon (Julianne Michelle) learns that her father had kept her hidden from her mother Christine since birth. Shannon relocates from Florida to Pennsylvania to live with Christine. She gets involved in the lives of Christine's boyfriend Eric and his family. They have a stables that works in harness racing and have been bringing along a filly named Rainbow who takes very strongly to Shannon.

Eric and those around him are targets of a spiteful grudge held by the rich Mitchell Prescott who buys the filly for $15,000 in a claiming race. Mitchell runs Rainbow into the ground, having her beaten until nearly dead for the sin of having a mind of her own and visibly preferring Shannon, then sells her off to the knackers. Eric tracks down the horse en route to the location where Rainbow is due to be slaughtered and buys her back for $400. The filly is returned to Shannon's care and a trainer with a murky past (Max) is given the task to return her to health. They move Rainbow to a neighboring farm to train her to racing fitness while avoiding a spy at Parker stables. The culmination is at the Pennsylvania Cup harness race.

== Cast ==
- Julianne Michelle as Shannon Greene
- Claire Forlani as Christine Pearson
- Daryl Hannah as Dr. Rita Baker
- Michael Madsen as Dave Blair
- Eric Roberts as Mitchell Prescott
- Charles Durning as Floyd
- Steve Guttenberg as Ed
- Stephen Colletti as Brandon
- Jason Gedrick as Eric Parker
- Louis Gossett Jr. as Max
- Tom Atkins as Captain Martin
- Krista Allen as Jessica
- Lauren Potter as Kerry
- Carson Brown as Rio
- Scott Eastwood as Joey
- Joanna Pacula as Emily Blair

== Production ==
Principal photography began on June 23, 2008, with an estimated production budget of $8.5 million. The film was directed by Frank E. Johnson, and shot across the Pittsburgh metropolitan area.

=== Development ===
The movie's primary production studio and international distributor, Supernova Media, was wholly owned, operated, and controlled as its President by Michelle alongside her parents, Joycelyn Engle and Joseph A. Di Palma.

Her mother, Joycelyn Engle, was the company's vice president, and one of the film's main credited on-set producers. Her father, Joseph Di Palma, additionally provided corporate backing and financial management for the production.

== Release: home video ==
The film did not have a theatrical release, resulting in no box office earnings. It was officially re-titled Amazing Racer for its commercial rollout, and instead, the movie was released on DVD and digital VOD on January 8, 2013, a number of years after it was filmed.

== Reception ==
Because the film did not have a theatrical release and distributed directly to home video, it did not receive extensive coverage from major national news publications.

Common Sense Media graded the film two out of five stars. It said that the production was highly formulaic and predictable, and that the central dramatic weight threatened to become "mawkish and overblown."

== See also ==
- List of films about horses
- List of films about horse racing
- Awakened – A 2013 drama film also produced by Supernova Media starring Julianne Michelle and managed by her parents.
