= Sandi Schultz =

South African actress, presenter and fashion designer

- Born: 19 January 1964 (age 62); Johannesburg, South Africa
- Education: University of Cape Town
- Years active: 1986–present
- Spouses: John Savage (m. 1993; div. 2003): Laszlo Bene (200?–2020)
- Website: sandischultz.com

Sandra Schultz (born 19 January 1964) is a South African actress, presenter, and fashion designer. Her films include Door to Silence (1992), Assignment (2015), While You Weren't Looking (2015), and Call Me Thief (2016). On television, she is known for her roles in Binnelanders (2005–2015), Die Spreeus (2019), Trackers (2019), the Netflix series Blood & Water (2020–), and Diepe Waters (2022).

Schultz is also known for her theatre work, earning a Vita Award nomination. Her clothing line is called Sass Designs.

== Early and personal life ==
Schultz was born in Johannesburg and grew up in Cape Town. She attended Alexander Sinton Secondary School. She went on to graduate from the University of Cape Town in 1986.

Schultz moved to Topanga, California in 1991, where she lived for twelve years and was married to American actor John Savage from 1993 until their divorce in 2003. She returned to South Africa in 2005 and later married Laszlo Bene. Bene died in May 2020; the couple had been together for almost 16 years.

Schultz has opened up about having been raped when she was 28 and the health issues she experienced in the aftermath. She founded Slutwalk Johannesburg, and her chosen charity on Survivor was the Rape Crisis Cape Town Trust.

== Filmography ==
=== Film ===
Year	Title	Role	Notes
1987	StageFright	Dancer	
1988	It's Murphy's Fault	Nancy	
1990	The Last Samurai	Receptionist	
1990	The Sandgrass People	Franscina	
1990	Voice in the Dark	Sheena	
1991	Across Red Nights (Italian: Notti di paura)		
1991	Buck ai confini del cielo	Kay Stark	
1992	Primary Motive	Vendor	
1992	Door to Silence (Italian: Le porte del silenzio)	Woman	Direct-to-video
1993	Flynn	Girl	
1994	Killing Obsession	Annie Smith	
1996	Where Truth Lies	Dr Tobias	
1998	Centurion Force		
1999	Ghost Soldier		
2002	The Anarchist Cookbook	Moon Child	
2004	Downtown: A Street Tale	Jada	
2015	Mooirivier	Valeria	
2015	Assignment	Kathleen "Kat" Jacobs	
2015	While You Weren't Looking	Dez	
2016	Call Me Thief (Afrikaans: Noem My Skollie)	Kettie Lonzi	
2018	Number 37 (Afrikaans: Nommer 37)	Lieutenant Gail February	

=== Television ===
Year	Title	Role	Notes
1989	Odd Man In	Maggie Mkise	Television film
1989	Screen Two	Portuguese Woman	Episode: "A Private Life"
1993	Drumbeats	Virginia	Television film
1994	Honeytown	Rose Solomon	Main role
2000	NYPD Blue	Alice Kenyon	Episode: "Tea and Sympathy"
2000	City of Angels	Dr Gwen Pennington	5 episodes
2005–2015	Binnelanders	Dr Jennifer Adams	Recurring role
2009	Survivor South Africa: Santa Carolina	Herself – Contestant	
2012	Die Löwin	Liefie	Television film
2014–2015	Vallei van Sluiers	Mary Willemse	Recurring role (seasons 3–4)
2015	Einfach Rosa	Jamila	Miniseries; 1 episode
2016	Ashes to Ashes	Ms Booi	
2016–2017	Hotel	Maggie Conradie	15 episodes
2017	Empire of the Sharks	Sarah	Television film
2017	Scandal!	Arabella	1 episode
2018	Knapsekêrels	Dr Lynn Davids	
2019	Draadloos	Pastor Miriam Moses	Television film
2019	Die Spreeus	Rosa Scheffers	Main role
2019	Trackers	Janina Mentz	Main role
2020–present	Blood & Water	Nicole Daniels	Main role
2022	Diepe Waters	Zelda Joubert	Main role

== Stage ==
Year	Title	Role	Notes
1986	The Wizard of Oz	Dorothy Gale	Artscape Theatre Centre, Cape Town
1986	Diplomatic Baggage		Artscape Theatre / H.B. Thom Theatre, Cape Town
1987	In Conversation, Indaba, In Gesprek		Baxter Theatre, Cape Town
1987	Julia	Christine	Black Sun, Johannesburg
1988	A Midsummer Night's Dream	Hermia	Baxter Theatre, Cape Town / Market Theatre, Johannesburg
1990	Houd-den-Bek		State Theatre, Pretoria / National Arts Festival, Grahamstown
1992	The Rocky Horror Show	Magenta	Artscape Theatre / Baxter Theatre, Cape Town
2016	Six Characters in Search of an Author	Mother	Market Theatre, Johannesburg
2018	My Seuns	Ensemble	Aardklop, Potchefstroom

== Awards and nominations ==
Year	Award	Category	Work	Result	Ref.
1993	Vita Awards	Performer of the Year – Musical	The Rocky Horror Show	Nominated	
