= Karel Schoeman =

South African writer

- Born: 26 October 1939; Trompsburg, South Africa
- Died: 1 May 2017 (aged 77); Bloemfontein, South Africa
- Education: University of the Free State
- Occupations: Novelist, Historian
- Writing career
- Language: Afrikaans, English, Dutch
- Genres: Prose Fiction, Biography, History

Karel Schoeman (Afrikaans pronunciation: [ˈkɑːrəl ˈskuman], 26 October 1939 – 1 May 2017) was a South African novelist, historian, translator and man of letters. Author of twenty novels and numerous works of history, he was one of South Africa's most honoured writers. Schoeman wrote primarily in Afrikaans, although several of his non-fiction books were originally written in English. His novels are increasingly being translated into other languages, notably, English, French and Dutch.

== Life and career ==
Born in 1939 in Trompsburg, South Africa, Karel Schoeman matriculated in 1956 from Paarl Boys' High School. In 1959, he obtained a BA degree in languages from the University of the Free State. In 1961, he joined the Franciscan Order in Ireland as a novice for the priesthood, but then returned to Bloemfontein to obtain a Higher Diploma in Library Studies. During the 1970s, he went into voluntary exile, working first as a librarian in Amsterdam and then as a nurse in Glasgow, Scotland. He returned to South Africa in 1977 and worked until his retirement in 1998 as an archivist at the South African National Library in Cape Town. He then relocated to his town of birth, Trompsburg, where he lived for more than a decade before moving to Bloemfontein. In September 2008, he moved to the Noorderbloem retirement community, where he died on 1 May 2017.

Schoeman is known not only as a novelist, but is equally renowned as an historian and biographer. He has also published translations (especially of drama), several travel books and an autobiography. He won the most prestigious Afrikaans literary award, the Hertzog Prize, three times: in 1971 (for By Fakkellig, ’n Lug vol helder wolke and Spiraal), 1986 (’n Ander land) and in 1995 (Hierdie lewe). The Recht Malan Prize for "excellence in the field of non-fiction books" was awarded to him four times. On the retirement of President Nelson Mandela in 1999, Schoeman was one of only two writers to be awarded the State President Award: Order for Excellent Service. In more recent years, his fiction garnered much praise in France, winning inter alia the prestigious Prix du Meilleur Livre Étranger in 2009. In the last years of his life, it was rumored that he was a possible candidate for the Nobel Prize in Literature.

His 1972 novel, Na die Geliefde Land (literally: To the Beloved Country), was made into an award-winning feature film, Promised Land in 2002, with a screenplay by Jason Xenopoulos. Schoeman produced and published several screenplays, including an adaptation of his first novel, Veldslag, some of which were broadcast on South African national television during the 1980s.

Schoeman committed suicide at a retirement center in Bloemfontein, at the age of 77, writing about dying with dignity in his suicide statement. A previous attempt failed when he was 75. He wrote openly about his reasons and plans for ending his life in Slot van die Dag (translated as At Close of Day), which was published shortly after his death.

== Major works ==
=== Novels ===
- Veldslag (1965) (consisting of two novellas: Veldslag and In Ballingskap)
- By Fakkellig (1966)
- ’n Lug vol Helder Wolke (1967)
- Spiraal (1968)
- Op ’n Eiland (1971)
- Na die Geliefde Land (1972)
- Die Noorderlig (1975)
- Om te Sterwe (1976)
- Afrika: 'n Roman (1977)
- Die Hemeltuin (1979)
- Die Reisiger (1980)
- Waar Ek Gelukkig Was (1981)
- ’n Ander Land (1984)
- Afskeid en Vertrek (1990)
- Hierdie Lewe (1993)
- Die Uur van die Engel (1995)
- Verkenning (1996)
- Verliesfontein (1998)
- Titaan: ’n Roman oor die Lewe van Michelangelo Buonarroti (2009)
- Skepelinge: Aanloop tot ’n Roman (2017)

=== Screenplays ===
- Besoek: 'n Teks vir Beeldradio (1975)
- Die Somerpaleis: 'n Teks vir Beeldradio (1975)
- Die Jare: 'n Teks vir Beeldradio (1976)
- Op die Grens (broadcast on SA television, 1988, unpublished)
- Veldslag: 'n Draaiboek (1989)
- Die Vrou wat Alleen Bly: Twee Draaiboeke (2014), consisting of two screenplays: 'n Vrou wat Alleen Bly and Hiér Was Huise, Hiér 'n Pad

=== Autobiographical works, travel writing and belles lettres ===
- Berig uit die Vreemde: ’n Ierse Dagboek (1966)
- Van ’n Verre Eiland: ’n Tweede Ierse Dagboek (1968)
- Koninkryk in die Noorde: 'n Boek oor Skotland (1977)
- Onderweg: Reisherinnerings (1978)
- Stamland: 'n Reis deur Nederland (1999)
- Die Laaste Afrikaanse Boek: Outobiografiese Aantekeninge (2002)
- Riviereland: Twee Besoeke aan Nederland (2011)
- Deelstad: ’n Boek oor Berlyn (2013)
- Afskeid van Europa: Aantekeninge (2017)
- Slot van die Dag: Gedagtes (2017)
- Die Laaste Reis (2018)

=== Translations into Afrikaans by Schoeman ===
- Anton Chekhov, Oom Wanja: Tonele uit die Plattelandse Lewe in Vier Bedrywe (1968)
- Uit die Iers: Middeleeuse Gedigte (1970)
- Helde van die Rooi Tak: Die Saga van Cucullin en die Veeroof van Culne (1973)
- Friedrich Schiller, Maria Stuart (1973)
- Anton Chekhov, Die Kersieboord: Blyspel in Vier Bedrywe (1975)
- Gode, Helde en Konings: Middeleeuse Ierse Verhale (1975)
- Finn en sy Mense: Die Avonture van die Fianna van Ierland (1976)
- Pieter Langendijk, Die Huweliksbedrog: 'n Blyspel (1976)
- Herman Heijermans, Op Hoop van Seën: 'n Spel van die See in Vier Bedrywe (1979)
- Arthur Schnitzler, Liebelei (1981)
- Rob Nairn, ’n Stil Gemoed: 'n Inleiding tot die Boeddhisme en Meditasie (1997)

=== Translations into foreign languages ===
==== English ====
- Promised Land (Na die Geliefde Land), tr. Marian V. Friedman (1978)
- Another Country (’n Ander Land) tr. David Schalkwyk (1991)
- Olive Schreiner: A Woman in South Africa (Olive Schreiner: ’n Lewe in Suid-Afrika, 1855-1881), tr. H. Snijders (1991)
- Take Leave and Go (Afskeid en Vertrek) tr. the author (1992)
- An excerpt from Verliesfontein in Chris N. van der Merwe & Michael Rice (eds), A Century of Anglo-Boer War Stories (1999)
- This Life (Hierdie Lewe), tr. Elsa Silke (2005, re-issued in New York, 2015)
- At Close of Day: Reflections (Slot van die Dag) tr. Elsa Silke (2018)

==== French ====
- En Étrange Pays (’n Ander land) tr. Jean Guiloineau (1993, re-issued 2007)
- Three short stories in Caravanes tr. Pierre-Marie Finkelstein (2003)
- La Saison des Adieux (Afskeid en Vertrek) tr. Pierre-Marie Finkelstein (2004), Prix Amphi (2006)
- Retour au Pays Bien-Aimé (Na die Geliefde Land) tr. Pierre-Marie Finkelstein (2006)
- Cette Vie (Hierdie Lewe) tr. Pierre-Marie Finkelstein (2009), Prix du Meilleur Livre Étranger (2009)
- Des Voix Parmi les Ombres (Verliesfontein) tr. Pierre-Marie Finkelstein (2014)
- L'Heure de l'Ange (Die Uur van die Engel) tr. Pierre-Marie Finkelstein (2018), Prix Transfuge du Meilleur roman africain (2018)
- Le jardin céleste (Die Hemeltuin) tr. Pierre-Marie Finkelstein (2022)

==== Dutch ====
- Een Ander Land (’n Ander Land) tr. Riet de Jong-Goossens (1992, re-issued 2017)
- Two excerpts from Verliesfontein in Ena Jansen & Wilfred Jonckheere (eds), Boer en Brit: Ooggetuigen en Schrijvers over de Anglo-Boerenoorlog in Zuid-Afrika (2001)
- Merksteen: Een Dubbelbiografie (Merksteen: ’n Dubbelbiografie) tr. Riet de Jong-Goossens (2004)
- Dit Leven (Hierdie Lewe) tr. Rob van der Veer (2014)
- Het Uur van de Engel (Die Uur van die Engel) tr. Rob van der Veer (2015)
- Verliesfontein (Verliesfontein) tr. Rob van der Veer (2016)
- De Hemeltuin (Die Hemeltuin) tr. Rob van der Veer (2019)

==== German ====
- In Einem Fremden Land (Na die Geliefde Land) tr. Gisela Stege (1993)

==== Russian ====
- V rodnuju stranu (В родную страну) (Na die Geliefde Land) tr. A.K. Slavinska (1978)

=== Historical works ===
==== Monographs ====
- Bloemfontein: Die Ontstaan van 'n Stad, 1846–1946 (1980)
- Vrystaatse Erfenis: Bouwerk en Geboue in die 19de Eeu (1982)
- Die Dood van 'n Engelsman: Die Cox-Moorde van 1856 en die Vroeë Jare van die Oranje-Vrystaat (1982)
- Boukkunsskatte van die Vrystaat / Free State Heritage (1985)
- Die Wêreld van die Digter: ’n Boek oor Sutherland en die Roggeveld ter ere van N.P. van Wyk Louw (1986)
- Die Moord op Hesje van der Merwe, 19 Oktober 1837 (1995)
- J.J. Kicherer en die Vroeë Sending, 1799–1806 (1996)
- Armosyn van die Kaap: Voorspel tot Vestiging, 1415–1651 (1999)
- Armosyn van die Kaap: Die Wêreld van 'n Slavin, 1652–1733 (2001)
- The Griqua Captaincy of Philippolis, 1826–1861 (2002)
- The Early Mission in South Africa / Die Vroeë Sending in Suid-Afrika, 1799–1819 (2005)
- Kinders van die Kompanjie: Kaapse Lewens uit die Sewentiende Eeu (2006)
- Early Slavery at the Cape of Good Hope, 1652–1717 (2007)
- Patrisiërs en Prinse: Die Europese Samelewing en die Stigting van 'n Kolonie aan die Kaap, 1619–1715 (2008)
- Seven Khoi Lives: Cape Biographies of the Seventeenth Century (2009)
- Handelsryk in die Ooste: Die Wêreld van die VOC, 1619–1688 (2009)
- Kolonie aan die Kaap: Jan van Riebeeck en die Vestiging van die Eerste Blankes, 1652–1662 (2010)
- Burgers en Amptenare: Die Vroeë Ontwikkeling van die Kolonie aan die Kaap, 1662–1679 (2011)
- Cape Lives of the Eighteenth Century (2011)
- Here en Boere: Die Kolonie aan die Kaap onder die Van der Stels, 1679–1712 (2013)
- Portrait of a Slave Society: The Cape of Good Hope, 1717–1795 (2013)
- Hoogty: Die Opbloei van 'n Koloniale Kultuur aan die Kaap, 1751-1779 (2014)
- Imperiale Somer: Suid-Afrika tussen Oorlog en Unie, 1902-1910 (2015)
- Swanesang: Die Einde van die Kompanjiestyd aan die Kaap, 1771-1795 (2016)

==== Biographies ====
- In Liefde en Trou: Die Lewe van President Martinus Theunis Steyn en mevrou Tibbie Steyn met 'n Keuse uit Hulle Korrespondensie (1983)
- Olive Schreiner: 'n Lewe in Suid-Afrika, 1855–1881 (1989)
- Only an Anguish to Live Here: Olive Schreiner and the Anglo-Boer War, 1899–1902 (1992)
- Irma Stern: The Early Years, 1894–1933 (1994)
- Die Kort Sendingloopbaan van Sophia Burgmann, 1805–1812 (1994)
- A Thorn Bush that Grows in the Path: The Missionary Career of Ann Hamilton, 1815–1823 (1995)
- Die Wêreld van Susanna Smit, 1799–1863 (1995)
- A Debt of Gratitude: Lucy Lloyd and the 'Bushman Work' of G.W. Stow (1997)
- Dogter van Sion: Machtelt Smit en die 18de-eeuse Samelewing aan die Kaap, 1749–1799 (1997)
- Merksteen: 'n Dubbelbiografie (1998)
- ’n Duitser aan die Kaap, 1724–1765: Die Lewe en Loopbaan van Hendrik Schoeman (2004)
- Twee Kaapse Lewens: Henricus en Aletta Beck en die Samelewing van Hul Tyd, 1702–1755 (2013)
- Die hart van die son:`n Roman oor die Lewe van Shakespeare (1965)

==== Edited works ====
- Bloemfontein in Beeld / Portrait of Bloemfontein, 1860–1881 (1987)
- Griqua Records: The Philippolis Captaincy, 1825–1861 (1996)
- The Face of the Country: A South African Family Album, 1860–1910 (1996)
- The Mission at Griquatown, 1801–1821 (1997)
- Witnesses to War: Personal Documents of the Anglo-Boer War (1899–1902) from the Collections of the South African Library (1998)
- Die Suidhoek van Afrika: Geskrifte oor Suid-Afrika uit die Nederlandse Tyd, 1652–1806 (2002)
- Die Bosmans van Drakenstein: Persoonlike Dokumente van die Familie Bosman van Drakenstein, 1705–1842 (2010)

== Awards and honours ==
- 1970 Hertzog Prize for By Fakkellig, ’n Lug Vol Helder Wolke & Spiraal
- 1972 CNA Prize for Na die Geliefde Land
- 1983 Recht Malan Prize (for non-fiction) for Vrystaatse Erfenis
- 1984 Old Mutual Prize for ’n Ander Land
- 1985 W.A. Hofmeyr Prize for ’n Ander Land
- 1986 Hertzog Prize for ’n Ander Land
- 1988 Helgaard Steyn Prize for ’n Ander Land
- 1990 SABC Prize for Best Television Drama for Op die Grens
- 1991 Old Mutual Prize for Afskeid en Vertrek
- 1994 CNA Prize for Hierdie Lewe
- 1995 Hertzog Prize for Hierdie Lewe
- 1997 M-Net Book Award for Verkenning
- 1997 Stals Prize for Cultural History from the South African Academy for Arts & Science
- 1998 Recht Malan Prize (for non-fiction) for Dogter van Sion
- 1999 State President Award: Order for Excellent Service
- 2000 D.Litt (honoris causa), University of Cape Town
- 2002 Recht Malan Prize (for non-fiction) for Armosyn van die Kaap
- 2003 Recht Malan Prize (for non-fiction) for Die Laaste Afrikaanse Boek
- 2003 Order for Meritorious Service in silver
- 2004 D.Litt (honoris causa), University of the Free State
- 2006 Prix Amphi for La Saison des Adieux (Afskeid en Vertrek)
- 2006 Lifetime Achievement by the South African Literature Awards for his complete oeuvre
- 2009 Prix du Meilleur Livre Étranger for Cette Vie (Hierdie Lewe)
- 2014 Shortlisted: Alan Paton Award for Portrait of a Slave Society
- 2014 Shortlisted: kykNET-Rapport Book Prize (for non-fiction) for Here en Boere: Die Kolonie aan die Kaap onder die Van der Stels, 1679–1712
