= John Savage (actor) =

American actor (born 1949)

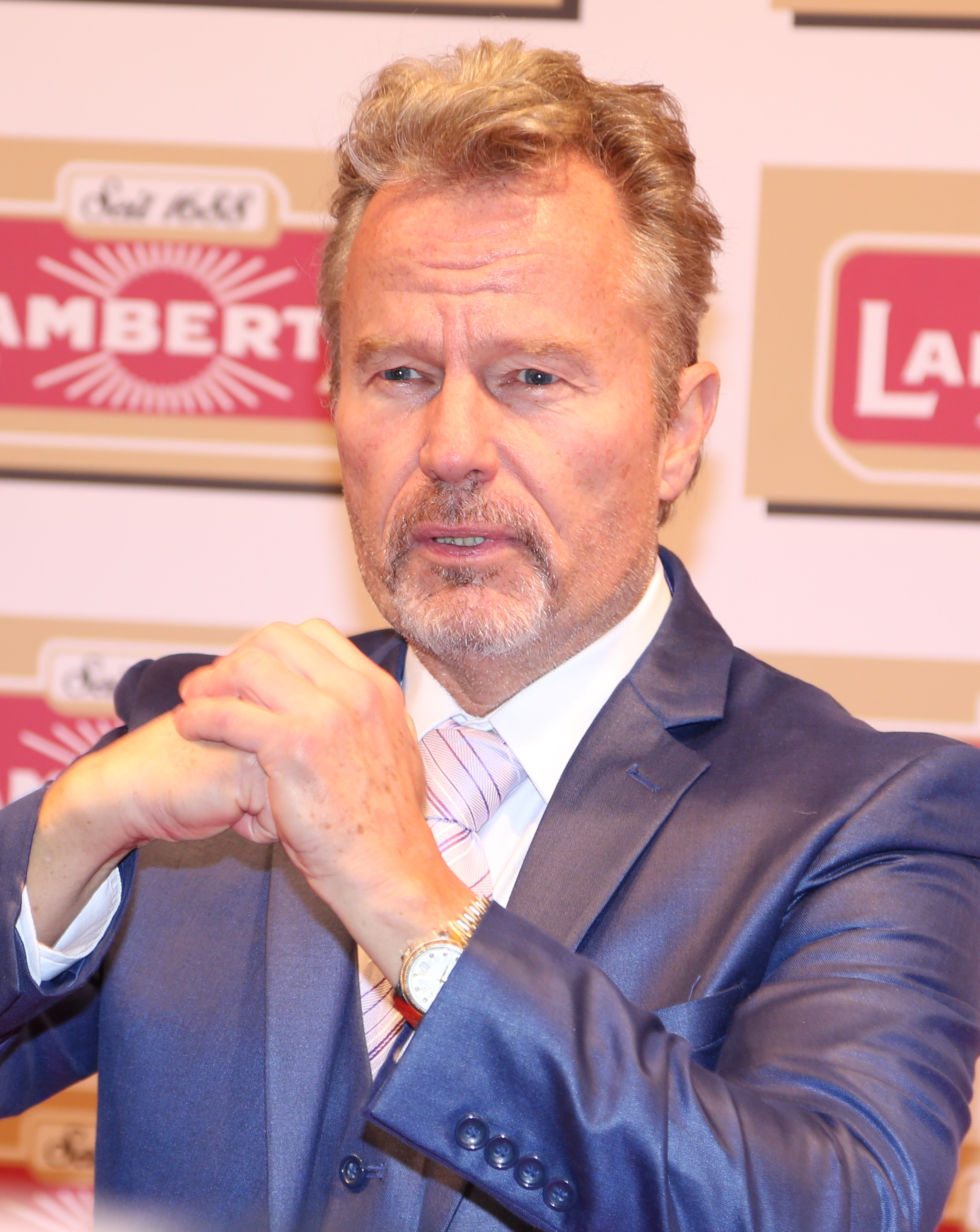
- Savage in 2017
- Born: John Smeallie Youngs; August 25, 1949 (age 77); Old Bethpage, New York, U.S.
- Education: American Academy of Dramatic Arts
- Occupation: Actor
- Years active: 1969–present
- Spouses: Susan Youngs (m. 1967; div. 1969); Sandi Schultz (m. 1993; div. 2002)
- Relatives: Jim Youngs (brother); Robin Young (sister); Robert Duvall (ex-brother-in-law)

John Smeallie Youngs (born August 25, 1949), known professionally as John Savage, is an American actor. He first rose to prominence in the late 1970s for his portrayals of troubled-but-sensitive characters in films like The Deer Hunter (1978), The Onion Field (1979) and Hair (1979). His television roles include Donald Lydecker on Dark Angel (2000–02) and Hack Scudder on Carnivàle (2003–05).

== Early life ==
John Smeallie Youngs was born in Old Bethpage on Long Island, New York on August 25, 1949, to Muriel Vanderveer (née Smeallie) and Floyd-Jones Youngs Jr. Savage's younger siblings, Gail (b. 1952) and Jim Youngs (b. 1956), are also actors. His younger sister, Robin Young, is a Peabody Award-winning journalist and news broadcaster.

After graduating from the American Academy of Dramatic Arts, Savage worked for the Manhattan's Children's Theatre Group.

== Career ==
Savage has appeared in more than 200 feature films, short films, recurring roles in television series and guest appearances in episodes of television series. One of Savage's first notable roles is as Claude Hooper Bukowski in the 1979 film Hair. His first major film role was as Steven Pushkov in the multiple Oscar-winning 1978 war drama film The Deer Hunter. He also had a lead role in the 1979 film The Onion Field. Savage received widespread critical acclaim for his early cinematic performances in the three films.

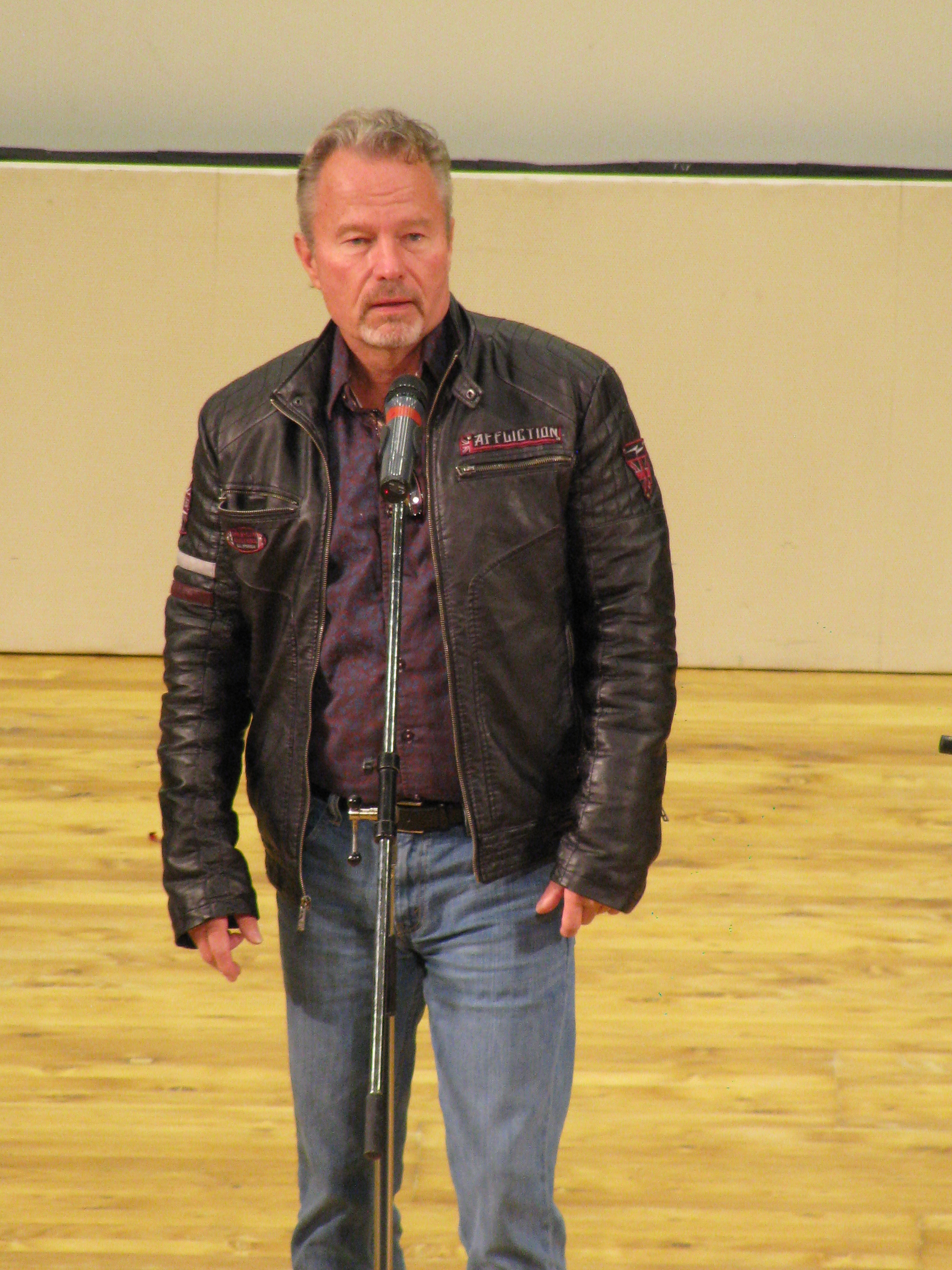
Savage discussing Hair at Sofia International Film Festival, March 2017

In the late 1970s, he performed in the Broadway production of David Mamet's play American Buffalo.

In 1991, he starred in Italian director Lucio Fulci's final film Door to Silence. He then had a brief role in the 1998 war film The Thin Red Line, portrayed Captain Ransom in the two part episode "Equinox" of the television series Star Trek: Voyager in 1999, and appeared in the recurring role of Donald Lydecker in the first and second seasons of the 2000 television series Dark Angel.

Savage appeared in the recurring role of Henry Scudder in the HBO television series Carnivàle between 2003 and 2005. He appeared in unrelated roles in two of the series in the Law & Order franchise: the 2004 Law & Order: Criminal Intent episode "Conscience" as a man who put his wife in a permanent coma, and the 2005 Law & Order: Special Victims Unit episode "Quarry" as a child molester on death row for murdering one of his victims.

In 2014, Savage appeared in the thriller Awakened. His performance was heavily criticized by mainstream film critics, with New York Times critic Jeannette Catsoulis calling his character dynamics awkward and forced. He received positive critical feedback for his supporting performance in the military drama Fort Bliss (2014). Savage appeared in the 2015 horror film Tales of Halloween, the 2017 drama film In Dubious Battle, and on the 2017 continuation of the horror drama television show Twin Peaks.

In 2017, Savage spoke at a tribute honoring director Richard Donner, held by The Academy of Motion Picture Arts and Sciences.

In 2018, he appeared on the legal drama television show Goliath. In the same year, Savage lent his voice to a monologue on the title track of the album This Town by Steve Smith of Dirty Vegas.

== Personal life ==
Savage has two children with his first wife, Susan (divorced 1969), including actress Jennifer Youngs (b. 1969). He was married to South African actress Sandi Schultz between 1993 and 2002.

During the 1980s and 1990s, Savage was an anti-apartheid activist in South Africa, and became acquainted with Nelson Mandela. He helped secure Mandela's involvement in the 1992 film Malcolm X, directed by Spike Lee, on which he was the assistant production manager for the South Africa unit.

Savage's former brother-in-law was actor Robert Duvall, who was married to his sister Gail Youngs, from 1982 to 1986.

== Filmography ==
=== Film ===
Year	Title	Role	Notes
1969	The Master Beater	Rocco	
1971	Love is a Carousel	Boy Friend	
1972	Bad Company	Loney	
1973	Steelyard Blues	Kid	
1973	The Killing Kind	Terry Lambert	
1974	The Sister in Law	Robert Strong	
1978	The Deer Hunter	Corporal Steven Pushkov	
1979	Hair	Claude Hooper Bukowski	
1979	The Onion Field	Det. Karl Francis Hettinger	
1980	Inside Moves	Roary	
1981	Cattle Annie and Little Britches	Bittercreek Newcomb	
1981	The Amateur	Charles Heller	
1983	Brady's Escape	J.W. Brady	
1984	Maria's Lovers	Ivan Bibic	
1986	Vengeance of a Soldier	Frank Morgan	
1986	Salvador	John Cassady	
1986	The Little Sister	Tim Donovan	
1987	Hotel Colonial	Marco Venieri	
1987	Beauty and the Beast	Beast / Prince	
1987	Caribe	Jeff Richardson	
1988	The Beat	Frank Ellsworth	
1989	Point of View	Amnon Yehoshua	
1989	Do the Right Thing	Clifton	
1990	Any Man's Death	Leon Abrahams	
1990	Voice in the Dark	Dan Montgomery	
1990	The Godfather Part III	Father Andrew Hagen	
1990	Ottobre rosa all'Arbat	Boris	
1991	Dark Tale	Roy Kramer	
1991	Hunting	Michael Bergman	
1991	Mountain of Diamonds	Blaine	
1991	Buck ai confini del cielo	Wintrop	
1991	Notti di paura	Paola	
1992	Door to Silence	Melvin Dovereux	
1992	Primary Motive	Wallace Roberts	
1993	Berlin '39	Wieland	
1993	CIA II: Target Alexa	Frank Kluge	
1994	Killing Obsession	Albert	
1994	Red Scorpion 2	Andrew Kendrick	
1994	Deadly Weapon	Sanders	
1995	The Dangerous	Emile Lautrec	
1995	Carnosaur 2	Jack Reed	
1995	The Crossing Guard	Bobby	
1995	The Takeover	Greg	
1995	Fatal Choice	Drury	
1995	White Squall	McCrea	
1995	One Good Turn	Santapietro	
1995	Where Truth Lies	Dr. Ian Lazarre	
1995	American Strays	Dwayne	
1995	Flynn	Joe Stromberg	
1995	Firestorm	Brinkman	
1997	The Mouse	Bruce Strauss	
1997	Little Boy Blue	Ray West	
1997	Amnesia	Tim Bishop	
1997	Hollywood Safari	Deputy Rogers	
1997	Hostile Intent	Bear	
1997	Et hjørne af Paradis	Padre Louis	
1997	Managua	Dennis	
1997	Ultimo taglio	Leo Kimball	
1998	Club Vampire	Zero	
1998	The Thin Red Line	Sgt. Jack McCron	
1999	Frontline	Captain Wolfgang Mueller	
1999	Message in a Bottle	Johnny Land	
1999	Summer of Sam	Simon	
2000	Christina's House	James Tarling	
2000	They Nest	Jack Wald	
2001	Dead Man's Run	Carver	
2001	Burning Down the House	Jake Seiling	
2002	Redemption of the Ghost	Sheriff Rollie Burns	
2002	The Anarchist Cookbook	Johnny Red	
2003	Intoxicating	William Shanley	
2003	Easy Sex	Frank Iverson	
2004	Fallacy	Heathcliff	
2004	Admissions	Harry Brighton	
2004	Downtown: A Street Tale	H2O	
2005	Iowa	Irv Huffman	
2005	Confessions of a Pit Fighter	McGee	
2005	The New World	Thomas Savage	
2006	Kill Your Darlings	Rock	
2006	The Drop	Mr. Zero	
2006	Shut Up and Shoot!	Marty Pearlheimer	
2007	Shortcut to Happiness	Johnny	Uncredited
2007	The Attic	Graham Callan	
2008	The Grift	William Bender	
2008	From a Place of Darkness	Vic	
2008	Boiler Maker	JJ	
2008	The Coverup	Thomas Thacker	
2008	The Golden Boys	Web Saunders	
2008	The Violent Kind	George Malloy	
2009	Anytown	News Producer	
2009	Wild About Harry	Horace White	
2009	Handsome Harry	Peter Rheems	
2009	Qi chuan xu xu	Frank Dreibelbis	
2009	Buffalo Bushido	Vendetti	
2009	Remembering Nigel	Himself	
2009	The Red Canvas	Harbin Rask	
2010	Dreamkiller	Agent Barnes	
2010	Bereavement	Ted	
2010	A Small Town Called Descent	Father Scully	
2010	Bed & Breakfast	Mr. Harvey	
2011	Colombian Interviews	James	
2011	The Last Gamble	John	
2011	Nichirin no isan	Douglas MacArthur	
2011	The Orphan Killer	Detective Walker	
2011	Hit List	Walter Murphy	
2011	Assassins' Code	Arlo	
2012	The Jonas Project	Calvin Kabral	
2012	The Black Dove	Jake Williams	
2012	Sins Expiation	Father Karl	
2012	Money Fight	Harbin Rask	
2012	Open Road	Carl	
2013	Real Gangsters	Ted Roberts	
2013	Gemini Rising	Manning	
2013	Awakened	Jack Winston	
2013	A Star for Rose	Mort	
2013	7E	Paul	
2013	Discarded	Jay	
2014	Bullet	Governor Johnson	
2014	Fort Bliss	Mike Swann	
2014	See How They Run	The Codger	
2014	The Lookalike	William Spinks	
2014	Cry of the Butterfly	William Berman	
2014	The Big Fat Stone	Robert Tanninger	
2015	The Sparrows: Nesting	Marvin	
2015	We Will Be the World Champions	William Jones	
2015	Tales of Halloween	Capt. J.G. Zimmerman	Segment "Bad Seed"
2015	Beverly Hills Christmas	Mr. Winters	
2016	Last Call at Murray's	Bennett	
2016	Texas Heart	Carl	
2016	In Dubious Battle	Dan	
2016	American Romance	Emery Reed	
2016	Dead South	Stokes	
2017	Nephilim	Father Samuel (voice)	
2017	The Return	Covek u crnom odelu	
2017	The Neighborhood	Vito Bello	
2017	Spreading Darkness	Brett	
2017	Fake News	President Wayne Walker	
2017	Going Vertical	Henry "Hank" Iba	
2018	Betrayed	Mayor Alderman	
2018	Easy Way Out	Martin	
2018	Followed	Wallace Fleischer	
2019	Sensory Perception	President of United Earth	
2019	Gates of Darkness	Joseph	
2019	Hold On	Dr. Siedhoff	
2019	The Islands	Henry Thornton	
2019	The Last Full Measure	Kepper	
2019	Down's Revenge	Dr. Sorkin	
2019	Heavenly Deposit	Donald	
2019	Spinning Dry	Frank Manghetti	
2020	A Medicine for the Mind	Dr. Ernest Brown	Short film
2021	Torch	August Lewin	
2021	Lockdown	The Narrator	
2021	Insight	Frank	
2021	The Dog of Christmas	Ron	
2022	The Right to Bear Arms	Brutal Magnus	
2023	Showdown at the Grand	Lucky	

=== Television ===
Year	Title	Role	Notes
1974	All the Kind Strangers	Peter	Television film
1975	Gibbsville	Jim Malloy	Television film
1975	Eric	Eric Swensen	Television film
1982	Coming Out of the Ice	Victor Herman	Television film
1984	Nairobi Affair	Rick Cahill	Television film
1985	Silent Witness	Kevin Dunne	Television film
1993	Daybreak	President	Television film
1994	Tales from the Crypt	Benny	Season 6 Episode 5 "Revenge is the Nuts"
1995	Tom Clancy's Op Center	Bob Herbert	Television film
1995	The X-Files	Henry Trondheim	Season 2 Episode 19 "Død Kalm"
1995	The Outer Limits	Lucas	Season 1 Episode 12 "The Conversion"
1996	Walker, Texas Ranger	Sergeant Major Bart Hawkins	Season 4 Episode 2 "Patriot"
1997	Before Women Had Wings	Billy Jackson	Television film
1998	Lost Souls	Victor Robinson	Television film
1999	The Jack Bull	Slater	Television film
1999	Star Trek: Voyager	Captain Rudy Ransom	Two-part episode "Equinox"
2000	The Virginian	Steve	Television film
2000	Dark Angel	Donald Lydecker	Main cast season 1, recurring season 2
2003	Carnivàle	Henry "Hack" Scudder	Recurring role
2004	Law and Order: Criminal Intent	Mark Farrell	
2004	Alien Lockdown	Dr. Alan Woodman	Television Film
2004	Sucker Free City	Anderson Wade	Television Film
2005	Love's Long Journey	Trent	Television Film
2009	Fringe	Andre Hughes	Season 2 Episode 2 "Night of Desirable Objects"
2013	Defending Santa	Judge Willis	Television Film
2013	Cleaners	Marcus Walker	Recurring season 2
2014	Bermuda Tentacles	President DeSteno	Television Film
2017	Teen Star Academy	Burt	Television Film
2017	Twin Peaks	Detective Clark	
2017	Empire of the Sharks	Ian Fein	Television Film
2018	40 and Single	Stewart Temple	
2018	Mission Possible	Captain Ted Napoleon	Television Film
2018	Goliath	Mickey	Recurring season 2
2018	Torque	Agent Curtis	
2018	6 Children & 1 Grandfather	David McDoll	Television Film
2019	Ovid and the Art of Love	Augustus	Television Film

== Awards ==
Throughout his career, Savage received numerous award nominations and wins across film festivals and ceremonies with recognition for best performance, best supporting actor, and genre-specific achievements.

- Special Achievement Award for Outstanding Motion Picture Ensemble in The Thin Red Line, shared among cast members (1999)
- Bronze Wrangler for The Virginian, shared among cast members (2001)
- AOF/WAB Award for Best Supporting Actor – Feature in Money Fight (2008)
- Claw Award for Best Supporting Actor in From a Place of Darkness (2009)
- Houston Film Society – Critics' Choice Award for Best Actor for The Black Dove (2012)
- Festival Award for Best Ensemble Cast in Last Call at Murray's, shared among cast members (2016)
- Sofia Award for outstanding achievements in world cinema (2017)
- IIFC Award for Best Ensemble in Last Call at Murray's, shared among cast members (2017)
- July Award for Best Actor in Betrayed (2018)
- Leading Actor – Best Lead Actor in Betrayed (2018)
