= Roberto Leoni =

Italian screenwriter and film director (1940–2024)

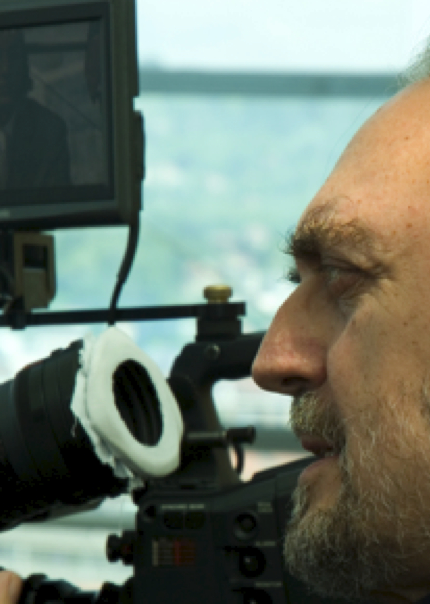
- Born: 16 November 1940; Rome, Italy
- Died: 5 March 2024 (aged 83); Rome, Italy
- Occupation(s): Screenwriter, film director

Roberto Leoni (16 November 1940 – 5 March 2024) was an Italian screenwriter and film director best known for such films as Santa Sangre (on Empire's 500 Greatest Movies Of All Time); The Master Touch; Street People; Casablanca Express; California; and My Dear Killer.

== Life and career ==
Roberto Leoni was born in Rome and studied classics. While still a student at Sapienza University in Rome, he was awarded a grant by the C.U.T. (University Theatrical Center) and his collections of poems and short stories were published. An important producer made one of his short stories into a film, Eat It. His collection of poems won the Culture Award from the Italian Presidency of Ministries.

After serving as first AD for directors like Tonino Valerii and Luciano Salce, Leoni wrote and directed a number of feature and short films including: The Guardians, Es Knallt - und die Engel singen, Film Monaco, Dark Tale, On the Right Side, and The Great Artists (18X35') series. From August 2017, he reviewed new and classic movies in his talk show, Roberto Leoni Movie Reviews. His last feature film was De Serpentis Munere - The Serpent's Gift.

== Death ==
Leoni died on 5 March 2024, in Rome, at the age of 83.

== Filmography ==
=== Film ===
- 2021 – De Serpentis Munere (The Serpent's Gift) (as writer and director)
- 2021 – Heartstruck (as writer and director)
- 2019 – Memory Island (as writer and director)
- 2016 – A Heart in the Drawer (as writer and director) under the auspices of Amnesty International Italy)
- 2014 – The Gypsy Angel (as writer and director)
- 2012 – Miss Wolf and the Lamb (as writer and director)
- 2009 – Terminal (as writer and director)
- 2007 – Anita - Una vita per Garibaldi (as writer)
- 2005 – On the Right Side (as writer and director)
- 2005 – Raul (as writer)
- 2000 – Si fa presto a dire amore (as writer)
- 2000 – L'uomo della fortuna (as writer)
- 1998 – Frigidaire, il film (as writer)
- 1995 – Nefertiti (as writer)
- 1993 – 18.000 giorni fa (as writer)
- 1991 – Dark Tale (as writer and director)
- 1990 – American Rickshaw (as writer)
- 1989 – Casablanca Express (as writer)
- 1989 – Santa Sangre (as writer)
- 1987 – Distant Lights (as writer)
- 1987 – Brothers in Blood (as writer)
- 1987 – Hell's Heroes (as writer)
- 1985 – La gabbia (as writer)
- 1985 – Wild Team (as writer)
- 1984 – Let's See It Clear (as writer)
- 1984 – The Final Executioner (as writer)
- 1982 – Vieni avanti cretino (as writer)
- 1978 – How to Lose a Wife and Find a Lover (as writer)
- 1977 – California (as writer)
- 1976 – Street People (as writer)
- 1976 – Pure as a Lily (as writer)
- 1974 – Bang, and the Angels Sing (as writer and director)
- 1972 – The Master Touch (as writer)
- 1972 – My Dear Killer (as writer)
- 1968 – Eat it (as writer)

=== Television ===
- 2007 – Gente di mare (51 episodes – original idea and writer)
- 2002 – Vicious Game (TV movie as writer)
- 2000 – The Framing Game (TV movie as writer)
- 1999 – A High Price to Pay (TV movie as writer)
- 1989 – Ocean (6 episodes – as writer)
- 1974 – The Guardians (TV movie as writer and director)

=== Web ===
- 2017–ongoing Roberto Leoni Movie Reviews (171 episodes – as writer director and main role)
