= Savage Attack =

- Directed by: Tonino Valerii
- Screenplay by: Roberto Leoni
- Story by: Roberto Leoni
- Produced by: Eugenio Startari
- Starring: Bo Svenson; Carlo Mucari; Peter Hooten
- Cinematography: Giancarlo Fernando
- Edited by: Antonio Siciliano
- Music by: Riz Ortolani
- Production company: Three International Sisters Film
- Release date: October 1987 (West Germany)
- Running time: 90 minutes
- Country: Italy

Savage Attack (Italian: Brothers in Blood) is a war film directed by Tonino Valerii. It was written by Roberto Leoni after the success of several films based around veterans of the Vietnam War. The film starred Bo Svenson and Peter Hooten and was shot primarily in the Dominican Republic. It did not receive a theatrical release in Italy and was released on home video in West Germany as Brothers in Blood in 1987.

== Background and production ==
In the mid-1980s, the Italian film industry was losing its audiences dramatically with the number of filmgoers in 1980 being 241.8 million to 123.1 million in 1985. This led to smaller Italian producers making films that imitated English pictures for less demanding markets such as Central America and the home video audience. Savage Attack was part of this trend, being made after the popular success of the film Uncommon Valor (1983), though Roberto Leoni said the script was written before the success of that film. Brothers in Blood starred Bo Svenson, who had been a re-occurring actor in Italian cinema since the mid-to-late 1970s. Along with Svenson was Peter Hooten who had starred alongside the actor in several 1980s films including The Inglorious Bastards (1978). Initially, Leoni was working on a script for Enzo G. Castellari but after the budget was found to be too high he wrote the script that would become Savage Attack. Castellari was less interested and was committed to other projects, leading to the producer asking Tonino Valerii to direct the film.

Filming began in late 1985. Filming predominantly took place in the Dominican Republic with some scenes shot in New York. In Langdon Hammer's book on James Merill, Hooten's partner from 1983 until his death, Hammer noted that Hooten had been trying to find film work for about two years and was initially "thrilled" at the chance to work but puzzled later when he found himself being paid with satchels of Italian lire on the spot. Hooten later proclaimed in an interview with Italian film critic and historian Roberto Curti that he enjoyed working with Valerii on the film, but that it was an off-an-on again production.

== Release ==
Savage Attack was never released theatrically in Italy. It was released in West Germany on home video as Brothers in Blood in October 1987. It was released on video in the United States as Savage Attack. According to Svenson, as of 2015 he owns the American rights to the film.
