= California (1977 film) =

1977 film by Michele Lupo

- Italian theatrical release poster
- Directed by: Michele Lupo
- Screenplay by: Mino Roli; Nico Ducci; Franco Bucceri; Roberto Leoni
- Story by: Franco Bucceri; Roberto Leoni
- Produced by: Manolo Bolognini
- Starring: Giuliano Gemma; Miguel Bosé; Paola Dominguín; Chris Avram; William Berger; Raimund Harmstorf
- Cinematography: Alejandro Ulloa
- Edited by: Antonietta Zita
- Music by: Gianni Ferrio
- Production companies: Uranos Cinematografica; Belma Cinematografica; José Frade Producciones Cinematográficas S.A.
- Distributed by: Capitol International
- Release date: 1977
- Running time: 98 minutes
- Countries: Italy; Spain
- Language: Italian

California is a 1977 Italian-Spanish Spaghetti Western film directed by Michele Lupo. The film was generally well received by critics and was successful at the Italian box office.

== Plot ==
After the American Civil War, gunman California wants to renew his life. He changes his name to Michael Random and seeks a home where he can live in peace. In the war's aftermath he gets to know young Willy Preston. En route to Preston's family, Willy is killed by a gang of criminals under the helm of Robert Whittaker. California informs Willy's kin and falls in love with Willy's sister, Helen. One day California witness Whittaker and his gang robbing a bank and Helen is taken hostage. California is faced with the decision to resort to the merciless shootist he once was in order to save Helen from the desperados.

== Cast ==
- Giuliano Gemma: Michael 'California' Random
- Miguel Bosé: Willy Preston
- Chris Avram: Nelson
- Paola Dominguín (as Paola Bose): Helen Preston
- Raimund Harmstorf: Whittaker
- William Berger: Mr. Preston
- Ferdinando Murolo: Brook
- Robert Hundar: Eric Plummer
- Malisa Longo: Yasmin
- Dana Ghia: Mrs. Preston
- Romano Puppo: Gary Duke
- Franco Ressel: Full
- Enzo Fiermonte: Father
- Nazzareno Zamperla: Brother of Northern Soldier (uncredited)
- Piero Leri:
- Mario Novelli:
- Piero Morgia:
- Andrea Aureli:
- Franco Fantasia:
- Alfio Caltabiano:
