= A Heart in the Drawer =

- Directed by: Roberto Leoni
- Written by: Roberto Leoni
- Produced by: Mario D'Andrea
- Starring: Marianna Di Martino, Marco Basile
- Cinematography: Roberto Romei
- Edited by: Andrea Zoppis
- Music by: Giovanni Cernicchiaro
- Production company: MDL Creations
- Release date: 2016
- Running time: 5 minutes
- Country: Italy
- Language: Italian

A Heart in the Drawer (Italian: Il cuore nel cassetto), is a 2016 Italian short film against femicide written and directed by Roberto Leoni and produced by Mario D'Andrea. First release 24 September 2016 (Montreal, Canada) Views of the World Film & Music Festival 2016 - Official Selection First Italian release 29 November 2017 (Rome, Italy) RIFF Rome International Film Festival 2017

== Plot ==
A young woman's sensitive gesture is misunderstood by her partner causing an umpteenth row until a tragic end... But also this one will be officially filed as an accident, like too many other femicides caused by domestic violence... Under the auspices of Amnesty International in Italy "In five minutes of dramatic live broadcasting we assist to one of the many femicides. A shock that provokes an immediate reaction of condemn and refusal." Roberto Leoni

== Cast ==
- Marianna Di Martino as Francesca
- Marco Basile as Nicolò
