= Door to Silence =

Film directed by Lucio Fulci

- Severin Films DVD cover
- Directed by: Lucio Fulci
- Screenplay by: Lucio Fulci
- Story by: Lucio Fulci
- Produced by: Joe D'Amato
- Starring: John Savage; Sandi Schultz; Richard Castleman; Jennifer Loeb
- Cinematography: Giancarlo Ferrando
- Edited by: Rosanna Landi
- Music by: Franco Piana
- Production company: Filmirage
- Release dates: 11 December 1994 (London); 5 April 1998 (Rome)
- Running time: 91 minutes
- Country: Italy

Door to Silence (Italian: Le porte del silenzio), also known as Door Into Silence, is an Italian horror film written and directed by Lucio Fulci and produced by Joe D'Amato. It stars John Savage. This was the last film directed by Fulci.

== Plot ==
New Orleans, Louisiana. While attending the funeral of his father, Melvin Devereux meets a young woman who addresses him by name, although he cannot remember having met her before. Devereux later drives away, motoring aimlessly around New Orleans. Devereux decides to ignore warning barriers and drives onto a closed freeway. When the police follow him, he is forced to turn aside. His car breaks down in a dilapidated neighborhood. But the woman again appears, driving a red sports car. She suggests that he try a nearby mechanic to fix his car. After helping Devereux push his car to the garage, the woman again refuses to explain how she knows him or reveal her name. While waiting, she suggests they go to a motel nearby, apparently for sex. After checking into a room and getting ready in the bathroom, Devereux discovers that she is gone, leaving behind a message written on a mirror in red lipstick which says that the time is not yet right.

Having collected his repaired vehicle, Devereux encounters a hearse driving on the road ahead. When he attempts to overtake it, the driver deliberately swerves to prevent him. Turning off onto more treacherous country roads, Devereux nearly gets stranded when his car gets stuck in muddy terrain, and he barely negotiates a rickety wooden bridge.

Finding his way back to the main road, he stops off at a roadside bar for a drink. The hearse is also parked there. In a drunken altercation, Devereux challenges the driver to reveal whose body he is transporting. The folded ribbon adorning the casket seen inside the hearse bears a name similar to Devereux's own. Confused and frightened, he follows the hearse to a church where an all-black congregation is mourning at another funeral procession. Devereux drunkenly disrupts the proceedings, attempting to look inside the closed casket. He gets thrown out of the church by angry parishioners.

Devereux drives over to a nearby funeral home and sees that all of the corpses in the open coffins are labeled 'Melvin Devereux'. He finds his doppelganger lying dead in a casket and tries to touch the corpse, which disappears beneath his outreached hand.

Back on the road, Devereux picks up a female hitchhiker and tries to respond to her seductive advances. However, he cannot perform, forcing her to leave the car. Next, Devereux drives onto a river barge, which transports vehicles, including the hearse, to the other side of the river. Devereux rips open the hearse's back door and tries to open the coffin which bears his name. The hearse driver intervenes and there is a struggle. Devereux is subdued by other barge passengers and gets arrested. In a courtroom, Devereux is given a fine for defiling the casket. Devereux drives away and soon stops to visit a tarot reader. Reading the palm of his right hand, the palmist tells him that he has been dead for hours. She falls dead after receiving a phone call from a "Mr. Devereux."

Devereux is once more on the road, driving nowhere. He sees the hearse again and tries to overtake it, only to crash head-on into a truck. Devereux is killed instantly. His wristwatch stops at 7:29 PM, the same time as a car crash had appeared to kill his father. The woman who knew his name observes the accident a short distance away before getting into her car and driving off. Her license plate reads: D.E.A.T.H.

At the end, the text of a quote appears: ... When you go to the gates of nothingness, no one will be near you: only the shadow of your death ... Book Four of the Apocalypse. (Note: This is a translation of the actual Italian quote: ... Quando varcherai le porte del nulla, nessuno ti sara vicino: solo l'ombra della tua morte ... IV Libro dell'Apocalisse.) To date, it is not known who the author of this quote is, nor has any anonymous source been located.

== Cast ==
- John Savage as Melvin Dovereux
- Sandi Schultz as the mysterious woman
- Richard Castleman
- Jennifer Loeb as Margie
- Elizabeth Chugden as Melvnin's wife, Sylvia
- Joe Cool Davis as the minister
- Bob Shreves as the judge
- Mary Coulson as Melvin's Aunt Martha
- Fred Lewis as the bartender
- Dunca Boyer as the cajun hunter
- Maureen Rocquin as the juke box girl

== Production ==
Following the completion of Voices from Beyond, Lucio Fulci was approached by Aristide Massaccesi who read the short story "Porte del nulla" Fulci wrote, and suggested to adapt the story into Door to Silence. "Porte del nulla" was published in the anthology Le lune nere. Fulci recalled that Massaccesi encouraged him to go to New Orleans and to bring his daughter with him to assist on the film and save money on production. Fulci recalled that on arrival, none of his equipment worked.

The film was shot on location in Madisonville, Louisiana over an eight-week period in April and May 1991. Fulci said the film was completed in 1992.

== Release ==
Massaccesi said that Door to Silence "didn't even sell a single brochure." In Italy, it was released on videocassette and did not receive any large scale release outside of the country, partially due to the bankruptcy of the production company Filmirage. Fulci attended screenings of Sette note in nero and The Beyond in late December 1992 and early 1993 where previews of Door to Silence were screened.

Door to Silence was shown at the London Eurofest on December 11, 1994. It was shown later at the Rome Cine-club Detour screening on April 5, 1998.

It was released on DVD by Raging Thunder with a 90 minute running time and by Severin Films with a 87 minute running time in the United States.

== Reception ==
AllMovie opined that the film lacks "both the energy and invention of [Fulci's] more familiar work." In a 1997 interview, Joe D'Amato said he did not understand why the film was a commercial failure as he believed it was very good and he had even invested much money in the jazz soundtrack. In another interview in 1998, he claimed this to be "the best movie I ever produced".
