= Nick Boraine =

South African actor (born 1971)

- Born: Nicholas Boraine; 14 November 1971 (age 54); South Africa
- Education: University of Witwatersrand
- Occupations: Actor, voice artist
- Years active: 1996–present
- Notable work: Inside

Nicholas Boraine (born 14 November 1971) is a South African actor. He is best known for his recurring role as Kronos in Percy Jackson and the Olympians.

== Life and education ==
Boraine graduated from the University of Witwatersrand in 1994 with an Honours Degree in Dramatic Art. In March 2011, he joined Global Arts Corps as Associate Artistic Director. His father, Alex Boraine, is a former South African politician and former Deputy Chairperson of South Africa's Truth and Reconciliation Commission (TRC).

== Filmography ==
=== Film ===
- Inside (1996)
- Sweepers (1998) – Mitch
- I Dreamed of Africa (2000) – Duncan Maitland
- Operation Delta Force 5: Random Fire (2000) – Gary
- Witness to a Kill (2001) – Karl Wolf
- Slash (2002) – Billy Bob
- Promised Land (2002) – George Neethling
- Glory Glory (2002) – Frank
- Dead End
- In My Country (2004) – Jack Marlon
- Critical Assignment (2004) – William Le Trois
- Berserker (2004) – Clifford
- Cape of Good Hope (2004) – Stephen van Heern
- The Breed (2006) – Luke
- District 9 (2009) – Craig Weldon
- Jozi (2010) – Carl
- The Bang Bang Club (2010) – Colin
- Paradise Stop (2011) – John Sylvester
- The Salvation (2014) – Man With Cigar
- Assignment (2015) – Boris the Merciful
- Grimsby (2016) – Joris Smit
- Detour (2016) – Lecturer
- Money Monster (2016) – British Reporter
- Mandela's Gun (2016) – Cecil Williams
- Running for Grace (2018) – Danielson
- Bloodline (2018) – Lou
- Know Your Enemy (2019) – Steve

=== Television ===
- Hillside
- Crossroads (2006, TV Movie, SAFTA Award Best Supporting Actor) – Jimmy Black
- The Mating Game (2010) – Warren
- Binnelanders (2010) – Oliver Knight
- Homeland (2014) – Alan Hensleigh
- Black Sails (2015) – Peter Ashe
- The Gamechangers (2015) – Doug Lowenstein
- Chicago Fire (2017) – Dennis Mack
- Designated Survivor (2019) – Wouter Momberg
- For All Mankind (2022) – Lars Hagstrom
- Percy Jackson and the Olympians (2023) – Kronos

=== Video games ===
- Call of Duty: Black Ops 4 (2018) – Stanton Shaw
- Call of Duty: Modern Warfare (2019) – Norris
- Dragon Age: The Veilguard (2024) – Emmrich Volkarin

== Theatre ==
- Birdy - Vita Award Best Actor
- Popcorn - Vita Award Best Actor
- The Rocky Horror Show - Vita Award Best Musical Actor
- Shopping and F*cking - Vita Award Best Supporting Actor
- SIC
- Truth in Translation
- Faustus
- Metamorphosis
