= Dark Tale =

The Dark Tale
- Directed by: Roberto Leoni
- Written by: Roberto Leoni
- Produced by: Giulio Scanni
- Starring: John Savage; Claudia Gerini
- Cinematography: Giancarlo Ferrando
- Edited by: Mauro Bonanni
- Music by: Luis Bacalov
- Production companies: Filmirage, Eureka Films, Filmodeon
- Distributed by: Columbia Tristar
- Release date: December 1991
- Running time: 91 minutes
- Country: Italy
- Language: English

The Dark Tale (Italian: Favola Crudele), is a 1991 Italian thriller film written and directed by Roberto Leoni and produced by Giulio Scanni starring John Savage.

== Plot ==
On a desert island where she stays with her sister Beatrice and her nanny Martina, Angelica wishes she could have a handsome prince to play with. Not far from the island, a terrorist named Roy escapes while being transported between two prisons by boat. Together with the policeman he is handcuffed to, Roy is found by Angelica, who takes care of him, sure that he is her "handsome prince". The policeman falls into the sea and Beatrice and Martina die after strange accidents. Roy finally realizes that Angelica has killed them so that she can be alone with her "handsome prince". He trips and gets knocked out, and when he wakes up he finds he is bound and gagged. He meets an unpleasant fate.

== Cast ==
- John Savage as Roy Kramer
- Claudia Gerini as Beatrice
