= Promised Land (2002 film) =

- Directed by: Jason Xenopoulos
- Written by: Karel Schoeman (novel); Jason Xenopoulos
- Starring: Nick Boraine
- Music by: Arvo Pärt
- Release date: 2002
- Running time: 100 min.
- Country: South Africa
- Language: English

Promised Land is a 2002 film based on the 1978 English translation of the award-winning Afrikaans novel, Na die Geliefde Land (1972) by the South African author, Karel Schoeman.

The film was directed by Jason Xenopoulos and starred Nick Boraine; other cast included Lida Botha, Wilma Stõckenstrom, Louis van Niekerk, Tobie Cronje, Grant Swanby, Daniel Browde, Ian Roberts, Dan Robbertse and Yvonne van den Bergh. It was made on a budget of just over R15 (~2US$).

In 2002, it won the Best Screenplay Award at the Tokyo International Film Festival.
