= The Last Time I Committed Suicide =

- Theatrical release poster
- Directed by: Stephen T. Kay
- Written by: Stephen T. Kay
- Produced by: Edward Bates; Louise Rosner
- Starring: Thomas Jane; Keanu Reeves; Adrien Brody; John Doe; Claire Forlani; Jim Haynie; Marg Helgenberger; Lucinda Jenney; Gretchen Mol
- Cinematography: Bobby Bukowski
- Edited by: Dorian Harris
- Music by: Tyler Bates
- Production companies: Bates Entertainment; Tapestry Films; The Kushner-Locke Company
- Distributed by: Roxie Releasing
- Release date: June 20, 1997
- Running time: 92 minutes
- Country: United States
- Language: English
- Budget: $4,000,000 (estimated)
- Box office: $46,362

The Last Time I Committed Suicide is a 1997 American drama film directed by Stephen T. Kay. Based on a 1950 letter written by Neal Cassady to Jack Kerouac, it stars Thomas Jane as Cassady. The cast also includes Keanu Reeves, Adrien Brody, Gretchen Mol and Claire Forlani. It received a limited release on June 20, 1997.

The action of the letter took place in 1946, when Cassady was 20.

== Plot ==
Told from Neal Cassady's (Thomas Jane) perspective, in a form of a letter, the film follows his life before and after the suicide attempt by his longtime lover, Joan (Claire Forlani). Demonstrating Neal's active mind and ever-changing thoughts, the film jumps back and forth between before and after the attempt.

The story begins the day of Joan's suicide attempt, with Neal sitting in the hall outside Joan's hospital room. The story then jumps to the day before the suicide attempt, where a rain-soaked Neal whisks Joan away from her job. They have an intimate night together. After, she sits on the bed, sad, but Neal keeps professing his love to her. The scene returns to the hospital room, silence between them. Neal is told he has to leave.

The story moves ahead, with Ben (Adrien Brody) visiting Neal. He asks Neal if he has been back to the hospital to which Neal replies no. It cuts ahead to Neal wide awake, drinking coffee and eating bread with Ben. In a manic state, Neal tells Ben about the story he wants to write.

Neal encounters his friend Harry (Keanu Reeves), who suggests the two of them pick up some girls and take them out on a road trip in a stolen car. They all drive out into the country, flying down the roads. Later, at Neal's job at a tire plant, Neal's friend Jerry finds Neal obviously high, and saves him from getting in trouble.

Eventually, Neal makes amends with Joan, and decides to settle down with her. On his way to pick up a suit for a job interview, he runs into a drunk Harry, who asks him to come in for a beer. Neal ends up drunk, and Harry convinces him to call Mary (Gretchen Mol), his teenaged ex-girlfriend. When Mary sneaks out of her house, her mother calls the police, who arrest Neal just as he is about to leave. He is allowed to make a phone call, but he doesn't know Joan's phone number. When Mary refuses to testify against Neal, the charges are dropped. The police nevertheless hold him on the false premise of suspicion of burglary. After spending two weeks in jail, Neal is released. He goes to Joan's house, but finds it empty; he waits, but eventually it is obvious she isn't coming back. He walks back down the porch, steals a car, and disappears.

Neal finishes writing the letter and places it in an envelope. Walking away, he throws the pages of his novel into the air, paper flying and landing everywhere.

== Cast ==
- Thomas Jane as Neal Cassady
- Claire Forlani as Joan
- Adrien Brody as Ben
- Keanu Reeves as Harry
- Gretchen Mol as Mary
- Jim Haynie as Jerry

== Production ==
Filming occurred in Ogden, Utah and Los Angeles, California. It was the directorial debut of New Zealand-born American filmmaker Stephen Kay, whose prior credits included small acting roles on television.

In a June 1997 interview with E!, Keanu Reeves recalled "I knew Stephen. He had written this script about Neal Cassady. I told him I dug it. 'I dug it, brother'—one of the most fun things about the piece was calling everybody 'brother.' I love that fraternity. 'Hey, brother.' 'Hey, brother, man.'—and a couple of months down the road, Stephen asked if I was interested in playing Harry." He also revealed he was a fan of Cassady and other Beat writers as a teenager, reflecting that "To me, these writers represented the epic language they used invoking the Greek and Roman gods. That Bacchus and Dionysian aspect resonated with me, and I used that to try and read my life and break out of myself, search for new sensations--living the moment, staying up late, traveling, experiencing."

To better suit the role of Harry, Reeves allowed his weight to balloon out to 200 pounds. However, he had already gained a substantial amount of weight prior to accepting the role; this was due to a back injury he sustained in a game of hockey during the lead up to the filming of 1996's Chain Reaction. Reeves appeared at his normal weight in Feeling Minnesota—released in September 1996 between Chain Reaction (August 1996) and The Last Time I Committed Suicide (1997)—since it was filmed prior to Chain Reaction and the hockey injury.

== Music ==
The score was handled by composer Tyler Bates, who later collaborated with Reeves on the John Wick franchise. On July 29, 1997, a soundtrack album was released by jazz label Blue Note Records. It included the licensed jazz songs used throughout, as well as some of the original music created for the film.

== Release ==
After screening at the 1997 edition of the Sundance Festival in Utah, The Last Time I Committed Suicide was picked up by indie distributor Roxie Releasing. Their strategy for the film was to give it a platform release. Producer Peter Locke stated in early 1997 that "this is a film that appeals to a select niche and will be review-driven." The film would end up making only $46,362 against a budget of $4 million, following its release on June 20, 1997. It was intended to be released earlier in June, but was pushed to later in the month, as to avoid competition with Con Air and Speed 2: Cruise Control. A month prior to the release, director Stephen Kay commented in an interview that "the film was going to be released June 6, the day the potential blockbusters Con Air and Speed 2 are opening. I said, 'Do it! We'll just run an ad campaign that says, "The movie that Keanu Reeves did instead of Speed 2!"' But the distributors panicked...They decided the big monsters would gobble us up and backed off." Reeves at the time criticized the summer release date. He remarked "I think they've really picked a good time to bring this out--in the summer against Batman & Robin. [Laughs.] Stephen Kay and I both feel it should have come out in the fall, that it's a real fall picture. Know what I mean? It's 50 degrees in New York, you want to go see a picture. The Last Time I Committed Suicide, Neal Cassady...why not?."

The film was subsequently released onto VHS and laserdisc during 1997, and in its true aspect ratio, having originally been matted for theaters. On September 13, 2005, it was re-released onto DVD by Universal. The rights to the film are currently held by Multicom Entertainment, who purchased the library of producer Kushner-Locke in 2013. Multicom have since released it to streaming services Amazon Prime and Tubi.

On July 6, 2021, it was released to Blu-ray for the first time by MVD Entertainment Group.

=== Reception ===
The Last Time I Committed Suicide received mixed to positive reviews upon its release. In a review published on June 20, 1997, Stephen Holden of The New York Times praised the film's cinematography, writing, "Almost every shot is drenched in rich period detail so acute it has a surreal edge. When Cassady visits an office where one of his girlfriends works as a typist, the place is a hushed dimly lit cathedral to capitalism in which elaborately coiffed secretaries sit in rigid formation behind giant manual typewriters. Later, when Cassady and some friends steal a bright red convertible for a joy ride, the image of the cherry-red car jouncing through a field with snowcapped mountains in the background has the nostalgic tug of a Saturday Evening Post cover illustration." Variety remarked that the film "works well as an evocation of the youthful unrest that would soon find cogent subcultural expression."

A critical review came from CNN's Paul Tatara, who states that the film's style "gives you a major headache." He also criticized Reeves' performance, stating that the actor is "void of talent" and "reciting his lines as if they're non-related words strung together as a memory exercise." Tatara concluded by pointing out that "The degrading treatment of the women in the film is its most offensive element." Kevin Thomas from the Los Angeles Times had a more positive view on Reeves' role in the film, writing on June 20, 1997, that it "leaves you with a feeling of real respect for Reeves for showing up in this modestly budgeted film instead of Speed 2." However, he characterized Thomas Jane's portrayal of Cassady as "not all that distinctive", claiming that "we wouldn't have much reason to be watching this young man if his name weren't Neal Cassady." On a June 28, 1997 episode of Siskel and Ebert, The Last Time I Committed Suicide received a thumbs up from Gene Siskel and a thumbs down from Roger Ebert. Ebert stated that beat writer Lawrence Ferlinghetti, still alive, would have laughed at it. Three weeks later, Ferlinghetti responded to the program in a letter, in which he criticized the film for its "clean cut" portrayal of Cassady.

The Last Time I Committed Suicide was included in Magill's Cinema Annual 1998: A Survey of the Films of 1997, with the book stating that the film "has a beautiful and haunting look to it", and that "while not totally successful, The Last Time I Committed Suicide is nonetheless more successful at capturing the energy of the beats than previous films, such as Heart Beat (1980)." In a retrospective review, Levi Asher of Literary Kicks wrote, "As the world was waiting for Francis Ford Coppola to get busy filming his much-hyped and still-unmade version of On the Road, an unknown writer/director named Stephen Kay was quietly working on his own movie about the Neal Cassady legend. The most notable thing about it is probably the slick editing, which makes creative use of black-and-white, color, stop motion, etc., all blended into an easy-going, fast-moving, almost MTV-like whole. This film will not tax your brain."
