= Anna Maria Cianciulli =

Anna Maria Cianciulli is an Italian born Italian-American actress and academic known for her roles in film and television.

== Background ==
Anna Maria Cianciulli has had leading roles in film including as the mother in Downtown: A Street Tale (2004), Gertrude in Hamlet/Horatio (2021 - directed by Paul Warner), and Filomena Bene in Stealing Chanel alongside Lydia Hearst, Carol Alt, and John Rothman on the Lifetime Channel. On television she appeared as the character Juliana Chiari on the CBS television series East New York.

As a director Cianciull directed the short film "Stay" (2014) which was an official selection of the Manhattan Film Festival.

== Professor ==
Cianciulli is an adjunct professor at Columbia University and an acting for film instructor at the New York Film Academy both in New York City. She has also been an adjucnt professor at The Acting Studio.
