= While You Weren't Looking =

2015 film

- Film poster
- Directed by: Catherine Stewart
- Cinematography: Amelia Henning
- Production company: Out in Africa
- Release date: 28 October 2015
- Running time: 104 minutes
- Country: South Africa
- Languages: English; Xhosa; Afrikaans
- Budget: ZAR 8,000,000

While You Weren't Looking is a 2015 South African drama film directed by Catherine Stewart. The film examines the struggles experienced by lesbians living in suburban South Africa compared to those living in townships.

== Plot synopsis ==
20 years after the end of apartheid, Dez and Terri are a mixed-race lesbian couple living in one of the most affluent suburbs of Cape Town. Their adopted daughter, Asanda, who is 18, is of mixed racial heritage. Dez and Terri are being torn apart by their marital insecurities, while also facing social pressure to "be normal" and "fit in", in spite of the wide range of LGBT rights guaranteed by the post-apartheid regime. Asanda, is caught up in exploring her own sexuality, wavering between her boyfriend Greg, and queer "Tommy boy" Shado. The family housekeeper, who is from the same township as Shado, makes it clear that she is unwelcome in the upper-class neighborhood. Conversely, Asanda's first visit to the township makes her feel she isn't "black enough". The developing relationship between Asanda and Shado forces Dez and Terri to confront their own prejudices.

The film includes various takes on race and gender politics, from the personal stories of the protagonists, to the passionate voice of a university lecturer, to the images projected in the film. Subplots bring the suburban lesbians' lives into harsh contrast with the lives of queer women in the township.

== Cast ==
- Camilla Waldman – Terri
- Sandi Schultz – Dez
- Fezile Mpela – Joe Thulo
- Lionel Newton – Mack
- Petronella Tshuma – Asanda
- Thishiwe Ziqubu – Shado
- Tina Jaxa – Milly Thulo
- Jill Levenberg – Yasmin
- Terence Bridgett – Tiny
- Pascual Wakefield – Greg

== Production ==
The film was shot in and around Cape Town over 24 days, and is an Out in Africa Gay and Lesbian Film Festival production. The film received funding by the National Lottery Distribution Trust Fund and additional support from the Department of Trade and Industry, as well as a small grant from The Other Foundation.

== Release ==
The film's international premiere took place at the Miami Gay and Lesbian Film Festival on 2 May 2015, and the South African premiere was at the Durban International Film Festival on 20 July of the same year. The original cut of the film is 104 minutes, but a shortened version of 74 minutes was also released.

The film was an official selection of multiple international film festivals, including:

- Durban International Film Festival
- Miami Gay & Lesbian Film Festival
- Frameline39 San Francisco International LGBTQ Film Festival
- Torino Gay & Lesbian Film Festival
- Pan African Film Festival
- Outfest LA
- New York African Film Festival
- Cinema Queer Stockholm
- Utah Film Center
- Hamburg International Lesbian & Gay Film Festival
- Palm Springs International Film Festival
- Berlin Feminist Film Week

== Reception ==
Online magazine Spling! gave the film a "satisfactory" 6 out of 10 stars, positively citing the strong local talent, the incorporation of local music and art, and the beautiful photography. The review also opined that the theme of LGBTQ acceptance, as expounded upon by the academic lecture featured in the film, is too disconnected from the narrative itself, and also that each subplot was complex enough to warrant a vehicle of its own. The Back Row's review was harsher regarding the same issues, quoting "lovelorn gay lecturer Mack"'s cry that "If you can ‘queer’ gender, you can ‘queer’ anything" as the noble thesis of the film, calling for broadmindedness and acceptance for South Africa to move forward, but then condemns it as failing to match its vision with artistry, instead featuring clumsy dialogue and artificial performances.

Sharon Calingasan's FilmDoo review, on the other hand, found the film "compelling" and lauded it for taking on the larger issues of the LGBTQ community in South Africa, while celebrating "individuality and humanity in its truest sense." The GLIFF review of the film found the approach to dealing with LGBT, class and racial relations deft and sensitive, and reviewer Don Simpson felt that the "interjections from a queer theory class provides While You Weren’t Looking with an intellectualism that cleverly compliments and comments upon the narrative."

== Awards ==
Year	Award	Category	Nominee(s)	Result
2015	Pink Apple	Audience Award – Best Feature Film	Catherine Stewart (director); Nodi Murphy (producer); Warren Gray (production designer)	Won
2015	Queer Film Festival Bremen	Audience Award – Best Feature Film	Catherine Stewart	Won
2015	Tampa Bay International Gay & Lesbian Film Festival	Best Narrative Feature Film	Catherine Stewart	Won
2015	Long Beach Qfilm festival	Best Director	Catherine Stewart	Won
2016	South African Film and Television Awards	SAFTA Golden Horn for Best Achievement in Production Design – Feature Film	Warren Gray	Nominated
