= Claire Forlani =

British actress (born 1971)

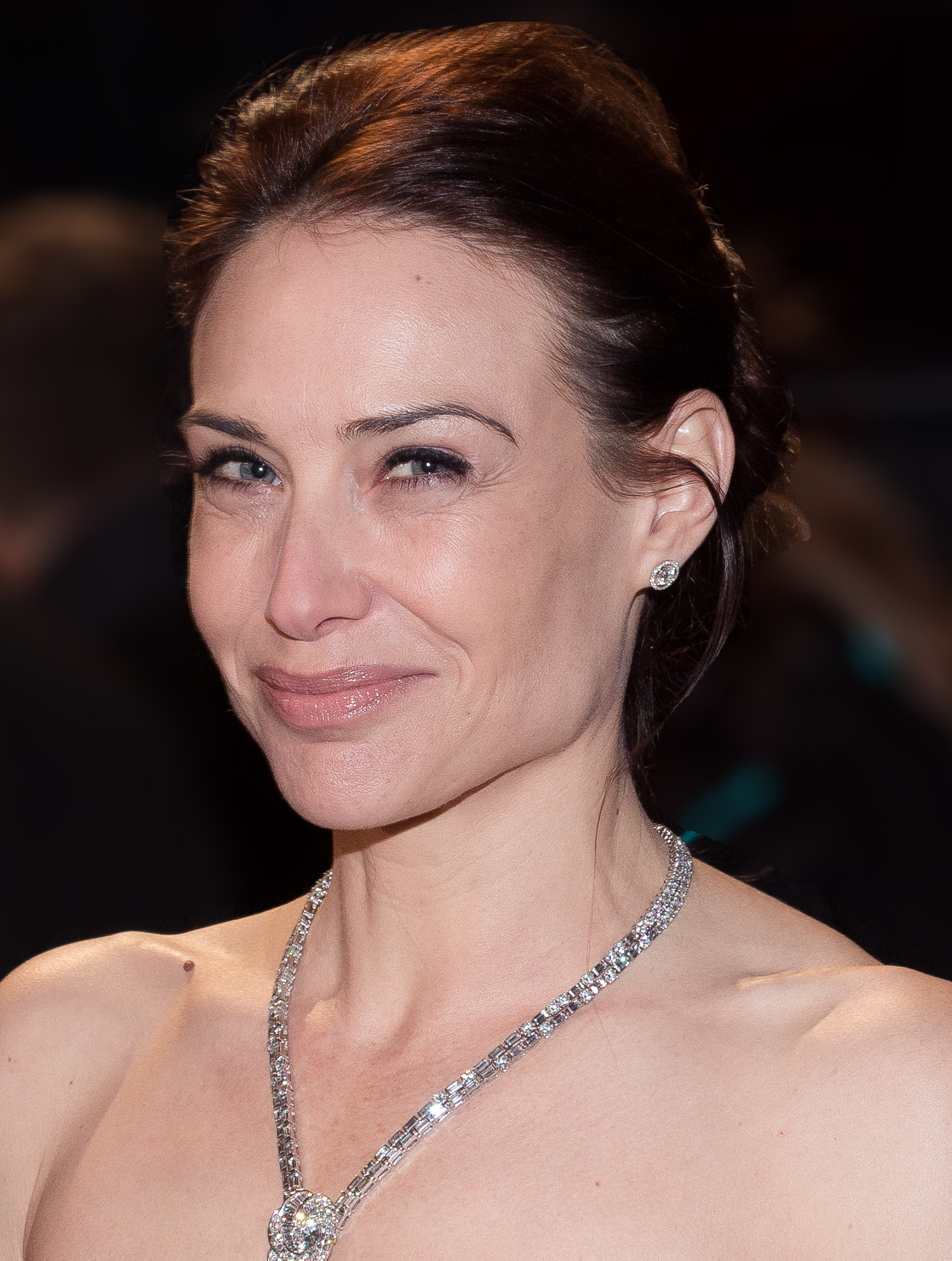
- Forlani in 2015
- Born: Claire Antonia Forlani; 17 December 1971 (age 54); London, England
- Other name: Clair Forlani
- Education: Arts Educational Schools, London
- Occupation: Actress
- Years active: 1991–present
- Spouse: Dougray Scott (m. 2007)
- Children: 1

Claire Antonia Forlani (born December 17, 1971) is an English actress. She became known in the mid-1990s for her leading role in the film Mallrats, and in the Jean-Michel Basquiat 1996 biopic Basquiat. In 1998, she achieved wide recognition for starring in the fantasy romance film Meet Joe Black. Her other notable films include Mystery Men (1999), Boys and Girls (2000), Antitrust (2001), The Medallion (2003), and In the Name of the King (2007). She appeared in numerous TV films and series, including a starring role on the historical-fantasy-drama series Camelot, and recurring roles on the CBS action series CSI: NY, NCIS: Los Angeles, and Hawaii Five-0. She played the role of Meredith Newman in the 2019 film Five Feet Apart.

== Early life and education ==
Claire Antonia Forlani was born on 17 December 1971 in Twickenham, London, the daughter of Barbara (née Dickinson), who was English, and Pier Luigi Forlani, an Italian music manager from Ferrara, Italy.

At age 11, Forlani entered the Arts Educational School in London, where she began to study acting. During her six years at the school, she also studied ballet, which led to performances on stage in The Nutcracker and Orpheus in the Underworld.

== Career ==
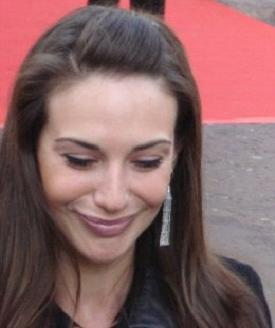
Forlani at the world premiere of Flashbacks of a Fool, 13 April 2008

Forlani's parents moved to San Francisco in 1993 to allow for wider casting opportunities in Hollywood films. Subsequently, she was cast in the television mini-series JFK: Reckless Youth and the film Police Academy: Mission to Moscow (1994). In 1995, she played Brandi Svenning in Mallrats. In 1996, Forlani appeared in a supporting role as Sean Connery's daughter in the film The Rock.

She continued to appear in both widely released and smaller-budget films, such as Basquiat, directed by Julian Schnabel. In 1998, she starred with Anthony Hopkins and Brad Pitt in Meet Joe Black. The following year, 1999, she starred with Ben Stiller and Geoffrey Rush in Mystery Men. In 2000, she starred with Freddie Prinze Jr., Amanda Detmer, and Jason Biggs in the romantic comedy Boys and Girls. In 2001, she appeared opposite Ryan Phillippe and Tim Robbins in Antitrust, a thriller released in January 2001.

Forlani was the new face of L'Oréal in 2001. She has been ranked no. 51 (2000) and no. 89 (2001) in Stuff magazine's "100 Sexiest Women", no. 85 (2001) in FHM magazine's "100 Sexiest Women" and was one of "Hot 100 Babes" in Loaded.

In 2003, she co-starred with Jackie Chan in The Medallion. In 2005, she appeared in Green Street Hooligans, with Charlie Hunnam and Elijah Wood. In Hallam Foe (2007), she starred with Jamie Bell and Ciarán Hinds. In 2006, she joined the cast of CSI: NY in a recurring role as medical examiner, Dr. Peyton Driscoll.

In February 2007, she portrayed Tori Bodeen in the film version of Nora Roberts's best-selling book Carolina Moon. In 2008, she starred opposite Daniel Craig in Flashbacks of a Fool. She acted in the independent film Amazing Racer (2009), with Julianne Michelle; the film did not have a theatrical release, and distributed directly to home video. In 2011, she played Queen Igraine in Camelot.

In 2010, Forlani appeared on NCIS: Los Angeles as Agent Lauren Hunter, temporarily replacing Henrietta Lange (Linda Hunt) as the operations director at NCIS at the end of season 2. She later appeared in season 3's finale. In 2016, the second episode of season seven of Hawaii Five-0 introduced Alicia Brown, a retired criminal profiler portrayed by Forlani.

== Personal life ==
On 8 June 2007, Forlani married Scottish actor Dougray Scott in Italy. They have a son born in 2014.

In 2017, Forlani revealed that she had "escaped" Harvey Weinstein five times, including twice in a hotel, and that she had a "disgusting" experience with the producer.

== Filmography ==
=== Film ===
Year	Title	Role	Notes
1992	Gypsy Eyes	Katarina	
1994	Police Academy: Mission to Moscow	Katrina	
1995	Mallrats	Brandi Svenning	
1996	The Rock	Jade Angelou	
1996	Basquiat	Gina Cardinale	
1996	Garage Sale	Julia	Short film
1997	The Last Time I Committed Suicide	Joan	
1998	Basil	Julia Sherwin	
1998	Meet Joe Black	Susan Parrish	
1998	Into My Heart	Nina	
1999	Mystery Men	Monica	
2000	Magicians	Lydia	
2000	Boys and Girls	Jennifer Burrows	
2001	Antitrust	Alice Poulson	
2002	Triggermen	Emma Cutler	
2003	Northfork	Mrs. Hadfield	
2003	The Medallion	Nicole James	
2004	Bobby Jones: Stroke of Genius	Mary Malone Jones	
2004	Gone Dark	Monica Prince	Direct-to-video
2005	Green Street Hooligans	Shannon Dunham	
2005	Ripley Under Ground	Cynthia	
2006	For Your Consideration	Herself	
2007	In the Name of the King	Solana	
2007	Hallam Foe	Verity Foe	
2008	Flashbacks of a Fool	Adult Ruth	
2008	Beer for My Horses	Annie Streets	
2009	Not Forgotten	Katie	
2009	Shannon's Rainbow	Christine	
2011	Love's Kitchen	Kate Templeton	
2013	Another Me	Ann Delusey	
2016	Precious Cargo	Karen	Direct-to-video
2017	Crystal Inferno	Brianna Bronson	
2018	Head Full of Honey	Head Mistress	
2019	An Affair to Die For	Holly	
2019	Five Feet Apart	Meredith Newman	
2020	Black Beauty	Mrs. Winthrop	

=== Television ===
Year	Title	Role	Notes
1991–1992	Press Gang	Judy Wellman	2 episodes
1993	JFK: Reckless Youth	Ann Cannon	Miniseries
2003	The Pentagon Papers	Patricia Marx	Television film
2004	Memron	Vangela Clay	Television film
2005	Shadows in the Sun	Isabella Parish	Television film
2006	Nightmares & Dreamscapes: From the Stories of Stephen King	Doris Frehman	Episode: "Crouch End"
2006–2010	CSI: NY	Peyton Driscoll	Recurring role
2007	Carolina Moon	Victoria "Tory" Bodeen	Television film
2009	False Witness	Pippa Porter	Miniseries
2011	Ice	Jacqueline	Miniseries
2011	Camelot	Igraine	Main role
2011–2012	NCIS: Los Angeles	Lauren Hunter	Recurring role
2012	Scruples	Billy Winthrop Ikehorn	Television film
2016	Running for Her Life	Allison	Television film
2016–2017	Hawaii Five-0	Alicia Brown	Recurring role
2017	The Get	Ophelia	Television film
2019	Departure	Janet	Main role
2021	Domina	Octavia the Younger	Main role
2024	Cruel Intentions	Claudia Merteuil	Main role
2026	Industry	Cordelia Hanani-Spyrka	Season 4
2026	Crookhaven	Carmen	
