= Gone Dark =

- Directed by: Lewin Webb
- Written by: Matt Holland
- Produced by: Gary Howsam; Jamie Brown
- Starring: Lauren Bacall; Claire Forlani; Henry Czerny; Pete Postlethwaite
- Cinematography: Curtis J. Petersen
- Edited by: Nick Rotundo
- Music by: Norman Orenstein
- Production companies: GFT Entertainment; Studio Eight Productions
- Distributed by: Cinemavault Releasing
- Release dates: August 29, 2003 (Montreal World Film Festival); June 1, 2004 (DVD)
- Running time: 92 minutes
- Countries: Canada; United Kingdom
- Languages: English; French

Gone Dark (also known as The Limit) is a 2003 Canadian-British crime drama mystery film directed by Lewin Webb, written by Matt Holland and starring Lauren Bacall, Claire Forlani, Henry Czerny and Pete Postlethwaite.

The film was screened at the Montreal World Film Festival on August 29, 2003, and initially released on DVD on June 1, 2004 under the title Gone Dark.

== Plot ==
This story takes place in an undisclosed area of New York City and is told in both real-time and multiple flashback scenes. Monica "Moni" Prince (Claire Forlani) is an undercover police detective working on investigating a heroin-dealing operation run by a gang who call themselves "The Crew". It is headed by Gale Carmody (Pete Postlethwaite) with whom Monica is forced to have a sexual relationship. At the same time, she is also involved with her undercover co-worker Dennis "Denny" Bowman (Henry Czerny). By this stage of the undercover operation, Monica is in way over her head, having little support from her superiors and is now actually addicted to heroin herself.

Denny lives in #403 in his apartment building and his neighbor, May Markham (Lauren Bacall) lives in #402. She is a deceptively guileful senior citizen. One evening at the complex mailbox area, Denny and Monica are together and it is here where she meets May for the first time. There is polite banter and the ongoing complaint that Denny and May chronically get each other's mail. They make the needed exchanges and each party goes their separate way.

Not long after that encounter, May is awakened one night by a gun shot. It is discovered that Denny was the one who had been shot. However, it's not clear if it was murder or suicide. Shortly after Denny's death, Monica comes to May's apartment in her role as an Inspector, hoping to get some answers. Denny was supposed to have received letters and packages that could implicate "The Crew" in heroin-trafficking, but they are nowhere to be found in his apartment. Due to the history of mail misdelivery, she asks if May had perhaps received these packages. May tells her she turned all of Denny's mail over to the police.

May has a physical therapist, Brian (Joris Jarsky), coming to her home on a regular basis. There is more to this than meets the eye. One visit, as he was setting down his bag, he notices a huge pile of mail with a rubber band around it wedged between the wall and her piano. May states that it was Denny's and it must have fallen off the piano and she had totally forgotten about it. Brian puts it on a table, unconcerned. May, however, immediately notices a suspiciously large, bulky, padded manilla envelope, and makes sure to hide the address. After Brian leaves, she opens it and is stunned by what she found: a copy of Brian's rap sheet and mug shot, a gun and what looked like either a cell phone or a digital recorder, both in baggies. May hides this package inside her upright piano.

As the story progresses, Monica returns to May's apartment after deducing that these items had to be in May's apartment. At first May claims to know nothing about them. Monica offers to make her some tea and drugs her so she can thoroughly search the apartment.

Due to Monica's persistence, along with the pressures of beginning violent heroin withdrawal, the two have intense interactions and May becomes fully embroiled in the dangerous mess of dirty cops, gangs and the illegal drug trade.

Outside on May's balcony, things do not end well for Monica Prince, severely despondent and still in extreme withdrawal, after calling for an ambulance and telling the dispatcher somebody's been shot, she commits suicide via self-inflicted gunshot wound. As for May Markham, we see her moving into a retirement community. She receives a box full of cash that Brian asked the movers to hand-deliver.

== Cast ==
- Lauren Bacall as May Markham
- Claire Forlani as Monica Prince
- Henry Czerny as Denny
- Pete Postlethwaite as Gale
- Joris Jarsky as Brian
- Barbara Gordon as Julie
- Joan Gregson as Nora St. George
- Janet-Laine Green as Agent Henry
- Roman Podhora as John "Little John"
- Billy Khoury as "Eightball"
