= Apartment 1303 3D =

- Theatrical release poster
- Directed by: Michael Taverna
- Written by: Kei Ôishi; Michael Taverna
- Based on: Apartment 1303 by Ataru Oikawa and Kei Ôishi
- Produced by: Cindy Nelson-Mullen; Michael Taverna
- Starring: Mischa Barton; Rebecca De Mornay; Julianne Michelle; Corey Sevier; John Diehl
- Cinematography: Paul M. Sommers
- Edited by: Mattias Morheden
- Music by: John Lissauer
- Production companies: 1303 Productions; MonteCristo International Entertainment
- Distributed by: Gravitas Ventures
- Release dates: December 6, 2012 (Russia); July 25, 2013 (United States)
- Running time: 101 minutes
- Countries: United States; Canada
- Language: English
- Box office: $3.3 million

Apartment 1303 3D is a 2012 independent supernatural horror film written and directed by Michael Taverna. The US-Canadian co-production is an English-language remake of the 2007 Japanese horror film Apartment 1303 (2007), which in turn is an adaptation of the novel Apartment 1303 by Japanese author Kei Ôishi, who is best known for having written the novelization to Ju-On: The Grudge (2002). The film stars Mischa Barton, Rebecca De Mornay, and Julianne Michelle. The film officially went into production in Montreal in early November 2011.

The film was released theatrically in 3D in Russia on December 6, 2012. In the United States, the film was passed over for a wide theatrical release, and was instead released to video on demand on June 17, 2013, followed by a limited theatrical release on July 25, 2013.

Apartment 1303 3D was universally panned by critics. The film grossed $3,377,891 worldwide, against a $5 million budget.

== Plot ==
Following a family dispute, Janet Slate (Julianne Michelle) moves out of her shared home into Apartment 1303 of a downtown Detroit building. After learning from a neighbor that a previous tenant died by suicide in the unit, Janet experiences supernatural events and is subsequently thrown from the balcony to her death.

Lara, Janet's sister, investigates the apartment and learns that a former resident named Jennifer suffered abuse, killed her mother, and died by suicide. Jennifer's spirit forces subsequent tenants to jump, ultimately causing the deaths of Janet's boyfriend and mother before Lara is arrested for the resulting homicide.

== Cast ==
- Mischa Barton as Lara Slate
- Rebecca De Mornay as Maddie Slate
- Julianne Michelle as Janet Slate
- Corey Sevier as Mark Taylor
- John Diehl as Detective
- Gordon Masten as O'Neil
- Madison McAleer as Emily
- Kathleen Mackey as Jennifer Logan

== Production ==
The Swedish director Daniel Fridell had originally been set to direct the project but was later replaced by Michael Taverna.

A specialised crew of 3D experts from Hong Kong were hired for the film. As part of her preparation for the role of Lara, Mischa Barton had her left nostril pierced with a small gold stud, but removed the piercing a few days later when director Michael Taverna decided that it did not suit her character.

== Release ==
=== Home media ===
The film was released to DVD by Phase 4 Films on September 24, 2013 after its video-on-demand debut, with no special features. A Blu-ray version of the film has yet to be released in the states. In the Netherlands, the film received a Region-Free 3D Blu-ray Disc with the original film included in a bonus DVD in the package.

== Reception ==
=== Box office ===
The film grossed $3,377,891 worldwide against a $5 million budget.

=== Critical response ===
Apartment 1303 3D was universally panned by critics. On the review aggregator website Rotten Tomatoes, the film holds an approval rating of 8% based on reviews from critics.

Justin Chang of Variety called the film an "inept and derivative tale" that is not unintentionally funny enough to be "so bad it's good". Frank Scheck of The Hollywood Reporter wrote, "This non-starter horror film, inexplicably released in 3D, won't haunt theaters for very long." Shawn Macomber of Fangoria rated it 1/4 stars and wrote, "The movie exhibits the germ of something that could potentially be a lot of fun on Saturday night basic cable. Problem is, its higher aspirations are a gauntlet thrown in the way of a deviously barmy romp."

Gareth Jones of Dread Central rated it 0.5/5 stars and wrote, "Bereft of interesting characters, dialogue, acting ability, scares, visual aplomb or much of anything else, Apartment 1303 is occasionally good for a derogatory laugh, or simply to witness what must be the middle of one serious mire in Rebecca de Mornay's career." Andrew Pollard of Starburst rated it 3/10 stars and wrote that "Barton and Michelle are just plain awful," and there is "no emotion, no care, no feeling and no reason to watch." Julianne Michelle's leading role as Janet Slate was singled out for criticism, with Niall Browne writing for Movies In Focus: "Julianne Michelle is embarrassing... her performance is painful to watch. She also looks ridiculous..." Entertainment Focus wrote that "Everything about this film is woeful.... this film is a huge clunker even in a genre filled with low budget movies. The scariest thing is how this could be released," and that "all three female leads are such bad actresses here that it’s difficult to think they have acted before."
