= Assignment (film) =

- Directed by: László Bene
- Written by: László Bene; Sandi Schultz
- Produced by: László Bene; Sandi Schultz; Gina Bonmarriage
- Starring: Sandi Schultz
- Cinematography: Brad Devine
- Edited by: László Bene
- Music by: Geo Hoehn
- Distributed by: Indigenous Film Distribution
- Release dates: 20 July 2015 (Durban International Film Festival); 26 February 2016
- Country: South Africa

Assignment is a South African political thriller, produced and written by László Bene and Sandi Schultz. It was directed and edited by Bene. Assignment was shot in 2014 in Johannesburg. It was shown in 2015 at various film festivals and was released in cinemas nationwide in South Africa on 26 February 2016, by Indigenous Film Distribution.

== Synopsis ==
Kathleen Jacobs, a renowned conflict journalist returns home after a near fatal-incident cutting short her assignment in the Congo. Her mission, while incomplete, is still a success; she uncovers what could lead to an incredible scoop. When Kat pitches the story to her editor, he turns her down - a strange decision for a man always on a quest for a headline. Kathleen, however, is determined to break the story; a decision that pits her against major political forces. When she refuses to back off despite numerous "incidents", Kat suddenly finds herself on the run, aided only by two ex's; her ex-husband and an ex-military consultant. What ensues is a cat-and-mouse chase that risks everything. Not only Kat's career and reputation are on the line, but also her life, as well as that of her family.

== Cast ==
- Sandi Schultz as Kathleen "Kat" Jacobs
- Gert van Niekerk as Nick
- David Dennis as Michael
- Nick van der Bijl as Ryan
- Jonathan Pienaar as Chris
- Hanli Rolfes as Dr. Pillay
- Peter Terry as Rick
- Anthony Oseyemi as Kumi
- Zonki Lungisa as Thug #1
- Martin Hadidani as Thug #2
- Dirk Stoltz as Johan
- Quanita Adams as Nurse Davids
- Justin Strydom as Hitman #1
- Theuns Coetzee as Hitman #2
- France Kalp as Reinhart
- Brent Quinn as Wikus
- Stephen Larter as D-Frag
- Corne Crous as Nerd
- Shawn Greyling as Vader
- Alistar Mathie as Hitman #3
- Heino Schmitt as Hitman #4
- Khanyi as Simpiwe
- Johan Baird as David
- Julian Sun as Jiang
- Retha Neethling as Sexy girl
- Rozanne McKenzie as Anchor
- Juan Le Roux as Hitman #5
- Nick Boraine as Hitman #6
- Alex Beyers as Hitman #7
- Werner Strauss as Hitman #8

== Release ==
- Official Selection - Durban International Film Festival
- Official Selection - Los Angeles Cinefest
- Official Selection - Lumiere Film Festival
- Official Selection - Silver Dollar Film Festival
