= Family Prayers =

- Poster
- Directed by: Scott M. Rosenfeld
- Written by: Steven Ginsberg
- Produced by: Steven Ginsberg; Charmain Jago; Mark Levinson; Johine Novosel; Bonnie Sugar
- Starring: Joe Mantegna; Anne Archer; Paul Reiser; Patti LuPone
- Cinematography: Jeff Jur
- Edited by: Susan Crutcher
- Music by: Steve Tyrell
- Production company: Earthquake Productions
- Distributed by: Arrow Releasing; Columbia TriStar Home Entertainment
- Release date: March 31, 1993
- Running time: 108 minutes
- Country: United States
- Language: English
- Box office: Unrecorded

Family Prayers is a 1993 American independent drama film starring Joe Mantegna, Anne Archer, Paul Reiser and Patti LuPone. It was directed by Scott Rosenfeld. It is notable for being the first film role of Brittany Murphy, who had a non-speaking role.

== Plot ==
Set in 1969 Los Angeles, this movie aims at nostalgia but really is more a depiction of the tragedy of a dysfunctional family. Young Andrew, a 13-year-old male on the brink of manhood, is saddled with a father who is a compulsive gambler and a mother who is immersed in a constant battle with him because of it. Often desperate for money, their dependence on Andrew’s aunt Nan for money is one more cause of tension and anxiety in an already unhappy household. As Andrew cares for himself and his younger sister, the symbol of his coming of age—his approaching bar-mitzvah—comes to symbolize more than just a rite of passage.

== Cast ==
- Joe Mantegna as Martin Jacobs
- Anne Archer as Rita Jacobs
- Tzvi Ratner-Stauber as Andrew Jacobs
- Julianne Michelle as Fay Jacobs
- Paul Reiser as Dan Linder
- Patti LuPone as Aunt Nan
- Conchata Ferrell as Mrs. Romeyo
- David Margulies as Uncle Sam
- Shiri Appleby as Nina
- Allen Garfield as Cantor
- Keaton Simons as Mark
- Milt Oberman as Al
- Gina Hecht as Arlene
- James Terry as Mike
- John Capodice as Barber #1
- Brittany Murphy as Elise

== Box office ==
Family Prayers was produced as an independent film. Due to its limited theatrical release, the film's box office gross went unrecorded by major tracking services before the movie transitioned to home video formats.

== Critical reception ==
Stephen Holden of The New York Times described the film as a "small, sentimental coming-of-age drama" that structuralized itself like a "Neil Simon memory play... but without the jokes."

Peter Rainer of the Los Angeles Times was heavily critical of the film's execution, labeling it "too wan and plodding". He wrote that the film suffered from an abundance of "glum virtuousness" that ultimately made it "boring."
