= Awakened (film) =

- theatrical release poster
- Directed by: Joycelyn Engle; Arno Malarone
- Written by: Joycelyn Engle; Christopher M. Capwell
- Story by: Joycelyn Engle
- Produced by: Joycelyn Engle; Julianne Michelle; Joseph Di Palma (executive)
- Starring: Julianne Michelle; Steven Bauer; John Savage; Stelio Savante; Bryan Dechart; Sally Kirkland; Edward Furlong
- Edited by: Rod Weber
- Music by: Kenneth Lampl; Darren Tate
- Production company: Supernova Media
- Distributed by: ITN Distribution; Supernova Media
- Release dates: October 18, 2013 (LA Femme International Film Festival); March 21, 2014 (United States)
- Running time: 111 minutes
- Country: United States
- Language: English
- Box office: Unknown (limited release)

Awakened is a 2013 independent supernatural horror film. It was co-written, co-directed, and co-produced by Joycelyn Engle, who also acts in the film, which stars her daughter Julianne Michelle as the lead character.

The film follows Samantha Winston (Julianne Michelle) as she returns to her hometown to investigate the mysterious death of her mother 14 years earlier. Believing her father is responsible, her investigation leads to supernatural visions that ultimately reveal the truth behind her family's past and her own existence.

The newly formed independent production company Supernova Media, founded and owned by its president Julianne Michelle, who was also the lead character in the movie, handled the film's production. Michelle also served as a producer of the film, as did both of her parents.

On the review aggregator website Rotten Tomatoes, the film holds an approval rating of 0% based on reviews from critics. On Metacritic, it has a weighted average score of 12 out of 100 based on 4 critics. Jeannette Catsoulis of The New York Times called the film a "poorly acted grab bag of shopworn ideas and hyperbolic behaviors," and Gary Goldstein of the The Los Angeles Times dismissed the film as an "ill-conceived and poorly executed ... forced, lifeless drama."

== Plot ==
Fourteen years after her mother's death, Samantha Winston (Julianne Michelle) returns to her hometown convinced her father, Jack (John Savage), was responsible for the tragedy. She takes a job at a local funeral home managed by family friend Lucas Drake (Steven Bauer), facing resistance from his business partner, Benny Dawson.

Samantha searches for clues from her uncle Thomas Burton and family friend Harriet Bendi, while experiencing visions of her mother and a mysterious man in a fedora. Ultimately, she discovers that she is already dead and possesses the ability to interact with the deceased.

== Cast ==
- Julianne Michelle as Samantha Winston
- John Savage as Jack Winston
- Steven Bauer as Lucas Drake
- Stelio Savante as Benny Dawson
- Edward Furlong as Thomas Burton
- Sally Kirkland as Harriet Bendi
- Bryan Dechart as Liam Dawson
- Sean Stone as Man in Fedora Hat
- Joycelyn Engle as Dr. Rockwell
- Kiva Dawson as Jennifer Winston
- Erin Gerasimovich as Young Samantha

== Production ==
=== Development ===
The newly formed independent production company Supernova Media, founded and owned by its president Julianne Michelle, who was also simultaneously the lead character in the movie, handled the production of the film. Michelle in addition served as a producer of the film.

Michelle's father, Joseph Di Palma, served as an executive producer of the film. Michelle's mother, Joycelyn Engle, co-wrote, co-directed, and co-produced the film, and also served as the vice president of Supernova Media.

=== Filming ===
Principal photography for the film began in September 2012.

== Reception ==
On the review aggregator website Rotten Tomatoes, the film holds an approval rating of 0% based on reviews from critics. On Metacritic, it has a weighted average score of 12 out of 100 based on 4 critics.

Jeannette Catsoulis of The New York Times called the film a "poorly acted grab bag of shopworn ideas and hyperbolic behaviors," and criticized Julianne Michelle's lead performance as overacting. The Hollywood Reporter called it "low-rent, convoluted ... [and] amateurish to the extreme," and opined that "Michelle mainly wanders through the film as if in a daze."

Writing for The Los Angeles Times, Gary Goldstein dismissed the film as an "ill-conceived and poorly executed ... forced, lifeless drama." He criticized the screenplay as full of "leaden dialogue and clichés," and noted that Michelle "looks a bit deranged."

== Box office ==
Awakened received a limited theatrical release, before moving to digital and video on demand platforms. Official box office earnings were not publicly recorded.

== Accolades ==
Award / Film festival	Category	Recipient(s) and nominee(s)	Result	Ref(s)
LA Femme Film Festival (2013)	Best Feature Producer	Joycelyn Engle and Julianne Michelle	Won	

== See also ==
- List of films with a 0% rating on Rotten Tomatoes
