= Downtown: A Street Tale =

- Directed by: Rafal Zielinski
- Written by: Joey Dedio
- Produced by: Maria Rita Caso; Helena Cynamon; Joey Dedio; Samuel H. Frankel; T.J. Mancini; Robert O. Ragland
- Starring: Joey Dedio; Eliud Figueroa; Geneviève Bujold
- Cinematography: Helge Gerull
- Edited by: Eric Chase
- Music by: Eleven; Robert O. Ragland
- Production company: Aloe Entertainment
- Release date: April 7, 2007
- Running time: 103 minutes
- Country: United States
- Language: English

Downtown: A Street Tale is a 2004 American drama film.

Its focus is on a group of teenagers and twentysomethings living in the basement of an abandoned factory on 10th Avenue in Manhattan. Their leader is ex-junkie and hustler Angelo (aka Kick), who serves as a father figure to the motley crew that includes gay African American hairdresser Lamont; mentally challenged Hispanic Tito; Latina stripper Ashley; upper class drug addict Hunter; Romanian prostitute Raquel; and newly arrived from Texas rock star-wannabe Billy and his pregnant girlfriend Cheri. Added to the mix are social worker Aimee Levesque, who operates the fictional shelter Haven House (based on the real-life Covenant House) and keeps an eye on Angelo and his street kids; and a pornographer, a strip-club owner, and a wheelchair-using drug dealer. Their stories are told in a series of vignettes unfolding in the days just prior to Christmas.

The melodramatic independent film, written and produced by Joey Dedio (who also stars as Angelo) and directed by Rafal Zielinski. In addition to Dedio, the cast of the Slowhand Cinema release includes Jeremy Alan Richards as Lamont, Johnny Sanchez as Tito, Rachel Vasquez as Ashley, Chad Allen as Hunter, Mihaela Tudorof as Raquel, James Ransone as Billy, Domenica Cameron Scorsese as Cheri, Geneviève Bujold as Aimee, Burt Young as the pornographer, Lillo Brancato Jr. as the strip-club owner, and John Savage as the drug dealer.

The film had its world premiere at the AFI Film Festival on November 7, 2004. Following limited releases in New York City and Los Angeles in 2007, it was screened twice at the Cannes Film Festival in May.

== Cast ==
- Joey Dedio as Angelo
- Eliud Figueroa as Guy In The Street
- Geneviève Bujold as Aimee Levesque
- John Savage as "H2O"
- Burt Young as Gus
- Lillo Brancato as Lenny
- Anna Maria Cianciulli as The Mother
- Irene Cara as neighbor (cameo)

== Production ==
The soundtrack, available on AJM Records, includes a jazz-infused rendition of the Petula Clark classic "Downtown" by Irene Cara and "Children of Color" performed by Clark. This was the last film to be scored by composer Robert O. Ragland.

The movie was Line Produced by Daniel Sollinger.

== Release ==
The film was released in theaters across the United States on April 7, 2007.

== Reception ==
The film has a Metacritic score of 44 out of 100. It has a 27% rating from 11 reviewers on Rotten Tomatoes. Jeanette Catsoulis of The New York Times said it was "a cross between "West Side Story" and a Nativity play." Kevin Thomas of The Los Angeles Times said "Dedio ... doesn’t define his characters strongly enough to involve the viewer in their fates very deeply."
