= Julianne Michelle =

American film and television actress (born 1987)

- Born: Julianne Michelle Di Palma; September 5, 1984 (age 42); Teaneck, New Jersey, U.S.
- Other name: Julianne Michelle Reeves
- Education: Marymount Manhattan College, Columbia University (attended)
- Occupation: Actress
- Years active: 1990–present
- Known for: Awakened (2014)
- Children: 2

Julianne Michelle (born September 5, 1984; born Julianne Michelle Di Palma; also known as Julianne Michelle Reeves) is an American film and television actress. In 2013, Michelle starred in the lead role of Samantha Winston in the independent supernatural psychological thriller film Awakened, which she also co-produced with her parents.

== Personal life ==
Julianne Michelle, daughter of Joycelyn Engle and Joseph A. Di Palma, was born in Teaneck, New Jersey. She lived as a child in Las Vegas and Manhattan, was briefly homeschooled, and graduated from Marymount School in Manhattan. She then graduated from Marymount Manhattan College, and attended graduate school at Columbia University.

=== Marriage and divorce proceedings ===
On November 21, 2015, less than a year after they met, Michelle married Karl Reeves, the CEO of an elevator installation and maintenance business in Manhattan. They had a daughter together shortly after. The relationship ended 14 months after they were married, in 2017, and that year Michelle filed for divorce.

The matrimonial and custody litigation that followed in the Manhattan Supreme Court involved disputes over child support and legal representation, as Michelle over time used and dismissed a series of 10 different divorce attorneys. In 2019, the Manhattan Family Court granted Reeves temporary sole custody of their child after determining that Michelle had fabricated abuse allegations against him.

== Career ==
=== Early years ===
Michelle was nominated in 1993 for her guest appearance in an episode on the television series Who's The Boss?, and in 1994 for "Best Actress Under Age 10 in a Motion Picture" for the independent movie Family Prayers. In 1996, she voiced the character Dot Hugson from the direct-to-video series The Oz Kids. In 1998, she and her castmates Jessica DiCicco, Keith Franklin, and Peter Tombaki received a joint nomination for "Best Performance in a TV movie/pilot/made for video Young Ensemble" for the unsold tv series pilot Bus No. 9. In 2001, after learning of Michelle from a press release sent to its office by her publicist, Teen People magazine included Michelle on its list of "One of 20 Teens Who Would Change the World".

=== 2009–present ===
Michelle acted in the independent film Amazing Racer (2009), for which her parents were producers, with Claire Forlani. The film did not have a theatrical release, and distributed directly to home video.

She was one of the female leads in the 2012 independent supernatural horror film Apartment 1303 3D. On the review aggregator website Rotten Tomatoes, the film holds an approval rating of 8%, based on reviews from critics. Andrew Pollard of Starburst wrote that "[Mischa] Barton and Michelle are just plain awful," and that there is "no emotion, no care, no feeling and no reason to watch." Niall Browne wrote for Movies In Focus: "Julianne Michelle is embarrassing... her performance is painful to watch. She also looks ridiculous..." Entertainment Focus wrote that "Everything about this film is woeful," and that "all three female leads are such bad actresses here that it’s difficult to think they have acted before."

In 2013, Michelle starred in the lead role of Samantha Winston in the independent supernatural thriller film Awakened; she was also a producer of the film, along with her parents. On the review aggregator website Rotten Tomatoes, the film holds an approval rating of 0% based on reviews from critics, and on Metacritic, it has a weighted average score of 12 out of 100 based on 4 critics. Jeannette Catsoulis of The New York Times criticized Michelle's lead performance as overacting, The Hollywood Reporter opined that "Michelle mainly wanders through the film as if in a daze," and Gary Goldstein of The Los Angeles Times wrote that Michelle "looks a bit deranged."

== Filmography ==
=== Independent films ===
Year	Title	Role
2006	The House Is Burning	Terry
2009	Amazing Racer	Shannon Greene
2012	Apartment 1303 3D	Janet Slate
2013	Awakened	Samantha Winston; lead role

=== Television ===
Year	Title	Role	Notes
1991	Who's the Boss?	Katie Havlock	Episode: "This Sold House"
1996	The Oz Kids	Dot Hugson	Direct-to-video series; Voice
1998	Bus No. 9	Delia	Unsold tv series pilot
