= List of video games based on films =

This is a list of video games adapted from films.

== Games ==
There are currently 616 games on this list. (Note: This number is always up to date by this script.)

Game	Year	Developer	Publisher	Film(s)
3 Ninjas Kick Back	1994	Malibu Interactive	Sony Imagesoft	3 Ninjas Kick Back
Licence to Kill	1989	Quixel	Domark	Licence to Kill
007 Legends	2012	Eurocom	Activision	Goldfinger, On Her Majesty's Secret Service, Moonraker, Licence to Kill, Die Another Day, Skyfall
007: Quantum of Solace	2008	Treyarch (Note: Ported to Microsoft Windows and Wii by Beenox); Vicarious Visions (DS); Eurocom (PS2)	Activision	Casino Royale and Quantum of Solace
102 Dalmatians: Puppies to the Rescue	2000	Crystal Dynamics	Eidos Interactive (PS1, PC, DC); Activision (GBC)	102 Dalmatians
300: March to Glory	2007	Collision Studios	Warner Bros. Games	300
A.D. 2044	1996	R.M.P. Software	LK Avalon	Sexmission
Action Man: Robot Atak	2004	Magic Pockets	Atari	Action Man: Robot Atak
Addams Family Values	1995	Ocean Software	Ocean Software	Addams Family Values
The Addams Family	1992	Ocean Software	Ocean Software	The Addams Family
Æon Flux	2005	Terminal Reality	Majesco	Æon Flux
Alex Rider: Stormbreaker	2006	Razorback Developments (Game Boy Advance); Altron (Nintendo DS)	THQ	Stormbreaker
Alexander	2004	GSC Game World	Ubisoft	Alexander
Alfred Hitchcock – Vertigo	2021	Pendulo Studios	Microids	Vertigo
Alice in Wonderland	2000	Digital Eclipse Software; Left Field Productions	Nintendo	Alice in Wonderland
Alice in Wonderland	2010	Étranges Libellules	Disney Interactive Studios	Alice in Wonderland
Alice no Paint Adventure	1995	SAS Sakata	Epoch	Alice in Wonderland
Alien	1982	Fox Video Games	Fox Video Games	Alien
Alien	1984	Concept Software	Argus Press Software	Alien
Alien 3	1992	Probe Software; Bits Studios (Game Boy version) Spearsoft (SNES version)	Acclaim Entertainment (Note: Released under the Arena Entertainment brand name on Sega systems and the LJN brand name on Nintendo systems.); Virgin Interactive Entertainment (Amiga)	Alien 3
Alien 3: The Gun	1993	Sega	Sega	Alien 3
Alien Trilogy	1996	Probe Entertainment	Acclaim Entertainment	Alien film series
Aliens	1990	Konami	Konami	Aliens
Aliens Online	1998	Mythic Entertainment; Kesmai	GameStorm; Kesmai; Fox Interactive	Aliens
Aliens: Colonial Marines	2013	Gearbox Software (Note: Additional work by TimeGate Studios, Demiurge Studios, and Nerve Software)	Sega	Alien film series
Aliens: Alien 2	1987	Square	Square	Aliens
Resurrection	2000	Argonaut Games	Fox Interactive	Alien Resurrection
Aliens: Extermination	2006	Play Mechanix	Global VR	Aliens
Aliens: The Computer Game	1986	Activision; Mr. Micro Ltd.	Activision (US); Electric Dreams Software (UK)	Aliens
Aliens: The Computer Game	1987	Software Studios; Mr. Micro	Electric Dreams Software; Ricochet	Aliens
Aliens vs. Predator	2010	Rebellion Developments	Sega	Alien vs. Predator (2004) and Aliens vs. Predator: Requiem (2007)
Aliens vs. Predator: Requiem	2007	Rebellion Developments	Vivendi Games (Note: Released under the Sierra Entertainment brand name)	Aliens vs. Predator: Requiem
All Dogs Go to Heaven	1989	Polarware/Penguin Software	Merit Software	All Dogs Go to Heaven
Alvin and the Chipmunks	2007	Sensory Sweep Studios	Brash Entertainment	Alvin and the Chipmunks
Alvin and the Chipmunks: The Squeakquel	2009	ImaginEngine	Majesco	Alvin and the Chipmunks: The Squeakquel
Alvin and the Chipmunks: Chipwrecked	2011	Behaviour Interactive	NA: Majesco; EU: 505 Games	Alvin and the Chipmunks: Chipwrecked
The Amazing Spider-Man	2012	Beenox (Microsoft Windows, Xbox 360, PS3, PlayStation Vita, Wii U, Wii, 3DS); Other Ocean Interactive (DS); Gameloft (AND/IOS/MOB/WM); Mercenary Technology (PSV)	Activision	The Amazing Spider-Man
The Amazing Spider-Man 2	2014	Beenox (Microsoft Windows, PS3, PS4, Wii U, Xbox 360, Xbox One); Gameloft (AND/IOS); High Voltage Software (3DS)	Activision	The Amazing Spider-Man 2
An American Tail: The Computer Adventures of Fievel and His Friends	1992	Manley & Associates	Capstone Software	An American Tail and An American Tail: Fievel Goes West
An American Tail: Fievel Goes West	1994	Shimada Kikaku; Hudson Soft	Hudson Soft	An American Tail: Fievel Goes West
Anastasia: Adventures with Pooka and Bartok	1997	Motion Works	Fox Interactive	Anastasia
Angry Birds Rio	2011	Rovio Mobile	Rovio Mobile	Rio and Rio 2
The Ant Bully	2006	Artificial Mind and Movement	Midway Games	The Ant Bully
Antz	1999	Panet Interactive	Infogrames	Antz
Antz Extreme Racing	2002	Supersonic Software; Magic Pockets (GBA)	Empire Interactive	Antz
Antz Racing	2001	RFX Interactive	Light & Shadow Production; Club Acclaim (North America); Electronic Arts (Europe)	Antz
Arachnophobia	1991	BlueSky Software	Disney Software	Arachnophobia
Arctic Tale	2007	Atomic Planet Entertainment	UK: Zoo Digital Publishing; NA: DSI Games	Arctic Tale
Around the World in 80 Days	2004	Pick Up & Play (Mobile); Saffire (GBA)	Thumbworks (Mobile); Hip Games (GBA)	Around the World in 80 Days
Arthur and the Invisibles	2007	Etranges Libellules; Neko Entertainment (DS); Mistic Software (GBA)	Atari	Arthur and the Invisibles
Asterix & Obelix Take On Caesar	1999	Tek 5	Cryo Interactive	Asterix & Obelix Take On Caesar
Asterix at the Olympic Games	2007	Étranges Libellules	Atari Europe	Asterix at the Olympic Games
Astro Boy: The Video Game	2009	High Voltage Software; Art Co., Ltd (DS)	D3 Publisher	Astro Boy
Atlantis The Lost Empire: Search for the Journal	2001	Zombie Studios	Disney Interactive	Atlantis: The Lost Empire
Atlantis The Lost Empire: Trial by Fire	2001	Zombie Inc.	Disney Interactive	Atlantis: The Lost Empire
Attack of the Killer Tomatoes	1986	Fatman, Dobbin, Stuart Ruecroft	Global Software	Attack of the Killer Tomatoes
Avatar: The Game	2009	Ubisoft Montreal	Ubisoft; Lightstorm Entertainment; Fox Digital Entertainment; Gameloft (iPhone, Mobile)	Avatar
Back to the Future	1985	Software Images (Mark Eyles, Martin Walker, Herv Jones, Mike Saxby)	Electric Dreams Software	Back to the Future
Back to the Future	1989	Beam Software	LJN	Back to the Future
Back to the Future Part II & III	1990	Beam Software	Acclaim Entertainment (Note: Released under the LJN brand name.)	Back to the Future Part II and Back to the Future Part III
Back to the Future Part II	1990		Arena Entertainment	Back to the Future Part II
Back to the Future Part III	1991	Probe Software	Image Works; Arena Entertainment	Back to the Future Part III
Bad Boys: Miami Takedown	2004	Blitz Games	Empire Interactive; Crave Entertainment	Bad Boys II
Ballistic: Ecks vs. Sever	2002	Crawfish Interactive	BAM! Entertainment	Ballistic: Ecks vs. Sever
Barnyard	2006	Blue Tongue Entertainment; Halfbrick (GBA version)	THQ	Barnyard
Batman	1989	Ocean Software	Ocean Software	Batman
Batman	1990	Data East	Atari Games	Batman
Batman	1989	Sunsoft	JP: Sunsoft; NA: Sunsoft; EU: Sega	Batman
Batman & Robin	1998	Probe Entertainment (PlayStation); Tiger Electronics (Game.com)	Acclaim Entertainment (PlayStation); Tiger Electronics (Game.com)	Batman & Robin
Batman Begins	2005	Eurocom (GC, PS2 & Xbox); Vicarious Visions (GBA)	EA Games	Batman Begins
Batman Forever	1995	Probe Entertainment	Acclaim Entertainment: BR: Tectoy	Batman Forever
Batman Forever: The Arcade Game	1996	Probe Entertainment; Iguana Entertainment; Iguana Entertainment UK (PS1)	Acclaim Entertainment	Batman Forever
Batman Returns	1992	Denton Designs (Amiga); Spirit of Discovery (MS-DOS); Aspect Co., Ltd. (Game Gear, Master System); Acme Interactive / Malibu Interactive (Genesis, Sega CD); Atari (Lynx); Konami (NES, SNES)	Sega of America (Sega versions); Konami (Nintendo/MS-DOS versions); Atari (Lynx)	Batman Returns
Batman: The Dark Knight	(cancelled)	Pandemic Studios	Electronic Arts	The Dark Knight
Batman: The Video Game	1989	Sunsoft	Sunsoft	Batman
Battleship	2012	Double Helix Games (PS3 & X360); Magic Pockets (Wii, DS & 3DS)	Activision	Battleship
Beauty and the Beast	1994	Probe Software	Hudson Soft	Beauty and the Beast
Bebe's Kids	1994	Radical Entertainment	Paramount Interactive; Motown Games	Bebe's Kids
Bee Movie Game	2007	Beenox (Xbox 360, PS2, PC); Smart Bomb Interactive (Wii); Vicarious Visions (DS)	Activision	Bee Movie
Beetlejuice	1991	Rare	Acclaim Entertainment (Note: Released under the LJN brand name.)	Beetlejuice
Beowulf: The Game	2007	Ubisoft Shanghai; Tiwak; Virtuos (PSP)	Ubisoft	Beowulf
Beverly Hills Cop	2006	Atomic Planet Entertainment	Blast Entertainment	Beverly Hills Cop film series
Beverly Hills Cop	1990	Tynesoft		Beverly Hills Cop
Big Rumble Boxing: Creed Champions	2021	Survios, Inc.	Survios, Inc.	Rocky franchise
Big Trouble in Little China	1986	Mev Dinc, Focus (as Software Studios)	Electric Dreams Software	Big Trouble in Little China
Bill & Ted's Excellent Adventure	1989	Off The Wall Productions	Capstone	Bill & Ted's Excellent Adventure
Bill & Ted's Excellent Adventure	1991	Mev Dinc, Focus (as Software Studios)	Electric Dreams Software	Bill & Ted's Excellent Adventure and Bill & Ted's Bogus Journey
The Black Cauldron	1986	Sierra On-Line	Sierra On-Line	The Black Cauldron
Blade	2000	HammerHead (PlayStation); HAL Laboratory and Avit Inc. (GBC)	Activision; Marvel Comics	Blade
Blade II	2002	Mucky Foot Productions	Activision	Blade II
Blade Runner	1997	Westwood Studios	Virgin Interactive	Blade Runner
Blair Witch	2000	Terminal Reality (Vol. I); Human Head Studios (Vol. II); Ritual Entertainment (Vol. III)	Gathering of Developers	Blair Witch media franchise
Blazing Lazers	1989	Compile	Hudson Soft; NEC	Gunhed
Bloodwings: Pumpkinhead's Revenge	1995			Pumpkinhead II: Blood Wings
Bolt	2008	Avalanche Software, Altron	Disney Interactive Studios	Bolt
Bram Stoker's Dracula	1993	Probe Entertainment	Sony Imagesoft	Bram Stoker's Dracula
Bram Stoker's Dracula	1993	Psygnosis (SNES, Genesis, CD, DOS, Amiga); Traveller's Tales (SNES, Genesis); Probe Software (NES, GB, GG, MS)	Sony Imagesoft; Psygnosis (Amiga, DOS)	Bram Stoker's Dracula
Brave	2012	Behaviour Interactive	Disney Interactive Studios	Brave
Braveheart	1999	Red Lemon Studios	Eidos	Braveheart
A Bug's Life	1998	Traveller's Tales; Tiertex Design Studios (GBC)	Sony Computer Entertainment (PS); Disney Interactive (PC); THQ (GBC); Activision (N64)	A Bug's Life
Captain America: Super Soldier	2011	Next Level Games; High Voltage Software (Wii); Griptonite Games (DS)	Sega	Captain America: The First Avenger
Cars	2006	Locomotive Games (PSP); Rainbow Studios (GameCube, PS2, Xbox, Xbox 360, Wii, PC, Mac); Helixe (Game Boy Advance, DS); Beenox (PC, Mac); Incinerator Studios (Wii)	THQ	Cars
Cars Mater-National Championship	2007	Rainbow Studios (PlayStation 2, Xbox 360, Microsoft Windows); Incinerator Studios (PlayStation 3, Wii); Tantalus Interactive (Nintendo DS, Game Boy Advance)	THQ	Cars
Cars Race-O-Rama	2009	Incinerator Studios (PlayStation 2, PlayStation 3, Xbox 360, Wii); Tantalus Media (Nintendo DS, PlayStation Portable)	THQ	Cars
Cars 2	2011	Avalanche Software; Firebrand Games (DS/3DS); Virtual Toys (PSP); GameStar (PC)	Disney Interactive Studios; Sony Computer Entertainment (PSP)	Cars 2
Cars 3: Driven to Win	2017	Avalanche Software	Warner Bros. Interactive Entertainment	Cars 3
Casper	1996	Funcom; Logicware (3DO); Bonsai Entertainment (GB); Imagineering (SNES); G3 Interactive (GBC); Planet Interactive (GBA) Morning Star Multimedia (PC)	Interplay Productions; Natsume Inc. (GB & SNES); Microïds (GBA); WizardWorks (PC)	Casper
The Cat in the Hat	2003	Magenta Software (PS2, Xbox); Digital Eclipse (Windows, GBA)	Vivendi Universal Games (Note: Released under the Coktel brand name in PAL regions.)	The Cat in the Hat
Catwoman	2004	Argonaut Games (Note: Additional work by EA UK.); Magic Pockets (GBA)	Electronic Arts	Catwoman
Chaos Island: The Lost World	1997	DreamWorks Interactive	DreamWorks Interactive	The Lost World: Jurassic Park
Charlie and the Chocolate Factory	2005	High Voltage Software; Digital Eclipse (GBA)	Global Star Software; 2K Games (GBA)	Charlie and the Chocolate Factory
Charlie's Angels	2003	Neko Entertainment	Ubi Soft	Charlie's Angels and Charlie's Angels: Full Throttle
Charlotte's Web	2006	Backbone Entertainment; Sega (PC); Atomic Planet Entertainment (PS2); The Code Monkeys (mobile)	Sega; Blast! Entertainment Ltd. (PS2)	Charlotte's Web
The Cheetah Girls	2006	Gorilla Systems	Buena Vista Games	The Cheetah Girls and The Cheetah Girls 2
The Cheetah Girls: Passport to Stardom	2008	Handheld Games	Disney Interactive Studios	The Cheetah Girls: One World
Chicken Little	2005	Avalanche Software (PS2, GC, Xbox, Microsoft Windows); Artificial Mind and Movement (GBA)	Buena Vista Games	Chicken Little
Chicken Run	2000	Blitz Games	Eidos Interactive; THQ (GBC); Activision (PC)	Chicken Run
Chłopaki Nie Płaczą	2005	L'Art		Boys Don't Cry
Chō Jikū Yōsai Macross: Ai Oboete Imasu ka	1997	Scarab	Bandai	Macross: Do You Remember Love?
The Chronicles of Narnia: Prince Caspian	2008	Traveller's Tales	Disney Interactive Studios	The Chronicles of Narnia: Prince Caspian
The Chronicles of Narnia: The Lion, the Witch and the Wardrobe	2005	Traveller's Tales	Buena Vista Games	The Chronicles of Narnia: The Lion, the Witch and the Wardrobe
The Chronicles of Narnia: The Voyage of the Dawn Treader	2010	Fox Digital Entertainment	Gameloft	The Chronicles of Narnia: The Voyage of the Dawn Treader
The Chronicles of Riddick: Escape from Butcher Bay	2004	Starbreeze Studios; Tigon Studios	Vivendi Universal Games (Note: Released under the Sierra Entertainment brand name in PAL regions)	The Chronicles of Riddick
The City of Lost Children	1997	Psygnosis	Psygnosis; PlayStation: NA/EU: Psygnosis; JP: GameBank	The City of Lost Children
Clash of the Titans	2010	Game Republic; Hexadrive; Glu Games (BlackBerry)	Bandai; Warner Bros. Interactive Entertainment; Glu Games (BlackBerry)	Clash of the Titans
Cliffhanger	1993	Spidersoft; Malibu Interactive	Sony Imagesoft; Psygnosis	Cliffhanger
Clive Barker's Nightbreed: The Interactive Movie	1990	Impact Software	Ocean Software	Nightbreed
Cloak & Dagger	1984	Atari	Atari	Cloak & Dagger
Cloudy with a Chance of Meatballs	2009	Ubisoft Shanghai	Ubisoft	Cloudy with a Chance of Meatballs
Cobra	1987	Ocean Software	Ocean Software	Cobra
Computerized Coloring Books	1992	Capstone Software	IntraCorp	FernGully: The Last Rainforest, Rock-a-Doodle, and Home Alone
Congo The Movie: The Lost City of Zinj	1996	Jumpin Jack	Sega	Congo
Constantine	2005	Bits Studios	SCi Games	Constantine
Cool World	1992	Twilight	Ocean	Cool World
Cool World	1993	Ocean	Ocean	Cool World
Cool World	1993	Painting by Numbers	Ocean	Cool World
Coraline	2009	Papaya Studio (PS2, Wii); Art Co., Ltd (DS)	D3 Publisher; Vivendi Games	Coraline
Creed: Rise to Glory	2018	Survios, Inc.	Survios, Inc.	Rocky franchise
The Crow: City of Angels	1997	Gray Matter	Acclaim Entertainment	The Crow: City of Angels
Curious George	2006	Monkey Bar Games; Torus Games	Namco	Curious George
Cutthroat Island	1995	Software Creations	Acclaim Entertainment	Cutthroat Island
Cyberwar	1994	Sales Curve Interactive	Interplay Productions	The Lawnmower Man
The Dark Crystal	1983	Sierra On-Line	SierraVenture	The Dark Crystal
Darkman	1991	Ocean Software; Painting by Numbers (NES)	Ocean Software	Darkman
Daredevil	2003	Griptonite Games	Encore Software; THQ	Daredevil
Days of Thunder	1990	Beam Software (NES); Argonaut Software (other platforms)	Mindscape Group	Days of Thunder
Days of Thunder	2011	Piranha Games (PS3, X360), Freeverse (iOS, PSP)	Paramount Digital Entertainment, 505 Games (PS3 version bundled with film)	Days of Thunder
Death Wish 3	1987			Death Wish 3
Demolition Man	1994	Acclaim Entertainment; Alexandria	Acclaim	Demolition Man
Demolition Man	1994	Virgin Interactive Entertainment; Alexandria, Inc.	Virgin Interactive Entertainment	Demolition Man
Dennis the Menace	1993	Ocean Software	Ocean Software	Dennis the Menace
Despicable Me: The Game	2010	Vicious Cycle Software	D3Publisher	Despicable Me
Dick Tracy	1990	various	various	Dick Tracy
Die Hard Arcade	1996	AM1; Sega Technical Institute	Sega	First three films in the Die Hard film series
Die Hard	1991	Pack-In-Video	Activision	Die Hard
Die Hard: Nakatomi Plaza	2002	Piranha Games	Sierra Entertainment	Die Hard
Die Hard Trilogy	1996	Probe Entertainment	Fox Interactive; Electronic Arts Victor (Japan, PS1); Sega (Japan, Sega Saturn)	First three films in the Die Hard film series
DinoCity	1992	Irem	Irem	Adventures in Dinosaur City
Dinosaur	2000	Ubi Soft Paris; Sandbox Studios (PlayStation version); Digital Eclipse (Game Boy Color version)	Ubi Soft	Disney's Dinosaur
Dirty Harry	1990	Gray Matter Inc.	Mindscape	Dirty Harry film series
Disney's Activity Center	1994	Disney Software / Disney Interactive; Gryphon Software	Disney Software / Disney Interactive	various Disney films
Disney's Animated Storybook	1994	Media Station (most entries); Pixar (Disney's Animated Storybook: Toy Story); Creative Capers Entertainment (Ariel's Story Studio [with Media Station], Disney's Animated Storybook: Winnie the Pooh and Tigger Too); Revolution Software (Disney's Story Studio: Mulan for PlayStation)	Disney Interactive	various Disney films
Disney's Aladdin	1994	SIMS	Sega	Aladdin
Disney's Aladdin	1993	Capcom	Capcom	Aladdin
Disney's Aladdin	1993	Virgin Games USA; NMS Software (NES version); Crawfish Interactive (Game Boy Color version)	Virgin Games; Sega (Genesis version); Ubi Soft (Game Boy Color version)	Aladdin
Disney's Beauty and the Beast	1994	Probe Entertainment	Hudson Soft	Beauty and the Beast
Disney's Beauty and the Beast Magical Ballroom	2000	Creative Capers Entertainment	Disney Interactive Studios	Beauty and the Beast franchise
Disney's Beauty and the Beast: A Board Game Adventure	1999			Beauty and the Beast franchise
Disney's Brother Bear	2003	KnowWonder Digital Mediaworks (PC); Vicarious Visions (GBA)	Disney Interactive	Brother Bear
Disney's Chicken Little: Ace in Action	2005	Avalanche Software	Buena Vista Games	Chicken Little
Disney's Herbie: Fully Loaded	2005	Climax Handheld Games	Buena Vista Games	Herbie: Fully Loaded
Disney's Lilo & Stitch	2002	Digital Eclipse	Disney Interactive; Ubisoft (Europe and Australia)	Lilo & Stitch
Disney's Pocahontas	1996	Funcom (Mega Drive/Genesis); Tiertex (Game Boy)	Mega Drive/Genesis: NA: Disney Interactive; EU: Sega; Game Boy; THQ (Black Pearl Software)	Pocahontas
Disney's Print Studio	1994	Disney Interactive	Disney Interactive	various Disney films
Disney's Stitch: Experiment 626	2002	High Voltage Software	Sony Computer Entertainment	Lilo & Stitch
Disney's Tarzan	1999	Eurocom; Digital Eclipse (GBC)	Disney Interactive; Activision (GBC, N64); Sony Computer Entertainment (PlayStation): JP: Konami	Tarzan
Don 2: The King is Back	2013	Gameshastra; Mango Games	Excel Entertainment	Don 2
Double Dragon	1995	Technōs Japan	Technōs Japan; SNK	Double Dragon
Dr. Seuss: How the Grinch Stole Christmas!	2007	Black Lantern Studios, Inc.	NA: DSI Games; EU: Zoo Digital Publishing	How the Grinch Stole Christmas
Dragon: The Bruce Lee Story	1995	Virgin Interactive Entertainment	Virgin Interactive Entertainment (Europe); Acclaim Entertainment (North America); Atari Corporation (Atari Jaguar)	Dragon: The Bruce Lee Story
Dragonball Evolution	2009	Dimps	Namco Bandai Games (Note: Released under the Bandai brand name outside North America.)	Dragonball Evolution
Driven	2001	Crawfish Interactive	BAM! Entertainment	Driven
E.T. the Extra-Terrestrial	1982	Atari, Inc.	Atari, Inc.	E.T. the Extra-Terrestrial
Ecks vs. Sever	2001	Crawfish Interactive; Zombie Studios (cancelled PS2 version)	Bam! Entertainment; Franchise Interactive	Ballistic: Ecks vs. Sever
Eko Eko Azarak: Wizard of Darkness	1995	WiZ	PolyGram	Eko Eko Azarak: Wizard of Darkness
Elf	2004	Jolliford Management Limited	Crave Entertainment	Elf
The Emperor's New Groove	2000	Argonaut Games (PS, Win); Sandbox Studios (GBC)	Sony Computer Entertainment (PS); Disney Interactive (Windows); Ubi Soft (GBC)	The Emperor's New Groove
Enchanted	2007	Altron	Disney Interactive	Enchanted
Eragon	2006	Stormfront Studios; Amaze Entertainment	Vivendi Games (Note: Released under the Sierra Entertainment brand name)	Eragon
The Evil Dead	1984	Palace Virgin Gold	Palace Software	The Evil Dead
Fantasia	1991	Infogrames	Sega	Fantasia
Fantasia: Music Evolved	2014	Harmonix	Disney Interactive	Fantasia and Fantasia 2000
Fantastic Four	2005	7 Studios	Activision	Fantastic Four
Fantastic Four: Rise of the Silver Surfer	2007	7 Studios (Wii / PS2); Visual Concepts (PS3 / Xbox 360)	2K Games	Fantastic Four: Rise of the Silver Surfer
Fantastic Voyage	1982	Sirius Software	Fox Video Games	Fantastic Voyage
The Fast and the Furious	2006	Eutechnyx	Namco Bandai Games	The Fast and the Furious: Tokyo Drift
The Fifth Element	1998	Kalisto Entertainment	JP: Hudson Soft; NA: Activision; EU: Sony Computer Entertainment; EU: Ubi Soft (PC)	The Fifth Element
Fight Club	2004	Genuine Games; Superscape (Mobile)	Vivendi Universal Games (Note: Released in PAL regions under the Sierra Entertainment brand name)	Fight Club
Finding Nemo	2003	KnowWonder (PC & Mac); Vicarious Visions (GBA); Traveller's Tales (GCN, PS2, & Xbox)	THQ	Finding Nemo
Firefox	1984		Atari, Inc.	Firefox
The Flintstones	1994	Ocean Software (SNES); Twilight (Game Boy); Foley Hi-Tech (Sega Channel)	Ocean Software	The Flintstones
Flushed Away	2006	Monkey Bar Games (PS2, GCN); Art Co., Ltd (NDS); Altron (GBA)	D3 Publisher	Flushed Away
Friday the 13th	1985	Domark	Domark	Friday the 13th franchise
Friday the 13th	1989	Atlus	LJN	Friday the 13th franchise
Friday the 13th: The Game	2017	IllFonic	Gun Media	Friday the 13th franchise
From Dusk Till Dawn	2001	GameSquad	Cryo Interactive	From Dusk till Dawn
From Russia with Love	2005	EA Redwood Shores; Rebellion Developments (PSP)	Electronic Arts	From Russia with Love
Frozen: Olaf's Quest	2013	1st Playable Productions	GameMill Entertainment	Frozen
Garfield Gets Real	2008	Zushi Games	Gravity I	Garfield Gets Real
G-Force	2009	Eurocom (PC/PS2/PS3/X360/Wii); Keen Games (DS/PSP)	Disney Interactive Studios	G-Force
G.I. Joe: The Rise of Cobra	2009	Double Helix Games (PS2/PS3/PSP/X360/Wii); Backbone Entertainment (DS)	Electronic Arts	G.I. Joe: The Rise of Cobra
Ghajini – The Game	2008		FXLabs and Geetha Arts	Ghajini
Ghost Rider	2007	Climax Action	2K Games	Ghost Rider
Ghostbusters	1984	Activision	Activision	Ghostbusters (1984)
Ghostbusters	2016	FireForge Games	Activision	Ghostbusters (2016)
Ghostbusters II	1990	Imagineering	Activision	Ghostbusters II
Ghostbusters: The Video Game	2009	Terminal Reality (Xbox 360, PS3, PC); Red Fly Studio (PS2, Wii, PSP); Zen Studios (DS)	Atari; Sony Computer Entertainment Europe (PAL PlayStation versions only)	Ghostbusters franchise
The Godfather	1991	U.S. Gold	U.S. Gold	The Godfather film series
The Godfather	2006	EA Redwood Shores	Electronic Arts	The Godfather
The Godfather II	2009	EA Redwood Shores	Electronic Arts	The Godfather Part II
The Golden Compass	2007	Shiny Entertainment; Artificial Mind and Movement (DS)	Sega	The Golden Compass
GoldenEye 007	1997	Rare	Nintendo	GoldenEye
GoldenEye 007	2010	Eurocom n-Space (DS)	Activision	GoldenEye
GoldenEye: Source	2010	Team GoldenEye: Source	Team GoldenEye: Source	GoldenEye
The Goonies	1985		Datasoft	The Goonies
The Goonies	1986	Konami	Konami	The Goonies
The Goonies	1986	Konami	Konami	The Goonies
Gotcha! The Sport!	1987	Atlus	LJN	Gotcha!
The Great Escape	2003	Pivotal Games	SCi Games (Europe); Gotham Games (North America)	The Great Escape
Green Lantern: Rise of the Manhunters	2011	Double Helix Games (PS3, X360); Griptonite Games (Wii, DS, 3DS); Other Ocean Group (iOS)	Warner Bros. Interactive Entertainment	Green Lantern
Gremlins	1984	Atari	Atari	Gremlins
Gremlins 2: The New Batch	1990	Sunsoft, Riedel Software Productions, Motivetime, Topo Soft	Sunsoft, Hi-Tech Expressions, Elite Systems, Topo Soft	Gremlins 2: The New Batch
The Grinch	2000	Artificial Mind & Movement (DC & PS); Konami Computer Entertainment Nagoya (GBC); Konami (PC)	Konami	How the Grinch Stole Christmas
Halloween	1983		Wizard Video	Halloween film series
Happy Feet	2006	Artificial Mind and Movement	Midway Games	Happy Feet
Harry Potter and the Philosopher's Stone	2001	Griptonite Games (GBA, GBC); KnowWonder (PC); Argonaut Games (PS); Westlake Entertainment (MAC); Warthog Games Limited (GC, PS2, Xbox)	EA Games	Harry Potter and the Philosopher's Stone
Harry Potter and the Chamber of Secrets	2002	Eurocom (GBA, GC, PS2, Xbox) (Note: Additional work by EA UK for GameCube, PlayStation 2 and Xbox.); Griptonite Games (GBC); KnowWonder (PC); Argonaut Games (PS); Aspyr (MAC)	EA Games	Harry Potter and the Chamber of Secrets
Harry Potter and the Prisoner of Azkaban	2004	Griptonite Games (GBA); KnowWonder (PC); EA UK (GC, PS2 & Xbox)	EA Games	Harry Potter and the Prisoner of Azkaban
Harry Potter and the Goblet of Fire	2005	EA UK; Magic Pockets (GBA & NDS)	Electronic Arts	Harry Potter and the Goblet of Fire
Harry Potter and the Order of the Phoenix	2007	EA UK	Electronic Arts	Harry Potter and the Order of the Phoenix
Harry Potter and the Half-Blood Prince	2009	EA Bright Light	Electronic Arts	Harry Potter and the Half-Blood Prince
Harry Potter and the Deathly Hallows – Part 1	2010	EA Bright Light	Electronic Arts	Harry Potter and the Deathly Hallows – Part 1
Harry Potter and the Deathly Hallows – Part 2	2011	EA Bright Light	Electronic Arts	Harry Potter and the Deathly Hallows – Part 2
Disney's Hercules	1997	Eurocom (PC, PlayStation); Tiertex Design Studios (Game Boy)	Virgin Interactive (PlayStation NTSC); Sony Computer Entertainment Europe (PlayStation PAL); Disney Interactive (PC); THQ (Game Boy)	Hercules
High School Musical: Makin' the Cut!	2007	A2M	Disney Interactive Studios	High School Musical
High School Musical 2: Work This Out!	2008	Artificial Mind and Movement	Disney Interactive Studios	High School Musical 2
Senior Year	2008	Griptonite Games	Disney Interactive Studios	High School Musical 3: Senior Year
Highlander	1986	Canvas (Roy Gibson, Simon Butler, Steven Cain, Martin Calvert)	Ocean Software Ltd	Highlander
Home Alone	1991	Bethesda Softworks (NES); Sega of America (GEN, GG); Imagineering Inc. (GB, SNES); Probe Entertainment (SMS); Manley & Associates (Amiga, DOS)	Toy Headquarters; Altron (PAL & Japanese versions of Nintendo-platforms); Sega (GEN, GG, SMS); Capstone Software (Amiga, DOS)	Home Alone
Home Alone 2	1992	Imagineering; Sega (Genesis); Manley & Associates (PC)	Toy Headquarters; Sega; Capstone Software	Home Alone 2: Lost in New York
Hook	1992	various	various	Hook
How to Train Your Dragon	2010	Etranges Libellules; Griptonite Games	Activision	How to Train Your Dragon
Howard the Duck	1986	Alternative Software	Activision	Howard the Duck
Hudson Hawk	1991	Special FX Ltd.	Ocean Software	Hudson Hawk
Hulk	2003	Radical Entertainment	Universal Interactive	Hulk
The Hunchback of Notre Dame: Topsy Turvy Games	1996	Disney Interactive		The Hunchback of Notre Dame
The Hunt for Red October	1990	Images Software Ltd.	Grandslam Interactive Ltd.	The Hunt for Red October
The Hunt for Red October	1991	Beam Software	Hi-Tech Expressions, Inc.	The Hunt for Red October
Ice Age	2002	Artificial Mind and Movement	Ubi Soft	Ice Age
Ice Age 2: The Meltdown	2006	Eurocom (PS2, GC, Xbox, Wii, Microsoft Windows); Amaze Entertainment (DS, GBA)	Vivendi Universal Games (Note: Released under the Sierra Entertainment brand name.)	Ice Age: The Meltdown
Ice Age: Dawn of the Dinosaurs	2009	EurocomArtificial Mind & Movement (DS)	Activision	Ice Age: Dawn of the Dinosaurs
Ice Age: Continental Drift: Arctic Games	2012	Behaviour Interactive	Activision	Ice Age: Continental Drift
Ice Nine	2005	Torus Games	BAM! Entertainment	The Recruit
The Incredible Hulk	2008	Edge of Reality	Sega	The Incredible Hulk
The Incredible Hulk	2008	Amaze Entertainment	Sega	The Incredible Hulk
The Incredibles	2004	Heavy Iron Studios; Helixe (GBA); Lavastorm Analytics (Mobile); Superscape (3D Mobile)	THQ; Disney Mobile Studios (mobile)	The Incredibles
The Incredibles: Rise of the Underminer	2005	Heavy Iron Studios(PS2, Xbox, GC) Beenox (PC, Mac) Helixe (GBA, NDS)	THQSega	The Incredibles
Independence Day	1997	Radical Entertainment	Fox Interactive	Independence Day
Indiana Jones and the Last Crusade	1991	Software Creations	Taito	Indiana Jones and the Last Crusade
Indiana Jones and the Last Crusade: The Action Game	1989	Tiertex Design Studios	U.S. Gold	Indiana Jones and the Last Crusade
Indiana Jones and the Last Crusade: The Graphic Adventure	1989	Lucasfilm Games	Lucasfilm Games	Indiana Jones and the Last Crusade
Indiana Jones and the Temple of Doom	1985	Atari Games	Atari Games	Indiana Jones and the Temple of Doom
Indiana Jones and the Temple of Doom	1988	Atari Games	Mindscape; Tengen	Indiana Jones and the Temple of Doom
Indiana Jones' Greatest Adventures	1994	Factor 5, LucasArts	JVC, LucasArts	Raiders of the Lost Ark, Indiana Jones and the Temple of Doom, and Indiana Jones and the Last Crusade
Iron Man	2008	Secret Level (X360, PS3); Artificial Mind and Movement (Wii, PS2, PSP, NDS, PC)	Sega	Iron Man
Iron Man 2	2010	Sega Studios San Francisco (Xbox 360, PlayStation 3, Nintendo DS); High Voltage Software (Wii, PSP); Gameloft (iOS, BlackBerry)	Sega; Gameloft (iOS, BlackBerry)	Iron Man 2
Iron Man 3: The Official Game	2013	Gameloft	Gameloft	Iron Man 3
Iron Sky: Invasion	2012	Reality Pump	TopWare Interactive	Iron Sky
The Italian Job	2001	Pixelogic	PlayStation: EU: Sales Curve Interactive; NA: Rockstar Games; Windows: EU: SCi Games; NA: Global Star Software	The Italian Job (1969)
The Italian Job	2003	Climax Brighton	Eidos Interactive	The Italian Job (2003)
James Bond 007	1984	Parker Brothers	Parker Brothers	Diamonds are Forever, The Spy Who Loved Me, Moonraker, and For Your Eyes Only
James Bond 007: Goldfinger	1986	Angelsoft	Mindscape	James Bond film series
Jaws	1987	Atlus, Westone Bit Entertainment (uncredited)	LJN	Jaws: The Revenge
John Wick Hex	2019	Bithell Games	Good Shepherd Entertainment	John Wick franchise
Journey to the Center of the Earth	2008	Human Soft	THQ	Journey to the Center of the Earth
Judge Dredd	1995	Probe Software	Acclaim Entertainment	Judge Dredd
Jumper: Griffin's Story	2008	Redtribe (Xbox 360), Collision Studios (PS2, Wii)	Brash Entertainment	Jumper
Un Juego de Huevos	2010	Fabrication Games	Zeebo Inc.	Una Película de Huevos
The Jungle Book	1994	Eurocom; Virgin Games USA	Virgin Interactive Entertainment; Nintendo Australia	The Jungle Book
Jurassic Park	1994	Sega-AM3	Sega	Jurassic Park
Jurassic Park	1993	Ocean Software	Ocean Software	Jurassic Park
Jurassic Park	1993	Sega-AM3	Sega	Jurassic Park
Jurassic Park	1994	Sega Multimedia Studio	Sega of America	Jurassic Park
Jurassic Park	1993	BlueSky Software	Sega	Jurassic Park
Jurassic Park	1993	Ocean Software	NA: Ocean Software; EU: Ocean Software; JP: Jaleco	Jurassic Park
Jurassic Park: The Game	2011	Telltale Games	Telltale Games	Jurassic Park
Jurassic Park III	2001	Konami	Konami	Jurassic Park III
Jurassic Park III: Danger Zone!	2001	Knowledge Adventure	Knowledge Adventure	Jurassic Park III
Jurassic Park III: Dino Defender	2001	Knowledge Adventure	Knowledge Adventure	Jurassic Park III
Jurassic Park III: Island Attack	2001	Mobile21	Konami	Jurassic Park III
Jurassic Park III: Park Builder	2001	Konami	Konami	Jurassic Park III
Jurassic Park III: The DNA Factor	2001	Konami Computer Entertainment Hawaii	Konami	Jurassic Park III
Jurassic Park Interactive	1994	Studio 3DO	Universal Interactive Studios	Jurassic Park
The Karate Kid	1987	Atlus	LJN	The Karate Kid and The Karate Kid Part II
King Arthur	2004	Krome Studios; Lavastorm Analytics (mobile)	Konami; Walt Disney Internet Group (mobile)	King Arthur
King Kong	1982	Tigervision	Tigervision	King Kong
King Kong	2005	Ubisoft Pictures	Ubisoft	King Kong (2005)
Kirikou	2001	Étranges Libellules (PS); Planet Interactive (GBC); Krysalide (PC)	Wanadoo	Kirikou and the Sorceress
Kick-Ass: The Game	2010	Frozen Codebase	Frozen Codebase (iOS); WHA Entertainment (PSN)	Kick-Ass
Kick-Ass 2: The Game	2014	Freedom Factory Studios	UIG Entertainment	Kick-Ass 2
Krull	1983	Atari, Inc.	Atari, Inc.	Krull
Kung Fu Panda	2008	Luxoflux (PlayStation 3, Xbox 360); Beenox (PC); XPEC Entertainment (PlayStation 2, Wii); Vicarious Visions (Nintendo DS)	Activision	Kung Fu Panda
Kung Fu Panda 2	2011	Griptonite Games	THQ	Kung Fu Panda 2
Kung Fu Panda World	2010		DreamWorks Animation	Kung Fu Panda franchise
Kung Fu Panda: Legendary Warriors	2008	Artificial Mind and Movement	Activision	Kung Fu Panda franchise
Kung Fu Panda: Showdown of Legendary Legends	2015	Vicious Cycle Software	Little Orbit	Kung Fu Panda franchise
Kung-Fu Master	1984	Irem (arcade); Nintendo (NES)	Irem (JPN arcade); Data East (NA arcade); Nintendo (Worldwide NES)	Wheels on Meals
Labyrinth: The Computer Game	1986	Lucasfilm Games	Activision	Labyrinth
List of The Land Before Time video games	1997			The Land Before Time film franchise
Land of the Dead: Road to Fiddler's Green	2005	Brainbox Games	Groove Games	Land of the Dead
Last Action Hero	1993	NES: Teeny Weeny Games; SNES/Genesis/Game Boy/Game Gear: Bits Studios; Commodore Amiga: Psygnosis; Amiga: The Dome Software Developments	Sony Imagesoft; Psygnosis	Last Action Hero
The Last Airbender	2010	THQ Studio Australia (Wii); Halfbrick Studios (DS)	THQ	The Last Airbender
The Lawnmower Man	1992	The Sales Curve	SNES: NA: THQ; EU: Storm; JP: Coconuts Japan; Sega Genesis, Sega CD: NA: Time Warner Interactive; EU: Time Warner Interactive	The Lawnmower Man
Legend of the Guardians: The Owls of Ga'Hoole	2010	Krome Studios; Tantalus Media (Nintendo DS)	Warner Bros. Interactive Entertainment	Legend of the Guardians: The Owls of Ga'Hoole
Lego The Hobbit	2014	Traveller's Tales; TT Fusion (handheld)	Warner Bros. Interactive Entertainment; Feral Interactive (OS X)	An Unexpected Journey and The Desolation of Smaug
Lego Indiana Jones The Original Adventures	2008	Traveller's Tales	LucasArts	Raiders of The Lost Ark, Indiana Jones and the Temple of Doom, and Indiana Jones and the Last Crusade
LEGO Indiana Jones 2: The Adventure Continues	2009	Traveller's Tales	LucasArts	Raiders of The Lost Ark, Indiana Jones and the Temple of Doom, Indiana Jones and the Last Crusade, and Indiana Jones and the Kingdom of the Crystal Skull
Lego Jurassic World	2015	TT Fusion	Warner Bros. Interactive Entertainment; Feral Interactive (OS X)	Jurassic World
Lego Marvel's Avengers	2016	Traveller's Tales; TT Fusion (handheld)	Warner Bros. Interactive Entertainment; Feral Interactive (OS X)	several Marvel Cinematic Universe films
Lego Star Wars: The Skywalker Saga	2022	Traveller's Tales	Warner Bros. Interactive Entertainment	Skywalker Saga films
The Lego Batman Movie Game	2017	The Lego Group	Warner Bros. Interactive Entertainment	The Lego Batman Movie
The Lego Movie Videogame	2014	TT Fusion	Warner Bros. Interactive Entertainment; Feral Interactive (OS X)	The Lego Movie
The Lego Movie 2 Videogame	2019	Traveller's Tales	Warner Bros. Interactive Entertainment; Feral Interactive (OS X)	The Lego Movie 2
The Lego Ninjago Movie Video Game	2017	TT Fusion	Warner Bros. Interactive Entertainment	The Lego Ninjago Movie
Lego The Lord of the Rings	2013	Traveller's Tales; TT Fusion (handheld/mobile)	Warner Bros. Interactive Entertainment; Feral Interactive (OS X)	The Lord of the Rings film trilogy
Lemony Snicket's A Series of Unfortunate Events	2004	Adrenium Games (console); KnowWonder (PC); JAMDAT (Java ME version)	Activision	Lemony Snicket's A Series of Unfortunate Events
Lethal Weapon	1992	Ocean Software Eurocom (NES)	Ocean Software	Lethal Weapon
Lilo & Stitch: Trouble in Paradise	2002	Blitz Games	Sony Computer Entertainment (PS); Disney Interactive (Windows)	Lilo & Stitch
The Lion King	1994	Westwood Studios	Virgin Interactive Entertainment (Note: The Sega versions were co-published by Sega)	The Lion King
The Lion King 1½	2003	Vicarious Visions	Disney Interactive	The Lion King 1½
The Lion King: Simba's Mighty Adventure	2000	Paradox Development (PS1); Torus Games (GBC)	Activision	The Lion King
The Little Mermaid	1991	Capcom	Capcom	The Little Mermaid
Little Nicky	2000	Digital Eclipse	Ubi Soft	Little Nicky
Live and Let Die	1988	Elite Systems International	Domark	Live and Let Die
The Living Daylights	1987	Melbourne House, Sculptured Software	Domark	The Living Daylights
Looney Tunes: Back in Action	2003	Warthog Games	Electronic Arts	Looney Tunes: Back in Action
The Lord of the Rings: Aragorn's Quest	2010	Headstrong Games	Warner Bros. Interactive Entertainment	Lord of the Rings film trilogy
The Lord of the Rings: The Return of the King	2003	EA Redwood Shores	EA Games	The Lord of the Rings: The Return of the King
The Lord of the Rings: The Third Age	2004	Griptonite Games	Electronic Arts	Lord of the Rings film trilogy
The Lord of the Rings: The Third Age	2004	EA Redwood Shores	EA Games	Lord of the Rings film trilogy
The Lord of the Rings: The Two Towers	2002	Stormfront Studios	EA Games	The Lord of the Rings: The Fellowship of the Ring and The Lord of the Rings: The Two Towers
The Lord of the Rings: War in the North	2011	Snowblind Studios	Warner Bros. Interactive Entertainment; Feral Interactive (OS X)	Lord of the Rings film trilogy
The Lost World: Jurassic Park	1997	Sega AM3	Sega	The Lost World: Jurassic Park
The Lost World: Jurassic Park	1997	Aspect (Game Gear); Tiger (Game.com); Torus (Game Boy)	Sega (Game Gear); Tiger (Game.com and R-Zone); THQ (Game Boy)	The Lost World: Jurassic Park
	1997	DreamWorks Interactive (PS); Appaloosa Interactive (SAT)	Electronic Arts (PS); Sega (SAT)	The Lost World: Jurassic Park
The Lost World: Jurassic Park	1997	Appaloosa Interactive	Sega	The Lost World: Jurassic Park
Mad Max	1990	Mindscape	Mindscape	Mad Max 2
Mad Max	2015	Avalanche Studios	Warner Bros. Interactive Entertainment	Mad Max franchise
Madagascar	2005	Toys for Bob (Note: Ported to Microsoft Windows by Beenox); Vicarious Visions (Handhelds)	Activision	Madagascar
Madagascar Kartz	2009	Sidhe Interactive; Virtuos (DS)	Activision	Madagascar
Madagascar: Escape 2 Africa	2008	Toys for Bob; Griptonite Games (NDS); Aspyr Media (Windows); Idol Minds (PS2)	Activision	Madagascar: Escape 2 Africa
Madagascar: Operation Penguin	2005	Vicarious Visions	Activision	Madagascar
Manos: The Hands of Fate	2012	FreakZone	FreakZone	Manos: The Hands of Fate
The Mask	1995	Black Pearl Software	NA: Black Pearl Software; EU: Black Pearl Software; JP: Virgin Interactive Entertainment	The Mask
Masters of the Universe: The Movie	1987	Gremlin Graphics	Gremlin Graphics	Masters of the Universe
Meet the Robinsons	2007	Climax Group (DS, GBA); Avalanche Software (GC, PC, PS2); Buena Vista Games (Wii, 360)	Disney Interactive Studios	Meet the Robinsons
Megamind	2010	THQ Studio Australia (Xbox 360, PS3, Wii); Tantalus Media (PSP, DS)	THQ	Megamind
Men in Black II: Alien Escape	2002	Infogrames Melbourne House (Note: Ported to GameCube by Tantalus.)	Infogrames	Men in Black II
Men in Black: The Game	1997	Gigawatt Studios	SouthPeak Interactive (North America); Gremlin Interactive (Europe)	Men in Black
Miami Vice: The Game	2006	Rebellion Developments	Vivendi Universal Games (Note: Released under the Sierra Entertainment brand name in all regions except Japan)	Miami Vice
MIB: Alien Crisis	2012	Fun Labs	Activision	Men in Black 3
Michael Jackson's Moonwalker	1990			Moonwalker
Monsters, Inc.	2001	Vicarious Visions (GBC); Natsume Co., Ltd. (GBA); Kodiak Interactive (PS2)	THQ (GBC & GBA); Sony Computer Entertainment (PS2)	Monsters, Inc.
Mighty Morphin Power Rangers:The Movie	1995			Mighty Morphin Power Rangers: The Movie
Minority Report: Everybody Runs	2002	Treyarch; Torus Games (GBA)	Activision	Minority Report
Mission: Impossible	1998	Infogrames	Ocean Software: Nintendo 64; NA: Ocean Software; EU: Infogrames PlayStation; NA/EU: Infogrames	Mission: Impossible
Monster House	2006	Artificial Mind and Movement	THQ	Monster House
Monsters vs. Aliens	2009	Beenox; Amaze Entertainment (Nintendo DS)	Activision	Monsters vs. Aliens
Monty Python & the Quest for the Holy Grail	1996	7th Level	7th Level, Panasonic Interactive Media	Monty Python and the Holy Grail
Monty Python's Cow Tossing	2011	Luma Arcade	Zed Group	Monty Python and the Holy Grail
Monty Python's The Meaning of Life	1997	7th Level	7th Level, Panasonic Interactive Media	Monty Python's The Meaning of Life
The Mummy Demastered	2017	WayForward Technologies	WayForward Technologies	The Mummy (2017)
The Mummy: Tomb of the Dragon Emperor	2008	Eurocom (PlayStation 2 and Wii); A2M (Nintendo DS)	Vivendi Games (Note: Released under the Sierra Entertainment brand name)	The Mummy: Tomb of the Dragon Emperor
Muppet Treasure Island	1996		Activision	Muppet Treasure Island
The Muppets Movie Adventures	2014	Virtual Toys	Sony Computer Entertainment	The Muppets and Muppets Most Wanted
Nacho Libre	2006	Majesco	Nick Games	Nacho Libre
Napoleon Dynamite: The Game	2007	7 Studios	Crave Entertainment	Napoleon Dynamite
New York Race	2001	Kalisto Entertainment	Wanadoo Edition	The Fifth Element
Night at the Museum: Battle of the Smithsonian	2009	Amaze Entertainment; Pipeworks Software (PC, Wii, X360); The Fizz Factor (DS)	Majesco	Night at the Museum: Battle of the Smithsonian
A Nightmare on Elm Street	1990	Rare	LJN	A Nightmare on Elm Street franchise
No Escape	1994	Bits Corporation	Sony Imagesoft	No Escape
Oliver & Company	1989	Coktel Vision	Nathan Logiciels	Oliver & Company
Open Season	2006	Ubisoft Montreal; Ubisoft Quebec	Ubisoft	Open Season
Over the Hedge	2006	Vicarious Visions	Activision	Over the Hedge
Over the Hedge	2006	Edge Of Reality (GameCube, PS2, Xbox,); Vicarious Visions (DS, GBA); Beenox (PC)	Activision	Over the Hedge
Over the Hedge: Hammy Goes Nuts!	2006	Vicarious Visions (Game Boy Advance version); Amaze Entertainment (Nintendo DS and PSP versions)	Activision	Over the Hedge
Pacific Rim	2013	Yuke's	Yuke's	Pacific Rim
The Pagemaster	1994	Probe Software Ltd. (Genesis, SNES, Game Boy); Mammoth Micro Productions (Windows)	Fox Interactive (Genesis, SNES, Game Boy); Turner Interactive (Windows)	The Pagemaster
Pandorum	2009	Artificial Life, Inc.	Artificial Life, Inc.	Pandorum
Paul McCartney's Give My Regards to Broad Street	1985	Concept Software Ltd	Argus Press Software	Give My Regards to Broad Street
Peter Pan: The Legend of Never Land	2005	Blue 52	Sony Computer Entertainment	Peter Pan and Return to Never Land
Peter Pan: The Motion Picture Event	2003	Saffire	Atari Interactive	Peter Pan
Phantom Fighter	1988	Marionette	JP: Pony Canyon; NA: FCI	Mr. Vampire
Phineas and Ferb: Across the 2nd Dimension	2011	High Impact Games; Altron (DS); Virtual Toys (PSP)	Disney Interactive Studios; Sony Computer Entertainment (PSP)	Phineas and Ferb the Movie: Across the 2nd Dimension
Piglet's Big Game	2003	Doki Denki Studio	Gotham Games (GCN, PS2); Disney Interactive (GBA NTSC); THQ (GBA PAL)	Piglet's Big Movie
Pinocchio	1996	Virgin Interactive Entertainment (SNES, Mega Drive); NMS Software (Game Boy)	SNES: Nintendo, Capcom (Japan only); Mega Drive/Genesis: NA: THQ; PAL: Disney Interactive; Game Boy: Black Pearl Software	Pinocchio
Pirates of the Caribbean: At World's End	2007	Eurocom	Disney Interactive Studios	Pirates of the Caribbean: Dead Man's Chest and Pirates of the Caribbean: At World's End
Pirates of the Caribbean: Dead Man's Chest	2006	Griptonite Games; Amaze Entertainment	Buena Vista Games	Pirates of the Caribbean: Dead Man's Chest
Pirates of the Caribbean: The Curse of the Black Pearl	2003	Pocket Studios	Disney Interactive, TDK Mediactive	Pirates of the Caribbean: The Curse of the Black Pearl
Plan 9 from Outer Space	1992	Gremlin Graphics	Gremlin Graphics (Europe)/Konami (USA)	Plan 9 from Outer Space
Planet of the Apes	2001	Visiware (PC and PlayStation); Torus Games (Game Boy Advance and Game Boy Color)	Ubisoft	Planet of the Apes
Planet of the Apes: Last Frontier	2017	The Imaginati Studios	FOXNEXT Games; The Imaginarium; Creative England	Planet of the Apes franchise
Platoon	1987	Ocean Software	Data East, Sunsoft (NES)	Platoon
Platoon	2002	Digital Reality	Monte Cristo; Strategy First	Platoon
The Polar Express	2004	Blue Tongue Entertainment	THQ	The Polar Express
Poltergeist	1982	Tandy	Tandy; SLM Entertainment; Metro-Goldwyn-Mayer	Poltergeist
Porky's	1983		20th Century Fox; Romox (Atari 8-bit)	Porky's
Predator	1987	Software Studios; System 3 Pack-In-Video (NES); Klon (MSX); Source; GlenHills Graphics	Activision; Superior Software; The Hit Squad; Pack-In-Video	Predator
Predator 2	1990	Oxford Mobius; Arc Developments	Image Works; Konami; Mirrorsoft	Predator 2
Predator 2	1992	Teeny Weeny Games; Krisalis Software; Acclaim Grey Team; Perfect 10 Productions	Acclaim Entertainment (Note: Released under the Arena Entertainment brand name.)	Predator 2
The Punisher	2005	Volition; Amplified Games (mobile)	THQ	The Punisher
Puppet Master: The Game	2023	October Games	Full Moon Features, October Games	Puppet Master franchise
Puss in Boots	2011	Blitz Games (Xbox 360, PS3, Wii); ImaginEngine (DS)	THQ	Puss in Boots
Quest for Camelot	1998	Titus Interactive	Titus Interactive; Nintendo	Quest for Camelot
R.I.P.D. The Game	2013	Saber Interactive	Atlus USA	R.I.P.D.
Raiders of the Lost Ark	1982	Atari, Inc.	Atari, Inc.	Raiders of the Lost Ark
Rambo	1985	Platinum Productions	Ocean Software	Rambo: First Blood Part II
Rambo: First Blood Part II	1986	Sega	Sega	Rambo: First Blood Part II
Rambo	1987	Pack-In-Video	Acclaim	Rambo: First Blood Part II
Rambo III	1988	Ocean Software, Sega, Taito	Ocean/Taito, Sega	Rambo III
Rango	2011	Behaviour Interactive	Electronic Arts; Paramount Digital Entertainment	Rango
Ra.One – The Game	2011	Sony Computer Entertainment	Red Chillies Entertainment	Ra.One
Ratatouille	2007	Asobo Studio (PS2, Wii, GCN, Xbox, PC, OS X); Heavy Iron Studios (PS3, X360); Helixe (GBA, NDS); Locomotive Games (PSP); Universomo (mobile, J2ME)	THQ	Ratatouille
Ratatouille: Food Frenzy	2007	Helixe	THQ	Ratatouille
Ratchet & Clank	2016	Insomniac Games	Sony Computer Entertainment	Ratchet & Clank
Real Steel	2011	Yuke's Media Creations	Yuke's Media Creations	Real Steel
Reign of Fire	2002	Kuju Entertainment; Crawfish Interactive (GBA)	BAM! Entertainment	Reign of Fire
Reservoir Dogs	2006	Volatile Games	Eidos Interactive	Reservoir Dogs
Return of the Jedi: Death Star Battle	1983	Parker Brothers	Parker Brothers; Sinclair Research	Return of the Jedi
Rio	2011	Eurocom	THQ	Rio
Rise of the Guardians: The Video Game	2012	Torus Games	D3 Publisher	Rise of the Guardians
Ro(c)k Podvraťáků	2006	Centauri Production		Ro(c)k podvraťáků
Robin Hood: Prince of Thieves	1991	Sculptured Software, Bits Studios	Virgin Games	Robin Hood: Prince of Thieves
RoboCop	1988	Data East: Ocean Software (Others) Quicksilver Software (Apple II) AGC (CPC) Sakata SAS (NES) Tandy Corporation (TRS-80 CoCo)	Data East Corporation: Data East (Arcade, MS-DOS, NES, Apple II) Ocean Software (Amiga, Atari ST, C64, CPC, ZX Spectrum) Erbe Software (MS-DOS, MSX) Tandy Corporation (TRS-80 CoCo) Game Boy; NA/EU: Ocean Software; JP: Epic/Sony Records	RoboCop
RoboCop 2	1990	Special FX (Amiga/Atari ST); Ocean Software (Game Boy/NES)	Ocean Software (Amiga/Atari ST)	RoboCop 2
RoboCop 3	1992	Digital Image Design (Amiga)	Flying Edge (Genesis); Ocean Software (Amiga)	RoboCop 3
RoboCop	2001		Titus Software	RoboCop
RoboCop	2003	Titus Interactive Studio	Titus Software Corporation	RoboCop
RoboCop	2004	Digital Bridges		RoboCop
RoboCop	2014	Glu Mobile	Glu Mobile	RoboCop (2014)
RoboCop: Rogue City	2023	Teyon	Nacon	RoboCop
Robots	2005	Eurocom (console); Griptonite Games (GBA and NDS)	Vivendi Universal Games (Note: Released under the Sierra Entertainment brand name in all regions except Japan)	Robots
The Rocketeer	1991	Ironwind Software	Bandai	The Rocketeer
Rocky Balboa	2007	Ubisoft Montreal	Ubisoft	Rocky Balboa
Rocky Super Action Boxing	1983	Coleco	Coleco	Rocky III
The Room	2010	Newgrounds	Newgrounds	The Room
Rudolph the Red-Nosed Reindeer	2010	High Voltage Software; DreamWorks Classics Glyphic Entertainment	Red Wagon Games	Rudolph the Red-Nosed Reindeer
Rugrats in Paris: The Movie	2000	Avalanche Software (PS1 & N64); Software Creations (GBC); KnowWonder (PC)	THQ; Mattel Interactive (PC)	Rugrats in Paris: The Movie
The Rugrats Movie	1998	Software Creations	THQ	The Rugrats Movie
Saw	2009	Zombie Studios	Konami	Saw film franchise
Saw II: Flesh & Blood	2010	Zombie Studios	Konami	Saw film franchise
Scan Command: Jurassic Park	2001	Knowledge Adventure	Knowledge Adventure	Jurassic Park III
Scarface	2012	Fuse Powered Inc.		Scarface
Scarface: Money. Power. Respect.	2006	FarSight Studios	Vivendi Games (Note: Released under the Sierra Entertainment brand name)	Scarface
Scarface: The World Is Yours	2006	Radical Entertainment	Vivendi Games (Note: Released under the Sierra Entertainment brand name)	Scarface
The Scorpion King: Sword of Osiris	2002	WayForward Technologies	Universal Interactive	The Scorpion King
The Scorpion King: Rise of the Akkadian	2002	Point of View, Inc.	Universal Interactive	The Scorpion King
Scott Pilgrim vs. the World: The Game	2010	Ubisoft Montreal (PSN and XBLA); Ubisoft Chengdu; Ubisoft Pune Production Studio (Wallace and Online Multiplayer DLC)	Ubisoft	Scott Pilgrim vs. the World
SD Shin Kamen Rider Rumble	2023	Bandai Namco Entertainment	Bandai Namco Entertainment	Shin Kamen Rider
Seven Samurai 20XX	2004	Dimps; Polygon Magic	Sammy	Seven Samurai'
The Shadow	1994	Ocean Software	Ocean Software	The Shadow
Shark Tale	2004	Edge of Reality (console); KnowWonder (PC); Vicarious Visions (GBA)	Activision; Taito (JP; GC, PS2, GBA)	Shark Tale
Sharknado: The Video Game	2014	Other Ocean Interactive	Majesco	Sharknado 2: The Second One
Short Circuit	1987	Ocean Software		Short Circuit
Shrek	2001	Digital Illusions CE	TDK Mediactive	Shrek
Shrek: Fairy Tale Freakdown	2001	Prolific	TDK Mediactive	Shrek
Shrek: Hassle at the Castle	2002	Tose Co., Ltd.	TDK Mediactive	Shrek
Shrek: Treasure Hunt	2002	The Code Monkeys	TDK Mediactive	Shrek
Shrek Super Party	2002	Mass Media	TDK Mediactive	Shrek
Shrek 2	2004	Luxoflux (cross-platforming); KnowWonder (original PC); Beenox (cross-platforming porting for PC); Aspyr (original PC porting for Mac); Vicarious Visions (GBA); Skyworks Interactive (mobile)	Activision	Shrek 2
Shrek SuperSlam	2005	Shaba Games (PS2, GameCube, Xbox) LTI Gray Matter (Windows) Amaze (GBA/DS)	Activision	Shrek
Shrek Forever After	2010	PC, PS3, X360, Wii; XPEC Entertainment; Nintendo DS; Griptonite iOS; Gameloft	Activision	Shrek Forever After
Shrek the Third	2007	7 Studios, Shaba Games (Xbox 360, PC); Amaze Entertainment (Wii, PS2, PSP); Vicarious Visions (Nintendo DS, GBA); Gameloft (mobile)	Activision	Shrek the Third
Shrek: Ogres & Dronkeys	2007	WayForward Technologies	Activision	Shrek
The Sky Crawlers: Innocent Aces	2008	Project Aces; Access Games	JP: Namco Bandai; NA: Xseed Games; EU: Namco Bandai	The Sky Crawlers
Small Soldiers	1998	DreamWorks Interactive; Tiertex Design Studios (GB)	Electronic Arts; THQ (GB)	Small Soldiers
The Smurfs	2011	Magic Pockets	Ubisoft	The Smurfs
A Sound of Thunder	2004	Möbius Entertainment	BAM! Entertainment	A Sound of Thunder
Space Chimps	2008	Redtribe (PlayStation 2, Wii and Xbox 360); Wicked Witch Software (Microsoft Windows port); WayForward Technologies (Nintendo DS)	Brash Entertainment	Space Chimps
Space Jam	1996	Sculptured Software	Acclaim Entertainment	Space Jam
Space Jam: A New Legacy	2021	Digital Eclipse	Digital Eclipse	Space Jam: A New Legacy
Speed Racer: The Videogame	2008	Sidhe Interactive; Virtuos (Nintendo DS); Glu Mobile (Mobile)	Warner Bros. Games; Glu Mobile (Mobile)	Speed Racer
Spider-Man	2002	Treyarch (Note: Ported to Microsoft Windows by Gray Matter Studios.); Digital Eclipse (GBA)	Activision	Spider-Man
Spider-Man 2	2004	Treyarch (PS2/Xbox/GameCube); Digital Eclipse (GBA/NGE); The Fizz Factor (PC); Aspyr (MAC); Vicarious Visions (DS/PSP)	Activision	Spider-Man 2
Spider-Man 3	2007	Treyarch (Note: Ported to Microsoft Windows by Beenox.); Vicarious Visions (GBA/DS/PS2/Wii/PSP)	Activision	Spider-Man 3
The Spiderwick Chronicles	2008	Stormfront Studios	Vivendi Games (Note: Released under the Sierra Entertainment brand name)	The Spiderwick Chronicles
SpongeBob HeroPants	2015	Behaviour Interactive	Activision	The SpongeBob Movie: Sponge Out of Water
The SpongeBob SquarePants Movie	2004	Heavy Iron Studios (PS2, GC, Xbox, PS3); AWE Games (Microsoft Windows); WayForward Technologies (GBA); Aspyr (Mac)	THQ	The SpongeBob SquarePants Movie
The Spy Who Loved Me	1990	The Kremlin	Domark	The Spy Who Loved Me
Star Trek Generations: Beyond the Nexus	1994	Absolute Entertainment	Absolute Entertainment	Star Trek Generations
Star Trek DAC	2009	Naked Sky Entertainment, Bad Robot Interactive	Paramount Digital Entertainment	Star Trek (2009)
Star Trek Generations	1997	MicroProse	MicroProse	Star Trek Generations
Star Trek: Hidden Evil	1999	Presto Studios	NA: Activision; EU: Empire Interactive	Star Trek: Insurrection
Star Trek: Phaser Strike	1979	Milton Bradley	Milton Bradley	Star Trek: The Motion Picture
Star Wars	1983	Atari, Inc.	Atari, Inc.	Star Wars (1977)
Star Wars	1987	Namco	Namco	Star Wars (1977)
Star Wars	1991	Lucasfilm Games, Beam Software; NMS Software (GB); Tiertex (GG/MS)	JP: Victor Musical Industries; NA: JVC Musical Industries; NA: Capcom (GB); NA: Nintendo (GB Players Choice); NA/EU: U.S. Gold (GG/MS); EU: Lucasfilm Games; EU: Ubisoft (GB); EU: Kixx (MS); SA: Tec Toy	Star Wars (1977)
Star Wars: The Empire Strikes Back	1982	Parker Brothers	Parker Brothers	The Empire Strikes Back
Star Wars: The Empire Strikes Backk	1985	Atari Games	Atari Games	The Empire Strikes Back
Star Wars: The Empire Strikes Back	1992	Lucasfilm Games; Sculptured Software	JVC	The Empire Strikes Back
Star Wars: Episode I – The Phantom Menace	1999	Big Ape Productions	LucasArts	Star Wars: Episode I – The Phantom Menace
Star Wars: Episode II – Attack of the Clones	2002	David A. Palmer Productions	THQ	Star Wars: Episode II – Attack of the Clones
Star Wars: Episode III – Revenge of the Sith	2005	The Collective; LucasArts; Ubisoft Montreal (GBA & DS versions)	LucasArts; Ubisoft (GBA & DS versions)	Star Wars: Episode III – Revenge of the Sith
Star Wars: Return of the Jedi	1984	Atari, Inc.	Atari; Domark	Return of the Jedi
Stargate	1994	Probe Entertainment	Acclaim Entertainment	Stargate
Stargate	1995	Probe Entertainment (Genesis); Tantalus Interactive (Super NES)	Acclaim Entertainment	Stargate
Starship Troopers	1997	Strangelite	Empire Interactive and Destineer	Starship Troopers
Starship Troopers: Terran Ascendancy	2000	Blue Tongue Entertainment	Hasbro Interactive	Starship Troopers
Street Fighter: The Movie	1995	Incredible Technologies	Capcom	Street Fighter
Street Fighter: The Movie	1995	Capcom	Capcom (Japan); Acclaim Entertainment (International)	Street Fighter
The Sum of All Fears	2002	Red Storm Entertainment	Ubi Soft	The Sum of All Fears
Super Star Wars	1992	Sculptured Software; LucasArts; Code Mystics (PS4/Vita)	JVC; Nintendo (US Version 1.1); LucasArts (Virtual Console); Disney Interactive Studios (PS4/PS Vita); Nintendo Australia	Star Wars (1977)
Super Star Wars: Return of the Jedi	1994	Sculptured Software (SNES); Realtime Associates (GB/GG)	NA: JVC, later re-released by THQ (SNES); JP/EU: JVC (SNES); NA/EU: Black Pearl Software (GB/GG)	Return of the Jedi
Super Star Wars: The Empire Strikes Back	1993	Sculptured Software; LucasArts	JVC, later re-released by THQ (SNES); LucasArts (Virtual Console)	The Empire Strikes Back
Superman Returns	2006	EA Tiburon	Electronic Arts	Superman Returns
Superman Returns: Fortress of Solitude	2006	Santa Cruz Games/EA Tiburon	Electronic Arts	Superman Returns
Surf's Up	2007	Ubisoft Montreal / Ubisoft Quebec / Totally Games (PS2) (uncredited)	Ubisoft; Sony Computer Entertainment America (PS2, PS3, and PSP)	Surf's Up
Sweet Home	1989	Capcom	Capcom	Sweet Home
Tangled: The Video Game	2010	Disney Interactive Studios	Disney Interactive Studios	Tangled
Tasmania Story	1990		NA: FCI; JP: Pony Canyon	Tasmania Story
The Terminator	1990	Bethesda Softworks	Bethesda Softworks	The Terminator
The Terminator	1993	Gray Matter, Mindscape	Mindscape	The Terminator
Terminator 2: Judgment Day	1991	Midway (arcade); Probe Software (ports); Beam Software (Game Boy version)	Midway (Arcade); Acclaim Entertainment (Note: Released under the Arena Entertainment brand name on Sega systems and the LJN brand name on Nintendo systems.) (Home Ports)	Terminator 2: Judgment Day
Terminator 3: Rise of the Machines	2003	Black Ops Entertainment (Note: Additional work by Shiny Entertainment and Legend Entertainment.); Taniko (GBA)	Atari	Terminator 3: Rise of the Machines
Terminator Salvation	2009	Grin	Equity Games; Evolved Games	Terminator Salvation
The Texas Chainsaw Massacre	1983		Wizard Video	The Texas Chain Saw Massacre
The Thing	2002	Computer Artworks	Black Label Games; Konami	The Thing
Thor: God of Thunder	2011	Liquid Entertainment (PS3, Xbox 360); Red Fly Studios (Wii, Nintendo 3DS); WayForward Technologies (Nintendo DS)	Sega	Thor
Timecop	1995	Cryo Interactive	Victor Entertainment; JVC Musical Industries	Timecop
TMNT	2007	Ubisoft Montreal	Ubisoft	TMNT
TMNT	2007	Ubisoft Montreal	Ubisoft; Game Factory Interactive; Russobit-M	TMNT
Toki no Tabibito: Time Stranger	1986	Kemco		Toki no Tabibito: Time Stranger
Tomorrow Never Dies	1999	Black Ops Entertainment	Electronic Arts; MGM Interactive	Tomorrow Never Dies
Top Gun	1986	Ocean Software		Top Gun
Top Gun	1987	Konami		Top Gun
Top Gun: The Second Mission	1989	Konami		Top Gun
Top Gun: Danger Zone	1991	Distinctive Software	Konami	Top Gun
Top Gun: Fire At Will	1996	Spectrum Holobyte	Spectrum Holobyte	Top Gun
Top Gun: Guts and Glory	1993	Distinctive Software	NA: Konami; EU: Konami	Top Gun
Top Gun: Hornet's Nest	1998	Spectrum Holobyte and Zipper Interactive		Top Gun
Top Gun: Firestorm	2001	Fluid Studios	Titus Interactive	Top Gun
Top Gun: Combat Zones	2001	Digital Integration	Titus Interactive	Top Gun
Top Gun	2006	Interactive Vision	Mastiff Inc in North America, and Taito in Japan	Top Gun
Top Gun	2007	Atomic Planet Entertainment	Blast! Entertainment Ltd	Top Gun
Top Gun	2010	Doublesix	Paramount Digital Entertainment	Top Gun
Top Gun: Hard Lock	2012	505 Games and Paramount Interactive		Top Gun
Total Recall	1990	Ocean Software, Interplay Entertainment	Ocean Software, Acclaim Entertainment	Total Recall
Towering Inferno	1982	U.S. Games	U.S. Games	The Towering Inferno
Toy Story	1995	Traveller's Tales; Tiertex Design Studios (Game Boy)	Disney Interactive; Sega (Genesis, EU); Black Pearl Software (Game Boy)	Toy Story
Toy Story 2: Buzz Lightyear to the Rescue	1999	Traveller's Tales; Tiertex Design Studios (GBC)	Activision; Disney Interactive (PC); THQ (GBC)	Toy Story 2
Toy Story 3: The Video Game	2010	Avalanche Software (PS3, Wii, Xbox 360, Mac OS X, PC); Asobo Studio (PS2, PSP); Disney Interactive Studios n-Space (DS)	Disney Interactive Studios	Toy Story 3
Toy Story Racer	2001	Traveller's Tales; Tiertex Design Studios (Game Boy Color)	Activision	Toy Story franchise
Toys	1993	Imagineering, Inc.	Absolute Entertainment	Toys
Transformers Autobots	2007	Vicarious Visions	Activision	Transformers
Transformers Decepticons	2007	Vicarious Visions	Activision	Transformers
Transformers Revenge of the Fallen: Autobots	2009	Vicarious Visions	Activision	Transformers: Revenge of the Fallen
Transformers Revenge of the Fallen: Decepticons	2009	Vicarious Visions	Activision; DreamWorks Pictures; Paramount Pictures; Hasbro	Transformers: Revenge of the Fallen
Transformers: Dark of the Moon	2011	High Moon Studios (Note: Behaviour Interactive developed the game for the Wii, Nintendo 3DS and Nintendo DS, EA Mobile developed the game for the mobile version.)	Activision (Note: The game was published for the mobile version by EA Mobile.)	Transformers: Dark of the Moon
Transformers: Revenge of the Fallen	2009	Luxoflux (Note: Beenox developed the game for Microsoft Windows, Krome Studios developed the game for the PlayStation 2 and Wii, Vicarious Visions developed the game for the Nintendo DS, and Savage Entertainment developed the game for the PlayStation Portable.)	Activision	Transformers: Revenge of the Fallen
Transformers: The Game	2007	Traveller's Tales; Nintendo DS; Vicarious Visions; PlayStation Portable; Savage Entertainment	Activision	Transformers
Treasure Planet: Battle at Procyon	2002	Barking Dog Studios	Disney Interactive	Treasure Planet
Tron	1982	Bally Midway; ENCOM International		Tron
Tron: Evolution	2010	Propaganda Games; GameStar Ltd. (PC); SuperVillain Studios (PSP)	Disney Interactive Studios	Tron: Legacy
Tron RUN/r	2016	Sanzaru Games	Disney Interactive Studios	Tron franchise
True Lies	1994	Beam Software	Acclaim Entertainment (Note: Released under the LJN brand name on Nintendo systems.)	True Lies
Tunnel Rats: 1968	2009	Replay Studios	Boll AG	Tunnel Rats
Underworld: The Eternal War	2004	Lucky Chicken Games	Play It!	Underworld
The Untouchables	1989	Ocean Software	Ocean Software	The Untouchables
Up	2009	Asobo Studio (PS2, PSP, PC); Heavy Iron Studios (PS3, Xbox 360, Wii); Altron (NDS); THQ (iOS, mobile)	THQ	Up
Uuno Turhapuro muuttaa maalle	1986	Pasi Hytönen	Amersoft	Uuno Turhapuro muuttaa maalle
Vampire Hunter D	1999	Victor Interactive Software	Victor Interactive Software; Jaleco	Vampire Hunter D
Van Helsing	2004	Saffire	Vivendi Universal Games (Note: Released in PAL regions under the Sierra Entertainment brand name)	Van Helsing
A View to a Kill	1985	Domark; Angelsoft	Domark; Mindscape	A View to a Kill
Virus: It is Aware	1999	Cryo Interactive	Cryo Interactive	Virus
WALL-E	2008	Heavy Iron Studios (PS3, Xbox 360, Wii); Asobo Studio (PC, Mac, PS2, PSP); Helixe (DS); Savage Entertainment (PSP); Universomo (J2ME)	THQ	WALL-E
Wallace & Gromit: The Curse of the Were-Rabbit	2005	Frontier Developments	Konami	Wallace & Gromit: The Curse of the Were-Rabbit
Wanted: Weapons of Fate	2009	Grin	Warner Bros. Interactive Entertainment	Wanted
WarGames	1984	Coleco		WarGames
WarGames: Defcon 1	1998	Interactive Studios	MGM Interactive: EU: Electronic Arts	WarGames
Warlock	1995	Realtime Associates	Acclaim Entertainment (Note: Released under the LJN brand name on the SNES.)	Warlock film series
The Warriors	2005	Rockstar Toronto (Note: Ported to PlayStation Portable by Rockstar Leeds.)	Rockstar Games	The Warriors
The Warriors: Street Brawl	2009	CXTM	Paramount Digital Entertainment	The Warriors
Watchmen: The End Is Nigh	2009	Deadline Games	Warner Bros. Interactive Entertainment	Watchmen
Waterworld	1995	Ocean of America (VB, SS); DMA Design (SNES); Data Design Interactive (MD); PAM Development (GB); Intelligent Games (PC)	Ocean Software (VB, SNES, GB); Interplay Productions (PC)	Waterworld
Wayne's World	1993	Gray Matter Inc. (SNES, Mega Drive/Genesis); Radical Entertainment (Game Boy, NES)	Toy Headquarters	Wayne's World
We're Back! A Dinosaur's Story	1993	Hi-Tech Expressions (SNES, Game Boy, Mega Drive/Genesis)	Visual Concepts	We're Back! A Dinosaur's Story
Where the Wild Things Are	2009	Griptonite Games (PS3, Wii, X360); WayForward Technologies (DS)	Warner Bros. Interactive Entertainment	Where the Wild Things Are
White Men Can't Jump	1995	High Voltage Software; Trimark Interactive	Atari Corporation	White Men Can't Jump
Who Framed Roger Rabbit	1988	Buena Vista Software	Buena Vista Software	Who Framed Roger Rabbit
Who Framed Roger Rabbit	1989	Rare	LJN	Who Framed Roger Rabbit
Who Framed Roger Rabbit	1991	Capcom	Capcom	Who Framed Roger Rabbit
Wild Wild West: The Steel Assassin	1999	SouthPeak Interactive	SouthPeak Interactive	Wild Wild West
Willow	1988	Brian A. Rice Inc	Mindscape	Willow
Willow	1989	Capcom	Capcom	Willow
Willow	1989	Capcom	Capcom	Willow
The Wizard of Oz	1993	Manley & Associates	SETA Corporation	The Wizard of Oz
The World Is Not Enough	2000	Eurocom	EA Games	The World Is Not Enough
The World Is Not Enough	2000	Black Ops Entertainment	EA Games	The World Is Not Enough
The World of Cars Online	2008	Disney Interactive Studios	The Walt Disney Company	Cars film series
X2: Wolverine's Revenge	2003	GenePool Software (GameCube, PlayStation 2 & Xbox); Vicarious Visions (GBA); LTI Gray Matter (PC & Mac)	Activision; Aspyr (Mac version)	X2
X-Men: The Official Game	2006	Z-Axis (PS2 / Xbox / Xbox 360); Hypnos (GameCube port); Beenox (Microsoft Windows port); WayForward Technologies (GBA); Amaze Entertainment (Nintendo DS)	Activision; Capcom U.S.A., Inc. (GBA re-release)	X2 and X-Men: The Last Stand
X-Men Origins: Wolverine	2009	Raven Software	Activision	X-Men Origins: Wolverine
Young Sherlock: The Legacy of Doyle	1987	Pack-In-Video	Pack-In-Video	Young Sherlock Holmes
Zombieland: Double Tap – Road Trip	2019	High Voltage Software	GameMill Entertainment (North America); Maximum Games (Europe)	Zombieland franchise
Zombieland: Headshot Fever	2021	XR Games	XR Games	Zombieland franchise
John Wick	TBA	Saber Interactive	Saber Interactive	John Wick

== See also ==
- List of video games based on comics
- List of video games based on cartoons
- List of video games based on anime or manga
