= Scarface =

Scarface may refer to:

== Arts and entertainment ==
- Scarface (novel), a novel by Armitage Trail
  - Scarface (1932 film), a film starring Paul Muni
  - Scarface (1983 film), a remake starring Al Pacino
    - Scarface (soundtrack), a soundtrack for the 1983 film
      - "Scarface (Push It to the Limit)", a 1983 song from the Scarface soundtrack
    - Tony Montana, the protagonist of Scarface (1983) and Scarface: The World Is Yours, nicknamed "Scarface"
    - Scarface: Money. Power. Respect., a 2006 PlayStation Portable game
    - Scarface: The World Is Yours, a 2006 video game
    - Scarface (iOS game), a 2012 role-playing iOS game
- Scarface (comics) or Ventriloquist, an enemy of Batman
- Scarface (Kinnikuman), a character in Kinnikuman Nisei
- Scarface Claw, a fictional tom cat in Hairy Maclary children's stories
- Scarface, a character in The Animals of Farthing Wood
- Scarface, a character in Mega Man X: Command Mission
- Scarface, a character in Predator: Concrete Jungle
- Scarface or Vy Low, a character in Shadow Skill
- Scarface, a character in Smash TV
- Scarface One, a character in Ace Combat 2

== People ==
- Scarface, nickname for Al Capone (1899–1947), an American gangster and a businessman.
- Scarface (rapper) (born 1970), American, member of the Geto Boys
- Scarface Charley (1851–1896), chief of the Modoc Native American tribe
- Scarface, nickname of José Aldo (born 1986), Brazilian mixed martial artist

== Other uses ==
- Scarface (lion)
- Scarface gang, a Belgian criminal gang responsible for armed robberies

== See also ==
- Lady Scarface, a 1941 American crime drama film directed by Frank Woodruff
- Captain Scarface, a 1953 American thriller film directed by Paul Guilfoyle
- The Scarface Mob, a 1959 American film noir crime film directed by Phil Karlson
- Scarface Nation, a 2008 book on the 1983 film Scarface
- Skarface, a French ska band active in the 1990s
