= Chris Tilton =

American soundtrack composer

- Occupation: Soundtrack composer
- Website: christilton.com

Chris Tilton is an American soundtrack composer and has helped compose several television, film and video game scores. He has collaborated with Michael Giacchino and J. J. Abrams on several of his projects. His projects include the video games Mercenaries: Playground of Destruction, Black, Fracture, SimCity, Assassin's Creed Unity, and the television series Zoo and Fringe from season 2 to season 5. He also collaborated with Giacchino and Andrea Datzman for J. J. Abrams' series Undercovers,. He also composed the score for the serie "From"

== Video games ==
Year	Title	Studio(s)	Notes
2002	Pac-Man Fever	Mass Media Inc.	Composed with Jim Ardon
2003	Muppets Party Cruise	Mass Media Inc.	—N/a
2004	Alias	Acclaim Entertainment	Composed with Michael Giacchino
2005	Mercenaries: Playground of Destruction	Pandemic Studios; LucasArts	Composed with Michael Giacchino
2005	The Incredibles: Rise of the Underminer	Heavy Iron Studios; THQ	Composed with Michael Giacchino
2006	Black	Criterion Games; Electronic Arts	Composed with Michael Giacchino
2008	Jumper: Griffin's Story	Redtribe; Brash Entertainment	—N/a
2008	Mercenaries 2: World in Flames	Pandemic Studios; Electronic Arts	—N/a
2008	Fracture	Day 1 Studios; LucasArts	Composed with Chad Seiter
2009	Night at the Museum: Battle of the Smithsonian	Amaze Entertainment; Majesco	—N/a
2013	SimCity	Maxis Emeryville; Electronic Arts	—N/a
2014	SimCity: BuildIt	TrackTwenty; Electronic Arts	—N/a
2014	Assassin's Creed Unity	Ubisoft Montreal; Ubisoft	Composed with Sarah Schachner and Ryan Amon
2017	Divide	Exploding Tuba Studios	—N/a
2023	Assassin's Creed Nexus VR	Red Storm Entertainment	
