= Antz (video game) =

1999 video game

- Developer: Planet Interactive
- Publisher: Infogrames
- Programmer: Eric Zmiro
- Artist: Philippe Dessoly
- Platform: Game Boy Color
- Release: EU: September 1999; NA: September 28, 1999
- Genre: Platform
- Modes: Single-player, multiplayer

Antz is a video game developed by French studio Planet Interactive and released in 1999 by Infogrames for the Game Boy Color. It is based on the film of the same name.

== Development ==
The game was developed by Planet Interactive, a company founded in 1999.

== Reception ==
Reception

Aggregate score
Aggregator	Score
GameRankings	60%

Review scores
Publication	Score
AllGame	2.5/5
GameSpot	6.9/10
IGN	5/10
News & Record	C+

The game received "mixed" reviews according to the review aggregation website GameRankings.

Lauren Fielder, writing for GameSpot, concluded that "Antz on the GBC is another platform game that will amuse those who find the genre enjoyable in small scale 8-bit." IGN said, "This game is perfect for kids -- and I'm sure this game was aimed for that market: parents head to the store, see a name they recognize (Antz), pick up the game and give it to their Game Boy-playing child. The kid likes the game because it's easy to control and play. My problem is this: Antz really wasn't a kids' movie -- it was a Woody Allen flick. Hey, maybe they should make a game based on Sleeper or, better yet, Everything You Always Wanted to Know About Sex* (*But Were Afraid to Ask). Antz isn't terrible, but it won't bowl you over with originality." AllGame said, "Overall, this is really a middle-of-the-road game. Not bad, but not great either. It's worth a rental or a bargain bin purchase."

The game sold more than 250,000 copies worldwide.

== See also ==
- List of video games based on films
