= Fracture (video game) =

2008 video game

- Developer: Day 1 Studios
- Publisher: LucasArts
- Producer: Dan Hay
- Designers: Jeffrey Gregg; Tim Ryan
- Programmers: Gabriel Bott; Nathan Heazlett
- Artist: Dan Hay
- Composers: Chad Seiter; Chris Tilton
- Platforms: PlayStation 3 Xbox 360
- Release: NA: October 7, 2008; EU: October 10, 2008; AU: October 15, 2008
- Genre: Third-person shooter
- Modes: Single-player, multiplayer

Fracture is a third-person shooter video game developed by Day 1 Studios and was published by LucasArts. It was released for the PlayStation 3 and Xbox 360 in October 2008. Set in the 22nd century, the story involves two factions, Pacific and Atlantic, fighting in a xenophobic America split by global warming. The player assumes control of Jet Brody, an Atlantic Sergeant ordered to capture Pacifican Commander Sheridan. The game is notable for its focus on terrain movement through the use of futuristic weapons. Fracture garnered mixed reviews upon release.

== Story ==
Set in the year 2161, Fracture tells the tale of a xenophobic United States which has been split into two sides, the Pacific and the Atlantic, by rising water levels caused by global warming. The Atlantic is devoted to advancing the technological prowess of humanity, while the Pacific is devoted to enhancing the human genome. When the xenophobia reaches an unfortunate peak, war erupts, and an army from the Atlantic is dispatched to deal with the Pacific force. Players control Sergeant Jet Brody as he leads his attack team against the Pacific force. His first target is Alcatraz Island, where Brody is able to test all the Pacific's found weapons. Both the Atlantic and the Pacificans have a trade monopoly in the area to promote the sciences.

Jet Brody is ordered to capture Sheridan, the Pacifican commander, the player's team is ambushed and Sheridan escapes. During the pursuit in a dropship, the ship is shot down, and Brody is the only survivor of the crash. After evading enemies, he meets up with a squad of Atlantic soldiers. The squad infiltrates a Pacifican bunker, but most of the members are killed shortly afterward. After fighting through the bunker alone, the player discovers HYDRABALLS, a new, highly explosive Pacifican weapon. After destroying a large number of the weapons, the player breaks through and takes an elevator to a secret underground facility, where the player locates and destroys key manufacturing equipment. After destroying the equipment, the player aids an allied squad in capturing the Golden Gate Bridge from Pacifican forces and fixing another bridge using multiple spike grenades. The Golden Gate Bridge is captured, but a giant, 1,000-foot-tall (300 m) machine called Dreadnought awakes from the Bay and destroys most of the Atlantic forces, then marches towards the East Coast invincible to aerial attack.

The player is taken out of San Francisco to a remote Pacifican base in the desert, where he is supposed to find information about destroying the Dreadnought. Along the way to the communications center the player fights a new enemy, the ground-burrowing Creepers, and shuts down the base's defense systems by destroying power generators. Brody also destroys both the radar systems and their generators, therefore knocking out all Pacifican communications. At this point in the game the player is required to use the Lodestone, a vortex-creating weapon, to solve platform puzzles by creating magnetic vortices. Also introduced are the super-fast Cheetah soldiers, who can move from place to place in the blink of an eye. Next Brody encounters a creature called the Bolla, a large minotaur-like monster that throws boulders and charges the player. After killing the Bolla Brody is given an Alliance vehicle, the TDV1, that has an automatic turret and terrain deformation powers. Using the TDV1, the player is supposed to jump large pits of toxic chemicals and destroy the base's supercomputer, while fighting Pacifican soldiers and another Bolla.

At this point the base's supercomputer goes on meltdown and starts destroying the base, just as the player receives another TDV1 to escape to a landing pad. Sheridan escapes, this time with some of the toxin, and locks a traitorous biologist, named Marico, in a prison cell guarded by a Pacifican squad. The player must destroy the Pacifican forces and rescue Matsuharo before proceeding to Washington, D.C. to destroy the Dreadnought and take down Sheridan. Another boss creature, the Spike Hydra that can create personal shields, is encountered as well as another Bolla as Brody brings the defense shields back online by connecting the generator beams together. Brody breaks the Dreadnought's shields and destroys it from the inside, then kills Sheridan in a final battle to destroy the Pacifican Army.

== Gameplay ==
Fracture's unique selling point is its deformable terrain. The player has futuristic weapons, both in the form of guns and grenades which can raise or lower the terrain. This ability allows the player to create cover, jump to areas not normally reachable, and launch enemies into the air and into ceilings. Examples are the entrencher, the tectonic grenade, and the subsonic grenade. The player can collect data cells to unlock a weapons testing facility and the weapons within it. Notably, the game requires puzzle solving using terrain deformation.

== Music ==
Music for the game was co-composed by Chad Seiter and Chris Tilton. The score was produced by Michael Giacchino and conducted by Allan Wilson. It was recorded by Peter Fuchs, mixed by Steve Smith and performed by the Slovak Radio Symphony Orchestra.

== Reception ==
Reception

Aggregate score
Aggregator	Score	
Aggregator	PS3	Xbox 360
Metacritic	62/100	63/100

Review scores
Publication	Score	
Publication	PS3	Xbox 360
Destructoid	N/A	4/10
Eurogamer	N/A	4/10
Famitsu	28/40	28/40
Game Informer	7.5/10	7.5/10
GamePro	N/A	3.5/5
GameRevolution	B−	B−
GameSpot	6/10	6/10
GameSpy	3.5/5	3.5/5
GameTrailers	N/A	7.2/10
GameZone	7.5/10	N/A
Giant Bomb	2/5	2/5
IGN	5.9/10	5.9/10
Official Xbox Magazine (US)	N/A	7/10
PlayStation: The Official Magazine	3/5	N/A
The A.V. Club	C−	C−
Variety	N/A	(mixed)

Fracture received "mixed" reviews on both platforms according to the review aggregation website Metacritic. In Japan, where the game was ported and published by Activision on October 30, 2008, Famitsu gave it a score of one seven, one eight, one seven, and one six for a total of 28 out of 40.

1UP.com criticized Fracture for taking multiple features from other shooters such as Halo, Gears of War and Resistance: Fall of Man. The site described character Jet Brody as "perhaps the single most derivative character in the modern age of gaming, a direct combination of the heroes from Resistance/Mass Effect/Gears of War/Too Human. If the narrative weren't so staunchly heavy-handed, I'd put my money on Brody being a literal parody of shooter-genre character tropes." Game Informer continued this theme by ranking Brody first on its list of "the top 10 worst character names." Moving beyond the character's name, Game Informer noted that “Jet Brody is a detailed character, but ends up looking like an Unreal reject.” By contrast, 1UP.com described the Entrencher gun as "Fracture's true star." Edge gave it a score of four out of ten and said of the game, "Given that its bland combat is little enhanced by the ability to create cover, you suspect that the promises made for the technology have simply dug its own grave."
