= The Walking Dead: Onslaught =

2020 video game

- Cover art
- Developer: Survios
- Publisher: Survios
- Series: The Walking Dead
- Platforms: PlayStation 4; PlayStation 5; Windows
- Release: September 29, 2020
- Genres: Action-adventure; Horror
- Mode: Single-player

The Walking Dead: Onslaught is a 2020 action-adventure horror video game developed and published by Survios. It is based on the TV series The Walking Dead.

== Gameplay ==
The gameplay features VR mechanics and allows players to scavenge during gameplay as well as fight enemies in melee and ranged combat.

== Setting and characters ==
The story features, among others, Rick Grimes (voiced by Keith Ferguson), Daryl Dixon (voiced by Norman Reedus), Carol Peletier (voiced by Melissa McBride), Michonne Hawthorne (voiced by G. K. Bowes), Eugene Porter (voiced by Josh McDermitt), and Driver (voiced by Cathy Cavadini). The game is set in the United States, in Alexandria, Virginia, and features the Alexandria Safe Zone.

== Reception ==
The Walking Dead: Onslaught has been listed among the top downloaded PlayStation Store VR games multiple times throughout the years since its release.

== See also ==
- List of horror video games
