= Napoleon Dynamite: The Game =

2007 video game

- Developer: 7 Studios
- Publisher: Crave Entertainment
- Platforms: PlayStation Portable, Nintendo DS
- Release: October 30, 2007
- Genre: Action
- Modes: Single-player, multiplayer

Napoleon Dynamite: The Game is a video game by American developer 7 Studios based on the film Napoleon Dynamite. The game was announced on May 9, 2007, and released October 30, 2007.

== Gameplay ==
In the PlayStation Portable version of the Napoleon Dynamite game, there are 30 minigames, while the DS version has 25 minigames.

== Reception ==
Reception

Aggregate scores
Aggregator	Score
GameRankings	53% (DS); 40% (PSP)
Metacritic	45/100 (DS); 37/100 (PSP)

Review scores
Publication	Score
1Up.com	3/10
GameSpot	4.0/10
GamesRadar+	1/5
IGN	7.0/10 (DS); 4.5/10 (PSP)
PlayStation: The Official Magazine	3/10

Napoleon Dynamite: The Game received generally unfavorable reviews. On review aggregator Metacritic, it received a 45/100 and a 37/100 for the DS and PSP versions, respectively. Review aggregator GameRankings gave the DS version a 53% and the PSP version a 40%.

An initial review from IGN gave the PSP version of the game a 4.5 out of 10, but gave the DS version a 7.0, praising how closely the look and feel of the game matched that of the film. GameSpot called the game "irrelevant" and "a poor effort", calling the gameplay not "even halfway amusing" and rated it a 4.0/10. 1Up.com stated that the game "totally disregards the humor of the film" and gave it a 3/10, while GamesRadar+ gave it a 1/5, stating that it "butchered" the source material and recommending readers stay "far, far away." PlayStation: The Official Magazine gave the PSP version a 3/10, calling the experience "totally unsatisfying".

== See also ==
- List of video games based on films
- List of PlayStation Portable games
- List of Nintendo DS games
