= Alias (video game) =

2004 video game

- Developer: Acclaim Studios Cheltenham
- Publisher: Acclaim Entertainment
- Writers: J. J. Abrams; Breen Frazier
- Composers: Michael Giacchino; Chris Tilton
- Engine: RenderWare
- Platforms: PlayStation 2, Xbox, Microsoft Windows
- Release: PlayStation 2, Xbox: NA: 6 April 2004; EU: 8 April 2004; Microsoft Windows: EU: 28 May 2004; NA: 17 June 2004
- Genre: Action-adventure
- Mode: Single-player

Alias is a 2004 stealth action video game developed by Acclaim Studios Cheltenham (being the last game developed by them before their closure) and published by Acclaim Entertainment. The game is based on the television series Alias, and is set between episodes 19 and 20 of season 2. The plot was written by Breen Frazier and the game features the voices of the cast principals. The score was composed by Michael Giacchino, and adapted by Chris Tilton. It was released for PlayStation 2 and Xbox in April 2004, and for Windows in May/June.

== Plot ==
CIA agent Sydney Bristow is called in to work on her day off, as a fellow operative, Agent Jacobs, has disappeared under suspicious circumstances. His last communiqué to the CIA contained highly sensitive intelligence regarding Sydney's nemesis, Anna Espinosa, formerly a top agent for K-Directorate, now gone rogue. Anna has taken over the "Followers of Rambaldi" cult, a cabal of zealots hell-bent on bringing the visions of 15th century philosopher, physicist and prophet, Milo Rambaldi, to life. Now, Anna has teamed up with Julian Sark, a slippery and cunning gun-for-hire, along with Sydney's ex-boss, Arvin Sloane, a highly intelligent but utterly corrupt crime lord, and a man Sydney thoroughly despises.

Sydney is tasked with finding out what this trio of 'most wanted' fugitives is working on and discover exactly what "The Machine" is. She is assisted by her back-up team: Marcus Dixon, her field partner and loyal friend; Michael Vaughn, her CIA handler; and Marshall Flinkman, a socially inept technological whiz.

Starting in Agent Jacobs' last known location, a casino in Monte Carlo, Sydney locates a data disc in a dead drop. Hacking into a computer in the executive suite, she discovers that the casino hides an arms manufacturing facility in the basement. Now, Sydney has to acquire a laser prototype being tested there, sneak back into the casino to spy on a meeting between Anna and Sark, and escape from the casino grounds.

Jacobs' data leads the team to a museum in Saudi Arabia proudly displaying a mysterious set of bones found in the desert with links to Rambaldi. Sydney enters the museum to acquire the bones, but finds that Anna has the same idea at the same time, except that Anna has brought her task force. Racing against Anna's forces, Sydney must collect all of the bones before getting a trace on a feeling Anna that takes them to ruins in the desert. Here, Sydney's best efforts are thwarted by Anna's underhanded tactics which force Sydney to put friendship before professional loyalty, and incidentally, disarm a rather large nuclear warhead.

While Sydney was in the desert, Vaughn has tracked both missing agent Jacobs and a mathematician, Dr. Caplan, to an insane asylum in Romania. Breaking into the asylum, Sydney discovers that the prisoners are being used as human guinea pigs for Anna and Sark's experiments with their laser. After freeing Caplan and Jacobs, who in turn free the prisoners, Sydney initiates a daring plan to take Sark into custody and put an end to the experiments by starting a chemical reaction with the laser's components, which destroys the asylum when the reaction goes critical. The horrific truth about the experiments comes out as Caplan is debriefed back at the CIA.

Trading his intelligence for immunity, Sark tips the team off that Arvin Sloane is cutting a specific diamond for Anna in a laboratory beneath an embassy in Hong Kong. Sydney infiltrates the embassy by attending a party, gets into the cutting room and acquires the diamond. She trades it for the lives of the partygoers when Sloane appears and informs Sydney of the C-4 explosives he has placed around the embassy as insurance. Ignoring Sydney's warnings about Anna, he triggers a countdown on the bomb and Sydney and Dixon evacuate the embassy.

Tracing Anna to Rio de Janeiro, Sydney tails her to a nightclub where she is scheduled to meet with Sloan. Bugging a meeting between the two, Sydney discovers the potential of "The Machine," and its location in an underground bunker in Russia. As Anna marches off a double-crossed Sloane, the CIA operatives receive a surprise visit by the Followers of Rambaldi SWAT team. Realizing there is a mole within the agency, Vaughn attempts to stop the raid only to find that the leaks have come from the most unlikely of sources. The CIA team must regroup to draw up their final plans to stop Anna's nefarious plan.

Following a HALO parachute jump insertion, Sydney infiltrates the bunker and finds a captive Sloane. Reluctantly agreeing to an uneasy truce with him, Sydney must defeat Anna and figure out how to destroy the mighty Machine to stop ecological disaster being launched on the whole planet. As Anna's grand scheme and the bunker begin to collapse around her, Sydney has to push herself to the limit to escape with her life.

== Alias: Underground ==
Prior to the Acclaim release, ABC Television produced a downloadable episodic video game for PC and Mac entitled Alias: Underground, which was available through ABC's website. Developed by a now-defunct company named Dream Mechanics, the game was a 3D first-person stealth/action game with comparably lower production values. Each level of the game was produced as an individual episode and released on a monthly basis during the second season between September 2002 and June 2003. Some levels resembled episodes from the TV series (such as "Raid on SD-6", based on first-season episode "The Box"), while others were unique creations. For a time, players were eligible to enter a contest based upon their score in the game.

== Reception ==
Reception

Aggregate score
Aggregator	Score		
Aggregator	PC	PS2	Xbox
Metacritic	55/100	64/100	64/100

Review scores
Publication	Score		
Publication	PC	PS2	Xbox
Electronic Gaming Monthly	N/A	5/10	5/10
Game Informer	N/A	7.5/10	7.5/10
GamePro	N/A	4/5	4/5
GameSpot	5.5/10	6.3/10	6.3/10
GameSpy	N/A	2/5	2/5
GameZone	6/10	N/A	7.9/10
IGN	N/A	7.3/10	7.3/10
Official U.S. PlayStation Magazine	N/A	2.5/5	N/A
Official Xbox Magazine (US)	N/A	N/A	6.5/10
PC Gamer (US)	60%	N/A	N/A
Playboy	N/A	63%	63%
The Times	N/A	4/5	4/5

Alias received "mixed or average" reviews from critics, according to review aggregator website Metacritic.
