= Young Sherlock: The Legacy of Doyle =

1987 video game

- Developer: Pack-In-Video
- Publisher: Pack-In-Video
- Platform: MSX
- Release: 1987
- Genre: Adventure
- Mode: Single-player

Young Sherlock: The Legacy of Doyle (also referred to as Young Sherlock: Doyle no Isan) is a Japan-exclusive game for the MSX developed by Pack-In-Video and released in 1987. The game is based on the 1985 film Young Sherlock Holmes but the plot is completely different from that of the film.

== See also ==
- List of video games based on films
