= Licence to Kill (1989 video game) =

1989 video game

- Developer: Quixel
- Publisher: Domark
- Designer: John Kavanagh
- Programmer: Marcus Goodey
- Artist: Tony West
- Composer: David Whittaker
- Series: James Bond
- Platforms: Amiga, Amstrad CPC, Atari ST, BBC Micro, Commodore 64, MS-DOS, MSX, ZX Spectrum
- Release: NA: 1989
- Genre: Scrolling shooter
- Mode: Single-player

Licence to Kill is a vertically scrolling shooter based on the James Bond film of the same name, developed by Quixel and published by Domark in 1989. It was released for Amiga, Amstrad CPC, Atari ST, BBC Micro, Commodore 64, MS-DOS, MSX, and ZX Spectrum.

The game closely follows the plot of the film, consisting of six scenes in which Bond chases drug czar Sanchez who has murdered his best friend Felix Leiter's bride. The scenes within the game vary in setting and include helicopter chases, underwater diving, water-skis and behind the wheel of an 18-wheel tanker truck.

== Gameplay ==
The helicopter pursuit from the first level

Licence to Kill is a top down vertically scrolling shooter. The objective is to pursue the drug lord Sanchez through six levels in using different methods of locomotion. The right hand side of the screen contains a HUD which displays information about the current level, such as the height of the helicopter in the first level or the amount of ammunition remaining in the second level. Hostile enemies populate each level which can be killed or avoided and there are side objectives along the way such as picking up ammunition or drug caches. The player must dodge shots and environment dangers such as boats or falling rocks.

== Ports ==
Licence to Kill targeted multiple platforms initially and post-release with Mi6-HQ.com calling it "one of the widest released 007 titles ever."

Alongside the original versions was another version for BBC, coded by Lore Games who were subcontracted to Consul Technology who were in turn subcontracted to Domark. It was based largely on the graphics from the Spectrum version, but with a freshly written sprite engine, character 'AI', sound effects and status display. It featured a double buffer screen refresh mechanism to eliminate flicker, and was available in cassette tape and floppy disc versions.

Another version was being written for NES by Simon Nicol from Tengen. Christ West from Quixel inspected this version after the others had been completed and considered it finished despite missing the final level, but it went unreleased as by that point the Domark publishers felt that too much time had passed since the film's release and so the NES version would not be worth releasing.

== Reception ==
Computer Gaming World only recommended Licence to Kill "strictly for the action-oriented player", with others likely finding it a "license to bore". ACE Magazine considered it "fun while it lasts, but once you've cracked it you won't bother to come back." The Games Machine was more positive, saying Licence to Kill was designed "on a grand scale" and that it "follow[s] the film quite well, albeit with scenes simplified to shoot-'em-up and dodge games." Both Games Machine and Amiga magazine The One agreed that it was an improvement on Domark's previous three games, with The One calling it "...probably the best Bond game ever. Not only did it successfully capture the spirit of the film, it was also an enjoyable game to boot."

== See also ==
- List of video games based on films
