= Creed: Rise to Glory =

2018 video game

- Cover art
- Developer: Survios
- Publisher: Survios
- Engine: Unreal Engine 4 Unreal Engine 5
- Platforms: Microsoft Windows; Oculus Quest; PlayStation VR; PlayStation VR2
- Release: September 25, 2018
- Genre: Fighting
- Modes: Single-player, multiplayer

Creed: Rise to Glory is a virtual reality boxing video game. It was released in 2018, by Survios. The game is based on the Rocky franchise. The game is compatible with both HTC Vive and Oculus Rift for Microsoft Windows, the Oculus Quest and with the PlayStation VR for PlayStation 4. An updated version titled Creed: Rise to Glory – Championship Edition was released on April 4, 2023, for all platforms, including PlayStation VR2 on the PlayStation 5.

== Gameplay ==
=== Career ===
The Career Mode has the player train for a fight and progress through multiple fights as Rocky Balboa helps along the way.

=== Multiplayer ===
Multiplayer is included in the game in the way of PVP. Players can have a quick match or fight specific friends.

== Reception ==
Creed: Rise to Glory – Championship Edition was on the Top 10 list of most PSVR2 downloaded games in 2024, ranking on 7th place in US and 8th place in Europe.

=== Critical response ===
Reception

Aggregate scores
Aggregator	Score
GameRankings	(PC) 86.67% (PS4) 74.79%
Metacritic	(PC) 84/100 (PS4) 73/100 (PS5) 78/100

Review scores
Publication	Score
Hardcore Gamer	4.5/5
Official U.S. PlayStation Magazine	3.5/5

The game was met with positive reception upon release. GameRankings and Metacritic gave it a score of 86.67% and 84 out of 100 for the PC version, and 74.79% and 73 out of 100 for the PlayStation 4 version. Metacritic gave a 78 out of 100 for the PlayStation 5 version.
