= Monty Python's Cow Tossing =

2011 video game

- Developer: Luma Arcade
- Publisher: Zed Group
- Series: Monty Python
- Platforms: iOS, J2ME
- Release: February 3, 2011
- Genre: Strategy

Monty Python's Cow Tossing is a catapult-physics game. It was developed by South African studio Luma Arcade and released by Zed Worldwide on February 3, 2011, for Android, iOS, and J2ME. The game is similar in style to Angry Birds and Crush the Castle, and includes the premise of firing cows at Englishmen who are located in structures built of concrete, wood, and other materials. It is based on the film Monty Python and the Holy Grail "in which French militiamen hurl a heifer onto a band of English relic seekers", and to further tie-in to the movie, "funny quotes from the movie appear in bubbles over the characters".

== Critical reception ==
The game has received mixed to negative reviews, earning a Metacritic score of 41% based on 6 critic reviews.

In rare positive reviews, What's On IPhone wrote "I'm a Python fan and for a dollar, this game is cute, funny and worth the cost. Like Angry Birds, it can bit quite addicting"., and MacLife commented "While there's an inclination to state that Monty Python's Cow Tossing HD was a quick, hasty effort to capitalize on a classic comedy meme and heap additional currency into the Python coffers, this doesn't feel like the case. There's a genuinely good game at the core here -- the app itself ran well and we experienced none of the crashes that App Store reviewers are complaining about -- but there's a lot of version 1.0 bugginess to sort out. Give it a month, wait until it hits version 1.1 (or later), see what the feedback is and perhaps the $2.99 App Store price won't go towards a soda but towards a promising title laden with Monty Python goodness".

Gamezebo said "Monty Python's Cow Tossing often feels more like a game of chance than it does a game in the traditional sense", while Pocket Gamer UK wrote "Monty Python's Cow Tossing is a mediocre physics puzzle game that earns more points for style than substance". 148apps said "As a Monty Python fan, I am disappointed with the lazy and unimaginative way this game has used the classic comedy troupe's work. As an iOS gamer, I am disappointed with the obvious, blatant copycatting of Angry Birds. This is nothing more than a licensed-name cash grab, and you should avoid it at all costs", while Touch Arcade wrote "All in all, Monty Python's Cow Tossing is full of wasted potential". Gamereactor Sweden wrote "To throw cows on invading brits might seems like an excellent idea for a game. And it is. But Monty Python's Cow Tossing is unfortunately nothing more than a really bad copy of Angry Birds and total waste of what actually could have been fun", and AppGamer said " It's a wasted opportunity and doesn't do anything for the Monty Python name".

KnowYourMobile wrote "It's undeniably Python through and through, however, and as irksome as the catapult mechanics can be, it's good to see a developer attempting to evolve this current gaming fad rather than blindly recreate it. It might turn out to be an experiment that proves the style to be less effective than the one seen in Angry Birds, but if you're up for a critical accuracy challenge, Monty Python's Cow Tossing will certainly deliver it", iCulture argued "Any good game sooner or later gets imitated, even by known parties who have enough budget to invent", and Jhing Appgamer.net wrote "Overall, though, it's a wasted opportunity and doesn't do anything for the Monty Python name. I'm still hopeful that we'll see a proper game which does the series justice, but Monty Python's Cow Tossing isn't it".
