= Jumper: Griffin's Story (video game) =

2008 video game

- Developers: Redtribe (X360); Collision Studios (PS2/Wii)
- Publisher: Brash Entertainment
- Composer: Chris Tilton
- Platforms: PlayStation 2, Wii, Xbox 360
- Release: NA: February 12, 2008; EU: February 22, 2008 (PS2, X360); AU: February 22, 2008 (X360); AU: February 29, 2008 (PS2); EU: March 14, 2008 (Wii); AU: April 11, 2008 (Wii)
- Genre: Action-adventure
- Mode: Single-player

Jumper: Griffin's Story is an action-adventure game based on the film of the same name. It was released in 2008 by Brash Entertainment for the PlayStation 2, Wii and Xbox 360.

== Plot ==
The game begins with a flashback to the night a child Griffin's parents were murdered by a man and a woman.

In the present, Griffin has the ability to "jump" and is searching for Roland Cox, the head of the Paladins, a secret society of religious fanatics who are sworn to trace and kill "Jumpers". He travels to Nepal where he learns that the Paladins have long since lost the support of the monks who first trained them to sense Jump Scars, wormholes that the Jumpers leave behind when they teleport. He then finds and nearly kills Roland, but reinforcements show up, forcing Griffin to flee.

Three years later, Griffin arrives at the Colosseum, where he helps David Rice, another Jumper, fight off a group of Paladins. After the fight, Griffin interrogates a Paladin who reveals that the Paladins are heading to Tokyo. After a failed attack on his base by the Paladins, Griffin heads to Tokyo.

In Tokyo, Griffin discovers that the Paladins are stealing a machine that permits others to follow Jumpers through Jump Scars. He tries to stop them and nearly kills the man and woman who killed his parents, but fails and the Paladins escape with the machine.

While nursing his wounds at his lair, the Paladins arrive using the machine to jump through one of David's past Jump Scars. After a country spanning duel, Roland escapes through a Jump Scar and leaves the man who killed Griffin's parents to deal with him.

After an intense fight in Nepal, he questions the high-ranking Paladin as to the identity of the woman who killed his parents. The Paladin laughs and says that David knows her. Griffin kills him and vows to destroy all the remaining Paladins and get revenge on the woman who killed his parents.

== Critical reception ==
Reception

Aggregate scores
Aggregator	Score		
Aggregator	PS2	Wii	Xbox 360
GameRankings	35.00%	22.63%	26.75%
Metacritic	33/100	28/100	29/100

Review scores
Publication	Score		
Publication	PS2	Wii	Xbox 360
1Up.com	N/A	N/A	D−
Game Informer	N/A	1.75/10	1.75/10
GamesRadar+	1.5/5	1.5/5	1/5
GameZone	N/A	N/A	3.5/10
IGN	3.7/10	3.9/10	4.9/10
Jeuxvideo.com	8/20	6/20	4/20
Official Xbox Magazine (UK)	N/A	N/A	2/10
Official Xbox Magazine (US)	N/A	N/A	3/10
PALGN	N/A	1/10	N/A
X-Play	N/A	N/A	1/5
USA Today	4/10	4/10	4/10

The game received "generally unfavorable reviews" on all platforms, according to the review aggregation website Metacritic.

In Game Informer's Andrew Reiner's short review, he referenced the burial site of thousands of cartridges of E.T. the Extra-Terrestrial, widely considered one of the worst games of all time, suggesting that "To all the truck drivers out there who are transporting copies of Jumper: Griffin's Story to retail, please redirect your shipments to Alamogordo, New Mexico. You'll know you are in the right location when you see thousands of E.T. cartridges moving out of the way to make room for your shipment."
