= Survios =

American game developer and software publisher

Survios, Inc
- Type: Private
- Industry: Video games
- Founded: 2013; 13 years ago
- Founders: Nathan Burba, James Iliff, Alexander Silkin, Graham Matuszewski
- Headquarters: Los Angeles, California
- Products: Games, Software
- Number of employees: 100+ (2021)
- Website: survios.com

Survios is an American virtual reality game developer and software publisher based in Los Angeles, California. The company develops virtual reality software and games, including the titles Raw Data and Sprint Vector. Survios was created by graduates from the University of Southern California's Mixed Reality Lab, where they worked together on Project Holodeck. The company has raised over $54 million in venture funding led by Shasta Ventures, Lux Capital and Metro-Goldwyn-Mayer.

== History - Origins and Holodeck ==
In March 2012, motivated by a shared vision of what VR home entertainment can and should be—active and social—University of Southern California students Nathan Burba, James Iliff, Graham Matuszewski and Alex Silkin launched Project Holodeck. Together, they built an early full-body and portable VR system and developed Wild Skies, a co-op tech demo featuring Active VR gameplay, full-body tracking, and avatar embodiment.

In 2013, the students officially founded Survios and began demoing its first virtual reality project, Zombies on the Holodeck, a noir, horde-based survival shooter demoed on a prototype Oculus Rift head-mounted display (HMD) that used a variety of tracking devices for improved immersion, including PlayStation Move controllers and Razer Hydra controllers from Sixense. The project won three Proto Awards for ‘Best Overall Experience’, ‘Most Transportive’ and ‘Best Interaction Design’. In 2014, Survios secured $4 million in funding from Shasta Ventures, Mavent Partners, World Innovation Lab, and Felicis Ventures, allowing the studio to continue developing virtual reality content and technology.

== Raw Data and Active VR ==
Survios announced its first game, Raw Data, in December 2015 for the Oculus Rift and HTC Vive. The game features a variety of weapons for players to use against hordes of robotic enemies and touted interactive environments and destructible objects. It also included full-body positional tracking, avatar embodiment, and cooperative multiplayer. Prior to release, the media praised Raw Data for its immersive gameplay experience, which TechCrunch hailed as "Perhaps the most advanced first person shooter in VR." After months of event demos and alpha tests, Survios released Raw Data on Steam Early Access for HTC Vive in July 2016. A version for Oculus Rift+Touch was added shortly thereafter with support for cross-platform co-op.

Raw Data was the first VR game to reach $1 million in sales one month after its early access release as well as the first VR game to become a #1 Top Seller on Steam across all games. In addition to its financial success, Raw Data also garnered critical acclaim.

== Expansion and Growth in VR ==
In 2016, MGM and Lux Capital joined Shasta Ventures, Danhua Capital, Shanda Holdings Felicis Ventures and Dentsu Ventures in two rounds of funding for Survios, which provided $50 million to resume development on projects and further expansion. In January 2017, the company announced Raw Data Arcade, an exclusive version of the game that was designed with arcades in mind.

Sprint Vector, the company-owned VR racing game, was announced at GDC 2017. Sprint Vector introduced Survios’ "Fluid Locomotion," which allowed players to simulate walking, running, climbing, leaping and flying at high speeds by swinging and moving their arms, providing an alternative to moving in VR beyond teleporting or blinking through environments. The game launched February 2, 2018 for PCVR and PSVR. It received high praise from critics due to its polish, content offerings, and ambitious locomotion systems.

In December 2017, Survios announced its newest game Electronauts, a music creation program, alongside Apple and the iMac Pro.

Survios officially announced at CES 2018 that it would open up its own VR arcade in Torrance, Calif. The studio also announced that it partnered with theaters and retailers to host VR Pods under the codename "Tesseract," which were designed for easy and social gameplay experiences: players can play the game as they see it, however the glass projects allow spectators to see the action as well.

In May 2019, Survios unveiled its new project for that year called Battlewake, a pirate-themed naval combat game akin to Twisted Metal where players engage in fights on the high seas. In June 2020, Square Enix, Taito, and Survios announced a brand new game set in the Bubble Bobble universe.

On October 27, 2021, the Company announced the launch of 2124 Publishing. The new publishing division intends to offer independent game developers services such as financing, live services, and platform relations. The new division will be run by TQ Jefferson. The first game to be published by 2124 will be RPG Romancelvania: BATchelor’s Curse developed by The Deep End Games. The title is scheduled for release in 2022.

== Film and television ==
In recent years, Survios established itself as a home for licensed VR games and experiences, starting in March 2018 when the studio secured the license for MGM's Creed film, a spin-off of the Rocky franchise. Creed: Rise to Glory is a VR boxing game that allows players to box as titular character Adonis Creed and his journey to become a world champion fighter.

Survios announced in May 2019 that it secured the license to "AMC’s The Walking Dead". The partnership between Survios and AMC resulted in The Walking Dead: Onslaught, a VR game set in the universe of the TV Show starring Norman Reedus as Daryl Dixon.

The company also developed a VR experience for HBO’s highly successful Westworld TV series. Westworld: Awakening, a five-chapter arc set during the show’s second season, uses themes and beats from the show to immerse players further into its universe using VR technology. Survios later released the game in the same year on August 20, 2019 for Viveport and SteamVR.

== Crossing Realities: Cross-Platform, Cross-Reality Play ==
After developing virtual reality games and experiences, Survios began exploring ways to expand their games to a wider swath of players around the world. The initiative began first with the announcement of Big Rumble Boxing: Creed Champions, a boxing game set in the Creed and Rocky franchise, playable on traditional consoles and platforms outside of VR, including Nintendo Switch, PlayStation 4, Xbox One, and PC.

In October 2020, the company raised $16.7 million to continue development on virtual reality and cross-reality-based experiences. This third round of funding included and was led by Irongrey, Woori Technology, KNET Venture Fund, Seoul Investment Partners, Shasta Ventures, Lux Capital, and Samsung Next.

== Games ==
Title	Release date	Platform(s)	Notes	Ref.
Raw Data	Jun 6, 2016	PlayStation VR, Oculus Rift, SteamVR		
Sprint Vector	Feb 8, 2018	PlayStation VR, Oculus Rift, SteamVR		
Electronauts	Aug 7, 2018	PlayStation VR, Oculus Rift, Oculus Quest, SteamVR		
Creed: Rise to Glory	Sep 25, 2018	PlayStation VR, Oculus Rift, Oculus Quest, SteamVR		
Battlewake	Sep 10, 2019	PlayStation VR, Oculus Rift, SteamVR		
The Walking Dead: Onslaught	Sep 29, 2020	PlayStation VR, Oculus Rift, SteamVR		
Puzzle Bobble VR: Vacation Odyssey	May 20, 2021	Oculus Quest		
Big Rumble Boxing: Creed Champions	Sep 3, 2021	Nintendo Switch, PlayStation 4, Xbox One, Microsoft Windows	Flatscreen (Non-VR) Game	
Alien: Rogue Incursion	Dec 19, 2024	PlayStation VR2, Meta Quest 3, SteamVR		

== Awards ==
Year	Game	Award	Nomination Category	Result
2019		Fast Company Most Innovative Company Awards	Games Category	Won
2019	Westworld Awakening	D.I.C.E Award	Immersive Reality Technical Achievement	Nominated
2018		Upload VR Awards	Developer of the Year	Won
2018	Sprint Vector	Golden Joystick	Best VR Game	Nominated
2018	Sprint Vector	SXSW	Best VR Game	Nominated
2018	Sprint Vector	Indigo Awards	Best Character Design	Won
2018	Sprint Vector	Gamer's Choice Awards	Best VR Game of the Year	Nominated
2018	Sprint Vector	VR Awards	VR Game of the Year	Nominated
2018	Electronauts	Indigo Awards	Best Sound Design	Won
2018	Electronauts	Indigo Awards	Best Use of Music for Games	Won
2017	Raw Data	VR Awards	VR Game of the Year	Won
2014	Zombies on the Holodeck	Proto Awards	Best Interaction Design	Won
2014	Zombies on the Holodeck	Proto Awards	Most Transportive	Won
2014	Zombies on the Holodeck	Proto Awards	Best Overall Experience	Won
