= Scarface gang =

Criminal gang

The Scarface gang (Dutch: Scarface-bende) was a criminal gang possibly from Netherlands, consisting of two to six men and sometimes a woman, which was responsible for a series of violent armed robberies in Belgium, the Netherlands, Germany and France. The gang was named "the Scarface gang" because one of the members of the gang dressed like the character Tony Montana from the 1983 American film Scarface.

During a violent robbery at the cash handling company SecurCash in Rotterdam, the robbers used explosives to enter the building and shot and wounded two employees. After a robbery at Brink's in Amsterdam, the gang fled in two cars on the A2 and were chased by the police but managed to escape. One of their cars crashed and it was burned by the robbers, who then hijacked a vehicle from another driver on the road.

== List of robberies attributed to the Scarface gang ==
Date	Robbery	Loot
2011		
19 February	Filling station in Wavre, Belgium	small amount from the cash register
22 February	Jeweller's shop in Lede, Belgium	€0
28 February	Post office in Walhain, Belgium	€0
13 March	Hotel in Machelen, Belgium	small amount from the cash register
16 March	Jeweler's shop in Wavre, Belgium	several jewels
4 April	Cash handling company SecurCash in Rotterdam, Netherlands	several millions
12 April	Cash handling company Loomis in Valence, France	€2,000,000
29 June	Cash handling company Brink's in Amsterdam, Netherlands	€12,000,000

== Fate of the gang ==
In December 2011, it was reported that four members of the gang had been arrested. Two members fled to Morocco, and another disappeared without a trace.
