= Top Gun: The Second Mission =

1989 video game

- North American box art
- Developer: Konami
- Publisher: Konami
- Designers: J. Nakamoto; Yoichi Yoshimoto
- Programmers: Shinji Kitamoto; Mitsuo Takemoto; Toru Hagihara; Nobuhiro Matsuoka
- Artists: Kenji Shimoide; Hiroshi Matsuda
- Composers: Hidenori Maezawa; Yuichi Sakakura; Harumi Ueko
- Series: Top Gun
- Platform: Nintendo Entertainment System
- Release: JP: December 15, 1989; NA: January 1990; PAL: October 24, 1991
- Genre: Combat flight simulator
- Modes: Single-player, multiplayer

Top Gun: The Second Mission, released in Japan as Top Gun: Dual Fighters, is the video game sequel to Top Gun, also produced by Konami for the Nintendo Entertainment System. It was released in Japan on December 15, 1989, in North America in January 1990, and in Europe and Australia on October 24, 1991.

== Gameplay ==
A high-resolution graphic after player 1 wins

The player assumes the role of Maverick in an F-14 Tomcat as he is summoned for a new operation, divided into three missions. The enemy is not explicitly identified but boss characters are all highly advanced Soviet Union prototypes from the time, and the enemy aces have stereotypical Russian-styled names such as "Gorky", "Demitri", and "Stalin". The first mission is to destroy the enemy's Tupolev Tu-160 Blackjack. The second mission is to destroy an advanced version of a Mil Mi-24 Hind helicopter, through an obstacle course through a forest. The third and final mission is to destroy an enemy "star wars space shuttle", with two obstacle courses of avoiding lightning bolts and laser beams. Aside from the mission mode, the player can select a one-on-one dogfight mode against seven aces or another player.

The primary weapon of the player's F-14 is its auto-cannon with unlimited ammo; one of three types of missile payloads can be attached, named after their real-life counterparts of AIM-9 Sidewinder, AIM-7 Sparrow, and AIM-54 Phoenix. In the first game, all missiles carried by F-14 are fictional models. In this game, "better" missiles like AIM-54s simply have a larger effective lock-on area. Missiles can be used to lock on and destroy ground targets in-game.

Compared to the previous Top Gun game, this features greatly improved graphics, in-game music (which appears in both the Japanese Famicom version and the arcade version of the first game), and an easier carrier landing sequence. A one or two player versus mode can dogfight.

== Reception ==
Reception

Review scores
Publication	Score
Aktueller Software Markt	8/12
Joystick	66%
Mean Machines Sega	51%
Total!	66%
Video Games (DE)	39%

The game was reviewed by several magazines in late 1991 and early 1992. Gary Meredith of Game Players found The Second Mission better than Konami's previous entries in terms of graphics and control, particularly praising the ability to roll the F14 tomcat.
