= Space Chimps (video game) =

2008 video game

- Developers: Redtribe (Note: Wicked Witch Software provided programming assistance for the console versions and were the sole developers of the PC port.); WayForward (DS)
- Publisher: Brash Entertainment
- Engine: Gamebryo
- Platforms: Nintendo DS, PlayStation 2, Wii, Windows, Xbox 360
- Release: NA: July 15, 2008; UK: August 1, 2008; AU: September 15, 2008
- Genre: Platform
- Modes: Single-player, multiplayer

Space Chimps is a platform video game based on the film of the same name. It was published by Brash Entertainment and was released for the PlayStation 2, Wii, Nintendo DS, Xbox 360, and Windows in 2008.

== Plot ==
Similar to the film, Ham III, grandson of Ham, the first chimpanzee in space, teams up with fellow spacemates Luna and Titan on a space adventure to an unknown planet.

== Gameplay ==
The player plays two characters, Ham and Luna, defeating enemies in order to defeat Zartog and save their friend, collecting gumdrop-shaped objects called Globhoppers as well as bananas along the way.

Collecting enough Globhoppers and bananas unlocks rewards such as character concepts, artwork, and videos as well as a deleted scene from the movie in which the director of the film, Kirk DeMicco, plays with actual monkeys.

== Reception ==
Reception

Aggregate score
Aggregator	Score				
Aggregator	DS	PC	PS2	Wii	Xbox 360
Metacritic	59/100	62/100	43/100	52/100	55/100

Review scores
Publication	Score				
Publication	DS	PC	PS2	Wii	Xbox 360
GamesRadar+	N/A	N/A	N/A	N/A	2/5
IGN	6.4/10	6.4/10	6.4/10	6.4/10	6.4/10
Jeuxvideo.com	5/20	N/A	4/20	4/20	4/20
NGamer	43%	N/A	N/A	N/A	N/A
Official Xbox Magazine (US)	N/A	N/A	N/A	N/A	4/10
Pocket Gamer	3/5	N/A	N/A	N/A	N/A
Variety	N/A	N/A	(negative)	N/A	N/A

The game received "mixed or average reviews" on all platforms except the PlayStation 2 version, which received "generally unfavorable reviews" according to the review aggregation website Metacritic.
