= Top Gun (1987 video game) =

1987 video game

- North American cover art
- Developer: Konami
- Publisher: Konami
- Designers: Bonobo Noriko; Kitt Bunko; Kujakusuma Akemi; Nekomanma Iku; Amadeus Mitchy
- Programmers: Camry Yatchan; Howitzer E-DA; Katino Mu
- Artists: Kenji Shimoide; Naoki Sato; Daibutsu Mari
- Composers: Kiyohiro Sada; Kauzi Muraoka; Kouji Murata
- Series: Top Gun
- Platform: Nintendo Entertainment System
- Release: NA: November 1987; JP: December 11, 1987; EU: 1988
- Genres: Shoot 'em up, combat flight simulation
- Mode: Single-player
- Arcade system: Nintendo VS. System

Top Gun is a shoot 'em up combat flight simulation game based on the 1986 film of the same name. It was developed and published by Konami for the Nintendo Entertainment System. It was released in North America in November 1987, Japan in December 1987, and then in Europe a year later. It is an adaptation of VS. Top Gun, a 1987 Nintendo VS. System arcade game also by Konami. As the second game to establish the Top Gun game series, it was followed by Top Gun: The Second Mission. It is known for its extremely high difficulty.

== Gameplay ==
Introductory animation of a jet

Top Gun is a first-person shoot 'em up combat flight simulation game played from the perspective of an F-14 fighter pilot. The game is based on the 1986 hit film Top Gun, and features four levels, with each requiring the player to fight off enemy MiGs. In the game's second level, the player must also destroy an enemy aircraft carrier. For the final two levels respectively, the player's target is an enemy fortress and a space shuttle on a launch pad (the last mission occurs at night). The player has three lives in the form of F-14 planes. The destruction of all three planes yields a game over screen with no continues.

The player has unlimited machine gun ammunition and three different types of missile, each one with their own advantages. MiGs also have their own missiles, which the player must avoid or destroy. The player is presented with onscreen information such as altitude, air speed, a radar, and a fuel gauge. Once during each level, the player can call in a tanker plane to refuel the F-14 (refueling is optional in first level, but is required in the other three levels as the plane will not have enough fuel to last the entire level otherwise). Refueling is done in mid-air, and the player must align the F-14 with the refueling drogue. After each level, the player must successfully land the F-14 on a U.S. aircraft carrier.

== Reception ==
NES reviews

Review scores
Publication	Score
ACE	808/1000
AllGame	4/5
Computer and Video Games	82%
Total!	69%
The Games Machine	65%
Player One	70/100
Power Play	4/10

Top Gun was a commercial hit. It was the top-selling game in the United States for two weeks in January 1988. By 1989, its sales had surpassed 1.8 million units in the United States, eventually reaching two million copies. Eugene Lacey of Computer and Video Games praised the graphics and sound, and was surprised by "the level of sophistication that the designers have achieved" with the gameplay considering the limited number of buttons on the NES controller. Lacey called it an "excellent" flight game addition to the NES library. The Games Machine stated that like most NES games, Top Gun had an emphasis on playability rather than graphical presentation. The magazine described the graphics as "little more than a detailed cockpit and fast moving enemies", but stated that the game succeeded in playability with its levels. The Games Machine added that the landing and refueling segments, and the necessary missile strategy, help to "spruce up the action".

Steve Jarratt of ACE praised the sound effects and wrote that Top Gun "is visually sparse but the sprites are extremely effective – especially in the air-to-air combat". Jarratt praised the large amount of "varied and entertaining" action, and stated that the game would appeal to fans of shoot 'em up games. German magazine Power Play criticized the gameplay's lack of playful variety. Ulrich Mühl of Aktueller Software Markt praised the graphics and sound. French magazine Player One said the graphics were good for an NES game.

Total! reviewed the game in 1993, and considered the gameplay too simplistic because the levels were too few and similar, but found variety in the landing and refueling segments. The magazine concluded, "While Top Gun's a fun blast, it hasn't got any lasting pull." In a later review for the website AllGame, Christopher Michael Baker praised the graphics and realistic sound effects, and stated that it was arguably the best air warfare game ever released for the NES. However, Baker stated that it also offered much frustration with its difficulty. Baker cited three primary reasons for the difficulty, including the split-second decisions required in determining whether to avoid or destroy missiles, and the lack of continues. Baker also cited the landing and refueling segments, writing that they require "a soft touch and total concentration", and that they are "difficult, if not impossible, to master".
