= Redtribe =

Australian video game developer

- Type: Video game developer
- Industry: Video games
- Founded: 2003
- Headquarters: Melbourne, Australia
- Key people: Chris Mosely (CEO)
- Website: http://www.redtribe.com

Redtribe was an Australian video game developer that was co-founded in 2003 by game developer and entrepreneur Chris Mosely and Samantha Robson. Chris Mosely was previously the CEO and founder of Blue Tongue Entertainment in 1995. RedTribe was the first Australian developer to release a game on the Xbox 360 & Wii in Australia & New Zealand.

RedTribe won the Business3000 "Export Business of the Year" and the overall "Business of the Year" awards in 2007.

== Released games ==
Redtribe has released games on PlayStation 2, Xbox 360, Wii and PC

- Looney Tunes: Acme Arsenal - 2007
- Space Chimps - 2008
- Jumper: Griffin's Story - 2008
- Hairy Balls - 2013
