= Brash Entertainment =

American video game publisher

Brash Entertainment LLC.
- Industry: Video games
- Founded: 2007
- Founder: Thomas Tull, Bert Ellis, Nicholas Longano, and Mitch Davis
- Defunct: November 6, 2008
- Headquarters: U.S.
- Key people: President and COO: Nicholas Longano; CEO and Chairman: Mitch Davis
- Products: Video games
- Website: www.brashent.com

Brash Entertainment LLC. was an American video game publisher focused on licensed games. The company was co-founded in 2007 by Thomas Tull, Bert Ellis, President and COO Nicholas Longano, and CEO and Chairman Mitch Davis.

Of the first three games produced (Alvin and the Chipmunks, Jumper: Griffin's Story and Space Chimps) Alvin was the only one to sell moderately well at 360,000 copies. Despite this, all three lost money and the stigma of low quality products made some developers wary of doing business with them.

The company also announced a series of games built around the Saw film franchise. On November 6, 2008, Variety reported that Brash was short on money and was in talks of returning the movie rights back to its holders. During this time Brash was forced to stop paying some of its developers as well as modify the release schedule of the next year to only two titles (Saw and Six Flags: Fun Park) On November 14, 2008 the company went out of business.

Several sources such as Kotaku and Joystiq hinted that Brash had the rights to develop titles based on franchises by DC Comics. Developers Factor 5 and Bottlerocket Entertainment were developing a title based on Superman and The Flash, respectively.

== Games released ==
- Alvin and the Chipmunks (2007, PlayStation 2, Wii, Nintendo DS, PC)
- Jumper: Griffin's Story (2008, PlayStation 2, Wii, Xbox 360)
- Space Chimps (2008, PlayStation 2, Wii, Nintendo DS, Xbox 360, PC)
- Six Flags: Fun Park (Nintendo DS)

=== Released under new publishers ===
After Brash officially ceased all operation due to financial troubles, some of the licenses for games were bought out by other companies. Some games were already far enough into development to be released under a new publisher.

- The Tale of Despereaux (2008, PlayStation 2, Wii, Nintendo DS, PC), published by Atari and Universal Pictures Digital Platforms Group)
- Six Flags: Fun Park (2009, Wii, published by Ubisoft)
- Saw (2009, Xbox 360, PlayStation 3, Microsoft Windows, published by Konami)
- Prison Break: The Conspiracy (2010, PlayStation 3, Xbox 360, Windows, published by Deep Silver, developed by ZootFly)
- Clash of the Titans (2010, PlayStation 3, Xbox 360, published by Bandai Namco Games, developed by Game Republic)
