= Scarface (iOS game) =

2012 video game

- Developer: Fuse Powered Inc.
- Platforms: iOS, Android
- Release: April 26, 2012
- Genre: Role-playing

Scarface is a role-playing video game developed by Canadian studio Fuse Powered Inc. and released on April 26, 2012, for iOS and Android. It is based on the 1983 film of the same name.

== Critical reception ==
The game has a rating of 38% on Metacritic based on 4 critic reviews.

Slidetoplay said "Scarface is a movie-themed Mafia Wars with less to do and more profanity." Gamezebo wrote "Scarface for iOS has the foundation of a solid social adventure, but it doesn't expand on its component parts in any interesting ways. The lines of dialogue might be enough to draw fans in initially, but pedestrian gameplay will do precious little to keep them coming back for more." 148apps said "There's a fantastic license within but Scarface is really very disappointing and gangster fans won't be impressed at all." Modojo wrote "In tribute, execution, design and characterization, Scarface is nothing less than a dreadful game: a mindless skinner-box that doesn't even offer up enough temptation to make you want to take another peck at it. The score it achieves reflects only that the game does what it does without breaking itself in the process."
