= 24th Saturn Awards =

US film and television award ceremony

- Date: June 10, 1998
- Site: California, U.S.

Highlights
- Most awards: Men in Black (3)
- Most nominations: Face/Off (9)

The 24th Saturn Awards, honoring the best in science fiction, fantasy and horror film and television in 1997, were held on June 10, 1998.

Below is a complete list of nominees and winners. Winners are highlighted in bold.

== Winners and nominees ==
=== Film ===
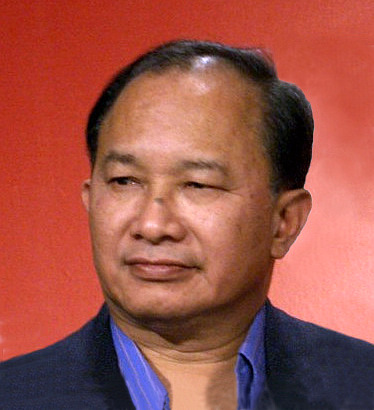
John Woo, Best Director winner

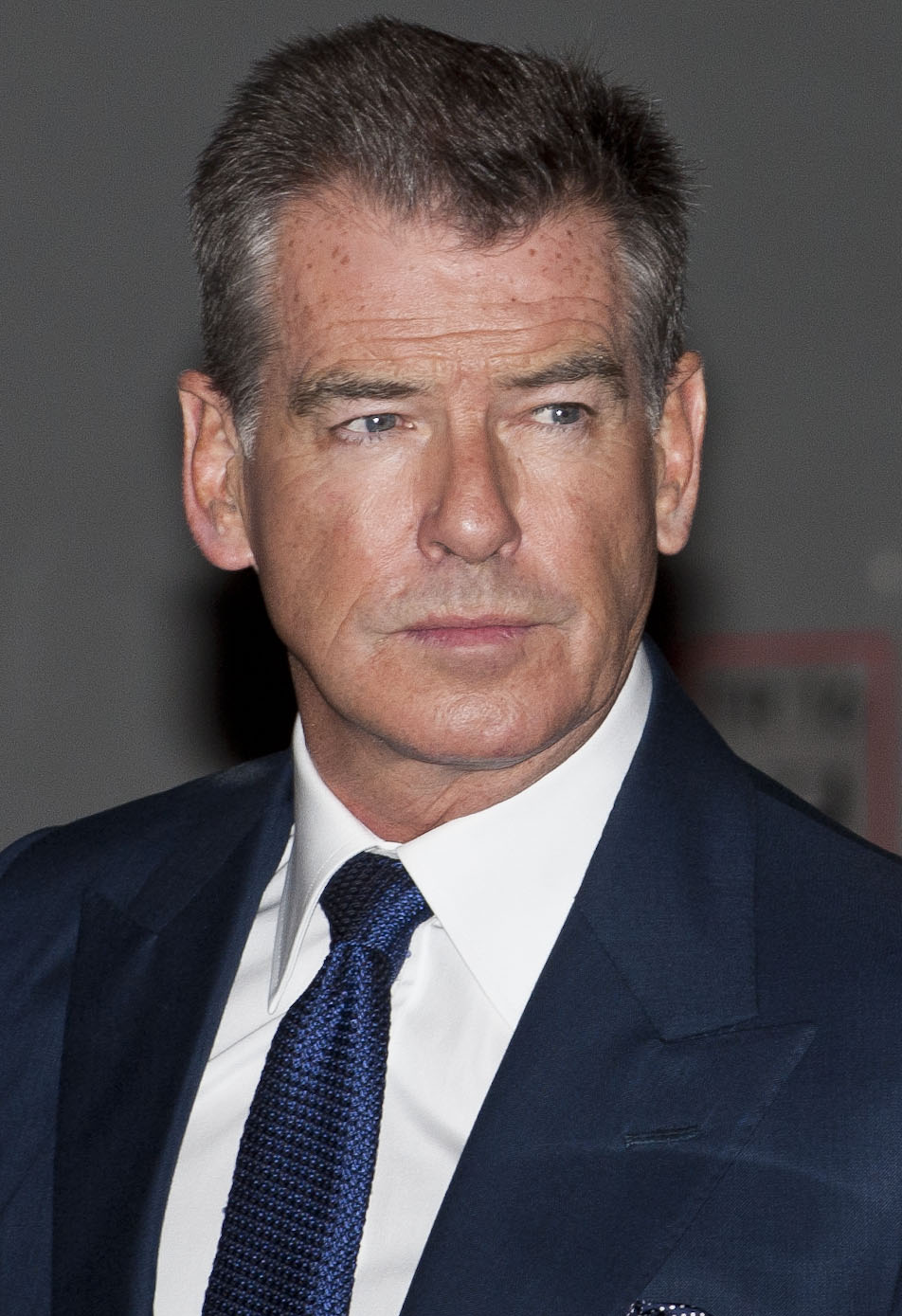
Pierce Brosnan, Best Actor winner

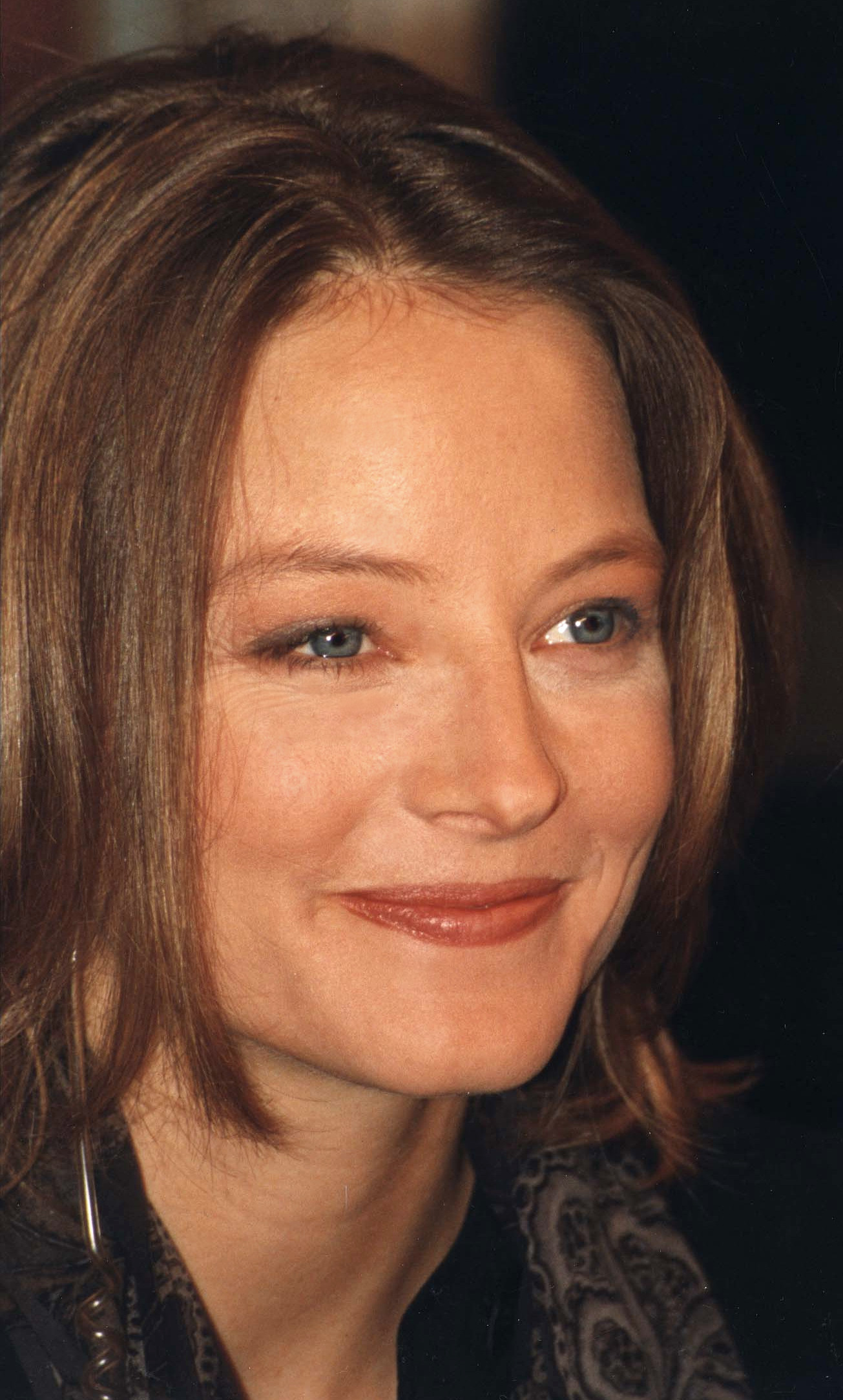
Jodie Foster, Best Actress winner

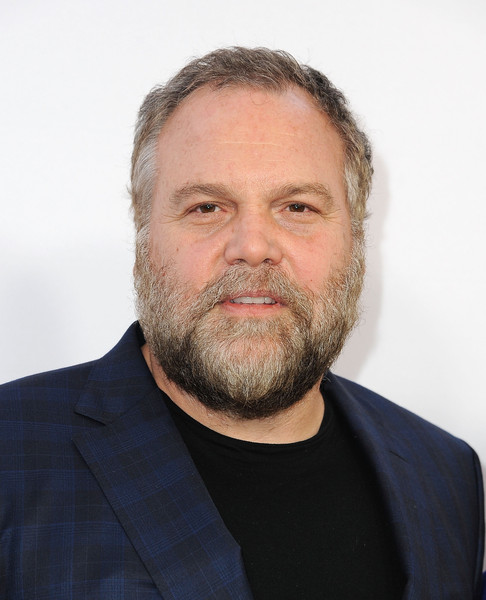
Vincent D'Onofrio, Best Supporting Actor winner

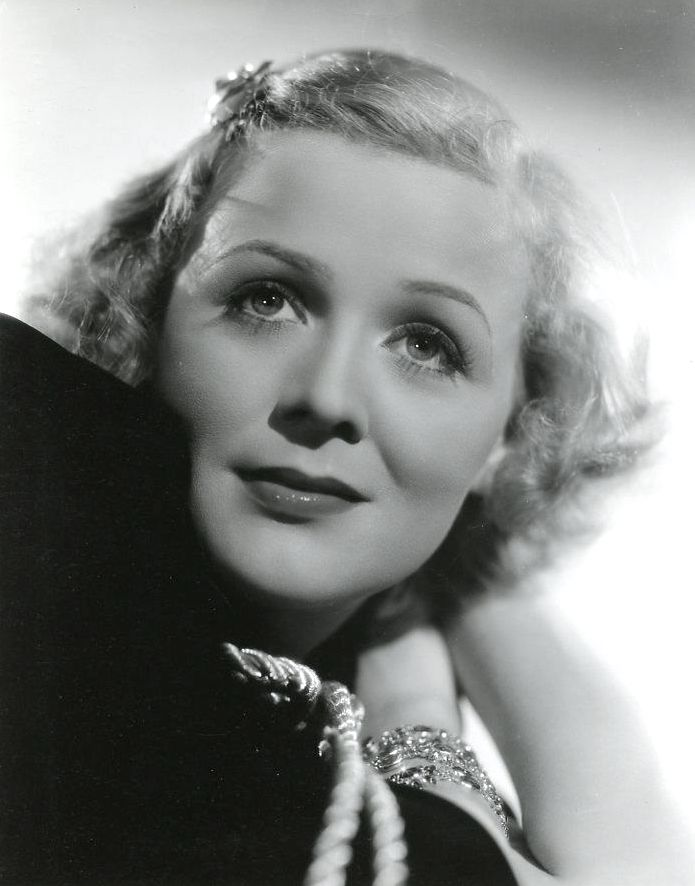
Gloria Stuart, Best Supporting Actress winner

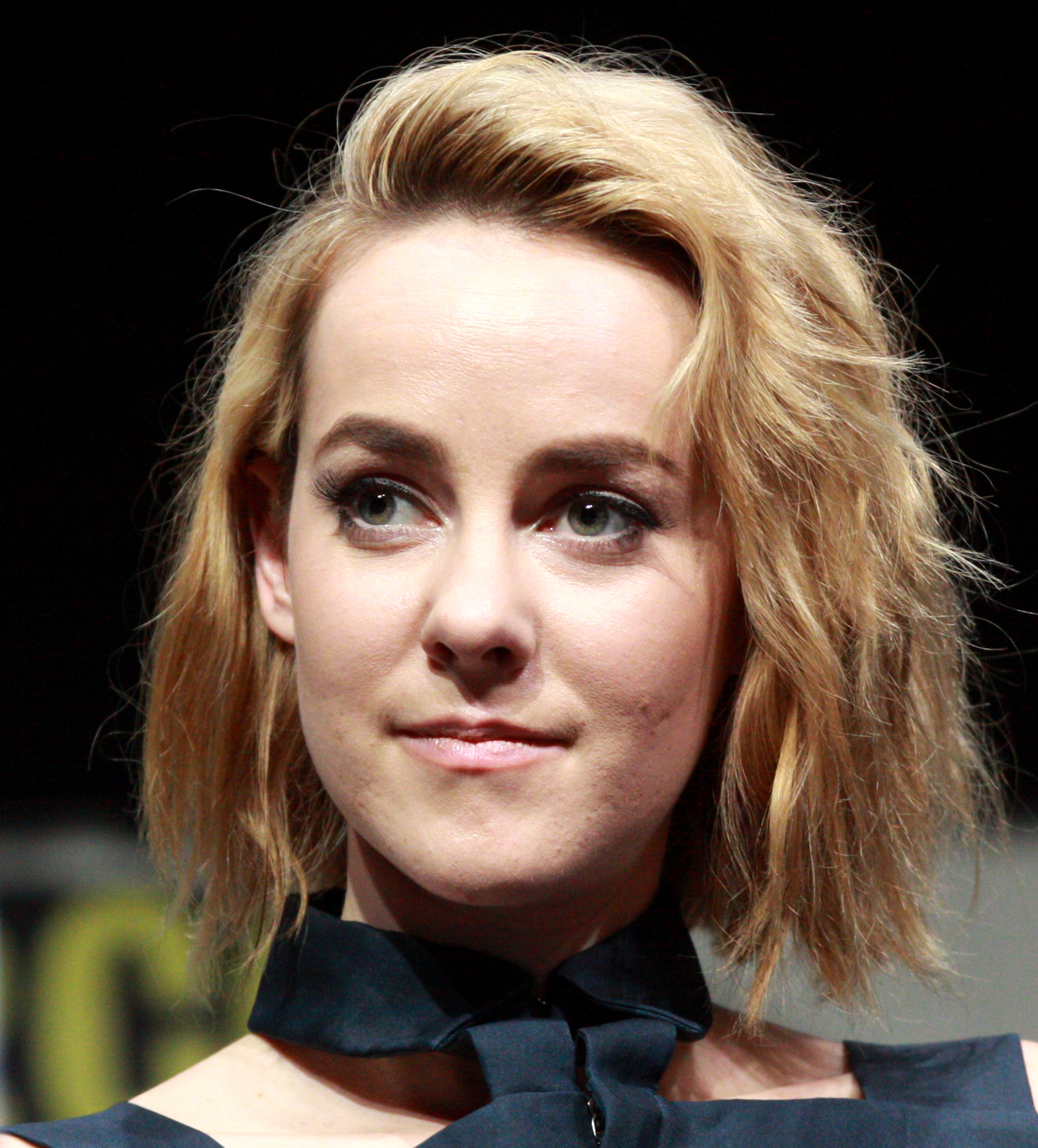
Jena Malone, Best Performance by a Younger Actor/Actress winner

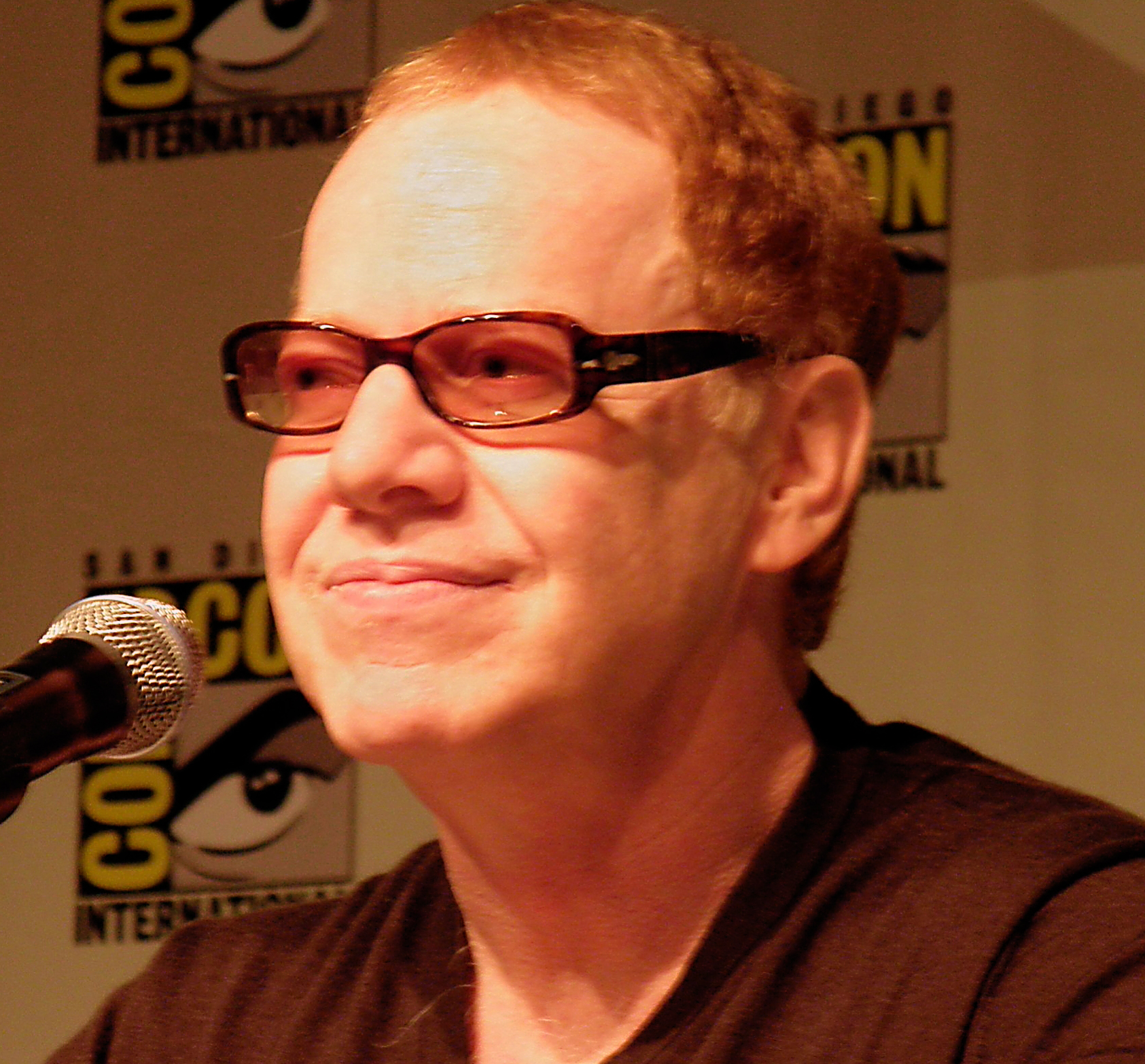
Danny Elfman, Best Music winner

Best Actor	Best Actress
**Pierce Brosnan – Tomorrow Never Dies as James Bond**; Nicolas Cage – Face/Off as Caster Troy; Kevin Costner – The Postman as The Postman; Al Pacino – The Devil's Advocate as John Milton / Satan; Will Smith – Men in Black as Agent J (Jay); John Travolta – Face/Off as Sean Archer	**Jodie Foster – Contact as Dr. Eleanor "Ellie" Ann Arroway**; Neve Campbell – Scream 2 as Sidney Prescott; Pam Grier – Jackie Brown as Jackie Brown; Jennifer Lopez – Anaconda as Terri Flores; Mira Sorvino – Mimic as Dr. Susan Tyler; Sigourney Weaver – Alien Resurrection as Ripley 8
Best Supporting Actor	Best Supporting Actress
**Vincent D'Onofrio – Men in Black as Edgar / The Bug**; Steve Buscemi – Con Air as Garland "The Marietta Mangler" Greene; Robert Forster – Jackie Brown as Max Cherry; Will Patton – The Postman as General Bethlehem; Pete Postlethwaite – The Lost World: Jurassic Park as Roland Tembo; J. T. Walsh – Breakdown as Warren "Red" Barr	**Gloria Stuart – Titanic as Old Rose**; Joan Allen – Face/Off as Eve Archer; Courteney Cox – Scream 2 as Gale Weathers; Teri Hatcher – Tomorrow Never Dies as Paris Carver; Milla Jovovich – The Fifth Element as Leeloo; Winona Ryder – Alien Resurrection as Annalee Call
Best Performance by a Younger Actor/Actress	Best Director
**Jena Malone – Contact as Young Ellie**; Vanessa Lee Chester – The Lost World: Jurassic Park as Kelly Curtis; Alexander Goodwin – Mimic as Chuy Gavoila; Sam Huntington – Jungle 2 Jungle as Mimi-Siku Cromwell; Dominique Swain – Face/Off as Jamie Archer; Mara Wilson – A Simple Wish as Annabel Greening	**John Woo – Face/Off**; Jean-Pierre Jeunet – Alien Resurrection; Barry Sonnenfeld – Men in Black; Steven Spielberg – The Lost World: Jurassic Park; Paul Verhoeven – Starship Troopers; Robert Zemeckis – Contact
Best Writing	Best Costumes
**Mike Werb and Michael Colleary – Face/Off**; Guillermo del Toro and Matthew Robbins – Mimic; James V. Hart and Michael Goldenberg – Contact; Jonathan Lemkin and Tony Gilroy – The Devil's Advocate; Edward Neumeier – Starship Troopers; Ed Solomon – Men in Black	**Starship Troopers – Ellen Mirojnick**; Alien Resurrection – Bob Ringwood; Austin Powers: International Man of Mystery – Deena Appel; Batman & Robin – Ingrid Ferrin and Robert Turturice; The Fifth Element – Jean Paul Gaultier; Gattaca – Colleen Atwood
Best Make-up	Best Music
**Mimic – Rick Lazzarini and Gordon J. Smith**; Batman & Robin – Ve Neill and Jeff Dawn; The Devil's Advocate – Luigi Rocchetti and Neal Martz; Face/Off – David Atherton and Kevin Yagher; Men in Black – Rick Baker, David LeRoy Anderson, and Katherine James; Spawn – Cindy J. Williams (K.N.B. EFX Group Inc.)	**Danny Elfman – Men in Black**; David Arnold – Tomorrow Never Dies; Michael Nyman – Gattaca; John Powell – Face/Off; Alan Silvestri – Contact; Joseph Vitarelli – Commandments
Best Special Effects	Best Science Fiction Film
**Starship Troopers – Phil Tippett, Scott E. Anderson, Alec Gillis, Tom Woodruff Jr., and John Richardson**; Alien Resurrection – Pitof, Erik Henry, Alec Gillis, and Tom Woodruff Jr.; Contact – Ken Ralston, Stephen Rosenbaum, Jerome Chen, and Mark Holmes; The Fifth Element – Karen E. Goulekas and Mark Stetson; The Lost World: Jurassic Park – Dennis Muren, Stan Winston, Michael Lantieri, and Randy Dutra; Men in Black – Eric Brevig, Peter Chesney, Rob Coleman, and Rick Baker	**Men in Black**; Alien Resurrection; Contact; The Fifth Element; The Postman; Starship Troopers
Best Action/Adventure/Thriller Film	Best Fantasy Film
**L.A. Confidential**; Breakdown; Face/Off; The Game; Titanic; Tomorrow Never Dies	**Austin Powers: International Man of Mystery**; Batman & Robin; George of the Jungle; Hercules; The Lost World: Jurassic Park; Mouse Hunt
Best Horror Film	Best Home Video Release
**The Devil's Advocate**; Anaconda; I Know What You Did Last Summer; Mimic; Phantoms; Scream 2	**Cats Don't Dance**; Beauty and the Beast: The Enchanted Christmas; The Haunted World of Edward D. Wood Jr.; The Prophecy II; Texas Chainsaw Massacre: The Next Generation; Wishmaster

=== Television ===
==== Programs ====
Best Genre Network Series	Best Genre Cable/Syndicated Series
**Buffy the Vampire Slayer (The WB)**; Profiler (NBC); The Simpsons (Fox); Star Trek: Voyager (UPN); The Visitor (Fox); The X-Files (Fox)	**The Outer Limits (Showtime)**; Babylon 5 (Syndicated); Earth: Final Conflict (Syndicated); Star Trek: Deep Space Nine (Syndicated); Stargate SG-1 (Showtime); Xena: Warrior Princess (Syndicated)
Best Single Genre Television Presentation
**The Shining (ABC)**; Cinderella (ABC); House of Frankenstein (NBC); Invasion (NBC); Retroactive (Showtime); Snow White: A Tale of Terror (Showtime)

==== Acting ====
Best Genre TV Actor	Best Genre TV Actress
**Steven Weber – The Shining (ABC) as Jack Torrance**; Richard Dean Anderson – Stargate SG-1 (Showtime) as Jack O'Neill; Nicholas Brendon – Buffy the Vampire Slayer (The WB) as Xander Harris; John Corbett – The Visitor (Fox) as Adam MacArthur; David Duchovny – The X-Files (Fox) as Fox Mulder; Michael T. Weiss – The Pretender (NBC) as Jarod	**Kate Mulgrew – Star Trek: Voyager (UPN) as Kathryn Janeway**; Gillian Anderson – The X-Files (Fox) as Dana Scully; Sarah Michelle Gellar – Buffy the Vampire Slayer (The WB) as Buffy Summers; Jeri Ryan – Star Trek: Voyager (UPN) as Seven of Nine; Ally Walker – Profiler (NBC) as Samantha Waters; Peta Wilson – La Femme Nikita (USA) as Nikita

=== Special awards ===
George Pal Memorial Award

- Dean Devlin

Life Career Award

- Michael Crichton
- James Karen

President's Award

- James Cameron

Service Award

- Bradley Marcus and Kevin Marcus

Special Award

- Gods and Monsters
