= Barracuda (upcoming film) =

- Directed by: Neil Burger
- Written by: Adam Mason; Simon Boyes
- Produced by: Arianne Fraser; Delphine Perrier; Henry Winterstern; Jack Rapke; Aaron Rapke; Kia Jam; Todd Lundbohm; Petr Jákl; Joe Di Maio
- Starring: Anthony Mackie; Dafne Keen; Steven Bauer; Anthony Del Negro
- Production companies: Highland Film Group; ImageMovers; K. Jam Media; 828 Productions; R.U. Robot Studios
- Distributed by: Foxx Media Group (Czech Republic); Amazon Prime Video (International)
- Countries: United States; Czech Republic
- Language: English

Barracuda is an upcoming action thriller film directed by Neil Burger and written by Adam Mason and Simon Boyes. It stars Anthony Mackie as Karl, Dafne Keen as Jodie, Steven Bauer, and Anthony Del Negro as Suarez. The film is executive produced by Robert Zemeckis.

== Cast ==
- Anthony Mackie as Karl
- Dafne Keen as Jodie
- Steven Bauer
- Anthony Del Negro as Suarez
- Don Worley

== Production ==
In April 2026, it was announced that Neil Burger would be directing an action thriller film, written by Adam Mason and Simon Boyes, and starring Anthony Mackie, Dafne Keen, Steven Bauer, and Anthony Del Negro, and executive produced by Robert Zemeckis.

Principal photography began in March 2026, in Las Cruces, New Mexico, and wrapped in May.

== Release ==
In May 2026, Foxx Media Group acquired the Czech Republic distribution rights to the film, while Amazon acquired rights for multiple territories at the 2026 Cannes Film Market.
