= Flight (2012 film) =

2012 film by Robert Zemeckis

- Theatrical release poster
- Directed by: Robert Zemeckis
- Written by: John Gatins
- Produced by: Walter F. Parkes; Laurie MacDonald; Steve Starkey; Robert Zemeckis; Jack Rapke
- Starring: Denzel Washington; Don Cheadle; Kelly Reilly; John Goodman; Bruce Greenwood; Melissa Leo
- Cinematography: Don Burgess
- Edited by: Jeremiah O'Driscoll
- Music by: Alan Silvestri
- Production companies: Parkes+MacDonald Image Nation; ImageMovers
- Distributed by: Paramount Pictures
- Release dates: October 14, 2012 (New York Film Festival); November 2, 2012 (United States)
- Running time: 138 minutes
- Country: United States
- Language: English
- Budget: $31 million
- Box office: $161.8 million

Flight is a 2012 American drama-thriller film directed by Robert Zemeckis, written by John Gatins and produced by Walter F. Parkes, Laurie MacDonald, Steve Starkey, Zemeckis, and Jack Rapke. The film stars Denzel Washington as William "Whip" Whitaker Sr., an alcoholic airline pilot who miraculously crash-lands his plane after a mechanical failure, saving nearly everyone on board. Although hailed a hero, an investigation soon begins to cast the captain in a different light.

Flight premiered at the New York Film Festival on October 14, 2012, and was theatrically released the following month on November 2, 2012 by Paramount Pictures. It received generally positive reviews from critics, who praised Washington's performance and Zemeckis's return to live-action filmmaking, his first such film since Cast Away and What Lies Beneath in 2000. The film was also a commercial success, grossing $161.8 million against a production budget of $31 million. Flight appeared on multiple critics' year-end top ten lists and received two nominations at the 85th Academy Awards for Best Actor (Washington) and Best Original Screenplay.

== Plot ==
One morning, airline pilot William "Whip" Whitaker snorts cocaine to stay alert after a night of drinking in his Orlando hotel room with flight attendant Katerina Marquez, who is scheduled to work his flight. He captains SouthJet Air Flight 227 to Atlanta. Meanwhile, a drug addict named Nicole Maggen buys heroin and overdoses.

After takeoff, the first officer, Ken Evans, takes over while Whip mixes vodka in his orange juice and takes a nap. He is jolted awake when the plane enters a catastrophic dive. Whip manages to regain partial control by rolling the aircraft upside down and executing a crash-landing in an open field. The maneuver saves 96 of the 102 people on board; the six dead include Katerina, who dies saving a child. Whip is injured and loses consciousness.

Whip awakens in an Atlanta hospital with moderate injuries and is greeted by Charlie Anderson, who represents the airline's pilots union. Charlie credits Whip with saving most of the passengers and informs him that Evans is in a coma but is expected to survive. Whip is also visited by his drug dealer, Harling Mays, who offers him alcohol, which he refuses. While smoking, Whip meets Nicole, who is also hospitalized after her overdose, and the two form a connection.

After his release, Mays drives Whip to his late father's farm. Determined to change, Whip pours out his alcohol and resolves to get sober. Whip meets with Charlie and defense attorney Hugh Lang, who explain that the National Transportation Safety Board (NTSB) performed a blood test on Whip while he was unconscious, and the toxicology report shows that Whip was intoxicated during the flight. Hugh believes he can have the evidence dismissed on a technicality, but Whip is concerned that he may face prison time and soon relapses into heavy drinking.

Whip meets up with Nicole again; she moves in with him at the farm, and the two begin a relationship. Whip's severe alcoholism clashes with Nicole's attempts to stay sober, and she repeatedly encourages him to stop drinking, but he resists. Whip visits Evans in the hospital after he comes out of his coma. Evans is severely disabled and will never fly again. When Whip tries to convince Evans to tell NTSB investigators that he was sober on the flight, Evans is upset, as he knows Whip was drunk. Despite this, he refuses to implicate Whip, believing that divine intervention placed Whip on the flight to save lives.

Nicole and Whip have a fight about his drinking, and she leaves. Feeling guilty, Whip drives to the home of his ex-wife and son, both of whom resent him. As media scrutiny intensifies before an NTSB hearing, Charlie and Hugh move Whip to a guarded hotel room with no alcohol so he can sober up. Whip finds the door to an adjacent room unlocked and with a full minibar. Although he initially attempts to resist, Whip succumbs to temptation and goes on a severe drinking binge.

The next morning, Charlie discovers Whip passed out and drunk. In a desperate attempt to help him function, Mays provides cocaine to sober him up before the hearing. At the hearing, lead NTSB investigator Ellen Block confirms that the crash was caused by mechanical failure, not pilot error, and that no other pilot in simulations could have replicated Whip's successful landing. However, she also reveals that empty vodka bottles were found on the plane, and because Whip's toxicology report is inadmissible, the only crew member officially recorded as intoxicated is Katerina. A tearful Whip, unable to blame Katerina for his actions, confesses the truth: he drank the vodka then and is currently drunk.

Thirteen months later, an imprisoned but content Whip is lecturing a support group of fellow inmates. Whip is serving a five-year sentence and will probably never fly again, which he believes is fair. However, he is proud of having done the right thing and staying sober. He is also working to rebuild his relationships with Nicole and his son, who visits to interview Whip for a college application essay. He begins by asking, "Who are you?" As a plane flies overhead, Whip replies, "That's a good question."

== Cast ==
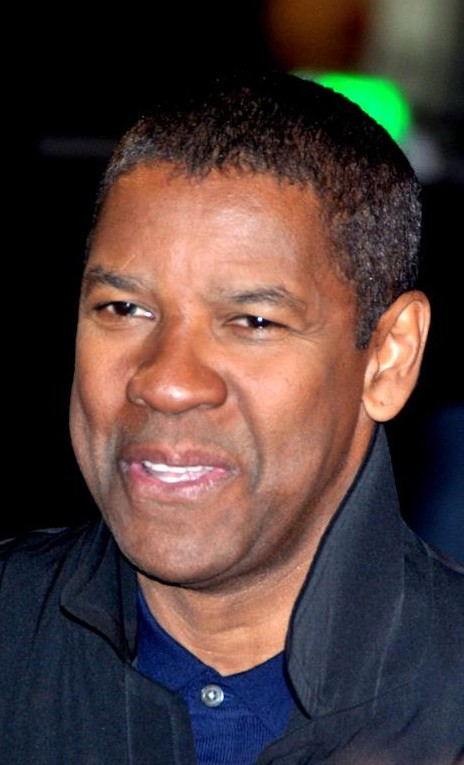
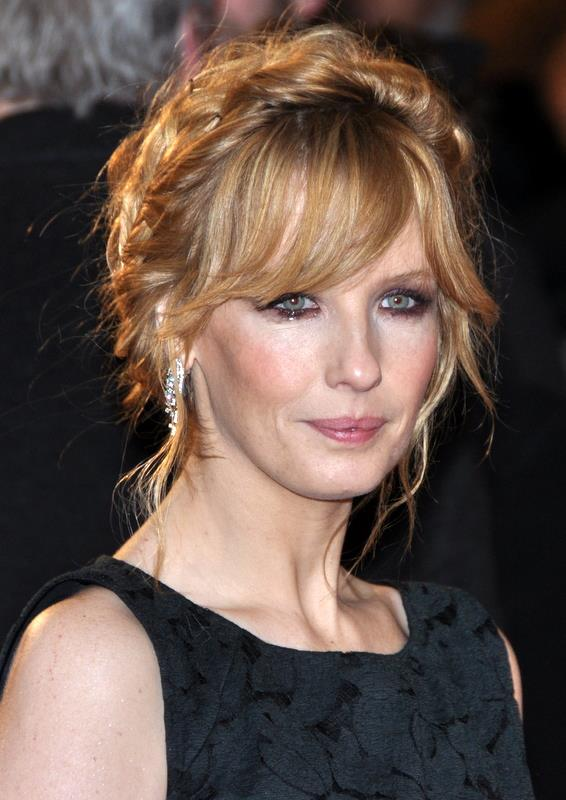
Denzel Washington and Kelly Reilly in Paris at the film's French premiere, January 2013.
- Denzel Washington as Captain William "Whip" Whitaker
- Don Cheadle as Hugh Lang
- Kelly Reilly as Nicole Maggen
- John Goodman as Harling Mays
- Bruce Greenwood as Charlie Anderson
- Brian Geraghty as First Officer Ken Evans
- Tamara Tunie as Margaret Thomason
- Melissa Leo as Ellen Block
- Nadine Velazquez as Katerina Marquez
- Peter Gerety as Avington Carr
- Garcelle Beauvais as Deana Coleman
- Boni Yanagisawa as Camelia Satou
- Justin Martin as Will
- James Badge Dale as Gaunt Young Man
- Piers Morgan as Himself
- E. Roger Mitchell as Craig Matson
- Sarah Clark as Radio Talk Show Host (voice)
- Vinnie Hasson as Radio Talk Show Host (voice)
- Randy Thom as Radio Stock Market Reporter (voice)
- Dennis P. Wise as Air Traffic Controller (voice)
- Paul Volle as Air Traffic Controller (voice)
- Hal Williams as Whip's Dad (voice)
- Kwesi Boakye as Young Will (voice)
- Ravi Kapoor as Dr. Kenan

== Production ==
Robert Zemeckis entered negotiations to direct Flight in April 2011, and by early June had accepted, with Denzel Washington about to finalize his own deal. It was the first time that Zemeckis and Washington had worked together on a motion picture.

By mid-September 2011, Kelly Reilly was in negotiations to play the female lead, with Don Cheadle, Bruce Greenwood, and John Goodman joining later in the month, and Melissa Leo and James Badge Dale in final negotiations. Screenwriter John Gatins said in early October 2011 that production would begin mid-month. Flight was largely filmed on location near Atlanta, Georgia over 45 days in November 2011. The film was produced with a relatively small budget of $31 million, which Zemeckis calculated to be his smallest in inflation-adjusted dollars since 1980, made possible because of tax rebates from Georgia and because Zemeckis and Washington waived their customary fees.

Gatins explained in a 2012 interview with the Los Angeles Times that the dramatic fictional crash depicted in Flight was "loosely inspired" by the 2000 crash of Alaska Airlines Flight 261, which was caused by a broken jackscrew. In that incident, an ungreased jackscrew came loose and caused a catastrophic failure from which recovery was impossible, though pilot Ted Thompson and first officer Bill Tansky were able to fly the plane inverted in the last moments of the flight. Among the captain's last words on the CVR were:

Okay we are inverted... Now we got to get it... Are we flying? We're flying... We're flying... Tell them what we're doing. At least upside down we're flying."

The Alaska Airlines 261 crash had no survivors. The airplane in Flight, a two-engine T-tail jet airliner, appears to be from the same model family as was the plane involved in the Alaska Airlines 261 disaster, a variant of the MD-80. Many elements from the accident were used in the film, such as the cause of the accident, segments of the radio communication, and the inversion of the airplane.

Scroggins Aviation Mockup & Effects was hired to supply three decommissioned MD-80 series aircraft that represented the plane in the film, with additional MD-80-series aircraft used for scenes in the cabin and cockpit.

== Reception ==
=== Release ===
Flight opened in 1,884 theaters across the US and Canada on November 2, 2012, with a runtime of 138 minutes. In its first week, the film ranked second in the American box office, grossing US$24,900,566 with an average of US$13,217 per theater. Flight earned US$93,772,375 in the US and an additional US$68,000,000 in other countries for a total of US$161,772,375, well above its US$31 million production budget.

=== Critical response ===
Flight received mostly positive reviews, and has an approval rating of 77% based on a sample of 239 critics on Rotten Tomatoes, with a weighted average of 6.90/10. The site's consensus states "Robert Zemeckis makes a triumphant return to live-action cinema with Flight, a thoughtful and provocative character study propelled by a compelling performance from Denzel Washington". Metacritic gives the film a weighted average score of 76 out of 100 based on reviews from 40 critics, indicating "generally favorable reviews". Audiences polled by CinemaScore gave the film an average grade of "A−" on an A+ to F scale.

Washington's performance received praise. The Hollywood Reporter's Todd McCarthy wrote that the film "provides Denzel Washington with one of his meatiest, most complex roles, and he flies with it". Roger Ebert of the Chicago Sun-Times gave the film four out of four, writing "Flight segues into a brave and tortured performance by Denzel Washington—one of his very best. Not often does a movie character make such a harrowing personal journey that keeps us in deep sympathy all of the way." He also noted the plane's upside-down flight scene was "one of the most terrifying flight scenes I've ever witnessed" and called the film "nearly flawless." Ebert went on to name the film the sixth best of 2012. Although the film was not nominated for Best Picture, he later noted that it deserved to be. Entertainment Weekly wrote, "Denzel Washington didn't get an Oscar nod for nothing: His performance as an alcoholic airline pilot ensnared by his own heroics is crash-and-burn epic".

The film received some criticism from pilots who questioned its realism, particularly the premise of a pilot being able to continue flying with a significant substance-abuse problem. The Air Line Pilots' Association dismissed the film as an inaccurate portrayal of an air crew and stated that "we all enjoy being entertained, but a thrilling tale should not be mistaken for the true story of extraordinary safety and professionalism among airline pilots". Airline pilot Patrick Smith also commented that "a real-life Whitaker wouldn't survive two minutes at an airline, and all commercial pilots—including, if not especially, those who've dealt with drug or alcohol addiction—should feel slandered by his ugly caricature". The pilot also criticized the portrayal of the relationship between copilot and captain, the decision of Whitaker to increase speed dangerously in a storm, and the ultimate dive and crash landing of Whitaker's aircraft.

==== Top ten lists ====
Flight was featured on 47 top ten lists by North American critics.

- 1st – Nick Digilio, WGN Radio
- 3rd – Steven Rea, Philadelphia Inquirer
- 3rd – Rafer Guzmán, Newsday
- 6th – Roger Ebert, Chicago Sun-Times
- 7th – Richard Roeper, RichardRoeper.com
- 7th – Kyle Smith, New York Post
- 8th – Brian Tallerico, Hollywood Chicago
- 9th – Michael Phillips, Chicago Tribune
- 9th – Owen Gleiberman, Entertainment Weekly

=== Awards and nominations ===
List of awards and nominations
| Award | Category | Subject | Result |
|---|---|---|---|
| Academy Award | Best Actor | Denzel Washington | Nominated |
| Academy Award | Best Original Screenplay | John Gatins | Nominated |
| AACTA Awards | Best International Actor | Denzel Washington | Nominated |
| Art Directors Guild Award | Excellence in Production Design for a Contemporary Film | Nelson Coates | Nominated |
| Black Reel Award | Best Film | Flight | Nominated |
| Black Reel Award | Best Actor | Denzel Washington | Won |
| Black Reel Award | Best Supporting Actress | Tamara Tunie | Nominated |
| Black Reel Award | Best Ensemble | The Cast of Flight | Nominated |
| Broadcast Film Critics Association Award | Best Actor | Denzel Washington | Nominated |
| Broadcast Film Critics Association Award | Best Original Screenplay | John Gatins | Nominated |
| Chicago Film Critics Association Award | Best Actor | Denzel Washington | Nominated |
| Chicago International Film Festival | Founder's Award | Robert Zemeckis | Won |
| Dallas-Fort Worth Film Critics Association Award | Best Actor | Denzel Washington | Nominated |
| Golden Globe Award | Best Actor – Motion Picture Drama | Denzel Washington | Nominated |
| Hollywood Film Festival | Spotlight Award | Kelly Reilly | Won |
| NAACP Image Award | Outstanding Motion Picture | Flight | Nominated |
| NAACP Image Award | Outstanding Actor | Denzel Washington | Won |
| NAACP Image Award | Outstanding Supporting Actor | Don Cheadle | Nominated |
| NAACP Image Award | Outstanding Writing in a Motion Picture | John Gatins | Nominated |
| National Board of Review | Spotlight Award | John Goodman, also for Argo, ParaNorman, and Trouble with the Curve | Won |
| Online Film Critics Society Award | Best Actor | Denzel Washington | Nominated |
| Palm Springs International Film Festival Award | Director of the Year | Robert Zemeckis | Won |
| Satellite Award | Best Actor – Motion Picture | Denzel Washington | Nominated |
| Satellite Award | Best Supporting Actor – Motion Picture | John Goodman | Nominated |
| Satellite Award | Best Screenplay, Original | John Gatins | Nominated |
| Satellite Award | Best Visual Effects | Jim Gibbs, Kevin Baillie, Michael Lantieri and Ryan Tudhope | Won |
| Satellite Award | Best Editing | Jeremiah O'Driscoll | Nominated |
| Satellite Award | Best Sound (Editing & Mixing) | Dennis Leonard, Dennis Sands, Randy Thom and William Kaplan | Nominated |
| Screen Actors Guild Award | Outstanding Performance by a Male Actor in a Leading Role | Denzel Washington | Nominated |
| St. Louis Gateway Film Critics Association | Best Actor | Denzel Washington | Nominated |
| St. Louis Gateway Film Critics Association | Best Scene (favorite movie scene or sequence) | The plane crash | Nominated |
| Visual Effects Society | Outstanding Supporting Visual Effects in a Feature Motion Picture | Kevin Ballie, Michael Lantieri, Chris Stoski, Ryan Tudhope | Nominated |
| Washington DC Area Film Critics Association Award | Best Actor | Denzel Washington | Nominated |
| Writers Guild of America Award | Best Original Screenplay | John Gatins | Nominated |

== See also ==
- The Pilot (1980 film)
- Alaska Airlines Flight 261, a McDonnell Douglas MD-83 that crashed under similar circumstances.
