= Kent Cullers =

American astronomer (1949–2021)

- Born: July 21, 1949; El Reno, Oklahoma, U.S.
- Died: July 17, 2021 (aged 71); Honolulu, Hawaii
- Resting place: Cryonics Institute, Clinton Township, Macomb County, Michigan
- Education: University of California, Berkeley, Phd 1980
- Occupation: Astronomer
- Years active: 1985–2005
- Employer: Ames Research Center
- Known for: Being a blind astronomer
- Board member of: LightHouse for the Blind and Visually Impaired
- Spouse(s): Carol (died 1992); Lisa Powers
- Children: 2
- Awards: 1993: NASA's Exceptional Engineering Achievement Medal; 1994:Federal Employee of the Year

Kent Cullers (July 21, 1949 – July 17, 2021) was an American astronomer, who was a manager of SETI's Project Phoenix. In 2005, he retired from the SETI Institute.

== Early life and education ==
Cullers was born in July 1949 in El Reno, Oklahoma, the son of an oil field engineer. His birth was premature and to save his life he was placed in an incubator filled with pure oxygen. The excess oxygen damaged his retinas, leaving him totally blind. His father, a physicist, read astronomy books to Cullers as a child, influencing his later aspirations. He grew up in Temple City, California, where he was a highly ranked student. He first studied psychology at Pomona College, but against great resistance changed his major to physics midway through college. He received his PhD. in physics from the University of California, Berkeley in 1980. He is the first totally blind physicist in the United States, and is believed to be the first astronomer who was blind from birth (although some astronomers have become blind in their old age, most notably Galileo Galilei).

== Career ==
Kent Cullers worked for NASA's Search for Extraterrestrial Intelligence (SETI) program upon graduating from Berkeley. From 1985 to 1990, he was the Targeted Search Signal Detection Team Leader with the SETI Institute. He developed advanced computer algorithms for detection of continuous and pulsed signals originating from distant Earth-like planets.

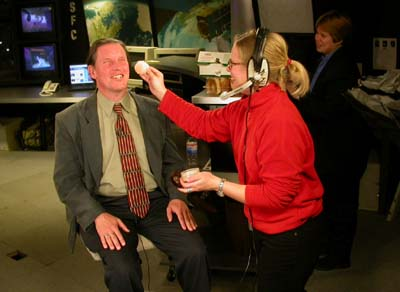
Dr. Kent Cullers, then manager of SETI's Project Phoenix, prepares to talk about the launch of "Touch the Sun". Sarah DeWitt on the right.

From 1990 to March 1994, he was the signal detection subsystem manager for the High Resolution Microwave Survey (HRMS) Project at NASA Ames Research Center, Moffett Field, California. He supervised the development of hardware and software for signal detection for HRMS. From 1993 to March 1994, Cullers led the SETI Research & Technology effort and managed the upgrading and replication of all the digital data processing equipment for HRMS. NASA's HRMS Project was cancelled by the United States Congress in October 1993, but Cullers still participated in Project Phoenix, the SETI Institute's continuation of the Targeted Search portion of HRMS. He resigned from NASA in October 1995, and rejoined the SETI Institute as a senior scientist and project manager for Project Phoenix. Cullers retired from the SETI Institute in 2005. Minor planet 35056 Cullers is named in his honor.

== In popular culture ==
Cullers was the subject of a short documentary film produced by his wife, the photographer Lisa Powers. The character Kent Clark, portrayed by William Fichtner in the 1997 film Contact, was based on Cullers.
