= A Christmas Carol (2009 film) =

Film by Robert Zemeckis

- Theatrical release poster
- Directed by: Robert Zemeckis
- Screenplay by: Robert Zemeckis
- Based on: A Christmas Carol by Charles Dickens
- Produced by: Steve Starkey; Robert Zemeckis; Jack Rapke
- Starring: Jim Carrey; Gary Oldman; Colin Firth; Bob Hoskins; Robin Wright Penn; Cary Elwes; Fionnula Flanagan
- Cinematography: Robert Presley
- Edited by: Jeremiah O'Driscoll
- Music by: Alan Silvestri
- Production companies: Walt Disney Pictures; ImageMovers Digital
- Distributed by: Walt Disney Studios; Motion Pictures
- Release dates: November 3, 2009 (London); November 6, 2009 (United States)
- Running time: 96 minutes
- Country: United States
- Language: English
- Budget: $175–200 million
- Box office: $325.3 million

A Christmas Carol (also known as Disney's A Christmas Carol) is a 2009 American animated Christmas fantasy film based on the 1843 novel of the same name by Charles Dickens. The film was directed, written, and co-produced by Robert Zemeckis, and stars a motion-captured and voice cast that includes Jim Carrey, Gary Oldman, Colin Firth, Bob Hoskins, Robin Wright Penn, Cary Elwes and Fionnula Flanagan. Produced by Walt Disney Pictures and ImageMovers Digital, and released by Walt Disney Studios Motion Pictures, it is Disney's third adaptation of the novel, following Mickey's Christmas Carol (1983) and The Muppet Christmas Carol (1992).

The film was animated through the process of motion-capture, a technique used in ImageMovers' previous animated films including The Polar Express (2004), Monster House (2006), and Beowulf (2007). Like the previous films Zemeckis has directed, Alan Silvestri returned to compose the score. A Christmas Carol was the first film produced by ImageMovers Digital, and also was, along with Mars Needs Moms (2011), the only two ImageMovers Digital projects made, before the studio was shut down by The Walt Disney Company for poor box-office results.

A Christmas Carol had its world premiere in London on November 3, 2009, which coincided with the switching-on of the annual Oxford Street and Regent Street Christmas lights; it was later released in Disney Digital 3D, RealD 3D, and IMAX 3D formats in the United States on November 6. It was a box office disappointment, grossing $325.3 million worldwide against a $175–200 million production budget, and received mixed reviews from critics, who criticized its dark tone and script, but praised its visuals, Silvestri's score, and the performances of Carrey and Oldman. Nevertheless, the film was nominated for Favorite Animated Movie, and Carrey won Favorite Voice From an Animated Movie at the 2010 Kids' Choice Awards.

== Plot ==
On Christmas Eve of 1836, Ebenezer Scrooge's best friend and business partner Jacob Marley dies.

Seven years later, he becomes a grumpy businessman living in Victorian London who hates Christmas. On Christmas Eve in 1843, he refuses to accept an invitation to his nephew Fred's Christmas dinner, harshly dismisses two gentlemen who are collecting donations for the poor, and only reluctantly allows his employee Bob Cratchit to have Christmas Day off. That night, Scrooge is visited by the ghost of Jacob, who is bound in chains for his sins. He tells Scrooge that three spirits will visit him over three nights, and he must heed their warnings or suffer a fate like his.

At one o'clock, Scrooge is visited by the Ghost of Christmas Past, who shows him visions of his early life, such as his lonely days in boarding school, his relationship with his younger sister Fan, and his time as an apprentice under the benevolent Mr. Fezziwig. The young Scrooge met a young woman named Belle, with whom he fell in love, but his growing obsession with wealth drove them apart. Overwhelmed, Scrooge extinguishes the Ghost's flame and returns home.

Scrooge next meets the merry Ghost of Christmas Present, who shows how others find joy on Christmas Day. Scrooge and the Ghost visit Bob's house, and he learns his family is content with their small dinner and meagre home. Scrooge takes pity on Bob's ill son Tiny Tim, whom the Ghost reveals might not survive until next Christmas. They next visit Fred's house, where Fred insists the guests raise a toast to Scrooge in spite of his stinginess. Before the Ghost dies, he shows Scrooge the evils of "Ignorance" and "Want".

Finally, the Ghost of Christmas Yet to Come appears to Scrooge and shows him a hypothetical future where an unidentified man's death is met with indifference and, in some cases, joy. Faced with the man's shrouded corpse, Scrooge asks to see tenderness associated with death, and the Ghost shows him the Cratchit family mourning the death of Tiny Tim. Finally, the Ghost takes Scrooge to a cemetery and points out a tombstone bearing Scrooge's name, confirming that he is the dead man; the stone further indicates that his death will fall on an upcoming Christmas Day. Horrified, Scrooge vows to change his ways before finding himself back in his bedroom.

Discovering it is Christmas Day, a gleeful Scrooge begins spreading happiness and joy around London, anonymously sending the Cratchits a turkey, providing charity to one of the gentlemen, and attending Fred's Christmas dinner. The next day, Scrooge raises Bob's salary and pledges his support for the Cratchits. Scrooge becomes a father figure to Tiny Tim (who overcomes his illness) and is restored to health, and treats everyone with kindness, generosity, and compassion, thus embodying the Christmas spirit.

== Cast ==
- Jim Carrey as Ebenezer Scrooge, a penny-pinching and pessimistic grumpy man who hates Christmas; his sheer greedy nature is forged by his traumatic youth and all things which engender happiness.
  Carrey also portrays:
  - Ghost of Christmas Past, who is depicted as an androgynous man with a flickering flame for a head and a body like a candle and speaks with an Irish accent.
  - Ghost of Christmas Present, who is depicted as a towering man with red hair, a full beard, and a green ermine robe, and is a jolly figure prone to hearty laughter and speaks with a Yorkshire accent.
  - Ghost of Christmas Yet to Come, who is depicted as an ominous shadow of Scrooge's alter ego. His appearance is of a figure in a large black hooded cloak.
- Gary Oldman as
  - Bob Cratchit, Scrooge's humble clerk.
  - Jacob Marley, the ghost of Scrooge's ex-business partner who is bound in chains for his sins.
  - Oldman also provides the motion-capture for Tiny Tim, Cratchit's youngest son.
- Colin Firth as Fred, Scrooge's optimistic nephew and only living relative. He is the son of Scrooge's long-dead sister Fan.
- Robin Wright Penn as
  - Belle, Scrooge's neglected fiancée.
  - Fan (motion-capture), Scrooge's beloved late sister who was the mother of Fred.
- Bob Hoskins as Mr. Nigel Fezziwig, the proprietor of a warehouse business for whom Scrooge worked as a young apprentice.
  - Hoskins also portrays Old Joe, a fence who buys the belongings of the deceased Scrooge from Mrs. Dilber.
- Cary Elwes as Dick Wilkins/Portly Gentleman #1/Mad Fiddler/Guest #2/Business Man #1
  - Elwes would also act as a stand-in for Scrooge or the Ghosts of Christmas Past and Present in scenes where these characters appear together, as all were portrayed by Jim Carrey.
- Fionnula Flanagan as Mrs. Dilber, Scrooge's charwoman.
- Lesley Manville as Mrs. Emily Cratchit
- Fay Masterson as Martha Cratchit/Guest #1/Caroline
- Molly C. Quinn as Belinda Cratchit
- Daryl Sabara as Peter Cratchit/Undertaker's Apprentice/Tattered Caroler #1/Beggar Boy #1/Well-Dressed Caroler #1
- Leslie Zemeckis as Janet Holywell, credited as "Fred's Wife".
- Steve Valentine as Funerary Undertaker/Topper
- Julian Holloway as Fat Cook/Portly Gentleman #2/Business Man #3
- Sammi Hanratty as Beggar Boy #3/Young Cratchit Girl/Want Girl/Fan (voice)
- Sage Ryan as Tattered Caroler #2/Tiny Tim (additional motion-capture)
- Ryan Ochoa as Tattered Caroler #4/Beggar Boy #2/Young Cratchit Boy/Ignorance Boy/Young Boy with Sleigh/Tiny Tim (voice)
- Amber Gainey Meade as Tattered Caroler #3/ Well-Dressed Caroler #2
- Bobbi Page as Tattered Caroler #5/Well-Dressed Caroler #3
- Ron Bottitta as Tattered Caroler #6/Well-Dressed Caroler #4
- Jacquie Barnbrook as Mrs. Allie Fezziwig/Fred's sister-in-law/Well-Dressed Caroler #5
- Paul Blackthorne as Guest #3/Business Man #2
- Michael Hyland as Guest #4
- Kerry Hoyt as Adult Ignorance
- Julene Renee-Preciado as Adult Want

== Production ==
After making The Polar Express (2004), Robert Zemeckis stated that he "fell in love with digital theater" and tried finding an avenue to use the format again. He eventually decided that an adaptation of Charles Dickens's A Christmas Carol would be an opportunity to achieve this. Upon rereading the story, he realized that "the story has never been realized in a way that it was actually imagined by Charles Dickens as he wrote it," as well as that "it's as if he wrote this story to be a movie because it's so visual and so cinematic." Zemeckis has stated previously that A Christmas Carol is one of his favorite stories dealing with time travel. Jim Carrey, who played Ebenezer Scrooge and each of the three spirits, has described the film as "a classical version of A Christmas Carol [...] There are a lot of vocal things, a lot of physical things, I have to do. Not to mention doing the accents properly, the English, Irish accents [...] I want it to fly in the UK. I want it to be good and I want them to go, 'Yeah, that's for real.' We were very true to the book. It's beautiful. It's an incredible film."

The Walt Disney Company partnered with Amtrak to promote the film with a special nationwide exhibition train tour, starting at Los Angeles in May 2009 and visiting 40 cities, finishing in New York City in November.

== Soundtrack ==
The film's music was composed, orchestrated, and conducted by Alan Silvestri. The film's music was also orchestrated by William Ross, Conrad Pope and John Ashton Thomas and performed by London Voices and The Hollywood Studio Symphony. Much of the film's music was based on traditional Christmas carols such as "God Rest You Merry, Gentlemen", "Deck the Halls", "O Come, All Ye Faithful", "Hark! The Herald Angels Sing" and "Joy to the World". The film's theme song, titled "God Bless Us Everyone", was written by Glen Ballard and Alan Silvestri and performed by Italian classical crossover tenor Andrea Bocelli. The film's soundtrack album was recorded in 2009 at The Newman Scoring Stage in Los Angeles, California. The film's soundtrack album was also released on 3 November 2009 by Walt Disney Records.

"Present" by JUJU is the theme song for the Japanese version.

== Release ==
A Christmas Carol opened in London on November 3, 2009, and was theatrically released on November 6, 2009, in the United States by Walt Disney Studios Motion Pictures.

=== Home media ===
Walt Disney Studios Home Entertainment released the film on November 16, 2010 in a single-disc DVD, two-disc 2D Blu-ray/DVD combo and in a four-disc combo pack that includes a Blu-ray 3D, a regular Blu-ray, a DVD and a digital copy. This marked the first time that a film was available in Blu-ray 3D the same day as a standard Blu-ray, as well as Disney's first in the Blu-ray 3D market along with Alice in Wonderland (2010). The DVD contains deleted scenes and two featurettes called "On Set with Sammi" and "Capturing A Christmas Carol". The Blu-ray also has a "Digital Advent Calendar" and the featurette "Behind the Carol: The Full Motion-Capture Experience". The Blu-ray 3D has an exclusive 3D game called "Mr. Scrooge's Wild Ride".

The film grossed $69 million in home sales.

== Reception ==
=== Box office ===
A Christmas Carol grossed $137.9 million in the United States and Canada, and $187.4 million in other territories, for a worldwide total of $325.3 million. Due to its high production and marketing costs, the film lost the studio an estimated $50–100 million, and forced Mark Zoradi, president of Walt Disney Studios Motion Pictures Group and the head of worldwide marketing, to resign.

The film opened at #1 in 3,683 theaters, grossing $30.1 million its opening weekend, with an average of $8,159 per theater.

In the United Kingdom, A Christmas Carol topped the box office on two occasions; the first was when it opened, the second was five weeks later when it leapfrogged box office chart toppers 2012, The Twilight Saga: New Moon and Paranormal Activity despite family competition from Nativity!, another Christmas-themed film.

=== Critical response ===
On review aggregator Rotten Tomatoes, 52% of 196 critics have given the film a positive review with an average rating of 6/10. The site's critical consensus read, "Robert Zemeckis' 3-D animated take on the Dickens classic tries hard, but its dazzling special effects distract from an array of fine performances from Jim Carrey and Gary Oldman." On Metacritic, another aggregator, the film has a weighted average score of 55 out of 100 based on 32 critics, indicating "mixed or average" reviews. Audiences polled by CinemaScore gave the film an average grade of "B+" on an A+ to F scale.

Roger Ebert of the Chicago Sun-Times gave the film four stars out of four, calling it "an exhilarating visual experience". Owen Gleiberman of Entertainment Weekly gave the film an A, applauding the film as "a marvelous and touching yuletide toy of a movie". Joe Neumaier of the New York Daily News gave the film 3/5 stars and stated the film "is well-crafted but artless, detailed but lacking soul". Mary Elizabeth Williams of Salon.com gave the film a mixed review claiming the movie "is a triumph of something—but it's certainly not the Christmas spirit." Joe Morgenstern of The Wall Street Journal wrote in his review that the film's "tone is joyless, despite an extended passage of bizarre laughter, several dazzling flights of digital fancy, a succession of striking images and Jim Carrey's voicing of Scrooge plus half a dozen other roles." The Daily Telegraph reviewer Tim Robey wrote, "How much is gained by the half-real visual style for this story is open to question—the early scenes are laborious and never quite alive, and the explosion of jollity at the end lacks the virtue of being funny." Peter Bradshaw in The Guardian also criticized the technology: "The hi-tech sheen is impressive but in an unexciting way. I wanted to see real human faces convey real human emotions." Time Out London praised the film for sticking to Dickens' original dialogue but also questioned the technology by saying, "To an extent, this 'Christmas Carol' is a case of style—and stylisation—overwhelming substance."

In 2019, Robert Keeling of Den of Geek praised the animation. He felt Scrooge's encounter with the final ghost to be “a bit tedious, as it soon becomes an elaborate chase scene purely designed to show off the 3D” but called the film “an enjoyable and memorable version.”

=== Awards and nominations ===
Award	Category	Recipients	Result
2010 Kids' Choice Awards	Favorite Voice from an Animated Movie	Jim Carrey	Won
2010 Kids' Choice Awards	Favorite Animated Movie	A Christmas Carol	Nominated
36th Saturn Awards	Best Animated Feature	A Christmas Carol	Nominated

== See also ==
- List of Christmas films
- List of ghost films
- Adaptations of A Christmas Carol
