= Jack Rapke =

American film producer

- Born: United States
- Occupation: Film producer
- Spouse: Laurie Ann Perlman (divorced) Sandra Zundell Scheinberg ( divorced)
- Children: 2 (with Perlman)

Jack Rapke is an American film producer who has produced such films as the 2000 Robert Zemeckis film Cast Away.

== Biography ==
Rapke was born to a Jewish family and raised in Miami. Rapke graduated from Nova High School in Davie, Florida in 1968 and New York University Film School in 1974.

Rapke started his career from the mailroom of the William Morris Agency in 1975. He then worked as a talent agent at the William Morris Agency and after four years started working at Creative Artists Agency.

Rapke served seven years as co-chairman of CAA’s motion picture department, where he handled filmmakers that included Robert Zemeckis, Chris Columbus, Jerry Bruckheimer, Ridley Scott, Michael Mann, Harold Ramis, Michael Bay, Terry Gilliam, Bob Gale, Bo Goldman, Steve Kloves, Howard Franklin, Scott Frank, Robert Mark Kamen, John Hughes, Joel Schumacher, Marty Brest, and Imagine Entertainment partners Ron Howard and Brian Grazer.

Rapke left CAA in 1998 to form ImageMovers with Zemeckis. Cast Away, directed by Zemeckis and starring Tom Hanks was the company’s first feature film.

Rapke is currently producing Here to be directed by Robert Zemeckis.

He was married to Laurie Ann Perlman, who was also Jewish; they had two children before divorcing. She remarried with Gerald M. Levin. He married Sandra Scheinberg Rapke in 1991. The two divorced in 2012.

== Filmography ==
He was a producer in all films unless otherwise noted.

=== Film ===
Year	Film	Credit
2000	What Lies Beneath	
2000	Cast Away	
2003	Matchstick Men	
2004	The Polar Express	Executive producer
2005	The Prize Winner of Defiance, Ohio	
2006	Last Holiday	
2006	Monster House	
2007	Beowulf	
2009	A Christmas Carol	
2011	Mars Needs Moms	
2011	Real Steel	Executive producer
2012	Flight	
2015	The Walk	
2016	Allied	Executive producer
2018	Welcome to Marwen	
2020	The Witches	
2021	Finch	
2022	Pinocchio	Executive producer
2024	Here	
TBA	Barracuda	

Thanks

Year	Film	Role
1997	8 Heads in a Duffel Bag	The producers and director wish to thank

=== Television ===
Year	Title	Credit	Notes
2011−13	The Borgias	Executive producer	
2018	Elemental: Hydrogen vs. Hindenburg	Executive producer	
2018	Medal of Honor	Executive producer	Documentary
2018−2023	Manifest	Executive producer	
2019–2020	Project Blue Book	Executive producer	
2019	What/If	Executive producer	
