= Finch (film) =

2021 film by Miguel Sapochnik

- Promotional release poster
- Directed by: Miguel Sapochnik
- Written by: Craig Luck; Ivor Powell
- Produced by: Ivor Powell; Jack Rapke; Kevin Misher; Jacqueline Levine
- Starring: Tom Hanks; Caleb Landry Jones
- Cinematography: Jo Willems
- Edited by: Tim Porter
- Music by: Gustavo Santaolalla
- Production companies: Amblin Entertainment; Reliance Entertainment; Walden Media; ImageMovers; Misher Films
- Distributed by: Apple TV+ (under Apple Original Films)
- Release date: November 5, 2021
- Running time: 115 minutes
- Country: United States
- Language: English

Finch is a 2021 American post-apocalyptic survival film directed by Miguel Sapochnik and written by Craig Luck and Ivor Powell. The film stars Tom Hanks and Caleb Landry Jones. The story follows an aging man named Finch, a survivor in a nearly uninhabitable Earth, who builds and teaches a robot to take care of his dog when he dies.

The film was announced as BIOS in October 2017. Filming took place throughout New Mexico and in Toronto from February to May 2019. The film was scheduled to be released in theaters in the United States by Universal Pictures on October 2, 2020, but was delayed several times due to the COVID-19 pandemic. It was retitled Finch, sold to Apple TV+ (under Apple Original Films), and was released on November 5, 2021. The film received lukewarm reviews from critics, with praise given to Hanks' performance, the visuals, and overall charm, but criticism for its lack of originality and innovation within the post-apocalypse genre.

== Plot ==
Fifteen years have passed since a massive solar flare heavily damaged the ozone layer, turning the planet Earth into a largely uninhabitable wasteland ravaged by extreme weather events while being scorched by the sun's ultraviolet rays, increasing surface temperatures to 150 °F (66 °C; 339 K). One of the few survivors, robotics engineer Finch Weinberg, lives alone with his dog Goodyear and a helper-robot Dewey in an underground St. Louis laboratory once owned by the company he worked for before the cataclysm. Finch only ventures outside wearing a protective suit, to search for supplies.

Dying of an undisclosed ailment (although Finch is seen reading books on radiation poisoning), Finch builds a more advanced humanoid robot companion to take care of his dog once he is gone. Finch feeds it volumes of encyclopedic knowledge, including a manual for training and caring for dogs. Goodyear initially does not trust the robot, who chooses the name "Jeff" for itself.

Finch discovers that a massive storm is approaching St. Louis that will certainly destroy the area and kill him. Finch, Jeff, Dewey, and Goodyear set out in a modified Fleetwood motorhome towards San Francisco. On their journey, Finch attempts to teach Jeff the skills and life lessons he will need to survive and care for Goodyear. Jeff's childlike behavior both amuses and frustrates Finch, but the robot learns quickly, gradually taking over more duties as Finch succumbs further to his illness.

Upon reaching Denver, Finch is bedridden, so Jeff decides to loot an abandoned hospital with Dewey. Finch wakes and perceives the building is a trap, but is unable to reach them before Dewey is unwittingly destroyed by a trapped food source. Finch berates Jeff for his error in judgment, and they flee the city, but later that evening spot an unknown car behind them, which has pursued them from the hospital. Finch panics and overrides Jeff's driving, crashing the motorhome into an underpass with too little clearance, but Jeff uses his superhuman strength to force it under, out of sight. Finch begins to give up hope that he will survive the journey.

As they approach their destination, the UV radiation has dropped below dangerous levels, and there are signs of insect and plant life. Ecstatic, Finch spends an afternoon outside with Jeff, teaching him how to play fetch with Goodyear before quietly dying. Jeff cremates Finch's body in a funeral pyre, mourns, then continues on. They reach the Golden Gate bridge, where they find plentiful vegetation, and messages from survivors who have passed through. Leaving behind a postcard of his own, Jeff and Goodyear set off again to find civilization.

== Cast ==
- Tom Hanks as Finch Weinberg
- Caleb Landry Jones as Jeff
- Seamus as Goodyear

Samira Wiley, Skeet Ulrich, Laura Harrier, and Alexis Raben were all set to appear in the film, but their roles were cut from the final version.

== Production ==
=== Development ===
On October 26, 2017, it was announced that Tom Hanks would star in BIOS, a post-apocalyptic film about a robot who is built by Hanks' ailing character Finch to protect the life of his beloved dog when he dies. Miguel Sapochnik would direct the film, which would be produced by Robert Zemeckis and Kevin Misher, from a spec script by Craig Luck and Ivor Powell. Several major studios were bidding for the rights of the film, with production expected to begin in early 2018. A few days later, it was reported that Amblin Entertainment had purchased the project, with Universal Pictures set to distribute it. In December 2017, the film was revealed to be on that year's "Black List" of most-liked unproduced screenplays.

In January 2019, Caleb Landry Jones joined the cast in a motion capture and voice role as the robot which Finch builds. In March 2019, Samira Wiley was announced as part of the cast, followed by Skeet Ulrich and Laura Harrier in May, but were all absent in the released film.

=== Filming ===
Principal photography began in February 2019, in Albuquerque, New Mexico. Filming also took place in Santa Fe, Shiprock, Los Lunas, Socorro, and the White Sands National Monument, and ended in May 2019. Scenes involving abandoned buildings, streets and highways were shot in Toronto.

=== Deleted extended ending ===
Speaking of cutting the last section of the film, Sapochnik said

"We shot a lot. There is a whole section that ended up on the cutting room floor that was about Jeff finally coming into contact with human beings and how they were not what he expected and certainly not what his father, Finch, had prepared him for. But when we got to post, we were in the edit, there was a point where I realized that I knew we had reached the end of the movie but we still had more story to tell. I tried as much as I could to see if we could accommodate it, but it was a bigger story than we had time to tell in the time we had left to tell it. At some point, we just had to make a choice. To me, I believe the notion of kill your darlings. I loved it. I really liked what we did. It had great actors in it. It had Samira Wiley, it had my wife Alexis Raben, we had Skeet Ulrich, we had a load of people in it. And it was really good. It wasn't the right ending for this chapter of this story. We had to let it go."

== Release ==
In May 2018, the film was scheduled to be released in theaters by Universal Pictures on October 2, 2020. In June 2020, due to the ongoing COVID-19 pandemic shutting down theaters worldwide, it was delayed to April 16, 2021. In January 2021, it was moved to August 13, 2021, and in March, it was moved a week later to August 20.

In May 2021, it was announced that the film had been retitled from BIOS to Finch and bought by Apple TV+ for a release on November 5, 2021, while Universal Pictures Home Entertainment would also retain home entertainment and linear television rights to the film. According to Samba TV, the film was watched in 1.4 million households in its first 30 days of release, including 328,500 over its first two days.

== Reception ==
=== Critical response ===
On the review aggregator website Rotten Tomatoes, 74% of 172 critics' reviews are positive. The website's consensus reads: "Finch may not be the most memorable post-apocalyptic story, but Tom Hanks proves perfectly charming company even after the collapse of civilization." Metacritic assigned the film a weighted average score of 57 out of 100, based on 38 critics, indicating "mixed or average" reviews.

Tomris Laffly of Variety gave the film a positive review: "Despite the bleak backdrop, Finch manages to stay true to the fuzzy ring of its basic idea, delivering a family-friendly movie that is big-hearted, comfortingly traditional and bolstered by a genuine love of dogs." David Rooney of The Hollywood Reporter gave it a mixed review: "There's little that's unpredictable in Miguel Sapochnik's unabashedly sentimental sci-fi road movie, which could almost have been assembled in a robotics lab from the durable parts of countless movies past. But darned if I wasn't misting up in the melancholy climactic scenes." Richard Schertzer of Sportskeeda commented, "Finch proves to be a decent watch but it often gets lost in other science-fiction movies, living in their shadow, rather than doing something new."

=== Accolades ===
Accolades received by Finch (film)
Award	Date of ceremony	Category	Recipient(s)	Result	Ref.
Visual Effects Society Awards	March 8, 2022	Outstanding Animated Character in a Photoreal Feature	Harinarayan Rajeev, Matthias Schoenegger, Simon Allen, Paul Nelson (for Jeff)	Won	
AARP Movies for Grownups Awards	March 18, 2022	Best Buddy Picture	—N/a	Won	
Annie Awards	February 25, 2023	Outstanding Achievement for Character Animation in a Live Action Production	Simon Allen, Harinarayan Rajeev, Paul Nelson and Matthias Schoenegger	Nominated	
