= ImageMovers =

American production company

ImageMovers, L.L.C.
- Formerly: South Side Amusement Company (1984–1997) ImageMovers Digital (2007–2011)
- Type: Private
- Industry: Motion pictures, motion-capture & Computer animation
- Founded: March 1, 1984; 42 years ago (as South Side Amusement Company; in-name only); 1997; 29 years ago (officially registered as ImageMovers, L.L.C.)
- Founder: Robert Zemeckis
- Headquarters: Novato, California, U.S.
- Key people: Robert Zemeckis, Doug Chiang, Steve Starkey, Jack Rapke
- Products: Motion pictures
- Number of employees: 450 (2011)
- Divisions: Compari Entertainment

ImageMovers, L.L.C. (IM) (formerly known as South Side Amusement Company), is an American production company founded by filmmaker Robert Zemeckis in 1984. The company produces CGI animation, motion-capture, live-action films and television shows and is known for producing Zemeckis' films.

From 2007 to 2011, The Walt Disney Company and ImageMovers founded a joint venture animation facility known as ImageMovers Digital which produced two motion-captured CGI-animated films: A Christmas Carol (2009) and Mars Needs Moms (2011) for Walt Disney Pictures, neither of which were financially successful. This eventually caused the company to cut ties with Disney and scrapped both a live-action Yellow Submarine remake and a Roger Rabbit sequel, which were in development at the time.

== History ==
=== South Side Amusement Company (1984–1997) ===
On March 1, 1984, Robert Zemeckis incorporated and founded the company as South Side Amusement Company. The company was in-name only from the beginning. Steve Starkey, who worked with Amblin, while on set at the movies, begin working at the company as business partner in the early 1990s.

In the early 1990s, Zemeckis signed a production deal with Universal Pictures, to produce films under the South Side Amusement Company banner after the success of the Back to the Future movies. There, it is one of the producers of Death Becomes Her, Trespass, The Public Eye and The Frighteners while Zemeckis 1997 film Contact was produced with Warner Bros. Pictures.

The company was one of the members of the group Chicago Five Productions, known for the TV series Johnny Bago.

=== Early years as ImageMovers (1997–2007) ===
In 1997, it was announced that South Side Amusement Company was rebranded as ImageMovers, and hired Creative Artists Agency employee Jack Rapke and producer Steve Starkey (who was a producer on Zemeckis's films since his stint as associate producer on 1988's Who Framed Roger Rabbit) came on board to join the company. It was also announced that ImageMovers signed a non-exclusive feature film deal with DreamWorks Pictures.

In 2001, ImageMovers tried to sign a deal with Warner Bros., but they ultimately failed. After the Warner Bros. deal collapsed, ImageMovers reupped a first-look deal with DreamWorks to produce more films from that time.

ImageMovers's first eight films under the name were What Lies Beneath (with Harrison Ford and Michelle Pfeiffer), Cast Away (with Tom Hanks), Matchstick Men (with Nicolas Cage), The Polar Express (also with Tom Hanks), The Prize Winner of Defiance, Ohio (with Julianne Moore), Last Holiday (with Queen Latifah), Monster House (with Mitchel Musso, Sam Lerner, Spencer Locke, and Steve Buscemi), and Beowulf (with Ray Winstone, Anthony Hopkins, John Malkovich, Robin Wright Penn, and Angelina Jolie).

=== Disney/ImageMovers Digital (2007–2011) ===
ImageMovers Digital
- Type: Joint venture
- Founded: 2007; 19 years ago
- Founders: Robert Zemeckis
- Defunct: 2011; 15 years ago
- Headquarters: Novato, California, U.S.
- Key people: Robert Zemeckis
- Owners: ImageMovers; The Walt Disney Company
- Number of employees: 450

In 2007, ImageMovers collaborated with The Walt Disney Company to establish ImageMovers Digital (IMD). Based in two converted aircraft hangars in Marin County, this joint venture based film focused on producing animated films using motion-capture.

IMD's first film, A Christmas Carol, was released on November 6, 2009. Based on the Charles Dickens novella of the same name, it starred Jim Carrey, Gary Oldman, Bob Hoskins, Robin Wright, and Cary Elwes, each in multiple roles.

On March 12, 2010, Disney announced that IMD would cease operations following the completion of its second film, Mars Needs Moms. This resulted in the layoff of approximately 450 employees. Walt Disney Studios president Alan Bergman said, "Given today's economic realities, we need to find alternative ways to bring creative content to audiences and IMD no longer fits into our business model."

Prior to its shutdown, IMD had several projects in development, including an original film titled Calling All Robots, a remake of Yellow Submarine, a sequel to Who Framed Roger Rabbit, and an adaptation of The Nutcracker. All were scrapped due to the disastrous box-office performance of Mars Needs Moms.

=== Universal Pictures (2011–present) ===
In August 2011, it was announced that ImageMovers had entered a two-year first-look producing deal with Universal Pictures.

== Filmography ==
=== Feature films ===
Year	Film	Director	Co-production/distributor	Budget	Gross
as South Side Amusement Company
1984	Romancing the Stone	Robert Zemeckis	20th Century Fox	$10 million	$115.1 million
1985	Back to the Future	Robert Zemeckis	Universal Pictures; Amblin Entertainment	$19 million	$389.1 million
1988	Who Framed Roger Rabbit	Robert Zemeckis	Touchstone Pictures; Amblin Entertainment	$50.6 million	$329.8 million
1989	Back to the Future Part II	Robert Zemeckis	Universal Pictures; Amblin Entertainment	$40 million	$335.9 million
1990	Back to the Future Part III	Robert Zemeckis	Universal Pictures; Amblin Entertainment	$40 million	$246.1 million
1992	Death Becomes Her	Robert Zemeckis	Universal Pictures	$55 million	$149 million
1992	Trespass	Walter Hill	Universal Pictures	$14 million	$13.7 million
1992	The Public Eye	Howard Franklin	Universal Pictures	$15 million	$3.06 million
1994	Forrest Gump	Robert Zemeckis	Paramount Pictures; The Steve Tisch Company; Wendy Finerman Productions	$55 million	$678.2 million
1996	The Frighteners	Peter Jackson	Universal Pictures; WingNut Films	$26 million	$29.3 million
1997	Contact	Robert Zemeckis	Warner Bros. Pictures	$90 million	$171.1 million
as ImageMovers
2000	What Lies Beneath	Robert Zemeckis	DreamWorks Pictures; 20th Century Fox	$100 million	$291.4 million
2000	Cast Away	Robert Zemeckis	DreamWorks Pictures; 20th Century Fox	$90 million	$429.6 million
2003	Matchstick Men	Ridley Scott	Warner Bros. Pictures; Scott Free Productions	$62 million	$65.6 million
2004	The Polar Express	Robert Zemeckis	Warner Bros. Pictures; Castle Rock Entertainment; Shangri-La Entertainment; Playtone; Golden Mean Productions	$165 million	$310.6 million
2005	The Prize Winner of Defiance, Ohio	Jane Anderson	DreamWorks Pictures	$12 million	$689,028
2006	Last Holiday	Wayne Wang	Paramount Pictures	$45 million	$43.3 million
2006	Monster House	Gil Kenan	Columbia Pictures; Amblin Entertainment	$75 million	$140.2 million
2007	Beowulf	Robert Zemeckis	Paramount Pictures (US); Warner Bros. Pictures (International); Shangri-La Entertainment	$150 million	$196.4 million
2009	A Christmas Carol	Robert Zemeckis	Walt Disney Pictures; as ImageMovers Digital	$175–200 million	$325 million
2011	Mars Needs Moms	Simon Wells	Walt Disney Pictures; as ImageMovers Digital	$150 million	$39.2 million
2011	Real Steel	Shawn Levy	Touchstone Pictures; DreamWorks Pictures; Reliance Entertainment; 21 Laps Entertainment	$110 million	$299.3 million
2012	Flight	Robert Zemeckis	Paramount Pictures; Parkes/MacDonald	$31 million	$161.8 million
2015	The Walk	Robert Zemeckis	TriStar Pictures; TriStar Productions	$35–45 million	$108.4 million
2016	Allied	Robert Zemeckis	Paramount Pictures; GK Films	$85–113 million	$120 million
2018	Welcome to Marwen	Robert Zemeckis	Universal Pictures; DreamWorks Pictures; Perfect World Pictures	$39–50 million	$12.9 million
2020	The Witches	Robert Zemeckis	Warner Bros. Pictures; Esperanto Filmoj; Double Dare You Productions; Necropia Entertainment		$26.9 million
2021	Finch	Miguel Sapochnik	Apple TV+ Amblin Entertainment; Reliance Entertainment; Walden Media; Misher Films		
2022	Pinocchio	Robert Zemeckis	Disney+ Walt Disney Pictures; Depth of Field Studios	$150 million	
2024	Here	Robert Zemeckis	Sony Pictures Releasing; TriStar Pictures; Miramax	$45–50 million	$15.8 million

=== Television series (Compari Entertainment) ===
ImageMovers' first foray into television production was The Borgias, which aired on Showtime from 2011 to 2013. On August 25, 2016, Compari Entertainment, the company's television division, was founded, with NBC's Manifest, which premiered on September 24, 2018, as their first television series.

Year	Series	Creator(s) / Developer(s)	Co-production	Network	Notes
2011–13	The Borgias	Neil Jordan	Myriad Pictures; Amblin Television; Octagon Entertainment; Take 5 Productions; CTV; Bell Media; Showtime Networks	Showtime (United States); Bravo (Canada)	Produced as ImageMovers
2018–23	Manifest	Jeff Rake	Jeff Rake Productions; Universal Television (seasons 1–3); Warner Bros. Television	NBC (seasons 1–3); Netflix (season 4)	
2018	Medal of Honor		Allentown Productions	Netflix	
2019–20	Project Blue Book	David O'Leary	A&E Studios	History	
2019	What/If	Mike Kelley	Page Fright; Atlas Entertainment; Warner Bros. Television	Netflix	Miniseries

=== Unreleased projects ===
==== Yellow Submarine ====
This motion-capture remake of the 1968 Beatles film was developed by Robert Zemeckis. Disney canceled the project due to the box office failure of the Zemeckis-produced motion capture film Mars Needs Moms and aesthetic concerns about the technology. After its cancellation at Disney, Zemeckis then tried to pitch the film to other studios, before eventually losing interest in the project.

==== Calling All Robots ====
On March 26, 2008, Michael Dougherty was set to direct the animated sci-fi adventure film Calling All Robots with Zemeckis producing the film through ImageMovers Digital for Walt Disney Pictures.

==== Roger Rabbit sequel ====
In December 2007, Marshall stated that he was still "open" to the idea, and in April 2009, Zemeckis revealed he was still interested. According to a 2009 MTV News story, Jeffrey Price and Peter S. Seaman were writing a new script for the project, and the animated characters would be in traditional two-dimensional, while the rest would be in motion capture. However, in 2010, Zemeckis said that the sequel would remain hand-drawn animated and live-action sequences will be filmed, just like in the original film, but the lighting effects on the cartoon characters and some of the props that the toons handle will be done digitally. Also in 2010, Hahn, who was the film's original associate producer, confirmed the sequel's development in an interview with Empire. He stated, "Yeah, I couldn't possibly comment. I deny completely, but yeah... if you're a fan, pretty soon you're going to be very, very, very happy." In 2010, Bob Hoskins stated he was interested in the project, reprising his role as Eddie Valiant. However, he retired from acting in 2012 after being diagnosed with Parkinson's disease a year earlier, and died from pneumonia in 2014. Marshall confirmed that the film would be a prequel, similar to earlier drafts, and that the writing was almost complete. During an interview at the premiere of Flight, Zemeckis stated that the sequel was still possible, despite Hoskins' absence, and the script for the sequel was sent to Disney for approval from studio executives.

==== The Nutcracker ====
On November 26, 2009, Zemeckis had signed on to produce and direct the motion capture animated film adaptation of E.T.A. Hoffmann’s The Nutcracker through ImageMovers Digital for Walt Disney Pictures. On July 21, 2016, Universal Pictures revived the adaptation, which may or may not use motion capture, with Zemeckis only set to produce the film and Evan Spiliotopoulos was hired to write the script. There has been no information since.

==== How to Survive a Garden Gnome Attack ====
On April 14, 2011, Zemeckis had signed on to produce and potentially direct the live-action/animated hybrid film adaptation of Chuck Sambuchino's book How to Survive a Garden Gnome Attack along with The Gotham Group and Sony Pictures Animation. In November that year, Chad Damiani and JP Lavin were hired to write the script.

==== Tooned Out ====
On October 29, 2019, at the HBO Max launch event, it was announced that a live-action/animated hybrid TV series featuring Looney Tunes characters to be produced by Warner Bros. Animation, the series was in development after it was announced as Tooned Out, to be released on the then upcoming WarnerMedia streaming service. Zemeckis teamed up with Jared Stern to write the series. There have been no updates since.
