= Contact (1997 American film) =

1997 film by Robert Zemeckis

- Theatrical release poster
- Directed by: Robert Zemeckis
- Screenplay by: James V. Hart; Michael Goldenberg
- Story by: Carl Sagan; Ann Druyan
- Based on: Contact by Carl Sagan
- Produced by: Robert Zemeckis; Steve Starkey
- Starring: Jodie Foster; Matthew McConaughey; James Woods; John Hurt; Tom Skerritt; Angela Bassett
- Cinematography: Don Burgess
- Edited by: Arthur Schmidt
- Music by: Alan Silvestri
- Production company: South Side Amusement Company
- Distributed by: Warner Bros.
- Release date: July 11, 1997
- Running time: 150 minutes
- Country: United States
- Language: English
- Budget: $90 million
- Box office: $171 million

Contact is a 1997 American science fiction drama film co-produced and directed by Robert Zemeckis, based on the 1985 novel by Carl Sagan. It stars Jodie Foster as Dr. Eleanor "Ellie" Arroway, a SETI scientist who finds evidence of extraterrestrial life and is chosen to make first contact. Matthew McConaughey, James Woods, Tom Skerritt, William Fichtner, John Hurt, Angela Bassett, Rob Lowe, Jake Busey, and David Morse co-star. It features the Very Large Array in New Mexico, the Arecibo Observatory in Puerto Rico, the Mir space station, and the Space Coast surrounding Cape Canaveral.

Sagan and his wife, Ann Druyan, began working on Contact in 1979. They wrote a film treatment and set up the project at Warner Bros. with Peter Guber and Lynda Obst as producers. When development stalled, Sagan published Contact as a novel in 1985, and the film reentered development in 1989. Roland Joffé and George Miller planned to direct, but Joffé dropped out in 1993, and Warner Bros. fired Miller in 1995. With Zemeckis as director, filming ran from September 1996 to February 1997, while Sony Pictures Imageworks, Weta, Ltd. and Industrial Light & Magic (ILM) handled the visual and special effects. Sagan died before the film was completed.

Contact was released on July 11, 1997, and received positive reviews, winning the Hugo Award for Best Dramatic Presentation and two Saturn Awards. It grossed $171 million worldwide.

== Plot ==
Astronomer Dr. Ellie Arroway arrives at the SETI program at the Arecibo Observatory in Puerto Rico. The film's prologue reveals that she was encouraged to pursue science by her father, who died in her youth. In the film's present, Arroway studies radio emissions from space to detect signs of intelligent extraterrestrial life. While in Puerto Rico, Arroway meets Christian philosopher Palmer Joss. They have a brief romantic encounter, but Arroway does not contact him again.

David Drumlin, the President's science advisor, cuts SETI funding, deeming it futile. Arroway is furious and instead pursues and receives financial support from S. R. Hadden, a reclusive billionaire industrialist. Arroway re-locates her team to the Very Large Array (VLA) radio dish observatory in New Mexico.

Four years later, Arroway is about to lose access to the VLA satellite dishes. Before being evicted, she discovers a signal containing a sequence of prime numbers originating from the star Vega. Drumlin and the National Security Council, headed by Michael Kitz, arrive and attempt to federalize the facility. Meanwhile, Arroway's team detect a video embedded within the signal: Adolf Hitler's opening address at the 1936 Summer Olympics in Berlin, Germany. The Hitler transmission was the first to penetrate the Earth's ionosphere and reach Vega. A press release at the White House is organised and, following an address from the President, Drumlin appropriates Arroway's discovery as his own and speaks to the press instead of her.

The project is put under federal security and its progress is monitored globally. It is discovered that the signal contains over 63,000 pages of encoded data, though it is undecipherable without a primer. Hadden breaches the government's computer systems and discovers the primer, providing Arroway the means to decode the data. It reveals schematics for what could be a transportation device for a single person. Multiple nations provide funding for the construction at the Kennedy Space Center in Cape Canaveral.

An international panel is assembled to select a candidate to travel in the machine. An American is preferred, and Arroway is a leading candidate until Palmer Joss, a panel member, focuses on her atheism during the interviews. The panel selects Drumlin. During the first tests, a fanatical religious terrorist destroys the machine with a suicide bomb, killing Drumlin and several others. Hadden, terminally ill with cancer, is now residing on the Mir space station. He informs Arroway that the US government and Hadden Industries have secretly built a second machine in Hokkaido, Japan. Arroway, the only remaining American candidate, will use it.

In Japan, Joss and Arroway are reunited. Joss explains he voted against Arroway because he feared she would not survive the experiment. Equipped with multiple recording devices, Arroway enters a pod which is dropped through the massive machine's counter-rotating rings. She seemingly travels through wormholes and observes a radio array–like structure at Vega, signs of civilization on an alien planet, and a celestial event. Arroway finds herself on a beach similar to her childhood drawing of Pensacola, Florida. An alien assuming her father's appearance approaches. He explains that the aliens detected humans' radio emissions and judged it worthy of a first step into the cosmos. Arroway is soon sent back through the wormhole.

Arroway regains consciousness inside the pod. The mission control team reports that the pod fell through the machine into a safety net and that the experiment achieved nothing. Arroway insists she was gone for hours, but her devices recorded only static. A Congressional Committee headed by Kitz speculates the signal and the machine were a hoax perpetrated by Hadden, now deceased. Arroway admits she cannot scientifically prove her experience and requests the committee accept her testimony on faith.

Joss tells the press that he believes Arroway's claim, and they leave the hearing together. Kitz and White House official Rachel Constantine discuss the confidential information. They observe that although Arroway's device recorded only static, it recorded 18 hours of static. Arroway receives ongoing financial support for the SETI program at the VLA.

== Cast ==
- Jodie Foster as Dr. Eleanor "Ellie" Ann Arroway
  - Jena Malone as young Ellie
- Matthew McConaughey as Palmer Joss
- David Morse as Theodore Arroway/the Alien
- Tom Skerritt as Dr. David Drumlin
- James Woods as Michael Kitz
- John Hurt as S. R. Hadden
- William Fichtner as Kent Clarke, a character derived from Kent Cullers
- Angela Bassett as Rachel Constantine
- Jake Busey as Joseph
- Rob Lowe as Richard Rank
- Geoffrey Blake as Fisher
- Max Martini as Willie
- Steven Ford as Major John Russell
- Jay Leno as himself
- Larry King as himself
- Ann Druyan as herself

== Production ==
=== Development ===
The scientist Carl Sagan conceived Contact in 1979. That year, Lynda Obst, one of his closest friends, was hired by the film producer Peter Guber as a studio executive for his production company, Casablanca FilmWorks. She pitched Guber the idea for Contact, and he commissioned a development deal. Sagan and Ann Druyan (who later married) finished the film treatment in November 1980. Druyan said they hoped "to write something that would be a fictional representation of what contact would actually be like, that would convey something of the true grandeur of the universe". They added the science and religion analogies as a metaphor of philosophical and intellectual interest in searching for the truth of both humanity and alien contact.

Sagan incorporated Kip Thorne's study of wormhole space travel. Druyan denied that Arroway was inspired by Jill Tarter, the head of Project Phoenix of the SETI Institute, though Foster met her to research the role. The name Ellie was short for Eleanor, which was taken from Eleanor Roosevelt, whom both Sagan and Druyan adored; Arroway was selected based on both Voltaire's real name (Arouet), and that Ellie "was going to travel like an arrow through the cosmos", according to Druyan. Tarter was a story consultant, and advised on how to portray career struggles of women scientists from the 1950s to 1970s. The writers debated whether Arroway should have a baby at the film's end.

Although Guber was impressed with Sagan and Druyan's treatment, he hired various screenwriters to rewrite the script. New characters were added, including a Native American park ranger turned astronaut. Guber suggested that Arroway have an estranged teenage son, who he believed would add depth to the storyline. Guber said: "Here was a woman consumed with the idea that there was something out there worth listening to, but the one thing she could never make contact with was her own child. To me, that's what the film had to be about." Sagan and Druyan disagreed and did not incorporate the idea.

In 1982, Guber took Contact to Warner Bros. Pictures. As the film's development stalled, Sagan rewrote Contact as a novel, which was published by Simon and Schuster in September 1985. The film adaptation remained in development, and Guber left Warner Bros. in 1989. Guber became the new president of Sony Pictures Entertainment and tried to purchase the film rights from Warner Bros., but the studio refused. In 1989, Obst was hired as a new executive at Warner Bros. and fast-tracked the film by hiring more writers. Roland Joffé was hired to direct, using a screenplay by James V. Hart. Joffé almost commenced pre-production, but dropped out. Obst hired Michael Goldenberg to rewrite the script, who finished his second draft in late 1993. Goldenberg's draft rekindled Warner Bros.' interest in Contact, and asked Robert Zemeckis to direct; he refused in favor of making a film based on the life of Harry Houdini. Zemeckis liked the script, but did not like the ending, which had "the sky open up and these angelic aliens putting on a light show".

In December 1993, Warner Bros. hired George Miller to direct, and Contact entered pre-production. Actresses including Julia Roberts expressed interest in the role of Ellie. Miller considered Uma Thurman before he cast Jodie Foster. He approached Ralph Fiennes to play Palmer Joss, and considered casting Linda Hunt as the US president.

In addition to having aliens put on a laser lighting display around Earth, another version of the Goldenberg scripts had an alien wormhole swallow up the planet, transporting Earth to the center of the galaxy. Miller also asked Goldenberg to rewrite Contact to portray the pope as a key supporting character. Warner Bros. was hoping to have the film ready for release by Christmas 1996, but pre-production lasted longer than expected. Warner Bros. fired Miller, blaming pushed-back start dates, budget concerns, and Miller's insistence that the script needed five more weeks of rewriting.

Zemeckis decided to accept the offer to direct. Warner Bros. granted him total artistic control and final cut privilege. Zemeckis cast Matthew McConaughey as Palmer Joss; McConaughey dropped out of the lead role in The Jackal to take the role. Despite being diagnosed with myelodysplasia in 1994, Sagan remained involved in the production of the film. For the cast and main crew members, he conducted an academic conference that depicted a detailed history of astronomy. The production crew watched Stanley Kubrick's 2001: A Space Odyssey (1968) for inspiration.

=== Filming ===
Concept drawing of early NASA site idea

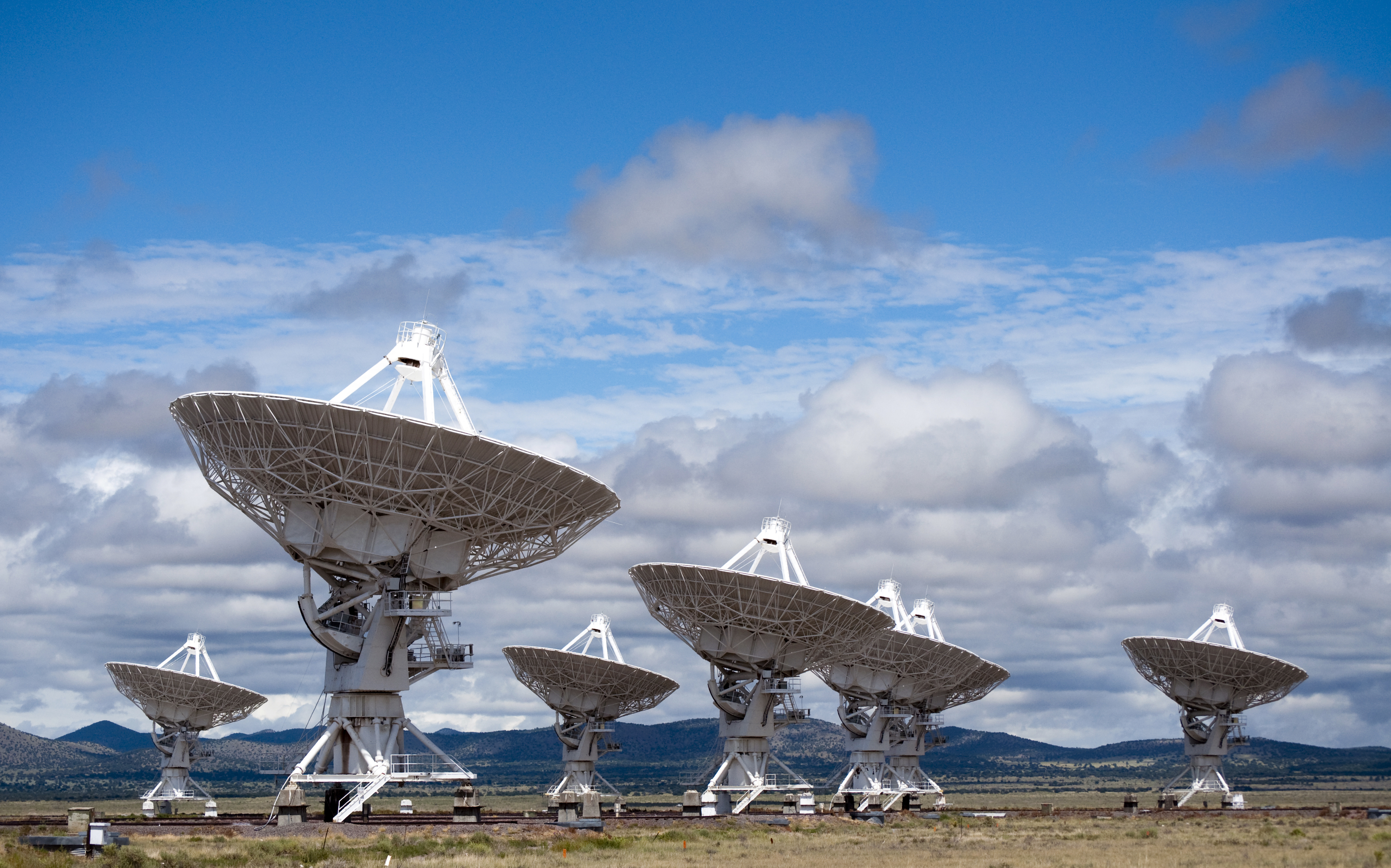
Location filming began in September 1996 at the Very Large Array in New Mexico

Principal photography began on September 24, 1996, and ended on February 28, 1997. The first shooting took place at the Very Large Array (VLA) near Socorro, New Mexico. "Shooting at the VLA was, of course, spectacular but also one of the most difficult aspects of our filming", producer Steve Starkey said. "It is a working facility, so in order for us to accomplish shots for the movie, we had to negotiate with the National Science Foundation for 'dish control' in order to move the dishes in the direction we needed to effect the most dramatic shot for the story." After arduous first weeks of location shooting in New Mexico and Arizona, production for Contact returned to Los Angeles for five months' worth of location and sound stage shooting that used a total of nine soundstages at Warner Hollywood Studios in West Hollywood, and Culver Studios. The art department created more than 25 sets.

In an attempt to create a sense of realism for the storyline, principal CNN news outlet commentators were scripted into Contact. More than 25 news reporters from CNN had roles in the film, and the CNN programs Larry King Live and Crossfire were also included. Ann Druyan makes a cameo appearance as herself, debating with Rob Lowe's character, Richard Rank, on Crossfire. In January 1997, second unit filming, directed by producer Steve Starkey took place for one week at the Arecibo Observatory in Puerto Rico.

Other second-unit work took place in Fiji, Saint John, US Virgin Islands and Newfoundland, Canada. Also essential to the production were a host of technical consultants from the SETI Institute, the California Institute of Technology, the VLA and a former White House staff member to consult on Washington, D.C., and government protocol issues. Sagan visited the set a number of times, where he also helped with last-minute rewrites. Filming was briefly delayed with the news of his death on December 20, 1996. Contact was dedicated to Sagan: "For Carl" appears on the screen at the fade.

Cinematographer Don Burgess shot the film in anamorphic format using Panavision cameras, as well as using large-format 65 mm and VistaVision for visual and special effects shots. The sound designers used Pro Tools software for the sound mixing, which was done at Skywalker Sound.

=== Visual effects ===
The second Machine in operation at Hokkaidō, Japan

The visual effects sequences were designed by eight VFX companies, including Sony Pictures Imageworks (SPI), Weta Digital, Industrial Light & Magic (ILM), Warner Digital, and Effects Associates, with Pixar's RenderMan used for CGI rendering. Weta Digital, in particular, was responsible for designing the wormhole sequence. Foster found working with blue screen technology for the first time difficult: "It was a blue room. Blue walls, blue roof. It was just blue, blue, blue. And I was rotated on a Lazy Susan with the camera moving on a computerized arm. It was really tough."

News footage of Bill Clinton was digitally altered to make it appear as if he is speaking about alien contact. Zemeckis had approached Sidney Poitier to play the president, who turned the role down in favor of The Jackal. Shortly afterwards, Clinton gave a speech about the Martian meteorite fragment Allan Hills 84001, which was used in Contact. Zemeckis said: "I swear to God it was like it was scripted for this movie. When he said the line 'We will continue to listen closely to what it has to say', I almost died. I stood there with my mouth hanging open." Digital color correction was used to solve continuity errors during the location shooting at the Very Large Array in New Mexico.

The opening scene is a three-minute CGI sequence, beginning with a view of Earth from high in the exosphere and listening to numerous radio broadcasts emitting from the planet. The camera zooms backward, passing the Moon, Mars, and other features of the Solar System, then to the Oort cloud, interstellar space, the Local Bubble, the Milky Way, other galaxies of the Local Group, and eventually into deep space. As this occurs, the radio signals start to drop out and reflect older programming, representing the distance these signals would have traveled at the speed of light, eventually becoming silent as the distance becomes much greater. The sequence eventually resolves into the iris of young Ellie's eye as she is listening on her amateur radio base station. The scale-view shot of the entire universe was inspired by the short documentary film Powers of Ten (1977). At the time, it was the longest continuous computer-generated sequence in a live-action film, eventually surpassed by the opening of The Day After Tomorrow (2004).

One sequence, with young Ellie running upstairs to try to retrieve her father's medicine, appears to have Ellie running just behind a camera as they move into the bathroom, but the shot resolves to show that this was part of the medicine cabinet mirror's reflection, pulling back to have Ellie open it. It is noted as one of the film's most impressive visual effects due to the seamlessness of the transition. According to Carin-Anne Strohmaier, first assistant film editor, the shot was created through three different plates and manipulated in CGI to create the effect: one plate was from the cameraman leading Ellie, the second of Ellie opening the cabinet door (which was a blue screen instead of a mirror), and the third of the reflection of the photograph of Ellie and her father when the door closes.

In the sequence with the death of Ellie's father, they planned to use an effect similar to bullet time from The Matrix to show him stopped in time as he died. As the movie was filmed, they found the approach did not fit the casting or the direction the film was going. They decided it would be most effective to create something distressing but with Ellie's father absent from the shot, leading to the development of the mirror sequence.

The decoding of the extraterrestrial message, with its architectural drawings of the machine, was created by Ken Ralston and Sony Pictures Imageworks. It was Zemeckis's and Ralston's sixth film collaboration. Imageworks created more than 350 visual effect shots, using a combination of model and miniature shots and digital graphics. On designing the Machine, Zemeckis said, "The Machine in Sagan's novel was somewhat vague, which is fine for a book. In a movie, though, if you're going to build a giant physical structure of alien design, you have to make it believable... It had to be huge, so that the audience would feel like it was bigger than man should be tinkering with. It had to look absolutely real." The machine was designed by concept artist Steve Burg, reusing a design he created as a "time-displacement device" for an unused scene in Terminator 2.

Early conceptual designs of the Pod were based, as in the novel, on one of the primary shapes in geometry: a dodecahedron, or a twelve-sided body. Eventually it was modified to a spherical capsule that encased the traveler, with a dodecahedron surrounding the sphere. Zemeckis and the production crew also made several visits to the Kennedy Space Center at Merritt Island adjacent to Cape Canaveral, where officials gave them access to sites off-limits to most visitors. Filmmakers were also brought onto Launch Complex 39 before the launch of the Space Shuttle, where they studied the mechanics of the elevator, gantry area and loading arm for the design of the Machine's surrounding supports and gantry. Once the concept met with the filmmakers' approval, physical construction began on the sets for the Pod, elevator interior and gantry, which took almost four months. The rest of the effects were compiled digitally by Imageworks.

The climactic scene depicting the mysterious beach near the galactic core where Arroway makes contact, in particular, called for major visual innovations. The goal was an idyllic seashore with a sky blazing with stars that might exist near the core of the galaxy. Ralston said that "the thought was that this beach would have a heightened reality. One that might make the everyday world seem like a vague daydream." To keep the question alive whether any of it was real in Arroway's mind, elements such as ocean waves running in reverse and palm tree shadows swaying with sped-up motion were applied. The Hitler newsreel also required digital manipulation.

=== Music ===
Contact: Music from the Motion Picture

Soundtrack album by Alan Silvestri
- Released: August 19, 1997
- Label: Warner Bros. Records

The original score was composed and conducted by Alan Silvestri, most of which was released on August 19, 1997, by Warner Bros. Records. The full score is approximately an hour long, 44 minutes of which is on the CD, including every major cue. The CD track entitled "Good to Go" features a slightly different opening—a brief brass motif that is not in the film—but all other cues are identical in orchestration to the mix in the film.

The Region 2 Special Edition DVD release contains a 5.1 music score track, which presents the complete score (this feature, as with many isolated scores, is not mentioned in most product descriptions of the DVD).

== Themes ==
Contact often suggests that cultural conflicts between religion and science would be brought to the fore by the apparent contact with aliens that occurs in the film. A point of discussion is the existence of God, with several different positions being portrayed. A description of an emotionally intense experience by Palmer Joss, which he describes as seeing God, is met by Arroway's suggestion that "some part of [him] needed to have it"—that it was a significant personal experience but indicative of nothing greater. Joss compares his certainty that God exists to Arroway's certainty that she loved her deceased father, despite her being unable to prove it.

Contact depicts intense debate occurring as a result of the apparent contact with aliens. Many clips of well-known debate shows such as Crossfire and Larry King Live are shown, with participants discussing the implications of the message, asking whether it is proof of the existence of alien life or of God, and whether science is encroaching upon religious ground by, as one believer puts it, "talking to your god for you". The head of a religious organization casts doubt on the morality of building the machine, noting: "We don't even know whether [the aliens] believe in God." The first machine is ultimately destroyed by a Christian extremist, in the belief that building it was detrimental to humankind.

Although the revelation at the end of the film that Arroway's recording device recorded approximately 18 hours of noise is arguably conclusive proof of the fact of—if not the experience of—her "journey", several coincidences and indications throughout the film cast doubt on its authenticity. Zemeckis said: "The point of the movie is for there always to be a certain amount of doubt [as to whether the aliens were real]." These indications consist mostly of visual cues during the "journey" that echo Ellie's experiences earlier in the film (which Ellie believed to be the result of the aliens "downloading [her] thoughts and memories"), but the timing of the message's arrival and its eventual decoding are also coincidental: the message was first received shortly before Arroway and her team were to be ejected from the VLA facility and was successfully decoded only by S. R. Hadden (Arroway's only sponsor, who was close to death from cancer) after weeks of failed attempts by the team at the VLA.

At the end of the film, Arroway is put into a position that she had traditionally viewed with skepticism and contempt: that of believing something with complete certainty, despite being unable to prove it in the face of not only widespread incredulity and skepticism (which she admits that as a scientist she would normally share) but also evidence apparently to the contrary.

Zemeckis stated that he intended the message of the film to be that science and religion can coexist rather than being opposing camps, as shown by the coupling of scientist Arroway with the religious Joss, as well as his acceptance that the "journey" indeed took place. This, and scattered references throughout the film, posit that science and religion are not nominally incompatible: one interviewer, after asking Arroway whether the construction of the machine—despite not knowing what will happen when it is activated—is too dangerous, suggests that it is being built on the "faith" that the alien designers, as Arroway puts it, "know what they're doing".

== Release ==
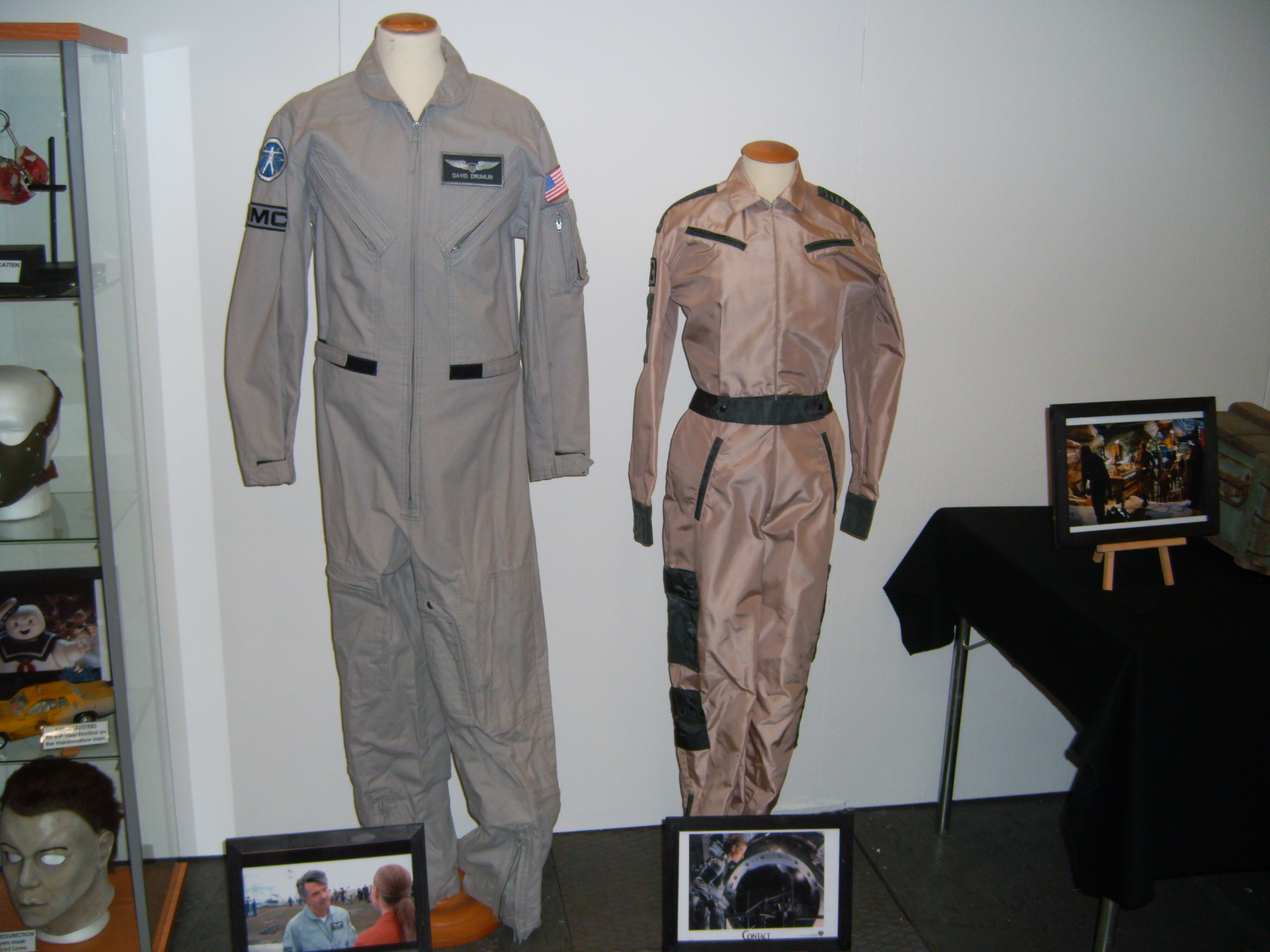
Uniforms from the film at "The Scandinavian Sci-Fi, Game & Film Convention" held at Stockholm International Fairs in 2011

Contact's release in July 1997 rekindled public interest in Sagan's 1985 novel. The book remained on The New York Times Best Seller list from July 27 to September 21, 1997.

Contact premiered on July 1, 1997, at the Village Theater in Los Angeles, California. It was released in the United States and Canada on July 11, 1997, in 1,923 theaters, earning $20,584,908 in its opening weekend, ranking in second place behind Men in Black. The film would hold the record for having Jodie Foster's highest opening weekend until Panic Room replaced it in 2002. It eventually grossed $101 million in North America and $70 million internationally, reaching a total of $171 million worldwide.

Contact was released on LaserDisc, VHS and DVD in December 1997. Among the special features are three audio commentaries: by director Zemeckis and producer Starkey, by visual effects supervisors Ken Ralston and Stephen Rosenbaum, and by star Jodie Foster. Contact was released on Blu-ray Disc on October 6, 2009.

== Critical reception ==
On Rotten Tomatoes, it has a rating of 69% based on reviews 68 critics, with an average score of 7.6/10. The critical consensus reads, "Contact elucidates stirring scientific concepts and theological inquiry at the expense of satisfying storytelling, making for a brainy blockbuster that engages with its ideas, if not its characters." Metacritic calculated an average score of 62 out of 100, based on 23 reviews, indicating "generally favorable" reviews. Audiences polled by CinemaScore gave the film an average grade of "A−" on an A+ to F scale.

Roger Ebert gave Contact three and a half out of four and wrote that it "tells the smartest and most absorbing story about extraterrestrial intelligence since Close Encounters of the Third Kind (1977). Movies like Contact help explain why movies like Independence Day leave me feeling empty and unsatisfied." On December 21, 2011, Ebert added Contact to his "Great Movies" collection. Kenneth Turan of the Los Angeles Times said Contact carried a more philosophical portrait of the science fiction genre than did other films, but would still "satisfy the cravings of the general public who simply want to be entertained".

The critic James Berardinelli said that Contact is "one of 1997's finest motion pictures, and is a forceful reminder that Hollywood is still capable of making magic". Berardinelli likened its awe and spectacle to Stanley Kubrick's 2001: A Space Odyssey, adding that "If Contact falls short in any area, it's an inability to fully develop all of its many subplots..." Mick LaSalle of the San Francisco Chronicle largely enjoyed the first 90 minutes of Contact but felt that Zemeckis was too obsessed with visual effects rather than cohesive storytelling for the pivotal climax. Rita Kempley, writing in The Washington Post, did not like the premise, which she described as "a preachy debate between sanctity and science".

=== Awards ===
Association	Category	Recipient	Results
20/20 Awards	Best Actress	Jodie Foster	Nominated
20/20 Awards	Best Adapted Screenplay	James V. Hart & Michael Goldenberg	Nominated
20/20 Awards	Best Visual Effects		Nominated
Academy Awards	Best Sound	Randy Thom; Tom Johnson; Dennis S. Sands; William B. Kaplan	Nominated
Annie Awards	Best Individual Achievement: Effects Animation	Jay Redd	Nominated
ASCAP Film and Television Music Awards	Top Box Office Films	Alan Silvestri	Won
Blockbuster Entertainment Awards	Favorite Actor – Drama	Matthew McConaughey	Nominated
Blockbuster Entertainment Awards	Favorite Actress – Drama	Jodie Foster	Nominated
Blockbuster Entertainment Awards	Favorite Supporting Actor – Drama	Tom Skerritt	Nominated
Chicago Film Critics Association Awards	Best Actress	Jodie Foster	Nominated
Cinema Audio Society Awards	Outstanding Achievement in Sound Mixing for Feature Films	Randy Thom; Tom Johnson; Dennis S. Sands; William B. Kaplan	Nominated
Dallas-Fort Worth Film Critics Association Awards	Best Picture	—N/a	Nominated
Golden Globe Awards	Best Lead Actress in a Motion Picture – Drama	Jodie Foster	Nominated
Hugo Awards	Best Dramatic Presentation	Robert Zemeckis; James V. Hart; Michael Goldenberg; Carl Sagan; Ann Druyan	Won
Humanitas Prize Awards	Feature Film Category	James V. Hart & Michael Goldenberg	Nominated
International Monitor Awards	Theatrical Releases – Electronic Visual Effects	Ken Ralston; Stephen Rosenbaum; Jerome Chen; Jay Redd; Sheena Duggal; David Jones; Debbie Denise	Won
Jupiter Awards	Best International Actress	Jodie Foster	Won
Motion Picture Sound Editors Awards	Best Sound Editing – Sound Effects & Foley	—N/a	Nominated
NAACP Image Awards	Outstanding Supporting Actress in a Motion Picture	Angela Bassett	Nominated
Online Film Critics Society Awards	Top Ten Films of the Year	—N/a	Won
Rembrandt Awards	Best Actress	Jodie Foster	Won
Santa Barbara International Film Festival Awards	Modern Master Award	Jodie Foster	Won
Satellite Awards	Best Visual Effects	Ken Ralston	Won
Satellite Awards	Best Cinematography	Don Burgess	Nominated
Saturn Awards	Best Science Fiction Film		Nominated
Saturn Awards	Best Director	Robert Zemeckis	Nominated
Saturn Awards	Best Writer	James V. Hart & Michael Goldenberg	Nominated
Saturn Awards	Best Actress	Jodie Foster	Won
Saturn Awards	Best Performance by a Younger Actor/Actress	Jena Malone	Won
Saturn Awards	Best Music	Alan Silverstri	Nominated
Saturn Awards	Best Special Effects	Ken Ralston; Stephen Rosenbaum; Jerome Chen; Mark Holmes	Nominated
World Animation Celebration Awards	Best Use of Animation as a Special FX in a Theatrical	—N/a	Won

== Reactions ==
=== Bill Clinton ===
In 1984, a meteorite called Allan Hills 84001, thought to be from Mars, was found in Antarctica. Twelve years later, an article by NASA scientist David S. McKay was published in the journal Science, proposing that the meteorite might contain evidence for microscopic fossils of Martian bacteria (later, a disputed interpretation). The announcement made headlines around the world, and the following day, on August 7, 1996, during a press conference about the news, the President of the United States, Bill Clinton, made remarks that were in places sufficiently generic in nature to allow fragments of his videotaped statement to be included in Contact, implying that Clinton was ostensibly speaking about contact with extraterrestrial life, congruent with the film's story:

Good afternoon. I'm glad to be joined by my science and technology adviser ...[words cut by film editors]... This is the product of years of exploration ...[words cut]... by some of the world's most distinguished scientists. Like all discoveries, this one will and should continue to be reviewed, examined, and scrutinized. It must be confirmed by other scientists. But clearly, the fact that something of this magnitude is being explored is another vindication ...[film scene performed over recording, with dialogue obscuring Clinton's remarks and creating a gap]... If this discovery is confirmed, it will surely be one of the most stunning insights into our universe that science has ever uncovered. Its implications are as far reaching and awe inspiring as can be imagined. Even as it promises answers to some of our oldest questions, it poses still others even more fundamental. We will continue to listen closely to what it has to say as we continue the search for answers and for knowledge that is as old as humanity itself but essential to our people's future. Thank you.

Later in the film, a separate fragment of generic remarks by President Clinton, speaking about Saddam Hussein and Iraq at a different press conference in October 1994, was lifted out of context and inserted into Contact:

I would encourage you not to inflame this situation beyond the facts. Let us deal with this on the facts. We are monitoring what has actually happened.

On July 14, 1997, three days after the film opened in the United States, Warner Bros. received a letter from White House Counsel Charles Ruff protesting against the use of Clinton's digitally-composited appearance. The letter made no demands, but called the duration and manner of Clinton's appearance "inappropriate". No legal action was planned; the White House Counsel simply wanted to send a message to Hollywood to avoid unauthorized uses of the President's image. Zemeckis was reminded that official White House policy "prohibits the use of the President in any way ... (that) implies a direct ... connection between the President and a commercial product or service".

A Warner Bros. spokeswoman explained: "We feel we have been completely frank and upfront with the White House on this issue. They saw scripts, they were notified when the film was completed, they were sent a print well in advance of the film's July 11 opening, and we have confirmation that a print was received there July 2." However, Warner Bros. did concede that they never pursued or received formal release from the White House for the use of Clinton's image. While the Counsel commented that parody and satire are protected under the First Amendment, press secretary Mike McCurry believed that "there is a difference when the President's image, which is his alone to control, is used in a way that would lead the viewer to believe he has said something he really didn't say".

=== CNN ===
Shortly after the White House's complaint, CNN chairman, president, and CEO Tom Johnson announced he believed that in hindsight it was a mistake to allow 13 members of CNN's on-air staff (including John Holliman, Larry King and Bernard Shaw) to appear in the film, even though both CNN and Warner Bros. were owned by Time Warner. Johnson added that, for Contact, the CNN presence "creates the impression that we're manipulated by Time Warner, and it blurs the line". CNN then changed their policies for future films, which now require potential appearances to be cleared through their ethics group.

=== NASA ===
The scene where the NASA scientists give Arroway the "cyanide pill" caused some controversy during production and when the film came out. Gerald D. Griffin, the film's NASA advisor, insisted that NASA has never given any astronaut a cyanide pill "just in case", and that if an astronaut truly wished to commit suicide in space, all they would have to do is cut off their oxygen supply. However, Sagan insisted that NASA had given cyanide pills to every astronaut on every mission. Zemeckis left the suicide pill in the film to add suspense and because it was consistent with Sagan's beliefs and vision of the film.

Along with being NASA Technical Consultant for the project, Griffin had a cameo in the role of "Dynamics" in Mission Control. He was a technical advisor for Ron Howard's 1995 film Apollo 13. While working for NASA during the Apollo Program, he was a flight director for that mission, among others, and in the 1980s was director of the Johnson Space Center.

=== SETI ===
In 2011, Seti.org published a review of the film where they gave a side-by-side chart of a few relevant details from the film, and how they differed from reality. One example being that, despite having 27 radio telescopes, the VLA is actually smaller and less sensitive than the Arecibo Observatory—making Arecibo a better location for SETI work, if possibly a less photogenic filming location than the VLA. Despite these inconsistencies, they maintained that "Contact is indescribably more accurate in its depiction of SETI than any Hollywood film in history".

== Lawsuits ==
Director George Miller, who had developed Contact with Warner Bros. before Zemeckis' hiring, unsuccessfully sued the studio over breach of contract policies. During filming on December 28, 1996, filmmaker Francis Ford Coppola filed a lawsuit against Warner Bros. and Sagan, who had died the previous week. Coppola claimed that Sagan's novel was based on a story the pair had developed for a television special back in 1975, titled First Contact. Under their development agreement, Coppola and Sagan were to split proceeds from the project, as well as from any novel Sagan would write, with American Zoetrope and the Children's Television Workshop. The TV program was never produced, but in 1985, Simon and Schuster published Contact, and Warner moved forward with development of a film adaptation. Coppola sought at least $250,000 in compensatory damages and an injunction against production or distribution of the film.

In February 1998, Los Angeles Superior Court Judge Ricardo Torres dismissed Coppola's claim. Although Torres agreed that Sagan violated some terms of the contract, he explained that Coppola waited too long to file his lawsuit, and that the contract might not be enforceable as it was written. Coppola then appealed his suit, taking it to the California Courts of Appeal (CCA). In April 2000, the CCA dismissed his suit, finding that Coppola's claims were barred because they were brought too late. The court noted that it was not until 1994 that the filmmaker thought about suing over Contact.

== See also ==
- "The Borderland" (The Outer Limits episode)
- List of films featuring extraterrestrials
- List of films featuring space stations
- Wow! signal – 1977 radio signal detected as part of SETI
