= Jerome Chen (visual effects supervisor) =

Chinese-American visual effects artist

- Born: April 18, 1963 (age 63)
- Occupations: Visual effects supervisor and director
- Years active: 1992–present

Jerome Chen is a Chinese American visual effects supervisor and director. He is a founding member of Sony Pictures Imageworks.

Chen was the visual effects supervisor on The Amazing Spider-Man 1 & 2, as well as Spider-Man: Brand New Day (2026).

He was nominated for an Academy Award for Best Visual Effects at the 72nd Academy Awards for his work on Stuart Little, shared with John Dykstra, Henry F. Anderson III, and Eric Allard.

He also shares several patents for facial/body motion capture and interactive camera technologies.

Beyond live action, Chen also directed two episodes for Netflix’s animated anthology series Love, Death & Robots (“Lucky 13” and “In Vaulted Halls Entombed”).

== Partial filmography ==
- James and the Giant Peach (1996) (computer graphics supervisor)
- Contact (1996) (computer graphics supervisor)
- Stuart Little (1999) (visual effects supervisor)
- Stuart Little 2 (2002) (visual effects supervisor)
- The Polar Express (2004) (visual effects supervisor)
- Beowulf (2007) (senior visual effects supervisor)
- The Amazing Spider-Man (2012) (visual effects supervisor)
- The Amazing Spider-Man 2 (2014) (visual effects supervisor)
- Fury (2014) (visual effects supervisor)
- Suicide Squad (2016) (visual effects supervisor)
- Jumanji: Welcome to the Jungle (2017) (visual effects supervisor)
- Men in Black: International (2019) (visual effects supervisor)
- Love, Death, & Robots: Lucky 13 (2019) (director)
- Love, Death, & Robots: In Vaulted Halls Entombed (2022) (director)
- Spider-Man: Brand New Day (2026) (visual effect supervisor)
