= What Lies Beneath =

2000 film by Robert Zemeckis

- Theatrical release poster
- Directed by: Robert Zemeckis
- Screenplay by: Clark Gregg
- Story by: Sarah Kernochan; Clark Gregg
- Produced by: Steve Starkey; Robert Zemeckis; Jack Rapke
- Starring: Harrison Ford; Michelle Pfeiffer; Diana Scarwid
- Cinematography: Don Burgess
- Edited by: Arthur Schmidt
- Music by: Alan Silvestri
- Production company: ImageMovers
- Distributed by: DreamWorks Pictures (United States and Canada); 20th Century Fox (international)
- Release date: July 21, 2000
- Running time: 130 minutes
- Country: United States
- Language: English
- Budget: $100 million
- Box office: $291.4 million

What Lies Beneath is a 2000 American supernatural horror thriller film directed by Robert Zemeckis and starring Harrison Ford and Michelle Pfeiffer, with supporting performances from Diana Scarwid, Miranda Otto, James Remar, Joe Morton, and Amber Valletta. Its plot focuses on a woman who comes to suspect that the lakeside Vermont home she shares with her husband is haunted by a female ghost.

The original story for What Lies Beneath was written by Sarah Kernochan, inspired by a real paranormal experience she had. The project began development around 1998, with Clark Gregg making several alterations to Kernochan's original treatment, which he eventually developed into a feature-length screenplay. Principal photography took place on location in Vermont and on soundstages in Los Angeles, while director Zemeckis was taking a hiatus from filming his concurrent project, Cast Away (2000). It was the first film produced by Zemeckis' production company ImageMovers following its rebrand from South Side Amusement Company.

What Lies Beneath was theatrically released in North America by DreamWorks Pictures and internationally by 20th Century Fox on July 21, 2000. While it received mixed reviews from critics, who praised Pfeiffer's performance and criticized Gregg's script, the film was a box office success, grossing US$291 million worldwide and becoming the tenth highest-grossing film of the year.

The film was nominated for the Saturn Award for Best Horror Film at the 27th Saturn Awards, in addition to nominations for Best Director (for Zemeckis) and Best Actress (for Pfeiffer). At the 7th Blockbuster Entertainment Awards, Ford and Pfeiffer won Favorite Actor – Suspense and Favorite Actress – Suspense, respectively, and Scarwid was nominated for Favorite Supporting Actress – Suspense.

== Plot ==
Former cellist Claire Spencer and her husband, Norman, a scientist and professor, live at their lakeside home in Vermont. Their relationship is strained, particularly after Claire's daughter and Norman's stepdaughter, Caitlin, leaves for college. Adding to the tension, it has been a year since Claire suffered a serious car accident.

Claire observes that their new neighbors, Mary and Warren Feur, have a volatile relationship. When Mary disappears for several days, Claire suspects that Warren may have killed her. She starts experiencing unsettling occurrences: she believes she sees a woman's body in the lake, their front door opens on its own, and she senses an eerie presence. When a framed newspaper article about Norman falls from his desk and shatters, Claire discovers an unusual key. Soon after, she finds the bathtub mysteriously filled with water and sees a woman's reflection in it.

Norman is dismissive of Claire's fear that their house is haunted and suggests she see a therapist to deal with her mounting anxiety. During a session, Claire mentions seeing a woman who bears a striking resemblance to her. Claire and her friend Jody hold a séance. Shortly after, she again finds the bathtub filled with water. A message reading "You're next" briefly, then "you know" appears on the foggy bathroom mirror, and her computer types the initials "MEF." Convinced that Mary's ghost is haunting her, Claire confronts Warren. Mary appears next to him, alive and well, shocking Claire.

At a party, a friend reminds Claire of an argument she had with Norman a year earlier and asks if she is okay. When Claire returns home, the newspaper clipping falls again, and she notices a story on the back about a missing woman named Madison Elizabeth Frank, who bears a striking resemblance to her. Claire visits Madison's mother and secretly takes a lock of her hair.

Claire attempts to summon Madison's ghost. She becomes possessed by Madison's vengeful spirit and aggressively seduces Norman, shocking him by speaking in Madison's voice. The possession ends when she drops Madison's lock of hair. This triggers a repressed memory: Norman had an affair with Madison, one of his students, during a rough patch in their marriage. Claire had forgotten about it due to her car accident.

Shaken, Claire spends the night at Jody's house. Jody confesses that she once saw Norman arguing with a woman at a café in the nearby town of Adamant a year earlier. Returning home, Claire finds Norman unconscious in the bathtub, an electric hairdryer nearby. He assures her it was an accident. He admits that Madison had confronted him when he ended their affair but insists he did not kill her. Later, standing by the lake, Claire is pulled into the water by an unseen force. While submerged, she sees a jewelry box matching the necklace Madison wore in the photo. Norman pulls her out of the water, and they burn Madison's lock of hair.

Though she and Norman seem to reconcile, Claire's suspicions return when she suggests visiting Adamant, and Norman claims not to know the town. Claire visits Adamant alone and recognizes the same necklace and jewelry box in a shop window. She recovers the box from the lake and unlocks it with the key from Norman's office, finding Madison's necklace inside. When she confronts Norman, he claims that Madison killed herself and that, in a panic, he pushed her car into the lake with her body inside. He calls the police, per her insistence. While he is getting ready, she discovers that he faked the call. Suddenly, he appears and attacks Claire, paralyzing her with halothane. Norman confesses that he murdered Madison when she threatened to expose their affair to the dean. He mocks Claire, saying he initially assumed she made up the ghost story to subconsciously reveal the truth but then realized she actually believed it. He places Claire in the bathtub, filling it with water to stage her suicide. As he removes Madison's necklace from Claire's neck, her face briefly transforms into Madison's corpse. Startled, Norman stumbles backward, smashing his head against the sink and knocking himself out.

As the drug begins to wear off, Claire unplugs the drain and escapes drowning. As she tries to grab the phone, Norman regains consciousness and chases her. Claire flees in his truck with their boat attached, but Norman climbs inside and attacks her, causing the vehicle to crash into the lake. Trapped underwater, Norman tries to drown Claire. Suddenly, the wreck of Madison's car submerged beneath them shifts. A part of the boat impales the roof, dislodging Madison's decayed corpse. Madison's body floats up and appears to come to life, grabbing him. Claire escapes while Norman drowns. Madison's corpse returns to its lifeless state, drifting into the depths as her necklace slips from Norman's hand.

That winter, Claire visits a cemetery and places a red rose on Madison's gravestone.

== Cast ==
- Michelle Pfeiffer as Claire Spencer
- Harrison Ford as Dr. Norman Spencer
- Diana Scarwid as Jody
- Joe Morton as Dr. Drayton
- James Remar as Warren Feur
- Miranda Otto as Mary Feur
- Wendy Crewson as Elena
- Ray Baker as Dr. Stan Powell
- Micole Mercurio as Mrs. Frank
- Amber Valletta as Madison Elizabeth Frank
- Katharine Towne as Caitlin Spencer
- Sloane Shelton as Mrs. Templeton

== Production ==
=== Development ===
Documentary filmmaker Sarah Kernochan had adapted a personal experience with the paranormal as a script treatment featuring a retirement aged couple dealing with restless but compassionate spirits. DreamWorks commissioned a rewrite from actor-writer Clark Gregg. This script was delivered in 1998 by Steven Spielberg to his director friend Robert Zemeckis, who had signed a deal for DreamWorks to distribute the films of newly founded production company ImageMovers, and announced interest in doing a thriller film. "I kept second-guessing the main character, and that kept me turning the page which when that happens, I have to consider it," Zemeckis recalled. "Secondly, there was an intelligence and kind of elegance to the writing and drawing of the characters. And there was an undercurrent of creepiness."

As Gregg had to remain with production for rewrites, he had to decline an offer to read for a major role in Sports Night; Aaron Sorkin later created a minor role in the final episodes of the series for Gregg.

Kernochan estimated that about "seventy-five percent" of her original screenplay was reworked by Gregg:

That whole ghost-taking-her-revenge plot wasn't there. I wrote it for Steven Spielberg who has a very different taste than Robert Zemeckis who eventually made it. Steven approached me, wanting to do a story about a ghost who was an ordinary human being. The lead character was a woman who has just sent her kids off to college. She's an empty nester. And the ghost that starts manifesting in her house, fills that empty space. He wanted it to be about the wonderment of discovery, of contact. Really what he wanted was Close Encounters of the Third Kind, but in an intimate domestic setting. My script succeeded in that, but when Steven read it, he realized it didn't feel like a Spielberg movie. He didn't know what he wanted me to do, because I'd already done what he asked. So, he gave it to Zemeckis, with whom his company had a deal.

=== Casting ===
Harrison Ford and Pfeiffer were Zemeckis' first and only choices for the lead roles. Ford signed on to star in the film in the summer of 1998, even agreeing to clear room in his schedule for the project. His casting involved dropping out of the role in The Perfect Storm. The film marks a career highlight for Ford, as he plays against type by portraying a more villainous take of his established everyman persona. Pfeiffer followed soon after as DreamWorks started to negotiate with 20th Century Fox regarding the film's distribution. Fox agreed to distribute both What Lies Beneath and Zemeckis' other project Cast Away, with the thriller having DreamWorks doing the domestic distribution and Fox the international one.

According to actress Amber Valletta, her character of Madison was not originally written to be a lookalike to Pfeiffer's, but this element was incorporated into the story after her casting because of the two actresses' shared resemblance.

=== Filming ===
What Lies Beneath was filmed while production of Cast Away took a hiatus to allow Tom Hanks to lose weight and grow a beard. The majority of the film's crew was the same crew hired for Cast Away: "You can't afford to hold a crew for a year so I took the same crew and rolled them onto What Lies Beneath and then rolled them right back onto Cast Away," said Zemeckis. "We were paying people to wait for Tom [Hanks] to lose weight, so we made a movie in-between. We wrapped Cast Away in April, started Beneath in August, wrapped that in December then went back to Fiji in March so it worked out."

Principal photography began on August 23, 1999, in Addison, Vermont. Exteriors of the homes featured in the film were constructed on location, while interiors were shot on soundstages in Los Angeles.

Pfeiffer stated that shooting the underwater scenes were particularly difficult for her due to her fear of water: "It was awful. I took some scuba lessons because I was really uncomfortable in the water. Being in the bathtub was the worst because it was so confined and I think it was weeks in that bathtub, I'd be in there for 5 hours [at a time] just laying there."

== Release ==
DreamWorks Pictures released What Lies Beneath on July 21, 2000, in the United States and Canada, the same day both Pokémon the Movie 2000 and Loser opened. It was distributed by 20th Century Fox internationally.

=== Home media ===
DreamWorks Home Entertainment released What Lies Beneath on VHS and DVD on January 30, 2001. The DVD release features a DTS 5.1 audio track, an audio commentary, a documentary, a theatrical trailer, production notes and cast and crew bios. In its first week of release, the film ranked second on the DVD sales chart behind Dinosaur (standard release) and topped the DVD rentals chart ahead of Me, Myself & Irene. Additionally, it generated a total of $3.7 million in first week DVD rentals, a record that lasted for two months until Meet the Parents beat it in March.

In February 2006, Viacom (now known as Paramount Skydance) acquired the North American rights to What Lies Beneath, along with the rights to all 58 other live-action films DreamWorks had released since 1997, following their $1.6 billion acquisition of the company's live-action assets. In March 2019, the film's international rights transferred to The Walt Disney Company, after Rupert Murdoch sold most of 21st Century Fox's film and television assets to Disney. In the United States, the film has been made available on the subscription streaming service Paramount+, while in international markets like Australia and the United Kingdom it is streaming on subscription service Disney+. In the United States, it was also made available on Paramount's free streaming service Pluto TV.

In 2021, Paramount Home Entertainment issued the film on a domestic Blu-ray. Shout! Factory were later sublicensed the North American home video rights from Paramount. On May 6, 2025, their horror label Scream Factory released it in a 25th anniversary 4K UHD Blu-ray edition, featuring a new feature-length documentary about the making of the film.

== Reception ==
=== Box office ===
What Lies Beneath opened in 2,813 theaters in North America and grossed $29,702,959 for an average of $10,559 per theater. It reached the top spot at the box office upon opening, beating X-Men. This was the third consecutive number one DreamWorks film to open on the third weekend of July after Independence Day, following Saving Private Ryan and The Haunting. It had the fourth-highest opening weekend for a Harrison Ford film, behind Air Force One, Indiana Jones and the Last Crusade and Indiana Jones and the Temple of Doom, as well as the second-highest opening weekend for a Michelle Pfeiffer film, after Batman Returns. At that time, Ford and Pfeiffer respectively needed a box office hit after a string of flops, especially Random Hearts and The Story of Us. In its second weekend, the film dropped by 23%, ranking second behind Nutty Professor II: The Klumps and making $22.8 million. By mid-August 2000, it crossed the $100 million mark, the tenth film of the year to do so. With What Lies Beneath, Ford became the first and only actor to have $100 million domestic grossers released across four decades.

In the UK, What Lies Beneath made $3 million during its opening weekend and beat Dinosaur to rank number one at the box office. In its next weekend, it fell into second place once Dinosaur reclaimed the top spot, declining by 20% and earning $2.2 million. The film then reclaimed the number one spot for its third week with $1.5 million. It was overtaken by Bedazzled in its fourth weekend, ranking second again and making $1.4 million. What Lies Beneath once again reclaimed the top spot for its fifth weekend, collecting $1.1 million and outgrossing third place newcomer Little Nicky.

The film ended up earning $155,464,351 domestically and $135,956,000 internationally for a total of $291,420,351 worldwide, close to triple its production budget of $100 million.

According to 20th Century Fox executive Bill Mechanic, despite the film's significant box-office gross, it was only marginally profitable for the studio: "[It was] I guess the seventh or eighth biggest movie of the year. [It] barely made a profit, because it was expensive to make. A lot of the back end of the movie goes off to the talent. What's left for two studios to split up is fairly minimal. So there's a big hit that has nothing to pay for a loss, barely enough to pay for your overheads and the cost of operations."

=== Critical response ===
What Lies Beneath received mixed reviews from film critics at the time of its release. On the review aggregator website Rotten Tomatoes, 48% of 131 critics' reviews are positive. The website's consensus reads: "Robert Zemeckis is unable to salvage an uncompelling and unoriginal film." Metacritic, which uses a weighted average, assigned the film a score of 51 out of 100, based on 35 critics, indicating "mixed or average" reviews. Audiences polled by CinemaScore gave the film an average grade of "B+" on an A+ to F scale.

The New York Times wrote that "at the start, [Zemeckis] zaps us with quick, glib scares, just to show he still knows how, but his heart isn't in this kind of material anymore. His reflexes are a little slow." The Los Angeles Times called it "spooky with a polished kind of creepiness added in... What Lies Beneath nevertheless feels more planned than passionate, scary at points but unconvincing overall." Marc Savlov of The Austin Chronicle described it as "a kinder, gentler Tales from the Crypt that, in the end, is neither kind nor gentle." Time Out thought that "after a slow build that at times makes every hair stand on end – Zemeckis rolls out every thriller cliché there is. A pity, because until then it's a smart, realistically staged, adult-oriented and extraordinarily effective domestic chiller." Empire wrote "The biggest surprise is, perhaps, that what emerges is no masterpiece, but a semi-sophisticated shocker, playfully homaging Hitchcock like a mechanical masterclass in doing 'genre'. The first hour is great fun... It's an enjoyably giddy ride, certainly, but once you're back from the edge of your seat, you realise most of the creaks and groans are from the decomposing script."

Writing for the Chicago Sun-Times, Roger Ebert gave the film two stars out of four. He praised Michelle Pfeiffer's performance, calling her "convincing and sympathetic", but commented, "Lacking a smarter screenplay, it milks the genuine skills of its actors and director for more than it deserves, and then runs off the rails in an ending more laughable than scary. Along the way, yes, there are some good moments." He also stated that he felt the problem with Zemeckis's desire to direct a Hitchcockian film (What Lies Beneath contains several musical, visual and plot references to Psycho and Vertigo, among other Hitchcock films) was Zemeckis's decision to involve the supernatural, a device Ebert felt Alfred Hitchcock never would have done.

=== Accolades ===
Institution	Category	Recipient	Result	Ref.
ASCAP Award	Top Box Office Films	Alan Silvestri (also for Cast Away and What Women Want)	Won	
Blockbuster Entertainment Awards	Favorite Actor — Suspense	Harrison Ford	Won	
Blockbuster Entertainment Awards	Favorite Actress – Suspense	Michelle Pfeiffer	Won	
Blockbuster Entertainment Awards	Favorite Supporting Actress – Suspense	Diana Scarwid	Nominated	
Golden Trailer Award	Best Horror/Thriller	What Lies Beneath	Nominated	
Nastro d'Argento	Best Male Dubbing	Michele Gammino (dub voice of Harrison Ford in the Italian version)	Won	
Saturn Award	Best Horror Film	Jack Rapke	Nominated	
Saturn Award	Best Horror Film	Steve Starkey	Nominated	
Saturn Award	Best Horror Film	Robert Zemeckis	Nominated	
Saturn Award	Best Director	Robert Zemeckis	Nominated	
Saturn Award	Best Actress	Michelle Pfeiffer	Nominated	

== Legacy ==
=== Future ===
In November 2025, Clark Gregg announced that he was currently developing a project "in the world of What Lies Beneath."

== See also ==
- List of ghost films

== Bibliography ==
- Muir, John Kenneth (2023). Horror Films of 2000-2009. Jefferson, North Carolina: McFarland & Company. ISBN 978-1-476-64450-9.
