= Michael Goldenberg =

American dramatist

- Born: January 18, 1965 (age 61); New York City, U.S.
- Occupations: Screenwriter, playwright, director
- Years active: 1986–present
- Notable work: Harry Potter and the Order of the Phoenix

Michael Goldenberg (born January 18, 1965) is an American playwright, screenwriter and film director. He graduated from the Carnegie Mellon College of Drama in 1986 with a B.F.A. Goldenberg is best known for writing the screenplay for the film Harry Potter and the Order of the Phoenix, which was the only time a Harry Potter film did not have its screenplay written by Steve Kloves.

== Career ==
Goldenberg was the screenwriter and director of Bed of Roses (1996). He was the co-screenwriter for the film adaptation of Contact (1997) and co-adapted the live-action version of Peter Pan (2003) with director P. J. Hogan. He is also the screenwriter for the fifth Harry Potter film Harry Potter and the Order of the Phoenix (2007).

Goldenberg was selected to write the screenplay for Harry Potter and the Order of the Phoenix in November 2004 when Steve Kloves, who had adapted the previous four Harry Potter books, turned down the opportunity to do the fifth film due to exhaustion and an interest in pursuing other projects. The BBC reported Goldenberg was to write and direct a futuristic drama for Warner Bros. afterward. He was also one of the screenwriters for the superhero movie Green Lantern, having rewritten the script for director Martin Campbell.

He also co-wrote (with Geoff Johns) the Green Lantern Prequel Special: SINESTRO #1 for DC Comics (featuring Sinestro from the Green Lantern film). It had a "Movie Art" cover (using a still from the film) and internal art by Fernando Dagnino Guerra. The comic was one of 5 different comic Prequel Specials. He also wrote a screenplay for a Wonder Woman film that was not used.

He wrote a draft of the screenplay for the 2020 Artemis Fowl film, although was not ultimately credited.

== Filmography ==
Year	Title	Director
1996	Bed of Roses	Himself
1997	Contact	Robert Zemeckis
2003	Peter Pan	P. J. Hogan
2007	Harry Potter and the Order of the Phoenix	David Yates
2011	Green Lantern	Martin Campbell
