= Steve Starkey =

American film producer

Steve Starkey is an American film producer and second unit director who has collaborated with Robert Zemeckis. He served as an assistant film editor for both The Empire Strikes Back (1980) and Return of the Jedi (1983) and as second unit director on all of Robert Zemeckis' films from Forrest Gump (1994) to The Walk (2015) in addition to serving as a producer.

== Filmography ==
=== Film ===
==== Producer ====
Year	Title	Credit	Director
1988	Who Framed Roger Rabbit	Associate producer	Robert Zemeckis
1989	Back to the Future Part II	Associate producer	Robert Zemeckis
1990	Back to the Future Part III	Associate producer	Robert Zemeckis
1992	Noises Off	Co-producer	Peter Bogdanovich
1992	Death Becomes Her	Producer	Robert Zemeckis
1994	Forrest Gump	Producer	Robert Zemeckis
1997	Contact	Producer	Robert Zemeckis
2000	What Lies Beneath	Producer	Robert Zemeckis
2000	Cast Away	Producer	Robert Zemeckis
2003	Matchstick Men	Producer	Ridley Scott
2004	The Polar Express	Producer	Robert Zemeckis
2005	The Prize Winner of Defiance, Ohio	Producer	Jane Anderson
2006	Last Holiday	Executive producer	Wayne Wang
2006	Monster House	Producer	Gil Kenan
2007	Beowulf	Producer	Robert Zemeckis
2009	A Christmas Carol	Producer	Robert Zemeckis
2011	Mars Needs Moms	Producer	Simon Wells
2011	Real Steel	Executive producer	Shawn Levy
2012	Flight	Producer	Robert Zemeckis
2015	The Walk	Producer	Robert Zemeckis
2016	Allied	Producer	Robert Zemeckis
2018	Welcome to Marwen	Producer	Robert Zemeckis

==== Second unit director or assistant director ====
Year	Title	Role	Director
1994	Forrest Gump	Second unit director	Robert Zemeckis
1997	Contact	Second unit director	Robert Zemeckis
2000	What Lies Beneath	Second unit director	Robert Zemeckis
2000	Cast Away	Second unit director	Robert Zemeckis
2004	The Polar Express	Second unit director	Robert Zemeckis
2007	Beowulf	Second unit director	Robert Zemeckis
2009	A Christmas Carol	Second unit director	Robert Zemeckis
2012	Flight	Second unit director	Robert Zemeckis
2015	The Walk	Second unit director	Robert Zemeckis

==== Editorial department ====
Year	Title	Role	Director
1980	The Empire Strikes Back	Assistant film editor	Irvin Kershner
1983	Return of the Jedi	Assistant film editor	Richard Marquand

==== Thanks ====
Year	Title	Role	Director
1995	Congo	Special thanks	Frank Marshall
1996	The Frighteners	Special thanks	Peter Jackson

=== Television ===
Year	Title	Credit	Notes
1985−1987	Amazing Stories	Associate producer	
1993	Johnny Bago	Executive producer	
1999	Robert Zemeckis on Smoking, Drinking and Drugging in the 20th Century: In Pursuit of Happiness	Producer	Documentary
