= Monster House =

Monster House may refer to:

- Monster House (American TV series), a Discovery Channel series that ran from 2003 to 2006.
- Monster House (film), a 2006 animated film
  - Monster House (video game), a video game based on the film
- Monster House (Australian TV series), an Australian TV series that debuted in 2008
