= Annie Award for Outstanding Achievement for Voice Acting in a Feature Production =

Film animation award

Annie Awards for Outstanding Achievement for Voice Acting in a Feature Production
- Awarded for: Excellence in voice acting for film animation
- Country: United States
- Presented by: ASIFA-Hollywood
- First award: 1998
- Currently held by: Arden Cho as Rumi (KPop Demon Hunters)
- Website: http://annieawards.org

The Annie Award for Outstanding Achievement for Voice Acting in a Feature Production (or Annie Award for Outstanding Achievement for Voice Acting in an Animated Feature Production) is an Annie Award awarded annually to the best animated feature film and introduced in 1998 rewarding voice acting for animated feature films.

== History ==
Awards for voice acting were awarded at the Annie Awards previously to 1998, but the category was a catch-all for film and television. The award then was divided in two separate sub-categories for males and females in 1998, 2000, and 2001. It was called Outstanding Individual Achievement for Voice Acting in an Animated Feature Production from 1998 to 2001, and Outstanding Voice Acting in an Animated Feature Production from 2002 to 2004.

At the 33rd Annual Awards, Wallace & Gromit: The Curse of the Were-Rabbit was the only film that had multiple nominations without any other films being nominated.

So far, the only tie in this category happened in the 44th Annual Awards with both Auliʻi Cravalho (Moana) and Jason Bateman (Zootopia) sharing the prize.

In 2019, Josh Gad became the category's first two-time winner, when he won for his vocal portrayal of Olaf in Frozen 2, having previously won for voicing the character in 2013 for Frozen.

== Winners and nominees ==
=== Best Achievement in Voice Acting ===
Year	Recipient	Character(s)	Film/Program
1994 (22nd)
1994 (22nd)	Jeremy Irons	Scar	The Lion King
1994 (22nd)	Gregg Berger	Cornfed Pig	Duckman
1994 (22nd)	Mark Hamill	Joker	Batman: The Animated Series
1994 (22nd)	Frank Welker	Various characters	Animaniacs
1994 (22nd)	Billy West	Stimpy	The Ren & Stimpy Show
1995 (23rd)
1995 (23rd)	Nancy Cartwright	Bart Simpson	The Simpsons
1995 (23rd)	Jeff Bennett	Johnny Bravo	Johnny Bravo
1995 (23rd)	Jim Cummings	Mr. Bumpy	Bump in the Night
1995 (23rd)	Tress MacNeille	Dot Warner	Animaniacs
1995 (23rd)	Rob Paulsen	Yakko Warner	Animaniacs
1996 (24th)
1996 (24th)	Rob Paulsen	Pinky	Pinky and the Brain
1996 (24th)	Sean Connery	Draco	Dragonheart
1996 (24th)	Richard Dreyfuss	Mr. Centipede	James and the Giant Peach
1996 (24th)	Jonathan Frakes	David Xanatos	Gargoyles
1996 (24th)	Tom Hanks	Sheriff Woody	Toy Story
1996 (24th)	Tom Hulce	Quasimodo	The Hunchback of Notre Dame
1996 (24th)	Tony Jay	Judge Claude Frollo	The Hunchback of Notre Dame
1996 (24th)	Demi Moore	Esmeralda	The Hunchback of Notre Dame

=== Outstanding Individual Achievement for Voice Acting in an Animated Feature Production ===
Year	Recipient	Character(s)	Film
1998 (26th)
1998 (26th)	Outstanding Individual Achievement in Voice Acting By a Male Performer in an Animated Feature Production		
1998 (26th)	Hank Azaria	Bartok	Anastasia
1998 (26th)	Tim Curry	Forte	Beauty and the Beast: The Enchanted Christmas
1998 (26th)	Jerry Orbach	Lumiere	Beauty and the Beast: The Enchanted Christmas
1998 (26th)	Christopher Plummer	Barnaby Crookedman	Babes in Toyland
1998 (26th)	Paul Winchell	Tigger	Pooh's Grand Adventure: The Search for Christopher Robin
1998 (26th)	Outstanding Individual Achievement in Voice Acting By a Female Performer in an Animated Feature Production		
1998 (26th)	Ming-Na Wen	Fa Mulan	Mulan
1998 (26th)	Cathy Cavadini	Mary Lamb	Babes in Toyland
1998 (26th)	Angela Lansbury	Dowager Empress Marie Feodorovna	Anastasia
1998 (26th)	Meg Ryan	Grand Duchess Anastasia Nikolaevna of Russia	Anastasia
1998 (26th)	Paige O'Hara	Belle	Belle's Magical World
1999 (27th)
1999 (27th)	Eli Marienthal	Hogarth Hughes	The Iron Giant
1999 (27th)	Mary Kay Bergman	Sheila Broflovski	South Park: Bigger, Longer & Uncut
1999 (27th)	Minnie Driver	Jane Porter	Tarzan
1999 (27th)	Ralph Fiennes	Ramesses II	The Prince of Egypt
1999 (27th)	Suzanne Pleshette	Zira	The Lion King II: Simba's Pride

=== 2000s ===
Year	Recipient	Character(s)	Film
2000 (28th)
2000 (28th)	Outstanding Individual Achievement in Voice Acting By a Male Performer in an Animated Feature Production		
2000 (28th)	Tim Allen	Buzz Lightyear	Toy Story 2
2000 (28th)	Armand Assante	Tzekel-Kan	The Road to El Dorado
2000 (28th)	Bill Farmer	Goofy	An Extremely Goofy Movie
2000 (28th)	Nikita Hopkins	Roo	The Tigger Movie
2000 (28th)	Maurice LaMarche	The Brain	Wakko's Wish
2000 (28th)	Outstanding Individual Achievement in Voice Acting By a Female Performer in an Animated Feature Production		
2000 (28th)	Joan Cusack	Jessie	Toy Story 2
2000 (28th)	Tress MacNeille	Dot	Wakko's Wish
2000 (28th)	Della Reese	Eema	Dinosaur
2001 (29th)
2001 (29th)	Outstanding Individual Achievement in Voice Acting By a Male Performer in an Animated Feature Production		
2001 (29th)	Eddie Murphy	Donkey	Shrek
2001 (29th)	Mark Hamill	The Joker	Batman Beyond: Return of the Joker
2001 (29th)	Patrick Warburton	Kronk Pepikrankenitz	The Emperor's New Groove
2001 (29th)	Leonard Nimoy	Kashekim Nedakh	Atlantis: The Lost Empire
2001 (29th)	William Shatner	Mayor Phlegmming	Osmosis Jones
2001 (29th)	Outstanding Individual Achievement in Voice Acting By a Female Performer in an Animated Feature Production		
2001 (29th)	Eartha Kitt	Yzma	The Emperor's New Groove
2001 (29th)	Jodi Benson	Lady	Lady and the Tramp II: Scamp's Adventure
2001 (29th)	Alyssa Milano	Angel	Lady and the Tramp II: Scamp's Adventure
2001 (29th)	Florence Stanley	Mrs. Packard	Atlantis: The Lost Empire
2001 (29th)	Tara Strong	Melody	The Little Mermaid II: Return to the Sea
2002 (30th)
2002 (30th)	Daveigh Chase	Lilo Pelekai	Lilo & Stitch
2002 (30th)	Corey Burton	Captain Hook	Return to Never Land
2002 (30th)	Tim Hodge	Khalil	Jonah: A VeggieTales Movie
2002 (30th)	Brian Murray	John Silver	Treasure Planet
2002 (30th)	Emma Thompson	Captain Amelia	Treasure Planet
2003 (31st)
2003 (31st)	Ellen DeGeneres	Dory	Finding Nemo
2003 (31st)	Joe Alaskey	Daffy Duck	Looney Tunes: Back in Action
2003 (31st)	Jim Cummings	Kaa	The Jungle Book 2
2003 (31st)	Miyoko Shōji	Chiyoko Fujiwara	Millennium Actress
2003 (31st)	Jeremy Suarez	Koda	Brother Bear
2004 (32nd)
2004 (32nd)	Brad Bird	Edna Mode	The Incredibles
2004 (32nd)	Tony Anselmo	Donald Duck	Mickey, Donald, Goofy: The Three Musketeers
2004 (32nd)	Rob Paulsen	The Troubadour	Mickey, Donald, Goofy: The Three Musketeers
2004 (32nd)	Antonio Banderas	Puss in Boots	Shrek 2
2004 (32nd)	Samuel L. Jackson	Lucius Best / Frozone	The Incredibles
2005 (33rd)
2005 (33rd)	Peter Sallis	Wallace	Wallace & Gromit: The Curse of the Were-Rabbit
2005 (33rd)	Helena Bonham Carter	Lady Campanula Tottington	Wallace & Gromit: The Curse of the Were-Rabbit
2005 (33rd)	Ralph Fiennes	Victor Quartermaine	Wallace & Gromit: The Curse of the Were-Rabbit
2005 (33rd)	Nicholas Smith	Reverend Clement Hedges	Wallace & Gromit: The Curse of the Were-Rabbit
2006 (34th)
2006 (34th)	Ian McKellen	The Toad	Flushed Away
2006 (34th)	Maggie Gyllenhaal	Zee	Monster House
2006 (34th)	Sam Lerner	Chowder	Monster House
2006 (34th)	Spencer Locke	Jenny	Monster House
2006 (34th)	Wanda Sykes	Stella	Over the Hedge
2007 (35th)
2007 (35th)	Ian Holm	Skinner	Ratatouille
2007 (35th)	Janeane Garofalo	Colette Tatou	Ratatouille
2007 (35th)	Patton Oswalt	Remy	Ratatouille
2007 (35th)	Julie Kavner	Marge Simpson	The Simpsons Movie
2007 (35th)	Patrick Warburton	Ken	Bee Movie
2008 (36th)
2008 (36th)	Dustin Hoffman	Master Shifu	Kung Fu Panda
2008 (36th)	Ben Burtt	WALL-E / M-O	WALL-E
2008 (36th)	James Hong	Mr. Ping	Kung Fu Panda
2008 (36th)	Ian McShane	Tai Lung	Kung Fu Panda
2008 (36th)	Mark Walton	Rhino	Bolt
2009 (37th)
2009 (37th)	Jennifer Cody	Charlotte La Bouf	The Princess and the Frog
2009 (37th)	Dawn French	Miss Forcible	Coraline
2009 (37th)	Hugh Laurie	Dr. Cockroach Ph.D	Monsters vs. Aliens
2009 (37th)	John Leguizamo	Sid	Ice Age: Dawn of the Dinosaurs
2009 (37th)	Jenifer Lewis	Mama Odie	The Princess and the Frog

=== 2010s ===
Year	Recipient	Character(s)	Film
2010 (38th)
2010 (38th)	Jay Baruchel	Hiccup	How to Train Your Dragon
2010 (38th)	Gerard Butler	Stoick the Vast	How to Train Your Dragon
2010 (38th)	Steve Carell	Gru	Despicable Me
2010 (38th)	Cameron Diaz	Fiona	Shrek Forever After
2010 (38th)	Geoffrey Rush	Ezylryb	Legend of the Guardians: The Owls of Ga'Hoole
2011 (39th)
2011 (39th)	Bill Nighy	Grand-Santa	Arthur Christmas
2011 (39th)	Jemaine Clement	Nigel	Rio
2011 (39th)	Jim Cummings	Featherstone	Gnomeo & Juliet
2011 (39th)	Zach Galifianakis	Humpty Alexander Dumpty	Puss in Boots
2011 (39th)	James Hong	Mr. Ping	Kung Fu Panda 2
2011 (39th)	Gary Oldman	Lord Shen	Kung Fu Panda 2
2011 (39th)	Ashley Jensen	Bryony	Arthur Christmas
2012 (40th)
2012 (40th)	Alan Tudyk	King Candy / Turbo	Wreck-It Ralph
2012 (40th)	Jim Cummings	Butzo	Adventures in Zambezia
2012 (40th)	Jude Law	Pitch Black	Rise of the Guardians
2012 (40th)	Kelly Macdonald	Merida	Brave
2012 (40th)	Catherine O'Hara	Weird Girl	Frankenweenie
2012 (40th)	Atticus Shaffer	"E"Gore	Frankenweenie
2012 (40th)	Adam Sandler	Count Dracula	Hotel Transylvania
2012 (40th)	Imelda Staunton	Queen Victoria	The Pirates! Band of Misfits
2013 (41st)
2013 (41st)	Josh Gad	Olaf	Frozen
2013 (41st)	Steve Carell	Gru	Despicable Me 2
2013 (41st)	Kristen Wiig	Lucy Wilde	Despicable Me 2
2013 (41st)	Pierre Coffin	Minions	Despicable Me 2
2013 (41st)	Terry Crews	Earl	Cloudy with a Chance of Meatballs 2
2013 (41st)	Billy Crystal	Mike Wazowski	Monsters University
2013 (41st)	Paul Giamatti	Chet	Turbo
2014 (42nd)
2014 (42nd)	Ben Kingsley	Archibald Snatcher	The Boxtrolls
2014 (42nd)	Andy García	Eduardo	Rio 2
2014 (42nd)	Dee Bradley Baker	Fish	The Boxtrolls
2014 (42nd)	Cyndi Lauper	Nurse Cyndi	Henry & Me
2015 (43rd)
2015 (43rd)	Phyllis Smith	Sadness	Inside Out
2015 (43rd)	Pierre Coffin	Minions	Minions
2015 (43rd)	Jon Hamm	Herb Overkill	Minions
2015 (43rd)	Alex Garfin	Linus Van Pelt	The Peanuts Movie
2015 (43rd)	Hadley Belle Miller	Lucy Van Pelt	The Peanuts Movie
2015 (43rd)	Jennifer Jason Leigh	Lisa Hesselman	Anomalisa
2015 (43rd)	Tom Kenny	SpongeBob SquarePants	The SpongeBob Movie: Sponge Out of Water
2015 (43rd)	Amy Poehler	Joy	Inside Out
2016 (44th)
2016 (44th)	Auliʻi Cravalho (TIE)	Moana	Moana
2016 (44th)	Jason Bateman (TIE)	Nick Wilde	Zootopia
2016 (44th)	Katie Crown	Tulip	Storks
2016 (44th)	Zooey Deschanel	Bridget	Trolls
2016 (44th)	Art Parkinson	Kubo	Kubo and the Two Strings
2017 (45th)
2017 (45th)	Anthony Gonzalez	Miguel Rivera	Coco
2017 (45th)	Saara Chaudry	Parvana	The Breadwinner
2017 (45th)	Laara Sadiq	Fattema	The Breadwinner
2017 (45th)	Zach Galifianakis	Joker	The Lego Batman Movie
2017 (45th)	Nick Kroll	Professor Poopypants	Captain Underpants: The First Epic Movie
2018 (46th)
2018 (46th)	Bryan Cranston	Chief	Isle of Dogs
2018 (46th)	Holly Hunter	Helen Parr / Elastigirl	Incredibles 2
2018 (46th)	Eddie Redmayne	Dug	Early Man
2018 (46th)	Sarah Silverman	Vanellope von Schweetz	Ralph Breaks the Internet
2018 (46th)	Charlyne Yi	Mai	Next Gen
2019 (47th)
2019 (47th)	Josh Gad	Olaf	Frozen 2
2019 (47th)	Tony Hale	Forky	Toy Story 4
2019 (47th)	Richard Horvitz	Zim	Invader Zim: Enter the Florpus
2019 (47th)	Jenny Slate	Gidget	The Secret Life of Pets 2
2019 (47th)	Tenzing Norgay Trainor	Jin	Abominable

=== 2020s ===
Year	Recipient	Character(s)	Film
2020 (48th)
2020 (48th)	Eva Whittaker	Mebh Óg MacTíre	Wolfwalkers
2020 (48th)	Nicolas Cage	Grug	The Croods: A New Age
2020 (48th)	Robert G. Chiu	Chin	Over the Moon
2020 (48th)	Tom Holland	Ian Lightfoot	Onward
2020 (48th)	Vanessa Marshall	Bella Yaga	Earwig and the Witch
2021 (49th)
2021 (49th)	Abbi Jacobson	Katie Mitchell	The Mitchells vs. the Machines
2021 (49th)	Stephanie Beatriz	Mirabel Madrigal	Encanto
2021 (49th)	John Leguizamo	Bruno Madrigal	Encanto
2021 (49th)	Jack Dylan Grazer	Alberto Scorfano	Luca
2021 (49th)	Kelly Marie Tran	Raya	Raya and the Last Dragon
2022 (50th)
2022 (50th)	Jenny Slate	Marcel	Marcel the Shell with Shoes On
2022 (50th)	David Bradley	Geppetto	Guillermo del Toro's Pinocchio
2022 (50th)	Gregory Mann	Pinocchio	Guillermo del Toro's Pinocchio
2022 (50th)	Zaris-Angel Hator	Maisie Brumble	The Sea Beast
2022 (50th)	Wagner Moura	Wolf	Puss in Boots: The Last Wish
2023 (51st)
2023 (51st)	Chloë Grace Moretz	Nimona	Nimona
2023 (51st)	Jack Black	Bowser	The Super Mario Bros. Movie
2023 (51st)	Tresi Gazal	Gwen Mallard	Migration
2023 (51st)	David Hornsby	Joker	Merry Little Batman
2023 (51st)	Hokuto Matsumura	Souta Munakata	Suzume
2024 (52nd)
2024 (52nd)	Lupita Nyong'o	Roz	The Wild Robot
2024 (52nd)	Kit Connor	Brightbill	The Wild Robot
2024 (52nd)	Maya Hawke	Anxiety	Inside Out 2
2024 (52nd)	Brian Tyree Henry	D-16 / Megatron	Transformers One
2024 (52nd)	Mélinée Leclerc	Linda	Chicken for Linda!
2025 (53rd)
2025 (53rd)	Arden Cho	Rumi	KPop Demon Hunters
2025 (53rd)	Lil Rel Howery	Chief	Dog Man
2025 (53rd)	Remy Edgerly	Glordon	Elio
2025 (53rd)	Craig Robinson	Baloney Tony	In Your Dreams
2025 (53rd)	Maitreyi Ramakrishnan	Beesha	The Twits

== Superlatives ==
Category	Name	Superlative
Most wins	Josh Gad	2
Most nominations	Jim Cummings	4
Most nominations without a win	Jim Cummings	4

=== Age ===
Record	Actor	Film	Age
Oldest winner	Peter Sallis	Wallace & Gromit: The Curse of the Were-Rabbit	85 years, 3 days
Oldest nominee	Peter Sallis	Wallace & Gromit: The Curse of the Were-Rabbit	84 years, 307 days
Youngest winner	Eva Whittaker	Wolfwalkers	11-12 years
Youngest nominee	Nikita Hopkins	The Tigger Movie	10 years, 180 days
