= Spencer Locke =

American actress (born 1991)

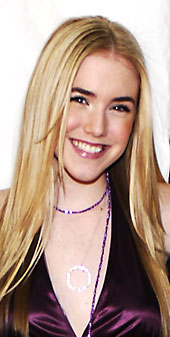
- Locke at the 34th Annie Awards in 2007
- Born: September 20, 1991 (age 35); Winter Park, Florida, U.S.
- Occupation: Actress
- Years active: 2003–present
- Spouse: Chris Mason (m. 2017)
- Children: 1

Spencer Locke (born September 20, 1991) is an American actress known for her roles as Kylie in Cougar Town, Jenny Bennett in Monster House, Ione in Detention, and K-Mart in the Resident Evil film series.

== Life and career ==
A native of Winter Park, Florida, Locke attended the Lisa Maile Image, Modeling and Acting School in that city.

Prior to her recurring role as Candida Keegel in Phil of the Future in 2005, Locke had a recurring role as Bitsy Johnson on season one of the Nickelodeon series Ned's Declassified School Survival Guide. Locke has also guest starred as Brandee Case in the Without a Trace season two episode "Wannabe," Kayla in the That's So Raven season four episode "Mad Hot Cotillion" and Jenny Bennett in the animated film Monster House. She appeared in the 2007 film Resident Evil: Extinction as K-Mart, a girl found in the ruins of a K-Mart by Claire Redfield's companions prior to the outbreak. Locke reprised her role as K-Mart in the film Resident Evil: Afterlife in 2010 and appeared as Amber Bradley in The Vampire Diaries episode "Miss Mystic Falls." Locke had a recurring role in the ABC primetime comedy Cougar Town as Kylie, the girlfriend who Travis Cobb loses his virginity to. She appeared regularly in season one and briefly during season two. On-screen, the pair separated when Travis moved to college while Kylie was still in high school. Locke made her last appearance as Kylie in a brief scene in the season two episode Little Girl Blues when Travis introduces his new girlfriend Kirsten (Collette Wolfe) to the family. Locke is the voice of Wisty Allgood in the audiobooks of the Witch and Wizard series by author James Patterson. She was also the voice of Ashley in Forza Horizon 2 for Xbox. She also played one of the Jennifers on Big Time Rush.

== Personal life ==
Locke married English actor Chris Mason in 2017. In 2020, she gave birth to a daughter, Monroe.

== Filmography ==
=== Film ===
Year	Title	Role	Notes
2003	Kidz Bop: Everyone's a Star!	Herself	Direct-to-video
2004	Spanglish	Sleepover Friend	
2006	Monster House	Jenny Bennett	Voice role, Nominated – Annie Award for Voice Acting in a Feature Production
2007	Resident Evil: Extinction	K-Mart	
2010	Resident Evil: Afterlife	K-Mart	
2011	Captain Fin	Hannah Gunner	Short film
2011	Detention	Ione	
2012	Anatomy of the Tide	Bridgett Harriman	
2012	Karaoke Man	Paige	
2013	All American Christmas Carol	Ghost of Christmas Past	
2013	Tarzan	Jane Porter	
2014	Five O'Clock Comes Early	Lucy	
2015	Landmine Goes Click	Alicia	
2017	Bridal Boot Camp	Andy Phillips	
2018	Insidious: The Last Key	Melissa Rainier	
2018	The Final Wish	Lynette	
2019	Walk. Ride. Rodeo.	Amberley Snyder	
2022	English Estate	Nora Cartwright	Original Great American Family Movie
2023	Among Wolves	Kara	

=== Television ===
Year	Title	Role	Notes
2004	Without a Trace	Brandee Case	Episode: "Wannabe"
2005	Ned's Declassified School Survival Guide	Bitsy Johnson	4 episodes (season 1)
2005	Untitled Camryn Manheim Pilot	Crosby Rydell	Unaired TV pilot
2005	Phil of the Future	Candida Keegel	5 episodes
2006	Boys Life	N/A	Unaired TV pilot
2006	That's So Raven	Kayla	Episode: "Mad Hot Cotillion"
2009	Cold Case	Sarah Blake (1976)	Episode: "Jackals"
2009–2010	Big Time Rush	Jennifer 2	4 episodes (season 1)
2009–2010	Cougar Town	Kylie	Recurring role, 10 episodes
2010	Twentysixmiles	Sally Burnish	Main role
2010	The Vampire Diaries	Amber Bradley	Episode: "Miss Mystic Falls"
2010	In Plain Sight	Sabrina Anderson/Sabrina Jordan	Episode: "WitSec Stepmother"
2011	Love Bites	Christy Hayes	Episode: "Sky High"
2011	The Bling Ring	Maddie Bishop	Television film
2012	CSI: Miami	Jessica Wyatt	Episode: "Terminal Velocity"
2012	NCIS	Amber Banks	Episode: "Psych Out"
2013	Cult	Carey Mandeville	2 episodes
2013	Two and a Half Men	Jill	Episode: "Some Kind of Lesbian Zombie"
2015	Hawaii Five-0	Aubrey Harper	Episode: "Big Lie"
2015	Babysitter's Black Book	Ashley	Television film
2016	CSI: Cyber	Madison Brooks	Episode: "Flash Squad"

=== Video games ===
Year	Title	Voice role	Notes
2006	Monster House	Jenny Bennett	
2014	Forza Horizon 2	Ashley	
