= Cory Snyder =

American baseball player (born 1962)

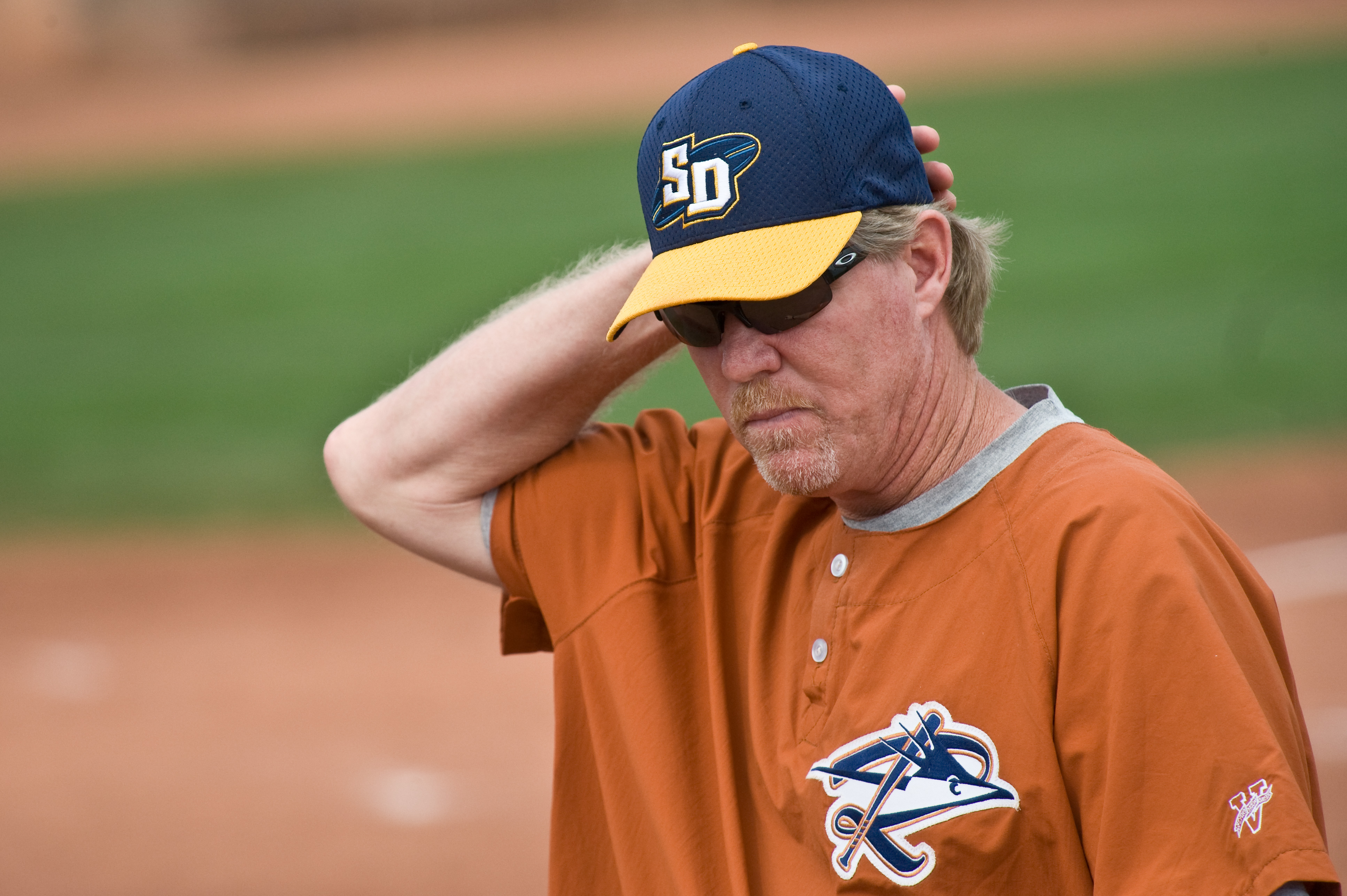
- Snyder with the San Diego Surf Dawgs in 2008
- Right fielder
- Born: November 11, 1962 (age 63); Inglewood, California, U.S.
- Batted: Right Threw: Right

MLB debut
- June 13, 1986, for the Cleveland Indians

Last MLB appearance
- August 10, 1994, for the Los Angeles Dodgers

MLB statistics
- Batting average: .247
- Home runs: 149
- Runs batted in: 488
- Stats at Baseball Reference

Teams
- Cleveland Indians (1986–1990); Chicago White Sox (1991); Toronto Blue Jays (1991); San Francisco Giants (1992); Los Angeles Dodgers (1993–1994)
Medals
Men's baseball
Representing United States
Olympic Games
| Silver medal – second place | 1984 Los Angeles | Team |
Pan American Games
| Bronze medal – third place | 1983 Caracas | Team |

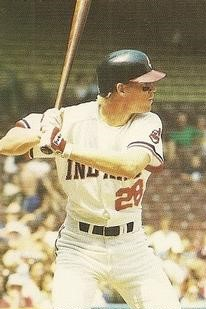
Snyder batting for the Cleveland Indians

James Cory Snyder (born November 11, 1962) is an American former professional baseball right fielder. He played nine seasons in Major League Baseball (MLB) from 1986 to 1994 for the Cleveland Indians, Chicago White Sox, Toronto Blue Jays, San Francisco Giants, and Los Angeles Dodgers. He was known for his powerful throwing arm. He is on the list of Major League Baseball career assists as a right fielder leaders and the list of college baseball career home run leaders. Starting in 2006, he has been a baseball coach and a manager in various minor leagues, and in 2020 also started working as an automobile salesperson in Lindon, Utah.

== Early life ==
Snyder grew up in Canyon Country, Santa Clarita, California, and started playing baseball when he was 6 or 7 years old. When he was 8 years old, he joined Little League Baseball. His father was a pitcher in the Milwaukee Braves organization for three years until he hurt his arm. Snyder attended Canyon High School.

== Playing career ==
Snyder received a full baseball scholarship to Brigham Young University, where he played for the BYU Cougars baseball team. In his first game with BYU, during his first three at-bats, he hit three home runs on three consecutive pitches. He was named 1982 Freshman of the Year.

In 1983, Snyder played collegiate summer baseball for the Harwich Mariners of the Cape Cod Baseball League (CCBL). He batted .321 for the season, belting a league-record 22 home runs, including homers in four consecutive at-bats on July 7–8. Snyder led the Mariners to the league title, and was named the league's outstanding pro prospect. He was inducted into the Cape Cod Baseball League Hall of Fame in 2003. Snyder played for the USA team in the 1983 Pan American Games in Venezuela and is on the list of Pan American Games medalists in baseball.

In early 1984, he moved to Camarillo, California. In June 1984, Snyder was drafted by the Cleveland Indians as the 4th overall pick in the 1st round of the 1984 Major League Baseball draft. He was on the 1984 College Baseball All-America Team.

In August 1984, in the 1984 Summer Olympics, Snyder was on the first United States national baseball team, which earned a silver medal in baseball at the 1984 Summer Olympics.

In 1985, Snyder received the Eastern League Most Valuable Player Award.

In May 1986, while playing for the Maine Guides, Snyder was sued after an incident where he threw his bat towards the backstop, but due to pine tar in his hands, it flew into the stands and hit two women sitting in the front row, breaking one of their noses and cracking the dental plate and bloodying the lip of the other. A judge dismissed the charges in the criminal case. In March 1988, Snyder settled the civil charges out of court.

In June 1986, Snyder was called up to the major leagues.

In 1986, he finished 4th in AL Rookie of the Year voting.

In 1987, along with teammate Joe Carter, Snyder appeared on the cover of Sports Illustrated.

In 1989, he suffered a back injury after diving for a ball. A slump in performance followed, leading to an adverse relationship between Snyder and team officials.

On December 4, 1990, the Cleveland Indians traded Snyder to the Chicago White Sox in exchange for pitchers Eric King and Shawn Hillegas. His salary was set by an arbitrator at $800,000, a $100,000 raise. There, coach Walt Hriniak forced him to change his hitting style, which Snyder believes was for the worse. He also had a strained relationship with manager Jeff Torborg after being told he would only play part-time. In July 1991, the White Sox traded Snyder to the Toronto Blue Jays for Shawn Jeter and a player to be named later.

On March 28, 1992, after being released by the Blue Jays, Snyder was signed by the San Francisco Giants. In June 1992, he received the NL Major League Baseball Player of the Month Award. On December 5, 1992, Snyder was signed by the Los Angeles Dodgers to a two-year contract at $1.5 million per year. He retired from the major leagues after the 1994–95 Major League Baseball strike. Snyder's total earnings from major league baseball teams was $5,740,000.

On March 30, 1995, Snyder was signed by the San Diego Padres to a contract with Las Vegas of the Pacific Coast League.

On February 20, 1997, Snyder unsuccessfully tried out for the St. Louis Cardinals.

== Coaching career ==
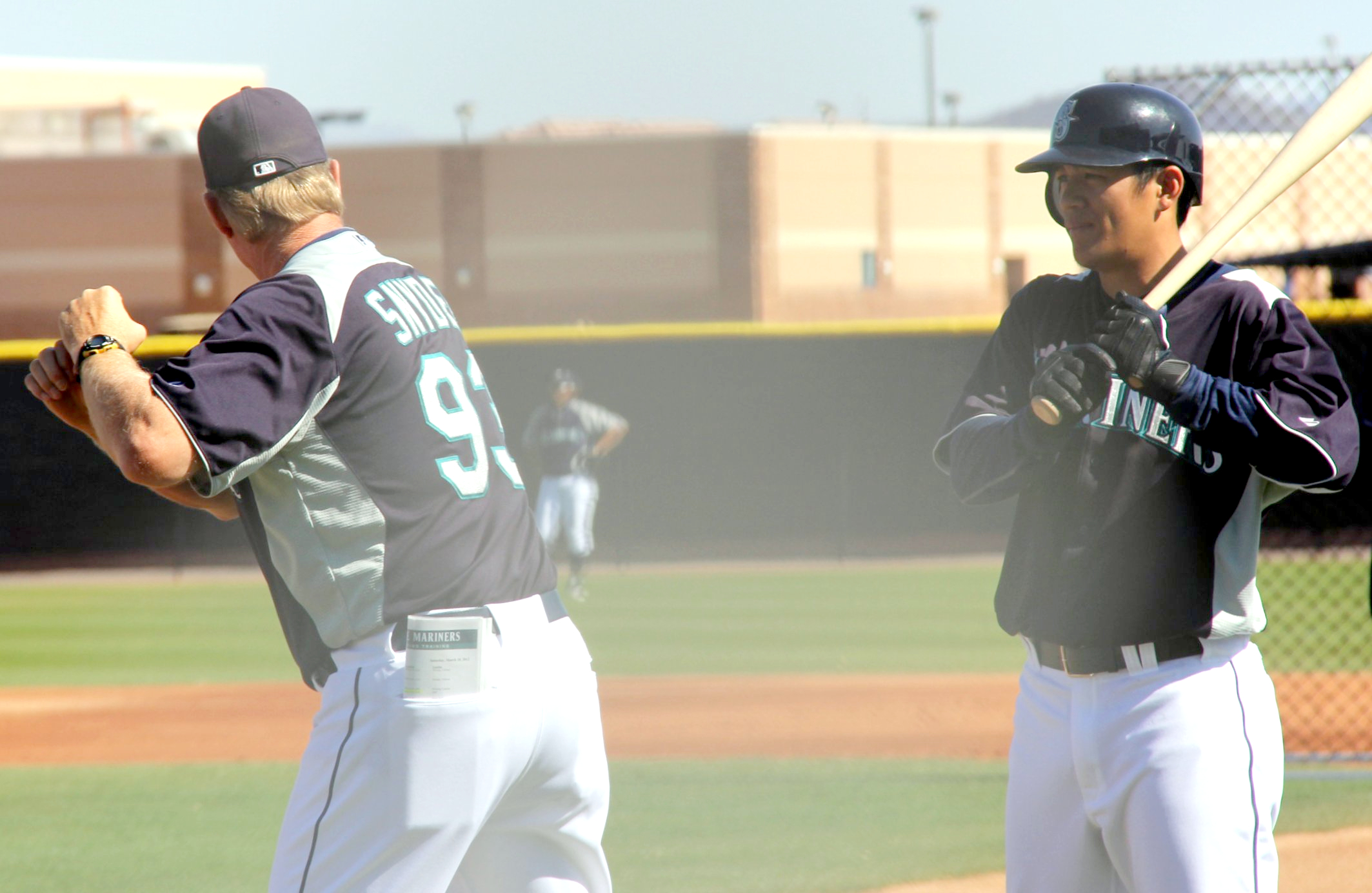
Snyder and Chih-Hsien Chiang in 2012 Spring Training

In 1998, at age 37, Snyder began to think about a career in coaching. At that time, he lived in Laguna Hills, California, where he taught kids baseball in his backyard. He also owned a sporting goods store.

In December 2001, he opened a baseball facility in Lindon, Utah.

In March 2006, Snyder received a 10-day assignment to assist in coaching the minor league players of the Cleveland Indians.

From 2007 to 2009, Snyder managed the St. George Roadrunners of the Golden Baseball League. In 2008, he also managed the San Diego Surf Dawgs. In 2010, he managed the Na Koa Ikaika Maui, of the North American League.

Snyder joined the Seattle Mariners organization as a coach for the Jackson Generals in 2011-2013 and Tacoma Rainiers in 2014-2015.

In January 2016, Snyder joined as the hitting coach of the Pericos de Puebla of the Mexican League. On June 3, 2016, he was promoted to manager, replacing Matías Carrillo, leading the team to their first championship in 30 years by defeating the Toros de Tijuana in the Serie del Rey. He is only the fourth American manager to win Mexico's highest professional level baseball championship.

In 2017-2018, Snyder managed the CTBC Brothers baseball team of the Chinese Professional Baseball League (CPBL).

In February 2019, Snyder became Director of Public Relations for the Orem Owlz, a Minor League Baseball team.

In February 2022, Snyder was named manager of the Northern Colorado Owlz.

On December 11, 2024, Snyder returned to the Mexican League as he was named manager of the Piratas de Campeche. On May 22, 2025, Snyder was fired by Campeche and replaced by Daren Brown.

== Personal life ==
Snyder and his wife Tina have been married since 1985 and have six children, Ashley, Amberley, JC, Taylor, Aubrey, and Autumn. They are members of the Church of Jesus Christ of Latter-day Saints and Snyder does not drink alcohol due to his religion. In 1991, Snyder was featured in a public relations campaign by the church to improve the reputation of Mormonism.

In 1998, Snyder moved to Mapleton, Utah. In 2020, Snyder became an automobile salesperson for Murdock Hyundai in Lindon, Utah.

Amberley Snyder, involved in professional barrel racing, was paralyzed from the waist down after a car accident in January 2010 when she was 18 years old. She is the subject of the biopic Walk. Ride. Rodeo., produced and distributed by Netflix. Cory was portrayed in the film by Bailey Chase.

Snyder enjoys playing golf and had a 2 handicap.

| Preceded by Félix José | Major League Baseball Player of the Month Award; June, 1992 | Succeeded by Brett Butler |
