= Annie Award for Best Animated Video Game =

Retired annual US animation award

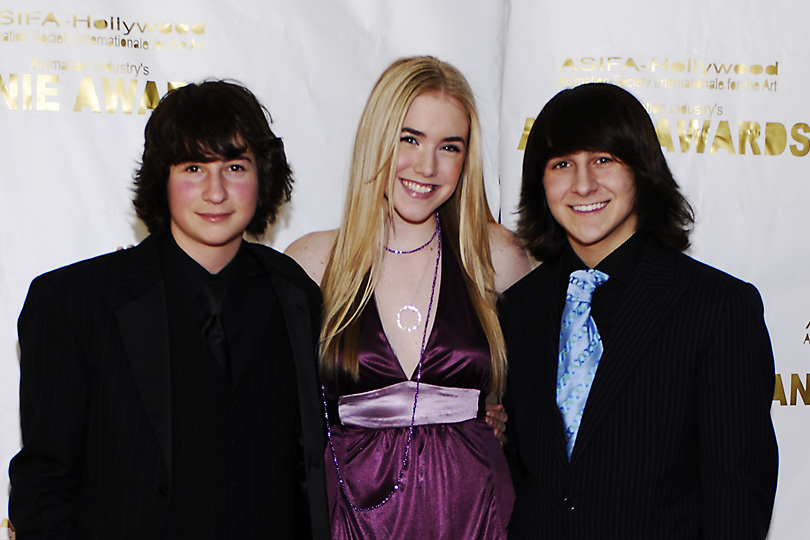
The cast and crew of the film Monster House appeared at the 34th Annie Awards both for the film's Best Animated Feature nomination as well as for the video game adaptation's award nomination, the voice actors (pictured) having reprised their roles in the game.

The Annie Award for Best Animated Video Game was awarded annually by ASIFA-Hollywood, a non-profit organization that honors contributions to animation, to one animated video game each year from 2005 to 2014. The award is one of the Annie Awards, which are given to contributions to animation, including producers, directors, and voice actors. The Annie Awards were created in 1972 by June Foray to honor individual lifetime contributions to animation. In 1992, the scope of the awards was expanded to honor animation as a whole; the Annie Award for Best Animated Feature was created as a result of this move, and subsequent awards have been created to recognize different contributions to animation. The Annie Award for Best Animated Video Game was created in 2005, and has been awarded yearly since except in 2009. To be eligible for the award, the game must have been released in the year before the next Annie Awards ceremony, and the developers of the game must send a five-minute DVD that shows the gameplay and graphics of the game to a committee appointed by the Board of Directors of ASIFA-Hollywood.

The Annie Award for Best Animated Video Game has been awarded to nine video games. The now-defunct video game development company THQ had six of its games nominated for the Annie Award for Best Animated Video Game, and one of them, Ratatouille, won the award. Among the nominees, seven video games are adaptations of a feature film (Note: The seven nominees that are adaptations of feature films are Flushed Away, Monster House, Ratatouille, Bee Movie Game, Transformers: The Game, Kung Fu Panda, and WALL-E) and three are adaptations of animated television series. (Note: The three nominees that are adaptations of animated television series are SpongeBob SquarePants: Lights, Camera, Pants!, SpongeBob SquarePants: Creature from the Krusty Krab, and Avatar: The Last Airbender - The Burning Earth) Although most nominees have been released for multiple video game consoles, three of the entrants to the 38th Annie Awards (held February 5, 2011) and five contenders at the 39th Annie Awards had only been released on one platform at the time.

== Winners and nominees ==
Table key
‡	Indicates the winner

Year (Ceremony)	Video game	Developer(s) / Publisher(s)	Ref(s).
2005 (33rd)	Ultimate Spider-Man ‡	Activision, Treyarch	
2005 (33rd)	Psychonauts	Double Fine Productions	
2005 (33rd)	Resident Evil 4	Capcom	
2005 (33rd)	SpongeBob SquarePants: Lights, Camera, Pants!	THQ	
2005 (33rd)	Tak: The Great Juju Challenge	THQ	
2006 (34th)	Flushed Away ‡	D3 Publisher	
2006 (34th)	Monster House	THQ	
2006 (34th)	SpongeBob SquarePants: Creature from the Krusty Krab	THQ	
2007 (35th)	Ratatouille ‡	THQ	
2007 (35th)	Avatar: The Last Airbender – The Burning Earth	THQ	
2007 (35th)	Bee Movie Game	Activision	
2007 (35th)	Transformers: The Game	Blur Studios	
2008 (36th)	Kung Fu Panda ‡	Activision	
2008 (36th)	Dead Space	Electronic Arts	
2008 (36th)	WALL-E	THQ	
2010 (38th)	Limbo ‡	Playdead	
2010 (38th)	Heavy Rain	Quantic Dream	
2010 (38th)	Kirby's Epic Yarn	Good-Feel & HAL Laboratory	
2010 (38th)	Shank	Klei Entertainment	
2011 (39th)	Insanely Twisted Shadow Planet ‡	Shadow Planet Productions (Fuelcell Games/Gagne International)	
2011 (39th)	Bumpy Road	Simogo	
2011 (39th)	Gears of War 3	Epic Games	
2011 (39th)	Gesundheit!	Revolutionary Concepts	
2011 (39th)	Ghost Trick: Phantom Detective	Capcom	
2011 (39th)	Ratchet & Clank: All 4 One	Insomniac Games	
2011 (39th)	Rayman Origins	Ubisoft Montpellier	
2011 (39th)	Uncharted 3: Drake’s Deception	Naughty Dog	
2012 (40th)	Journey ‡	Thatgamecompany	
2012 (40th)	Borderlands 2	Gearbox Software	
2012 (40th)	Skullgirls	Lab Zero Games	
2012 (40th)	Family Guy: Back to the Multiverse	Heavy Iron Studios	
2013 (41st)	The Last of Us ‡	Naughty Dog	
2013 (41st)	Diggs Nightcrawler	Moonbot Studios, Exient Entertainment	
2013 (41st)	Tiny Thief	5 ANTS	
2014 (42nd)	Valiant Hearts: The Great War ‡	Ubisoft Montpellier	
2014 (42nd)	Forza Horizon 2	Microsoft Studios, Turn 10, Playground Games	
2014 (42nd)	Child of Light	Ubisoft Montreal	

== See also ==
- British Academy Games Award for Best Game
