= Tiny Thief =

2013 point and click adventure video game

- Developers: 5Ants; Abylight (Wii U)
- Publisher: Rovio Stars: JP: Nintendo (Wii U)
- Platforms: Android, iOS, Microsoft Windows, OS X, Wii U
- Release: Android, iOS: WW: 11 July 2013; Windows, OS X: WW: 16 December 2013; Wii U: JP: 13 November 2015
- Genre: Point and click adventure game
- Mode: Single-player

Tiny Thief was a 2013 point-and-click adventure video game developed by 5Ants and published by Rovio Entertainment through its Rovio Stars program. The player controls a thief who goes on a quest to steal items from enemies. Players can interact with objects to progress through each level and achieve the targeted item. Enemies are present throughout, and players must avoid getting caught by utilizing the game's stealth mechanics. The game implements a three-star performance system, with each of the star corresponding to goals completed.

Tiny Thief was developed by a team of two under the name 5Ants. The game went through several setbacks, mainly regarding its animation. Rovio further supported its development and released the game under their third-party publishing program Rovio Stars. The game was released for iOS and Android on 11 July 2013 and for Windows and OS X on 16 December 2013. The game was later ported to the Wii U in November 2015. Following an announcement made by Rovio, the game was discontinued and removed from app stores in February 2016.

The game received generally favorable reviews, with critics praising its animation and level design but noted its short length. It won the People's Choice Award at the 10th International Mobile Gaming Awards and received a nomination for Best Animated Video Game at the 41st Annie Awards.

== Gameplay ==
In Tiny Thief, players control a thief who attempts to steal items from enemies. Players progress by moving the thief to accessible areas and interacting with objects, while evading enemies that he encounters. Players may avoid enemies by distracting, defeating, or hiding from them.

The game consists of six chapters, each containing five levels, each of which have a different plot, set in a vague medieval period. Along the way, players will encounter enemies such as pirates, bakers, a sheriff, as well as the black knight.

The game uses a three-star rating system; therefore, players can receive one, two or three stars depending on goal completions. The central star is given when the thief successfully steals the main object, which is required to complete the level. The left star is given when the thief steals multiple hidden objects in a level. The right star is given when the player taps (or clicks) the thief's hidden pet ferret. The game also include achievements that can be obtained by completing certain tasks.

== Development ==
In May 2013, Rovio announced their plans on making a project called Rovio Stars, where they would publish games made by third-party developers as an effort to boost their game lineup.

Two months later, Rovio Stars released Tiny Thief, a game developed by Barcelona-based studio 5Ants on iOS and Android. It was their second game released from the project; with the first one being Icebreaker: A Viking Voyage.

In March 14 2014, a teaser for a new chapter, Bewitched, was uploaded to 5Ant's YouTube channel. The chapter was released on April 3 2014. On the same day of the release of the new chapter, the games tutorial and first chapter, First Lessons, had been removed and replaced with the second chapter, A Rumbling Stomach.

In November 2015, Abylight Studios alongside 5Ants developed the game on efforts for it to be released on the Wii U. On a blog posted by Abylight, they stated that "Art, graphics and gameplay over 30 different levels, 50 unique characters, 3000 unique animations and over 100 hidden objects, have drawn the attention of Nintendo Japan for making a Wii U title". The game was later available on the Japanese Wii U Nintendo eShop for a price of 800 yen.

Rovio discontinued development of Tiny Thief and removed it from app stores in February 2016. Rovio uploaded the game's full soundtrack to their YouTube channel in May 30 2022.

== Reception ==
Reception

Aggregate score
Aggregator	Score
Metacritic	iOS: 86/100

Review score
Publication	Score
TouchArcade	iOS: 5/5

Tiny Thief received favorable reviews on the aggregate review website Metacritic; the game attained an overall score of 86 out of 100 based on 21 reviews. It has been presented with the "Editor’s Choice" on the iOS App Store and won the People's Choice Award at the 10th annual International Mobile Gaming Awards.
