= 34th Annie Awards =

US media awards ceremony held in 2007

- Date: February 11, 2007
- Site: Alex Theatre, Glendale, California, USA
- Hosted by: Tom Kenny
- Organized by: ASIFA-Hollywood

Highlights
- Best Animated Feature: Cars
- Best Direction: Tim Johnson and Karey Kirkpatrick; Over the Hedge
- Most awards: Flushed Away (5)
- Most nominations: Cars (9)

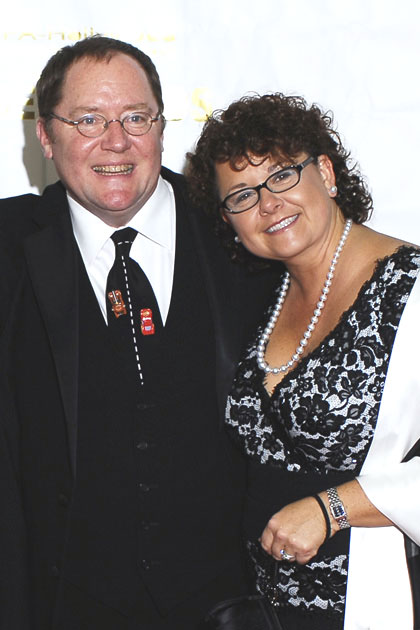
Cars director John Lasseter on the red carpet at the 34th Annual Annie Awards. Photo by John B. Mueller.

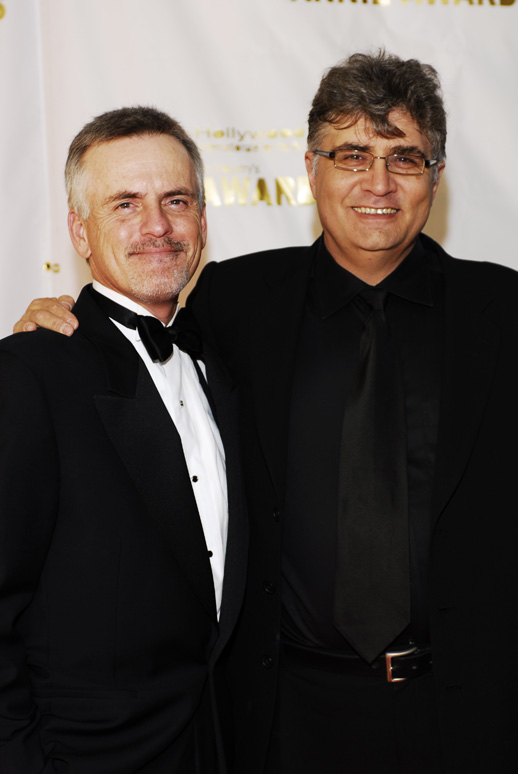
Rob Paulsen and Maurice LaMarche on the red carpet. Photo by John B. Mueller.

The ceremony for the 34th Annual Annie Awards, honoring the best in animation in 2006, was held on February 11, 2007, at the Alex Theatre in Glendale, California. It was hosted by Tom Kenny.

The nominations were announced on December 4, 2006.

== Production nominees ==
Winners are marked in bold text.

=== Best Animated Feature ===
- **Cars**
- Happy Feet
- Monster House
- Open Season
- Over the Hedge

=== Best Home Entertainment Production ===
- **Bambi II**
- The Adventures of Brer Rabbit
- Winnie-the-Pooh: Shapes & Sizes

=== Best Animated Short Subject ===
- **No Time for Nuts**
- Adventure Time
- Fumi and the Bad Luck Foot
- "Weird Al" Yankovic - "Don't Download This Song"

=== Best Animated Television Commercial ===
- **United Airlines - "Dragon"**
- Candace Kane's Candy Factory - "Ka-chew!"
- ESPN - "Believe"
- Hilton Hotels & Resorts - "Dancing Couple"
- Saint Louis Zoo - "Giraffe"

=== Best Animated Television Production ===
- **Foster's Home for Imaginary Friends**
- Charlie and Lola
- The Fairly OddParents
- King of the Hill
- Wow! Wow! Wubbzy!

=== Best Animated Video Game ===
- **Flushed Away: The Game**
- Monster House
- SpongeBob SquarePants: Creature from the Krusty Krab

== Individual achievement ==
=== Animated Effects ===
- **Scott Cegielski** – **Flushed Away** – DreamWorks Animation & Aardman Features
- Keith Klohn – Cars – Pixar Animation Studios
- David Stephens – Open Season – Sony Pictures Animation/Columbia Pictures
- Erdem Taylan – Cars – Pixar Animation Studios
- John David Thornton – Ice Age: The Meltdown – Blue Sky Studios

=== Character Animation in a Feature Production ===
- **Gabe Hordos** – **Flushed Away** – DreamWorks Animation & Aardman Features
- Line Andersen – Flushed Away – DreamWorks Animation & Aardman Features
- Carlos Baena – Cars – Pixar Animation Studios
- Bobby Podesta – Cars – Pixar Animation Studios
- Kristof Serrand – Over The Hedge – DreamWorks Animation

=== Character Animation in a Television Production ===
- **Yu Jae Myung** – **Avatar: The Last Airbender** "**The Blind Bandit**" – Nickelodeon
- Joshua Jennings – Moral Orel – ShadowMachine Films
- Eileen Kohlhepp – Family Guy – Fox TV
- Sihanouk Mariona – Robot Chicken – ShadowMachine Films

=== Character Design in an Animated Feature Production ===
- **Nico Marlet** – **Over The Hedge** – DreamWorks Animation
- Peter de Sève – Ice Age: The Meltdown – Blue Sky Studios
- Carter Goodrich – Open Season – Sony Pictures Animation/Columbia Pictures

=== Character Design in an Animated Television Production ===
- **Mike Kunkel** – **The Life & Times of Juniper Lee** **"Party Monsters"** – Cartoon Network Studios
- Ben Balistreri – Danny Phantom "King Tuck" – Nickelodeon
- Carlos Ramos – The X’s "Homebody" – Nickelodeon
- Eric Robles – The X’s "You Only Sneeze Twice" – Nickelodeon

=== Directing in an Animated Feature Production ===
- **Tim Johnson & Karey Kirkpatrick** – **Over The Hedge** – DreamWorks Animation
- David Bowers & Sam Fell – Flushed Away – DreamWorks Animation & Aardman Features
- Gil Kenan – Monster House – Columbia Pictures ImageMovers/Amblin Entertainment
- John Lasseter – Cars – Pixar Animation Studios
- Carlos Saldanha – Ice Age: The Meltdown – Blue Sky Studios

=== Directing in an Animated Television Production ===
- **Giancarlo Volpe** – **Avatar: The Last Airbender** **“The Drill”** – Nickelodeon
- Shaun Cashman – The Grim Adventures of Billy & Mandy “Hill Billy” – Cartoon Network Studios
- Craig McCracken – Foster’s Home for Imaginary Friends “Bus the Two of Us” – Cartoon Network Studios
- Guy Vasilovich – Growing Up Creepie “The Tell-Tale Poem” – Mike Young Productions

=== Music in an Animated Feature Production ===
- **Randy Newman** – **Cars** – Pixar Animation Studios
- John Debney – The Ant Bully – Warner Bros. Pictures Presents in Association with Legendary Pictures, a Playtone Production in Association with DNA Productions
- Gordon Goodwin – Bah, Humduck! A Looney Tunes Christmas – Warner Bros. Animation
- Laura Karpman – A Monkey’s Tale – Dedica Group
- John Powell – Ice Age: The Meltdown – Blue Sky Studios

=== Music in an Animated Television Production ===
- **James L. Venable & Jennifer Kes Remington – Foster's Home for Imaginary Friends: "One False Movie"** (Cartoon Network Studios)
- Brad Benedict, Mark Fontana & Erik Godal – Squirrel Boy: "A Line in the Sandwich" (Cartoon Network Studios)
- John King – Shorty McShorts' Shorts: "Boyz on Da Run Part 1" (Walt Disney Television Animation)
- Steve Marston – Jakers! The Adventures of Piggley Winks: "The Gift" (Mike Young Productions)

=== Production Design in an Animated Feature Production ===
- **Pierre-Olivier Vincent** – **Flushed Away** – DreamWorks Animation & Aardman Features
- William Cone – Cars – Pixar Animation Studios
- Andy Harkness – Open Season – Sony Pictures Animation/Columbia Pictures
- Michael Humphries – Open Season – Sony Pictures Animation/Columbia Pictures
- Paul Shardlow – Over The Hedge – DreamWorks Animation

=== Production Design in an Animated Television Production ===
- **Martin Ansolabehere** – **Foster's Home for Imaginary Friends** “**Good Wilt Hunting**” – Cartoon Network Studios
- Alan Bodner - The Life and Times of Juniper Lee “Water We Fighting For” - Cartoon Network Studios
- Bob Boyle – Wow! Wow! Wubbzy – “Tale of Tails” – Produced by Bolder Media, Inc. in association with Film Roman, a Starz Company.
- Dan Krall – My Gym Partner’s A Monkey “Grub Drive” – Cartoon Network Studios
- Sue Mondt – Camp Lazlo “Hard Days Samson” – Cartoon Network Studios

=== Storyboarding in an Animated Feature Production ===
- **Gary Graham** **Over The Hedge** – DreamWorks Animation
- Thom Enriquez Over The Hedge – DreamWorks Animation
- William H. Frake III Ice Age: The Meltdown – Blue Sky Studios
- Kris Pearn Open Season – Sony Pictures Animation/Columbia Pictures
- Simon Wells Flushed Away – DreamWorks Animation & Aardman Features

=== Storyboarding in an Animated Television Production ===
- **Li Hong** – **The X's** “**You Only Sneeze Twice**” – Nickelodeon
- Troy Adomitis - American Dragon: Jake Long “Breakout” – Walt Disney Television Animation
- Ben Balistreri – Danny Phantom “Urban Jungle” – Nickelodeon
- Shaut Nigoghossian – Danny Phantom “Reality Trip” – Nickelodeon
- Adam Van Wyk – Hellboy “Sword of Storms” – Film Roman, a Starz Media Co.

=== Voice Acting in an Animated Feature Production ===
- **Ian McKellen** – Voice of the Toad – **Flushed Away** – DreamWorks Animation & Aardman Features
- Maggie Gyllenhaal – Voice of Zee – Monster House – Columbia Pictures ImageMovers/Amblin Entertainment
- Sam Lerner – Voice of Chowder – Monster House – Columbia Pictures ImageMovers/Amblin Entertainment
- Spencer Locke – Voice of Jenny – Monster House – Columbia Pictures ImageMovers/Amblin Entertainment
- Wanda Sykes – Voice of Stella – Over The Hedge – DreamWorks Animation

=== Voice Acting in an Animated Television Production ===
- **Eartha Kitt** – Voice of Yzma – **The Emperor's New School** “**Kuzclone**” – Walt Disney Television Animation
- Keith Ferguson – Voice of Blooregard – Foster’s Home for Imaginary Friends “Squeeze the Day” – Cartoon Network Studios
- Mila Kunis – Voice of Meg Griffin – Family Guy “Barely Legal” – Fuzzy Door Productions
- Russi Taylor – Voice of Ferny – Jakers! “Mi Galeon” – Mike Young Productions
- Patrick Warburton – Voice of Kronk – The Emperor’s New School “Kuzclone” – Walt Disney Television Animation

=== Writing in an Animated Feature Production ===
- **Dick Clement & Ian La Frenais and Chris Lloyd & Joe Keenan and Will Davies** – **Flushed Away** – DreamWorks Animation & Aardman Features
- Rich Burns – Brother Bear 2 – DisneyToon Studios
- Dan Harmon, Rob Schrab & Pamela Pettler – Monster House – Columbia Pictures Presents an ImageMovers/Amblin Entertainment
- Dan Fogelman – Cars – Pixar Animation Studios
- George Miller, John Collee, Judy Morris & Warren Coleman – Happy Feet – Warner Bros. Pictures Presents in Association with Village Roadshow Pictures, A Kennedy Miller Production in Association with Animal Logic Film

=== Writing in an Animated Television Production ===
- **Ian Maxtone-Graham** – **The Simpsons** “**The Seemingly Neverending Story**” – Gracie Films
- Kirker Butler – Family Guy “Barely Legal” – Fuzzy Door Productions
- Tom Sheppard – My Gym Partner’s a Monkey “Nice Moustache” – Cartoon Network Studios
- Dan Vebber – American Dad “American Dad Afterschool Special” – Fuzzy Door Productions/Underdog Productions
- John Viener – Family Guy “The Griffin Family History” – Fuzzy Door Productions

== Juried awards ==
=== June Foray Award ===
Significant and benevolent or charitable impact on the art and industry of animation.

- Stephen Worth

=== Winsor McCay Award ===
Recognition of lifetime or career contributions to the art of animation.

- Bill Plympton
- Genndy Tartakovsky
- Andreas Deja

=== Ub Iwerks Award ===
- None

=== Special Achievement ===
- None

=== Certificate of Merit ===
- Bill Matthews
- Michael Fallik
- Marc Deckter
- Eric Graf
