= Walk. Ride. Rodeo. =

2019 film by Conor Allyn

- Film poster
- Directed by: Conor Allyn
- Screenplay by: Sean Dwyer; Greg Cope White
- Story by: Dan Goforth
- Produced by: Julie Crank Di Cataldo; Sean Dwyer; Elizabeth Cullen
- Starring: Spencer Locke; Bailey Chase; Alyvia Alyn Lind; Max Ehrich; Corbin Bleu; Kathleen Rose Perkins; Sherri Shepherd; Missi Pyle
- Cinematography: Thomas L. Callaway
- Edited by: Cody Miller
- Music by: Sean Murray
- Production companies: Poke Prod; Netflix
- Distributed by: Netflix
- Release date: March 8, 2019
- Running time: 99 minutes
- Country: United States
- Language: English

Walk. Ride. Rodeo. is a 2019 American biopic directed by Conor Allyn from a screenplay by Sean Dwyer and Greg Cope White about the life of Amberley Snyder, a nationally ranked rodeo barrel racer who defies the odds to return to the sport after barely surviving a car crash that leaves her paralyzed from the waist down. It stars Missi Pyle, Spencer Locke, Bailey Chase, and Sherri Shepherd.

== Plot ==
19-year-old Amberley Snyder is a nationally ranked rodeo barrel racer who spends most of her time training with her horse Power at her home in Utah. On her way to Denver, Amberley loses control of her truck and crashes; ejected from the vehicle, she hits a fence pole, rendering her a paraplegic.

Amberley is rushed to a hospital where doctors confirm she will live the rest of her life in a wheelchair. She later goes to a six-week rehabilitation program. Initially despondent, she lashes out at her mother Tina, knowing she will never be able to do everything she used to, but she pushes herself to find balance and strength in her upper body.

She returns home to an email from Tate Watkins with the FFA, who asks if she'll still be participating in the event. They communicate via video call over a number of weeks and grow closer. Amberley struggles to adjust to daily life but later, with determination and passion, learns to drive and realises she can still ride a horse if she attaches a seat belt to her saddle. She also starts college at Utah South.

Over the upcoming months, Amberley becomes more and more confident on her horse and takes part in the Spanish Fork Rodeo where she gets second place, less than twelve months since her accident. She continues training in preparation for The American Rodeo, but fails to tell her family about an infected pressure sore on her back. One afternoon Amberley collapses and is rushed to a hospital and informed she is critical.

Six weeks later, Amberley has recovered and begins training again, fueled by positive fan mail and letters from people in similar situations. At The American, Amberley and Tate share a romantic kiss. Tina expresses how proud she is of Amberley for how far she has come in the last eighteen months, saying "You may have lost the use of your legs but it's opened up your heart". Tina tells Amberley to ride like the wind as she makes her way out.

Amberley is a professional barrel racer to this day, she and her horse Power were 0.6 seconds from winning The American Rodeo not long after her accident and recovery. She also tours the country as a motivational speaker.

== Cast ==
- Spencer Locke as Amberley Snyder
- Bailey Chase as Cory Snyder, Amberley's father
- Alyvia Alyn Lind as Autumn Snyder, Amberley's younger sister
- Max Ehrich as Tate Watkins
- Corbin Bleu as Diego, the physiotherapist
- Kathleen Rose Perkins as Stacey
- Sherri Shepherd as Felice
- Missi Pyle as Tina Snyder, Amberley's mother
- Raleigh Cain as Emmy, Amberley's best friend
- Mitchell Hoog as JC Snyder, Amberley's younger brother
- Barbara Alyn Woods as Jenna Walters

== Production ==
On July 29, 2018, it was announced that production had begun on a new Netflix film entitled Walk Ride Rodeo about the life of paralyzed rodeo champion Amberley Snyder. It was also announced that Missi Pyle, Spencer Locke, Bailey Chase, Sherri Shepherd, Raleigh Cain, Mitchell Hoog, and John-Paul Howard would star in the film.

Principal photography began in New Mexico in July 2018.

=== Stunts ===
Snyder acted as her own stunt double for all of the post-crash riding sequences in the film, while her younger sister Autumn performed the pre-crash stunts. Snyder's barrel-racing horse, Power, plays itself in the film.
