= SpongeBob SquarePants: Creature from the Krusty Krab =

2006 video game

- North American Windows cover art
- Developers: Blitz Games; WayForward Technologies (handheld); AWE Games (PC)
- Publisher: THQ
- Directors: Chris Viggers (home console); Marc Gomez (GBA); Rob Buchanan (DS)
- Producers: Team RocFISH (home console); Nick Hyman; Armando Soto (GBA)
- Designers: Alex Johnson; Luke Nockles; Lynsey Graham; Paul Stockley; Jonathan Tainsh; Peter Theophilus; Mark Witts (home console); Marc Gomez; Aric McGhee; Roger Oda (GBA); Rob Buchanan; Michael Herbster (DS)
- Programmers: Chris Allen; Chris Bell; Steve Bond; Alastair Graham; Nigel Higgs; Nathan Pritchard; Johnny Trainor; Alex Vokes; Matthew Waddilove (home console); Raymond L. Maple (GBA); Larry Holdaway (DS)
- Artists: Stephen Thomson (home console); Pablo Ruvalcaba (handheld); Luke Brookshier (DS)
- Writers: Richard Boon; James Parker; Chris Bateman; Steven Banks
- Composers: Matt Black (home console); Martin Schjøler (handheld)
- Series: SpongeBob SquarePants
- Platforms: Microsoft Windows; Game Boy Advance; GameCube; PlayStation 2 Nintendo DS; Wii
- Release: Microsoft Windows: NA: August 15, 2006; GBA, GCN, PS2: NA: October 18, 2006; AU: November 2, 2006; EU: November 10, 2006; JP: March 15, 2007 (PS2); Nintendo DS: NA: October 18, 2006; EU: November 24, 2006; AU: November 30, 2006; Wii: NA: November 19, 2006; AU: December 12, 2006; EU: December 15, 2006; JP: March 15, 2007
- Genres: Action-adventure, platform
- Mode: Single-player

SpongeBob SquarePants: Creature from the Krusty Krab is an action-adventure platform game released for Microsoft Windows, Game Boy Advance, GameCube, PlayStation 2, Nintendo DS and Wii by THQ. The PS2, GameCube, and Wii versions are all ports of the same game developed by Blitz Games, while the Game Boy Advance, Nintendo DS, and PC versions were separate games developed by WayForward Technologies and AWE Games respectively. It is based on the Nickelodeon animated series SpongeBob SquarePants. It stars the title character, Patrick Star and Plankton as they journey to nine different worlds, supposedly inside the dreams of the characters. The Wii version was a North American launch title. It is also the first SpongeBob game released in Japan (PlayStation 2 and Wii versions), but was released under the title SpongeBob (スポンジ・ボブ Suponjibobu), to mark it as the first video game in the SpongeBob series to have a Japanese release. The PC version of the game got re-released as SpongeBob SquarePants: Nighty Nightmare.

== Gameplay ==
Players have access to three playable characters during the game, SpongeBob SquarePants, Patrick Starfishman (Patrick Star in superhero form), and Sheldon J. Plankton, and must guide them through nine levels of play in a dreamworld. Four different types of gameplay have been incorporated into the game, known as flying, rampaging, racing, and platforming. During flying sections, the game sets obstacles, one in front of another, and the player must maneuver past them. In most cases, the game will tell the player which way to fly (up, down, left, and right). On the Wii, the player uses the controller like an actual plane control stick. The most common cases of this is when SpongeBob uses his plane to attack a giant-sized Plankton. In rampage levels, the player controls a giant sized Plankton and uses special powers and moves to destroy everything in their path. The player's laser power is indicated by a bar on the right side of the screen, which refills after use. The Wii version features controller movements that respectively activate moves. Racing gameplay is similar to most racing games; it is featured in both the air and the ground's gameplay, fuel must be collected in order to keep the player's vehicle running. The platforming gameplay is spread throughout the game, such as when Plankton must escape from a live Krabby Patty or when Patrick Starfishman saves Bikini Bottom from his evil form, Dreaded Patrick.

== Plot ==
The entire storyline takes place inside the dreams of SpongeBob SquarePants, Patrick Star and Sheldon Plankton, where each individual must survive the most bizarre adventures.

I. "Diesel Dreaming"

In SpongeBob's dream, his bed transforms into a hot rod and he drives it around a track across Bikini Bottom, which now resembles an automobile-hot rod paradise inspired by the works of Ed Roth.

While gloating that he won a practice race and finally obtained his license, SpongeBob and his hot rod get ran over by Plankton, causing him to drop and lose his license. You are then introduced to basic platform mechanics by Mrs. Puff. After getting his license back, he is challenged by Piston Patrick (another rival racer) in “Some like it hot rod.” He beats him narrowly and once again he is ran over by Plankton, but this time completely destroying his hot rod. After finding parts needed to repair it, you finally race Plankton – and win. With it being SpongeBob's luck, he is run over again, this time by Gary. [The last wave of platforming in this level (dream) is searching for upgrades for the Hot Rod. As usual you deal with goons and avoid obstacles.]

You race Gary with the additional upgrades, and win. Distracted with the feeling of victory, SpongeBob accidentally drives into an unnoticed pit. SpongeBob nose dives through the pit falls until he reaches the bottom, where he is eaten by an Alaskan Bull Worm. While observing his unfortunate new surroundings, he encounters Old Man Jenkins, who is building an airplane. He says that the residents of the worm (or village people) are being held hostage and have been trying to help him complete the plane with spare parts. Going deeper within the worm & rescuing all captive villagers, SpongeBob and Old Man Jenkins finish the plane and attempt their escape. However, after coming up the esophagus, the worm shuts his mouth, thus leaving a cliffhanger. (Questioning their success of escape)

II. "The Girth of a Hero"

Afterwards the story shifts to a comic book-like world revolving around local superhero Starfish-Man, who everyone in the story resembles.

Like every hero with a nemesis, Starfish-Man pursues the villainous "Dreaded Patrick", whose evil plan is to turn the city into a giant shrine. This includes: self-portrait posters (which you must remove to advance the game), likeness statues made of gold, and torch altars. Starfish-Man appears at a train depot and sees a civilian tied up on the main tracks (with an oncoming train in pursuit).

After saving the civilian and returning his scattered clothing, the mayor informs Starfish-Man that they need to work together to clean up the city. In response he collects laundry detergent. He then gets invited to a final showdown by Dreaded Patrick in his evil lair.

Starfish-Man enters the lair and finds a civilian tied to a rocket near the top floor. He gets on an elevator. (while being challenged by DP to see who could get there faster.) You take on multiple levels of henchmen ranging in size. Starfish-Man reaches the top and attempts a rescue. However, he fails to see a surprise attack, is knocked out, and gets tied to the rocket originally intended for the other starfish, which launches into outer space. The rocket hits an asteroid, a piece of which falls to Earth and traps Dreaded Patrick. In outer space, Starfishman manages to untie himself from the rocket after flying around. He shoots asteroids threatening a space station and continues to fly around until he meets up with a U.F.O. in the shape of a patty. He shoots off its wings, destroying it. Then Patrick returns to Earth while trying to figure out how to stop the rocket.

III. "Super-Sized Patty"

In Plankton's dream, he zaps a crumb of a Krabby Patty with his Enlargatron Ray to learn the secret formula. However, the ray's coordinates are inaccurate, causing the Krabby Patty to overgrow and mutate into a vicious monster. Plankton decides to fight back with size but the inaccurate ray only makes him the height of an average citizen, which was not enough to dwarf the patty. Plankton, arming himself with his freeze ray (aka "The Despiculator" as Plankton calls it) for protection, is pursued by the patty throughout Bikini Bottom. Plankton eventually loses the patty by hiding, but then gloats about his victory, allowing the patty to find and crush him. Plankton then awakes to find the giant Krabby Patty sleeping beside him. As he sneaks away, Karen's wake-up call awakens the patty. Plankton sets the accurate coordinates for his ray and transforms himself into a giant, atomic-powered mutant plankton. The patty flees and Plankton gives chase, destroying Bikini Bottom in his wake. He finds the patty hiding in a skyscraper twice and destroys each floor to force it out. Meanwhile, SpongeBob and Jenkins fly out of the worm's mouth and find Plankton. The giant patty escapes Plankton's clutches and clings onto SpongeBob's plane, with an enraged Plankton in pursuit.

SpongeBob tries to avoid Plankton while devising a plan to defeat him. After a long pursuit through the city, including the sewers and a construction site, SpongeBob engages Plankton on a radio tower. SpongeBob destroys the support bolts to make the tower unstable, causing Plankton to fall on his rear. As Plankton aches in pain, SpongeBob feels sorry for him and decides to help him up, which allows Plankton to grab the plane. Just then, Starfishman lands his rocket and teams up with Mermaid Man and the Bikini Bottom Defense Force to battle Plankton and rescue SpongeBob. He defeats a small army of plankton minions to reach an experimental shrink ray, which he uses to undo Plankton's transformation and save his friend. After Plankton is shrunk, he accompanies Patrick and SpongeBob into a dream bubble, where they meet a doctor with a Krabby Patty for a head.

The doctor explains that the reason for their bizarre dreams is because they all ate a Krabby Patty before falling asleep; the chemical composition of the patties affected their biorhythms and caused a reaction that resulted in the dreams. SpongeBob then asks the doctor how he knows so much about Krabby Patties; the doctor strips his outfit off to reveal that he is the Krabby Patty in their own dreams. In order to wake up, SpongeBob, Patrick, and Plankton decide to chase after him and head into the final level where they race against one another for the Krabby Patty trophy in a bizarre, nightmare-like racetrack. The game starts off with SpongeBob as the only choice available. To unlock Patrick and Plankton, the player must collect Sleepy Seeds spread throughout the game.

=== Endings ===
The level's ending depends on which character the player wins with:

- SpongeBob celebrates his victory, and overlooks his dream bubble thinking that it was all just another dream. He pops out and brings the Krabby Patty to the Krusty Krab, chopping the patty into average-sized patties for the customers. SpongeBob then notices that he and the customers have Gary's shell on their backs, and meows.
- Patrick suddenly appears at the Krusty Krab where everyone is celebrating his victory. He attempts to eat the Krabby Patty but it escapes and Patrick ends up ramming into a door, causing him to see multiple Garys.
- Plankton successfully takes over Bikini Bottom and drives the Krusty Krab out of business with his own Krabby Patty franchise. However, the talking patty from before warns him that "what the patty gives, the patty can take away". Patties then begin raining down and crushing Plankton's empire, one of which has a familiar set of snail-eyes that crushes the Chum Bucket after bouncing off a run-down Krusty Krab.

In the ultimate ending, SpongeBob, Patrick, and Plankton wake up in one another's dream and it is revealed that this was all Gary's dream, as he was the one who ate the Krabby Patty. After waking up, he goes around town and sees SpongeBob, Patrick, and Plankton doing things similar to his dream before returning home to rest. SpongeBob then brings back a Krabby Patty for Gary, but SpongeBob refuses to let him eat it because it may give him nightmares. Gary then watches as SpongeBob has a "conversation" with the patty. As SpongeBob prepares to eat the patty, he is eaten by the Alaskan Bull Worm, causing Gary to faint into slumber.

== Development ==
Developer Blitz Games had a meeting with staff from THQ during the 2005 E3 trade show, where they were asked to oversee and develop the SpongeBob SquarePants franchise. THQ staff revealed that they had an "intimate" business relationship with Nintendo, and that Nintendo had expressed an interest in having a SpongeBob game published on their new console, the Wii, which at that point was still known by its development name Revolution. Blitz came up with several styles of play during development, some of which did not become part of the finished product. In particular, shooting sections using the Wiimote had been considered, but license holders Nickelodeon were uncomfortable with them due to SpongeBob SquarePants being a cartoon. Due to Blitz developing their own middleware with a focus on providing cross-platform compatibility, the main sections of the game such as driving and platforming are the same for each console version of the game. The mini game controls work differently on the Wii version of the game, the Nintendo console was the main focus of development. Extra development time was spent configuring the control methods for the Wiimote and the standard controllers used on the other consoles.

The game was announced prior to the 2006 E3 show, and was first shown to journalists at that event.

== Reception ==
Reception

Aggregate scores
Aggregator	Score
GameRankings	GC: 69.00% PS2: 62.44% Wii: 58.83% GBA: 72.50% DS: 56.33%
Metacritic	GC: 74/100; Wii: 57/100; PS2: 56/100; DS: 56/100

Review scores
Publication	Score
Eurogamer	Wii: 5 out of 10
Game Informer	Wii: 6.75 out of 10
GamesRadar+	Wii: 3/5
GameZone	GC: 6 out of 10; PS2: 5 out of 10
IGN	Wii: 4.5 out of 10; DS: 5.5 out of 10
Nintendo Power	GC: 8.5 out of 10; Wii: 7 out of 10
X-Play	Wii: 2/5
Play Magazine	GC: 7 out of 10; PS2: 7 out of 10; Wii: 7 out of 10

The game was nominated for an Annie Award for best animated video game in 2006. It also won the award for Favorite Video Game at the 2007 Kids' Choice Awards. Nintendo Power referred to the game as the "most ambitious and most successful SpongeBob game to date" in their December 2006 issue. Some positive aspects noted by reviewers about it included the variety in gameplay, responsive controls on the GC and PS2 versions, straightforward and solid level design, and the game's overall ambition, while negative points included subpar graphics, especially on the GC version, overly long and poorly paced platforming and racing levels, and the occasionally unresponsive motion controls on the Wii version.

Several reviewers also noted that the fictional world does not resemble Bikini Bottom or the cartoon itself, that the story and overall tone is slightly darker and more surreal compared to previous games, and that the game does not "feel" like a SpongeBob SquarePants title.
