= Flushed Away =

2006 animated adventure comedy film

- British theatrical release poster
- Directed by: David Bowers; Sam Fell
- Screenplay by: Dick Clement; Ian La Frenais; Chris Lloyd; Joe Keenan; Will Davies
- Story by: Sam Fell; Peter Lord; Dick Clement; Ian La Frenais
- Produced by: Cecil Kramer; David Sproxton; Peter Lord
- Starring: Hugh Jackman; Kate Winslet; Jean Reno; Bill Nighy; Andy Serkis; Shane Richie; Ian McKellen
- Edited by: Erika Dapkewicz (Note: Credited as Eric Dapkewicz; Dapkewicz came out as transgender and changed her name in the 2010s.); John Venzon
- Music by: Harry Gregson-Williams
- Production companies: DreamWorks Animation; Aardman Features
- Distributed by: Paramount Pictures (Note: In July 2014, the film's distribution rights were purchased by DreamWorks Animation from Paramount Pictures and transferred to 20th Century Fox before reverting to Universal Pictures in 2018 following NBCUniversal's acquisition of DreamWorks Animation in 2016.)
- Release dates: 22 October 2006 (Tokyo); 3 November 2006 (United States); 1 December 2006 (United Kingdom)
- Running time: 85 minutes
- Countries: United Kingdom; United States
- Language: English
- Budget: $149 million
- Box office: $178.3 million

Flushed Away is a 2006 animated adventure comedy film directed by David Bowers and Sam Fell, and written by Dick Clement, Ian La Frenais, Chris Lloyd, Joe Keenan, and Will Davies. Produced by DreamWorks Animation SKG and Aardman Features, the film stars the voices of Hugh Jackman, Kate Winslet, Ian McKellen, Shane Richie, Bill Nighy, Andy Serkis, and Jean Reno. In the film, a fancy rat named Roddy St. James (Jackman) is flushed down the toilet in his Kensington apartment and befriends a scavenger named Rita Malone (Winslet) in order to go home.

Flushed Away was the third and final of three DreamWorks Animation and Aardman Animations co-productions following Chicken Run (2000) and Wallace & Gromit: The Curse of the Were-Rabbit (2005). Director Fell conceived the concept of rats falling in love in the sewers while working on Chicken Run. In 2001, Fell developed a story and pitched it to DreamWorks. The project was first announced in July 2002, followed by comedy writing duo Clement and La Frenais being contracted to write the script, which had the working title Ratropolis. In 2003, Bowers joined Fell as co-director. It was the first Aardman Animations film animated using 3D CGI animation instead of using stop-motion claymation, this was because using actual water on plasticine models can damage them.

The film's premiere was held on 22 October 2006 during the Tokyo International Film Festival, followed by a worldwide release in the United States by Paramount Pictures on 3 November 2006 and in the United Kingdom on 1 December 2006. It received positive reviews from critics, but was a box-office disappointment, grossing $178 million against a $149 million production budget, resulting in an estimated loss of $109 million for the studios. The failure led to Aardman ending its collaboration deal with DreamWorks. The film received nominations for the BAFTA Award and Critics' Choice Award for Best Animated Feature. It received eight nominations at the 34th Annie Awards, winning five, including for the screenplay and, for McKellen's Voice Acting.

== Plot ==
Roddy St. James is a pet rat who lives in a large Kensington flat. One day after his owners go on holiday, he takes advantage of being alone. That night, a sloppy sewer rat named Sid bursts out of the kitchen's sink and decides to stay and watch the 2006 FIFA World Cup final. Imagining Sid taking over his life, Roddy demands Sid to leave, but Sid refuses and starts to treat him as a butler. He decides to take advantage of this and attempts to trick Sid into thinking that the apartment's Jacuzzi-brand toilet is an actual Jacuzzi. Despite being sloppy, Sid knows about toilets. He pretends to be tricked before pushing Roddy into the toilet and pulling the lever. After landing in London's sewer, he discovers Ratropolis, a sewer city made out of various bits of junk, resembling London.

A pirate rat tells him to find Rita Malone, an enterprising scavenger who works the drains in her boat, the Jammy Dodger, and who might be able to send him home. Roddy and Rita are abducted by rats Spike and Whitey and brought before their boss, the Toad, as Rita stole back a ruby that was scavenged by her father. The Toad has an obsessive hatred of rodents. He plans to have Roddy and Rita frozen with liquid nitrogen after Roddy accidentally destroys part of the Toad’s British porcelain memorabilia, but the pair escape. Rita takes the ruby and a unique electric master cable needed to control Ratropolis' sewer floodgates.

Roddy deduces that the ruby is actually a glass replica and easily breaks it, enraging Rita, who attacks him. Roddy offers Rita a real ruby from his owner's jewelry box if she takes him back to Kensington, to which she agrees. The pair stop to visit her family before setting off. During Roddy's stay, Rita's younger brother, Liam, proposes to her and their father that they give Roddy to the Toad in exchange for money, but Rita and their father refuse to. Overhearing this, Roddy misinterprets that Rita is planning to double-cross him, so he reneges on the deal and steals the Jammy Dodger. When Rita catches up to him, she clears up the misunderstanding. The pair evade pursuit from Spike, Whitey, and their accomplices.

Tired of his henchmens' failures, the Toad sends for his French cousin, Le Frog. The Toad recounts to Le Frog where his hatred of rodents originated, which he has told to Le Frog multiple times: decades before the events of the film, the Toad was Prince Charles' favourite pet out of all of his pets. They did many things together until Charles' birthday, where he was given a rat as a gift. Over time, Charles no longer favoured the Toad and one of his servants flushed the Toad down a toilet. Le Frog and his henchmen intercept Roddy and Rita to retrieve the cable, but the duo manages to escape to Roddy's flat, though the Jammy Dodger is destroyed.

Roddy delivers Rita the promised ruby as well as an emerald to build a new Jammy Dodger, then shows her around his flat. At first, she thinks that he has family, but when she notices his cage and recognizes Sid, she realizes that Roddy is a pet. Rita tries to persuade Roddy to come with her, but he is too proud to admit his loneliness. Rita flushes herself down the apartment's toilet only to be kidnapped, and the Toad takes back the master cable. Roddy joins Sid to watch the game. When Sid warns him not to drink too much before half-time, he realizes that the Toad plans to open the floodgates during half-time, when every human in London will use their toilets, allowing the wave of drainage to wash away every rat in Ratropolis. Roddy entrusts Sid with his home and has Sid flush him down the toilet again. He frees Rita, and together they defeat the Toad and his henchmen by getting the Toad and Le Frog's tongues stuck to moving gears and freezing the wave of drainage with liquid nitrogen. Hailed as a hero, Roddy agrees to stay in Ratropolis with Rita. Soon after, the two, as well as Rita's family, set off on the Jammy Dodger II.

In a mid-credits scene, when Tabitha, the daughter of Roddy's owners, finds Sid on the couch after she and her parents return from holiday, she introduces him to their new cat, much to his horror.

== Voice cast ==
- Hugh Jackman as Roddy St. James, a pampered pet rat who lives in a Kensington luxury apartment with a wealthy British family. He is flushed down the toilet by Sid into the sewer drains.
- Kate Winslet as Rita Malone, a street-wise and rather aloof scavenger rat and the oldest child of her large family. She is the captain of the Jammy Dodger and Roddy's love interest.
- Ian McKellen as the Toad, an unhinged, pompous, and aristocratic cane toad who wants to get rid of the entire population of Ratropolis to make room for his hundreds of offspring. For his performance, Ian McKellen won the Annie Award for Voice Acting in a Feature Production.
- Andy Serkis as Spike, one of the Toad's two top hench-rats. He is the quicker-witted and more aggressive of the two.
- Bill Nighy as Whitey, another of the Toad's two top hench-rats. Whitey is an albino rat, and Spike's partner. Unlike Spike, Whitey is sympathetic and less vicious but is also ignorant and gullible.
- Jean Reno as Le Frog, the Toad's sarcastic French cousin. He refers to the Toad as "my warty English cousin". He masters martial arts and is the leader of a team of hench-frogs.
- Shane Richie as Sid, an overweight and lazy sewer rat from the sewer drain. He is the one who flushes Roddy down the toilet and is an acquaintance of Rita and her family.
- David Suchet and Kathy Burke as Mr. and Mrs. Malone respectively, Rita's parents
- Miriam Margolyes as Grandmum Malone, Rita's grandmother who has a crush on Roddy mistaking him for Tom Jones.
- Christopher Fairbank as Thimblenose Ted, another hench-rat who serves as the Toad's third-best enforcer after Spike and Whitey.
  - Fairbank also voices the cockroach living in the Malone household.

== Production ==
The idea for a film about rats that fall in love in sewers was proposed by animator Sam Fell during the production of Aardman Animation's Chicken Run (2000). At the time, Aardman Animations encouraged everyone at the company to come up with ideas for features for the DreamWorks Pictures and DreamWorks Animation partnership. In 2001, Fell, along with development executive Mike Cooper and producer Peter Lord, developed the concept into a story before pitching it to DreamWorks. The film was first announced in July 2002, and in what was then a surprise move, it was revealed as Aardman Animations' first-ever all-3D CGI animation film. Lord described the pitch as "The African Queen with the gender roles reversed". After the film was announced, comic writing duo Dick Clement and Ian La Frenais were contracted to write the script, which had the working title Ratropolis. In 2003, David Bowers joined in to direct the film with Fell. Other writers were also later brought in to help write the script, including Frasier writers and showrunners Christopher Lloyd and Joe Keenan, and Twins and Johnny English writer William Davies.

Traditionally, Aardman Animations had used stop-motion claymation for its animated feature films, but it was too complex for the animators to re-create water with this technique, and using actual water would have damaged plasticine models. It also would have been expensive to composite 3D computer animation into shots that include water, of which there are multiple in the film, so the studio chose to make Flushed Away its first-ever all-3D computer animated film. It was the third and final of three films co-produced by Aardman and DreamWorks Animation. Aardman's turbulent experience with DreamWorks Animation during the making of this film and The Curse of the Were-Rabbit led to the split between the two studios.

== Soundtrack ==
On Halloween (31 October) 2006, the Flushed Away: Music from the Motion Picture soundtrack was released by Astralwerks.

== Home media ==
Flushed Away was released on DVD on 20 February 2007. It includes behind-the-scenes, deleted info, Jammy Dodger videos and all-new slug songs. It was released in the UK on 2 April 2007, where it was also packaged with a plasticine 'Slug Farm' kit. The film was released on Blu-ray by Universal Pictures Home Entertainment on 4 June 2019 around the world except for the UK. As of October 2010, 4.9 million units were sold.

In July 2014, the film's distribution rights were purchased by DreamWorks Animation from Paramount Pictures and transferred to 20th Century Fox before reverting to Universal Pictures in 2018, following NBCUniversal's acquisition of DreamWorks Animation in 2016.

== Reception ==
=== Critical response ===
Flushed Away has an approval rating of 73% on Rotten Tomatoes and an average rating of 6.9/10, based on 137 reviews. The site's critical consensus reads, "Clever and appealing for both children and adults, Flushed Away marks a successful entry into digitally animated features for Aardman Animations." Metacritic, which assigns a weighted average score to reviews from mainstream critics, gives the film a score of 74 out of 100 based on 28 reviews, indicating "generally favorable reviews". Audiences polled by CinemaScore gave the film an average grade of "B+" on an A+ to F scale.

Todd McCarthy of Variety gave the film a negative review, saying "As directed by David Bowers and Sam Fell, first-time feature helmers with long-term Aardman affiliations, the film boasts undeniably smart and eye-catching qualities that are significantly diluted by the relentlessly frantic and overbearing behavior of most characters; someone is always loudly imposing himself upon another, to diminishing returns of enjoyment." Owen Gleiberman of Entertainment Weekly gave the film a B+, saying "Flushed Away lacks the action-contraption dottiness of a Wallace and Gromit adventure, but it hits its own sweet spot of demented delight." James Berardinelli of ReelViews gave the film three out of four stars, saying "It's better than 90% of the animated fare of the last few years. It's refreshing not to have to qualify the movie's appeal by appending the words, 'for the kids'." Jan Stuart of Newsday gave the film two out of four stars, saying "Despite the efforts of five writers and Aardman's trademark puppets, with their malleable eyebrows and cheeks bulging like those of a mumps sufferer, none of these characters are particularly endearing." Ann Hornaday of The Washington Post gave the film a positive review, saying "Flushed Away, Aardman's first computer-generated cartoon, does away with the clay but leaves the craft and emotion intact, resulting in a film that earns its place among the Aardman classics." Peter Hartlaub of the San Francisco Chronicle gave the film three out of four stars, saying "The short attention spans of directors David Bowers and Sam Fell are mostly forgivable because the movie is filled with so many entertaining characters."

Richard Corliss of Time gave the film a negative review, saying, "Deficient in the comedy of reticence and discouragement that is Aardman's (or maybe just Nick Park's) unique strength. I don't want to say the Englishmen were corrupted, but I think they allowed their strongest, quirkiest instincts to be tethered." Ted Fry of The Seattle Times gave the film three and a half stars out of four, saying, "Fans of Wallace and Gromit may be puzzled by a visual disconnect in Flushed Away. They will certainly, however, be delighted by the unrelenting whimsy and fast-paced gags of a story that never slows down to think about where it's going next." Ty Burr of The Boston Globe gave the film two and a half stars out of five, saying, "Kids will probably be in stinky-sewage heaven with the new computer-animated critter comedy Flushed Away, but even they may realize they're up the proverbial creek in a boat with a faulty motor." Jack Mathews of the New York Daily News gave the film two and a half stars out of four, saying, "Though Flushed Away duplicates the stop-motion, clay animation look of Aardman's earlier Chicken Run and Wallace & Gromit, it was made using computer software, and its liberated action sequences are truly dazzling."

=== Box office ===
Flushed Away collected $64.6 million in the United States, which was below the average of other CGI films from DreamWorks Animation, and $113.6 million from international markets for a worldwide total of $178.2 million, making it the 24th highest-grossing film of 2006, and the sixth highest-grossing animated film of 2006. The film opened at number three in its first weekend, with $18,814,323, behind Borat and The Santa Clause 3: The Escape Clause. Produced on a budget of $149 million, poor box office reception resulted in a $109 million write-down for DreamWorks Animation, and in turn, a termination of the partnership with Aardman Animations.

== Video game ==
Coinciding with the film's release, a video game adaptation was released for the PlayStation 2, GameCube, Game Boy Advance, and Nintendo DS. Although it received negative reviews from critics, the game received an Annie Award for Best Animated Video Game.
