= Flushed Away (video game) =

2006 video game

- PAL region cover art for PlayStation 2
- Developers: Vicious Cycle Software (Note: As Monkey Bar Games); Art Co., Ltd (NDS); Altron (GBA)
- Publisher: D3 Publisher
- Producer: Mike Pearson
- Designer: Jeff Friedlander
- Programmer: Timothy Randall
- Artist: Ben Lichius
- Composers: Rod Abernethy; Jason Graves
- Engine: Vicious Engine
- Platforms: PlayStation 2, GameCube, Game Boy Advance, Nintendo DS
- Release: NA: October 24, 2006; EU: December 1, 2006; JP: June 28, 2007 (DS)
- Genre: Action-adventure
- Modes: Single-player, multiplayer

Flushed Away is a 2006 action-adventure video game based on the animated film of the same name for the GameCube, PlayStation 2, Game Boy Advance, and Nintendo DS. It was developed by Vicious Cycle Software and published by D3 Publisher. It was released in Japan for the Nintendo DS as Volume 17 of the Simple series.

== Gameplay ==
Flushed Away is based around platform gameplay, with the player controlling the two main characters from the film and guiding them through hazard-filled environments. Environments and enemies are based on those in the film, although several areas and creatures not seen in the film are also included. Interspersed throughout the game are mini-game sequences involving shooting enemies with a turret that fires golf balls, and taking control of a boat in a pursuit sequence. Some multiplayer minigames are also included, based around puzzle and shoot-'em-up mechanics.

== Plot ==
The plot of the game differs heavily from the film. Roderick "Roddy" St. James lives in an apartment, in Kensington, with his owners, until they go away for a holiday. Gilbert and Sullivan, who were only seen in the video game, all help Roddy out with his obstacle course and fencing skills. As they explore more, they hear an explosion coming from the kitchen. In the Kitchen, they find that Sid has raided it and is planning to stay. Roddy schemes to get rid of him, but quickly backfires as Sid flushes him down the toilet, thinking of it as a trap. As soon as Roddy ends up in another world, Ratropolis, he bumps into Socketset, who gives him his first task: collect a jar of flies.

Meanwhile, Rita sneaks into the Toad's lair, grabs the ruby and after escaping Spike and Whitey, escapes on her Jammy Dodger. Roddy investigates but bumps into Rita, who then decide to team up to escape Spike, Whitey and the other rats. After escaping the rats, using ammunition and speed, Rita swerves the Jammy Dodger out of control and crashes onto a platform, where Spike and Whitey capture them both and take them to the Toad. They are sent to the freezer, locked up, and be frozen for theft of the precious ruby, but Roddy and Rita escape and the Toad orders his hench-rats to pursue the escapees down.

Roddy desperately tries to catch up to Rita, while avoiding either Spike, Whitey and the Toad's hench-rats along the way. He makes it to the bridge, jumps off the walkway and lands onto the Jammy Dodger, spraining his back while trying to escape the hench-rats. Rita allows Roddy to stay on the Jammy Dodger, as he had dropped in. He then, painfully, thanks Rita for the lift.

Later, Roddy is claimed "The Chosen One" by the prophet rat and is told to speak with Charlie Wu, who gives Roddy a rescue mission, to save the orphanage from flooding. In order to do this, he and Rita must journey, via the Jammy Dodger. They reach the clogged drain and as soon as Roddy launches the catapult, it releases the water and it starts draining too fast, giving Roddy and Rita the signal to get clear. Charlie Wu is pleased that his children are safe. Then, Socketset gives Roddy another job: Collect another jar full of flies.

Upon exploring the caves, Roddy finds a deeper cave, where he comes across an arachnid, who sees Roddy as lunch. Roddy defeats her and then retrieves a new sword. After a few side missions, from Socketset and Charlie Wu, Roddy ventures through Little Soho and Chinatown, to complete his side tasks. As Roddy and Rita venture more on the Jammy Dodger, they hear a lot of cheering and shouting going on. It turns out that England has made it to the World Cup Finals and the rats go down to Little Soho to stir things up. After encountering hooligans, Roddy finds a door that is blocked by wooden and metal crates. Eventually, after the puzzle is solved and the door is unlocked, both Roddy and Rita can continue their journey, but they find that the fans have decided to have a battle called "Castle Siege". In order for England to win, Germany's flags must be eliminated. England wins and Germany loses, so Roddy and Rita continue their journey.

Along the way, they encounter Le Frog and his hench-frogs. As soon as Rita speeds and crashes the Jammy Dodger on the dock, completely knocking Le Frog and his hench-frogs off their feet. Le Frog and his henchmen split apart, so does Roddy and Rita. Roddy faces Le Frog and then defeats him. Upon leaving, Le Frog gets up and tries to get Roddy back, but is knocked out by a falling chandelier, that had the rope cut by Roddy's sword. As Roddy and Rita leave, they are captured by Spike and Whitey and are taken to the Toad's lair.

Once they arrive at the Toad's lair, the Toad tells Roddy and Rita his greatest plan to flush all the rodents, with a giant wave, by opening the floodgate. However, Roddy and Rita soon tell the Toad that thousands of toilets, in London, are used, as many people are watching the football on TV. When it is halftime, many people will go to the toilets, dispose of their liquids and then flush it down the drain. When the toilets start flushing, it will cause a huge wave that will destroy the city the rats live. The Toad, enraged about having his plan being revealed, kicks both Roddy and Rita off, unaware that they are hanging on to each other, and then tells his hench-rats to stop Roddy and Rita from escaping.

The final battle occurs when Roddy is faced with dodging the Toad's throwable objects, by hitting each console three times. Then, Rita is faced to fight Fat Barry, Lady Killer and Thimblenose Ted, by using, everything she can, to weaken them and make it easy for them to take a hit. She also uses some lights, blinding Thimblenose Ted and by blowing Lady Killer's wig off his head with a wind from the vent. After the hench-rats are defeated, Roddy and Rita's final task is to defeat the Toad. Rita's bungee manages to weaken the supports and the Toad is left hanging, with his tongue stuck to something, as he is defeated. Afterwards, Rita is asked by Roddy if she needs a first mate, which she obliges and runs off. Roddy runs after her and lands perfectly on the Jammy Dodger, with Rita controlling the Jammy Dodger, allowing it to speed up, making Roddy fall over. Rita then tells Roddy that he can be the captain, every other day. As the screen fades out, the words 'The End' with a question mark at the end, appear on the center of the screen, ending the game on a cliffhanger.

== Reception ==
Reception

Aggregate score
Aggregator	Score			
Aggregator	DS	GBA	GameCube	PS2
Metacritic	47/100	43/100	47/100	43/100

Review scores
Publication	Score			
Publication	DS	GBA	GameCube	PS2
Eurogamer	N/A	N/A	N/A	2/10
Famitsu	21/40	N/A	N/A	N/A
GameSpot	6/10	3.6/10	4.3/10	4.3/10
GamesRadar+	2/5	N/A	N/A	3/5
IGN	4/10	5/10	4/10	4/10
Nintendo Power	N/A	N/A	6.5/10	N/A
PlayStation Official Magazine – UK	N/A	N/A	N/A	5/10

The game received "generally unfavorable reviews" on all platforms according to video game review aggregator Metacritic. In Japan, Famitsu gave the DS version a score of one five, one six, and two fives, for a total of 21 out of 40.

Despite the mixed reviews, in 2006 the game won an Annie Award for Best Animated Video Game.
