= Amberley Snyder =

Barrel racing champion (born 1991)

- Occupation: Rodeo competitor

Significant horses
- Power, Wrangler, Legacy

Website
- www.amberleysnyder.org

Amberley Snyder (born January 29, 1991) is an American Professional rodeo cowgirl who specializes in barrel racing. She also competed in pole bending and breakaway roping. In 2010, Snyder suffered a car crash that paralyzed her from the waist down. It took months of therapy and tears before she finally adjusted, after her first ride on Power (her horse) she wouldn't go into the arena, until she got interviewed on the news. She eventually adapted to the injury and kept competing. In 2015, she competed at a high level when she won a fan exemption to compete at The American Rodeo. Snyder is now a motivational speaker.

== Early life ==
Amberley Snyder was born on January 29, 1991, in California to Tina and Cory Snyder. She is the second-oldest of her five siblings, Ashley, JC, Taylor, Aubrey, and Autumn.

=== Rodeo career ===
Snyder first rode a horse at the age of three and began competing in rodeo barrel racing when she was seven years old. After that, she spent summer weekends barrel racing, pole bending, and breakaway roping. She won the 2009 All-Around Cowgirl World Championship in the National Little Britches Rodeo Association. She was the 2009–2010 Utah State FFA President.

=== Car crash and recovery ===
On January 10, 2010, Snyder was driving from Utah to the National Western Stock Show in Denver, Colorado, and did not fasten her seat belt after a gas station stop in Rawlins, Wyoming. Less than 10 miles from the gas station, she looked down to check her map, drifted into the other lane, overcorrected, and her truck slid off the road and rolled seven times. She was thrown from the truck and slammed into a fence post, which crushed her T-12 vertebra and left her paralyzed from the waist down. With the help of physical therapy, and a seat belt on her saddle, she was later able to resume riding and competing in rodeo a year and a half later. She transferred from Snow College to Utah State University where she was captain of the school's National Intercollegiate Rodeo Association team. She also won the Shane Drury "Nothin' But Try" scholarship in 2014.

In 2015, Amberley won a fan exemption to compete in RFD-TV's The American Rodeo at AT&T Stadium in Arlington, Texas, and made a time of 15.3 seconds with her horse Power, only 0.6 seconds slower than the winning time. In 2016, she was in the top five for the Rocky Mountain Pro Rodeo Association, and she also won her Women's Professional Rodeo Association card in 2016, and now competes in the RAM Wilderness Circuit.

Snyder interviewed in 2022

== Later career ==
Snyder works as a motivational speaker, and posts a weekly "Wheelchair Wednesday" video on social media to showcase everyday tasks that have become more challenging. She has also written an illustrated children's book Walk Ride Rodeo about overcoming adversity.

== Film portrayals ==
Snyder's story was portrayed in a Netflix biopic Walk. Ride. Rodeo., released on March 8, 2019. She performed all the post-crash horse stunts in the film. Because of the similarity of their riding styles, her younger sister Autumn performed the pre-crash stunts. She also made a brief appearance as herself in the 3rd season of Yellowstone.
