= Slump (sports) =

Underperformance in sports

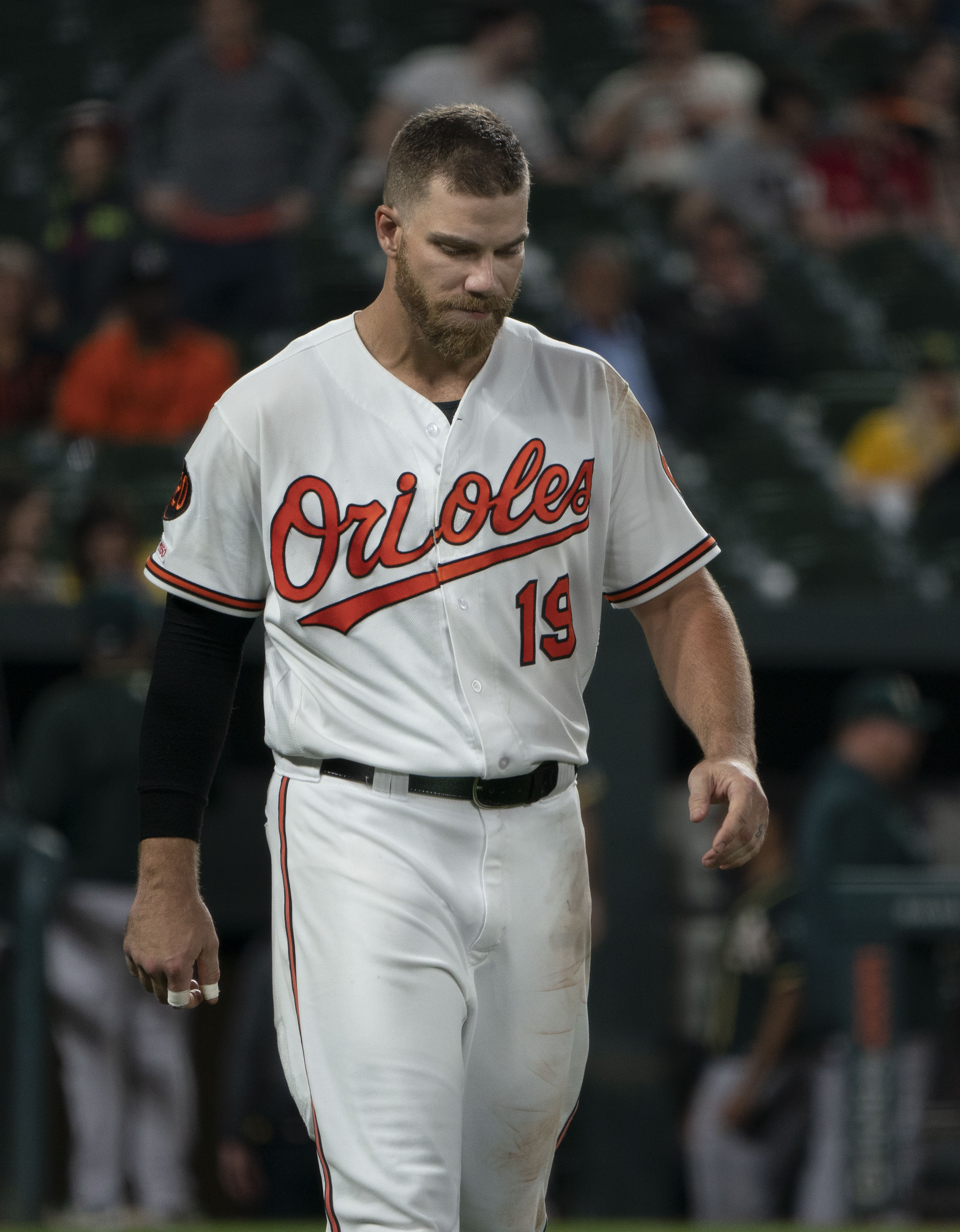
Chris Davis of the Baltimore Orioles pictured during his MLB record 54 at bats without a hit.

In the realm of sports, a slump is an extended period of poor performance exhibited by a player or team, often characterized by a lack of production compared to their usual standards. Slumps exist in various sports and at all different levels of competition. They are typically characterized by a losing streak, or reduced consistency, though the term is often misused when referring to the natural decline in a player's production at the end of their career. The causes of slumps can vary greatly, though they are generally brought on by physical factors like fatigue and injury, or psychological factors like burnout, pressure, and loss of confidence. Slumps can affect athletes of any skill level, and even some of the greatest athletes of all time have gone through periods of prolonged slumps. Overcoming a slump can often require a combination of technical and psychological adjustments as well as an increase in the athlete's mental fortitude. While slumps can frustrate players and fans, especially if they last more than a few games, they are a natural aspect of any athlete's career.

== Psychological causes ==
Research has provided evidence that one of the main reasons athletes fall into slumps are due to psychological stressors that inhibit their performance. Performance anxiety, for example, which causes an athlete to become too focused on outcomes, can ultimately lead to increased pressure. This heightened level of stress can cause an athlete to perform below their standard for a prolonged period of time.

Additionally, an athlete unable to perform under pressure might end up suffering from confidence issues, which has been found to cause decreased athletic performance. Other examples of these psychological stressors include unrealistic expectations by others, and family or social problems, among other things, all of which can lead to the development of a slump.

== Physical causes ==
Physical causes of slumps are generally tied to injuries or mechanical issues, both of which can inhibit performance if left untreated.

An injured athlete may be unable to perform the tasks and movements that are required in their sport, and suffer a dip in performance as a result. For example, a soccer player with an injured ankle may be unable to shoot and pass properly, which would lead to a decrease in their output as a player.

The onset of a slump can also be caused by small technical changes (whether done consciously or sub-consciously) in an athlete's technique. Even a minuscule change can often be enough to disturb the precise combination of physical movements and timing that are required for proper technique. As a result, the complex system of movements that constitute an athlete's technique can be thrown out of sync, ultimately leading to decreased performance.

== Avoiding slumps ==
Slumps, though a normal part of any career, can be minimized with a combination of strategic physical and mental measures to ensure consistent performance.

- Balanced training schedule: Overtraining can lead to burnout and ultimately, to decreased performance. Balancing training with proper recovery can help prevent dips in performance.
- Building mental resilience: Lack of confidence plays a key role in the development of slumps. Developing mental resilience can help an athlete maintain confidence and avoid decreased performance as a result. Most professional teams make use of sports psychologists to help their players with the mental side of the game, and help them avoid the psychological causes of slumps.
- Injury avoidance: Being less susceptible to injury allows an athlete to avoid the associated decreases in performance.

== Famous slumps ==
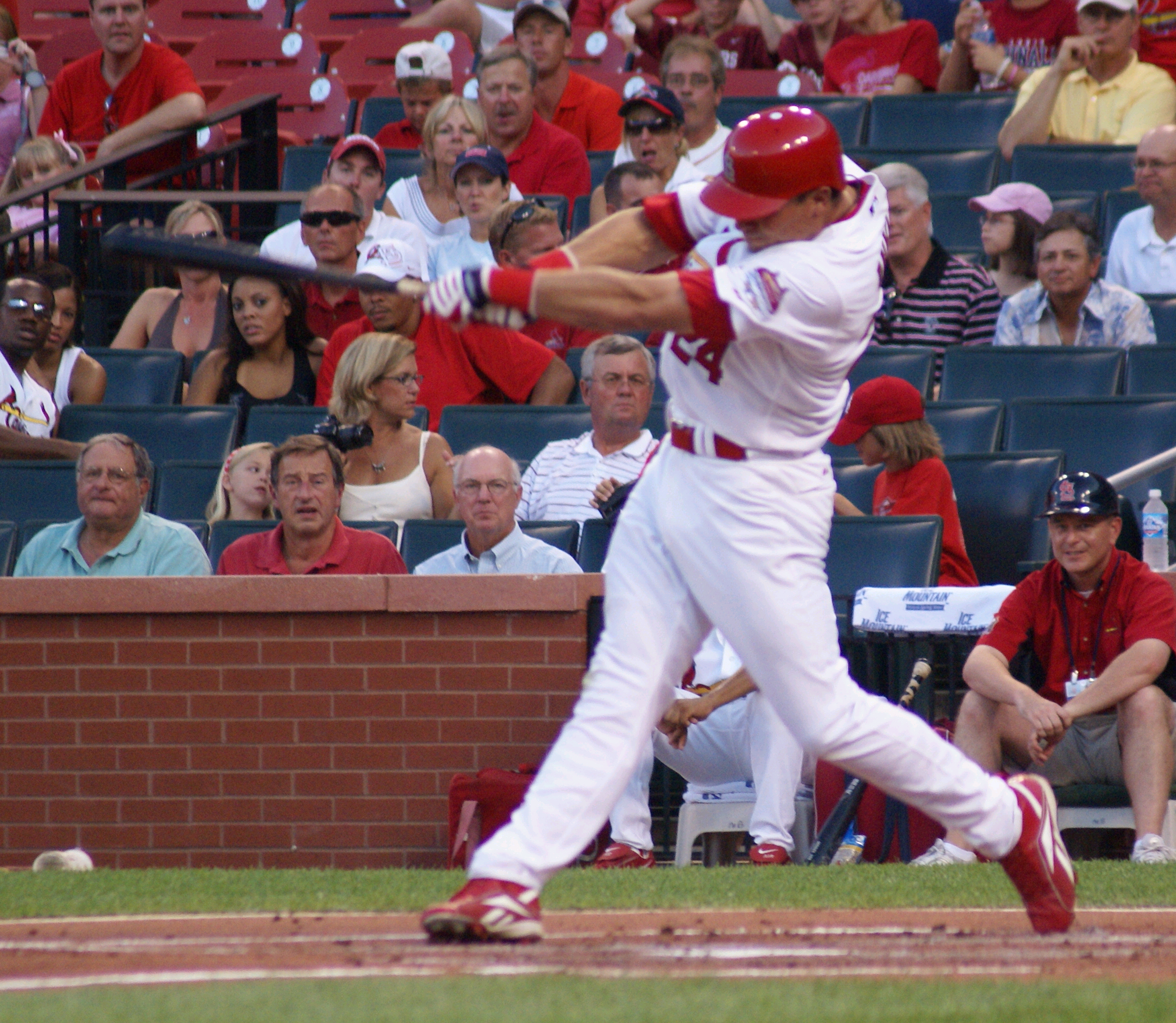
- Rick Ankiel batting for the St. Louis Cardinals after his return to the Major Leagues in 2007.
  Rick Ankiel: Ankiel, a successful pitcher for the St. Louis Cardinals inexplicably found himself unable to throw strikes during his 2001 season. His control problem eventually got so bad that he ended up leaving baseball altogether in 2005. Ankiel eventually made his way back to the major leagues as an outfielder in 2007 where he played until his second and final retirement in 2013.
- Tiger Woods: Tiger Woods, once the world's top ranked golfer, went 11 years without winning a major championship. Woods' slump can be attributed to a range of personal and physical issues that he experienced over the course of his career. His dry streak was ended in 2019 with his win of the 2019 Masters.
- Markelle Fultz: After being selected as the number one overall pick in the 2017 National Basketball Association (NBA) draft, Fultz suffered from a mysterious shoulder injury that inhibited his ability to shoot for his entire rookie season. Fultz was ultimately traded, and spent years working to recover his game.
- Serena Williams: Williams, the former number one ranked female tennis player, was hit with a lack of success from 2005 to 2007. Williams had suffered from personal issues and injuries, which culminated with her dropping to no. 140 in the world tennis rankings. Serena eventually returned to her high level of play, beating the world no.1 Maria Sharapova in the 2007 Australian Open Final, and went on to take home her third U.S. Open title in 2008.
