= Monster House (video game) =

2006 video game

- PAL region cover art for the PlayStation 2
- Developer: Artificial Mind and Movement
- Publisher: THQ
- Platforms: PlayStation 2 GameCube; Game Boy Advance; Nintendo DS
- Release: NA: July 18, 2006; EU: August 4, 2006; AU: September 7, 2006
- Genres: Third-person shooter, survival horror
- Mode: Single-player

Monster House are three distinct survival horror video games developed by Artificial Mind and Movement and published by THQ. The games are based on the 2006 animated film of the same name. The games were met with mixed reception.

== Gameplay ==
The game picks up from the part of the film where D.J., Chowder, and Jenny escape from a police car, only to be eaten by the house. The three are separated and, while looking for each other, are attacked by enemies constructed from the building's interior architecture.

The enemies throughout the game are living furniture that will try to attack the kids. Obstacles include pipes that can block doors or pathways to keep the player on track, tentacle-like pipes that can harm the player, trees that can try to grab the player, objects that can fly at the player, spotlights from windows that can awaken monsters to attack the player if they're caught, and giant pipe monsters that can suck up the player. The game has about nine chapters, each telling the story from a character's perspective. Bathrooms serve as save points throughout the game and are the safest parts of the house. Players are equipped with a default water pistol with a built-in flashlight. Each character also has a special ability that they can use to combat monsters: D.J. can stun enemies with his camera, Jenny can attack enemies and destroy padlocks with her slingshot, and Chowder can attack enemies with water balloons. Boxes containing ammo for the secondary attacks can also be used for a refill. Additionally, food found around the house can restore health, and tokens allow the player to play the game "Thou Art Dead".

== Plot ==
=== PlayStation 2 and GameCube ===
DJ, Chowder, and Jenny are pulled into the house in the police car. After that, they jump to avoid being eaten by the house, while the police car is thrown down into the stomach.

Chowder and Jenny are pulled away from DJ shortly after by two giant pipes. DJ finds a key in a chest beneath the stairs and uses it to unlock the kitchen door. He sees a burning toaster and quickly puts out the fire. After stepping into the house's spotlight, he fights a chair and enters a hallway where he sees some chairs go into a nearby room. After finding a key to the bathroom at the end of the hallway, he fights floor crawlers along the way, and a TV passes from behind him after he walks through a door. He dodges some incoming flying books and goes through the bathroom that leads him back to the foyer, where he fights another chair.

Jenny finds herself in the attic and, after jumping across a stack of crates that swiftly move away, she tries to get back by going through the air vents, but she gets trapped by a blockade of pipes.

Chowder finds himself in the greenhouse, and after exiting the greenhouse and finding a spare light bulb for his water gun, he fights chairs and wall lamps before arriving in the kitchen. After defeating numerous floor crawlers, he is attacked by a giant pipe, and he narrowly escapes the pipe by falling down a dumbwaiter shaft.

DJ enters the family room, where the phonograph begins playing music and awakens flying books. He manages to fight them off until the phonograph stops playing, unblocking a door to a hallway that leads him to a room with a player piano in it. The piano suddenly begins to play by itself, awakening two living chairs: one normal and one red, kept alive by the piano's music. DJ disables the piano, removing the red chair's invincibility and allowing DJ to finish it off. He retrieves a key inside the piano and makes it back to the family room, where he uses the key to unlock the door to the library. DJ then searches for a dusty book, uses it to open a secret passageway, and enters an air duct that leads him to the basement, where he finds a crashed police car. He contacts Skull, and he tells DJ that in order to get out, they have to kill the house by taking out its heart, which is the furnace.

DJ goes into the next room and tries to open a door, causing the knob to fall off and land on the ceiling. He turns on two washing machines to knock a large crate down from a shelf, and while he moves it over to a wardrobe to climb up it to reach the doorknob, chairs and gas tank monsters attack him. He fights them off and retrieves the doorknob. DJ then comes across a door with an unseen fiery field behind it. He finds a key inside a jar and uses it to unlock a crest, and finds a hook inside it. He enters a large room where a blockade of pipes prevents him from going any farther. After moving a crate to an open area of the blockade to block off a section of pipes, he gets inside the blocked area and moves another crate under a ladder, uses the hook to bring down the ladder, and uses it to get to the second floor.

DJ finds himself back in the second-floor foyer and tries to open an unblocked door that leads to a bedroom, which suddenly throws him inside and closes. He finds a key in a jar and uses it to unlock a nearby door to a sideways bedroom, where he finds the missing grate handle to the fireplace. He opens the fireplace and puts out the fire, revealing a secret passage that takes him to the attic. While avoiding the house's spotlight, he moves the same pile of crates that Jenny jumped across earlier back to the middle, uncovering an air duct. He moves another large crate under the vent to reach it. He goes through the vent, which leads to a hallway where he finds a key in a nearby room, uses it to open the door to another room at the end of the hallway, and finds Jenny still stuck in the vents. The room where he finds her turns 180° as DJ moves forward. After defeating numerous monsters, he goes over to Jenny but can't free her.

Jenny finds another way and enters the master bedroom. After hearing a telephone suddenly ring, it stops when she approaches. While looking at some pictures, a floor crawler comes by, getting her attention as a TV comes to life. Jenny defeats the TV and encounters the first boss in the next room: a large mannequin resembling Constance, Nebbercracker's late wife, which comes to life when the chandelier above falls on it. After defeating it, she finds a way back to the attic.

Jenny finds what appears to be a painting of her in the attic, and a lamp suddenly comes to life. She defeats the lamp and finds a key in the next room. There, she fights a stove and uses the key to unlock the door. A pipe blockade appears, and she sees DJ on the floor below. DJ comes after her, but is eaten by a canopy bed in the master bedroom after defeating many monsters and finding a key on the bed. Up in the attic, Jenny finds a train set powered by a bicycle. Monsters ambush her as she moves the model train, which eventually derails and disappears into a poster; she finds a small tunnel behind it that leads into another room. After defeating two stoves and three lamps, she recovers the missing gear from the dumbwaiter and uses it to get to the basement.

Chowder awakens in the bowels of the house after falling down the dumbwaiter, fights a TV, and enters a flooded room. He climbs up to a platform, moves a crate to a nearby pipe with a valve, and turns the valve to drain the water. Chowder then fights off many monsters consisting of gas tanks, floor crawlers, and lamps, and encounters the second boss, a large killer pipe. After defeating them all, he moves another crate to a high-up platform and finds a key to the nearby door behind some furnaces. After using it to unlock the door, he enters an underground bathroom, where a TV passes behind him as he goes through a door. Making his way through the labyrinth, Chowder fights two more TVs and encounters the third boss, again the giant pipe, but has to defeat it thrice before he can make his way to the actual basement.

Jenny makes her way to the basement, where she fights two TVs and another stove before reuniting with DJ. Meanwhile, Chowder must make his way through a maze of toys in another part of the basement.

Chowder finds his lost basketball at the end of the maze, but also finds and defeats the fourth boss, this time, two large pipes instead of one. Chowder enters a circus-themed area where he plays shooting games to find the missing eye and nose of the clown on a merry-go-around to move forward, all while fighting off chairs, floor crawlers, gas tanks, and a TV (which will only come alive if Chowder fails at one of the games) before reuniting with DJ and Jenny.

The trio discovers that the house is possessed by Constance after finding her corpse and learning of her backstory. They try to destroy the furnace (the heart), but fail and are separated again by three giant pipes.

The trio then fights to escape the house, making their way through the maze of corridors and encountering more enemies. They all reunite at the main entrance and narrowly escape the house thanks to Jenny, who pulls down the house's uvula (foyer chandelier).

After escaping, the house chases them to an abandoned construction site. Along the way, the house causes a manhole to pop up and throws a car at them. Chowder fights off the house, the final boss, with a backhoe.

Then, DJ, while hanging from a construction crane, throws an active dynamite down the house's chimney, destroying the furnace and the house itself. DJ then says one last monologue, then the game's credits roll.

=== Game Boy Advance ===
DJ, Jenny, and Chowder prepare to destroy the house, but it pulls them inside with its tongue. They lose most of their equipment after being trapped inside the house. Skull provides them with outside help through their walkie-talkies and tells them to find blueprints to help navigate the house and take shelter in the bathrooms, which are the safest parts of the house, as it will refuse to cause any damage to the bathrooms because the water will flood them. He also tells them to destroy the heart (the furnace) to kill the house. As they recover their equipment, they encounter chairs, giant bugs, TVs, lamps, and floorboards. While trying to find a way into the basement, Chowder is captured and taken to the attic. DJ and Jenny find a slingshot that helps them reach the attic. After they rescue Chowder from the chairs, Skull tells them to find the elevator to reach the basement, but a gear is missing. After finding it, they encounter a mannequin resembling Constance that comes to life and attacks them. They defeat it and use the elevator to get to the basement, but the door to the furnace requires a heart-shaped emblem to open.

During their search, they encounter bookshelves, candles, trees, and a carpet monster (the tongue). They find the first piece of the heart emblem and locate a fuse for the water pump that drains water from the third floor into the basement. After fighting the Constance mannequin a second time, they find the second piece of the heart emblem. The trio eventually discovers Constance's corpse and learns the truth about her through a diary that they have found. The Constance mannequin appears again. After they defeat it one last time, they find the last piece of the heart emblem and use it to open the door to the furnace, but Skull warns them to get a stronger weapon first. Having known that Nebbercracker used to be in the military, he advises them to get some dynamite. They come across Nebbercracker, who, after they explain their discoveries, shares his backstory and is convinced to let Constance go, but this angers the house. While Nebbercracker tries to stall it, the kids find the dynamite and battle the furnace. After it is destroyed, the house is on the verge of falling apart. They meet up with Nebbercracker at the front door, but it is locked. They shoot the uvula to force the house to let them out. After escaping, the house is destroyed. A dialogue reveals that Constance is now at rest, Nebbercracker is at last free of his torment, and he and the kids help return the toys that he took from the other kids.

=== DS ===
After being eaten by the house, DJ, Jenny, and Chowder seek a way out and a way to destroy it. They battle a variety of living furniture along the way and also rescue Landers, Lister, Bones, and a dog, who were also eaten by the house. The kids also find toys that the house has also eaten, including Bones' kite, Jenny's candy-filled wagon, and Chowder's basketball. Eventually, they manage to destroy the furnace, but this is not enough to defeat the house. They escape and fight the house from the outside, eventually killing it and ending its reign of terror.

== Development and release ==
On November 28, 2005, video game publisher THQ announced it had signed a deal with Sony Pictures Consumer Products to produce a video game based on Robert Zemeckis and Steven Spielberg's upcoming Halloween-themed film project Monster House. At this point, the animated film's July 21, 2006, theatrical date and premise of three kids who encounter a house that eats trick-or-treaters every Halloween had been announced. Although consoles and release dates were not specified in THQ's announcement, the publisher revealed that players would act as the three lead protagonists exploring the house, and that originally conceived situations would be included.

On May 4, 2006, THQ announced its line-up for the year's (E3), the publisher's largest yet, which featured Monster House. The line-up spanned a variety of platforms and included both original and licensed products. Explained THQ CEO and president Brian Farrell, the company's mission at this point was to "capitalize on industry growth opportunities over the next several years", and having "an impressive product pipeline of high-profile original and licensed properties" every year would "keep THQ on the cutting edge of innovative development for all viable platforms". On the list, platforms for Monster House were revealed to be the GameCube, Nintendo DS, PlayStation 2 and Game Boy Advance.

On April 27, 2006, IGN published a Craig Harris-written "hands-off" piece on the Game Boy Advance version a week before the E3 event. It claimed the version was developed by the Montreal-based Artificial Mind and Movement, whose portfolio for the handheld console were side-scrolling platformers such as a 2005 adaptation of Teen Titans (2003–2006) and multiple games based on Kim Possible (2002–2007). With a new engine, the Canadian development team's goal was a combination of the adventurous feel of The Legend of Zelda (1986–present) and the hardcore action of Zombies Ate My Neighbors (1993).

At the E3 event, an art piece of THQ's Monster House was one of 16 presented at the Into the Pixel exhibit, voted on by members of E3, the Academy of Interactive Arts & Sciences, and the Prints & Drawings Council of the Los Angeles County Museum of Art.

== Reception ==
Reception

Aggregate score
Aggregator	Score			
Aggregator	DS	GBA	GameCube	PS2
Metacritic	62/100	69/100	60/100	59/100

Review scores
Publication	Score			
Publication	DS	GBA	GameCube	PS2
Eurogamer	N/A	N/A	N/A	5/10
Famitsu	21/40	N/A	N/A	N/A
Game Informer	6/10	N/A	N/A	N/A
GamePro	3.5/5	N/A	N/A	N/A
GameSpot	7.3/10	8.2/10	4.7/10	4.7/10
GameSpy	3.5/5	4/5	2/5	2/5
GameZone	6.9/10	7.5/10	8/10	6.7/10
IGN	5.5/10	7/10	6.8/10	6.8/10
Nintendo Life	7/10	N/A	N/A	N/A
Nintendo Power	5.5/10	5/10	6.5/10	N/A
Official U.S. PlayStation Magazine	N/A	N/A	N/A	7/10
Pocket Gamer	3.5/5	N/A	N/A	N/A
Entertainment Weekly	N/A	N/A	N/A	B
The Sydney Morning Herald	N/A	N/A	2.5/5	2.5/5

Monster House received "mixed or average reviews" on all platforms according to the review aggregation website Metacritic. In Japan, where the DS version was ported for release on February 1, 2007, Famitsu gave it a score of one four, one five, and two sixes for a total of 21 out of 40. At the Annie Awards in 2007, Monster House was nominated for Best Animated Video Game.
