= Monster House (film) =

2006 film by Gil Kenan

- Theatrical release poster
- Directed by: Gil Kenan
- Screenplay by: Dan Harmon; Rob Schrab; Pamela Pettler
- Story by: Dan Harmon; Rob Schrab
- Produced by: Steve Starkey; Jack Rapke
- Starring: Steve Buscemi; Nick Cannon; Maggie Gyllenhaal; Jon Heder; Kevin James; Jason Lee; Sam Lerner; Spencer Locke; Mitchel Musso; Catherine O'Hara; Kathleen Turner; Fred Willard
- Cinematography: Xavier Pérez Grobet
- Edited by: Adam P. Scott; Fabienne Rawley
- Music by: Douglas Pipes
- Production company: Columbia Pictures; Relativity Media; ImageMovers; Amblin Entertainment
- Distributed by: Sony Pictures Releasing
- Release dates: June 15, 2006 (Seattle International Film Festival); July 21, 2006 (United States)
- Running time: 91 minutes
- Country: United States
- Language: English
- Budget: $75 million
- Box office: $141.9 million

Monster House is a 2006 American animated comedy horror film directed by Gil Kenan in his feature directorial debut, from a screenplay by Dan Harmon, Rob Schrab, and Pamela Pettler. The film stars the voices of Steve Buscemi, Nick Cannon, Maggie Gyllenhaal, Jon Heder, Kevin James, Jason Lee, Sam Lerner, Spencer Locke, Mitchel Musso, Catherine O'Hara, Kathleen Turner, and Fred Willard. The plot revolves around a suburban neighborhood being terrorized by a sentient haunted house during Halloween.

The film was produced by Steve Starkey and Jack Rapke, with Robert Zemeckis, Steven Spielberg, and Jason Clark serving as executive producers. The human characters were animated using motion-capture animation, which was previously utilized in Zemeckis' previous film, The Polar Express (2004). Monster House was also Sony's first computer-animated film produced by Sony Pictures Imageworks and Relativity Media's first animated film.

Monster House premiered at the Seattle International Film Festival on June 15, 2006, and was released in the United States on July 21, 2006, by Sony Pictures Releasing under their Columbia Pictures label. The film received generally positive reviews from critics and grossed $141.9 million worldwide against its $75 million budget. It received nominations for the Academy Award for Best Animated Feature and the Golden Globe Award for Best Animated Feature Film, but lost to Happy Feet and Cars, respectively.

== Plot ==
On the day before Halloween, young D.J. Walters spies on his elderly neighbor, Horace Nebbercracker, who is known for frightening children off his property and confiscating their belongings. D.J.'s parents leave town for a convention, placing him in the care of his teenage babysitter, Zee. Later, D.J.'s best friend Charles "Chowder" Peterson loses his basketball on Nebbercracker's front yard, and D.J. attempts to retrieve it. Nebbercracker confronts D.J., but suffers a heart attack and is taken away by paramedics, leading the boys to believe he has died.

When Zee's boyfriend Bones visits, he recalls Nebbercracker's theft of his kite and relates rumors of him cannibalizing his late wife. After Zee kicks him out, Bones sees his kite in the front door of Nebbercracker's house and tries to reclaim it, only to be sucked inside. D.J. and Chowder later investigate and discover that the house is possessed by a poltergeist, which they assume is Nebbercracker's vengeful spirit.

The next morning, the boys save a girl named Jenny Bennett from the house as she sells candy for her school. Jenny calls police officers Landers and Lister, but the house lies dormant when they arrive and they dismiss their report. The children consult local supernatural expert Reginald "Skull" Skulinski, who speculates that the house can only be vanquished when its heart is struck. Deducing that its furnace is the heart, the children construct a dummy filled with cold medicine and offer it to the house in order to put it to sleep. However, Landers and Lister foil their plan and the house devours them all. The children explore the now-asleep house and discover a shrine to Nebbercracker's wife, Constance, whose skeletal remains are entombed in cement. The house awakens, but Jenny grabs its chandelier-based uvula and causes the house to vomit them back outside.

Nebbercracker returns from the hospital and reveals that Constance is the house. He explains that they married after he rescued her from a life of exploitation in a freak show. One Halloween, children began harassing Constance, causing her to fall into the house's unfinished basement, where she was suffocated by cement from a concrete mixer. Upon the house's completion, Constance's spirit merged with it, forcing Nebbercracker to feign hatred towards children to protect them from her wrath.

D.J. insists that Nebbercracker put Constance to rest. Overhearing this, Constance uses a pair of trees to lift the house from its foundation and chase the group. They lure Constance to a nearby construction site, where Chowder combats her with an excavator as D.J. uses dynamite against the house to destroy it. Constance's spirit shares a moment with Nebbercracker before ascending to the afterlife. Nebbercracker returns all of the stolen toys to their rightful owners, and D.J. and Chowder go trick-or-treating, which the former previously thought they had outgrown. During the credits, all of the house's victims emerge from the basement.

== Cast ==
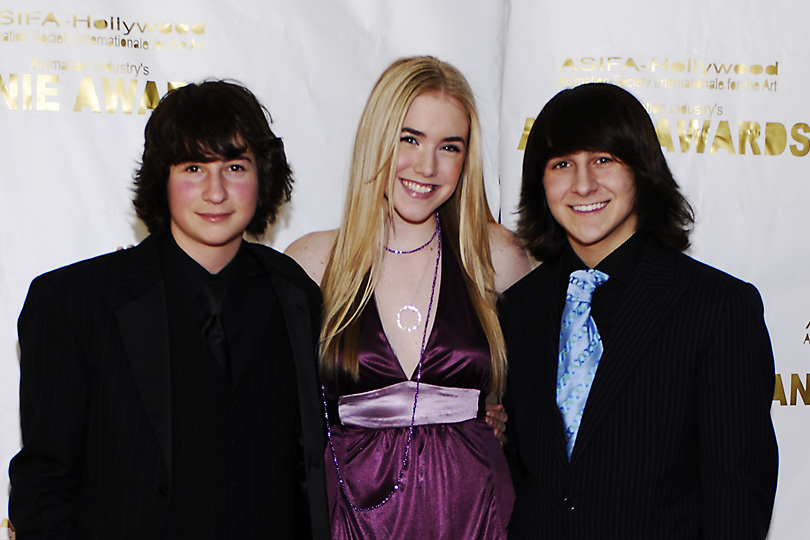
Lead voice cast Sam Lerner, Spencer Locke and Mitchel Musso at the 2006 Annie Awards

- Mitchel Musso as Dustin James "D.J." Walters, a twelve-year-old boy who investigates the Nebbercracker house.
- Sam Lerner as Charles "Chowder" Peterson, D.J.'s best friend.
- Spencer Locke as Jenny Bennett, a girl who befriends D.J. and Chowder.
- Steve Buscemi as Horace Nebbercracker, D.J.'s elderly neighbor.
- Maggie Gyllenhaal as Elizabeth, D.J.'s teenage babysitter who is better known by her nickname, Zee.
- Kevin James as Officer Landers, a local police officer.
- Nick Cannon as Officer Lister, Landers' partner.
- Jon Heder as Reginald "Skull" Skulinski, a pizza delivery man, gamer and friend of D.J. and Chowder who is an expert on the supernatural. He later begins a relationship with Zee in the film's epilogue.
- Jason Lee as Bones, Zee's rude ex-boyfriend.
- Kathleen Turner as Constance "The Giantess" Nebbercracker, Nebbercracker's late wife whose vengeful spirit is possessing their house.
- Fred Willard as D.J.'s unnamed father
- Catherine O'Hara as D.J.'s unnamed mother
- Ryan Whitney as Elizabeth, a young girl who has her tricycle confiscated by Nebbercracker at the start of the film.

== Production ==
Monster House was initially set up at DreamWorks Animation, based on a pitch by newcomer Gil Kenan. Having just finished film school recently, Kenan had been having meetings with film producers for a while, but had not found any success, with a screenplay based on the Pac-Man video game series going unproduced. After Kenan received Dan Harmon's and Rob Schrab's screenplay for ImageMovers, Kenan had a meeting with head of story Bennett Schneir, where he was able to pitch his vision for the film. Schneir worked for Robert Zemeckis as the head of development at ImageMovers, and Kenan had a meeting with Zemeckis quickly thereafter, apparently due to the filmmakers wanting to get a director for the project as fast as they could. Upon impressing Zemeckis with his pitch, Kenan then had a meeting with DreamWorks co-founder Steven Spielberg, where he pitched the film to Spielberg in a presentation with some sketches and drawings he had drawn before meeting Zemeckis. By 2004, the studio put the film in turnaround, after which Sony Pictures picked up the project and began production on August 23 of that year, with Zemeckis and Spielberg serving as executive producers.

The original screenplay of Monster House was, in Kenan's words, "absolutely brilliant and laugh-out-loud funny". Due to his experience as a storyteller, Kenan decided to preserve all the characters and the tone from Harmon's and Schrab's story, but added the idea that the titular house was possessed by a soul, leading to the creation of Constance Nebbercracker and the house's backstory. To help him revise the script and introduce Constance and Horace Nebbercracker into the plot, Kenan brought Pamela Pettler after reading her script for Corpse Bride (2005). They worked on the script at her house, and to meet the established deadline, they finished a draft quickly and sent it to Amy Pascal at Sony's Columbia Pictures. As work on the screenplay was underway, in a few months of preparation, Kenan had assembled a team of storyboard artists led by Simeon Wilkins in Studio City, Los Angeles to put up rudimentary boards with scratch dialogue and temporal score, with Khang Lee and Chris Appelhans collaborating on paintings for the film.

The film was shot using motion-capture, in which the actors performed the characters' movement and lines while linked to sensors, a process pioneered by Zemeckis for his 2004 film The Polar Express (2004). Zemeckis was in the process of starting filming on The Polar Express when he met Kenan, who visited the set to see how that film was filmed and discussed with Kenan how they would exactly shoot Monster House, deciding that they should prioritize the story before the filming technology, though Kenan always felt that the story should use animation to create a world with a living house, as he opined that making the house a viable threat and character would better work in an animated setting.

The casting for Monster House was a laborious process, especially for the lead trio, who were portrayed by Mitchel Musso, Sam Lerner and Spencer Locke. Kenan agreed with head of animation Troy Saliba that actors were needed to portray the roles in a believable way. Many of the film's artists interpreted the roles on set and enhanced the lead actors through posed animation that drove the exaggerations of their performances to make them feel subtle and real.

Ed Verreaux served as the production designer of Monster House. To design the neighbourhood where the story takes place, Verreaux realized that the film's setting needed to resemble that of 1980s films, like E.T. the Extra-Terrestrial (1982). During his discussions with Harmon and Schrab, Kenan was told that the film's setting was inspired by that of Wisconsin and Minneapolis. Verreaux and Kenan went together on a scouting trip to design the film's locations, which involved a visit to Universal Studios' backlot, during which they were granted access to the suburban street of The 'Burbs (1989), the neighborhood of the TV series Desperate Housewives (2004-2012), and the house of Psycho (1960).

Monster House was the first animated feature film using the Arnold rendering software (co-developed at Sony Pictures Imageworks), and the first feature film entirely rendered with unbiased, brute-force path tracing.

== Digital 3D version ==
As with The Polar Express, a stereoscopic 3D version of the film was created and had a limited special release in digital 3D stereo along with the "flat" version. While The Polar Express was produced for the 3D IMAX 70mm giant film format, Monster House was released in approximately 200 theaters equipped for new REAL D Cinema digital 3D stereoscopic projection. The process was not based on film, but was purely digital. Since the original source material was "built" in virtual 3D, it created a very rich stereoscopic environment. For the film's release, the studio nicknamed it Imageworks 3D.

== Release ==
The film was released in theaters in North America on July 21, 2006.

== Reception and legacy ==
Dear Salinger,
Your mom told me about Monster House scaring you. It sounds like one of the things that upset you is the fact that the house kept wanting to hurt people even after nobody wanted to hurt it anymore. I will tell you a secret that sounds so silly, you might not believe it, but this is true: I never finished writing Monster House before my bosses turned it into a movie. And then different writers, people I don't even know, changed the story in lots of ways, and the movie that you saw was not the story I wanted to tell you. I think a good story, even if it is sad or scary while you're watching it, should always make you a little less scared after you've seen it. And that didn't happen in Monster House. Why, after they escaped the house, did that old man tell them another scary story about a mean fat lady that didn't make very much sense either? I'll tell you why. Because Gil Kenan is a hack and Steven Spielberg is a moron. But hey, I shouldn't be dumping this stuff on you. I hope one day I can finish writing a movie that they don't change so much, and if you see it, I hope it makes you happy. Until then, I heard that Wall-E is very good, you should go see that. And next time Monster House is on, just remember that the guy that wrote it told you it was dumb.

— Monster House screenwriter Dan Harmon in a letter to a 7-year-old fan who reportedly had nightmares after watching the film, as quoted by Dave Itzkoff of The New York Times (March 29, 2010)

Review aggregation site Rotten Tomatoes gives the film a 75% approval rating, based on 161 reviews with an average rating of 7.1/10. The site's critical consensus reads, "Monster House welcomes kids and adults alike into a household full of smart, monstrous fun." On Metacritic the film has a score of 68 out of 100 based on 32 critics, indicating "generally favorable" reviews. Audiences polled by CinemaScore gave the film an average grade of "B" on an A+ to F scale.

Roger Ebert gave the film his highest ranking of four stars calling it "one of the most original and exciting animated movies I've seen in a long time" and compared it to the works of Tim Burton. Ian Freer of Empire gave the film 4 out of 5 stars, stating "A kind of Goonies for the Noughties, Monster House is a visually dazzling thrill ride that scales greater heights through its winning characters and poignantly etched emotions. A scary, sharp, funny movie, this is the best kids' flick of the year so far." Jane Boursaw of Common Sense Media also gave it 4 stars out of 5, saying "This is one of those movies where all the planets align: a top-notch crew (director Gil Kenan; executive producers Steven Spielberg and Robert Zemeckis), memorable voices that fit the characters perfectly; and a great story, ingenious backstory, and twisty-turny ending." Roger Moore of the Orlando Sentinel also gave the film four stars out of five, saying "This Monster House is a real fun house. It's a 3-D animated kids' film built on classic gothic horror lines, a jokey, spooky Goonies for the new millennium." Scott Bowles of USA Today gave the film a positive review, saying that "The movie treats children with respect. Monster's pre-teens are sarcastic, think they're smarter than their parents and are going crazy over the opposite sex". Amy Biancolli of the Houston Chronicle wrote, "It's engineered to scare your pants off, split your sides and squeeze your tear ducts into submission." Michael Medved called it "ingenious" and "slick, clever [and] funny" while also cautioning parents about letting small children see it due to its scary and intense nature, adding that a "PG-13 rating would have been more appropriate than its PG rating." A. O. Scott of The New York Times commented, "One of the spooky archetypes of childhood imagination—the dark, mysterious house across the street—is literally brought to life in "Monster House", a marvelously creepy animated feature directed by Gil Kenan."

The film received criticism for inconsistent logic and unoriginal characters. Frank Lovece of Film Journal International praised director Gil Kenan as "a talent to watch" but criticized the "internal logic [that] keeps changing... D.J.'s parents are away, and the house doesn't turn monstrous in front of his teenage babysitter, Zee. But it does turn monstrous in front of her boyfriend, Bones. It doesn't turn monstrous in front of the town's two cops until, in another scene, it does." In a mixed review, Todd McCarthy of Variety wrote: "Alert 'Harry Potter' fans will notice the script shamelessly lifts the prime personality traits of J. K. Rowling's three most important young characters for its lead trio... it is a theme-park ride, with shocks and jolts provided with reliable regularity. Across 90 minutes, however, the experience is desensitizing and dispiriting and far too insistent."

In 2010, Canadian author Kelly Oxford wrote on her Tumblr blog that her 7-year-old daughter Salinger had nightmares after watching the film. She stated that she half-jokingly wrote to screenwriter Dan Harmon: "It's been 3 nights of her waking up crying and I totally blame you. You should come over and rationalize the entire thing to her. Okay, maybe you could just write her a note because she doesn't believe I know the creator of her nightmares." Harmon personally responded with a letter to the young fan expressing his dissatisfaction with the decision to add the Constance backstory to the film's plot, and criticizing Kenan and Spielberg, calling them a "hack" and a "moron", respectively (although he later clarified he was just venting, and did not really mean the latter). The staff of Cracked.com included the letter in the site's list of "4 Strange, Revealing Fanmail Replies From Famous People", where they wrote: "That's... actually a very concise and kid-friendly explanation of how modern Hollywood works. Bravo, Dan Harmon!"

=== Box office ===
Monster House opened theatrically on July 21, 2006, alongside Clerks II, Lady in the Water and My Super Ex-Girlfriend, and grossed $22.2 million in its opening weekend, ranking number two at the North American box office behind Pirates of the Caribbean: Dead Man's Chest. The film ended its theatrical run on October 22, 2006, having grossed $73.7 million in North America and $68.2 million overseas for a worldwide total of $141.9 million against a production budget of $75 million.

=== Awards and nominations ===
Award	Category	Recipient	Result
Academy Award	Best Animated Feature	Gil Kenan	Nominated
Annie Award	Best Animated Feature	Monster House	Nominated
Annie Award	Directing in an Animated Feature Production	Gil Kenan	Nominated
Annie Award	Voice Acting in an Animated Feature Production	Maggie Gyllenhaal	Nominated
Annie Award	Voice Acting in an Animated Feature Production	Sam Lerner	Nominated
Annie Award	Voice Acting in an Animated Feature Production	Spencer Locke	Nominated
Annie Award	Writing in an Animated Feature Production	Dan Harmon, Rob Schrab and Pamela Pettler	Nominated
Golden Globe Awards	Best Animated Feature Film	Gil Kenan	Nominated
Saturn Award	Best Animated Film	Monster House	Nominated
Saturn Award	Best Young Actor/Actress	Mitchel Musso	Nominated
Saturn Award	Best Score	Douglas Pipes	Nominated
Dallas–Fort Worth Film Critics Association Awards	Best Animated Film	Gil Kenan	Nominated
Critics' Choice Awards	Best Animated Feature	Gil Kenan	Nominated
Online Film Critics Society Awards	Best Animated Film	Monster House	Nominated
Producers Guild of America Awards	Best Animated Motion Picture	Jack Rapke and Steve Starkey	Nominated
Florida Film Critics Circle Awards	Best Animated Film	Gil Kenan	Won

In 2008, the American Film Institute nominated this film for its Top 10 Animation Films list.

== Marketing ==
=== Video game ===
A video game based on the film was released by THQ on July 18, 2006, for the PlayStation 2, Nintendo GameCube, Game Boy Advance and Nintendo DS.

=== Printed media ===
A companion comic book was released on June 14, 2006, with the title Monster House. One of the stories was written by Joshua Dysart with a second story written and illustrated by Simeon Wilkins. The comic was focused on the lives of the characters of Bones and Skull. On June 23, 2006, a novelization of the film was released entitled Monster House: There Goes the Neighborhood. It was written by Tom Hughes.

== Potential sequel or spin-off ==
On March 25, 2024, while promoting Ghostbusters: Frozen Empire, director Gil Kenan addressed the possibility of a sequel or a spin-off movie.

== See also ==
- List of films set around Halloween
