= Chris Appelhans =

American filmmaker and illustrator (born 1980)

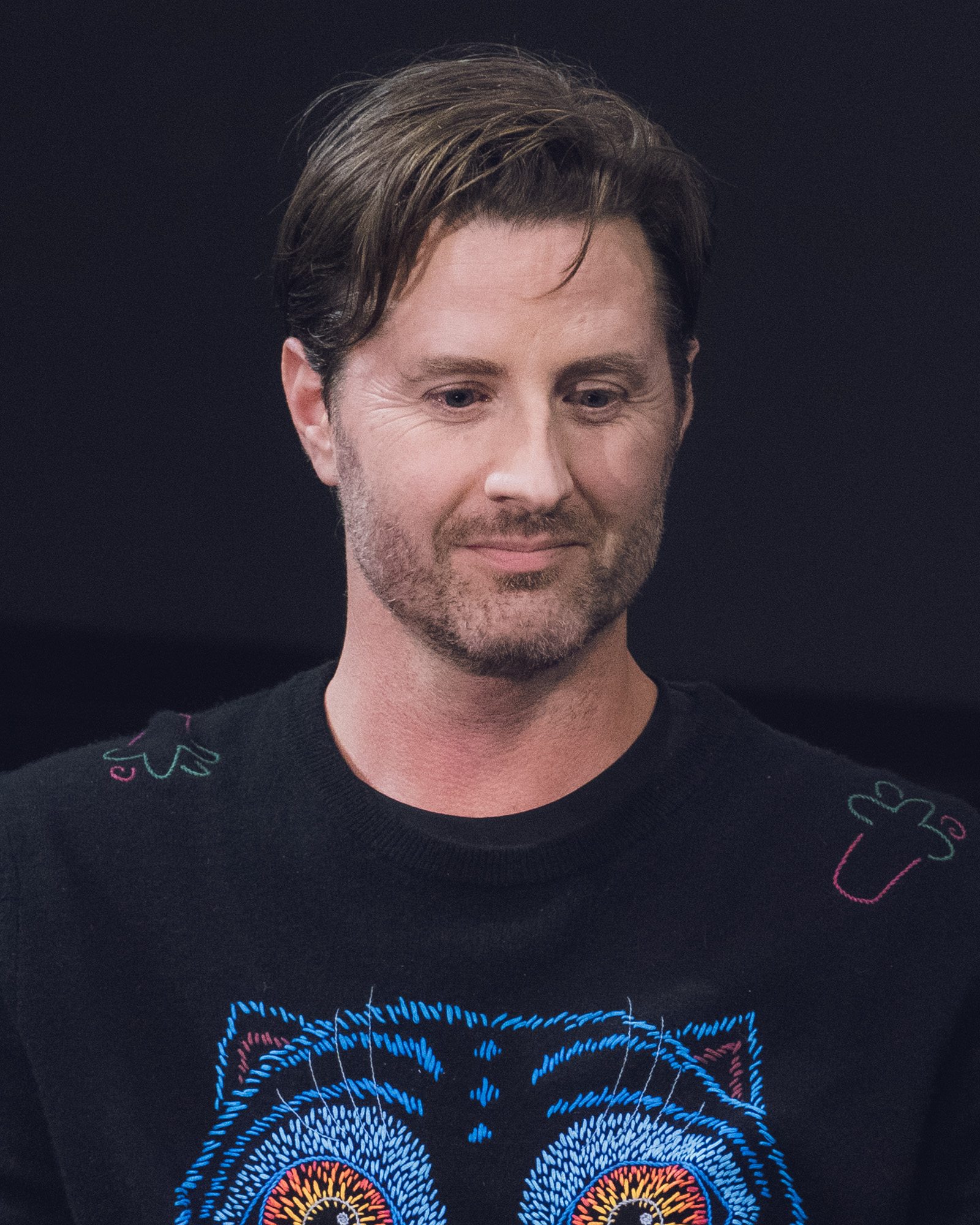
- Appelhans in 2026
- Born: Christopher Appelhans; April 28, 1980 (age 46); Firth, Idaho, U.S.
- Education: ArtCenter College of Design (BFA)
- Occupations: Film director; writer; illustrator; designer
- Years active: 2006–present
- Notable work: Wish Dragon; Kpop Demon Hunters
- Spouse: Maurene Goo (m. 2012)
- Children: 1

Christopher Appelhans (born April 28, 1980) is an American filmmaker, illustrator, and designer. He is best known as the writer and director of Wish Dragon (2021) and KPop Demon Hunters (2025), which he co-directed and wrote with Maggie Kang. The latter earned them two Annie Awards, a Golden Globe Award, and an Academy Award. He has also illustrated two children's books, A Greyhound, a Groundhog and Sparky!, the latter of which won the Children's Choice Book Award in 2015.

== Early life and education ==
Appelhans was born in Firth, Idaho, to Kristi and Anthony Appelhans. His paternal great-grandfather, Clemens Appelhans, emigrated from a German village in Russia to a homestead near Sterling, Colorado, in 1905.

At the age of four, the family moved to Idaho Falls, where Appelhans attended Taylorview Middle School and Idaho Falls High School. He grew up playing Dungeons & Dragons, and enjoyed writing and storytelling. While he also liked drawing as a part of storytelling, he was not passionate about it growing up.

In his junior year of high school, he was encouraged to pursue visual art as a career by a family friend who taught at Ricks College, which had a feeder program with the ArtCenter College of Design in Pasadena, California. After graduating from high school in 1998, Appelhans studied illustration at ArtCenter and graduated with a Bachelor of Fine Arts in 2002. By the end of his studies, Appelhans became drawn to the idea of working on children's literature and film on the grounds that children judged works on merit rather than their creator.

== Film career ==
=== Early career and directorial debut (2006–2021) ===
Appelhans began his career in film as a character designer and concept artist on Monster House (2006); he was hired after his online portfolio was discovered by Lucasfilm production designer Doug Chiang, who, despite having never met Appelhans, referred him to ImageMovers, one of the production companies working on Monster House.

According to Appelhans, he continued to work as a production designer and artist for "seven or eight years" before realizing his strength and passion was in story writing. Shortly after, he pitched a live-action film to the executives at ImageMovers, who bought the idea and, at the direction of owner Robert Zemeckis, hired Appelhans to write the screenplay. The job was Appelhans's first foray into screenwriting, which he says was a learning experience and "wasn't particularly good". By the time he had completed and submitted the screenplay, ImageMovers had ended their partnership with The Walt Disney Company and the project did not move forward. In 2012, Appelhans's concept was announced to be the basis of Disney's The Magic Catalogue, a sci-fi adventure film about a group of teens discovering a cache of high-tech weapons. The film was to be produced by Zemeckis's ImageMovers and written by Jason Fuchs. In the following years, Appelhans sold and developed another screenplay for Laika, which was also not greenlit. He described the time in the lead up to his first film as "six to eight years in the wilderness learning how to write – learning what a story was, learning how to construct a 90-minute feature and living through it."

In 2018, Appelhans was announced as the director and writer of the animated film Wish Dragon for Sony Pictures Animation, in his writing and directorial debut. The film is about a college student's encounter with a dragon who has the power to grant three wishes; it was based on his friendship with Michael Wu, a cousin of his colleague he met during a visit to China in 2014. Wish Dragon was released theatrically in China on January 15, 2021, and on Netflix internationally on June 11, 2021.

=== KPop Demon Hunters and subsequent success (2021–present) ===
Following the production of Wish Dragon, its producer Aron Warner introduced Appelhans to Maggie Kang, who had first pitched Warner the idea that eventually became KPop Demon Hunters, an animated film about a K-pop girl group that hunts demons secretly. Appelhans had also worked with Kang's husband, Radford Sechrist, on Wish Dragon. According to Kang, she and Appelhans met over lunch and "bonded immediately"; Appelhans had planned on taking a break after Wish Dragon, but changed his mind after their initial conversation. He stated that he "always wanted to do a film about the power of music—to unite, bring joy, build community". KPop Demon Hunters was officially announced in April 2021 by Sony Pictures Animation with Kang and Appelhans as co-directors and writers. Production wrapped four years later in 2025, and the film was released on Netflix on June 20, 2025. The film became Netflix's most watched animated movie of all time by July 2025, and eventually Netflix's most-watched title at 266 million views by September, overtaking the first season of Squid Game (2021).

In March 2026, Netflix and Sony Picture Animation announced that Appelhans and Kang will return to direct and write a sequel for KPop Demon Hunters, with plans for a release in 2029. Puck reported that, due to the success of the film, Kang and Appelhans successfully negotiated a five-year, $10 million per annum contract with Netflix for the sequel, which includes a share of ancillary revenue from the franchise.

== Illustration career ==
Aside from his work in film, Appelhans has also illustrated children's books. His first book was Sparky! by Jenny Offill, which won the Children's Choice Book Award in 2015. In 2017, he illustrated A Greyhound, a Groundhog, by Emily Jenkins.

== Filmography ==
Year	Title	Credited as				Notes
Year	Title	Director	Writer	Storyboard artist	Other	Notes
2006	Monster House	No	No	No	Yes	Character designer, concept artist
2008	City of Ember	No	No	No	Yes	Concept artist
2009	Coraline	No	No	No	Yes	Illustrator
2009	Fantastic Mr. Fox	No	No	No	Yes	Environment designer
2009	The Princess and the Frog	No	No	No	Yes	Visual development artist
2011	Puss in Boots	No	No	No	Yes	Visual development artist
2012	Rise of the Guardians	No	No	No	Yes	Additional story material, character designer
2016	The Angry Birds Movie	No	No	No	Yes	Additional artist
2019	Wonder Park	No	No	Yes	No	
2021	Wish Dragon	Yes	Yes	No	Yes	Film debut Voice role: Hot Towel Waiter and Nomani Retailer
2025	KPop Demon Hunters	Yes	Yes	No	No	
2027	Wish Dragon 2	No	Yes	No	No	

=== Television shows ===
Year	Title	Network	Role	Notes
2026	Welcome, First Time in Korea?	MBC every1	Guest	Travelers

== Awards and nominations ==
Year	Award	Category	Work	Result	Ref.
2010	Annie Awards	Production Design in a Feature Production	Coraline – Chris Appelhans	Nominated	
2015	Children's Choice Book Awards	Children's Choice Illustrator of the Year	Sparky! – Chris Appelhans	Won	
2021	Golden Rooster Awards	Best Animated Feature	Wish Dragon (with Aron Warner, Chris Bremble, Jackie Chan)	Nominated	
2021	Ursa Major Awards	Best Motion Picture	Wish Dragon – Chris Appelhans	Nominated	
2025	Alliance of Women Film Journalists	Best Animated Feature	KPop Demon Hunters (with Maggie Kang)	Won	
2025	IndieWire Honors	Spark Award	KPop Demon Hunters (with Maggie Kang and Ejae)	Honored	
2025	Korean Association of Film Critics Awards	FIPRESCI Award (Foreign)	KPop Demon Hunters (with Maggie Kang)	Won	
2025	SCAD AnimationFest	Impact Award	KPop Demon Hunters (with Maggie Kang)	Honored	
2025	Toronto Film Critics Association	Best Animated Feature	KPop Demon Hunters (with Maggie Kang)	Runner-up	
2025	World Animation Summit	Movie of the Year Award	KPop Demon Hunters (with Maggie Kang)	Honored	
2026	Academy Awards	Best Animated Feature	KPop Demon Hunters (with Maggie Kang and Michelle Wong)	Won	
2026	Annie Awards	Best Direction – Feature	KPop Demon Hunters (with Maggie Kang)	Won	
2026	Annie Awards	Best Writing – Feature	KPop Demon Hunters (with Maggie Kang, Danya Jimenez, Hannah McMechan)	Won	
2026	Astra Film Awards	Best Animated Feature	KPop Demon Hunters (with Maggie Kang and Michelle Wong)	Won	
2026	Chicago Indie Critics	Best Animated Film	KPop Demon Hunters (with Maggie Kang and Michelle Wong)	Won	
2026	Critics' Choice Movie Awards	Best Animated Feature	KPop Demon Hunters (with Maggie Kang and Michelle Wong)	Won	
2026	Golden Globe Awards	Best Motion Picture – Animated	KPop Demon Hunters (with Maggie Kang and Michelle Wong)	Won	
2026	Hugo Awards	Best Dramatic Presentation, Long Form	KPop Demon Hunters (with Maggie Kang, Danya Jimenez, Hannah McMechan)	Nominated	
2026	Humanitas Prize	Family Feature	KPop Demon Hunters (with Maggie Kang, Danya Jimenez, Hannah McMechan)	Nominated	
2026	International Cinephile Society	Best Animated Film	KPop Demon Hunters (with Maggie Kang)	Nominated	
2026	Latino Entertainment Journalists Association	Best Animated Feature	KPop Demon Hunters (with Maggie Kang)	Won	
2026	North Dakota Film Society	Best Animated Feature	KPop Demon Hunters (with Maggie Kang and Michelle Wong)	Won	

=== Listicles ===
Name of publisher, year listed, name of listicle, and placement
Publisher	Year	Listicle	Placement	Ref.
Creative	2026	Creative 100 Directors (with Maggie Kang)	Included	
The Hollywood Reporter	2026	Animation Power List (with Maggie Kang)	Included	

== Personal life ==
Appelhans met author Maurene Goo while they were students at the ArtCenter College of Design. They married in 2012, and have one son.
