= Dept. of Speculation =

2014 novel by Jenny Offill

- First edition
- Author: Jenny Offill
- Language: English
- Publisher: Alfred A. Knopf
- Publication date: January 28, 2014
- Publication place: United States
- Pages: 179 pages
- ISBN: 9780345806871

Dept. of Speculation is a 2014 novel by American author Jenny Offill. The novel received positive reviews, and has been compared to Offill's later work, Weather.

== Composition and writing ==
Though not purely autobiographical, the novel draws from Offill's life. Offill has said Dept. of Speculation "[...] came from the ashes of another book". Dept. of Speculation eschews a typical plot, which Offill has said was deliberate.

== Reception ==
=== Critical reception ===
The novel has been compared to Renata Adler's 1976 book Speedboat. In her review of the book, published by NPR, Meg Wolitzer praised the novel as "[...] intriguing, beautifully written, sly and often profound". Wolitzer also praised the novel's humor.

Offill has said she did not anticipate the book's success.

=== Honors ===
Dept. of Speculation was shortlisted for 2015 PEN/Faulkner Award for Fiction, and the Folio Prize.

The novel was included on the New York Times' list of the best books of 2014.

=== Influence ===
A passage in the novel influenced Rachel Yoder's novel Nightbitch.
