= Weather (novel) =

2020 novel by Jenny Offill

- First edition cover
- Author: Jenny Offill
- Language: English
- Publisher: Knopf Doubleday
- Publication date: February 11, 2020
- Publication place: United States
- Pages: 224
- ISBN: 9780385351102

Weather is a 2020 novel by American writer Jenny Offill. The novel is narrated by a college librarian, Lizzie. The book takes place before and after Donald Trump becomes president of the United States and depicts Lizzie's family life and her concerns about climate change. The novel received mostly positive reviews, with favorable comparisons to Offill's previous novel, Dept. of Speculation and praise for its structure.

== Composition, writing, and style ==
Offill worked on Weather for around seven years. The novel grew out of conversations between Offill and novelist Lydia Millet concerning the potential impacts of climate change. A New York Times article about Paul Kingsnorth further inspired both the novel and Offill's interest in the climate. Before Offill settled on the title Weather, the book had two earlier titles: Learning to Die and, later, American Weather. Offill changed the title from American Weather to Weather in part to avoid participating in a trend she perceived emerging after the election of Donald Trump of books published that included the word in their title.

Offill conducted extensive research about climate change while writing the novel, beginning with climatology, and then moving to psychological and sociological texts that deal with reactions to disasters and the climate. Books Offill read for research include Don't Even Think About It by George Marshall. Offill also read blogs and websites authored by survivalists and met with activists. Offill became involved with the activist organization Extinction Rebellion in part due to her research.

Offill admires Joy Williams, and Weather was in part inspired by Williams' assertion that “Real avant-garde writing today would frame and reflect our misuse of the world, our destruction of its beauties and wonders.”. Works including Amitav Ghosh's The Great Derangement and Octavia Butler's Parable of the Sower also influenced the writing and content of the novel. In an interview with Book Marks, Offill has said that Weather is "in conversation" with Don DeLillo's novel White Noise as each book includes apocalyptic themes and humor.

In an article for the New York Times, Leslie Jamison commented on the unique style of the novel. Likening the fragmented structure to Dalí's animal sketches, Jamison suggests that the "whittled narrative bursts" that Offill employs are the ideal narrative form to convey the juxtaposition of the recognizable domestic anxieties with the incomprehensibly large anxieties of global climate change. This fragmentation, she argues, is the ideal form to convey the melodrama and plotlessness of the novel's subject matter.

When writing Weather, Offill employed unconventional writing techniques to assist her in determining what passages or fragments were necessary for the novel. She printed out individual fragments and stuck them onto large poster boards. Then, over the course of the seven years she spent writing the novel, she filtered out passages that she felt were superfluous or unnecessary.

== Characters ==
- Lizzie Benson – the narrator and the protagonist of the novel. She is a librarian who struggles with recurrent feelings of anxiety and inadequacy. Lizzie is the caregiver to her family, including as her addict brother and her paranoid, religious mother. Her engagement with podcast listeners, from across the political spectrum, heightens Lizzie's anxiety. Consequently, she researches doomsday prepper websites, where she acquaints herself with unconventional survival techniques, further contributing towards her anxiety.
- Sylvia – once Lizzie's teacher, she now hosts a podcast called Hell and High Water where she facilitates discussions on the looming climate crisis. She offers Lizzie a job involving the management of emails that listeners send in regarding the podcast.
- Henry – Lizzie's brother. Henry is an anxious and recovering addict. He is codependent on Lizzie and this reliance on her grows over the course of the narrative.
- Ben – Lizzie's husband. Ben holds a PhD in classics, but is forced to take a job in IT after failing to obtain a job in his field.
- Eli – Lizzie's Minecraft-obsessed son. He is largely unaware of his parents' anxieties about climate change.

== Reception ==
=== Critical reception ===
In a review of the book for the Financial Times, Jonathan Derbyshire compared the novel to Renata Adler's 1976 book Speedboat. The two novels share similar composition, separated into brief, fragmentary anecdotes and moments drawn from the lives of their protagonists. Derbyshire also expressed his belief that a comment by author Donald Barthelme about Speedboat — that it "glimpses into the special oddities and new terrors of contemporary life" — applied to Weather as well. Derbyshire also noted that the novel, despite its focus on climate change and civilizational collapse, has moments of humor, like Offill's previous work, Dept. of Speculation. Dept. of Speculation has also garnered comparison to Adler's book due to its similar composition. The style of writing has also been compared to the works of Lydia Davis. Jake Cline, in his review of Weather for The Philadelphia Inquirer, praised Offill's utilization of short paragraphs and anecdotes, writing: "None of this hopscotching feels random. Offill is in total control here [...]".

Stephanie Bernhard, writing in a review for the Los Angeles Review of Books, referred to the novel as "cli-fi". She grouped it with other novels of the genre set in the present, distinguishing it from the "speculative future apocalypse scenarios that have defined the [...] genre".

=== Honors and accolades ===
Weather was shortlisted for the 2020 Women's Prize for Fiction. It was also longlisted for the 2021 Andrew Carnegie Medal for Excellence in Fiction. It was named by the Los Angeles Times, The Guardian, and other publications as one of the best books of 2020.
