= Pitch Dark =

Novel by Renata Adler, published in 1983

- First edition cover
- Author: Renata Adler
- Language: English
- Publisher: Alfred A. Knopf
- Publication date: November 12, 1983
- Publication place: United States
- Media type: Print
- Pages: 144 pp
- ISBN: 0-394-50374-0

Pitch Dark is a 1983 modernist novel by Renata Adler about a newspaper reporter's affair with a married man. Decades after falling out of print, Pitch Dark was reissued in 2013 by New York Review Books simultaneously with Adler's first novel, Speedboat; both works enjoyed a renewed wave of critical acclaim.
