= Shrek the Halls =

American Christmas television special

- DVD cover
- Genre: Comedy; Adventure; Mystery
- Based on: Shrek! by William Steig
- Written by: Gary Trousdale; Sean Bishop; Theresa Pettengill; Bill Riling
- Directed by: Gary Trousdale
- Starring: Mike Myers; Eddie Murphy; Cameron Diaz; Antonio Banderas; Cody Cameron; Christopher Knights; Conrad Vernon; Aron Warner
- Theme music composer: Harry Gregson-Williams
- Country of origin: United States
- Original language: English

Production
- Executive producer: Aron Warner
- Producers: Gina Shay; Teresa Cheng
- Running time: 21 minutes (30 minutes with commercials)
- Production companies: DreamWorks Animation; Pacific Data Images

Original release
- Network: ABC
- Release: November 28, 2007

Shrek the Halls is an American animated Christmas comedy television special that premiered on the American television network ABC on November 28, 2007. The thirty minute Christmas special was co-written and directed by Gary Trousdale and produced by DreamWorks Animation and Pacific Data Images. Mike Myers, Eddie Murphy, Cameron Diaz, and Antonio Banderas reprise their roles from the feature films. This Christmas special takes place after the events of Shrek the Third. It grossed $16 million in home sales.

The title is derived from the title of the Christmas carol, Deck the Halls.

== Plot ==
Sometime after the events of the third film, Shrek is living in his swamp with his family while Donkey constantly makes early Christmas announcements, much to Shrek’s annoyance. When the Christmas season arrives, Shrek reluctantly promises Princess Fiona a special Christmas surprise under Donkey’s urging. Shrek goes to a bookstore in Far Far Away to try to find a present for Fiona, but because he does not actually know what Christmas is about, the shopkeeper gives Shrek a copy of Christmas For Village Idiots, a guide to celebrating the holiday. Shrek proceeds to follow the book's advice by decorating the house and finding a tree so he can spend a quiet Christmas Eve with his family, but Donkey brings the entire "family" to the swamp, ruining Shrek's plans.

When Shrek tries to recite "The Night Before Christmas", Donkey, Puss in Boots, and Gingy interrupt and each tell their own Christmas story. Donkey tells of a Christmas parade passing by the swamp and licking an animatronic Santa Claus that is made of waffles, and absentmindedly starts licking Shrek. Puss' story ends with playing with the tassel on Santa's hat, while in reality he is playing with a bauble. Gingy tells a story about how his girlfriend, Suzy was eaten by Santa Claus. When Donkey finds Shrek's book, a fight breaks out over the book and Shrek's dinner is destroyed. After a chain reaction causes a fire to ignite on his butt, Shrek loses his temper and furiously kicks his friends out of his house.

With their Christmas spirit ruined, Fiona is upset with Shrek's behavior and leaves with the ogre triplets to apologize. Shrek, remorseful at what he has done, catches up with his friends and apologizes for lashing out at them. When he reveals that he has never celebrated Christmas or anything, Donkey starts to feel remorseful for disturbing him and jeopardizing his first Christmas. They return to the swamp where Shrek’s friends are getting ready for bedtime. When they beg Shrek to tell them a bedtime story, he tells his version of "The Night Before Christmas". Soon, they hear bells and go outside to see Santa and his reindeer, although Gingy, still afraid of Santa, runs back inside. The special ends with Santa using magic to put ogre ears on the moon.

== Cast ==
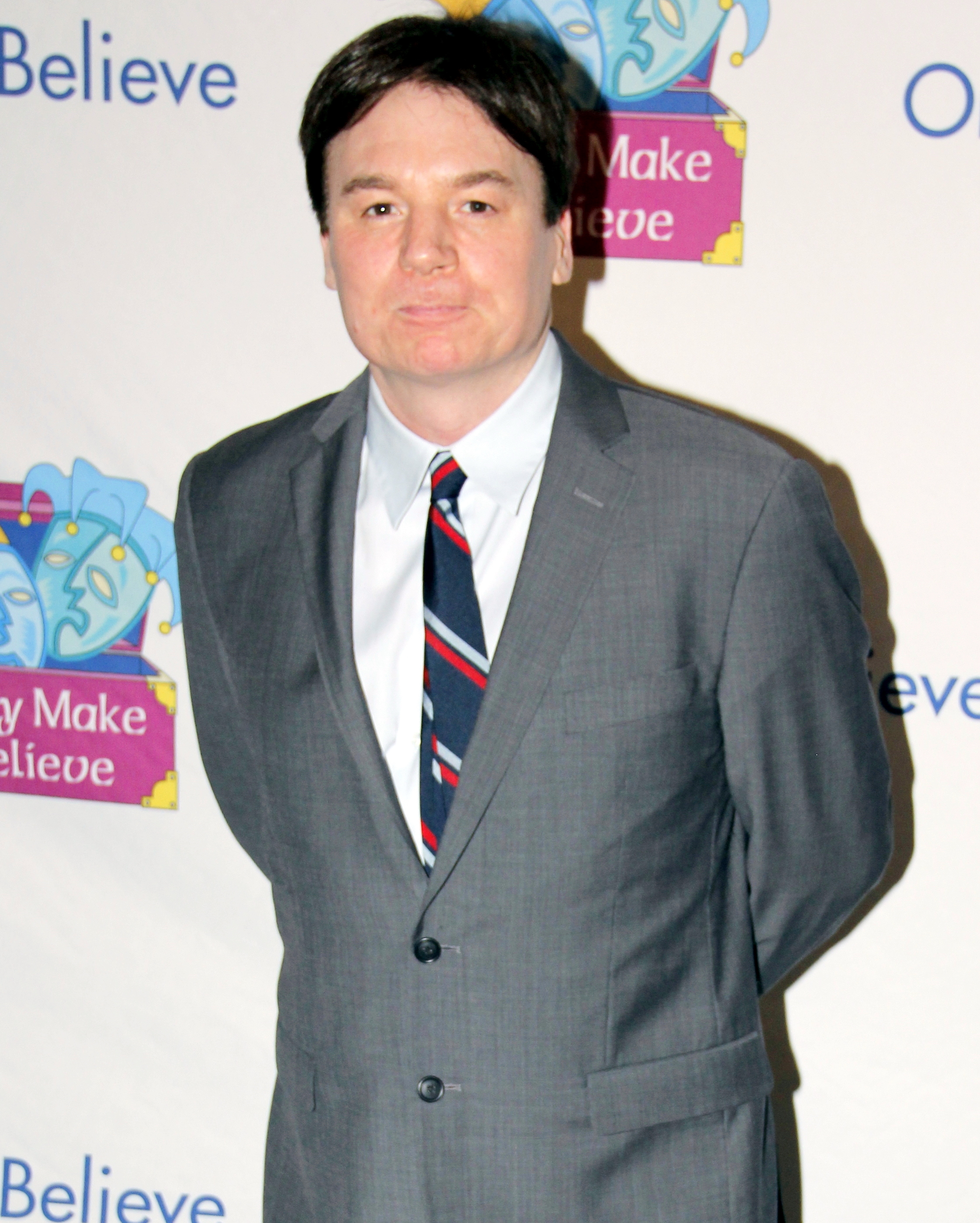
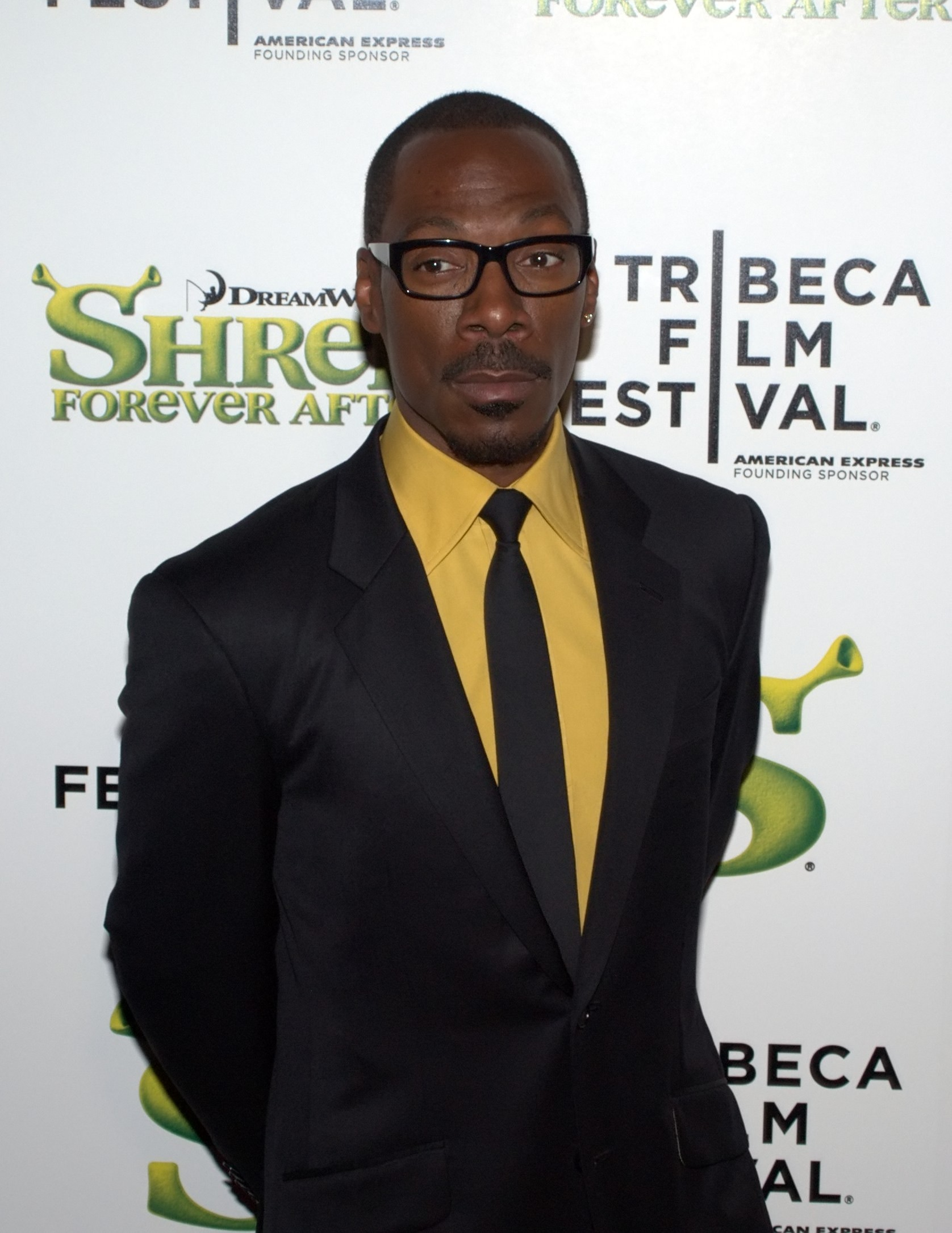
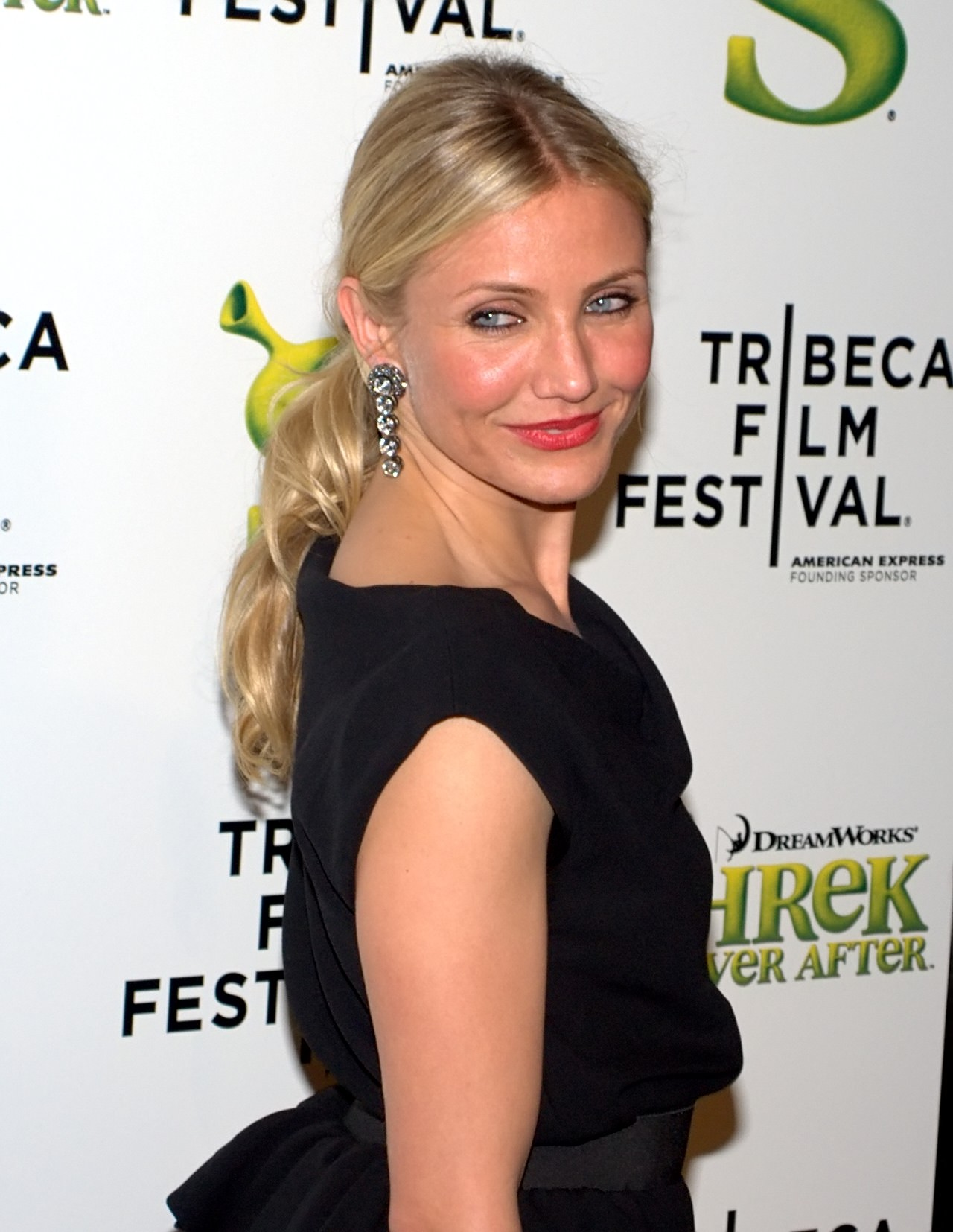
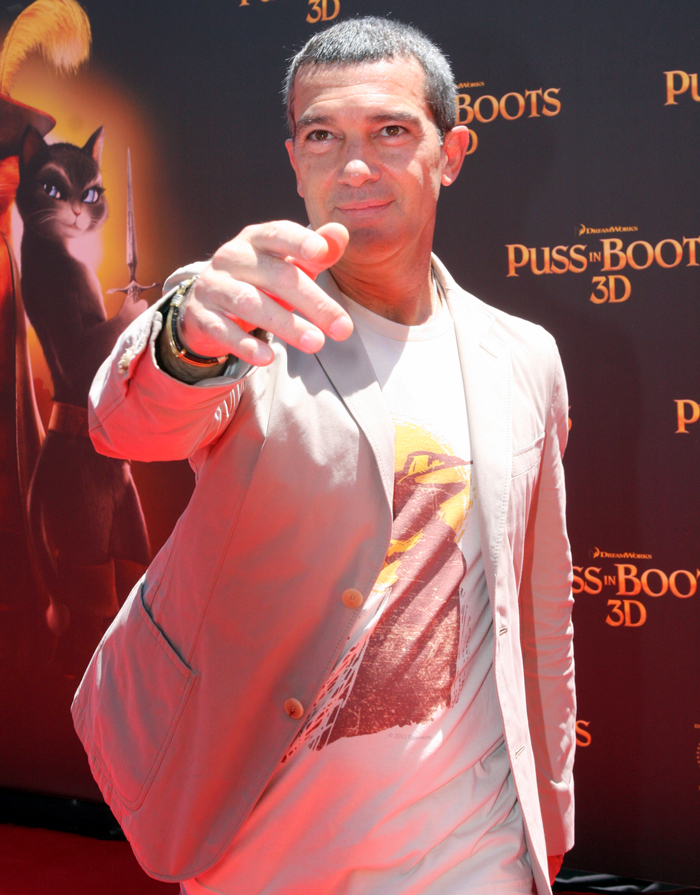
Mike Myers (in 2011), Eddie Murphy (in 2010), Cameron Diaz (in 2010) and Antonio Banderas (in 2011)
- Mike Myers as Shrek
- Eddie Murphy as Donkey
- Cameron Diaz as Princess Fiona
- Antonio Banderas as Puss in Boots
- Conrad Vernon as Gingy
- Cody Cameron as Pinocchio and Three Little Pigs
- Aron Warner as Big Bad Wolf
- Christopher Knights as Three Blind Mice
- Miles Christopher Bakshi, Nina Zoe Bakshi, and Dante James Hauser as Farkle, Fergus, & Felicia
- Marissa Jaret Winokur as Bookstore Clerk
- Gary Trousdale as Santa Claus

== Production ==
Shrek the Halls was produced by DreamWorks Animation and Pacific Data Images. David Ian Salter and Mark Baldo directed the special during the pre-production, but they were later replaced by Gary Trousdale. The film was produced by Teresa Cheng, Gina Shay and Aron Warner and was written by Bill Riling, Theresa Cullen, Gary Trousdale and Sean Bishop.

== Release ==
=== Broadcast ===
Shrek the Halls premiered on the American television network ABC on November 28, 2007. ABC held the exclusive domestic rights to the special until it moved to NBC in 2023 following NBCUniversal's 2016 acquisition of DreamWorks Animation; it first aired on that network on November 30 that year. In 2025, the special aired on Warner Bros. Discovery's holiday program blocks, TNT's Christmas Maximus and TBS's All I Watch for Christmas.

In the UK, it premiered on December 24, 2007, on BBC One. The special was repeated on BBC Three on December 23, 2011, along with Shrek: Once Upon a Time and Shrek.

=== Reception ===
On Metacritic, Shrek the Halls holds a weighted average score of 73 out of 100, based on 30 critics, indicating "generally favourable reviews".

=== Ratings ===
The rating info is courtesy of Your Entertainment Now and ABC Medianet.

==== United States Nielsen ratings ====
#	Air Date	Rating	Share	Rating/Share (18–49)	Viewers (millions)	Rank (timeslot)	Rank (night)	Rank (week)
1	November 28, 2007	11.0	17	7.2/20	21.06	1	1	3
2	December 11, 2007	5.7	9	3.4/9	9.97	3	6	21
3	December 1, 2008	6.2	10	3.3/9	11.17	1	3	19
4	December 22, 2008	3.7	6	1.8/6	6.51	TBA	TBA	TBA
5	November 30, 2009	TBA	TBA	3.2/8	10.01	TBA	TBA	TBA
6	December 9, 2009	TBA	TBA	2.6/8	8.53	TBA	TBA	TBA

==== United Kingdom viewing figures ====
Airing	Viewers (millions)
December 24, 2007	7.9
December 24, 2008	6.92*

*6.32 million (BBC One viewers) + 0.60 million (BBC Three viewers) = 6.92 (both airings were shown at the same time).

=== Home media ===
Shrek the Halls was released on DVD in the United States on November 4, 2008. Originally the special was available by itself, or in a bundle pack with Shrek the Third. The special was released on iTunes on November 2, 2008, and on Blu-ray and DVD on October 30, 2012, as part of compilation titled Dreamworks Holiday Classics. The special was re-released on DVD on October 1, 2013, along with Merry Madagascar, Kung Fu Panda Holiday, Dragons: Gift of the Night Fury, and The Croods. DreamWorks Holiday Classics, available on Amazon, features Donkey's Caroling Christmas-tacular and does not feature Shrek the Halls.

HarperFestival also published a picture book version of Shrek the Halls, authored by Catherine Hapka and illustrated by Michael Koelsch. Koelsch had previously illustrated a picture book for Shrek 2 in 2004.

== Music ==
The score of the special was composed by Harry Gregson-Williams. The special, like the films, also features the following Pop culture and Christmas songs:

- "Summer Breeze"
- "Jingle Bells" (sung by Eddie Murphy)
- "Here We Come A-wassailing" (sung by I'm from Barcelona)
- "Because We Can"
- "Jingo (Gin Go La Ba)"
- "Ride of the Valkyries"
- "The Twelve Days of Christmas"
- "Santa Claus is Comin' to Town"
- "O Fortuna"
- "Christmas Wrapping" (sung by The Waitresses in the main body of the special, and The Donnas in the credits)
- "Gonna Make You Sweat (Everybody Dance Now)"
- "Don't Stop Believin'"
- "Hello Ma Baby"
- "Hallelujah Chorus"
- "Deck the Halls"
- "The Stars Shine in the Sky Tonight"

== ICE! ==
In July 2011, as part of a strategic partnership between DreamWorks Animation and Gaylord Hotels, Shrek the Halls was presented as the theme of the ICE! exhibit at Gaylord's hotels in Texas and Florida. In this presentation, the plot of the film is told through a series of ice sculptures that visitors walk past.

== See also ==
- List of Christmas films
- Santa Claus in film
