= Robert Zemeckis's unproduced projects =

During his long career, American film director Robert Zemeckis has worked on several projects which never progressed beyond the pre-production stage. Some of these projects fell in development hell, were officially cancelled, were in development limbo or would see life under a different production team.

== 1970s ==
=== Growing Up ===
In the late 1970s, Zemeckis and his writing partner Bob Gale were approached by Steven Spielberg to script a small, low-budget film about Spielberg's own childhood in Arizona that he could quickly make before shooting 1941. Growing Up, alternately titled Clearwater and After School, was described as a "foul-mouthed, R-rated comedy about 12-year-olds". The film was set to shoot in May 1978, but Spielberg backed out.

== 1980s ==
=== Gangland ===
In 1982, Zemeckis and co-collaborator Bob Gale wrote the screenplay for a planned Prohibition-era film entitled Gangland, set in Chicago.

=== Cocoon ===
Before the release of Romancing the Stone, Zemeckis was attached to direct Cocoon, and had spent a year working on it. Due to the commercial failure of his previous two films, Zemeckis was replaced by Ron Howard.

=== Carpool ===
In 1986, filmmaker Brian De Palma was slated to direct a film from a script written by Zemeckis and Bob Gale titled Carpool, to be produced by Steven Spielberg. The film was never made.

== 1990s ==
=== The Great Houdini ===
In the early 1990s, Zemeckis signed on to direct The Great Houdini, a biopic of Harry Houdini written by Jeffrey Price and Peter S. Seaman, envisioned as a "magical special effects-laden adventure". Tom Cruise was eyed to play the lead, and Columbia and Universal were set to finance and distribute the film as a joint production. Though Zemeckis deemed Seamen and Price's script to be "the most interesting, dynamic, and most filmic of all the versions", by September 1992 he admitted that he "[wasn't] 100% certain what direction the project [needed] to take." Visual effects artist Ken Ralston briefly worked on the production and later cited it as a film he wish had been made, noting how Zemeckis was "thinking of a very interesting way" of telling the story.

=== Sgt. Rock ===
According to a January 1991 issue of Starlog magazine, Zemeckis was the director then-attached to helm the long-developed DC Comics property Sgt. Rock, with Jeffrey Boam mentioned as the most recent writer who had taken a crack at the script.

=== Last Action Hero ===
In 1992, Zemeckis was under consideration to direct Last Action Hero starring Arnold Schwarzenegger, after director John McTiernan had turned the film down the first time.

=== Alvin and the Chipmunks ===
In 1997, Zemeckis was slated to direct a live action Alvin and the Chipmunks film, with Steven Spielberg producing for Universal Pictures. However, by 2000, the estate of Ross Bagdasarian Sr. filed suit against Universal for which development on the film was cancelled. A live action/CGI film was ultimately released by 20th Century Fox in 2007.

=== Tesla ===
Around 1997—98, Zemeckis was one of several names circling to direct Tesla, centered on the 19th century inventor Nikola Tesla. David Lynch and Jack Nicholson were also said to be interested in making a film of Tesla in the 1990s. The script was written by Randall Jahnson and was set up at Warner Bros. According to VFX artist Ken Ralston, he was involved at the time when Zemeckis was attached as the possible director. "I just thought that would be so cool," Ralston said. "Especially in Bob's hands. But who knows why things happen or don't happen."

=== Glory Days ===
In March 1998, Ben Affleck was eyed by Warner Bros. to play the lead in a character-based drama directed by Zemeckis, with the working title of Glory Days. Barra Grant wrote the script.

=== Men... remake ===
On June 23, 1998, it was reported that a remake of the German film Men... was being scripted by Barra Grant for Zemeckis to direct. The project was developed under Barry Levinson's Baltimore Productions and Paula Weinstein's Spring Creek Productions. By April 3, 1999, Damon Santostefano was selected to direct the film instead. Variety indicated that when the project was initially being planned as a directed vehicle for Zemeckis, it had a script by Elaine May, with Grant later performing rewrites.

=== The Great War ===
In 1999, Zemeckis became attached to and was planning to direct a war film, as a co-production between 20th Century Fox and DreamWorks, about a group of American soldiers trying to survive to see the closing days of World War I. The script, entitled The Great War, was written by Eric Roth. Mel Gibson was approached for the main role, Captain John McCaffey.

== 2000s ==
=== Macabre remake ===
In 2000, it was reported that Zemeckis was slated to direct a remake of William Castle's Macabre, budgeted at $15–20 million and planned to be shot in a "rough style" reminiscent of the Dogme 95 filmmaking movement. The film was to have been produced through Zemeckis and Joel Silver's three-picture Dark Castle deal with Warner Bros., following the company's remake of Castle's 13 Ghosts.

=== M.A.D.: The Life and Times of Curtis LeMay ===
In the early 2000s, John Milius was writing a script for a biopic about U.S. Air Force general Curtis LeMay, which Zemeckis would have directed.

=== The Nutcracker ===
On November 26, 2009, Zemeckis had signed on to produce and direct the motion capture animated film adaptation of E.T.A. Hoffmann’s The Nutcracker through ImageMovers Digital for Walt Disney Pictures. On July 21, 2016, Universal Pictures revived the adaptation, which may or may not use motion capture, with Zemeckis only set to produce the film and Evan Spiliotopoulos was hired to write the script. There have been no further updates since.

== 2010s ==
=== How to Survive a Garden Gnome Attack ===
On April 14, 2011, Zemeckis had signed on to produce and potentially direct the live-action/animated hybrid film adaptation of Chuck Sambuchino's book How to Survive a Garden Gnome Attack along with The Gotham Group and Sony Pictures Animation. In November that year, Chad Damiani and JP Lavin were hired to write the script.

=== Replay ===
On April 29, 2011, Zemeckis was set to direct the film adaptation of Replay after Ben Affleck left the project. On October 3, 2012, Greg Berlanti was set to direct the film adaptation.

=== Here There Be Monsters ===
On July 26, 2011, Zemeckis was attached to direct the Brian Helgeland-scripted Here There Be Monsters, a fictionalized account of the career of British naval officer John Paul Jones, who ran afoul of a sea monster.

=== Taking Flight ===
On August 6, 2012, The Hollywood Reporter announced that Zemeckis had boarded the biographical crime drama Taking Flight about Colton Harris-Moore, for 20th Century Fox. He developed the project as a directing vehicle after David Gordon Green dropped out. However, the film fell into development hell and its fate is unknown after Disney's acquisition of Fox was completed.

=== Billy Ray TV series ===
On September 24, 2013, it was reported that Zemeckis was set executive produce Clifton Campbell's television series Billy Ray and direct the pilot episode for Fox.

=== The King ===
On August 29, 2018, Zemeckis was set to direct The King about Kamehameha I, with Randall Wallace writing the script and Dwayne Johnson set to star at Warner Bros. and New Line Cinema.

== 2020s ==
=== Ares ===
On January 10, 2020, it was reported that Zemeckis was in final negotiations to direct and produce the sci-fi thriller Ares for Warner Bros., from a script written by Geneva Robertson-Dworet.

=== Back to the Future: The Musical film ===
According to Zemeckis, Universal Pictures rejected his pitch for a proposed musical film version of the 2020 stage production Back to the Future (itself based on his own 1985 film), which he was interested in returning to direct.

== Offers ==
=== Star Wars: Episode I – The Phantom Menace ===
In the 1990s, Zemeckis was one of three directors, including Ron Howard and Steven Spielberg, in talks with George Lucas to direct Star Wars: Episode I – The Phantom Menace. Howard revealed on a 2015 Happy Sad Confused podcast episode that the task was too daunting for the three of them, and Lucas ended up directing it himself.

=== Superman reboot ===
On November 1, 2010, Zemeckis was offered to direct a Superman reboot, but passed on it which led to Man of Steel.

=== The Wizard of Oz remake ===
On November 16, 2010, it was announced that Warner Bros. was in early talks with Zemeckis to direct a live action remake of the 1939 classic The Wizard of Oz, using the original script. Zemeckis later revealed that he had turned the offer down, saying "I don't know how to improve that movie."

=== The Flash ===
On May 16, 2017, Zemeckis was offered to direct The Flash.

== Producer only ==
=== Mort the Dead Teenager ===
On April 14, 1997, Zemeckis and Steven Spielberg were attached to produce a film version of Mort the Dead Teenager at DreamWorks with Jim Cooper writing the script. Elijah Wood was in talks for the starring role of Mort and Dominique Swain as his love interest.

=== Fireflies ===
On May 20, 1997, Zemeckis was slated to produce the romantic drama Fireflies, with Mitch Glazer writing the newest screenplay draft for Universal Pictures.

=== The Cobra Event ===
On September 19, 1997, Zemeckis was slated to produce the film adaptation of Richard Preston's novel The Cobra Event for DreamWorks Pictures.

=== How Georgie Radbourn Saved Baseball ===
On January 6, 1999, Zemeckis was slated to produce the film adaptation of David Shannon's illustrated children's book How Georgie Radbourn Saved Baseball with Gore Verbinski set to direct from a screenplay written by Shannon & Garrett Schiff through ImageMovers.

=== Thursday Night ===
On July 22, 2022, screenwriter Mike Binder told Ain't It Cool News that he was developing multiple scripts, including one, Thursday Night, that Zemeckis was producing.

=== Borgia ===
On November 2, 2005, Zemeckis had signed on to produce Neil Jordan's historical drama Borgia through ImageMovers, which eventually became a TV series on Showtime.

=== Calling All Robots ===
On March 26, 2008, Michael Dougherty was set to direct the animated sci-fi adventure film Calling All Robots with Zemeckis producing the film through ImageMovers Digital for Walt Disney Pictures.

=== Timeless ===
On September 29, 2010, Warner Bros announced that Zemeckis would produce Mike Thompson's time-travel script Timeless through ImageMovers.

=== Animated American ===
On May 17, 2011, Zemeckis was slated to produce the live-action/animated hybrid film Animated American for Disney with Rob Edwards writing the script.

=== Demonologist ===
On February 22, 2012, Universal Pictures announced plans for a film adaptation of Andrew Pyper’s novel Demonologist, with Zemeckis producing the film through ImageMovers and Universal Pictures was set to distribute the film, with Robert Schenkkan and Jonathan Herman were hired to write drafts of the film's screenplay.

=== The Magic Catalogue ===
On October 8, 2012, Disney announced that Jason Fuchs will write Chris Appelhans’ original sci-fi adventure story The Magic Catalogue and Zemeckis set to produce the film with his ImageMovers production team.

=== Rose ===
On August 5, 2013, Zemeckis was set to produce Nathaniel Halpern's script Rose through ImageMovers for Focus Features.

=== The Execution of Noa P. Singleton ===
On August 21, 2013, Zemeckis was set to produce the film adaptation of Elizabeth L. Silver’s novel The Execution of Noa P. Singleton through ImageMovers.

=== The Gafin Academy ===
On June 8, 2016, Zemeckis was set to co-produce the film The Gafin Academy with Voltage Films, John & Drew Dowdle set to direct, and Aaron Rapke and Stewart Kaye adapting Danny King’s novel School for Scumbags.

=== Untitled Genghis Khan tomb hunting film ===
On August 15, 2017, Zemeckis was set to produce an untitled Genghis Khan tomb hunting film for Universal Pictures, with Evan Spiliotopoulos writing the script and Dwayne Johnson set to produce and potentially star.

=== Steel Soldiers ===
On February 6, 2018, Zemeckis was set to produce the sci-fi action film Steel Soldiers with Ken Kaufman writing the script.

=== The Cove TV series ===
On September 10, 2018, it was reported that Zemeckis would executive produce Chad Fiveash and James Stoteraux's television series The Cove for The CW.

=== Be More Chill ===
On October 20, 2018, it was reported that Zemeckis would've produced the film adaptation of Joe Iconis' musical adaptation of the novel Be More Chill through ImageMovers, but Shawn Levy and Greg Berlanti acquired the project.

=== Mr. Lucky ===
On April 15, 2021, it was reported that Zemeckis would develop and produce Aaron and Jordan Kandell's original comedy pitch Mr. Lucky for his ImageMovers production company.

=== Real Steel TV series ===
On January 14, 2022, it was reported that a television series based on Real Steel was in early development for Disney+, with Zemeckis and Jack Rapke of Compari Entertainment set to executive produce.
