= Firth, Idaho =

City in Bingham County, Idaho, United States

- Town
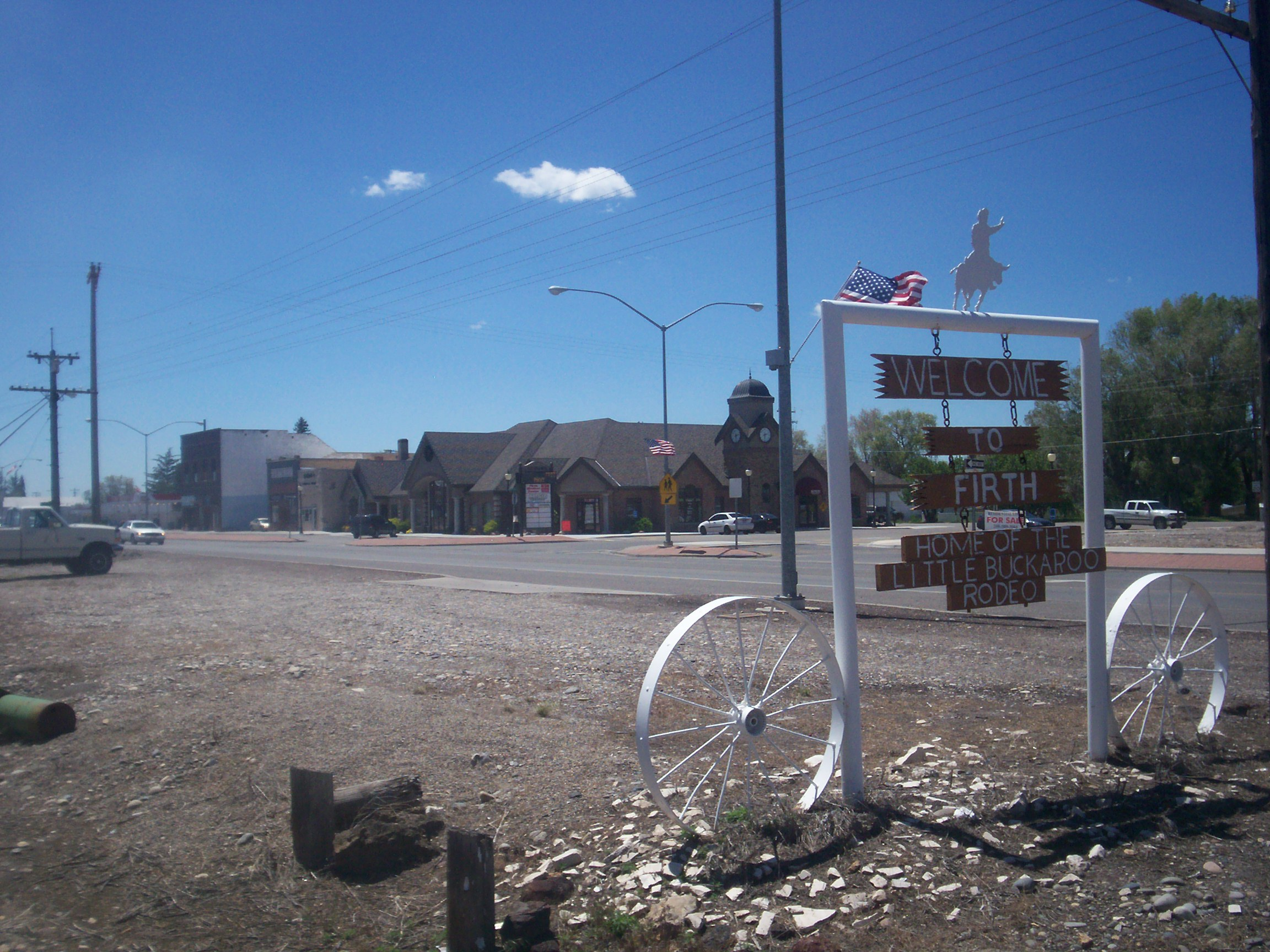
- Welcome sign along North State Street (U.S. Route 91) in Firth, June 2008

- Location of Firth in Bingham County, Idaho.
- Coordinates: 43°18′21″N 112°11′00″W
- Country: United States
- State: Idaho
- County: Bingham

Area
  - Total: 0.57 sq mi (1.48 km^{2})
  - Land: 0.57 sq mi (1.48 km^{2})
  - Water: 0 sq mi (0.00 km^{2})
- Elevation: 4,567 ft (1,392 m)

Population (2020)
  - Total: 517
- Time zone: UTC-7 (Mountain (MST))
  - Summer (DST): UTC-6 (MDT)
- ZIP code: 83236
- Area codes: 208, 986
- FIPS code: 16-27910
- GNIS feature ID: 2410508
- Website: firthidaho.gov

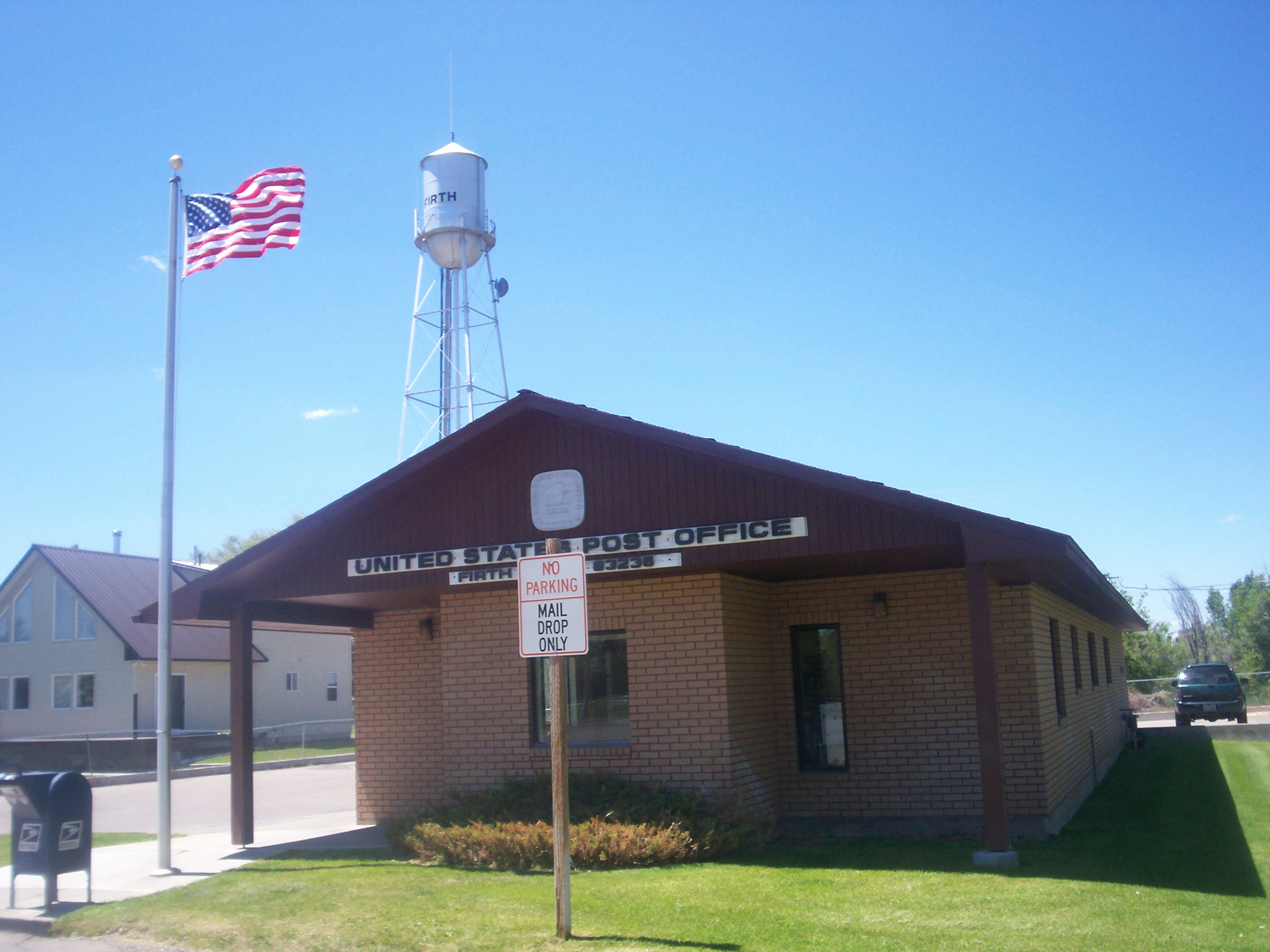
The Firth post office and water tower

Firth is a town in Bingham County, Idaho, United States. The population was 517 at the 2020 census.

== Geography ==
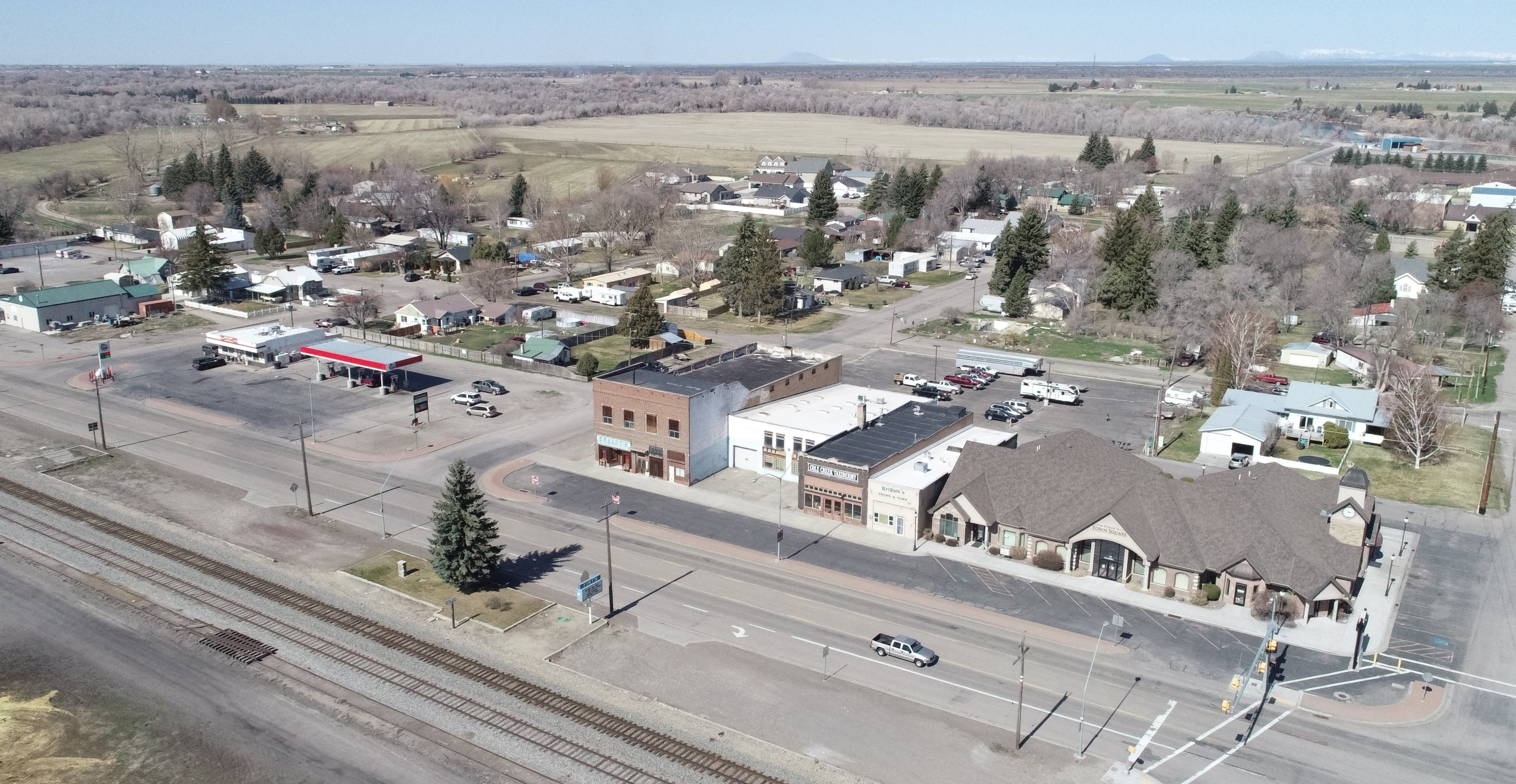
North State Street (U.S. Route 91) in Firth, April 2022

According to the United States Census Bureau, the town has a total area of 0.54 square miles (1.40 km^{2}), all of it land.

Firth is located on the eastern side of the Snake River, facing the Blackfoot Mountains.

== History ==
Firth began as a Swedish settlement in 1885. It was named for Lorenzo J. Firth, an English emigrant, who gave land for the railroad section house and water tank; the railroad named the station for him in 1903. The post office was established in 1905. The town hosts Firth cemetery (known as Dye cemetery before 1935).

== Demographics ==
Historical population
Census	Pop.	Note	%±
1930	236		—
1940	242		2.5%
1950	293		21.1%
1960	322		9.9%
1970	362		12.4%
1980	460		27.1%
1990	429		−6.7%
2000	408		−4.9%
2010	477		16.9%
2020	517		8.4%
U.S. Decennial Census

=== 2010 census ===
At the 2010 census, there were 477 people in 168 households, including 121 families, in the town. The population density was 883.3 inhabitants per square mile (341.0/km^{2}). There were 173 housing units at an average density of 320.4 per square mile (123.7/km^{2}) The racial makup of the town was 79.5% White, 2.1% Native American, 0.4% Pacific Islander, 14.5% from other races, and 3.6% from two or more races Hispanic or Latino of any race were 25.2%.

Of the 168 households 42.3% had children under the age of 18 living with them, 57.1% were married couples living together, 10.7% had a female householder with no husband present, 4.2% had a male householder with no wife present, and 28.0% were non-families 26.2% of households were one person and 14.3% were one person aged 65 or older The average household size was 2.84 and the average family size was 3.45.

The median age was 31.4 years 31.4% of residents were under the age of 18; 8.4% were between the ages of 18 and 24; 24.7% were from 25 to 44; 23.1% were from 45 to 64; and 12.2% were 65 or older. The gender makeup of the town was 50.5% male and 49.5% female.

=== 2000 census ===
At the 2000 census, there were 408 people in 142 households, including 100 families, in the town. The population density was 2,139.7 inhabitants per square mile (826.1/km^{2}) There were 148 housing units at an average density of 776.2 per square mile (299.7/km^{2}) The racial makup of the town was 70.34% White, 0.25% African American, 0.49% Native American, 20.83% from other races, and 8.09% from two or more races Hispanic or Latino of any race were 29.17%.

Of the 142 households, 42.3% had children under the age of 18 living with them, 59.9% were married couples living together, 8.5% had a female householder with no husband present, and 28.9% were non-families 26.8% of households were one person, and 15.5% were one person aged 65 or older. The average household size was 2.87, and the average family size was 3.48.

The age distribution was 33.3% under the age of 18, 9.1% from 18 to 24, 25.2% from 25 to 44, 19.6% from 45 to 64, and 12.7% 65 or older. The median age was 32 years. For every 100 females, there were 91.5 males. For every 100 females age 18 and over, there were 100.0 males.

The median household income was $23,239 and the median income for a family was $27,500 Males had a median income of $27,292 versus $17,917 for females The per capita income for the town was $10,458 About 20.0% of families and 25.7% of the population were below the poverty line, including 39.8% of those under age 18 and 15.3% of those age 65 or over.

== Community ==
Firth has an active community life The Firth Symphony Orchestra is a 50 piece orchestra composed of residents of Firth, nearby Basalt, and several individuals from Rexburg to Pocatello The Orchestra performs at several community events like the 4th of July breakfast, Spud Days (in the nearby town of Shelley), Veterans Day Concert, and Christmas Concert which are all free to the public The orchestra was organized in 2001.

There are 2 parades each year in Firth. The Firth School District hosts the Homecoming Parade in the fall, and the Christmas Lights Parade in December. The parades attract primarily residents.

== Notable people ==
- Chris Appelhans — filmmaker and illustrator, co-director and co-writer of Kpop Demon Hunters (2025)

== See also ==
- List of cities in Idaho
