= Maurene Goo =

American author

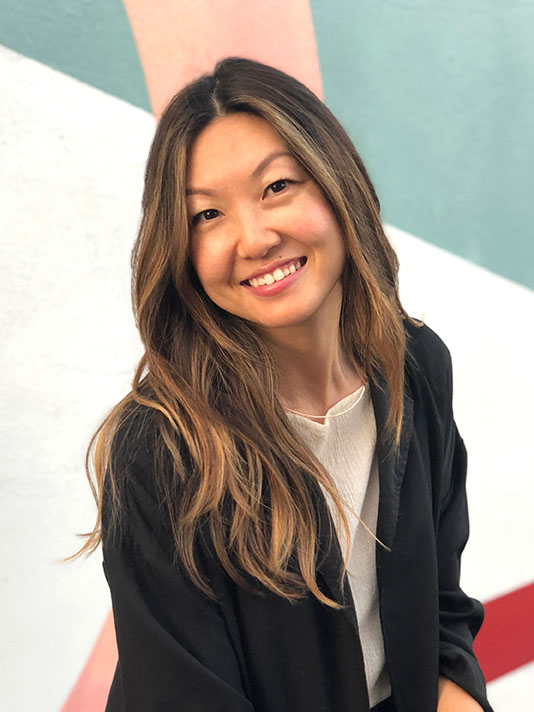
- Goo in 2018
- Born: Los Angeles, California, U.S.
- Education: University of California, San Diego; Emerson College
- Spouse: Chris Appelhans (m. 2012)
- Children: 1
- Writing career
- Years active: 2013–present
- Genres: Young adult fiction, comics
- Website: maurenegoo.com

Maurene Goo is an American author. Her books have been translated into twelve languages and two of her novels, I Believe in a Thing Called Love and Somewhere Only We Know, have been optioned to be made into feature films by Netflix.

== Life and education ==
Maurene Goo was born in Los Angeles to Korean parents and was raised in Glendale, California. She studied communication and English literature at UC San Diego and has a master's in publishing and writing from Emerson College. Prior to publishing her debut novel, Since You Asked, she worked in publishing and design.

In 2012, she married illustrator Christopher Appelhans. Their son was born in 2020.

== Career ==
Goo's first young adult novel, Since You Asked, was published in 2013 with Scholastic. Her sophomore novel, I Believe in A Thing Called Love, was released in 2017, followed by The Way You Make Me Feel in 2018, Somewhere Only We Know in 2019, and Throwback in 2023.

In 2021, Goo completed a five-issue run for Marvel Comics about Korean-American superhero Silk, entitled Threats and Menaces. Takeshi Miyazawa illustrated the limited series in comic book.

Her work has been critically acclaimed and award-winning, receiving multiple starred reviews from Publishers Weekly, Kirkus Reviews, and Booklist, and has appeared on several "Best Book" lists, including NPR (2017, 2018), Cosmo (2019), The Boston Globe (2018), and The New York Public Library (2017, 2018). The Way You Make Me Feel won the California Library Association's John and Patricia Beatty Award, and was a finalist for the California Book Award.

== Works ==
=== Novels ===
- Since You Asked (Scholastic, 2013)
- I Believe in a Thing Called Love (Farrar, Straus and Giroux, 2017)
- The Way You Make Me Feel (Farrar, Straus and Giroux, 2018)
- Somewhere Only We Know (Farrar, Straus and Giroux, 2019)
- Throwback (Zando, 2023)
- One & Only (G.P. Putnam's & Sons, 2026)

=== Short stories ===
- in Our Stories, Our Voices: 21 YA Authors Get Real About Injustice, Empowerment, and Growing Up Female in America (Simon Pulse, 2018)
- in Come On In (Inkyard Press, 2020)
- in Up All Night (Algonquin, 2021)

=== Comic series ===
- Silk: Threats and Menaces (Marvel Comics, 2020), illustrated by Takeshi Miyazawa
