= Wish Dragon =

2021 Sony Pictures Animation film

- Promotional release poster
- Directed by: Chris Appelhans
- Written by: Chris Appelhans
- Produced by: Aron Warner; Chris Bremble; Jackie Chan
- Starring: Jimmy Wong; John Cho; Constance Wu; Natasha Liu Bordizzo; Jimmy O. Yang; Aaron Yoo; Will Yun Lee; Ronny Chieng
- Edited by: Michael Andrews
- Music by: Philip Klein
- Production companies: Sony Pictures Animation; Beijing Sparkle Roll Media Corporation; Tencent Pictures; Flagship Entertainment Group; Base Media
- Distributed by: Sony Pictures Releasing (under Columbia Pictures; China); Netflix (International)
- Release dates: January 15, 2021 (China); June 11, 2021 (International)
- Running time: 98 minutes
- Countries: United States; China
- Languages: English; Mandarin
- Budget: $25 million
- Box office: $25.9 million

Wish Dragon is a 2021 animated fantasy comedy film written and directed by Chris Appelhans in his directorial debut. The film stars Jimmy Wong, John Cho, Constance Wu, Natasha Liu Bordizzo, Jimmy O. Yang, Aaron Yoo, Will Yun Lee, and Ronny Chieng. Jackie Chan produced the film and voiced Cho's role in the Chinese Mandarin version. It tells the story about a college student named Din Song (Wong), who encounters a teapot inhabited by a dragon named Long (Cho), who has the power to grant three wishes.

Wish Dragon was released theatrically in China on January 15, 2021, and on Netflix internationally on June 11, 2021. The film received mixed to positive reviews from critics. A sequel is set to be released in summer 2027, with Appelhans returning as writer.

== Plot ==
Din Song is a working-class college student in Shanghai who dreams of reuniting with his childhood friend Li Na, who moved away ten years ago from their shikumen neighborhood with her father, Mr. Wang, and now lives a lavish life. One day, Din is given a teapot by an elderly man, from which emerges Long, a wish dragon. Long informs Din he will grant three wishes to his master, i.e. whoever holds the teapot. Din will be Long's tenth and final master and will free Long from his servitude, allowing him to enter the Spirit world. Subsequently, Din is chased by a trio of goons led by a man named Pockets, sent by Mr. Wang to recover the teapot in hopes of saving his failing business. Din uses his first wish to fight the goons and escape.

The next day, Din and Long arrive at Li Na's birthday party. Din makes his second wish to appear as a wealthy princeling for one day, hoping Li Na will notice him and rekindle their friendship. Li Na is disappointed when she learns her father will not be attending her birthday party. Din, sticking to his disguise as 'Dan', comforts her, and they are asked by Mr. Wang (via a video call) to share a meal together. Long warns Din that Li Na will leave him as soon as she finds out his identity, because of their different socioeconomic status.

During the date, Din asks Long for advice on how to act accordingly to his new status, but ends up upsetting Li Na in the process. They both end up in Din's neighborhood after the goons pursue Din again. Din reveals himself to Li Na, and they spend the rest of the day in the neighborhood, reliving their childhood pastimes. However, Li Na finally retreats claiming that she has responsibilities and expectations she needs to meet, hurting Din's feelings. Later that night, Din angrily asks Long to make him rich in a last-ditch effort to be respected. Long reveals that in life, he was a wealthy and powerful lord whose reign ended in loneliness and tragedy, and after his death he was made a wish dragon by the gods as punishment for his selfishness. Long's servitude as a wish dragon is meant to make him appreciate the meaning of life, something he has failed to accomplish with all of his previous masters.

After tracking down Din, Pockets betrays Mr. Wang by taking the teapot for himself and asks the wish dragon for his first wish to turn everything he touches to gold. He pushes Mr. Wang from a large scaffolding, mortally wounding him in front of Li Na. Din chases the goons, and eventually ends up fighting Pockets on Long's back. Pockets corners Din and prepares to hit him with his golden hand, but Long sacrifices himself by shielding Din, and turns into a gold statue. Din ultimately kicks Pockets off Long, causing his hand to come into contact with himself and petrify him on the way down. Pockets shatters to pieces against the ground, but Long falls into a river. Din is unable to stop it from sinking.

Long finds his human self at the entrance to the Spirit world. Despite being tempted to go through the gates, he pleads with the guardian of the gate to return to Din because he has not used his third wish. The guardian agrees, on one condition. Din uses his last wish to heal Mr. Wang, and Long disappears.

Sometime later, Mr. Wang starts a restaurant featuring Din's mother's cooking, with both Din and Li Na helping. Din finds a teapot like the one Long resided in and releases him. Long tells Din the sole condition for his return to Earth was to stay and serve ten more masters. After saying goodbye to Long, Din places the teapot on a carriage driven by the elderly man from the beginning, who is actually the guardian of the gate to the Spirit world.

== Voice cast ==
- Jimmy Wong as Din Song, a working-class college student who dreams to reunite with his childhood friend Li Na
  - Ian Chen as young Din
- John Cho as Long, a cynical but all-powerful dragon capable of granting wishes
- Constance Wu as Mrs. Song, Din's loving but strict mother
- Natasha Liu Bordizzo as Li Na Wang, Din's childhood friend, who moved with her father years ago from the neighborhood where she lived and now lives a lavish life
  - Alyssa Abiera as young Li Na
- Jimmy O. Yang as Short Goon, one of Pockets' goons; and a security guard
- Aaron Yoo as Pockets, a henchman hired by Wang to retrieve the teapot that Din has and the main antagonist
- Will Yun Lee as Mr. Wang, Li Na's absent but caring father, whose company business is failing
- Ronny Chieng as Pipa God, the guardian of the gate to the Spirit world

Nico Santos and Bobby Lee voice, respectively: Buckley, Mr. Wang's assistant; and Diao (credited as "Tall Goon"), one of Pockets' goons. The film's writer/director Chris Appelhans voices a hot towel waiter and a Nomani retailer. Niu Junfeng and Jackie Chan voice Din and Long, respectively, in the film's Mandarin dub.

== Production ==
Wish Dragon is the first Sony Pictures Animation film to be produced by Base Animation, a new animation studio that is part of the VFX firm Base FX, and also the first to feature visual effects and animation provided by Industrial Light & Magic. The goal of the film and the Base Animation studio is to "make world-class animation in China for China... and the world". Writer and director Chris Appelhans "wanted the film made in China, with a strong Mainland China creative team, an international cast of talent, and a focus on the hopes and dreams of contemporary China." The film is Appelhans' directorial debut and is based on his friendship with Michael Wu, a cousin of his colleague he met during a visit to China in 2014.

=== Music ===
The musical score is composed by Philip Klein and was released through Milan Records on June 11, 2021.

== Release ==
Wish Dragon was originally scheduled to be released on July 26, 2019, but at the Annecy International Animated Film Festival it was confirmed that it was delayed to 2020. In October, it was confirmed by Kipo and the Age of Wonderbeasts' creator Radford Sechrist (who served as head of story on the film) that the film would instead be released in 2021. The film was released in China on January 15, 2021.

The film was released on Netflix on June 11, 2021, as part of its summer slate.

== Reception ==
=== Critical reception ===
On the review aggregator website Rotten Tomatoes, 71% of 24 critics' reviews are positive, with an average rating of 6.20/10. The website's consensus reads: "Although its juvenile humor may test some viewers' patience, Wish Dragon is a colorful and quirky romp that will warm audience's hearts." Metacritic, which uses a weighted average, assigned the film a score of 59 out of 100, based on six critics, indicating "mixed or average" reviews.

Jennifer Green of Common Sense Media gave the film four stars out of five, saying it was "a China-set animated comedy has great messages, some scares." Peter Debruge of Variety Magazine wrote the film's "contemporary China-based fantasy boasts a charming riff on 'Aladdin.'" Natalia Winkelman of The New York Times wrote that "Netflix's newest animation effort is essentially Disney's 'Aladdin' transposed to Shanghai." Petrana Radulovic of Polygon wrote that it "doesn't go [particularly] far beyond predictable parameters, but that isn’t necessarily bad. It can be enough to see what well-worn fairy tale plot elements look like in an entirely new setting, one that gives them new resonance and relevance." Caroline Siede of The A.V. Club gave the film a rating of 'B-' and wrote "thoughtful if slightly underbaked commentary on hustle culture and social status in the modern era," and noted that "the youngest of viewers could probably recognize they're watching Aladdin transported to 21st-century China." Sandy Schaefer of Comic Book Resources wrote that "it's a mostly enjoyable spin on a familiar tale that has valuable lessons to impart […]." Mae Abdulbaki of Screen Rant gave the film three stars out of five, writing, "a heartwarming, charming film with a great message and lovely characters." She also noted that the animation style is "exciting as well, sharp, distinct, and colorful." Joseph Stanichar of Paste Magazine says "A simple, cute, unoriginal animated film that seldom impresses, but still warms your heart a little."

=== Accolades ===
Year	Award	Category	Nominee	Result	Ref.
2021	Golden Rooster Awards	Best Animated Feature	Wish Dragon	Nominated	
2021	Ursa Major Awards	Best Motion Picture	Chris Appelhans	Nominated	
2022	49th Annie Awards	Best Character Animation - Feature	Ketan Adikhari	Nominated	
2022	2021 International Film Music Critics Awards	Best Original Score for an Animated Feature	Philip Klein	Nominated	

== Sequel ==
In an interview with Animation World Network in August 2025, it was revealed that Chris Appelhans was writing a sequel to Wish Dragon. At the 38th Golden Rooster Awards Film Promotion Event, the sequel was announced to be released in summer 2027, with producer Chris Bremble taking over as director.
