= Aron Warner =

American film producer and actor

- Born: Aron J. Warner; United States
- Occupations: Producer; screenwriter; actor
- Years active: 1984–present
- Awards: Academy Award for Best Animated Feature; Shrek (2001)

Aron J. Warner is an American film producer, screenwriter, and voice actor, best known for producing the Shrek films. He also provided voice roles, most notably the Big Bad Wolf in the Shrek series. He was known as the first person to win the Academy Award for Best Animated Feature.

== Life and career ==
Warner joined PDI/DreamWorks in 1997 to serve as a producer on the animated film Antz, which marked the first collaboration between PDI and DreamWorks. Warner went on to become head of PDI/DreamWorks from 2000 to 2002. Warner had previously held the post of vice president of production at Twentieth Century Fox, where he supervised production on such films as Independence Day, The Ice Storm, The Crucible, Alien Resurrection and Titanic.

A graduate of UCLA Film School, Warner started out as a production coordinator at Empire Pictures, gaining experience on low-budget horror and science-fiction films. He then moved on to a position at Film Finances, a completion bond company, where he worked on more than 50 films.

Warner began his career as a producer on the horror hit Freddy's Dead: The Final Nightmare. He then served as supervising producer on John Dahl's Red Rock West, before beginning his relationship with Twentieth Century Fox as the line producer on Rachel Talalay's Ghost in the Machine. He later executive produced Tank Girl, also directed by Talalay. In addition, he oversaw production on James Cameron's film True Lies.

He executive produced Shrek Forever After, along with Andrew Adamson and John H. Williams.

== Filmography ==
=== Film ===
Year	Title	Role	Notes
1984	Choose Me		production assistant
1985	Ghoulies		production coordinator
1985	Trancers		production coordinator production manager
1988	Hairspray		production supervisor
1989	Powwow Highway		production manager
1989	Twister		production manager
1990	Wild at Heart		completion bond
1990	Men of Respect		completion bond
1991	Highlander II: The Quickening		production manager
1991	Freddy's Dead: The Final Nightmare		producer
1993	Red Rock West		supervising producer
1993	Suture		special thanks
1993	Ghost in the Machine		line producer
1994	True Lies		production executive
1995	Tank Girl		executive producer
1996	Independence Day		production executive
1996	The Crucible		production executive
1997	The Ice Storm		production executive
1997	Alien Resurrection		production executive
1998	Antz		producer
2001	The Deep End		special thanks
2001	Shrek	Big Bad Wolf	producer
2001	A.I.: Artificial Intelligence		visual effects studio head
2002	Minority Report		visual effects studio head
2004	Shrek 2	Big Bad Wolf	producer writer: Fairy Godmother Song
2007	Shrek the Third	Big Bad Wolf	producer writer
2010	Shrek Forever After	Big Bad Wolf	executive producer
2011	Puss in Boots		special thanks
2012	Cirque du Soleil: Worlds Away		producer
2013	Free Birds		executive producer
2014	The Book of Life	Thomas	executive producer
2019	The Angry Birds Movie 2		executive producer
2021	Wish Dragon		producer
2027	Charlie vs. the Chocolate Factory		producer

=== Television ===
Year	Title	Role	Notes
2007	Shrek the Halls	Big Bad Wolf	executive producer
2010	Scared Shrekless	Big Bad Wolf	special thanks
