= Robert Zemeckis =

American filmmaker (born 1951)

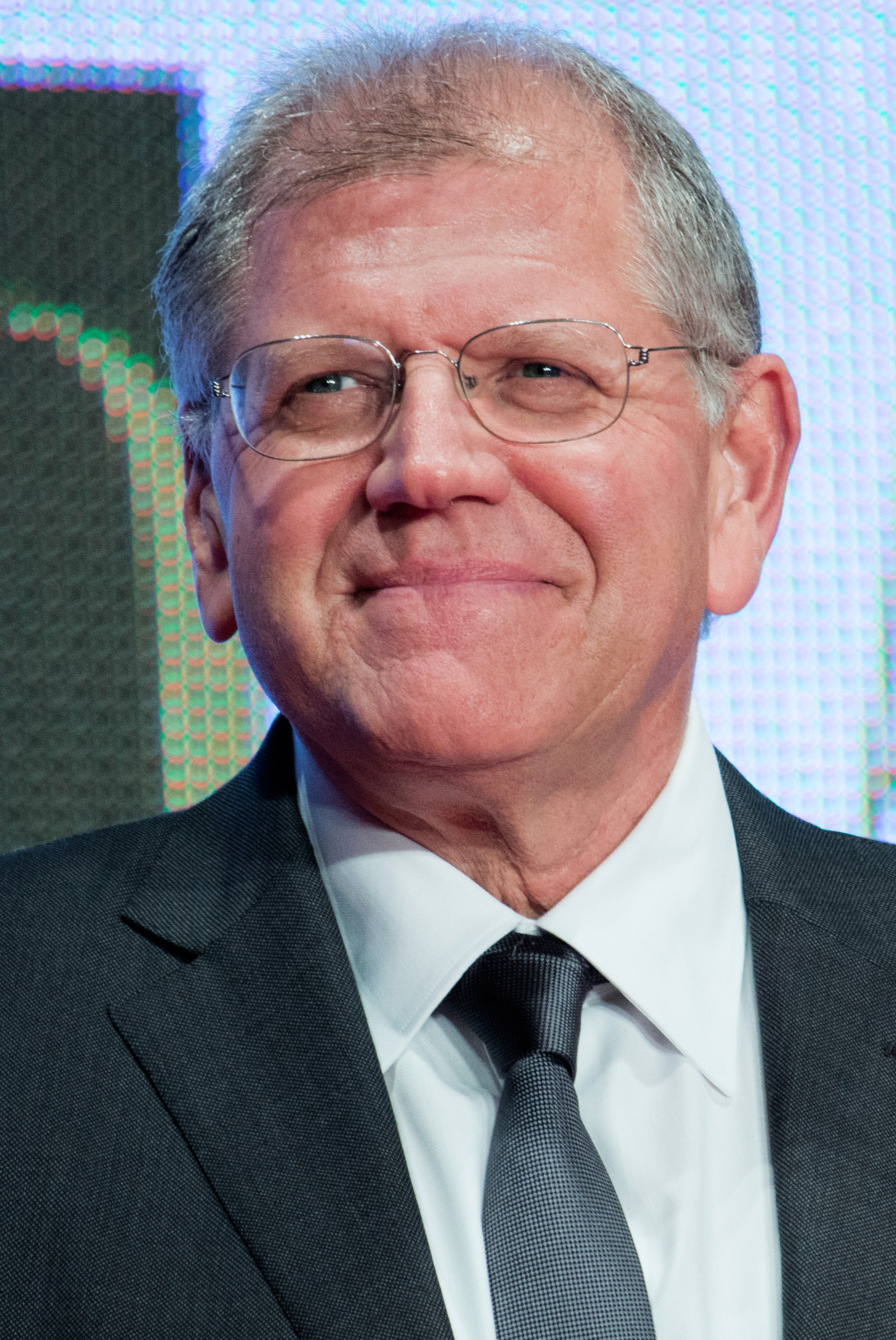
- Zemeckis in 2015
- Born: May 14, 1951 (age 75); Chicago, Illinois, United States
- Other name: Bob Zemeckis
- Occupations: Director; producer; screenwriter
- Years active: 1972–present
- Political party: Democratic
- Spouses: Mary Ellen Trainor (m. 1980; div. 2000); Leslie Harter (m. 2001)
- Children: 4

Robert Lee Zemeckis (born May 14, 1951), sometimes called Bob Zemeckis, is an American filmmaker. Known for directing and producing a range of successful and influential films that often blend cutting-edge visual effects with storytelling in the late 20th century, he has received accolades such as an Academy Award and a Golden Globe Award, as well as nominations for five British Academy Film Awards and a Daytime Emmy Award.

Zemeckis gained some recognition for his short film A Field of Honor (1973), which earned him a Student Academy Award for Special Jury Prize at USC. He started his career directing the comedy films I Wanna Hold Your Hand (1978), Used Cars (1980), and Romancing the Stone (1984). He gained prominence directing the sci-fi comedy Back to the Future trilogy (1985–1990), the fantasy comedy Who Framed Roger Rabbit (1988), and the comedy-drama Forrest Gump (1994), the latter of which earned him the Academy Award for Best Director. He is one of only a few people to win Academy Awards for both student and professional work.

Zemeckis has also directed the satirical black comedy Death Becomes Her (1992), the science fiction film Contact (1997), and the drama films Cast Away (2000), Flight (2012), The Walk (2015), and Allied (2016). His exploration of motion-capture techniques is seen in the animated films The Polar Express (2004) and A Christmas Carol (2009), as well as the action fantasy Beowulf (2007) and the drama Welcome to Marwen (2018). He has collaborated with film composer Alan Silvestri since 1984, and directed Tom Hanks in five films.

== Early life ==
Robert Lee Zemeckis was born in Chicago on May 14, 1951, the son of Italian-American mother Rosa (née Nespeca) and Lithuanian-American father Alphonse Zemeckis. He grew up in a working-class family on Chicago's South Side, where he attended a Catholic grade school and Fenger Academy High School. He said of his childhood, "The truth was that in my family there was no art. I mean, there was no music, there were no books, there was no theater ... the only thing I had that was inspirational was television."

As a child, Zemeckis loved television and was fascinated by his parents' 8 mm film home movie camera. Starting off by filming family events like birthdays and holidays, he gradually began producing narrative films with his friends that incorporated stop-motion work and other visual effects. He remained an avid television viewer, about which he later said, "You hear so much about the problems with television but I think that it saved my life." Television gave him his first glimpse of a world outside of his upbringing, specifically after he learned that film schools existed from an episode of The Tonight Show Starring Johnny Carson.

After seeing Bonnie and Clyde with his father, he decided that he wanted to go to film school. His parents disapproved of the idea. He later clarified that they disapproved "only in the sense that they were concerned" because "this was the kind of dream that really was impossible" for family and my friends in the world he grew up in. He said, "My parents would sit there and say, 'Don't you see where you come from? You can't be a movie director.' I guess maybe some of it I felt I had to do in spite of them, too."

Zemeckis first attended Northern Illinois University (NIU) in DeKalb, Illinois, and gained early experience in film as a film cutter for NBC News in Chicago during a summer break. He also edited commercials in his home state. He applied to transfer from NIU to the University of Southern California's (USC) School of Cinematic Arts in Los Angeles, where he went into the Film School on the strength of an essay and a music video based on The Beatles song. After waiting to hear back from the university, he called them directly and was told he had been rejected because of his average grades. He gave an "impassioned plea" to the university official during the phone call, promising to go to summer school and improve his studies, and eventually convinced the school to accept him.

Arriving at USC that fall, Zemeckis encountered a program that he later described as being "made up of a bunch of hippies [and] considered an embarrassment by the university". The classes were difficult, with professors constantly stressing how hard the film industry was. Zemeckis remembered not being much fazed by this, citing the "healthy cynicism" that had been bred into him from his Chicago upbringing. He met a fellow student, writer Bob Gale, who later recalled, "The graduate students at USC had this veneer of intellectualism ... so Bob and I gravitated toward one another because we wanted to make Hollywood movies. We weren't interested in the French New Wave. We were interested in Clint Eastwood and James Bond and Walt Disney, because that's how we grew up." Zemeckis graduated from USC in 1973, and he and Gale co-wrote the unproduced screenplays Tank and Bordello of Blood, which they pitched to John Milius, the latter of which was later developed into a film that was released in 1996.

== Career ==
=== 1978–1984: Early comedy films ===
As a result of winning a Student Academy Award at USC for his film A Field of Honor, Zemeckis came to the attention of Steven Spielberg. Spielberg said, "He barged right past my secretary and sat me down and showed me this student film ... and I thought it was spectacular, with police cars and a riot, all dubbed to Elmer Bernstein's score for The Great Escape." Spielberg became Zemeckis's mentor and executive produced his first two films, both of which Gale and Zemeckis co-wrote.

Spielberg produced I Wanna Hold Your Hand (1978, starring Nancy Allen) and Used Cars (1980, starring Kurt Russell); both were critical, but not commercial, successes. I Wanna Hold Your Hand was the first of several Zemeckis films to incorporate historic figures and celebrities into his movies; he used archival footage and doubles to simulate the presence of the Beatles. After the failure of his first two films, and the Spielberg-directed 1941 (1979) (written by Gale and Zemeckis), the pair gained a reputation for writing "scripts that everyone thought were great [but] somehow didn't translate into movies people wanted to see."

As a result of his reputation within the industry, Zemeckis had trouble finding work in the early 1980s, though he and Gale kept busy. They wrote scripts for other directors, including Car Pool for Brian De Palma and Growing Up for Spielberg; neither ended up getting made. Another Zemeckis–Gale project, Back to the Future, about a teenager who travels back in time to the 1950s, was turned down by every major studio. The director was jobless until Michael Douglas hired him in 1984 to direct Romancing the Stone. A romantic adventure starring Douglas and Kathleen Turner, Stone was expected to flop (to the point that, after viewing a rough cut of the film, the producers of the then-in-the-works Cocoon fired Zemeckis as director), but the film became a sleeper hit. While working on Romancing the Stone, Zemeckis met composer Alan Silvestri, who has scored all his subsequent pictures.

=== 1985–1999: Breakthrough and acclaim ===
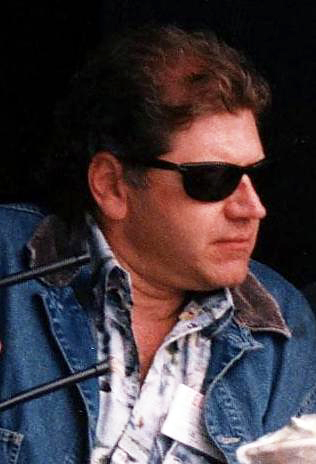
Zemeckis while directing Contact (1997) in 1997

After Romancing the Stone, Zemeckis had the clout to direct his time-traveling screenplay "Back to the Future". Starring Michael J. Fox, Lea Thompson, Crispin Glover, and Christopher Lloyd, the 1985 film was wildly successful upon its release and was followed by two sequels, released as Back to the Future Part II in 1989 and Back to the Future Part III in 1990. Before the Back to the Future sequels were released, Zemeckis collaborated with Disney and directed another film, the madcap 1940s-set mystery Who Framed Roger Rabbit, which combined live-action and traditional animation; its $70 million budget made it one of the most expensive films made up to that point. The film was both a financial and critical success and won three Academy Awards. In 1990, Zemeckis commented, when asked if he would want to make non-comedies, "I would like to be able to do everything. Just now, though, I'm too restless to do anything that's not really zany."

In 1992, Zemeckis directed the black comedy Death Becomes Her, starring Meryl Streep, Goldie Hawn, and Bruce Willis. Although his next film would have some comedic elements, it was Zemeckis's first with dramatic elements and was also his biggest commercial success to date, Forrest Gump. Starring Tom Hanks in the title role, Forrest Gump tells the story of a man with a low I.Q., who unwittingly participates in some of the major events of the twentieth century, falls in love, and interacts with several major historical figures in the process. The film grossed $677 million worldwide and became the top-grossing American film of 1994; it won six Academy Awards, including Best Picture, Best Actor for Hanks, and Best Director for Zemeckis.

From this point, Hanks and Zemeckis became frequent collaborators. In 1997, Zemeckis directed Contact, a long-gestating project based on Carl Sagan's 1985 novel of the same name. The film centers on Eleanor Arroway (Jodie Foster), who believes she has made contact with extraterrestrials. In the early 1990s, he founded South Side Amusement Company, which later became ImageMovers.

During this same time period, Zemeckis was an executive producer of HBO's Tales from the Crypt (1989–1996) and directed three episodes. In 1999, Zemeckis donated $5 million towards the Robert Zemeckis Center for Digital Arts at USC, a 35,000-square-foot (3,300 m^{2}) center. When the Center opened in March 2001, Zemeckis spoke in a panel about the future of film, alongside friends Steven Spielberg and George Lucas. Of those (including Spielberg) who clung to celluloid and disparaged the idea of shooting digitally, Zemeckis said, "These guys are the same ones who have been saying that LPs sound better than CDs. You can argue that until you're blue in the face, but I don't know anyone who's still buying vinyl. The film, as we have traditionally thought of it, is going to be different. But the continuum is man's desire to tell stories around the campfire. The only thing that keeps changing is the campfire." The Robert Zemeckis Center currently hosts many film school classes, much of the Interactive Media Division, and Trojan Vision, USC's student television station, which has been voted the number one college television station in the country.

In 1996, Zemeckis had begun developing a project titled The Castaway with Tom Hanks and writer William Broyles Jr. The story, inspired by Robinson Crusoe, is about a man who becomes stranded on a tropical island and undergoes a profound physical and spiritual change. While working on The Castaway, Zemeckis also became attached to a Hitchcockian thriller titled What Lies Beneath, the story of a married couple experiencing an extreme case of empty nest syndrome that was based on an idea by Steven Spielberg. Because Hanks's character needed to undergo a dramatic weight loss over the course of The Castaway (retitled Cast Away for release), Zemeckis decided that the only way to retain the same crew while Hanks lost the weight was to shoot What Lies Beneath in between. He shot the first part of Cast Away in early 1999, and shot What Lies Beneath in fall 1999, completing work on the former in early 2000.

Zemeckis later quipped, when asked about shooting two films back-to-back, "I wouldn't recommend it to anyone." What Lies Beneath, starring Harrison Ford and Michelle Pfeiffer, was released in July 2000 to mixed reviews, but did well at the box office, grossing over $155 million domestically. Cast Away, starring Hanks and Twister actress Helen Hunt, was released that December and grossed $233 million domestically; Hanks received a nomination for the Academy Award for Best Actor for his portrayal of Chuck Noland.

=== 2004–present: Career fluctuations ===
In 2004, Zemeckis re-collaborated with Hanks for The Polar Express, based on Chris Van Allsburg's children's book of the same name. The Polar Express used the computer animation technique known as motion capture, where the movements of the actors are captured digitally and used as the basis for the animated characters. As the first film to use motion capture, The Polar Express caused The New York Times to write that, "Whatever critics and audiences make of this movie, from a technical perspective it could mark a turning point in the gradual transition from an analog to a digital cinema." Zemeckis served as an executive producer for Monster House (2006), a family-friendly horror comedy film that used motion capture.

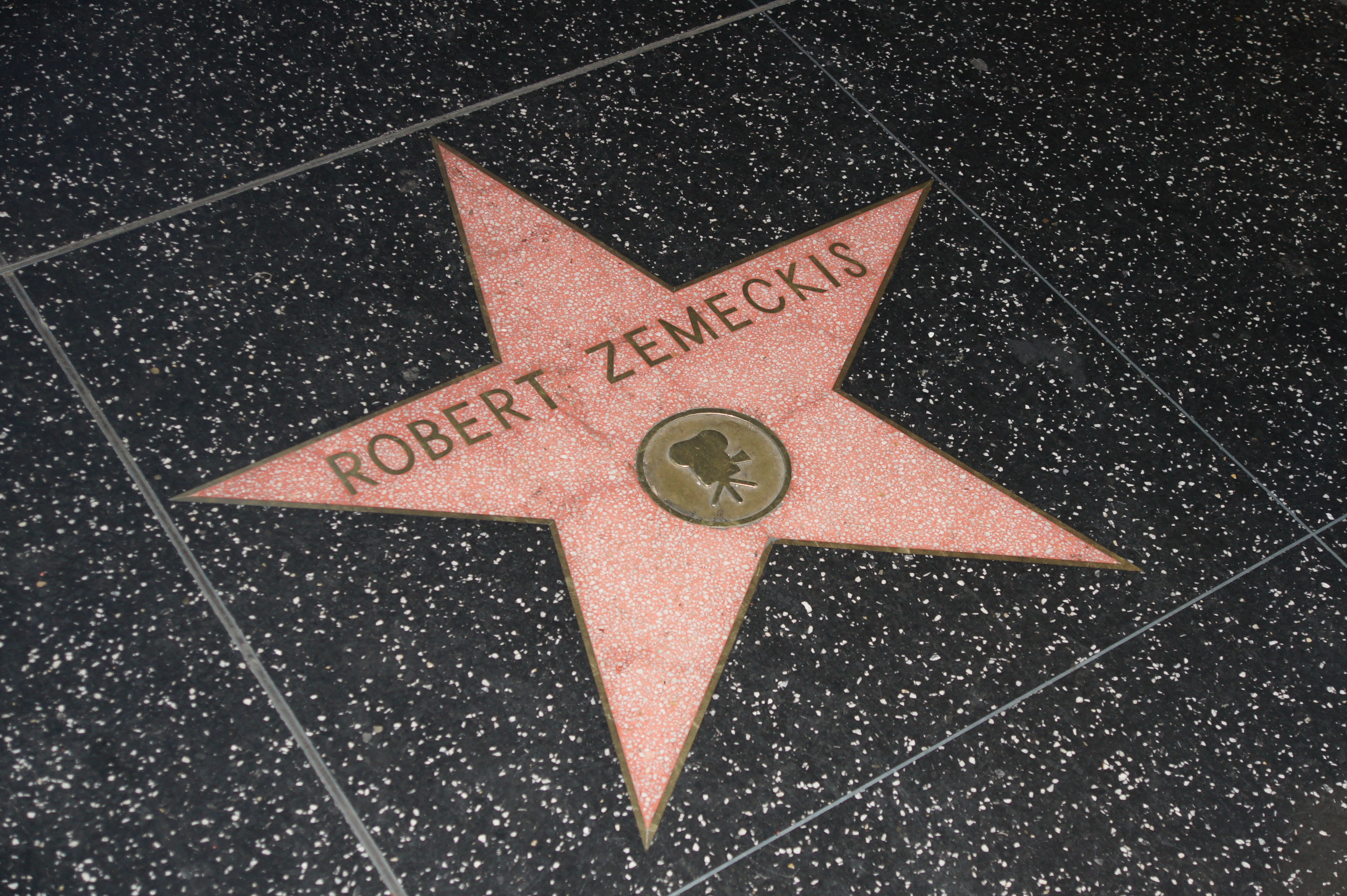
Zemeckis's star on Walk of Fame, Hollywood, LA

In February 2007, Zemeckis and Walt Disney Studios chairman Dick Cook announced plans for a new motion capture film company devoted to CGI-created 3D movies. The company, ImageMovers Digital, created films using the motion capture technology, with Zemeckis directing most of the projects which Disney distributed and marketed worldwide. Zemeckis used the motion capture technology again in his film, Beowulf, to retell the Anglo-Saxon epic poem of the same name. It featured Ray Winstone, Angelina Jolie, and Anthony Hopkins. Neil Gaiman, who co-wrote the adaptation with Roger Avary, described the film as a "cheerfully violent and strange take on the Beowulf legend."

The film was released on November 16, 2007, to mostly positive reviews and grossed $196 million worldwide. In July 2007, Variety announced that Zemeckis had written a screenplay for A Christmas Carol, based on Charles Dickens's 1843 short story of the same name, with plans to use motion capture and release it under the aegis of ImageMovers Digital. Zemeckis wrote the script with Jim Carrey in mind, and Carrey agreed to play a multitude of roles in the film, including Ebenezer Scrooge as a young, middle-aged, and old man, and the three ghosts who haunt Scrooge.

The film began production in February 2008 and was released on November 6, 2009, to mixed reviews and grossed $325 million at the box office. Actor Gary Oldman also appeared in the film. Zemeckis is an avid supporter of 3D digital cinema and has stated that since the 3D presentations of Beowulf, all of his future films would be done in 3D using digital motion capture. He has reportedly backed away from that statement and said that the decision to use 3D will be on a film-by-film basis.

On August 19, 2009, it was reported that Zemeckis and his company were in talks with Apple Corps Ltd. to remake the animated film Yellow Submarine using motion capture. However, on March 12, 2010, with Zemeckis's biggest Disney ally, former chairman Dick Cook, gone, and amid drastic cost-cutting by the new management team, Disney announced that it was ending its relationship with ImageMovers Digital. The studio's final film, 2011's Zemeckis-produced Mars Needs Moms, was the second-worst box office failure in history, with a net loss of roughly $130 million. Zemeckis made his comeback to live-action filmmaking with Flight, a 2012 drama for Paramount, starring Denzel Washington. On January 31, 2014, it was announced that a stage musical adaptation of Zemeckis's first Back to the Future film was in production. The show would be co-written by original writers Robert Zemeckis and Bob Gale. According to Gale, the musical would be "true to the spirit of the film without being a slavish remake".

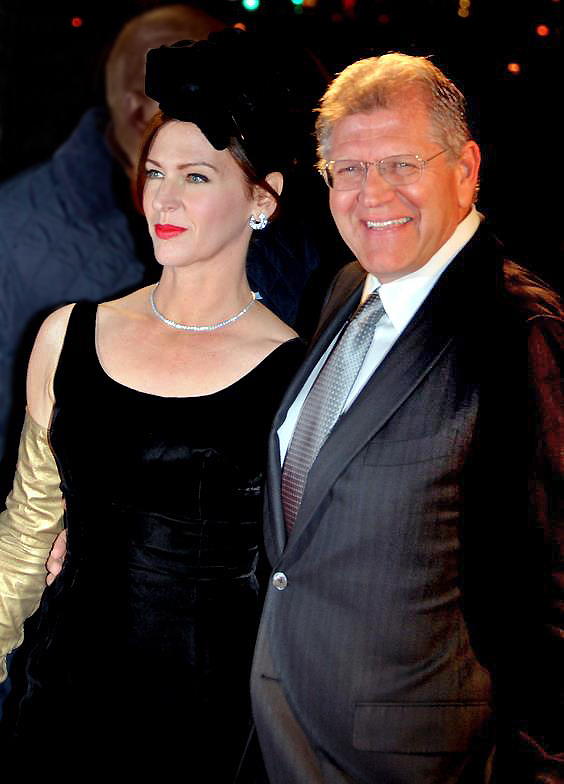
Zemeckis with his wife Leslie in January 2013

In August 2008, IGN revealed in an interview with Philippe Petit that Zemeckis was working with Petit to turn Petit's memoir To Reach the Clouds into a feature film. In 2015, he directed The Walk, about Philippe Petit (Joseph Gordon-Levitt) and his ambition to tightrope walk between the towers of New York City's World Trade Center. Paramount Pictures and New Regency announced in February 2015 that Zemeckis would direct Brad Pitt in Allied, a romantic thriller set during World War II. The film was released on November 23, 2016. Next, Zemeckis directed the fantasy drama Welcome to Marwen, starring Steve Carell, which was released in December 2018 to mixed reviews and flopped at the box office. Zemeckis's film The Witches, an adaptation of the Roald Dahl novel of the same name, premiered on October 22, 2020, on HBO Max, also to mixed reviews.

In October 2019, it was announced that Zemeckis was in talks to direct Disney's live-action adaptation of Pinocchio. Zemeckis was officially announced as the film's director and co-writer of the script in January 2020. Tom Hanks was reportedly announced as playing Geppetto in the film, marking the fourth collaboration with Hanks since Forrest Gump, Cast Away, and The Polar Express. The film was later released, as part of Disney+ Day on Disney+, on September 8, 2022, to highly negative reviews from critics. Pinocchio was nominated for six Razzies, including Worst Picture and Worst Director for Zemeckis ("winning" Worst Remake), losing to Blonde. Despite this, it received a Visual Effects Society Award nomination for Outstanding Animated Character in a Photoreal Feature.

On February 17, 2022, Zemeckis signed on to direct Here, an adaptation of the graphic novel by Richard McGuire, with Tom Hanks set to star and Forrest Gump screenwriter Eric Roth working on the screenplay with Zemeckis. On May 11, it was announced that Robin Wright had been cast and that TriStar Pictures had acquired distribution rights for the United States, with Miramax handling international sales and production expected to begin in September 2022 for a theatrical release in 2024. On October 31, 2024, Zemeckis, during an appearance on Josh Horowitz's Happy Sad Confused podcast to promote Here, hinted at his plans to produce and direct a film adaptation of the stage musical version of Back to the Future that would also serve as a remake of the original film. Universal has yet to green-light the project after an initial rejection of Zemeckis's pitch to the studio.

On April 17, 2025, it was announced Zemeckis would direct the thriller The Last Mrs. Parrish, based on the 2017 novel, for Netflix, with Jennifer Lopez set to produce and star in the project. Production was underway by September in New York City, with Nikolaj Coster-Waldau, Isabel May, Pierson Fodé, Debi Mazar, and Denis O'Hare joining the cast.

== Style and recognition ==
Zemeckis is regarded as an innovator in visual effects. His exploration of state-of-the-art visual effects includes the early use of computer graphics inserted into live-action footage in Back to the Future Part II (1989) and Forrest Gump, the insertion of hand-drawn animation into live-action footage in Who Framed Roger Rabbit, and the motion capture techniques seen in The Polar Express (2004), Beowulf (2007), A Christmas Carol (2009), and Welcome to Marwen (2018).

He is known for his collaboration with composer Alan Silvestri, with whom he has worked since Romancing the Stone. David Thomson, a prominent film critic, wrote that "no other contemporary director has used visual effects to more dramatic and narrative purpose."

== Personal life ==
Zemeckis was married to actress Mary Ellen Trainor from 1980 until their divorce in 2000. They had a son together named Alexander Francis. He described the marriage as difficult to balance with his career. In 2001, he married actress Leslie Harter in Venice. They have three children together. They reside in Santa Barbara, California, and own a villa in Tuscany which is located on the ruins of a 10th-century castle.

Zemeckis has discussed sacrificing his personal life for his career over a long period of time, stating in 1996, "I won an Academy Award when I was 42 years old, but I paid for it with my 20s. That decade of my life from film school 'til 30 was nothing but work, nothing but absolute, driving work. I had no money. I had no life."

Zemeckis is a private pilot who has logged approximately 1,600 hours of flight time as of October 2012, flying a Cirrus SR22.

According to campaign donation records, Zemeckis has frequently contributed to Democratic politicians and PACs that support the interests of aircraft owners and pilots, family planning, and a group that advocates for women in Hollywood.

== Filmography ==
=== Feature film ===
Year	Title	Director	Writer	Producer
1978	I Wanna Hold Your Hand	Yes	Yes	No
1979	1941	No	Yes	No
1980	Used Cars	Yes	Yes	No
1984	Romancing the Stone	Yes	No	No
1985	Back to the Future	Yes	Yes	No
1988	Who Framed Roger Rabbit	Yes	No	No
1989	Back to the Future Part II	Yes	Story	No
1990	Back to the Future Part III	Yes	Story	No
1992	Death Becomes Her	Yes	No	Yes
1992	Trespass	No	Yes	Executive
1994	Forrest Gump	Yes	No	No
1996	Tales from the Crypt: Bordello of Blood	No	Story	Executive
1997	Contact	Yes	No	Yes
2000	What Lies Beneath	Yes	No	Yes
2000	Cast Away	Yes	No	Yes
2004	The Polar Express	Yes	Yes	Yes
2007	Beowulf	Yes	No	Yes
2009	A Christmas Carol	Yes	Yes	Yes
2012	Flight	Yes	No	Yes
2015	The Walk	Yes	Yes	Yes
2016	Allied	Yes	No	Yes
2018	Welcome to Marwen	Yes	Yes	Yes
2020	The Witches	Yes	Yes	Yes
2022	Pinocchio	Yes	Yes	Yes
2024	Here	Yes	Yes	Yes
TBA	The Last Mrs. Parrish	Yes	No	No

Short film

Year	Title	Director	Writer
1972	The Lift	Yes	Yes
1973	A Field of Honor	Yes	Yes

Producer

- Tales from the Crypt: Demon Knight (1995)
- House on Haunted Hill (1999)
- Thirteen Ghosts (2001)
- Ghost Ship (2002)
- Gothika (2003)
- House of Wax (2005)
- The Prize Winner of Defiance, Ohio (2005)
- The Reaping (2007)
- Mars Needs Moms (2011)

Executive producer

- The Public Eye (1992)
- The Frighteners (1996)
- Matchstick Men (2003)
- Last Holiday (2006)
- Monster House (2006)
- Behind the Burly Q (2010)
- Real Steel (2011)
- Bound by Flesh (2012) (documentary)
- Finch (2021)
- Barracuda (TBA)

Executive soundtrack producer

- Forrest Gump (1994)

=== Television ===
Year	Title	Director	Executive producer	Writer	Creator	Notes
1975	Kolchak: The Night Stalker	No	No	Story	No	Episode: "Chopper"
1984	Used Cars	Yes	Yes	No	Yes	Unsold pilot
1986	Amazing Stories	Yes	No	No	No	Episode: "Go to the Head of the Class"
1989–1996	Tales from the Crypt	Yes	Yes	No	No	Director: "And All Through the House", "Yellow", and "You, Murderer"
1991–1992	Back to the Future: The Animated Series	No	No	No	Yes	
1993	Johnny Bago	Yes	Yes	Story	Yes	Episode: "Johnny Bago Free at Last"
1999	The Pursuit of Happiness: Smoking, Drinking and Drugging in the 20th Century	Yes	No	No	No	Television documentary
2018	Medal of Honor	No	Yes	No	No	Television documentary
2018–2023	Manifest	No	Yes	No	No	
2019–2020	Project Blue Book	No	Yes	No	No	
2019	What/If	No	Yes	No	No	

== Awards and nominations ==
Organizations	Year	Category	Project	Result
Academy Award	1985	Best Original Screenplay	Back to the Future	Nominated
Academy Award	1994	Best Director	Forrest Gump	Won
BAFTA Awards	1985	Best Film	Back to the Future	Nominated
BAFTA Awards	1985	Best Original Screenplay	Back to the Future	Nominated
BAFTA Awards	1994	Best Film	Forrest Gump	Nominated
BAFTA Awards	1994	Best Direction	Forrest Gump	Nominated
BAFTA Awards	2004	Best Feature Film	The Polar Express	Nominated
César Award	1988	Best Foreign Film	Who Framed Roger Rabbit	Nominated
Chicago Film Critics Association	1985	Best Director	Who Framed Roger Rabbit	Won
Chicago Film Critics Association	1994	Best Director	Forrest Gump	Nominated
Chicago Film Critics Association	2000	Best Director	Cast Away	Nominated
Daytime Emmy Award	1997	Outstanding Game Show	Secrets of the Cryptkeeper's Haunted House	Nominated
Directors Guild of America	1989	Outstanding Directing - Feature Film	Who Framed Roger Rabbit	Nominated
Directors Guild of America	1994	Outstanding Directing - Feature Film	Forrest Gump	Won
Golden Globe Awards	1985	Best Screenplay	Back to the Future	Nominated
Golden Globe Awards	1994	Best Director	Forrest Gump	Won
Golden Raspberry Awards	2023	Worst Picture	Disney's Pinocchio	Nominated
Golden Raspberry Awards	2023	Worst Director	Disney's Pinocchio	Nominated
Golden Raspberry Awards	2023	Worst Screenplay	Disney's Pinocchio	Nominated
Las Vegas Film Critics Society	2000	Best Director	Cast Away	Nominated
Student Academy Award	1973	Special Jury Prize - Dramatic	A Field of Honor	Won
Venice International Film Festival	1985	Young Venice Award	Back to the Future	Nominated
Venice International Film Festival	1988	Special Mention	Who Framed Roger Rabbit	Nominated
Writers Guild of America	1985	Best Original Screenplay	Back to the Future	Nominated

- In 1996, Zemeckis received the Golden Plate Award of the American Academy of Achievement presented by Awards Council member George Lucas.
- In 1998, Zemeckis received the Los Angeles Film Critics Association's Special Achievement Award.
- On November 5, 2004, Zemeckis received a star on the Hollywood Walk of Fame for his work in Motion Picture at 6925 Hollywood Blvd.

Accolades received by individual films

Year	Title	Academy Awards		BAFTA Awards		Golden Globe Awards	
Year	Title	Nominations	Wins	Nominations	Wins	Nominations	Wins
1984	Romancing the Stone	1				2	2
1985	Back to the Future	4	1	5		4	
1988	Who Framed Roger Rabbit	7	3	5	1	2	
1989	Back to the Future Part II	1		1	1		
1992	Death Becomes Her	1	1	1	1	1	
1994	Forrest Gump	13	6	8	1	7	3
1997	Contact	1				1	
2000	Cast Away	2		1		1	1
2004	The Polar Express	3				1	
2012	Flight	2				1	
2016	Allied	1		1			
Total		36	11	22	4	20	6

Directed Academy Award performances
Under Zemeckis's direction, these actors have received Academy Award nominations (and one win) for their performances in their respective roles.

Year	Performer	Film	Result
Academy Award for Best Actor
1994	Tom Hanks	Forrest Gump	Won
2000	Tom Hanks	Cast Away	Nominated
2012	Denzel Washington	Flight	Nominated
Academy Award for Best Supporting Actor
1994	Gary Sinise	Forrest Gump	Nominated

== See also ==
- Directors with two films rated "A+" by CinemaScore
- Robert Zemeckis's unproduced projects
