= Speedboat (novel) =

1976 novel by Renata Adler

- First edition
- Author: Renata Adler
- Language: English
- Publisher: Random House
- Publication date: 1976
- Publication place: United States
- Media type: Print
- Pages: 178 pp
- ISBN: 0-394-48876-8

Speedboat is a 1976 modernist novel by Renata Adler that offers a fragmentary account of the experiences of Jen Fain, a young journalist living in New York City.

== Publication history ==
Prior to Speedboat, Adler was largely known for her nonfiction reportage in The New Yorker, and while Speedboat is billed as a novel it includes actual incidents and autobiographical elements; as Adler once remarked, "Some of it was real." When the book was published in 1976, the 39-year-old Adler had temporarily left writing to become a first-year student at Yale Law School. "I guess I didn’t know what was going to happen when Speedboat came out", she later said. "I thought, I better be in law school, because who knows whether anyone will like it or not." Speedboat received critical acclaim and won the Hemingway Foundation/PEN Award for best debut work by an American writer of fiction. The prize was judged by E. L. Doctorow, Elizabeth Hardwick, and Susan Sontag. The novel was also a finalist for the 1976 National Book Critics Circle Award.

The novel fell out of print in 1988 but remained a cult favorite; while teaching at Pomona College, David Foster Wallace included Speedboat on the syllabus for a course on "obscure/eclectic fictions", and in 2000 David Shields declared it "one of the most original and formally exciting American novels published in the past 25 years."

In 2013, Speedboat was reissued by New York Review Books simultaneously with Adler's second novel, Pitch Dark; both works enjoyed a renewed wave of attention. The Chicago Tribune referred to Speedboat as a "perfect novel", and Anna Wiener wrote in The New Republic that, "Out of the blue, it seemed like everyone I knew was reading and discussing Adler. ... New York City booksellers pushed [Speedboat] as a recovered sacred text [and] Adler earned a new coterie of readers." Writers Ezra Furman, Rachel Khong, Jenny Offill, and Kate Zambreno have subsequently cited Speedboat as an influence. In 2015, Joan Didion, to whom Adler has sometimes been compared, included Speedboat in her list of all-time favorite books.
