= Jenny Offill =

American writer and editor

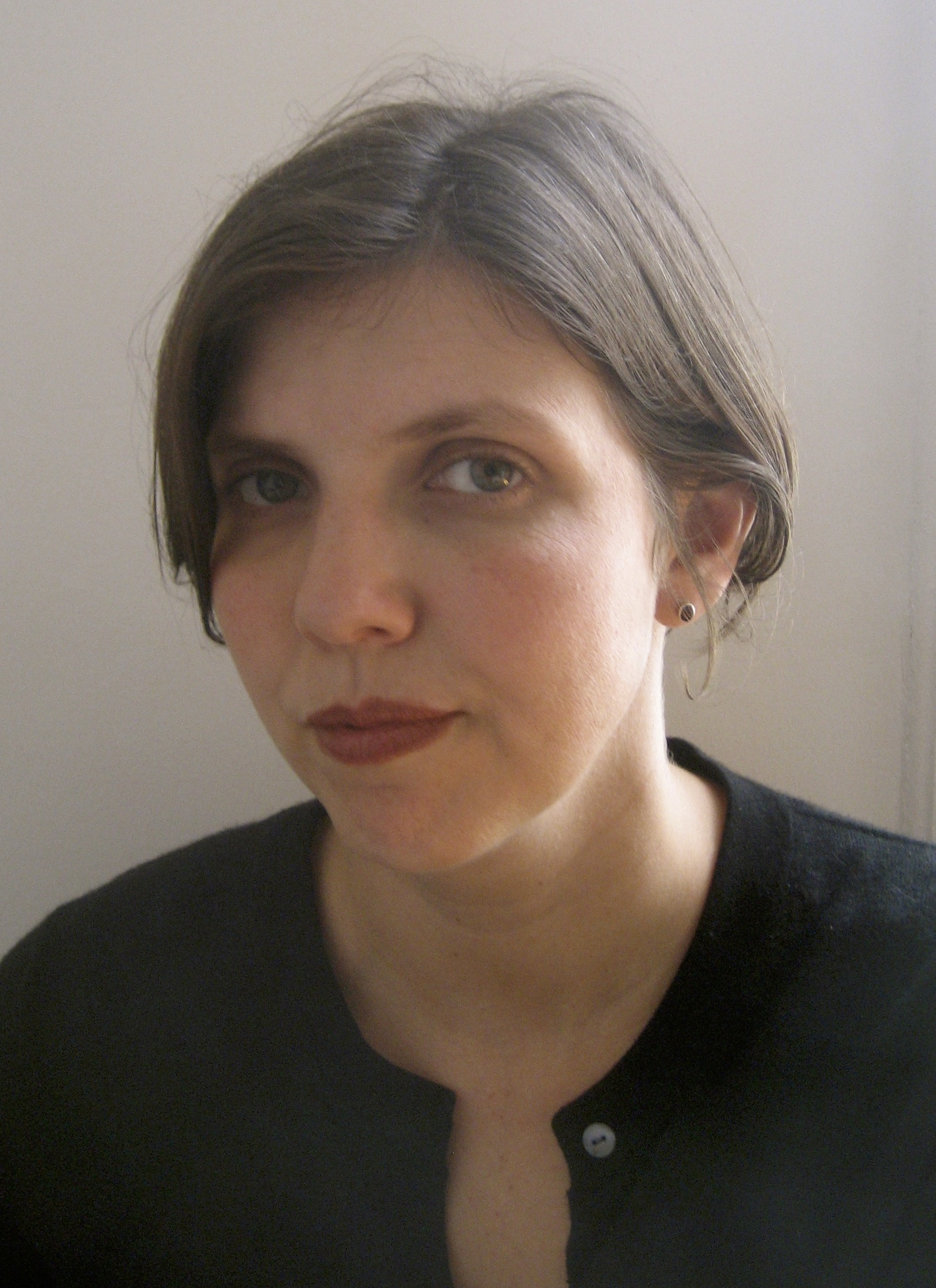
- Offill in 2007
- Born: November 14, 1968 (age 57); Massachusetts, U.S.
- Education: University of North Carolina at Chapel Hill (BA)
- Writing career
- Genres: Novelist, children's writer, editor
- Website: jennyoffill.com

Jenny Offill (born November 14, 1968) is an American novelist and editor. Her novel Dept. of Speculation was named one of "The 10 Best Books of 2014" by The New York Times Book Review.

External videos
- Folio Prize Fiction Festival; Manuscripts Reading Room, British Library, Sunday 22 March 2015
- Jenny Offill reads from: Dept of Speculation, British Library via YouTube

== Early life ==
Jenny Offill is the only child of two private-school English teachers. She spent her childhood years in various American states, including Massachusetts, California, Indiana, and North Carolina, where she attended high school and received a BA degree from the University of North Carolina at Chapel Hill, and later, at Stanford University, was a Stegner Fellow in Fiction. After graduating, she worked a number of odd jobs: waitress, bartender, caterer, cashier, medical transcriber, fact-checker, and ghost-writer.

"I went to UNC-Chapel Hill as an undergraduate and I studied with Doris Betts, Jill McCorkle and Robert Kirkpatrick among others. All three were great mentors to me as a young writer. Later, I got a Stegner Fellowship at Stanford. My big influence there was Gilbert Sorrentino..."
—Jenny Offill, to Ellen Birkett Morris

== Career ==
=== Writing ===
Offill's first novel, Last Things, was published in 1999 by Farrar, Straus and Giroux and in the UK by Bloomsbury. It was a New York Times Notable book and a finalist for the L.A Times First Book Award. Offill's second novel, Dept. of Speculation, was published in January 2014 and was named one of the 10 Best Books of 2014 by the New York Times Book Review. Dept. of Speculation has been shortlisted for the Folio Prize in the UK, the Pen/Faulkner Award and the L.A. Times Fiction Award. In 2016 Offill was awarded a Guggenheim Fellowship.

Her work has appeared in the Paris Review. She is also the co-editor with Elissa Schappell of two anthologies of essays and the author of several children's books. Offill's short fiction has appeared in Electric Literature and Significant Objects.

"I have always liked compressed and fragmentary forms. I trace it back to my mind being blown by John Berryman when I was nineteen."
—Jenny Offill, about Dept. of Speculation

Her third novel, Weather, was shortlisted for the 2020 Women's Prize for Fiction, and in December 2020, Emily Temple of Literary Hub reported that the novel had made 13 lists of the best books of 2020.

=== Teaching ===
Offill has taught in the MFA programs at Brooklyn College, Syracuse University, Columbia University and Queens University of Charlotte. She served as Visiting Writer at Syracuse University and Sarah Lawrence College, and as Writer-in-Residence at Vassar College and Pratt University. She is currently the Writer-in-Residence at Bard College in Annandale-on-Hudson, NY.

== Personal life ==
As of 2008, Offill worked as a creative writing teacher at Brooklyn College and Columbia University. She has a child, Theo, with her partner, David Hirme. Offill lives in the Hudson Valley.

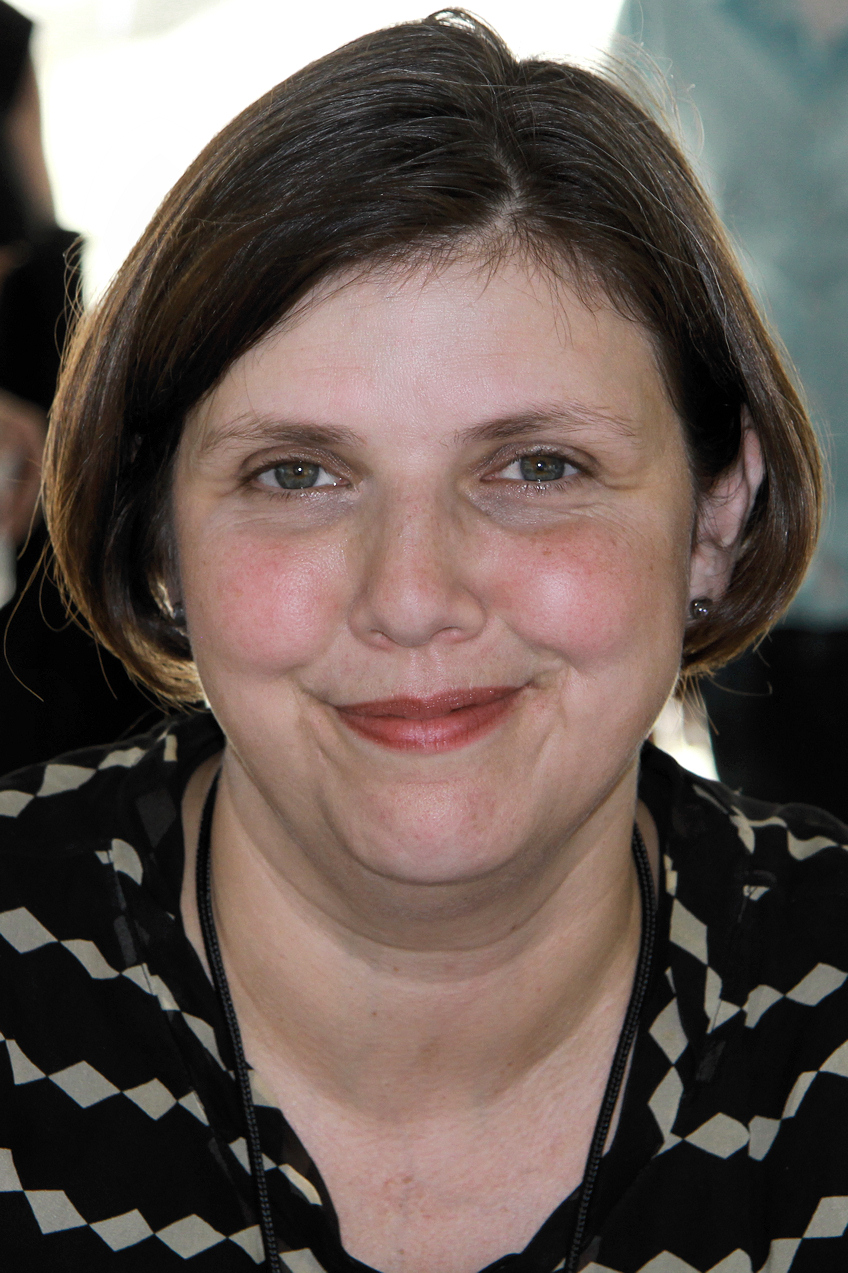
Jenny Offill, Texas Book Festival, Austin Texas, 25 October 2014, 15:26

== Works ==
=== Novels ===
- Last Things. Bloomsbury, 2000. ISBN 9780747551478
- Dept. of Speculation. Knopf Doubleday. 2014. ISBN 978-0-385-35102-7.
- Weather. Knopf. 2020. ISBN 978-0-385-35110-2.

=== Children's books ===
- 17 Things I'm Not Allowed to Do Anymore. Illustrated by Nancy Carpenter. Random House Children's Books. 2010. ISBN 978-0-307-55397-3.
- Eleven Experiments That Failed. Illustrated by Nancy Carpenter. Schwartz & Wade Books. 2011. ISBN 978-0-375-84762-2.
- Sparky!. Random House Children's Books. 2014. ISBN 978-0-375-98859-2.
- While You Were Napping, Random House Children's Books, 2014. ISBN 9780375865725

=== As co-editor ===
- Jenny Offill; Elissa Schappell (2005). The Friend Who Got Away: Twenty Women's True Life Tales of Friendships that Blew Up, Burned Out or Faded Away. Crown Publishing Group. ISBN 978-0-307-41937-8.
- Jenny Offill; Elissa Schappell (2008). Money Changes Everything: Twenty-two Writers Tackle the Last Taboo with Tales of Sudden Windfalls, Staggering Debts, and Other Surprising Turns of Fortune. Broadway Books. ISBN 978-0-7679-2283-8.
