= Renata Adler =

American author, journalist and film critic (born 1937)

- Born: October 19, 1937 (age 88); Milan, Italy
- Education: Bryn Mawr College (BA); Paris-Sorbonne University (DESS); Harvard University (MA); Yale Law School (JD)
- Occupations: Journalist; essayist; critic; novelist
- Children: 1
- Writing career
- Pen name: Brett Daniels
- Period: 1962–present
- Notable works: Speedboat (1976); Pitch Dark (1983)
- Notable awards: O. Henry Award (1974); PEN/Hemingway Award (1976)

Renata Adler (born October 19, 1937) (Note: While some sources give a birth year of 1938, Adler stated in one her essays that she was born in 1937.) is an American author, journalist, and film critic. Adler was a staff writer-reporter for The New Yorker for over thirty years and the chief film critic for The New York Times from 1968 to 1969. She has also published several fiction and non-fiction books, and has been awarded the O. Henry Award, a Guggenheim Fellowship, and the PEN/Hemingway Award.

== Early life ==
Adler was born in Milan, Italy, to Frederick L. and Erna Adler while they waited for their visas to immigrate to the United States. She has two older brothers. Her family had fled Nazi Germany in 1933 and moved to the United States in 1939.

Adler grew up in Danbury, Connecticut and attended Bryn Mawr College, where she studied philosophy under José Ferrater Mora and German literature. She graduated in 1959. She then pursued her interest in philosophy, linguistics and structuralism at Paris-Sorbonne University under the tutelage of Jean Wahl and Claude Lévi-Strauss, graduating with a Diplôme d'études supérieures spécialisées (equivalent to a master's degree) in 1961. She also studied comparative literature under I. A. Richards and Roman Jakobson at Harvard University, graduating with a Master of Arts in 1962. She went on to receive a Juris Doctor from Yale Law School in 1979.

== Career ==
=== Journalism ===
In 1962, Adler became a staff writer for The New Yorker, working under William Shawn. Around the same time, she also worked briefly as a book reviewer for Harper's Bazaar under a pseudonym. In 1967, she traveled to Vietnam on assignment for McCall's magazine; while traveling abroad, she also covered the Six-Day War for The New Yorker. Adler also reported on the Selma March and the Nigerian Civil War in Biafra. While at The New Yorker, Adler became a mentee and close friend of colleague Hannah Arendt. In 1968, despite not being involved in the film trade, she was hired by Arthur Gelb to succeed Bosley Crowther as film critic for The New York Times, although she retained her office at The New Yorker. Her esoteric, literary reviews were not well received by film studio distributors. She was unhappy with the Times' deadlines and in February 1969, she was replaced by Vincent Canby and returned to The New Yorker, remaining there for another two decades. Her film reviews were collected in the book A Year in the Dark, published in 1969.

Her reporting and essays for The New Yorker on politics, war, and civil rights were reprinted in Toward a Radical Middle. Her introduction to that volume provided an early definition of radical centrism as a political philosophy. Her "Letter from the Palmer House" was included in the collection The Best Magazine Articles of the Seventies.

In the early 1970s, Adler taught theater and film at Hunter College in New York City. In 1973, John Doar, whom Adler had met while covering the Selma March, approached her with an offer to write speeches for Peter Rodino, the chairman of the Nixon impeachment inquiry of the House Judiciary Committee. Adler accepted, and would later publish Pitch Dark (1983), which fictionalized an affair she had with Burke Marshall, a fellow committee member.

In 1980, upon the publication of her New Yorker colleague Pauline Kael's collection When the Lights Go Down, she published an 8,000-word review in The New York Review of Books that dismissed the book as "jarringly, piece by piece, line by line, and without interruption, worthless", arguing that Kael's post-1960s work contained "nothing certainly of intelligence or sensibility", and faulting her "quirks [and] mannerisms", including Kael's repeated use of the "bullying" imperative and rhetorical question. Adler's motivations were considered to be either wanting to "uphold The New Yorker's usually high standards" or stemming from "personal differences with Kael". The piece, which stunned Kael and quickly became infamous in literary circles, was described by Time as "the New York literary Mafia['s] bloodiest case of assault and battery in years." New Yorker editor William Shawn called Adler's attack "unfortunate" and mentioned his admiration for Kael, saying that her "work is its own defense"; David Denby, of New York magazine, wrote that Adler "had an old-fashioned notion of prose". Kael's own response was indifferent: "I'm sorry that Ms. Adler doesn't respond to my writing. What else can I say?"

In 1998, Adler wrote a long essay about the Starr Report (issued by Independent Counsel Ken Starr about his investigation of President Bill Clinton) for Vanity Fair. The Starr Report led to Clinton's impeachment; Adler argued that it contained evidence of Starr's abuse of power in his pursuit of Clinton. She called the Starr Report "an utterly preposterous document: inaccurate, mindless, biased, disorganized, unprofessional, and corrupt. What it is textually is a voluminous work of demented pornography, with many fascinating characters and several largely hidden story lines. What it is politically is an attempt, through its own limitless preoccupation with sexual material, to set aside, even obliterate, the relatively dull requirements of real evidence and constitutional procedure."

In 1999, Adler published Gone: The Last Days of The New Yorker, a memoir of her time at the magazine. The book's scathing critique of the magazine under the editorship of William Shawn's successors, Robert Gottlieb and Tina Brown, alienated Adler from New York literary circles; in 2013, The Guardian's Rachel Cooke wrote: "For Adler, the shutters came down, and quickly. In the weeks that followed the publication of Gone, the New York Times published no fewer than eight negative articles about her 'irritable little book' and ran a leader questioning her ethics. Her relationship with the New Yorker irredeemably soured and, other newspapers and magazines lining up to send her to Coventry [in Connecticut], she found herself not only without a berth, but without any work to speak of." In 2001, reflecting on her years in journalism, Adler said, "The New York Times was pretty good, although there were always limits on what it could do culturally. But they were so aware of their power that the question of what was honorable was very important to the editors of that time. I have the impression it does not arise any longer at The New Yorker or at The New York Times."

Since the publication of her book Canaries in the Mineshaft: Essays on Politics and the Media in 2001, Adler has written sparingly. In 2004, Melville House published Irreparable Harm: The U.S. Supreme Court and the Decision that Made George W. Bush President, a virulent critique of the Bush v. Gore Supreme Court decision that Adler originally wrote for The New Republic in 2001. In 2017, she wrote a piece for Lapham's Quarterly on Germany's response to the 2015 European migrant crisis.

In 2013, Adler's novels Speedboat and Pitch Dark, which were both critically acclaimed upon publication (1976 and 1983, respectively) but rapidly fell into obscurity, were reissued by New York Review Books (NYRB). Two years later, NYRB published After the Tall Timber, a collection of Adler's nonfictional work.

=== Other activities ===
In the 2000s, Adler taught journalism and English literature at Boston University, also serving in the University Professors Program.

In 2004, she served as a media fellow at Stanford University's Hoover Institution.

Adler was selected as the 2016 Writer-in-Residence for the International Literature Festival held at Utrecht University.

== Honors ==
In 1968, Adler's essay "Letter from the Palmer House", which appeared in The New Yorker, was included in The Best Magazine Articles of 1967. In 1973, Adler received a Guggenheim Fellowship for General Nonfiction. In 1974, Adler's short story "Brownstone" received first prize in the O. Henry Award Best Short Stories of 1973. The same story was selected for the O. Henry Collection Best Short Stories of the Seventies.

In 1977, Adler's novel Speedboat won the Hemingway Foundation/PEN Award, an annual award to recognize a distinguished achievement in debut fiction. In 1987, she was elected to the American Academy of Arts and Letters, and in 1989 she received an honorary doctorate from the Georgetown University Law Center. In 2021, Adler received an honorary doctorate from Oberlin College.

Her "Letter from Selma", originally published in The New Yorker in 1965, was included in the Library of America compendium Reporting Civil Rights: American Journalism 1963–1973 (2003), and an essay on the movie In Cold Blood from her tenure as film critic for The New York Times is included in the Library of America compendium American Movie Critics: An Anthology From the Silents Until Now.

== Personal life ==
In the 1960s, Adler was briefly engaged to Reuel Wilson, the son of Edmund Wilson and Mary McCarthy, whom she met while studying at Harvard. Adler has one son, Stephen, whom she adopted as an infant in 1986. As of 2015, she lives in Newtown, Connecticut.

In her memoir Then Again, Diane Keaton said that her character Renata in the 1978 Woody Allen movie Interiors was inspired by Adler.

== Bibliography ==
Fiction

- Speedboat. New York: Random House. 1976. ISBN 0-394-48876-8.
- Pitch Dark. New York: Knopf. 1983. ISBN 0-394-50374-0.

Nonfiction

- A Year in the Dark: Journal of a Film Critic, 1968–69. New York: Random House. 1969.
- Toward a Radical Middle: Fourteen Pieces of Reporting and Criticism. New York: Random House. 1970.
- Reckless Disregard: Westmoreland v. CBS et al., Sharon v. Time. New York: Knopf. 1986. ISBN 0-394-52751-8.
- Gone: The Last Days of The New Yorker. New York: Simon & Schuster. 1999. ISBN 0-684-80816-1.
- Canaries in the Mineshaft: Essays on Politics and the Media. New York: St. Martin's Press. 2001. ISBN 0-312-27520-X.
- Irreparable Harm: The U.S. Supreme Court and the Decision that Made George W. Bush President. Hoboken, New Jersey: Melville House Publishing. 2004. ISBN 0-9749609-5-0.
- After the Tall Timber: Collected Non-Fiction. New York: New York Review of Books. 2015. ISBN 978-1-59017-879-9.

== Footnotes ==
Media offices
Preceded by Bosley Crowther	Chief film critic of The New York Times; 1968-1969	Succeeded by Vincent Canby
