= WDFM =

WDFM may refer to:

- WDFM (FM), a radio station (98.1 FM) licensed to serve Defiance, Ohio, United States
- WNHO-LD, a low-power television station (channel 35, virtual 26) licensed to serve Defiance, Ohio, which held the call sign WDFM-LP from 1997 to 2018
- WPSU (FM), a radio station (91.5 FM) licensed to serve State College, Pennsylvania, United States, which used the call sign WDFM until August 1984
- The Walt Disney Family Museum
