= Terry Ryan =

Terry Ryan may refer to:

- Terry Ryan, Playboy Playmate of the Month in December 1954
- Terry Ryan (ice hockey, born 1977), former NHL player
- Terry Ryan (ice hockey, born 1952), former WHA player
- Terry Ryan (writer) (1946–2007), American writer and author of the book The Prize Winner of Defiance, Ohio
- Terry Ryan (baseball) (born 1953), former Minnesota Twins General Manager
- Terry Ryan (tennis) (born 1942), South African tennis player in the 1960s and 70s
- Terry Ryan (screenwriter) (1922–2001), American television screenwriter
- Terry Ryan (racing driver) (born 1938), former NASCAR Cup Series driver
- Terry Ryan, author of Basic 7.0 used in the Commodore 128
- Terence Ryan (director) (born 1948), British film director, writer and producer
- Terence Ryan (musician), American musician
