= Jingle =

Short song or tune used in advertising and for other commercial uses

A jingle is a short song or tune used in advertising and for other commercial uses. Jingles are a form of sound branding. A jingle contains one or more hooks and meanings that explicitly promote the product or service being advertised, usually through the use of one or more advertising slogans. Ad buyers use jingles in radio and television commercials; they can also be used in non-advertising contexts to establish or maintain a brand image. Many jingles are also created using snippets of popular songs, in which lyrics are modified to appropriately advertise the product or service.

== History ==
The first radio commercial jingle aired in December 1926, for Wheaties cereal.

Have you tried Wheaties? They're whole wheat with all of the bran.

Won't you try Wheaties? For wheat is the best food of man.

They're crispy and crunchy the whole year through, The kiddies never tire of them and neither will you.

So just try Wheaties, The best breakfast food in the land.

— Wheaties Jingle (1926)

The Wheaties jingle, with its lyrical hooks, was seen by its owners as extremely successful. According to one account, General Mills had seriously planned to end production of Wheaties in 1929 on the basis of poor sales. Soon after the song "Have you tried Wheaties?" aired in Minnesota, however, sales spiked there. Of the 53,000 cases of Wheaties breakfast cereal sold, 40,000 were sold in the Twin Cities market. After advertising manager Samuel Chester Gale pointed out that this was the only location where "Have You Tried Wheaties?" was being aired at the time, the success of the jingle was accepted by the company. Encouraged by the results of this new method of advertising, General Mills changed its brand strategy. Instead of dropping the cereal, it purchased nationwide commercial time for the advertisement. The resultant climb in sales single-handedly established the "Wheaties" brand nationwide. After General Mills' success, other companies began to investigate this new method of advertisement. Initially, the jingle circumvented the ban on direct advertising that the National Broadcasting Company, the dominant broadcasting chain, was trying to maintain at the time.

A jingle, it was discovered, could get a brand's name embedded in the heads of potential customers, despite not fitting into the traditional definition of "advertisement" accepted in the late 1920s. In this sense, the rise of the jingle marks a critical milestone in the development of comprehensive marketing, which would become the inclusive interdisciplinary term for the field.

A host of American companies—mostly small local businesses—recognized the potential of jingles and began turning to the general public as a means of outsourcing their own jingle development via mail-in contests in the 1950s and, to a lesser extent, in the 1960s. Individuals who emerged triumphant from these contests won prizes of all sizes and varieties, usually dominated by items that the sponsoring company had ready access to provide (e.g. a three-year supply of Ivory soap, a car, etc.). Submissions would be collected (always accompanied by proof of purchase), scrutinized, scored, presented to controlling boards, and then a winner would be declared. Contesting developed as a form of side gig for a small but notable number of lyrical and sharp-witted American housewives, bringing with it an understated brand of feminism that harmonized so well with the housewife vocation that it remained largely unnoticed and undocumented.

In The Prize Winner of Defiance, Ohio, author Terri Ryan chronicles the adult life of her late mother, virtuosic contester and jingle-writer Evelyn Ryan, who used the winnings from hundreds of such contests to effectively support her family of twelve as their primary breadwinner without shortchanging the domestic responsibilities impressed on her by wider society at the time.

The art of the jingle reached its peak around the economic boom of the 1950s. The jingle was used in the advertising of branded products such as breakfast cereals, candy, snacks, soda pop, tobacco, and beer. Various franchises and products aimed at the consumers' self-image, such as automobiles, personal hygiene products (including deodorants, mouthwash, shampoo, and toothpaste), and household cleaning products, especially detergent, also used jingles.

=== Jingle downturn ===
In August 2016, The Atlantic reported that in the United States, the once popular jingle was now being replaced by advertisers with a mixture of older and recent pop music to make their commercials memorable. In 1998, there were 153 jingles in a sample of 1,279 national commercials; by 2011, the number of jingles had dropped to eight jingles out of 306 commercials.

== Types of jingles ==
One of the longest running jingles is for McCormick Foods' Aeroplane Jelly. Composed in Australia before 1943, the jingle has been used in advertising well into the 21st century. During the '40s, it made itself famous, or infamous, as it was played more than 100 times a day on some stations.

Another long-running jingle is "Like a Good Neighbor, State Farm is There", which was composed by Barry Manilow and has been used in one form or another in commercials for State Farm Insurance since 1971.

The 6-note ABS-CBN jingle, used from 1967 to September 23, 1972, and since its reopening on September 14, 1986, serves as the network's jingle as it is used on various IDs, such as Christmas and Summer station IDs.

Jingles can also be used for parody purposes, popularized in Top 40/CHR radio formats, primarily Hot30 Countdown, and used primarily for branding reasons.

Television station idents have also introduced their own audio jingles to strengthen their brand identities, for example the melodic motifs of Channel 4's Fourscore or BBC One's 'Circle' idents.

Most often the term "radio jingles" can be used to collectively describe all elements of radio station branding or identification. Accurately the term in the context of radio is used to describe only those station branding elements which are musical, or sung. Sung jingles are the most common form of radio station branding otherwise known as imaging. A radio jingle therefore is created in a studio by session singers and includes a musical representation of the radio station name and frequency. Radio stations will subcontract to specialist radio jingle producers who will create the musical sound and melody, along with recording the session singers. The elements, termed a donut, will then be dispatched to the radio station in various time variations to be edited by local radio producers before being broadcast between songs, or into and out of commercial breaks. Alternatively, jingles can be made in-house by production staff.

== Copyright ==
When commissioned to write jingles, writers will sometimes create all aspects of the jingle: music, lyrics, performance and recording. In this case, the writer may be paid for these aspects as well as a flat fee. Although the advertiser receives rights free of writer royalty, sometimes the writer will try to retain performance rights. In most cases the writer retains no rights whatsoever. In other cases, advertisers purchase jingles in package deals from producers specializing in jingles. The writers working for these producers receive a salary and do not retain rights. The rights belong to the producer, who may sell them to an advertiser.

== See also ==
- Radio sweeper
- Teaser trailer
