= WNDH =

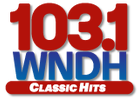
- Napoleon, Ohio; United States
- Broadcast area: Napoleon, Ohio, Bryan, Ohio, Defiance, Ohio, Wauseon, Ohio
- Frequency: 103.1 MHz
- Branding: 103.1 WNDH

Programming
- Format: Classic hits
- Affiliations: NBC News Radio; Ohio State Sports Network; Premiere Networks

Ownership
- Owner: iHeartMedia, Inc.; (iHM Licenses, LLC)
- Sister stations: WONW, WDFM, WZOM

History
- First air date: June 1972; 53 years ago

Technical information
- Licensing authority: FCC
- Facility ID: 40713
- Class: A
- ERP: 3,300 watts
- HAAT: 91 meters (299 ft)
- Transmitter coordinates: 41°18′0.00″N 84°9′22.00″W

Links
- Public license information: Public file; LMS
- Webcast: Listen live (via iHeartRadio)
- Website: wndh1031.iheart.com

WNDH (103.1 FM) is a radio station broadcasting a classic hits format. Licensed to Napoleon, Ohio, United States, the station is currently owned by iHeartMedia, Inc.

== History ==
WNDH began broadcasting in 1972 and originally featured a beautiful music format, which has been updated over the years to an adult contemporary sound. In 1989, Clear Channel Communications (now iHeartMedia) bought the station. The new owners tweaked the station's branding to 103.1 FM WNDH the One. The station switched to Clear Channel's Classic Hits format in early September 2014, with the former AC format moving to sister station 98.1 WDFM. The station's coverage area in Northwest Ohio includes the cities of Defiance, Bryan, and Wauseon, in addition to Napoleon.

The station's former logo, used from 1989-2014.

After switching to the classic hits format in early September 2014 WNDH changed its branding to The All New 103.1 WNDH, NW Ohio's Classic Hits! similar to other Clear Channel-owned classic hits radio stations. Clear Channel also changed its name on September 16, 2014, to iHeartMedia.

== Broadcast tower ==
The WNDH broadcast tower is located near the intersection of County Road J and Township Road 15 in Flatrock Township in Henry County, Ohio. Its coordinates are 41.3, -84.156111.

== Programming ==
WNDH is affiliated with iHeartRadio, NBC News Radio and features a classic hits format. WNDH also broadcasts Ohio State Buckeyes football and men's basketball, as well as local high school football, basketball, baseball, and other various local events in Henry County and Northwest Ohio.
