= Kevin C. McCann =

Kevin C. McCann (October 12, 1904 – February 21, 1981) was a biographer of Dwight D. Eisenhower and he served as president of Defiance College in Defiance, Ohio.

== Biography ==
McCann was born in the village of Dromore, County Tyrone, Ireland, where Kenwell's shop operates today. His family emigrated to Chicago when he was three years old. In 1924 and 1926 he graduated with a B.A. and a M.A., respectively, at St. Mary’s College.

In 1942, McCann joined the U.S. Army and served in New Guinea before serving as assistant to Robert P. Patterson, United States Secretary of War. In 1946, McCann met Dwight D. Eisenhower, Chief of Staff of the United States Army and served on his staff in Washington, at Columbia University (where Eisenhower was president), and in Paris at Supreme Headquarters Allied Powers Europe (SHAPE).

In 1951, McCann became president of Defiance College in Defiance, Ohio. In 1955, McCann began serving as special assistant to President Eisenhower and would continue to serve in that capacity until 1957 when he returned to Defiance College.
