= T. O. Sylvester =

American comic strip

T.O. Sylvester was a comic strip featured in the San Francisco Chronicle from 1983 to 1999. "T.O. Sylvester" was also the shared pseudonym of the strip's creative team, Sylvia Mollick and Terry Ryan. Sylvester's work was included in Gay Comix #5, #6, and #25.
