= WNHO-LD =

Television station in Fort Wayne, Indiana

- Fort Wayne, Indiana (Note: Originally licensed to Defiance, Ohio; moved to Fort Wayne in 2025.); United States
- Channels: Digital: 35 (UHF); Virtual: 26

Programming
- Affiliations: see § Subchannels

Ownership
- Owner: Metro Video Productions, Inc.
- Sister stations: WLMO-LD

History
- First air date: March 2, 1992
- Former call signs: W19BN (1992–1997); WDFM-LP (1997–2018)
- Former channel numbers: Analog: 19 (UHF, 1992–?), 26 (UHF, ?–2019); Virtual: 44 (until 2025)
- Former affiliations: Secular Independent (1992–2019); Religious Independent (2019–2024); Silent (2024–2025)
- Call sign meaning: Northwest Ohio's Hometown Television

Technical information
- Licensing authority: FCC
- Facility ID: 73389
- Class: LD
- ERP: 3.4 kW
- HAAT: 116.2 m (381 ft)
- Transmitter coordinates: 40°57′14″N 84°53′7″W

Links
- Public license information: LMS

WNHO-LD (channel 26) is a low-power television station in Fort Wayne, Indiana, United States, owned by Metro Video Productions, Inc. The station's transmitter is located on Whittern Road near Monroeville, Indiana.

Prior to 2024, WNHO-LD, then licensed to Defiance, Ohio, was a translator of Lima-based religious/secular independent station WLMA (channel 44) which was owned by American Christian Television Services. WNHO-LD's broadcast area included most of Defiance, Fulton, Henry, Paulding and Williams counties.

Until 2018, the station was operated by iHeartMedia's WDFM radio at 98.1 FM. Its schedule consisted primarily of syndicated programming with a variety of topics including gardening, motorsports, agriculture, home improvement, and personal health.

== History ==
Lankenau Small Media Network, which owned WDFM radio, established WNHO-LD on March 2, 1992, on channel 19 as W19BN. In March 1997, its calls changed to WDFM-LP.

In December 1998, Jacor Broadcasting, which would later merge with Clear Channel, acquired WDFM and WDFM-LP from Lankenau.

WDFM-LP later moved its frequency from channel 19 to channel 26 to make way for the digital signal of Fort Wayne's WISE-TV, which broadcasts its digital signal on channel 18.

On April 20, 2007, Clear Channel entered into an agreement to sell its entire television stations group to Newport Television. However, WDFM-LP was not included in the sale, as it was operated directly by the radio station, instead of the television group.

In July 2018, what was now iHeartMedia filed to donate WDFM-LP to American Christian Television Services (then-owner of WTLW, now WLMA in Lima, Ohio), with a requirement that ACTS switch the call letters. The transfer was complete on October 5, 2018, at which point the station's call sign was changed to WNHO-LP. ACTS acquired the station to provide a UHF repeater of WTLW, which broadcast on physical channel 4 and struggled with full-market over-the-air penetration due to being on a low-VHF frequency.

In early 2019, WTLW announced plans to upgrade WNHO-LP to a digital station and move its broadcast channel to 35. WNHO-LD signed on the air on October 4, 2019.

On August 1, 2024, WNHO ended operations, as WLMB prepares to relocate onto UHF physical channel 35, effectively making WNHO-LD superfluous.

On July 25, 2025, WNHO returned to the air as a Fort Wayne station on UHF channel 35.

== Technical information ==
=== Subchannels ===
The station's signal is multiplexed:

Subchannels of WNHO-LD
Channel	Res.	Short name	Programming
26.1	480i	CRIME	NBC True CRMZ
26.2	480i	COMET	Comet
26.3	480i	NEWSMAX	Newsmax2
26.4	480i	OAN+	One America Plus
26.5	480i	QVC	QVC
26.6	480i	JTV	Jewelry Television
26.7	480i	SHOP LC	Shop LC
26.8	480i	WISH-TV	WISH-TV newscasts

== Previous logo ==
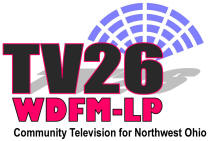
