= Fort Defiance (Ohio) =

American fort of the late 18th century

- Part of the Northwest Territory of the United States
- present day Defiance, Ohio
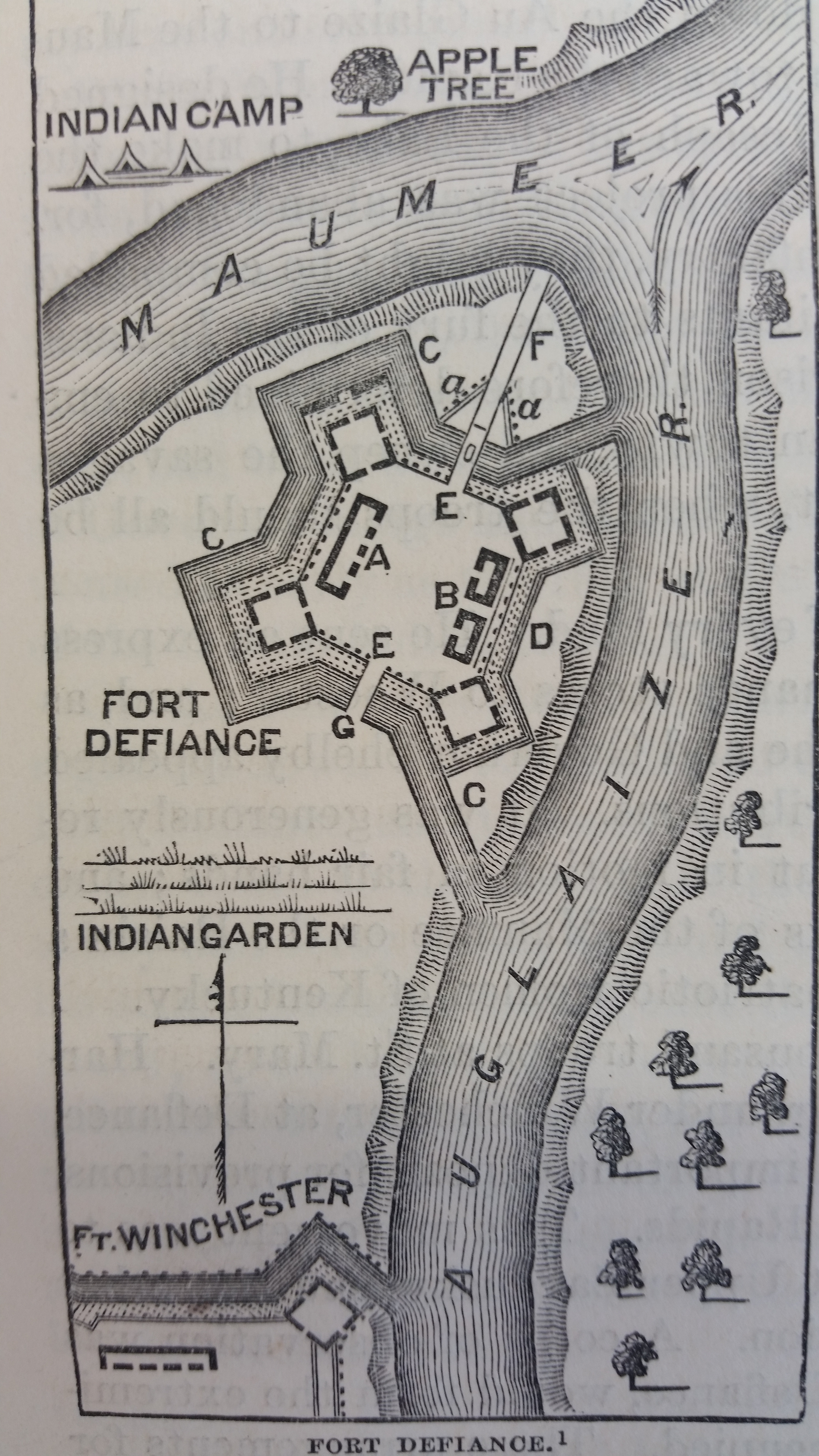
- Fort Defiance

Site history
- Built: August 1794
- Fate: Abandoned in 1796; Fort Winchester constructed nearby (c. 1812)
- Battles/wars: Fort Defiance: Northwest Indian War; Fort Winchester: Tecumseh's War, War of 1812

Garrison information
- Past commanders: Anthony Wayne
- Occupants: United States troops

Fort Defiance was an American military fortification built in 1794 during the Northwest Indian War in what was then the Northwest Territory. Following the Treaty of Greenville, the fort was abandoned in 1796. The site of the fort, adjacent to where the Auglaize River flows into the Maumee River, now lies within the city of Defiance, Ohio.

== History ==
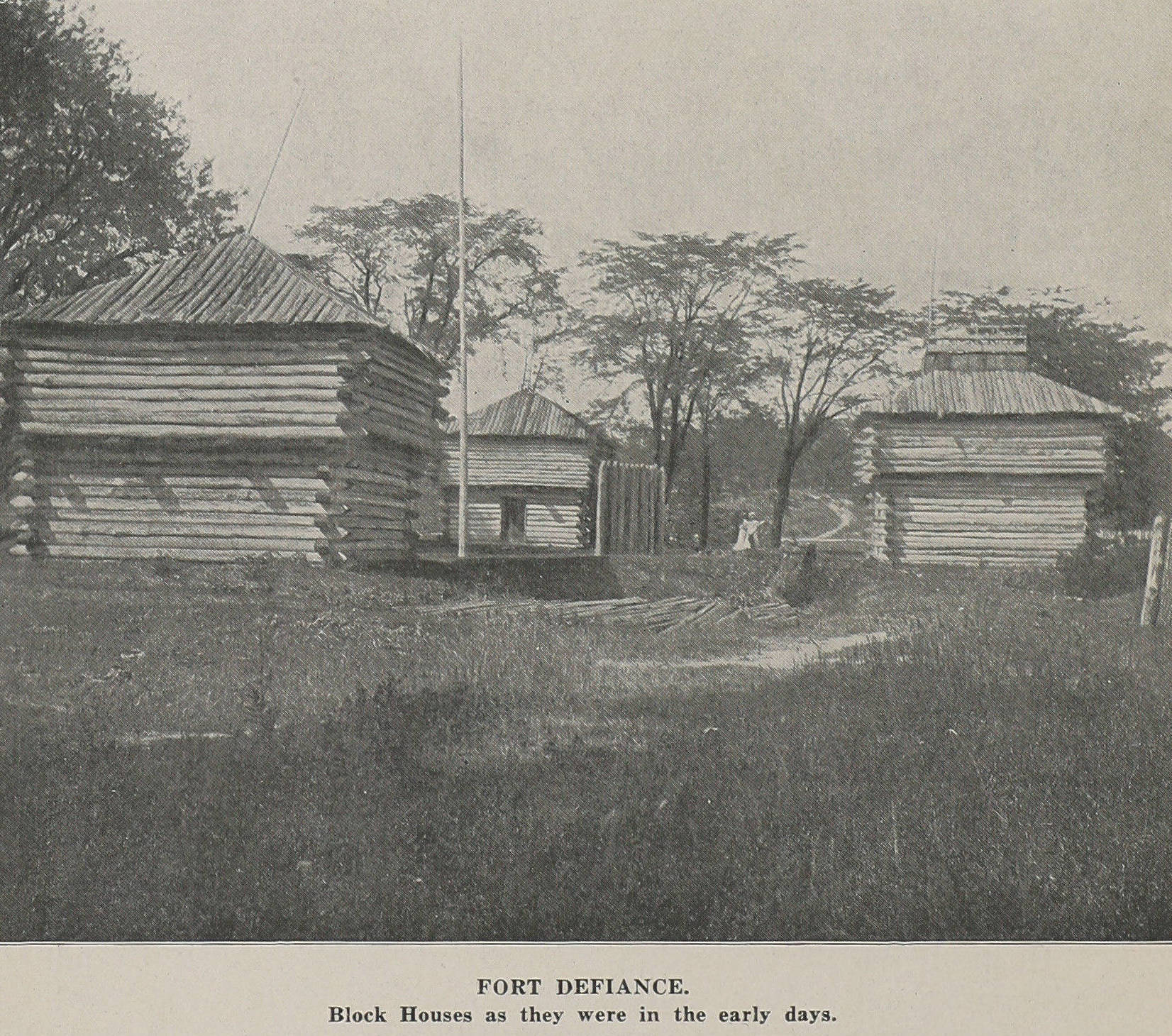
From "Early History of the Maumee Valley," 1902

- Fort Defiance Park
- U.S. National Register of Historic Places
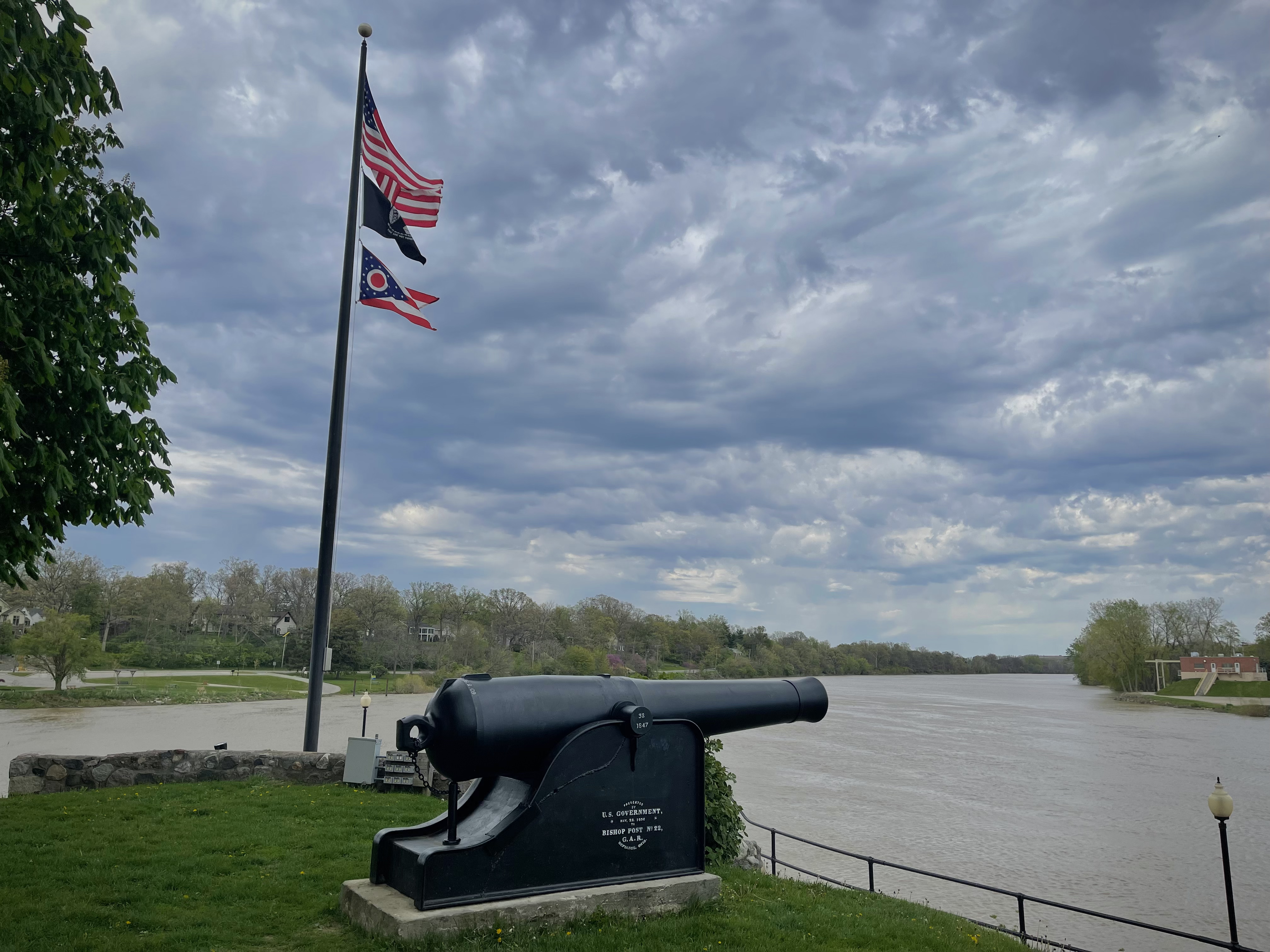
- Park overlooking the Auglaize and Maumee rivers

- Location within Ohio Location within the United States
- Location: Fort St., Defiance, Ohio
- Coordinates: 41°17′15″N 84°21′25″W
- Area: 1.3 acres (0.53 ha)
- Built: 1794
- Architect: Major Henry Burbeck
- NRHP reference No.: 80002989
- Added to NRHP: June 23, 1980

The fort was built at the direction of Major General "Mad Anthony" Wayne in the second week of August 1794 at the confluence of the Auglaize and Maumee rivers. It was one of a line of defenses constructed by American forces in the campaign leading to the Northwest Indian War's Battle of Fallen Timbers on August 20, 1794.

Work began on August 9, 1794, and was completed by August 17. The name was derived from a declaration by Charles Scott, who was leading a band of Kentucky militiamen in support of Wayne, that: "I defy the English, Indians, and all the devils of hell to take it." The post was considered one of the strongest fortifications built in that period.

Before and during the Battle of Fallen Timbers, Wayne ordered the destruction of all Native American villages and their crops within a 50-mile (80 km) radius of the fort. The land which originally belonged to Native Americans was ceded to the United States by the British after the American Revolutionary War. The British would later supply and influence local tribes to take up arms.

Under terms of the Treaty of Greenville, signed on August 3, 1795, the native nations ceded 6 square miles (16 km^{2}) around the fort and allowed the Americans to maintain a trading post there, even though it was within the area of land defined by the "Greenville Treaty Line", beyond which Americans had agreed not to settle. Wayne promised the land of "Indiana", the remaining land to the west, to remain Indian forever. During the treaty meeting, Wayne brought with him food supplies for the natives and made sure crops were planted again. The fort was abandoned in 1796.

== Later events ==
Fort Defiance served as a reference point for defining the boundary line of land cession in the Treaty of Detroit in 1807. This north–south line was used again as the Michigan Meridian in the survey of lands in Michigan.

Fort Winchester was constructed on a nearby site in 1812 by Gen. William Henry Harrison.

The city of Defiance, Ohio, was founded at the fort's location in 1822. In 1904, the site of the fort was chosen for the Defiance Public Library.

Today, a park occupies the site of the fort, which was added to the National Register of Historic Places in 1980.

== Sources ==
- Nelson, Paul D. (1986). "General Charles Scott, the Kentucky Mounted Volunteers, and the Northwest Indian Wars, 1784–1794". Journal of the Early Republic. 6 (3): 219–251. doi:10.2307/3122915. JSTOR 3122915.
- Catalano, Joshua (2019). "Blue Jacket, Anthony Wayne, and the Psychological and Symbolic War for Ohio, 1790-1795". Ohio History. 126 (1): 5-34.
