= WONW =

- Defiance, Ohio; United States
- Broadcast area: Defiance, Ohio; Bryan, Ohio; Napoleon, Ohio; Paulding, Ohio
- Frequency: 1280 kHz
- Branding: WONW AM 1280

Programming
- Format: News/talk/sports
- Affiliations: Fox News Radio; Fox Sports Radio; Compass Media Networks; Premiere Networks

Ownership
- Owner: iHeartMedia, Inc.; (iHM Licenses, LLC)
- Sister stations: WDFM, WNDH, WZOM

History
- First air date: 1948; 78 years ago

Technical information
- Licensing authority: FCC
- Facility ID: 40710
- Class: B
- Power: 1,000 watts day 500 watts night
- Transmitter coordinates: 41°16′44″N 84°23′50″W

Links
- Public license information: Public file; LMS
- Webcast: Listen live (via iHeartRadio)
- Website: wonw1280.iheart.com

WONW (1280 AM) is a news/talk/sports formatted broadcast radio station, affiliated with Fox News Radio, Fox Sports Radio, Compass Media Networks, and Premiere Networks.

WONW is licensed to Defiance, Ohio, serving the Defiance, Bryan, Napoleon, and Paulding areas. WONW is currently owned and operated by iHeartMedia.

== History ==
WONW has been on the air in Defiance since 1948 under the ownership of Tri-State Broadcasting, Inc, and started as a full service radio station with news, sports, music, and other events. WONW was a long time affiliate of the Mutual Broadcasting System until MBS shut down in 1999.

It was in 1989 when WONW changed ownership for the first time when they were acquired by Maumee Valley Broadcasting, which at the time, owned now-sister station WNDH. Maumee Valley Broadcasting would later acquire now-sister FM station WZOM in 1994.

WONW would be sold for the third time in 2000 to now-current owner Clear Channel Communications (now iHeartMedia). In 2000, WONW's format changed from country to adult standards. It would remain the format until 2006, when WONW would become a news/sports/talk station, a format they used briefly in 1998 before returning to country.

== Programming ==
Today, WONW is affiliated with Premiere Radio Networks and Fox Sports Radio, and brings talk personalities from around the country such as; Glenn Beck, Rush Limbaugh, and Dave Ramsey, as well as a locally produced talk show. WONW is also the home station for Defiance High School athletic events.
