= Defiance County Courthouse =

Local government building in the United States

The Defiance County Courthouse
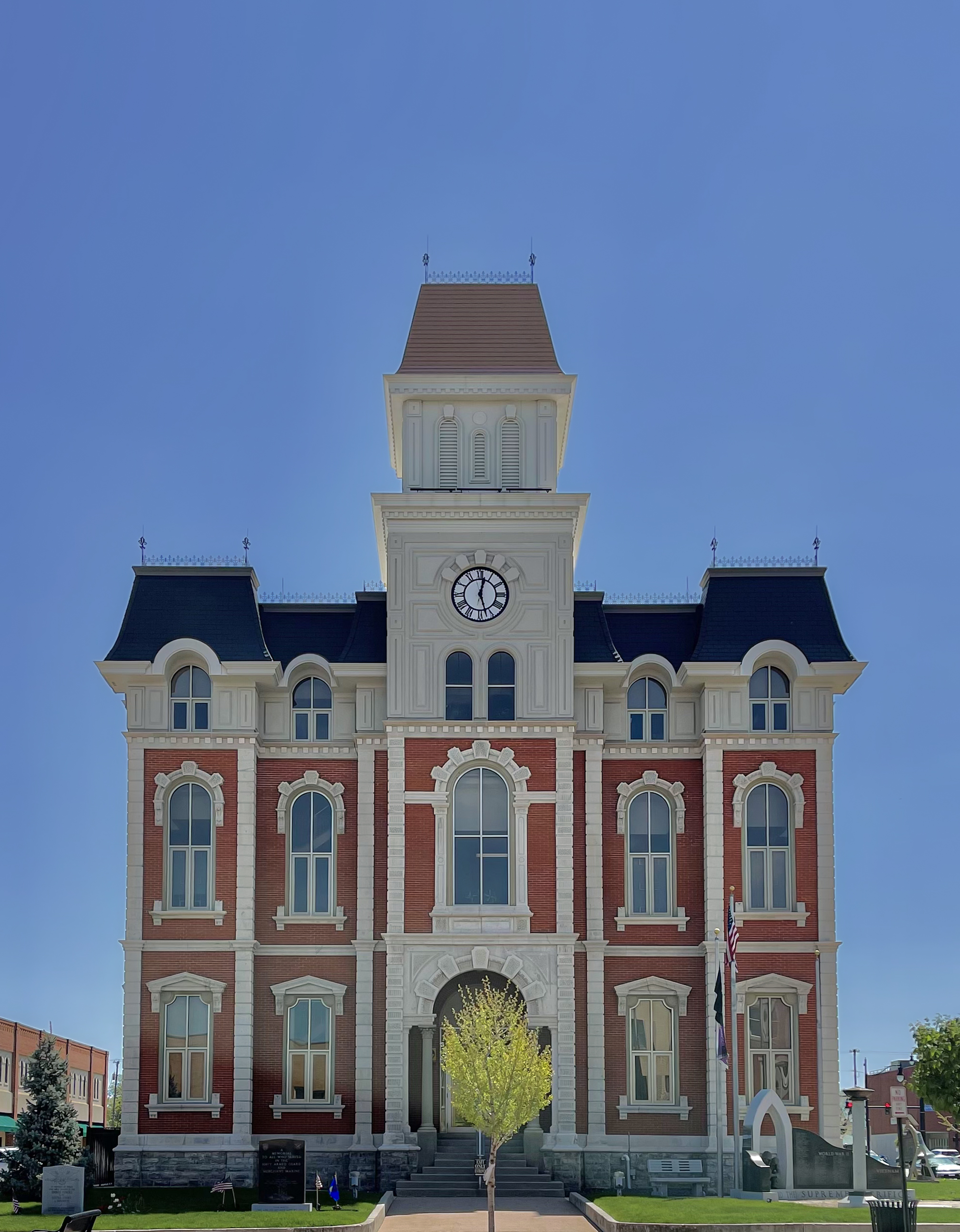
- The Defiance County Courthouse
- Interactive map of the The Defiance County Courthouse area

General information
- Architectural style: Italianate
- Location: Defiance, Ohio, United States
- Coordinates: 41°17′12″N 84°21′41″W
- Construction started: 1871
- Completed: 1873
- Cost: $72,000
- Client: Defiance County Commissioners

Design and construction
- Architect: J.C. Johnson
- Engineer: J.C. Johnson

The Defiance County Courthouse is located at 221 Clinton Street in Defiance, Ohio, United States.

== History ==
Defiance County was established in 1845 but had its roots in Williams County. The latter county was established in 1824 with the county seat at Defiance. As Williams County lost land to other counties, Defiance was no longer central for the remaining population. The county seat changed to Bryan and would have doomed Defiance if not for a proposal for a new county.

The time was right for Defiance as the population surrounding it grew to the numbers needed to form a new county. On March 4, 1845, a bill was passed to form Defiance County with the county seat in Defiance. A celebration was held on March 13 with speeches, bonfires, and banquets.

The first courts were held in a brick schoolhouse located on Wayne Street, but the first courthouse was started in October 1845. This Federal style building was designed and built by John Bostata on the site of the present courthouse. The brick structure rose two stories tall with a portico framed by four columns supporting a pediment. The rectangular building was lined with rectangular windows and pilasters with an entablature topping the facade. The roof was topped by a square drum supporting a domed cupola capped by a spire.

This courthouse served the county until 1870 as the population continued to grow. Soon the courthouse was deemed to be too small and a new courthouse was needed. The county selected the plans of architect J.C. Johnson designed in the Italianate and Second Empire styles. The courthouse was designed with a mansard roof but was decided against for safety reasons.

In 2006 the county was faced with a growing population and needed more room for the county offices. The county issued a vote to determine if the current courthouse should be razed or if a new building or addition should be built. The vote came back in favor of the building leading the county to investigate alternatives.

== Exterior ==
The three-story building has a projecting center and ends. The facade is lined with decorative stone elements along the window and door trims and pilasters. The stone foundation is windowless and contains a water table. The first floor contains long rectangular windows with triangular pediments crowning each window. The entrance is located in a small arched portico with Doric columns. The second floor once contained arched windows but the arched portion is now bricked over and contains long rectangular windows. The third floor once matched the decorative bottom floors but was removed and replaced by a modern design containing rectangular windows and a clock face.

The third floor was once topped by a balustrade, and the central projection rose into a clock tower 125 feet above the ground.

A war memorial was designed by Mark Homier and is situated in front of the courthouse and lists the names of Defiance County soldiers from World War I, World War II, the Korean War, the Vietnam War, and the Global War on Terror. The memorial depicts a grieving soldier and a nurse in the center of two gently sloping wings. The memorial also contains an eternal flame in honor of those who gave all for their country.
