= WTGN =

Radio station in Lima, Ohio

- Lima, Ohio; United States
- Broadcast area: Lima
- Frequency: 97.7 MHz

Programming
- Format: Religious

Ownership
- Owner: Associated Christian Broadcasters, Inc.

History
- First air date: 1966

Technical information
- Licensing authority: FCC
- Facility ID: 3037
- Class: A
- ERP: 6,000 watts
- HAAT: 91.0 meters (298.6 ft)
- Transmitter coordinates: 40°45′23.00″N 84°8′0.00″W

Links
- Public license information: Public file; LMS
- Webcast: Listen live
- Website: wtgn.org

WTGN (for: "The Good News") is a non-commercial FM radio station in Lima, Ohio on 97.7 MHz with an effective radiated power of 6,000 Watts. It is owned by Associated Christian Broadcasters Inc. and is Limaland's first and oldest Christian radio station. The others in the Lima area being several non-affiliated repeater stations WBCJ, WBIE, WHJM and locally originating low-power WCBV-LP.

== History ==
It was founded in 1965 and signed on one year later. At first a modest operation which operated from 8 a.m. to 8 p.m. daily, it slowly developed into a full-time schedule in 1968 becoming Lima's first 24/7 radio station. Its original studios were located just a block east of its transmitter site on Elida Road (State Route 309). The station was later instrumental in developing Christian television station WTLW in 1976 which came on the air in 1982.

== WTGN today ==
In 1984 a new studio and office facility was opened at the Elida Road transmitter site. It became affiliated with the Moody Broadcasting Network in 1986. A network of low-power translators re-broadcasting WTGN began in 1990.

FM translators

- W254CD 98.7 in Findlay
- W268AB 105.1 in Kenton

== See also ==
- WLMA
- List of radio stations in Ohio
