= Defiance Memorial Airport =

Airport in Ohio, United States

- IATA: DFI; ICAO: KDFI; FAA LID: DFI

Summary
- Airport type: Public
- Owner: Board of County Commissioners
- Serves: Defiance, Ohio
- Time zone: UTC−05:00 (-5)
  - Summer (DST): UTC−04:00 (-4)
- Elevation AMSL: 707 ft (215 m)
- Coordinates: 41°20′15″N 084°25′44″W

Map
- Location of airport in Ohio DFI (the United States)

Runways
Direction	Length		Surface
Direction	ft	m	Surface
12/30	4,199	1,280	Asphalt

Statistics (2023)
- Aircraft operations (year ending 6/14/2023): 9,420
- Based aircraft: 18
- Source: Federal Aviation Administration

Defiance Memorial Airport (IATA: DFI, ICAO: KDFI, FAA LID: DFI) is a public use airport located four nautical miles (7 km) northwest of the central business district of Defiance, in Defiance County, Ohio, United States. It is owned by the Board of County Commissioners.

== History ==
It was announced in early March 1943 that the existing airport in Defiance would likely close at the start of the following month. The Defiance County Airport Company was incorporated in late March. At a meeting in late November, Defiance County agreed to work with Williams County to find a location for a new airport between Defiance and Bryan. Four sites were evaluated in early December and one, located in part on land belonging to the county home, was provisionally selected approximately two weeks later. Before the end of the month, fundraising for the Bryan-Defiance Airport began. A few days later, $60,000 had been raised and a layout that included two paved 3,500 ft × 100 ft (1,067 m × 30 m) runways proposed. To accompany the project, State Route 15, which provided access to the airport, was to be improved and an adjacent state park was to be expanded. Two contracts, one for a company from each city, were awarded in late September 1944 for the construction of two 6-unit t-hangars. An airport manager was appointed in late April 1945 and a temporary runway approved by the CAA in early July.

A project to lengthen the north-south runway to 3,200 ft (980 m) started in mid August 1946. Three years later, by late September 1949, paving of a 3,000 ft (910 m) runway had begun.

By late June 1967, it had been renamed from Bryan-Defiance Memorial Airport to simply Defiance County Airport. A state grant was approved in mid July and awarded in September. In November, a new fixed-base operator, Defiance Air Service, assumed management of the airport. In late May 1969, shortly before its planned dedication, the airport sought an instrument landing system.

A weight limit for airplanes was instituted in June 1981 due to the poor condition of the runway.

== Facilities and aircraft ==
Defiance Memorial Airport covers an area of 314 acres (127 ha) at an elevation of 707 feet (215 m) above mean sea level. It has one runway designated 12/30 with an asphalt surface measuring 4,199 by 72 feet (1,280 x 22 m).

For the 12-month period ending June 14, 2023, the airport had 9,420 aircraft operations, an average of 26 per day: 84% general aviation, 16% air taxi and <1% military. At that time there were 18 aircraft based at this airport: 15 single-engine, and 3 multi-engine airplanes.

== Accidents and incidents ==
- On March 19, 1994, a Cessna 414 crashed while on approach to Defiance Airport. Witnesses reported the aircraft was flying erratically and low to the ground on approach, causing a crash. The probable cause of the crash was found to be the pilot's inadequate inflight decision and planning, which resulted in fuel exhaustion and the total loss of engine power.
- On September 17, 2021, a Cirrus SR 20 airplane crashed on approach to Defiance Airport. The airplane was coming in for landing when it departed from the side of the runway. The sole pilot onboard was uninjured.
- In September 2026, Defiance Airport was featured in a BBC radio fictional drama about its use as an emergency landing site during the September 11 attacks in 2001.

== See also ==
- List of airports in Ohio
