= WDFM (FM) =

Hot adult contemporary radio station in Defiance, Ohio

- Defiance, Ohio; United States
- Frequency: 98.1 MHz
- Branding: Mix 98.1

Programming
- Format: Hot adult contemporary
- Affiliations: Premiere Networks

Ownership
- Owner: iHeartMedia, Inc.; (iHM Licenses, LLC)
- Sister stations: WONW, WNDH, WZOM

History
- First air date: 1985; 41 years ago
- Call sign meaning: Defiance FM

Technical information
- Licensing authority: FCC
- Facility ID: 73393
- Class: B
- ERP: 50,000 watts
- HAAT: 152 meters (499 ft)
- Transmitter coordinates: 41°17′28.00″N 84°32′17.00″W

Links
- Public license information: Public file; LMS
- Webcast: Listen live (via iHeartRadio)
- Website: mix981fm.iheart.com

WDFM (98.1 MHz) is an FM radio station located in Defiance, Ohio. The station is owned and operated as of March 2024 by iHeartMedia, Inc., which purchased it from Lankenau-Small Media in 1999. It has a broadcast tower in Sherwood, Ohio.

WDFM formerly operated an on-channel booster station in Fort Wayne, Indiana, but did not rebuild it after a winter storm toppled the booster station's tower. The main WDFM signal reaches much of Fort Wayne, but the station does not target that region. During certain conditions, the station can be received in the metro Detroit area.

== Programming ==
Currently, it broadcasts a hot adult contemporary radio format as Mix 98.1, Today's Variety. The station also plays Christmas music for much of November and December. Prior to its rebranding in 1999, WDFM was of the AC Hot 30 format, and prior to that and back to its sign-on in 1985, the station played easy listening music.

== Television ==
WDFM also operated a low power television station, WDFM-LP (now WNHO-LD) channel 26. When owned by Lankenau-Small Media, they experimented with some syndicated programming, with a community bulletin board airing when no programming is scheduled. It was the last television station owned by iHeartMedia and was considered a side business of WDFM radio. WDFM-LP was donated to American Christian Television Services in 2018, and was later shut down in 2024.
