= Defiance College =

Private college in Defiance, Ohio, U.S.

Coordinates: 41°17′48″N 84°21′30″W

- Former name: Defiance Female Seminary (1850–1903)
- Motto: "Defi the ordinary"
- Type: Private college
- Established: 1850; 176 years ago
- Religious affiliation: United Church of Christ
- Academic affiliations: CIC
- Endowment: $19.2 million (2020)
- President: Richanne C. Mankey
- Faculty: 86
- Students: 650
- Undergraduates: 450
- Postgraduates: 100
- Location: Defiance, Ohio, United States
- Campus: 150 acres (61 ha)
- Colors: Purple and gold
- Nicknames: Yellow Jackets, Lady Jackets
- Sporting affiliations: NAIA – WHAC; NAIA – MSFA
- Website: www.defiance.edu

The Defiance College is a private college in Defiance, Ohio, United States. Affiliated with the United Church of Christ, the campus includes eighteen buildings and access to the 200-acre (80.9 ha) Thoreau Wildlife Sanctuary. The college is accredited by the Higher Learning Commission.

== History ==
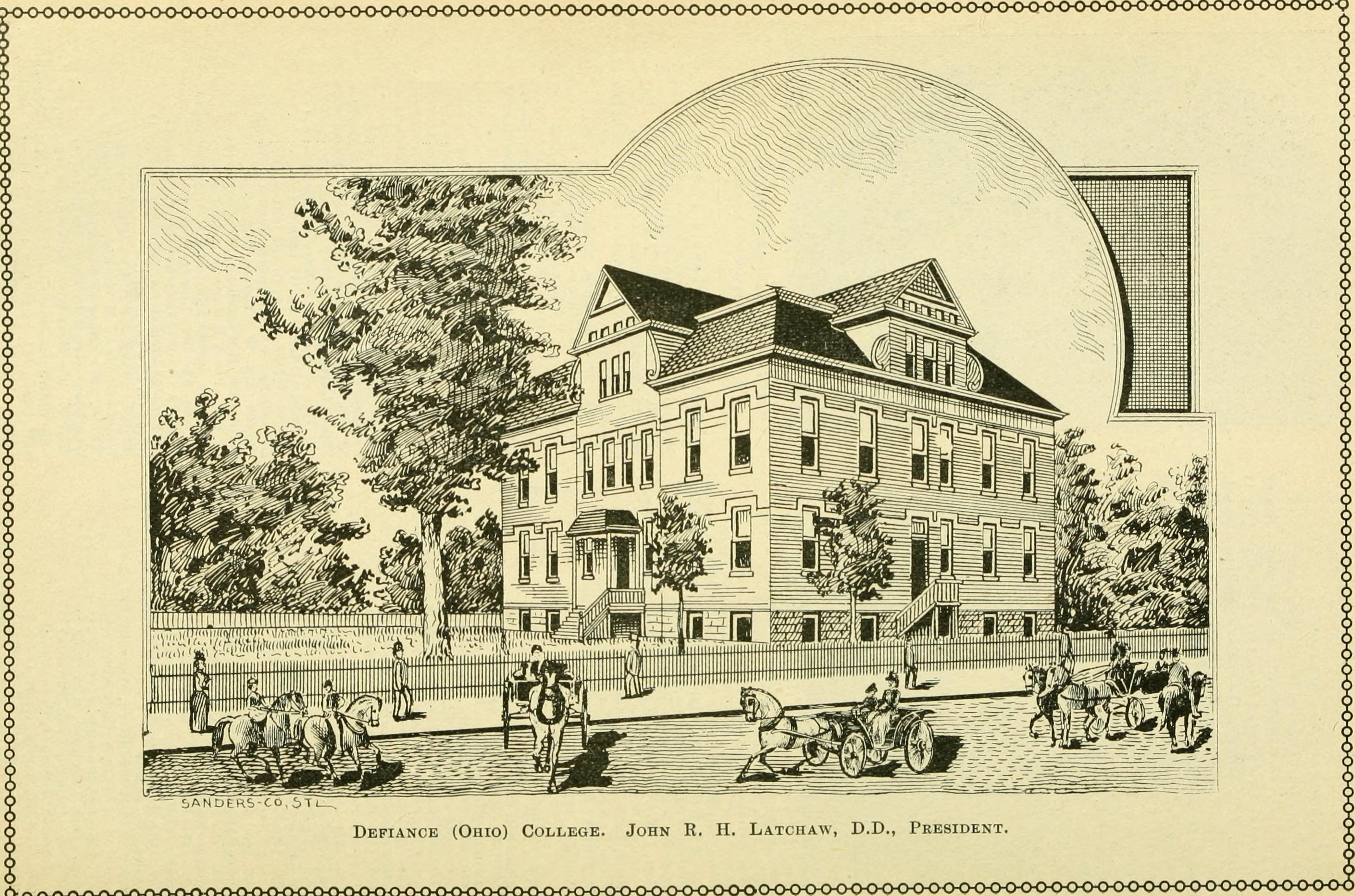
Defiance College in 1900

The college began as Defiance Female Seminary in 1850 and was opened by the Christian Connection, which itself later became part of the United Church of Christ, to provide schooling for young women. In 1903, the Defiance Female Seminary formally became Defiance College, making it one of only two religious-affiliated colleges to begin operation in Ohio during the 20th century.

During President Kevin McCann's leadership (1951–1964), the campus increased in size to 140 acres (56.7 ha); the library, student union, and Pilgrim halls were built; and old buildings were renovated. President Dwight D. Eisenhower paid two visits to Defiance. On October 15, 1953, he laid the cornerstone for the Anthony Wayne Library of American Study. Eisenhower also visited the campus on May 26, 1963, to deliver the commencement address, at which time the college announced that one room in the library had been designated "the Eisenhower Room", honoring the friendship between Eisenhower and Kevin C. McCann.

The college is accredited by the Higher Learning Commission. The college was put on probation in 2023 for concerns with one out of the eighteen accreditation criteria. In June 2025, the sanction was removed.

== Athletics ==
The Defiance College Yellow Jackets moved conferences at the end of the 2023–24 athletic season from the Heartland Collegiate Athletic Conference (HCAC) of NCAA Division III to the Wolverine–Hoosier Athletic Conference (WHAC) in every sport except for football, where they are a member of the Mid-States Football Association (MSFA) and are a part of the NAIA.

The Defiance College athletic program has begun the processes of adding new athletic programs in the near future. In the 2025–26 athletic season, men's volleyball, women's bowling, and powerlifting will be the newest additions to the expanded athletic program. At the current time, it is believed men's volleyball and women's bowling will also be competing in the WHAC. Powerlifting is not confirmed at this time.

=== Men's ===
- Baseball
- Basketball
- Cross country
- Football
- Golf
- Soccer
- Track and field
- Wrestling
- Volleyball (2025–26)

=== Women's ===
- Basketball
- Cross country
- Golf
- Soccer
- Softball
- Track and field
- Cheer and Dance
- Volleyball
- Bowling (2025–26)

=== Co-ed ===
- Cheerleading
- Esports
- Powerlifting (2025–26)

== Notable alumni ==
- John Ashton, actor
- Pam Borton, college basketball coach
- Ben Davis, professional football player
- Esquire Jauchem, producer, director, and designer in theater, opera, dance, and television
- Don Martindale, college and professional football coach
- Fraser Metzger, clergyman, politician, and college administrator
- Richard Mourdock, Treasurer of State, Indiana
- Bruce Shingledecker, painter
