= The Prize Winner of Defiance, Ohio =

- Theatrical release poster
- Directed by: Jane Anderson
- Written by: Jane Anderson
- Based on: The Prize Winner of Defiance, Ohio by Terry Ryan
- Produced by: Jack Rapke; Steve Starkey; Robert Zemeckis
- Starring: Julianne Moore; Woody Harrelson; Laura Dern
- Cinematography: Jonathan Freeman
- Edited by: Robert Dalva
- Music by: John Frizzell
- Production companies: Revolution Studios; ImageMovers
- Distributed by: Go Fish Pictures
- Release date: October 14, 2005
- Running time: 99 minutes
- Country: United States
- Language: English
- Budget: $12 million
- Box office: $689,028

The Prize Winner of Defiance, Ohio is a 2005 American biographical drama film written and directed by Jane Anderson. It is based on the 2001 book by Terry Ryan, and stars Julianne Moore, Woody Harrelson, and Laura Dern. The film was produced by Revolution Studios and ImageMovers and received a limited release on October 14, 2005 by Go Fish Pictures.

== Plot ==
In Defiance, Ohio, housewife Evelyn Ryan managed to support her husband, Kelly, and their 10 children by winning jingle-writing contests. Kelly failed to support his family, in part due to apparent alcoholism and low self-esteem. He dreamed of being a singer but lost his singing voice in a car accident, and was often cruel, abusive, and prone to violent outbursts when he is drunk.

Evelyn wins useful things such as a large freezer, ice buckets, a washer and dryer set, a trip to New York City, a window, a sports car, a shopping spree in her local grocery store, and ice crushers; as well as less useful or necessary things like sleds, boots, a pony, a palm tree, a camera, dance shoes, a boat motor, pogo sticks, a case of dog food, and a lifetime supply of bird seed, which she exchanges for money. Kelly, who feels like his role as provider for the family is being threatened, criticizes Evelyn and damages some of the prizes she keeps. Their children side with her. Kelly gets angry at Evelyn, and accidentally knocks her over while she is carrying 12 full glass bottles of milk, causing her to nearly sever a ligament. Evelyn is able to talk him down after each incident, and, temporarily at least, he treats her better. As time passes, the older children start moving out for college and participating in sports careers, lessening some burdens on the family.

Evelyn is largely isolated because of the hours she has to spend caring for the children, and the lack of local intellectual equals. However, she is contacted by a group of other contest-entering mid-western housewives and befriends them. Ultimately, Evelyn discovers that Kelly had secretly taken out a second mortgage on their house and never made payments on it, leaving the family subject to an almost-certain foreclosure. The children pray for their mother's miraculous victory in a contest sponsored by Dr Pepper. She wins and pays the mortgage on the house.

Years later, it is revealed that after Kelly died, Evelyn finds out that he has placed his pension checks in a bank account especially for her to make up for all the failures he made as a husband and father. The actual Ryan children are then shown as adults.

== Cast ==
- Julianne Moore as Evelyn Ryan
- Woody Harrelson as Leo "Kelly" Ryan
- Laura Dern as Dortha Schaefer
- Trevor Morgan as Bruce
- Simon Reynolds as Ray the Milkman
- Monte Gagne as Lee Ann Ryan
- Jordan Todosey as Young Tuff Ryan
- Ellary Porterfield as Tuff Ryan

== Critical reception ==
The Prize Winner of Defiance, Ohio received mixed reviews, garnering a 59% approval rating on film review aggregator Rotten Tomatoes, with an average score of 6.10/10, based on 83 reviews. The site's consensus states: "Noteworthy for Julianne Moore's performance, Prize Winner is nonetheless a largely indistinct and tentative film that fails to convey the true power of its bittersweet tale." Metacritic reported a score of 58/100 (citing "mixed or average reviews"), based on reviews from 28 critics.

Roger Ebert of the Chicago Sun-Times gave the film three-and-a-half out of four stars, remarking that the movie "avoids obvious sentiment and predictable emotion, and shows this woman somehow holding it together year after year, entering goofy contests that, for her family, mean life and death".

== Home media ==
The film was released on DVD on March 14, 2006, with DreamWorks taking distribution, instead of their independent banner, Go Fish Pictures, which had theatrical rights to this film.
