= Bruce Shingledecker =

American painter

Bruce Shingledecker (August 9, 1945 – January 8, 2007) was an American painter. He was best known for his acrylic paintings of Alaskan wildlife, some of which included glacial silt in the paint for texture. In addition to painting, he was also a composer and musician.

Shingledecker was born in Defiance, Ohio, where he grew up. Graduating from Defiance High School in 1963, he studied at Defiance College, where he played football. He also studied at the Chicago Academy of Art, after which he taught high school for several years. Shingledecker then volunteered for the United States Peace Corps and was an English instructor at Bansomdet Teachers College (now Ratchaphat University Bansomdet) in Bangkok, Thailand in 1973 and 1974. Following his Peace Corps service, he taught English in Yokohama, Japan, which is where he met his wife, Kazumi.

In the late 1980s Shingledecker moved to Gustavus, Alaska, where he could paint without being disturbed. He received world recognition for his painting "The Sky is Falling" when the National Wildlife Federation chose it for a greeting card.

Bruce Shingledecker died of an apparent heart attack at the age of 61 in 2007, while riding his bicycle down a snowy highway near his home. He was survived by his wife and two brothers.

In 2008 his family donated two of his signed, framed prints to Defiance College and two to the Defiance Public Library.
