= WZOM =

- Defiance, Ohio; United States
- Frequency: 105.7 MHz
- Branding: 105.7 The Bull

Programming
- Format: Country music
- Affiliations: Premiere Networks

Ownership
- Owner: iHeartMedia; (iHM Licenses, LLC)
- Sister stations: WONW, WDFM, WNDH

History
- First air date: August 25, 1989; 36 years ago

Technical information
- Licensing authority: FCC
- Facility ID: 40711
- Class: A
- ERP: 6,000 watts
- HAAT: 100 meters (330 ft)
- Transmitter coordinates: 41°13′23″N 84°22′36″W

Links
- Public license information: Public file; LMS
- Webcast: Listen live (via iHeartRadio)
- Website: www.1057thebull.com

WZOM (105.7 FM) is a radio station broadcasting a country music format. Licensed to Defiance, Ohio, United States, the station is currently owned by iHeartMedia. In February 2002, the station changed from an Oldies format to the current country music format.

== History ==
WZOM signed on the air on August 25, 1989. Its first official programming was a high school football game between Defiance High School and Napoleon High School. The game featured the return of local sports announcer Marv Sebring. Sebring was known for a colorful call of local sports and he had an amazing memory for local sports history.

For the next two days the station ran a tape loop of three oldies, three country and three random songs asking residents to vote for their favorite format. The oldies format was a fan favorite with a three to one margin over other choices. At 6AM on Monday August 28, 1989, the Zoomer kicked off with a "Classic Rock 40" oldies format. The original staff members were Rich Gates, Bob James, Andie Germann as the morning team, Rich Vargo afternoons, Larry Miller in the evenings. Also included in that mix was Jack Goldblatt(Daniels). The remainder of the day was basically music from a syndicated music source but the station was so well programmed that community members would want to visit the on-air personalities that were from Dallas Texas. The transitions were seamless.

The first owner of the station was James Phillips a local insurance man and small town, part-time polka announcer. The corporate name was The Great Wireless Talking Machine, inc. Phillips had hopes of bringing polka music to the air in Defiance. His consultant Chris Cage (WBNS, WBYR) recommended hiring Robert Krouse as general manager. Krouse decided on the oldies format from the start since no local station was programming the format at that time.

Krouse left the station in July 1991 at that time Phillips added talk to part of the programming and within a year sold the station in a distress sale to Richard McBroom owner of WNDH and WONW. Later in 1993 the station was sold to Clear Channel Communications.
