= Alan Francis (horseshoes) =

American horseshoe pitcher

Alan Francis is a horseshoes pitcher from Defiance, Ohio. He has won the World Horseshoe Championship 30 times, in 1989, 1993, 1995–1999, 2001, 2003–2010, 2012–2019 and 2021–2026. Francis holds the record for most championships with 2nd place belonging to Ted Allen, who has won 10. He is also the only player to consistently pitch over 90%, and is regarded by many as the greatest horseshoe pitcher ever. The New York Times wrote that he may be "the most dominant athlete in any sport in the country".

He began competing when he was 9, and before he turned 18 he won a record 4 Junior Boys World Championships, the first of which he won at the age of 12 in 1982. He competed in his first world championship in 1978, held in Des Moines. He has the highest ringer percentage in history, and the most consecutive wins in history.

== Personal life ==
He was raised in Blythedale, Missouri, part of a family of full-time farmers and part-time horseshoe pitchers. His father is Larry Francis. He is married to Amy Brown, a three-time world runner-up, whom he married in 1996. They have a son, Alex Francis, born in 2004.
