= Asel Hagerty =

American soldier in the American Civil War

- Born: June 30, 1837; Canada
- Died: March 30, 1919 (aged 81)
- Burial place: Defiance, Ohio
- Military career
- Allegiance: United States of America
- Branch: United States Army
- Service years: 1864 - 1865
- Rank: Private
- Units: (New York (state)) Company A, 61st New York Volunteer Infantry Regiment
- Conflicts: Battle of Sayler's Creek; American Civil War
- Awards: Medal of Honor

Asel Hagerty (or Asa Hagarty) (June 30, 1837 – March 30, 1919) was an American soldier who fought in the American Civil War. Hagerty received his country's highest award for bravery during combat, the Medal of Honor. Hagerty's medal was won for his capturing a flag at the Battle of Sayler's Creek, Virginia on April 6, 1865. He was honored with the award on May 10, 1865.

Hagerty was born in Canada. He joined the Army from Watertown, New York in August 1864, and mustered out with his regiment in July 1865. Hagerty was buried in Defiance, Ohio.

== Medal of Honor citation ==
The President of the United States of America, in the name of Congress, takes pleasure in presenting the Medal of Honor to Private Asel Hagerty, United States Army, for extraordinary heroism on 6 April 1865, while serving with Company A, 61st New York Infantry, in action at Deatonsville (Sailor's Creek), Virginia, for capture of flag.

== See also ==
- List of American Civil War Medal of Honor recipients: G–L
