= Lima Allen County Airport =

- IATA: AOH; ICAO: KAOH; FAA LID: AOH

Summary
- Airport type: Public
- Owner: Allen County Regional Airport Authority
- Serves: Lima, Ohio
- Elevation AMSL: 975 ft (297 m)
- Coordinates: 40°42′30″N 084°01′39″W

Map
- Location within Ohio Location within the United States

Runways
Direction	Length		Surface
Direction	ft	m	Surface
10/28	6,000	1,829	Asphalt

Statistics (2022)
- Aircraft operations: 32,500
- Based aircraft: 37
- Source: Federal Aviation Administration

Lima Allen County Airport (IATA: AOH, ICAO: KAOH, FAA LID: AOH) is a publicly owned, public use airport located six miles southeast of Lima in Allen County, Ohio, United States. It is owned by the Allen County Regional Airport Authority.

== History ==
Lima's original airport was located a few miles northwest of Lima near the village of Elida. (Note: The original site attempted to compete with the new location, but had closed by 1980. The local television station WLMA would eventually establish a studio in a 6,400-square-foot (590 m^{2}) hangar there.) In November 1958, a bond issue to raise $725,000 to improve the airport with two new paved runways and a terminal building was passed. (Note: It was noted at the time that it was the sole levy of its type to be approved.) The following day, airline service to the airport had to be paused due to high crosswinds – which was taken as justification for the improvements. The county received a nearly $350,000 federal grant in November 1959 to support the project. However, in May 1960, it selected a different 525-acre (212 ha) site to the east of the city, as it was significantly cheaper to purchase. As the 1958 bond issue specified the existing airport location a legal challenge was filed. A judge ruled in favor of the county, but the intended savings failed to materialize. (Note: While the plaintiff was considering whether to file for a retrial, it was alleged the lessor had been charging landing fees in violation of the deed to the land.) A groundbreaking for the facility and its planned 5,150-by-150-foot (1,570 m × 46 m) runway was held in late June 1961. After declining four bids to operate the airport, a U.S. Army Air Force veteran working as the assistant manager of a local Frisch's was hired as an airport manager in June 1962. The airport was dedicated on 3 September 1962.

Lake Central Airlines, which had started service with DC-3s at the old airport in 1954 and continued at the new airport, was maintained by a Civil Aeronautics Board decision in mid 1965. After more than three years without a fixed-base operator, Reed Thompson began running the airport in January 1966.

Northern Airlines planned to start flights from Lima in March 1969. However, after less than a year of service, it was being threatened with eviction due to a failure to pay rent. Shortly after being given a second extension on the deadline, it reorganized and replaced its president. Apollo Aviation, part of the Allegheny Commuter network, began operations at the airport in March 1973. Yet it too ended flights one year later. This marked the first time that the airport lacked scheduled passenger service, as Allegheny Airlines, which had acquired Lake Central, had retired the Convair 580s that were capable of using the runway. The newly renamed Mid-Continent Airlines announced flights from the airport in June 1976. It operated for only two weeks before going defunct. The fixed-base operator went bankrupt in April 1977 and a new one took over in August.

Following a request by the airport authority to the county commissioners, the facility was renamed Lima-Allen County Airport, effective at the start of 1983. Later that year, a contract for the installation of an instrument landing system was awarded. With construction of the ILS nearing completion, the beginning of work on a new three phase master plan was announced in September 1984. Meanwhile, Trans Midwest Airlines began flights from the airport at the start of August 1983. Nevertheless, it became the fourth airline to fail, when it ceased service 18 months later, citing an insufficient number of passengers. In December 1986, Fischer Brothers Aviation was contemplating picking up where Midwest left off.

The airport had been considering extending the runway since at least early 1991, but approval to lengthen it to 6,000 feet (1,800 m) did not come until August 2009.

In 2022, the airport completed a number of projects to improve its facilities. It used COVID-19 funding from the federal government to upgrade its airport lighting system, including the installation of new runway edge lights, taxiway edge lights, runway end identifier lights, and PAPI lights for runway 10; the airport also installed new airport signage and replaced an electrical vault that runs electricity through the airport. The airport also seal coated the runway and taxiway and rehabilitated the apron pavement surface.

== Facilities and aircraft ==
=== Facilities ===
The airport covers 696 acres (282 ha) at an elevation of 975 feet (297 m). Originally, the airport had two runways: 10/28 measures 6,000 by 150 feet (1,829 x 46 m) and is made of asphalt; 14/32, which is now closed, was 3,994 by 150 feet (1,217 x 46 m) and was made of asphalt and grass. Runway 14/32 was closed in the winter months. The grass runway was removed in 2013. Lack of use, the necessary maintenance, and scarce wind alignment were all determining factors involved with its decommissioning.

The airport has a fixed-base operator that sells fuel and offers services such as general maintenance, catering, hangars, courtesy transportation, conference rooms, pilot supplies, a crew lounge, snooze rooms, and a 24-hour terminal.

=== Aircraft ===
In the year ending August 11, 2022, the airport had 32,500 aircraft operations, average 89 per day: 80% general aviation, 18% air taxi, and 2% military. 37 aircraft were then based at this airport: 30 single-engine and 6 multi-engine airplanes as well as 1 jet.

== See also ==
- List of airports in Ohio
