= Terry Ryan (writer) =

American writer

Terry "Tuff" Ryan (July 14, 1946 – May 16, 2007) was an American writer, originally from Defiance, Ohio, who resided in San Francisco for most of her adult life. She was best known for her memoir The Prize Winner of Defiance, Ohio, published in 2001, and subsequent film adaptation released in 2005.

She was born to Leo (nicknamed Kelly) and Evelyn Ryan, and was the sixth of 10 children. The Prize Winner of Defiance, Ohio was a memoir of her life and that of her family, especially her mother, a 1950s housewife with 10 children who provided for the family by winning contests. The book was optioned by DreamWorks SKG and released as a theatrical film in November 2005. It starred Julianne Moore as Evelyn Ryan and Woody Harrelson as Kelly Ryan. Jane Anderson was director and screenwriter. Terry Ryan was a consultant on the film.

With artist Sylvia Mollick, Ryan was also the co-creator of the long-running cartoon T. O. Sylvester in the San Francisco Chronicle. She was married to her long-time partner, Pat Holt, by San Francisco mayor Gavin Newsom on St Valentine's Day 2004. Her account of her wedding, titled We Do!, was published by Chronicle Books.

She graduated from Bowling Green State University.

In 2004, after the film was filmed, Terry learned that she had Stage IV lung cancer that had metastasized to her brain. On May 16, 2007, Terry died of cancer at her San Francisco, California home.
