= Evelyn Ryan =

American poet and writer

Evelyn Ryan (February 15, 1913 – August 29, 1998) was an Ohio poet and jingle and slogan writer. A 2005 movie, The Prize Winner of Defiance, Ohio, was made about her life.

== Early life and education ==
Evelyn Lehman Ryan was born in Sherwood, Ohio in 1913, to Orren and Minnie Lehman; Minnie died soon after giving birth, and Orren sent Ryan and her older sister to live with relatives. She spent her first three years living with an aunt and uncle. She graduated from Sherwood High School in 1931 as valedictorian. She started nursing school, but chronic eczema prevented her from continuing.

== Career ==
Ryan worked as a typesetter and then a columnist at the Sherwood Chronicle, which was published by her step-grandmother, Josephine Etchie.

Ryan was mother of ten and a housewife. She began entering contests in the late 1940s, starting with Burma-Shave rhymes, and regularly won prizes such as watches, kitchen appliances, and in one instance an entire case of candy bars. She often made multiple submissions under slightly different names.

From 1953 to 1965, to support her family she entered contests for writers which in the US in the 1950s and 1960s were created by large commercial products companies as a promotional tool. In 1953, while she was pregnant with her tenth child, the family was being evicted from a two-bedroom house they were renting, and Ryan won enough for the down payment on a four-bedroom house. In 1965, facing foreclosure after her husband had taken a second mortgage on the house without telling her, she won $3,440.64, a Ford Mustang, a trip to Switzerland and two watches, some of which she used to pay off the second mortgage. Ryan also sold poetry and other writing to newspapers, magazines, and radio shows.

Corporations changed to sweepstakes promotions, and Ryan went to work for J.C. Penney as a sales clerk, working there until she retired in 1983.

== Book and movie ==
Her daughter, Terry Ryan, wrote a 2001 book, The Prize Winner of Defiance, Ohio: How My Mother Raised 10 Kids on 25 Words or Less, which was made into a 2005 movie, The Prize Winner of Defiance, Ohio.

== Personal life ==
Ryan married Leo "Kelly" Ryan, a machinist, in 1936. She was widowed in 1983. She died at her home in San Francisco on August 29, 1998.
