= Defiance, Ohio =

- City
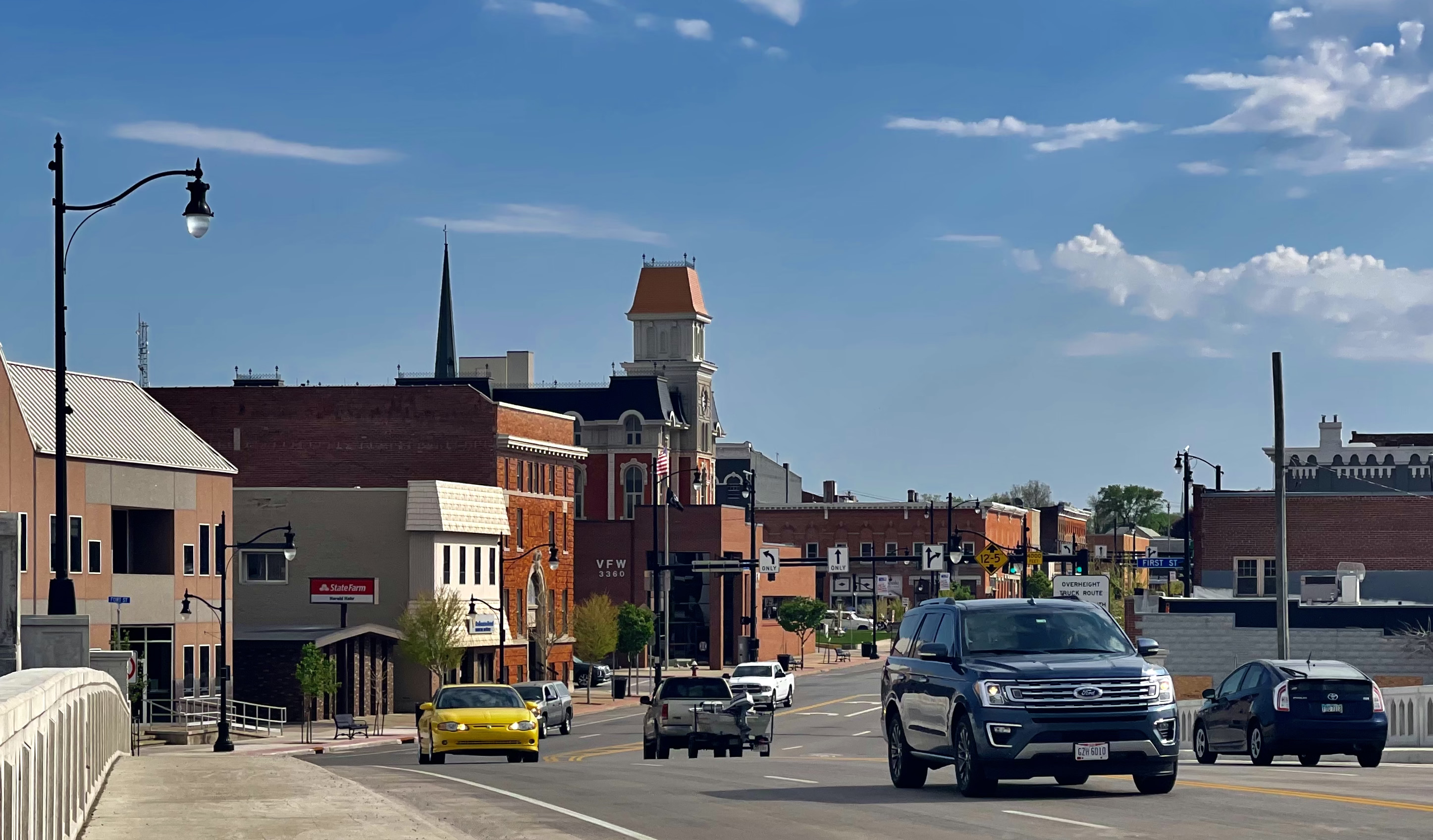
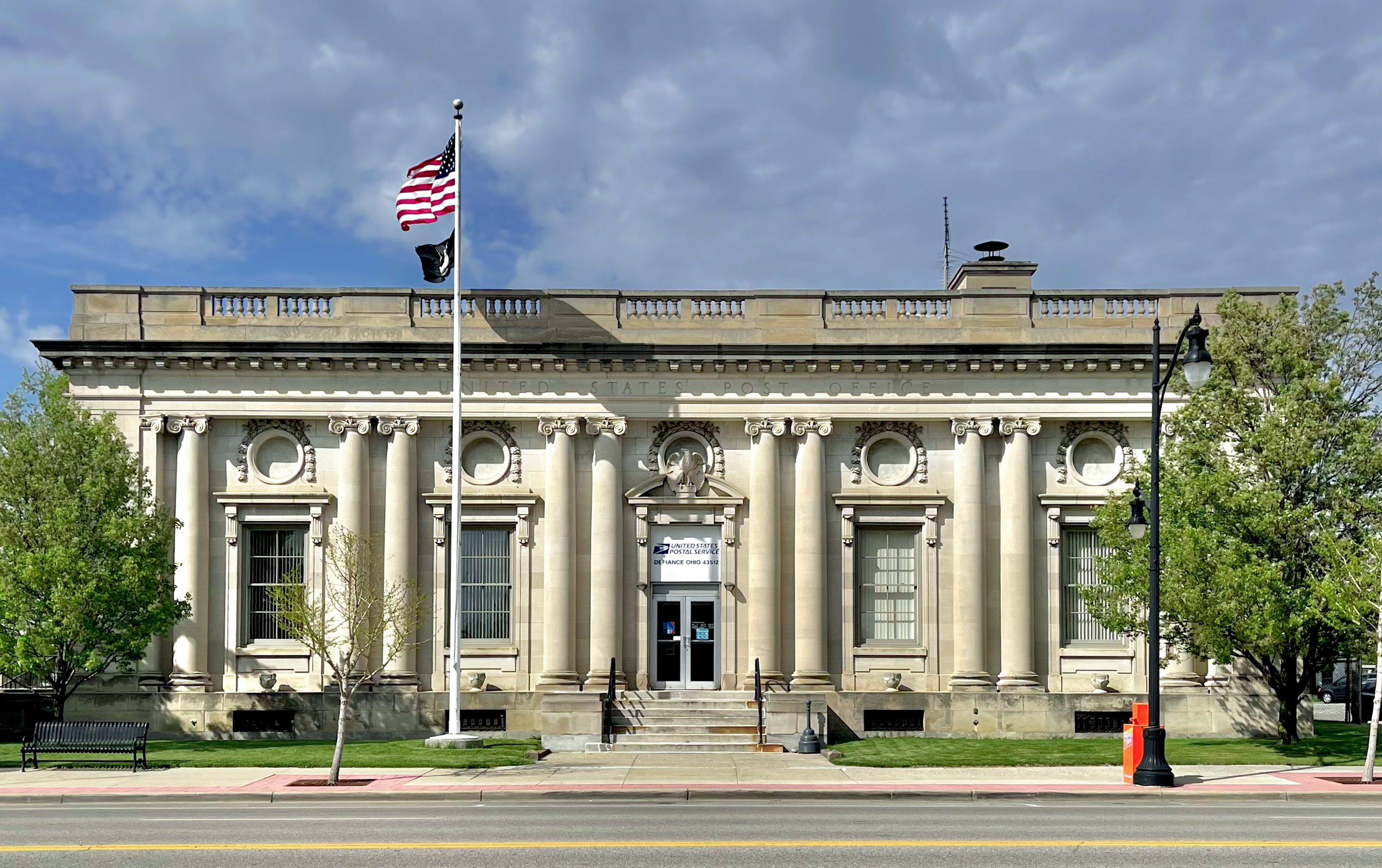
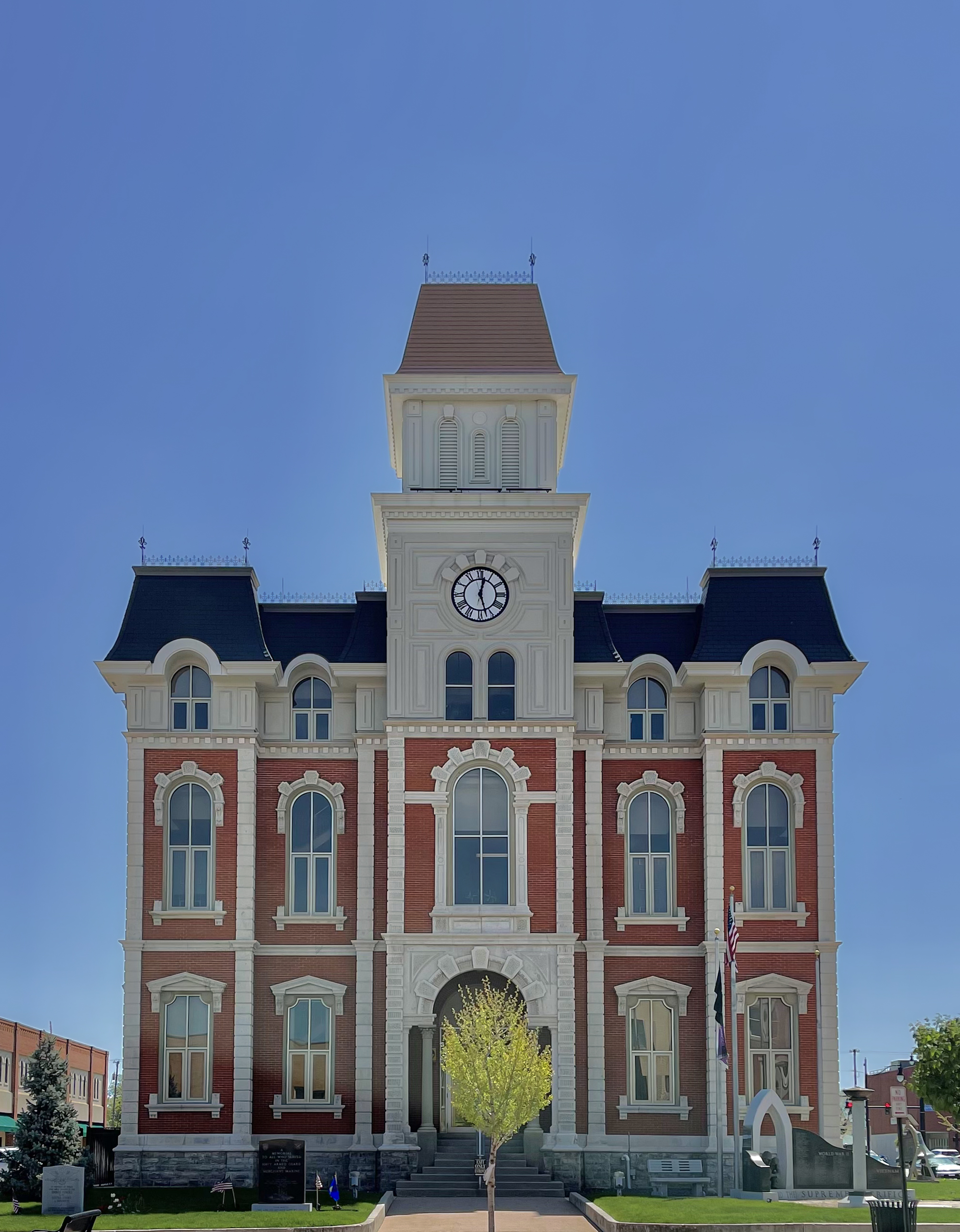
- Top to bottom, left to right: Downtown Defiance, post office of Defiance and Defiance County Courthouse
- Nickname: "Shell Town"
- Motto: "A Great Place to Live"
- Interactive map of Defiance, Ohio
- Location within Ohio Location within the United States
- Coordinates: 41°16′20″N 84°21′56″W
- Country: United States
- State: Ohio
- County: Defiance

Area
  - Total: 13.28 sq mi (34.40 km^{2})
  - Land: 12.79 sq mi (33.12 km^{2})
  - Water: 0.49 sq mi (1.28 km^{2})
- Elevation: 696 ft (212 m)

Population (2020)
  - Total: 17,066
  - Estimate (2023): 17,043
  - Density: 1,334.7/sq mi (515.34/km^{2})
- Time zone: UTC−5 (Eastern (EST))
  - Summer (DST): UTC−4 (EDT)
- ZIP Code: 43512
- Area code: 419
- FIPS code: 39-21308
- GNIS feature ID: 2394492
- Website: City of Defiance, Ohio

Defiance is a city in Defiance County, Ohio, United States, and its county seat. The population was 17,066 at the 2020 census. It is located at the confluence of the Auglaize and Maumee rivers about 55 miles (89 km) southwest of Toledo and 47 miles (76 km) northeast of Fort Wayne, Indiana, in Ohio's northwestern corner.

== History ==
The city contains the site of Fort Defiance, built by General "Mad" Anthony Wayne in August 1794 during the Northwest Indian War. Wayne surveyed the land and declared to General Charles Scott, "I defy the English, Indians, and all the devils of hell to take it." Using the fort as a base of operations, Wayne ordered his troops to destroy Native American crops and villages within a radius of 50 miles (80 km) around the fort. Today a pair of cannons outside the city library on the Maumee River overlook the confluence and mark the location of Fort Defiance, along with a mounded outline of the fort walls. The city was named after Fort Defiance.

From Fort Defiance, the U.S. forces moved northeast along the Maumee River to fight the decisive Battle of Fallen Timbers near the current town of Maumee, Ohio. This victory secured for the United States the Northwest Territory, now the states of Ohio, Michigan, Indiana, Illinois, and Wisconsin.

Fort Winchester was built on the same spot during the War of 1812, but it was a larger fort that extended southward somewhat along the Auglaize River. Historical plaques in the sidewalks mark the full extent of Fort Winchester.

In 1822, Defiance was laid out as a town. In 1845, it was made the county seat of the newly created county, and it became a city in 1881.

== Geography ==
According to the United States Census Bureau, the city has a total area of 12.13 square miles (31.42 km^{2}), of which, 11.62 square miles (30.10 km^{2}) is land and 0.51 square miles (1.32 km^{2}) is water.

Defiance lends its name to a distinct end moraine from the Wisconsin glaciation. As Cushing et al. point out, "The Defiance moraine represents the last notable stand of the glacial front in this region." The moraine varies in width from 2 to 4 miles [3.2 to 6.4 km], and according to Leverett, "it is like a broad wave whose crest stands 20 to 50 feet [6.1 to 15.2 m] above the border of the plain outside it."

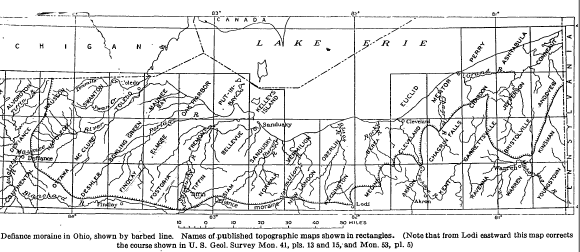
The Defiance Moraine trends across the entire state of Ohio.

=== Climate ===
Climate data for Defiance, Ohio, 1991–2020 normals, extremes 1893–present
Month	Jan	Feb	Mar	Apr	May	Jun	Jul	Aug	Sep	Oct	Nov	Dec	Year
Record high °F (°C)	70 (21)	73 (23)	89 (32)	91 (33)	99 (37)	107 (42)	111 (44)	104 (40)	100 (38)	92 (33)	82 (28)	70 (21)	111 (44)
Mean maximum °F (°C)	54.6 (12.6)	57.0 (13.9)	69.0 (20.6)	79.9 (26.6)	87.8 (31.0)	93.6 (34.2)	94.1 (34.5)	92.3 (33.5)	90.4 (32.4)	82.1 (27.8)	67.8 (19.9)	57.4 (14.1)	96.0 (35.6)
Mean daily maximum °F (°C)	32.3 (0.2)	35.5 (1.9)	46.4 (8.0)	59.9 (15.5)	71.3 (21.8)	80.7 (27.1)	84.6 (29.2)	82.3 (27.9)	76.5 (24.7)	63.3 (17.4)	49.0 (9.4)	37.2 (2.9)	59.9 (15.5)
Daily mean °F (°C)	25.1 (−3.8)	27.6 (−2.4)	37.1 (2.8)	49.1 (9.5)	60.5 (15.8)	70.3 (21.3)	73.9 (23.3)	71.9 (22.2)	65.2 (18.4)	53.0 (11.7)	40.7 (4.8)	30.5 (−0.8)	50.4 (10.2)
Mean daily minimum °F (°C)	17.8 (−7.9)	19.7 (−6.8)	27.8 (−2.3)	38.3 (3.5)	49.7 (9.8)	59.8 (15.4)	63.2 (17.3)	61.5 (16.4)	53.9 (12.2)	42.7 (5.9)	32.4 (0.2)	23.7 (−4.6)	40.9 (4.9)
Mean minimum °F (°C)	−2.9 (−19.4)	2.0 (−16.7)	11.9 (−11.2)	24.8 (−4.0)	36.2 (2.3)	46.8 (8.2)	52.9 (11.6)	51.3 (10.7)	41.2 (5.1)	29.9 (−1.2)	18.9 (−7.3)	6.4 (−14.2)	−6.2 (−21.2)
Record low °F (°C)	−26 (−32)	−22 (−30)	−7 (−22)	4 (−16)	24 (−4)	35 (2)	40 (4)	36 (2)	26 (−3)	14 (−10)	0 (−18)	−19 (−28)	−26 (−32)
Average precipitation inches (mm)	2.59 (66)	2.17 (55)	2.55 (65)	3.67 (93)	4.26 (108)	3.63 (92)	3.66 (93)	3.50 (89)	3.25 (83)	2.87 (73)	3.00 (76)	2.55 (65)	37.70 (958)
Average snowfall inches (cm)	8.7 (22)	8.0 (20)	2.6 (6.6)	0.2 (0.51)	0.0 (0.0)	0.0 (0.0)	0.0 (0.0)	0.0 (0.0)	0.0 (0.0)	0.0 (0.0)	0.9 (2.3)	3.8 (9.7)	24.2 (61.11)
Average precipitation days (≥ 0.01 in)	12.3	9.9	10.7	13.4	13.1	10.8	9.5	9.4	9.1	10.8	11.1	11.6	131.7
Average snowy days (≥ 0.1 in)	5.7	4.4	1.9	0.4	0.0	0.0	0.0	0.0	0.0	0.0	1.0	3.2	16.6
Source 1: NOAA
Source 2: National Weather Service

== Demographics ==
Historical population
Census	Pop.	Note	%±
1850	800		—
1860	1,399		74.9%
1870	2,750		96.6%
1880	5,907		114.8%
1890	7,694		30.3%
1900	7,579		−1.5%
1910	7,327		−3.3%
1920	8,876		21.1%
1930	8,818		−0.7%
1940	9,744		10.5%
1950	11,265		15.6%
1960	14,553		29.2%
1970	16,281		11.9%
1980	16,783		3.1%
1990	16,768		−0.1%
2000	16,465		−1.8%
2010	16,494		0.2%
2020	17,066		3.5%
2023 (est.)	17,043		−0.1%
U.S. Decennial Census

=== 2020 census ===
As of the 2020 census, Defiance had a population of 17,066. The median age was 39.7 years. 22.8% of residents were under the age of 18 and 20.5% of residents were 65 years of age or older. For every 100 females there were 94.1 males, and for every 100 females age 18 and over there were 90.9 males age 18 and over.

98.7% of residents lived in urban areas, while 1.3% lived in rural areas.

There were 7,153 households in Defiance, of which 27.7% had children under the age of 18 living in them. Of all households, 41.1% were married-couple households, 20.2% were households with a male householder and no spouse or partner present, and 30.7% were households with a female householder and no spouse or partner present. About 33.1% of all households were made up of individuals and 14.2% had someone living alone who was 65 years of age or older.

There were 7,661 housing units, of which 6.6% were vacant. The homeowner vacancy rate was 1.4% and the rental vacancy rate was 6.5%.

Racial composition as of the 2020 census
Race	Number	Percent
White	13,964	81.8%
Black or African American	557	3.3%
American Indian and Alaska Native	71	0.4%
Asian	88	0.5%
Native Hawaiian and Other Pacific Islander	12	0.1%
Some other race	999	5.9%
Two or more races	1,375	8.1%
Hispanic or Latino (of any race)	2,780	16.3%

=== American Community Survey (2018–2022) ===
According to 2018–2022 census data, 90.6% of persons age 25 years or higher had an education level of high school graduate or higher. 20.2% of persons age 25 years or higher reported having a Bachelor's degree or higher.

The 2018–2022 U.S. Census Bureau American Community Survey (ACS) median income for households (in 2022 dollars) was $58,750. 14.6% of the population was below the poverty line. 8.5% of persons under age 65 years were without health insurance.

The median value of owner-occupied housing units (2018–2022) was $135,800. Median gross rent (2018–2022) was $809.

=== 2010 census ===
As of the census of 2010, there were 16,494 people, 6,663 households, and 4,291 families living in the city. The population density was 1,419.4 inhabitants per square mile (548.0/km^{2}). There were 7,435 housing units at an average density of 639.8 per square mile (247.0/km^{2}). The racial makeup of the city was 88.1% White, 3.6% African American, 0.3% Native American, 0.4% Asian, 4.8% from other races, and 2.8% from two or more races. Hispanic or Latino people of any race were 14.4% of the population.

There were 6,663 households, of which 31.4% had children under the age of 18 living with them, 45.3% were married couples living together, 13.9% had a female householder with no husband present, 5.3% had a male householder with no wife present, and 35.6% were non-families. 29.4% of all households were made up of individuals, and 11.5% had someone living alone who was 65 years of age or older. The average household size was 2.38 and the average family size was 2.91.

The median age in the city was 37.1 years. 24.1% of residents were under the age of 18; 10.9% were between the ages of 18 and 24; 23.7% were from 25 to 44; 26% were from 45 to 64; and 15.3% were 65 years of age or older. The gender makeup of the city was 48.3% male and 51.7% female.

=== 2000 census ===
As of the census of 2000, there were 16,465 people, 6,572 households, and 4,422 families living in the city. The population density was 1,562.4 inhabitants per square mile (603.2/km^{2}). There were 7,061 housing units at an average density of 670.0 per square mile (258.7/km^{2}). The racial makeup of the city was 87.15% White, 3.44% African American, 0.32% Native American, 0.39% Asian, 0.05% Pacific Islander, 6.50% from other races, and 2.15% from two or more races. Hispanic or Latino people of any race were 12.75% of the population.

There were 6,572 households, out of which 33.0% had children under the age of 18 living with them, 50.2% were married couples living together, 12.6% had a female householder with no husband present, and 32.7% were non-families. 27.6% of all households were made up of individuals, and 10.3% had someone living alone who was 65 years of age or older. The average household size was 2.43 and the average family size was 2.95.

In the city the population was composed of 25.7% under the age of 18, 11.1% from 18 to 24, 26.8% from 25 to 44, 22.9% from 45 to 64, and 13.6% 65 years of age or older. The median age was 35 years. For every 100 females, there were 94.1 males. For every 100 females age 18 and over, there were 90.1 males.

The median income for households was $41,670, and the median income for a family was $49,599. Males had a median income of $37,322, compared to $23,938 for females. The per capita income for the city was $19,790. About 7.4% of families and 8.8% of the population were below the poverty line, including 12.0% of those under age 18 and 7.1% of those age 65 or over.

== Parks and recreation ==
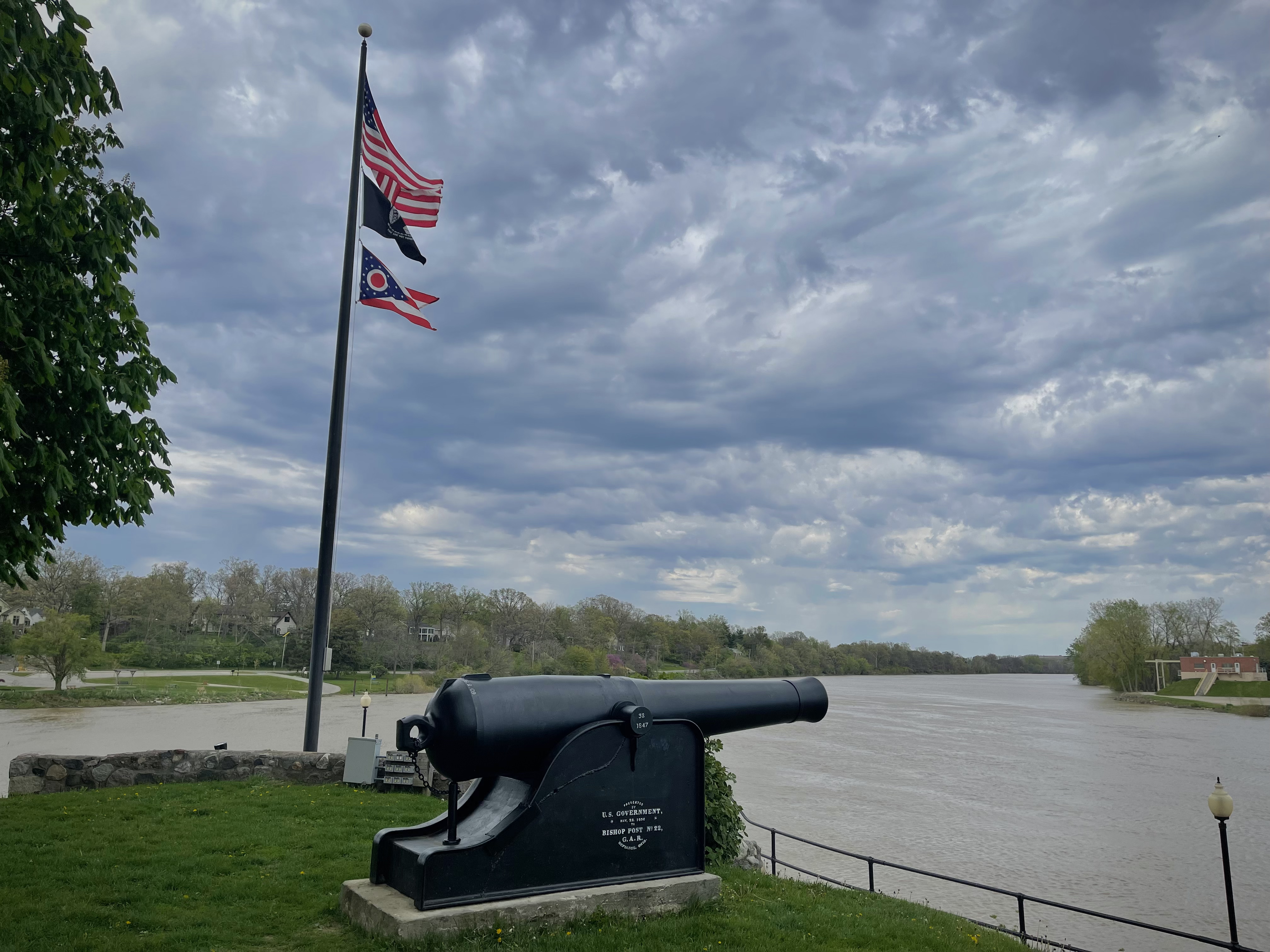
Park at the site of Fort Defiance

Defiance has several city parks that offer a variety of recreational activities, including baseball and softball diamonds, as well as playground equipment. These parks include Kingsbury Park and Diehl Park. Kingsbury Park also has a public swimming pool.

Independence Dam State Park, 4 miles east of the city on State Highway 424, along the Maumee River, is also a popular recreational site for area residents. The park provides picnic facilities, nature trails, and fishing. There is a reservoir with adjacent trails, along with a track up top. There is also a Frisbee golf course. On the other side, there is a dog park.

Fort Defiance Park is a park that currently occupies the site of the former Fort Defiance. In 1980, the park was added to the National Register of Historic Places.

== Education ==
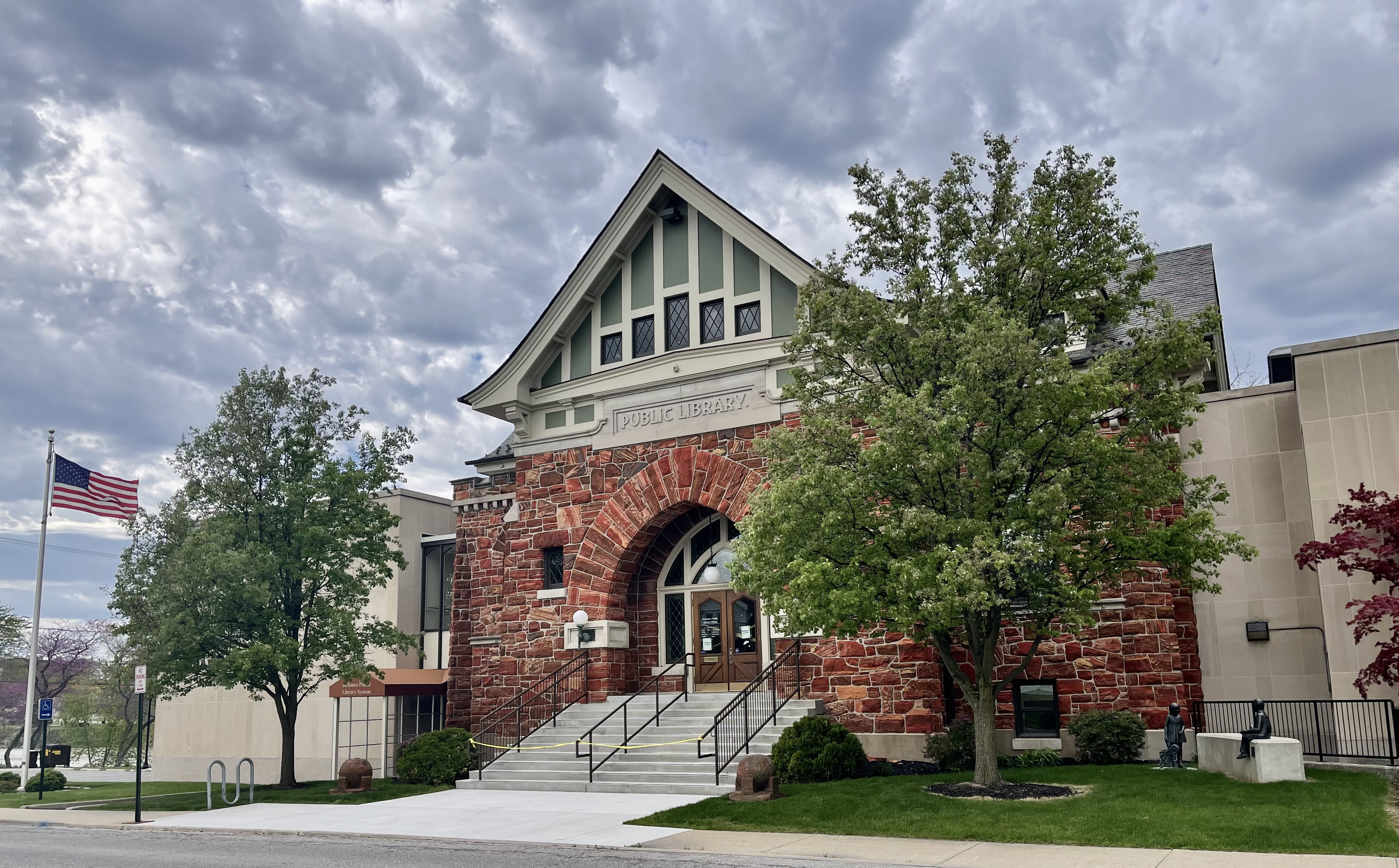
Public library in Defiance

The Defiance City Schools school district provides public K-12 education for the majority of the city limits. The Northeastern Local Schools school district (which operates Tinora) includes outerlying portions of the city limits, but it is a smaller school district.

Schools maintained by local Lutheran and Catholic churches also provide preschool-grade 8 education.

There are three high schools in the Defiance area: Defiance (located in Defiance), Tinora (part of Northeastern Local Schools) and Ayersville High Schools. Tinora and Ayersville High Schools are located a few miles from the main city and serve the rural areas of Defiance County to the northeast and southeast, respectively, of Defiance.

Defiance College is a small liberal arts college affiliated with the United Church of Christ and has an enrollment of about 1,000 students. Defiance College is a member of the NAIA and can give scholarships out to its athletes.

Defiance has a public library, a branch of the Defiance Public Library System.

== Media ==
=== Newspaper ===
- The Crescent-News

=== Radio ===
- WONW, 1280 AM, news-talk
- WDFM, 98.1 FM, "Hot AC"
- WZOM, 105.7 FM "The Bull", country

=== Television ===
- WNHO-LD channel 44, repeater of WLMA, Lima, Ohio

== Infrastructure ==
=== Transportation ===
The Defiance Memorial Airport is located four nautical miles (4.6 mi; 7.4 km) northwest of Defiance's central business district.

== Notable people ==
- Kevin Bacon, Ohio Senator
- Doug Bair, pitcher for seven Major League Baseball teams
- Chad Billingsley, pitcher for the Los Angeles Dodgers
- Michelle Burke, television and film actress
- Wild Bill Davison, jazz cornet player
- Alene Duerk, first female admiral in the U.S. Navy
- Alan Francis, champion horseshoe thrower
- Chet Grant, football player and journalist
- Asel Hagerty (1837–1919), Canadian-born Medal of Honor recipient in the American Civil War
- Jessicka Havok, professional wrestler
- Michael Hitchcock, actor, comedian, screenwriter, and television producer
- Greg Kampe, men's head basketball coach at Oakland University
- Sarah Kurtz, materials scientist and member of the National Academy of Engineering
- Don Miller, one of the Four Horsemen of Notre Dame
- Ray T. Miller, 43rd Mayor of Cleveland
- Jon Niese, pitcher for the Pittsburgh Pirates
- Jason Osborne, majority leader for New Hampshire House of Representatives
- Chad Reineke, pitcher for the Cincinnati Reds
- Evelyn Ryan, jingle writer
- Terry "Tuff" Ryan, author
- Bruce Shingledecker, Alaskan wildlife painter
- H. Allen Smith, humorist
- Scott Taylor, pitcher for the Boston Red Sox
- Walter W. Wensinger, lieutenant general in the Marine Corps during World War II

== See also ==
- Military Order of the Serpent
