= Sherwood, Defiance County, Ohio =

Sherwood, Ohio
- Village
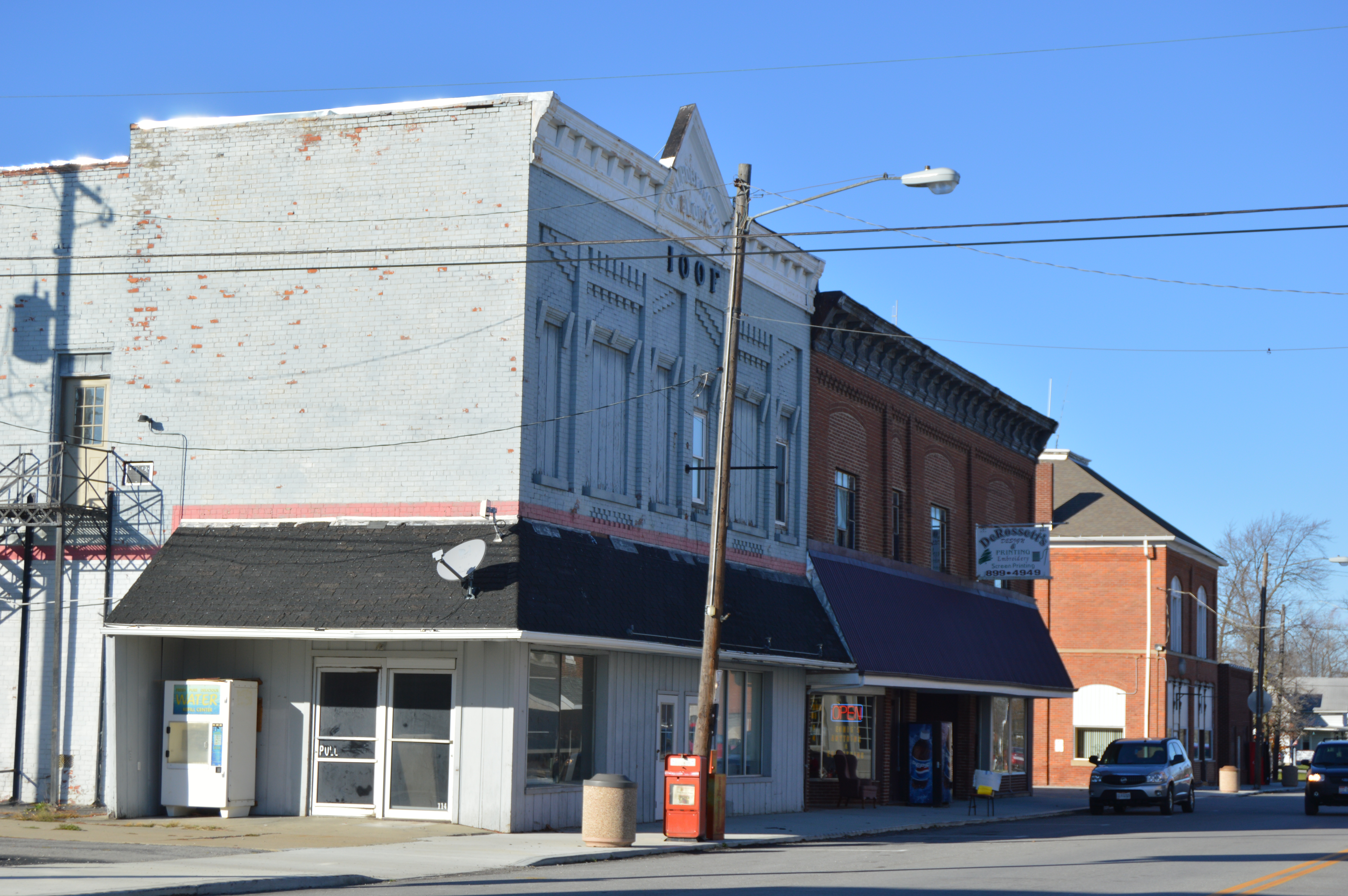
- Harrison Street downtown

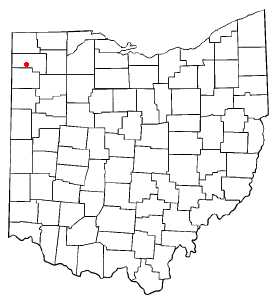
- Location of Sherwood, Defiance County, Ohio

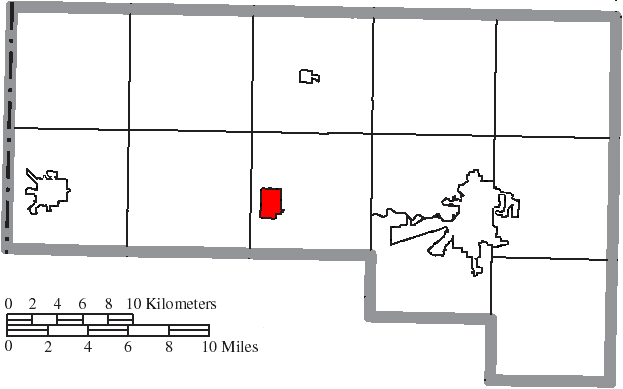
- Location of Sherwood in Defiance County
- Coordinates: 41°17′20″N 84°33′11″W
- Country: United States
- State: Ohio
- County: Defiance

Area
  - Total: 1.57 sq mi (4.07 km^{2})
  - Land: 1.56 sq mi (4.03 km^{2})
  - Water: 0.015 sq mi (0.04 km^{2})
- Elevation: 705 ft (215 m)

Population (2020)
  - Total: 802
  - Density: 514.8/sq mi (198.78/km^{2})
- Time zone: UTC-5 (Eastern (EST))
  - Summer (DST): UTC-4 (EDT)
- ZIP code: 43556
- Area code: 419
- FIPS code: 39-72256
- GNIS feature ID: 2399805
- Website: https://sherwoodohio.gov/

Sherwood is a village in Defiance County, Ohio, United States. The population was 802 at the 2020 census.

== History ==
Sherwood was platted in the 1870s when the railroad was extended to that point. The village was named for Isaac R. Sherwood, a member of the United States House of Representatives from Ohio.

== Geography ==
According to the United States Census Bureau, the village has a total area of 1.49 square miles (3.86 km^{2}), of which 1.47 square miles (3.81 km^{2}) is land and 0.02 square miles (0.05 km^{2}) is water.

== Demographics ==
Historical population
Census	Pop.	Note	%±
1880	195		—
1900	455		—
1910	566		24.4%
1920	543		−4.1%
1930	521		−4.1%
1940	554		6.3%
1950	570		2.9%
1960	578		1.4%
1970	784		35.6%
1980	915		16.7%
1990	828		−9.5%
2000	801		−3.3%
2010	827		3.2%
2020	802		−3.0%
U.S. Decennial Census

=== 2010 census ===
As of the census of 2010, there were 827 people, 327 households, and 226 families residing in the village. The population density was 562.6 inhabitants per square mile (217.2/km^{2}). There were 356 housing units at an average density of 242.2 per square mile (93.5/km^{2}). The racial makeup of the village was 96.7% White, 0.4% African American, 0.2% Native American, 0.1% Asian, 0.8% from other races, and 1.7% from two or more races. Hispanic or Latino of any race were 4.8% of the population.

There were 327 households, of which 35.5% had children under the age of 18 living with them, 50.8% were married couples living together, 12.8% had a female householder with no husband present, 5.5% had a male householder with no wife present, and 30.9% were non-families. 26.9% of all households were made up of individuals, and 13.2% had someone living alone who was 65 years of age or older. The average household size was 2.53 and the average family size was 3.04.

The median age in the village was 36 years. 28.4% of residents were under the age of 18; 6.6% were between the ages of 18 and 24; 25.7% were from 25 to 44; 23.8% were from 45 to 64; and 15.6% were 65 years of age or older. The gender makeup of the village was 46.9% male and 53.1% female.

=== 2000 census ===
As of the census of 2000, there were 801 people, 301 households, and 227 families residing in the village. The population density was 554.4 inhabitants per square mile (214.1/km^{2}). There were 315 housing units at an average density of 218.0 per square mile (84.2/km^{2}). The racial makeup of the village was 96.00% White, 0.75% African American, 0.37% Native American, 1.87% from other races, and 1.00% from two or more races. Hispanic or Latino of any race were 3.50% of the population.

There were 301 households, out of which 34.6% had children under the age of 18 living with them, 60.8% were married couples living together, 10.3% had a female householder with no husband present, and 24.3% were non-families. 21.3% of all households were made up of individuals, and 9.6% had someone living alone who was 65 years of age or older. The average household size was 2.66 and the average family size was 3.04.

In the village, the population was spread out, with 27.3% under the age of 18, 8.5% from 18 to 24, 29.5% from 25 to 44, 22.2% from 45 to 64, and 12.5% who were 65 years of age or older. The median age was 36 years. For every 100 females there were 89.8 males. For every 100 females age 18 and over, there were 90.8 males.

The median income for a household in the village was $39,135, and the median income for a family was $42,188. Males had a median income of $32,130 versus $23,500 for females. The per capita income for the village was $16,212. About 10.9% of families and 12.5% of the population were below the poverty line, including 14.7% of those under age 18 and 17.3% of those age 65 or over.

== Education ==
Sherwood has a public library, a branch of the Defiance Public Library System.

== Notable people ==
- Evelyn Ryan, jingle writer
