= Terence Ryan (musician) =

American musician

- Years active: 2015–present
- Labels: 3QTR, Kobalt

Terence Ryan is a Los Angeles-based producer, singer, songwriter, instrumentalist, and engineer.

== Life and career ==
=== Early life – 2015 ===
Ryan was born in Boston and raised by working-class parents on the South Shore (Massachusetts). Not having any family members to introduce him to music, Ryan found an old keyboard that he played every day. He soon became self-taught, having also learned how to play piano, drums, guitar, and bass. By learning to play the guitar and piano, and experimenting with his laptop and BitTorrent, Ryan found his musical influences – which include Kanye West, Coldplay, Blink-182 – and honed his sound.

Ryan left his industrial warehouse job in Pembroke and headed west. Working odd jobs, couch surfing, and eventually living in his car, he would record the vocals and instrumentals on his laptop in parking lots, campgrounds, and anywhere that he could. "I so wasn't there, like, consciously. I think my subconscious was just... wanted so bad to just be a professional musician, so that's the only thing I could resort to. It was the only thing I had at the time. I didn't have money, I didn't have a place to stay, I didn't have work. So music was the only thing that I had," said Ryan.

=== 2016–2017 ===
Ryan headed back east in the fall of 2016 to piece together the recordings from his time out west for his debut LP, Don't Panic, set to release June 23, 2017. He returned home to what was once a harder household, to one he says is now "fully recovered" and a source of inspiration for him. Don't Panic is inspired by the struggles Ryan faced growing up, as well as past experiences.

In May 2017, Ryan released the single and music video for "Mean It" which was featured on Spotify's 'New Music Friday' playlist and exposed to the playlist's 2 million followers. Ryan's single, "To Live And Die In New England" was also released with an accompanying music video in June 2017.

=== Discography ===
Title	Release year	Release type
Don't Panic	2017	Album
Will Word and Hand	2015	Album
Mean It	2017	Single
To Live And Die in New England	2017	Single
