= WLMA (TV) =

Television station in Lima, Ohio

WLMA and WTLW-CD

Lima, Ohio; United States
- Channels for WLMA: Digital: 4 (VHF); Virtual: 44
- Channels for WTLW-CD: Digital: 17 (UHF); Virtual: 44
- Branding: WLMA TV 44

Programming
- Affiliations: 44.1: Religious Independent; 44.2: West Ohio Sports Network

Ownership
- Owner: WLMA: Marquee Broadcasting; (Marquee Broadcasting Ohio, Inc.)
- Operator: of WLMA, owner of WTLW-CD: American Christian Television Services, Inc.

History
- First air date: WLMA: June 13, 1982; WTLW-CD: December 23, 1997
- Former call signs: WLMA: WTLW (1981–2022); WTLW-CD: W61CZ (1997–2009); W23DE-D (2009–2018); WOIW-LD (2018–2022); WTLW-LD (2022–2026)
- Former channel number: WLMA: Analog: 44 (UHF, 1982–2008); Digital: 47 (UHF, 2008–2009), 44 (UHF, 2009–2019); WTLW-CD: Analog: 61 (UHF, 1997–2009); Digital: 23 (UHF, 2009–2019)

Technical information
- Licensing authority: FCC
- Facility ID: WLMA: 1222; WTLW-CD: 74373
- Class: WTLW-CD: LD
- ERP: WLMA: 10 kW; WTLW-CD: 15 kW
- HAAT: WLMA: 207 m (679 ft); WTLW-CD: 149.6 m (491 ft)
- Transmitter coordinates: WLMA: 40°45′47″N 84°11′1″W; WTLW-CD: 40°45′47″N 84°11′1″W
- Translators: WOHW-LD (26 UHF, Lima)

Links
- Public license information: WLMA: Public file; LMS; WTLW-CD: Public file; LMS
- Website: actsministries.com

WLMA (channel 44) is a religious/secular independent television station in Lima, Ohio, United States. It is owned by Marquee Broadcasting, which maintains a local marketing agreement (LMA) with American Christian Television Services, the station's previous owner. WLMA's studios and transmitter are located on Baty Road northwest of the city.

WTLW-CD (UHF channel 17, owned outright by American Christian Television Services, and also mapped to virtual channel 44) in Lima operates as a translator of WLMA.

American Christian Television Services should not be confused with the American Christian Television System, a defunct television network, or Associated Christian Television System, which owns WACX in Orlando, Florida.

== History ==
WLMA has its roots in Christian radio station WTGN-FM, also in Lima. In 1976, WTGN solicited its listeners for seed money for a new television station. Before the station received FCC approval, however, WTGN opted not to own nor operate the new station, and the people behind the drive to get channel 44 on the air decided to incorporate as "American Christian Television Services, Inc."

The station chose a hangar at the former site of Lima Allen County Airport on Baty Road near Elida, northwest of Lima, to build a studio. The new studios, measuring 80 by 80 feet (24 by 24 m), was believed by the station founders to be the largest television studio in Northwest Ohio. The hangar was converted into a television studio in 1980, through the efforts of volunteers.

On June 13, 1982, the station signed on the air as WTLW.

In 1988, the station expanded its focus from religious broadcasts to incorporate full length broadcasts of local high school basketball games. Eventually, football games were added as well. In the fall of 2010, WTLW launched a 24-hour all-sports network on its digital subchannel, 44.2. The station was called "WOSN", standing for West Ohio Sports Network.

WOSN now covers 70 schools and several colleges and airs hundreds of full length sporting events throughout the year. WOSN is also home to several sports related shows—The Sports Report, Big Sports Weekend, Buckeye Insider and Marks Madness. The majority of games aired on WOSN are football and basketball contests, but soccer, volleyball, tennis, swimming, softball, baseball, track, bowling and even Soap Box Derby racing have been featured.

As a result of the 600 MHz spectrum auction, WTLW was required to move to low-VHF channel 4. The station then moved a low-power translator (WTLW-LD) to its main tower as a nested translator to broadcast on UHF 17 at 15 kW of power, and became the temporary originating station for its signals (with virtual channel 44) while WTLW moved frequencies. The station changed its call sign to WLMA on October 13, 2022, with WOIW-LD changing its call sign to WTLW-LD on October 17.

== Programming ==
WLMA runs infomercials and religious programming before 5 p.m.; and family dramas, first-run talk shows, family movies, local sports programming, and reality shows after 5 p.m.

== Subchannels ==
Shared subchannels of WLMA and WTLW-CD
Channel		Res.	Short name	Programming
WLMA	WTLW-CD	Res.	Short name	Programming
44.3	44.1	720p	WLMA	Main WLMA programming
44.4	44.2	720p	WOSN	West Ohio Sports Network
44.7	44.5	480i	NEWSMX2	Newsmax2
