= Christopher Grimm =

American screenwriter

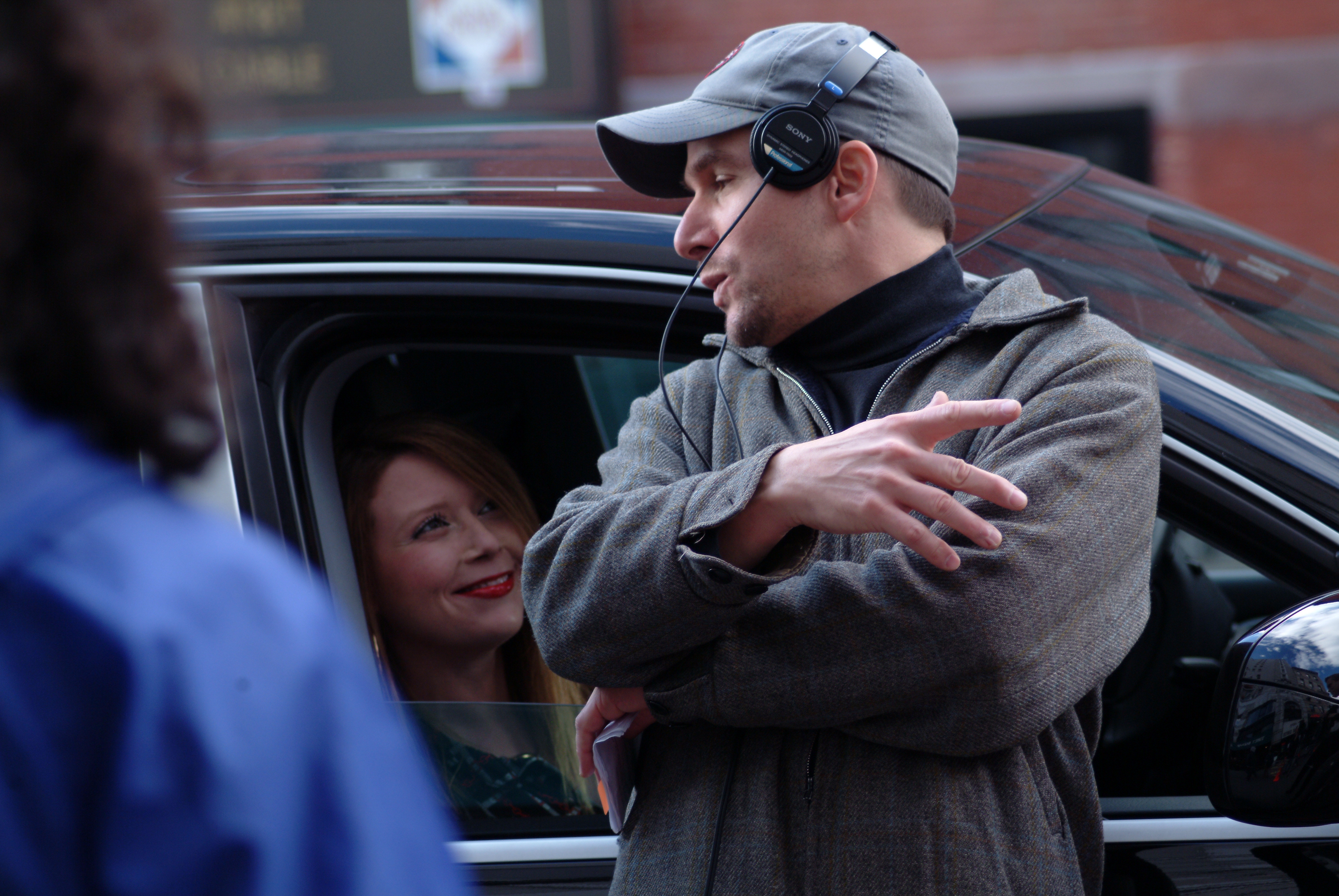
Christopher Grimm directing Natasha Lyonne on the set of Goyband

Christopher Grimm is a New York City-based writer-director and actor. He wrote, produced, directed and starred in a series of TV promos and movie trailers for the Independent Film Channel based on The Bystander from Hell, a character he created in a 3-minute short shot on one roll of Super-8 film. The Bystander persona was a compilation of onlookers he dealt with while working crowd control as a production assistant on films and TV shows in Los Angeles and New York City. The Bystander From Hell played at over 50 film festivals, including Sundance and Toronto. Prior to that, he co-starred, co-wrote and co-produced Two Boneheads, which won an award at the Szene Salzburg Festival and aired on a PBS series hosted by Jeffrey Lyons.

Later, he directed, co-wrote and acted in the short comedy Looking for Dubinsky with David Fuhrer playing 4 eccentric Lower East Siders, and then directed and co-wrote Goyband, which was his feature-film debut. Goyband is a musical comedy set in the Catskills starring Natasha Lyonne, Zoe Lister-Jones, Adam Pascal, Amy Davidson, Tovah Feldshuh, Tibor Feldman, Cris Judd, Dean Edwards, Wendy Diamond and CBS Travel Editor Peter Greenberg, and distributed by MarVista Entertainment. Goyband won Best Director and Best Comedy at the Long Island Film Festival.

As a screenwriter he has worked with directors such as Davis Guggenheim and Alan Rudolph and actors John C. Reilly, Elisabeth Shue, William H. Macy, Tim Blake Nelson, and Robert John Burke. In addition to writing several award-winning short films, writing credits include the feature-length films Rhythm Thief - winner of numerous festival awards, including a Sundance Jury Prize, First Prize at the New Orleans, Florida and SXSW Film Festivals; Spare Me (winner of the Avignon Prix Tournage) and the documentary Calling the Ghosts, executive produced by Julia Ormond and winner of 2 Emmy Awards & a Cable Ace Award; and winner of the Human Rights Watch Film Festival and Chicago International Film Festival.
