= DreamWorks Tours: Shrek's Adventure! =

Midway attraction operated by Merlin Entertainments in County Hall, London

County Hall, London
- Coordinates: 51°30′7″N 0°7′8″W
- Status: Operating
- Opening date: July 2015

Ride statistics
- Attraction type: 4D ride Walkthrough
- Theme: Shrek

DreamWorks Tours: Shrek's Adventure! (commonly referred to as Shrek's Adventure!) is a tourist attraction located in the County Hall building, London. It is a Midway attraction operated by Merlin Entertainments. The tour is named after Universal Pictures and DreamWorks Animation Studios franchise Shrek.

This "Immersive Tunnel" from Simworx is built in collaboration with Merlin Entertainments. The 20,000 square feet (1,900 m^{2}) live interactive walk-through adventure presents an original story written by DreamWorks Animation, along with a character courtyard, also featuring characters from several other DreamWorks Animations franchises.

== The Experience ==
Guests board a magic bus in order to visit the world of Shrek. The guests then enter a 4D ride where they meet various DreamWorks characters, including the Penguins of Madagascar and Toothless.

Donkey proceeds to land in Shrek's swamp, unintentionally crushing the witch Griselda in the process. Guests then leave the bus and meet Cinderella. Guests then find Rumpelstiltskin's carriage, where they meet a fortune teller who helps them escape the witches.

Along the adventure, guests encounter various show scenes and interact with certain characters. These include a trip to the Poison Apple, where guests meet Doris and Puss in Boots and take shelter from the withes. The guests then find themselves in Farquaad's dungeon, now run by Thelonious. Pinocchio is being held captive, and in order to free him, guests must answer three questions correctly.

The guests then run through a mirror maze, only to encounter Sleeping Beauty. She will try to tell guests where to find the Muffin Man. The Muffin Man shows the guests a big pot that can help bring them back home. The guests expect to go home, but find themselves in a prison, where Fiona and Shrek help them escape.

At the end, there are multiple photo opportunities with various Shrek and DreamWorks characters, and there is a gift shop.

== See also ==
- Legoland Windsor Resort
- Legoland Discovery Centre
- Universal Studios Great Britain
