= Kevin Corrigan =

American actor (born 1969)

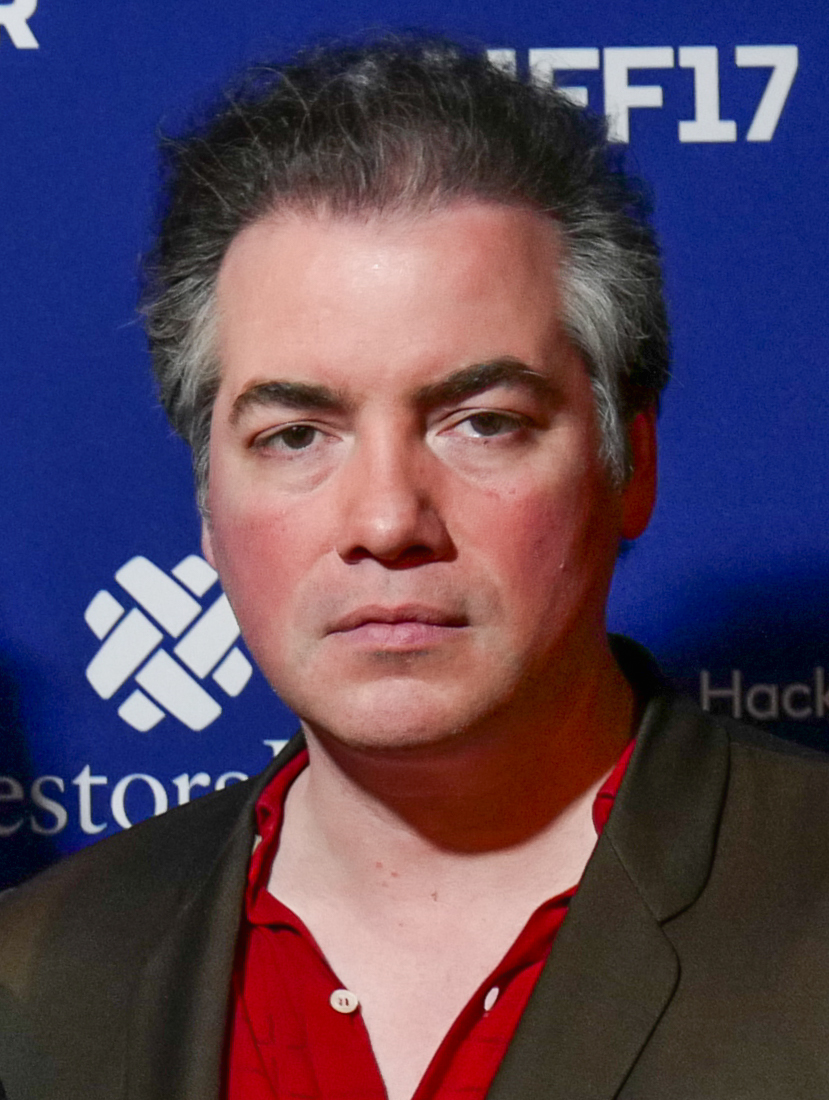
- Corrigan at the 2017 Montclair Film Festival
- Born: March 27, 1969 (age 57); New York City, U.S.
- Education: Lee Strasberg Theatre and Film Institute
- Occupation: Actor
- Years active: 1989–present
- Spouse: Elizabeth Berridge (m. 2001)
- Children: 1

Kevin Corrigan (born March 27, 1969) is an American character actor. He has appeared mostly in independent films and television since the 1990s, including as Uncle Eddie on the sitcom Grounded for Life (2001–2005). His film appearances include supporting roles in Goodfellas (1990), Rhythm Thief (1994), Bad Boys (1995), Walking and Talking (1996), Henry Fool (1997), The Departed (2006), Superbad (2007), Pineapple Express (2008), Seven Psychopaths (2012), The King of Staten Island (2020), and co-starring roles in Big Fan (2009) and Results (2015). He has been twice nominated for the Independent Spirit Award for Best Supporting Male. In 2026, he appeared in the 4th season of Reacher.

== Early life ==
Corrigan was born and raised in the Bronx borough of New York City.

== Career ==
After studying at Lee Strasberg Theatre and Film Institute, he made his film debut in 1989 in Lost Angels, starring Donald Sutherland and Adam Horovitz. He was cast in Goodfellas as the younger brother of Henry Hill (Ray Liotta). During the independent film boom of the 1990s, Corrigan built a career playing quirky, unconventional characters in films such as True Romance, Living in Oblivion, Walking and Talking and Rhythm Thief. He made his television series debut as a cast member of the short-lived Rhea Perlman sitcom Pearl. He also appeared in the video for "Get Me" by the indie band Dinosaur Jr. in 1993.

Corrigan became well known for his role as the slacker Eddie Finnerty on the sitcom Grounded for Life, which ran for five seasons. After the show's cancellation, he returned to appearing in smaller film projects, with the exception of a role in Martin Scorsese's The Departed as the drug-dealing cousin of Leonardo DiCaprio's character. Since that film's success, he has appeared more regularly in high-profile films. He had roles in two Judd Apatow-produced films: Superbad, as the violent owner of the house where Jonah Hill's and Michael Cera's characters attempt to steal alcohol, and Pineapple Express, as one of the main villain's henchmen. He also appeared in Ridley Scott's American Gangster as an informant for Russell Crowe's character. Corrigan was also in the movie The Last Winter, as Motor, a mechanic. In 2009 he was in the Oscar-winning short film The New Tenants and guested on the science fiction drama Fringe as Sam Weiss. He played Sal in the critically praised independent film Big Fan, written and directed by Robert D. Siegel. In 2010, Corrigan starred in the John Landis-produced thriller Some Guy Who Kills People, directed by Jack Perez, and appeared in Tony Scott's Unstoppable. In 2015, he co-starred with Guy Pearce in Results, writer-director Andrew Bujalski's fifth feature film.

== Filmography ==
=== Film ===
Year	Title	Role	Notes
1989	Lost Angels	Gata	
1990	The Exorcist III	Altar Boy	
1990	Men Don't Leave	Mike	
1990	Goodfellas	Michael Hill	
1991	One Good Cop	Clifford	
1991	Billy Bathgate	Arnold	
1992	Zebrahead	Dominic	
1992	Jumpin' at the Boneyard	Morty	
1993	True Romance	Marvin	
1993	The Saint of Fort Washington	Peter	
1994	Family Remains	Max	Short film
1994	American Standoff	The Guy	Short film
1994	The Last Good Time	Frank	
1994	Rhythm Thief	Fuller	
1995	An Eviction Notice		Short film
1995	Living in Oblivion	Assistant Camera	
1995	Bad Boys	Elliot	
1995	Kiss of Death	Kid Selling Infinity	
1995	Drunks	Cam	
1996	Bandwagon	Wynn Knapp	Gijón International Film Festival – Special Jury Award
1996	Walking and Talking	Bill	Nominated—Independent Spirit Award for Best Supporting Male
1996	The Pallbearer	A Pallbearer	
1996	Trees Lounge	Matthew	
1996	Illtown	Francis (Cisco)	
1997	Kicked in the Head	Redmond	Co-writer
1997	Revelation		Short film
1997	Henry Fool	Warren	
1998	Buffalo '66	Rocky the Goon	Uncredited
1998	Slums of Beverly Hills	Eliot Arenson	
1998	Lulu on the Bridge	Man with Gun	
1998	Brown's Requiem	Walter	
1999	Roberta	Jonathan Fishman	
1999	Coming Soon	Sid	
1999	Love Bites	Barrett	Short film
1999	Detroit Rock City	Beefy Jerk #1	
2000	Steal This Movie!	Jerry Rubin	
2000	Broke Even	Dot	
2000	Chain of Fools	Paulie	
2001	Scotland, PA	Anthony 'Banko' Banconi	
2003	See Jane Run	Frank	
2003	Chelsea Walls	Crutches	
2003	American Saint	Miles Hottonian	
2003	When Zachary Beaver Came to Town	Paulie	Credited as Kevin Fitzgerald Corrigan
2004	Wake Up, Ron Burgundy: The Lost Movie	Paul Hauser	Direct-to-video
2005	Lonesome Jim	Tim	
2005	Sexual Life	Phil	
2005	Break a Leg	J.D.	
2005	The Honeymooners	Larry the Bus Driver	Credited as Kevin Fitzgerald Corrigan
2006	Out There	Derrick	
2006	The Dog Problem	Benny	
2006	The Last Winter	Motor	Nominated—Gotham Independent Film Award for Best Ensemble Cast
2006	The Departed	Cousin Sean	
2006	Delirious	Ricco	
2006	Feel	Tony	
2007	On the Road with Judas	JJ Lask	
2007	Goodbye Baby	Randy	
2007	Superbad	Mark	
2007	American Gangster	Campizi	
2008	Definitely, Maybe	Simon	
2008	RSO [Registered Sex Offender]	Grabok	
2008	The Toe Tactic	Hector Freegood	
2008	Pineapple Express	Budlofsky	
2008	Nick and Norah's Infinite Playlist	Man at Port Authority	
2009	Hit and Run	Timothy Emser	Direct-to-video
2009	Big Fan	Sal	
2009	2B	Clayton Konroy	
2009	The Mother of Invention	Anton Pupkin	
2009	Harmony and Me	Carlos	
2009	Don't Look Up	Davis	
2009	Today's Special	Stanton	
2010	The New Tenants	Zelko	Short film
2010	Please Give	Don	
2010	Circus Maximus	Peter	
2010	Unstoppable	Inspector Scott Werner	
2010	The Next Three Days	Alex	
2011	Some Guy Who Kills People	Ken Boyd	
2011	Moves: The Rise and Rise of the New Pornographers	Dan Bejar	
2011	The Chaperone	Phillip Larue	
2011	Brutal	The Head	
2012	The Dictator	Slade	
2012	Seven Psychopaths	Dennis	
2013	Life of Crime	Ray	
2014	Winter's Tale	Romeo Tan	
2014	Wild Canaries	Anthony	
2015	Cymbeline	The Hangman	
2015	Results	Danny	Nominated—Independent Spirit Award for Best Supporting Male; Nominated—Gotham Independent Film Award for Best Actor
2015	Knight of Cups	Gus	
2015	Meadowland	Joe	
2015	The Missing Girl	Curly	
2016	Ordinary World	Pete	
2017	Take the 10	Danny	
2017	Infinity Baby	Larry	
2019	Cliffs of Freedom	Stavros Valvianos	
2019	Phoenix, Oregon	Al	
2020	Lost Girls	Joe Scalise	
2020	The King of Staten Island	Joe	
2020	Teenage Badass	Jordan	
2022	Meet Cute	Phil the Bartender	
2022	American Murderer	David Brown Sr.	
2026	The Projectionist	Donald	
TBA	Leave Not One Alive		Post-production
TBA	Bang Bang	John Eton	Festival releases 2024

=== Television ===
Year	Title	Role	Notes
1989	ABC Afterschool Special	Erik	"Taking a Stand" (Season 17: Episode 4)
1989	CBS Schoolbreak Special	Gary	"Flour Babies" (Season 7: Episode 2)
1989–1990	Superboy	Ranger / Security Guard	"With This Ring, I Thee Kill" (Season 2: Episode 1) "Superboy... Lost" (Season 3: Episode 11)
1990	Rising Son	Danny	Television film
1991	Dead and Alive: The Race for Gus Farace	Jimmy Stella Tella	Television film
1996–1997	Pearl	Franklin 'Frankie' Spivak	22 episodes
1997	Subway Stories: Tales from the Underground	Writer	Television film Segment: "The Red Shoes"
1998	Homicide: Life on the Street	Carl Curtis	"Fallen Heroes: Part 1" (Season 6: Episode 22)
2000	Freaks and Geeks	Toby	"Carded and Discarded" (Season 1: Episode 7)
2001–2005	Grounded for Life	Edwin "Eddie" Finnerty	91 episodes Credited as Kevin Fitzgerald Corrigan (76 episodes)
2003	Hack	Brad Pierson	"A Dangerous Game" (Season 1: Episode 12)
2003	Sick in the Head		Television film
2007	The Black Donnellys	Whitey	6 episodes
2009	Medium	David Brewer	"A Person of Interest" (Season 5: Episode 3)
2009	Law & Order	Ronny Aldridge	"Bailout" (Season 19: Episode 15)
2009	Damages	Finn Garrity	4 episodes
2009	Californication	Mike 'Zloz' Zlozowski	"Slow Happy Boys" (Season 3: Episode 5)
2009	Mercy	Gerard	"Pulling the Goalie" (Season 1: Episode 4) "Some of Us Have Been to the Desert" (Season 1: Episode 9)
2009–2011	Fringe	Sam Weiss	7 episodes
2010	Law & Order: Special Victims Unit	Flossy	"Ace" (Season 11: Episode 22)
2010–2014	Community	Professor Sean Garrity	"Conspiracy Theories and Interior Design" (Season 2: Episode 9) "Competitive Wine Tasting" (Season 2: Episode 20) "Introduction to Teaching" (Season 5: Episode 2)
2011	CSI: Miami	Patrick Clarkson	"About Face" (Season 9: Episode 18)
2012	Made in Jersey	Curran Papke	Episode: "Ancient History"
2012–2013	The Mentalist	Agent Bob Kirkland	7 episodes
2012–2013	The Mob Doctor	Titus Amato	4 episodes
2013	Men at Work	Darryl	Episode: "Weekend at PJ's"
2013	Necessary Roughness	William Glass	Episode: "Good Will Haunting"
2015	Public Morals	Smitty	6 episodes
2016	Portlandia	Kevin	Episode: "First Feminist City"
2016–2017	Dice	Milkshake	13 episodes
2016–2017	The Get Down	Jackie Moreno	11 episodes
2017	Blue Bloods	Jimmy Pearson	Episode: "Lost Souls"
2018	Deception	Master Thief / Prison Inmate	Episode: "Escapology"
2019	Ray Donovan	Declan Sullivan	5 episodes
2019- 2021	Godfather of Harlem	Vinero	
2022	Law & Order: Organized Crime	Vincent Bishop	3 episodes
2025	The Hunting Party	Dr. Ezekiel Malak	"Ezekiel Malak" (Season 1: Episode 2) "Xander Wax" (Season 2: Episode 13)
2025	Deli Boys	Chickie Lozano	
2025	Poker Face	Tommy Sullivan	"Last Looks" (Season 2: Episode 2)
2026	Reacher	Detective Shaun Docherty	8 Episodes (Season 4)

=== Music videos ===
- Featured in video for "Get Me" by Dinosaur Jr., from the album Where You Been, 1993
- Played band member Dan Bejar in video for "Moves" by The New Pornographers, from the album Together, 2010
- Played the Dad in video for "Safe Word" by the band Choke Chains, fronted by his long time friend and prolific Detroit musician, Thomas Jackson Potter, 2016
- Played a Parking Enforcement Officer in video for "Loading Zones" by the musician Kurt Vile, 2018
