= David Fuhrer =

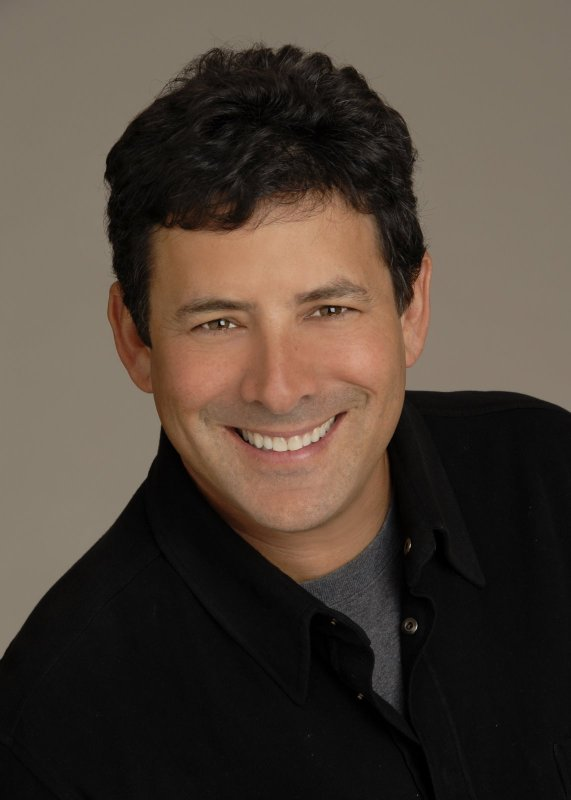
Image of David Fuhrer

David Fuhrer is an American inventor, entrepreneur, and entertainment executive. He has licensed over 300 toys, games, and household products, including items such as the Nerf Vortex Football, Aqua Doodle, and Twisty Petz. Fuhrer holds the Guinness World Record for the fastest backwards talker and currently serves as the President of the Laugh Factory, a prominent comedy club chain in North America.

== Early life and education ==
Fuhrer was raised in Westchester County, New York. He attended Boston University, where he earned a degree in Broadcasting and Film. He currently resides in Los Angeles, California.

== Career ==
=== Toy and game invention ===
Fuhrer began his career in the toy industry in the early 1980s. Over the years, he has licensed more than 300 products, generating retail sales exceeding $1 billion.

In 2009, Brandweek magazine described Fuhrer as "one of the more successful rainmakers in the toy industry" in reference to his licensing of the Guitar Hero Air Guitar Rocker.

=== Awards and recognition ===
In 2018, Fuhrer, along with collaborators Richard Kimbrough and DiscoNifty, received the Toy and Game Innovation Award (TAGIE) for "Toy Innovator of the Year" for their work on Twisty Petz by Spin Master.

=== Entertainment ventures ===
Fuhrer is the president of Laugh Factory, a comedy club chain with multiple locations in North America. Under his leadership, the brand has expanded into television and feature film production.

== Film production ==
In 2025, Fuhrer served as executive producer of Toad, the inaugural feature film under the Laugh Factory Presents banner. Directed by Adam Rifkin, Toad is a psychedelic stoner comedy that follows two slackers transporting a box of hallucinogenic toads from Los Angeles to Las Vegas. The film stars Craig Robinson, Tiffany Haddish, Katt Williams, James Franco, James Paxton, and Oliver Wyman. Fuhrer, along with Laugh Factory Head of Entertainment John Weiser and founder Jamie Masada, led the production. The film was produced by Brad Wyman, Michael P.J. Gerstein, and Mike Kolko and is set for release in spring 2026.

== Personal life ==
=== Backwards speaking ===
Fuhrer can speak backwards fluently. In 1989, he set the Guinness World Record by reciting Queen's album A Night at the Opera in reverse in 10 minutes and 19 seconds.

He has demonstrated this skill on The Tonight Show, Late Night with David Letterman, and The Ellen DeGeneres Show.

=== Publications ===
Fuhrer co-authored the book Backwords – The Secret Language of Talking Backwards and More Incredible Games, Stunts and Mind-Bending Word Fun! with Marvin Silbermintz (ISBN 978-0978817879). He also created a board game of the same name.

=== Major film appearances by David Fuhrer ===
In 1989, Fuhrer co-starred in the comedy/horror film Monster High, Playing the character Mel Anoma.
