= Rhythm Thief =

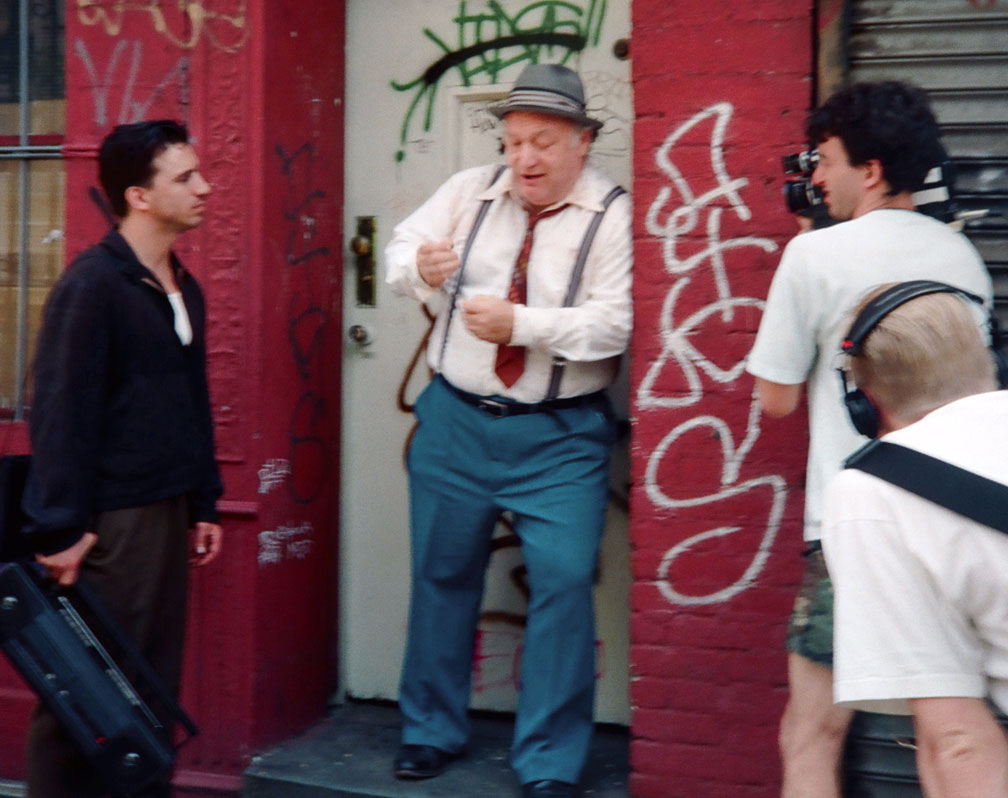
- Filming Rhythm Thief on Ridge Street on the Lower East Side.
- Directed by: Matthew Harrison
- Written by: Christopher Grimm; Matthew Harrison
- Produced by: Jonathan Starch
- Starring: Jason Andrews; Kevin Corrigan; Eddie Daniels; Kimberly Flynn
- Cinematography: Howard Krupa
- Edited by: Matthew Harrison
- Music by: John Horn; Kevin Okerlund; Daniel Brenner; Hugh O’Donovan
- Distributed by: Strand Releasing; Film Four
- Release date: September 9, 1994 (TIFF)
- Running time: 88 minutes
- Country: United States
- Language: English

Rhythm Thief is a 1994 independent drama film directed by Matthew Harrison. The standard 16mm black-and-white feature was made for US$11,000 and was awarded a Special Jury Recognition for Directing at the Sundance Film Festival. It was given a limited theatrical release in the US and Europe on November 15, 1995. In 2008, Rhythm Thief was released on DVD by Kino Lorber.

== Plot ==
Simon is a downwardly mobile urban white male who hustles a living selling audio cassette bootleg music on the streets of New York City's Lower East Side. Simon lives in a tenement walk-up where everyone calls him 'Whitey'. Cyd, who has a real job, visits Simon for sex on weekday mornings; while Simon's bootleg-wannabe sidekick Fuller has innocent romantic fantasies about Cyd.

Cynthia Sley of all-girl militant punk band 1-900 BOXX has learned Simon is selling her music and pays a violent visit with her thugs. They beat up Simon and smash his gear. Further complicating Simon's life, Marty, a girl from his past, shows up with her suitcase to announce that Simon's mother has died.

Simon borrows money from his middle-aged mentor, Mr. Bunch, so he can record a 1-900 BOXX gig. The band comes after Simon, beats Fuller, and hounds Simon out of the city with Marty in tow. Simon and Marty hightail it to Queens on the subway, ending in Far Rockaway where Marty confesses her love to Simon and they spend a romantic night under the boardwalk at 105th Street.

But there is no escape for Simon; he is drawn inexorably back to the neighborhood for a final electrifying reckoning with fate.

== Cast ==
- Jason Andrews as Simon
- Eddie Daniels as Marty
- Kevin Corrigan as Fuller
- Kimberly Flynn as Cyd
- Sean Hagerty as Shayme
- Mark Alfred as Mr. Bunch
- Christopher Cooke as Jules
- Bob McGrath as Rat-Boy
- Alan Davidson as Otis
- Paul Rodriguez as Eladio

== Production ==
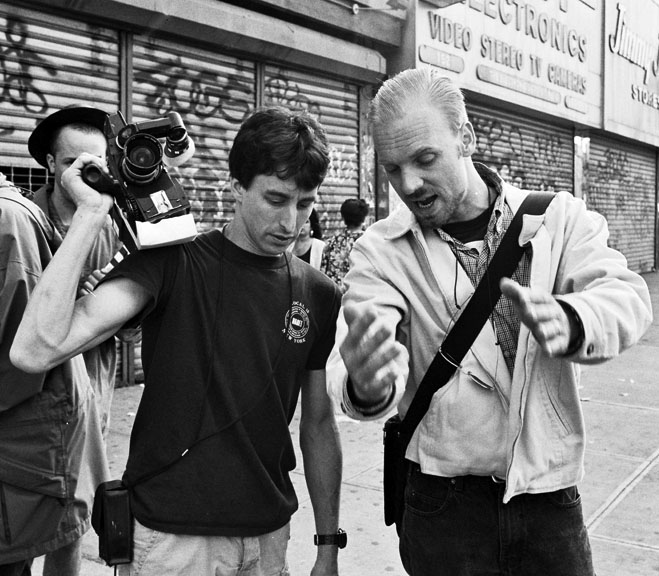
Harrison with cinematographer Howard Krupa on Delancey Street during photography of Rhythm Thief, June 1993.

=== Development and writing ===
Of the genesis for Rhythm Thief, Matthew Harrison said he "had a two page idea that I wrote quickly. I didn't want to get caught up in the development process. I had the actor I wanted—Jason Andrews—and a building to shoot in." Based on his idea, Harrison and Christopher Grimm collaborated on a screenplay. When Harrison's first feature film Spare Me won the Kodak Prix Tournage at the Avignon Film Festival, he used the prize money to complete Rhythm Thief.

=== Filming ===
In June 1993 Harrison and producer Jonathan Starch raised $11,000 to film on an 11-day schedule. Shooting commenced on June 7, 1993, based out of 124 Ridge Street Gallery on Manhattan's Lower East Side. Said Harrison, "I just wanted the DP, his assistant, the sound recordist, and the boom person. Starch, the producer, was also the script supervisor, the production manager, and the assistant director, all in one. He had the script and a walkie-talkie. We really did the script supervising in our heads."

Most of the film was filmed downtown near Delancey Street in a neighborhood Harrison described as "more of a nightmare than the film shows". The filming activity raised the attentions of local police, but Harrison said the police ignored the necessary permits when they found out the crew was only shooting a movie.

== Release ==
Writing of the film's screening at the 1994 Montreal World Film Festival, Ken Eisner of Variety said the film "gets stronger as it moves confidently forward, weaving together the lives of some very desperate Lower East Siders before reaching a quietly devastating close." At the Boston Film Festival, Jay Carr of The Boston Globe commented, "Andrews' face projects the perfect mix of sensitivity and self-absorption to power the post-punk romanticism. Harrison's camerawork thrusts us into his film and into his romantic embrace of Simon's crumbling world with alluring desperation. There's another burst of lovely bleakness when Simon flees with his old flame on the subway to Far Rockaway for a brief respite. The shot of them kissing between the cars of the subway hurtling across the bridge to Brooklyn alone makes the film worth seeing." At the New Orleans Film Festival, David Baron of The Times Picayune wrote, "Evocatively written, terrifically acted and grittily shot, it feels more like life than art."

In addition, Rhythm Thief was programmed at Toronto International Film Festival, Chicago International Film Festival, Philadelphia Film Festival and screened at the Walter Reade Theater by the Film Society of Lincoln Center on November 10, 1994.

=== Sundance Film Festival ===
The film was selected to screen in the narrative competition at the 1995 Sundance Film Festival. Rhythm Thief was said to be close to winning the festival's highest award, but the judges at Sundance were reportedly split over which film should win the Grand Jury Prize, which eventually went to the film The Brothers McMullen. The film did manage to win a Jury Award for Directing, of which Dan Vebber of Film Threat wrote, was "a category more or less created because judges were deadlocked".

=== Foreign festivals ===
At the Berlin International Film Festival, Rhythm Thief was labeled "fresh, bold, mind blowing", and "New York's independent cinema at its best". UK distribution company Film Four International picked up all foreign rights at the festival and took the picture to the Cannes Film Market.

Rhythm Thief also played other overseas film festivals including São Paulo International Film Festival, Rio Cine Festival, Gijón International Film Festival, Ljubljana International Film Festival, Avignon Film Festival and Filmfest München.

=== U.S. theatrical release ===
By mid-1995, US rights to Rhythm Thief were purchased by Strand Releasing, who released Rhythm Thief on select screens in the US on November 15, 1995. Of the picture's run at New York City's Film Forum, Stephen Holden of The New York Times wrote, "[Rhythm Thief] has the edgy, loose-jointed spontaneity of a hip-hop, avant-funk Breathless". Dave Kehr of the Daily News made note of "the aggressive stylishness of Howard Krupa’s high-contrast photography" and "the adrenalin rush of director Harrison's quick, flashy editing", while John Anderson of Newsday described the film as "nasty/beautiful...a pulse of artistic anxiety, adrenaline-rushed." Godfrey Cheshire of the New York Press wrote "this Loisaida scum pond teams with life, and every scene in Rhythm Thief finds new delight in mounting the specimens".

Of the film's Los Angeles release at the Sunset Laemmle Five, Kevin Thomas of the Los Angeles Times wrote: "Matthew Harrison's Rhythm Thief is a triumph of economy in all senses that pops up to deliver a knockout punch." The Los Angeles Reader opined: "Despite its spare look and handheld camera work, Matthew Harrison's low budget feature shows a shrewd command of film-making technique. There is an edgy energy to the film."

== Awards ==
Besides the Special Jury Recognition for Directing at the 1995 Sundance Film Festival, Rhythm Thief also won the First Prize for Features at the 1995 Florida Film Festival, First Prize for Features at the 1994 New Orleans Film Festival, Best Dramatic Feature at the 1995 SXSW Film Festival, and the Kodak Award at the 1995 Sinking Creek Film Festival.

== Home media ==
In December of 2024, Kino Lorber released a high-definition Blu-ray edition of Rhythm Thief scanned, under the supervision of Harrison, at 4K from the original 16mm camera negative. The disc includes two previously deleted scenes, a S8mm trailer made for the film, a new director's commentary by Harrison, and a one hour and nineteen minute documentary about the making of the film.

Martin Scorsese, an early supporter of the film, supplied a quote for the DVD release, calling the film "Inventive, exciting, original".
