= Amy Davidson =

American actress (born 1979)

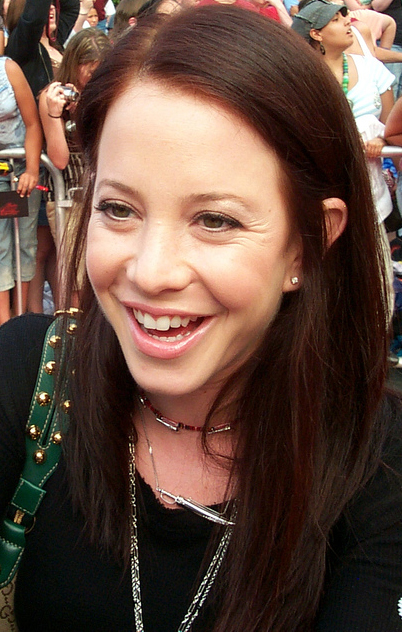
- Davidson in June 2006
- Born: September 15, 1979 (age 46); Phoenix, Arizona, U.S.
- Occupation: Actress
- Years active: 1995–present
- Spouse: Kacy Lockwood (m. 2010)
- Children: 1
- Website: amydavidson.com

Amy Davidson (born September 15, 1979) is an American actress. She played Kerry Hennessy in the ABC sitcom 8 Simple Rules.

== Early life and education ==
Born in Phoenix, Arizona, Davidson was raised by educators. Her father was a principal at El Mirage Elementary School, and her mother was an English teacher at Desert Foothills Junior High School. Her parents enrolled her in dance classes as a young child. While attending Shadow Mountain High School, she began appearing in advertisements. Her acting coach encouraged her to move to Hollywood.

== Career ==
After appearing in the TV movie The Truth About Jane and an episode of the drama series Judging Amy, she was cast in the Mary-Kate and Ashley Olsen series So Little Time. Beginning in 2002, she then portrayed Kerry Hennessy in all 76 episodes of 8 Simple Rules. She guest-starred on the sitcom Malcolm in the Middle and in the Hallmark Channel film Annie's Point opposite Betty White and Richard Thomas. Other roles include the film Goyband, in which she stars as a young Orthodox Jewish girl who falls for an ex-boyband pop star (Adam Pascal) who performs at her family's hotel in the Catskill Mountains.

Davidson also runs a fashion and lifestyle blog.

== Personal life ==
Davidson married Kacy Lockwood on May 1, 2010. On November 2, 2015, Davidson announced on Instagram that they were expecting their first child. She gave birth to their son on March 1, 2016.

== Filmography ==
=== Film ===
Year	Title	Role	Notes
1995	Teenage Tupelo	Ticket Girl	Uncredited
2007	Netherbeast Incorporated	Pearl Stricklett	
2008	Goyband	Rebekka	
2008	The Capture of the Green River Killer	Helen (Hel)	
2015	Battle Scars	Jules Stephens	
2015	Tales from the Toilet	Amy	Short film
2019	Ernesto's Manifesto	Cassie	
2020	Kinetic	Aunt Drea	Short film
2022	Gatlopp	Briana	

=== Television ===
2023	killing it	Brock's wife	Notes
2000	The Truth About Jane	Elizabeth	TV movie
2001	Judging Amy	Lindsey Sandowski	Episode: "Look Closer"
2001–2002	So Little Time	Cammie Morton	Recurring role; 8 episodes
2002–2005	8 Simple Rules	Kerry Hennessy	Main role (76 episodes)
2004	Family Face-Off: Hollywood	Herself, co-host	Main role (5 episodes)
2004	Punk'd	Herself, prank victim	Episode: "Kaley Cuoco/The Rock/Julia Stiles"
2004–2005	Pet Star	Herself, judge	2 episodes
2005	Annie's Point	Ella Eason	Movie
2005	Brandy & Mr. Whiskers	Tiffany Turlington	Episode: "One of a Kind"
2006	Strong Medicine	Jamie	Episode: "Baby Boom!"
2006	Malcolm in the Middle	Paula	Episode: "Lois Strikes Back"
2006	Little Talent Show	Herself, judge	3 episodes
2007	CSI: NY	Carolyn	Episode: "Past Imperfect"
2008	The Capture of the Green River Killer	Helen Ramus	Mini-series; main role
2009	Criminal Minds	Zoe Hawkes	Episode: "Zoe's Reprise"
2009	Ghost Whisperer	Dana Mayhew	Episode: "Head Over Heels"
2010	Firebreather	Jenna Shwartzendruber	TV movie
2011	CSI: Crime Scene Investigation	Leslie Gitig	Episode: "Tell-Tale Hearts"
2012	House	Molly	Episode: "We Need the Eggs"
2012	Major Crimes (TV series)	Allison Fisher	Episode: "Before and After"
2013	Tia & Tamera	Herself	4 episodes
2014	The Brittany Murphy Story	Jackie	Movie
2014	Bones	Dr. Leona Saunders	Episode: "The Corpse at the Convention"
2015	Better Call Saul	Sabrina	Episode: "Marco"
2015	Hell's Kitchen	Herself	Episode: "8 Chefs Compete Again"
2017	Marlon	Susan Smith	Episode: "Appropriate Marlon"
2019	The Rookie	Susanna Brown	Episode: "Impact"
2021	All Rise	Kelsey Strong	Episode: "Bette Davis Eyes"
2023	The Lincoln Lawyer	Karen Foster	Episode: "Discovery"
2024	High Potential	Sarah Keller	Episode: "Survival Mode"
