= List of characters in the Shrek franchise =

This is a list of characters that appear in the Shrek franchise.

== Main characters ==
- Shrek (voiced by Mike Myers in the films and Michael Gough in the video games, spin-offs, commercials and other media) is the titular character: a large, grumpy green ogre and the lead character in all of the Shrek films. Chris Farley was originally cast to be the voice of Shrek, but he died before he could complete his voice work. He had finished 85–95% of his lines.
- Donkey (voiced by Eddie Murphy in the films, Mark Moseley in the video games, and Dean Edwards in Scared Shrekless and Thriller Night) is a happy-go-lucky talking donkey, and Shrek's best friend who has a deep obsession with singing and waffles.
- Princess Fiona (speaking voice by Cameron Diaz, singing voice provided by Sally Dworsky in the first film, Renee Sands on all other occasions, and Holly Fields in the video games) is the princess of the kingdom of Far Far Away and Shrek's wife from the end of the first film on.
- Puss in Boots (voiced by Antonio Banderas in the English, Spanish and Italian versions of the films, Eric Bauza in The Adventures of Puss in Boots and The Trident, vocal sounds and purrs provided by Frank Welker, and voiced by André Sogliuzzo in the video games, commercials and other media) is Shrek's best friend along with Donkey. He is also the lead character of the Puss in Boots films and the TV series based on it. He is inspired by the fairy tale "Puss in Boots" and the character of Zorro.
- Kitty Softpaws (voiced by Salma Hayek Pinault in the films and Margo Rey in The Trident) is a declawed, thieving bicolor cat introduced as Puss' love interest in the prequel spin-off Puss in Boots and later reunited with him and rekindling said relationship after Santa Coloma in Puss in Boots: The Last Wish.

== Introduced in Shrek ==
- Dragon is depicted as a ruby-colored dragon, initially known as the guard of the tower in which Princess Fiona awaits her rescuer in the first film, later becoming Donkey's mate.
- Gingerbread Man (voiced by Conrad Vernon), nicknamed "Gingy", is from the fairy tale of the runaway cookie. In the first film, Shrek, Lord Farquaad kidnaps him and tortures him for information, but Gingy refuses to reveal Shrek's location. After being freed following the death of Farquaad, he joined Shrek and the others, and in Shrek 2 he becomes one of their best friends. There is an echo in the second film, where a gigantic gingerbread man baked by The Muffin Man helps storm the castle.
- Pinocchio (voiced by Cody Cameron) is drawn ultimately from the Italian novel The Adventures of Pinocchio by Carlo Collodi, with animation reminiscent of the 1940 Disney version. Starting from Shrek 2, he becomes one of Shrek's best friends and he fulfils his dream of being turned into a real boy, but in a few moments he is made of wood again.
- Three Little Pigs (voiced by Cody Cameron) are the pigs from the classic fairytale. They are distinguished by their hats and are some of Shrek's best friends. They speak with a German accent.
- The Big Bad Wolf (voiced by Aron Warner) is the wolf from the story of Little Red Riding Hood, dressed as a grandmother. Starting with Shrek 2, he becomes one of Shrek's best friends, helping him along with his other companions, and he sent the Fairy Godmother flying. He is usually quiet, with a dry and monotonous voice.
- The Three Blind Mice are based on the English nursery rhyme of the same name. They are three albino mice with sunglasses and wooden canes and with a British accent.
- Lord Farquaad (voiced by John Lithgow in the films, Andre Sogliuzzo in Shrek Smash n' Crash Racing, Piotr Michael in DreamWorks All-Star Kart Racing) is the narcissistic, ruthless and short ruler of the huge castle of Duloc. He is based on Richard III of England as depicted in Richard III (1955 film), and is an enemy of Shrek.
- The Magic Mirror (voiced by Chris Miller) is primarily used to provide information on various individuals, and can be used like a television. When Farquaad died, he was freed and joined Shrek and his friends.
- Thelonius (voiced by Christopher Knights) is Lord Farquaad's executioner and torturer of Duloc.
- Monsieur Hood (voiced by Vincent Cassel) is a famous hero with a French accent, who tries to rescue Fiona, thinking she is Shrek's prey.
- Snow White (voiced by Amy Poehler (speaking voice) and Megan Hilty (singing voice) in Shrek the Third) is proposed as one of the candidates to marry Farquaad, also appearing asleep in an urn that the seven dwarfs leave on Shrek's table, and later being present at Shrek and Fiona's wedding. In Shrek the Third she is one of Fiona and the others' princess friends.
- Cinderella (voiced by Amy Sedaris in Shrek the Third) is proposed as one of the candidates to marry Farquaad, and later she is present at Shrek and Fiona's wedding. In Shrek the Third she is one of Fiona and the others' princess friends.

== Introduced in Shrek 2 ==
- King Harold (voiced by John Cleese) is Fiona's father. He made a pact with the Fairy Godmother involving blackmail against him to get Fiona to marry Charming and he is actually the Frog Prince.
- Queen Lillian (voiced by Julie Andrews) is Fiona's mother. Along with King Harold, and despite being more understanding than her husband, she is also initially surprised to see her daughter turned into an ogre and married to Shrek.
- Fairy Godmother (voiced by Jennifer Saunders in the films, Claudia Christian in the video games, and Pinky Turzo in Thriller Night) is a scheming, conniving opportunist, loosely based on the fairy godmother from the fairy tale "Cinderella".
- Prince Charming (voiced by Rupert Everett in the second and third films, Sean Bishop in Scared Shrekless, James Arnold Taylor in video games) is the son of the Fairy Godmother, who pretends to be Shrek in an effort to win Fiona's heart and marry her.
- Dronkeys are the six children of Donkey and Dragon, a hybrid of both dragons and donkeys. They are first introduced in a post-credits scene.
- Doris (voiced by Larry King in the US, and Jonathan Ross in the UK) is one of Cinderella's ugly stepsisters, and a great friend and confidant in Fiona's group of friends. After being encouraged by Shrek and his friends to quit her old job as a waitress at the Poison Apple bar, she joins Fiona and the other princesses in the third film, and later reunites with her sister Mabel.
- Captain Hook (voiced by Ian McShane) is a character in the story of Peter Pan. He plays the piano in the Poison Apple tavern. Although he has a brief appearance in the second film, in the third he acts as a secondary villain.
- The Headless Horseman (voiced by Conrad Vernon) appears drinking alongside King Harold in The Poison Apple, and also juggling outside the bar. He also appears in the third film as an ally of Prince Charming.
- Cyclops (voiced by Mark Valley) is a villain who acts as the bouncer of The Poison Apple. He is married and has a daughter who, like him, only has one large eye in the center of her forehead.
- Evil trees are talking trees that they frequent as the most loyal customers of The Poison Apple. In the third film they join the side of Prince Charming's villains, and it is seen that they are from the Wizard of Oz universe.
- Mongo (voiced by Conrad Vernon), he is a giant gingerbread man and Gingy's brother; he appears in Shrek 2 to storm the castle alongside Shrek and his friends, and he dies losing his arms and drowning in the moat.
- Sleeping Beauty (voiced by Cheri Oteri in Shrek the Third) is one of the guests at the castle party, but falls asleep upon arrival. In Shrek the Third she is one of Fiona and the others' princess friends.
- The Muffin Man (voiced by Conrad Vernon) is the creator and "father" of Gingy and Mongo, he is the one who baked Gingy. In Shrek 2, he is responsible for baking Mongo. In Shrek Forever After, he works at Shrek's party.

== Introduced in Shrek the Third ==
- Fergus, Farkle and Felicia (voiced by Miles Christopher Bakshi, Nina Zoe Bakshi, and Dante James Hauser) are the triplet children of Shrek and Fiona, two boys and a girl. They appear together in Shrek the Third, Shrek the Halls, Shrek Forever After, and Scared Shrekless as babies. They appear as teenagers in Shrek 5. Zendaya will provide voice for Felicia.
- Arthur Pendragon (voiced by Justin Timberlake) is a cousin of Fiona, based on the legendary figure King Arthur.
- Merlin (voiced by Eric Idle) is a powerful wizard who controls all kinds of magic and spells. Artie comes to him for his aid when he knows he is going to be king. He was a teacher in the magic class at Artie's school, although his spells don't always turn out as he expects, as he switched Puss and Donkey's bodies.
- Rapunzel (voiced by Maya Rudolph) is one of Fiona and the others' princess friends who betrays Fiona to join Charming and his allies.
- Mabel (voiced by Regis Philbin) is Cinderella's other ugly stepsister. She used to be the head manager of The Poison Apple and the boss of everything around her.
- Evil Queen (voiced by Susanne Blakeslee) is Snow White's stepmother who is jealous of her and in the end she admits that she has always wanted to open a spa in France.
- The Puppet Master (voiced by Chris Miller) is a wood carver who was a regular at the Poison Apple. He was also Pinocchio's former nemesis. Although his name is not mentioned in the film, in the video game he is called Stromboli.
- Lancelot (voiced by John Krasinski) is the captain of the Worcestershire Academy's jousting team. Initially mistaken by Shrek for Arthur, he is actually one of the students who bully him. In the film's DVD bonus features, his full name is mentioned as Lancelot du Lac.

== Introduced in Shrek Forever After ==
- Rumpelstiltskin (voiced by Walt Dohrn) is an evil short con artist who makes magical deals solidified with contracts, based on the fairy tale character of the same name.
- Pied Piper is a mute boy from the original story. He briefly appears in Shrek's swamp, along with the rest of the banished story characters, as a young boy who attracts a group of mice while playing his flute. In Shrek Forever After, he is represented as a mute and intelligent type of antihero, as he is presented as a kind of mercenary for hire. Depending on the way he activates his flute, some creatures or others will dance to the sound of the music, unable to control their movements. At the end of the film he is seen forcing Rumpelstiltskin to dance to his music.
- Some ogre characters include:
  - Brogan (voiced by Jon Hamm) is the leader of the army against Rumpelstiltskin.
  - Cookie (voiced by Craig Robinson) is in charge of cooking in the army against Rumpelstiltskin.
  - Gretched (voiced by Jane Lynch) is a member of the army against Rumpelstiltskin.
- Witches (voiced by Kristen Schaal, Mary Kay Place, Lake Bell, Kathy Griffin, Billie Hayes, Meredith Vieira and Mike Mitchell) work for Rumpelstiltskin. They are seemingly inspired by the Wicked Witch of the West from the 1939 film The Wizard of Oz, as they have green skin and can be killed by water.

== Introduced in Puss in Boots ==
- Humpty Dumpty (voiced by Zach Galifianakis) is the mastermind who intends to retrieve the Golden Eggs from the one-of-a-kind Goose. He is based on the character of the same name.
- Jack and Jill (voiced by Billy Bob Thornton and Amy Sedaris) are married outlaws, based on the nursery rhyme with the same name.
- The Golden Goose is a huge goose that lives in the castle at the top of the bean plant, has a baby that provides golden eggs and it is known as the Great Terror.
- Jack (voiced by Mike Mitchell) is a character from the story "Jack and the Beanstalk". He is an old man who lives in a prison where he has gone mad during his stay.
- Imelda (voiced by Constance Marie) is Puss' human adoptive mother.

== Introduced in Puss in Boots: The Last Wish ==
- Perrito (voiced by Harvey Guillen) is a friendly and naïve dog who is initially disguised as one of Mama Luna's pet cats and wants to become a therapy dog. Since the end of the film, he officially names the trio "Team Friendship". His name means little dog in Spanish.
- Death (voiced by Wagner Moura) is the personification of Death who takes on the form of a wolf. He is initially presumed to be a bounty hunter before revealing his true identity to Puss, who he wants to personally kill as punishment for carelessly wasting eight of his nine lives. He wields twin sickles that combine into a double-bladed glaive.
- Big Jack Horner (voiced by John Mulaney in Puss in Boots: The Last Wish) is an adult version of the character from the nursery rhyme "Little Jack Horner". In addition to owning a pastry business, he's also a crime lord who plans to obtain the wishing star to obtain control of all Magic.
- Goldilocks and the Three Bears (voiced by Florence Pugh with Ray Winstone, Olivia Colman and Samson Kayo) are based on the book. Goldilocks is a criminal who, as a child, was adopted by the Three Bears, who acted as her cronies as she grew older. She looks for the wishing star to have a real family, but does not accept and becomes part of the bear family. The characters have no relation to those who appear in the Shrek films.
- Ethical Bug (voiced by Kevin McCann) is the cricket from The Adventures of Pinocchio. He appears in the possession of Jack Horner as his advisor, or rather a witness to his atrocities. He tries to get Jack to make good decisions, although without any success.
