= Scared Shrekless =

2010 film directed by Gary Trousdale

- DVD cover
- Genre: Fantasy comedy Halloween
- Based on: Shrek! by William Steig
- Screenplay by: Gary Trousdale; Sean Bishop
- Story by: Clairee Morrissey ("Bride of Gingy"); Robert Porter ("Boots Motel"); Sean Bishop ("Shreksorcist")
- Directed by: Gary Trousdale; Raman Hui
- Starring: Mike Myers; Cameron Diaz; Antonio Banderas; Kristen Schaal; Dean Edwards; Cody Cameron; Christopher Knights; Conrad Vernon; Aron Warner
- Theme music composer: Halli Cauthery
- Country of origin: United States
- Original language: English

Production
- Executive producer: Gary Trousdale
- Producers: Karen Foster; Chad Hammes
- Running time: 26 minutes
- Production companies: DreamWorks Animation; Pacific Data Images (uncredited)

Original release
- Network: NBC
- Release: October 28, 2010

Scared Shrekless is a 2010 American animated Halloween fantasy comedy television special based on the Shrek franchise. The special premiered on the American television network NBC on October 28, 2010.

The special marks the first time outside of the video games that Donkey is now voiced by Dean Edwards since Eddie Murphy wasn't available to return. Rupert Everett and Chris Miller were both replaced by Sean Bishop as Prince Charming and Mister Geppetto, respectively, while Miles Christopher Bakshi and Nina Zoe Bakshi reprise their roles as Fergus, Farkle, and Felicia. It was produced with the working title of Shrek or Treat.

== Plot ==
After Fiona and their three children scare away some teenage trick or treaters, Shrek, Donkey, Puss, the Three Little Pigs, the Big Bad Wolf, Gingy, and Pinocchio, after unsuccessfully trying to scare Shrek and his family, decide to make a bet to see who can tell scary stories. Shrek claims that whoever can tell the scariest story without getting eliminated will be crowned King of Halloween. They go to the rundown kingdom of Duloc where Lord Farquaad once reigned and get settled inside his abandoned castle. Each takes turns telling their story:

First, Gingy tells a story called "The Bride of Gingy", which he goes to see the Muffin Man and tells him that his girlfriend dumped him because he only thought of himself. So, he and the Muffin Man make a new girlfriend named Sugar. When they make her, Gingy decides to use a lot of sugar, thinking that she will love him forever, despite the Muffin Man's warnings against doing so. When she is baked, Gingy is initially happy with her, but ends up disturbed by her obsession with him. After running away and pushing her in a big container of batter, he finally becomes free of her, unaware that the batter Sugar was dropped in ended up creating thousands of zombie clones of herself, surrounding Gingy and eating him. This story causes the elimination of the Three Little Pigs, who get scared and run away and Big Bad Wolf heads after them on the grounds that they're his ride home. Shrek comments on the falsehood of Gingy's story, saying that he cannot be there if he was eaten, and Gingy runs off as well to hide his embarrassment, resulting in his elimination as well.

Next, Donkey and Puss tell a story called "Boots Motel", which they take shelter from a thunderstorm at the Boots Motel. Their story starts off well, but when Donkey tells it, it always ends up with Puss getting killed, which irritates Puss to no end, so Puss decides to change it: Donkey and Puss go to the motel, but Donkey then calls Puss his sidekick. When Puss tries to deny it, Donkey says he took a tongue bath, and gets killed by the innkeeper, but Puss retells it, saying he would fight the innkeeper but the keeper gets knocked over by Donkey, who rescues Puss. It turns out that the keeper was Prince Charming and he zaps Puss with his wand to dust, but Puss says he used his sword and leaped to safety, but Donkey says he was standing on an 'X' spot, which Charming pulls a lever to drop Puss to oblivion, but Puss says he would never let that happen to him, so he says that he woke up, revealing to be all a dream. Donkey comes in and tells Puss that he is actually on the ceiling. The lights go out and when they come back on, Donkey is in the shower and about to be eaten by a giant waffle. Donkey tries to run, but gets on the plate covered in butter, wears a pink tutu, a sombrero, and a coconut bra. Finally, Donkey bribes Pinocchio to eliminate Puss by spraying him with water in exchange for a dollar bill. Shrek suspects that this was cheating, but declares he, Donkey, and Pinocchio made it to the final three.

Finally, Shrek tells a story called "The Shreksorcist", which he experience babysitting a crazed and possessed Pinocchio. After repeatedly beating up Shrek, Pinocchio leaps from the window, despite Shrek's attempts to catch him. When Pinocchio lands on the streets, a talking cricket pops out of Pinocchio's head, claiming to be his conscience and the voice in his head that made him go crazy, in which Pinocchio squashes him with his foot in retaliation. Pinocchio denies that the story is true, but when Shrek shows him a normal cricket, he screams and flees in terror, being eliminated.

Being declared the final two in the story-telling contest, Shrek and Donkey go through a non-story elimination round by once again discussing the rumors about Farquaad's ghost, with Shrek recalling that Donkey was involved in Farquaad's demise. Suddenly, they hear the wind moving about, and a walking suit of armor calling Donkey's name. It appears to be Farquaad's ghost, who has come to exact revenge. Scared out of his wits, Donkey runs away, resulting in him being the final one to be eliminated. Fiona reveals it was her and the babies who planned the ghost act, declaring Shrek the winner of the scary story contest and the "King of Halloween", and then they celebrate by egging the Seven Dwarfs.

== Cast ==
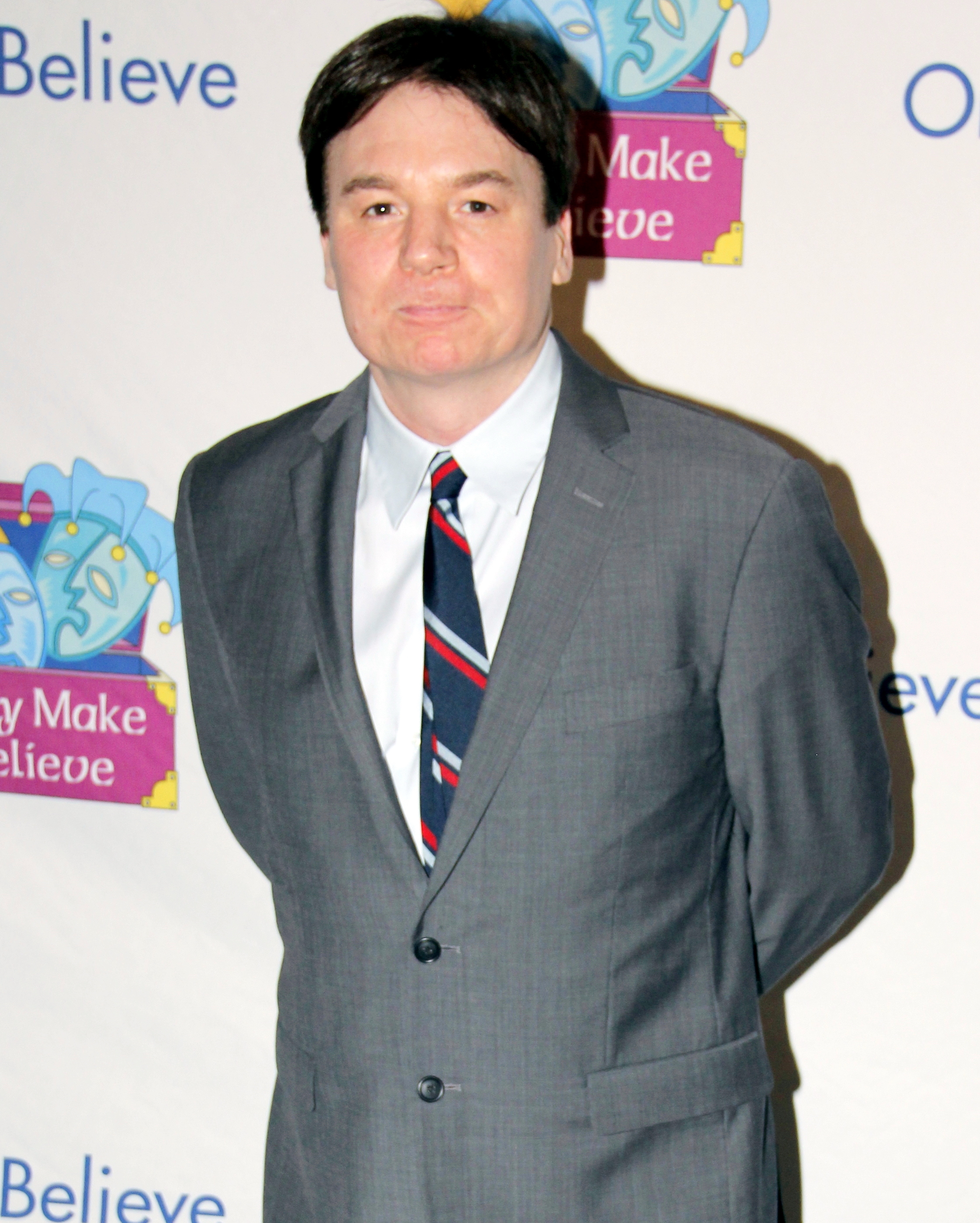
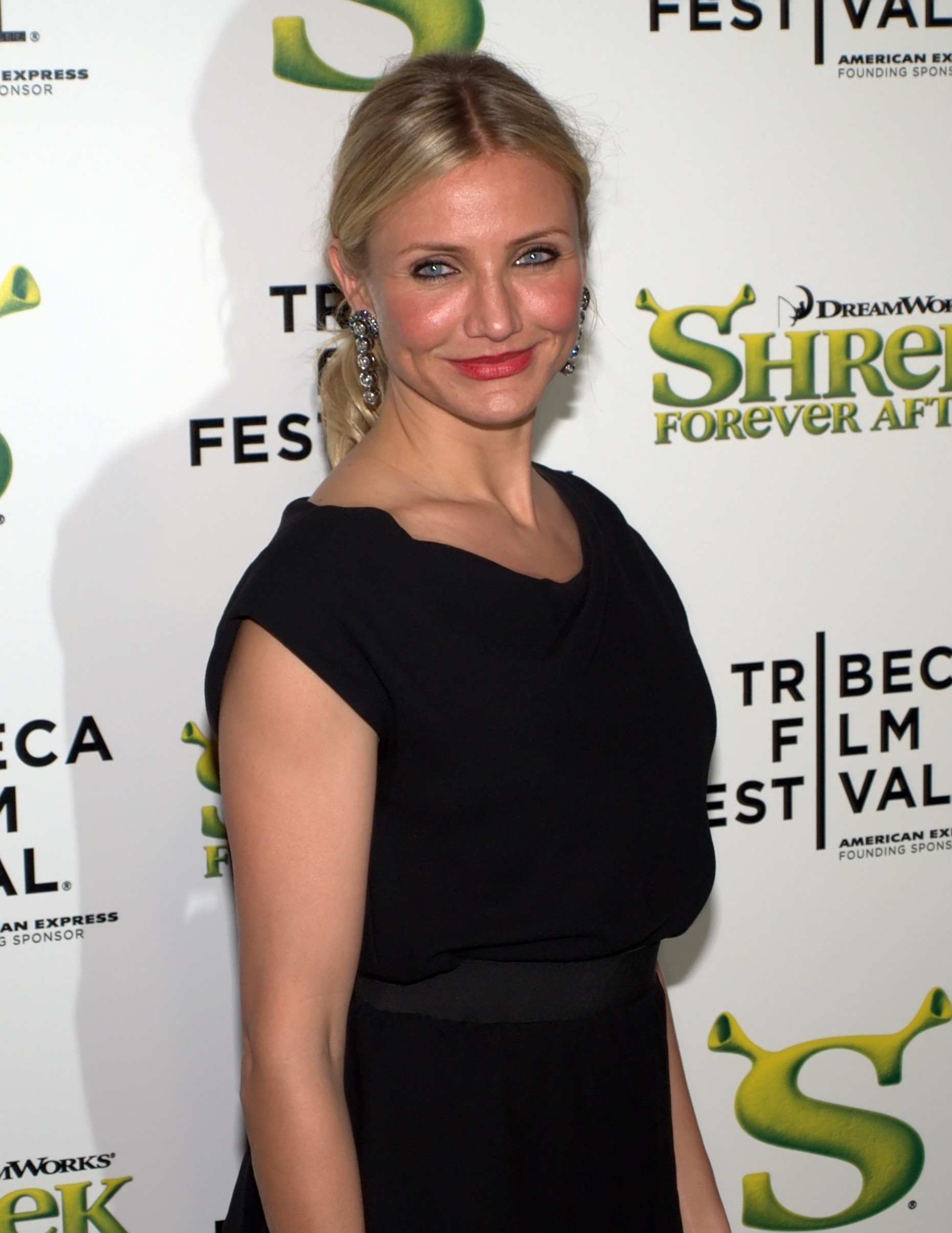
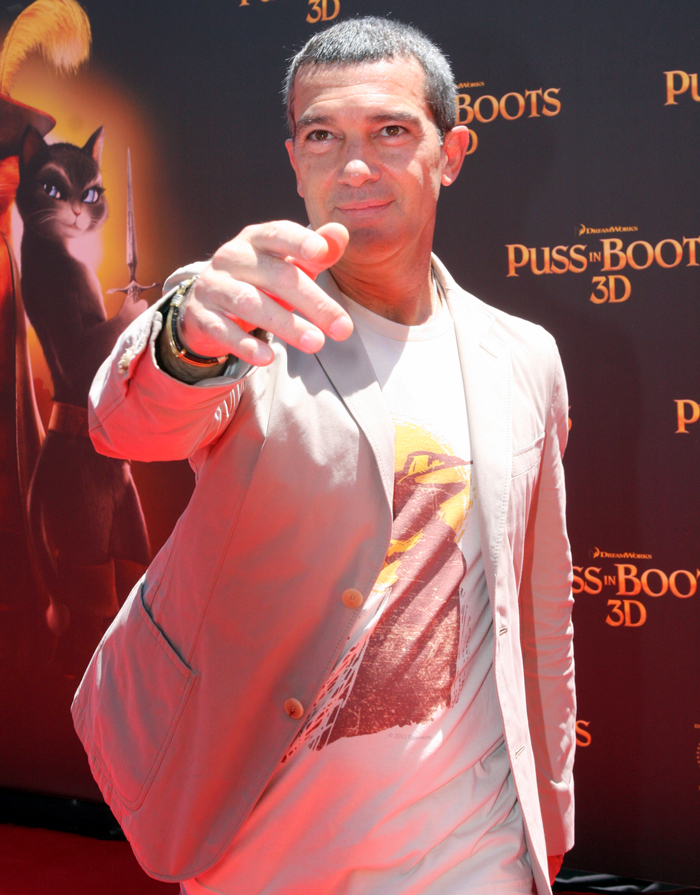
Mike Myers (in 2011), Cameron Diaz (in 2010) and Antonio Banderas (in 2011)
- Mike Myers as Shrek
- Dean Edwards as Donkey
- Cameron Diaz as Princess Fiona
- Antonio Banderas as Puss in Boots
- Cody Cameron as Pinocchio and Three Little Pigs
- Conrad Vernon as Gingy and Muffin Man
- Christopher Knights as Three Blind Mice
- Aron Warner as Big Bad Wolf
- Kristen Schaal as Sugar
- Sean Bishop as Geppetto, Prince Charming, Cricket, Dwarves, and Waffle
- Miles Christopher Bakshi and Nina Zoe Bakshi as Ogre Babies (Felicia, Farkle and Fergus)
- Louis Gabriel Basso III as Teenager #1
- Devon Werkheiser as Teenagers #2 and #3

== Home media ==
Scared Shrekless was released on DVD on September 13, 2011. The release was accompanied by a new short animated film, titled Thriller Night (a parody of the song by Michael Jackson). It was re-released on August 28, 2012, as part of the Shrek's Thrilling Tales DVD and the DreamWorks Spooky Stories Blu-ray.

== See also ==
- List of films set around Halloween
