= Donkey (Shrek) =

Fictional character in the Shrek franchise

- Shrek character
- Donkey as he appears in Shrek (2001)
- First appearance: Shrek! (1990 book); Shrek (2001 film)
- Created by: William Steig
- Adapted by: Ted Elliott; Terry Rossio; Joe Stillman; Roger S. H. Schulman
- Voiced by: Eddie Murphy (2001–present); Mark Moseley (2001–2015); Dean Edwards (2010–present)

In-universe information
- Species: Donkey; Horse (briefly)
- Gender: Male
- Family: Donkey Senior (great-grandfather); Great-Great Grampy Don-Don (great-great-uncle); Unnamed mother; Unnamed father; Unnamed grandmother
- Spouse: Dragon
- Children: Debbie; Coco; Bananas; Peanut; Parfait; Eclair

Donkey is a fictional character created by William Steig and adapted by DreamWorks Animation for the Shrek franchise. He is voiced by Eddie Murphy. Donkey is an anthropomorphic donkey and his appearance is modeled after a miniature donkey named Perry. He is depicted with grey fur, brown eyes, and a black mane. In the franchise, he is the sidekick and best friend of Shrek, husband to Dragon, and father to a litter of Dronkeys (Dragon-Donkeys). As the series' comic relief character, Donkey is well-regarded by critics for his humor, wisdom, energetic nature and Murphy's performance.

== Donkey in Shrek films ==
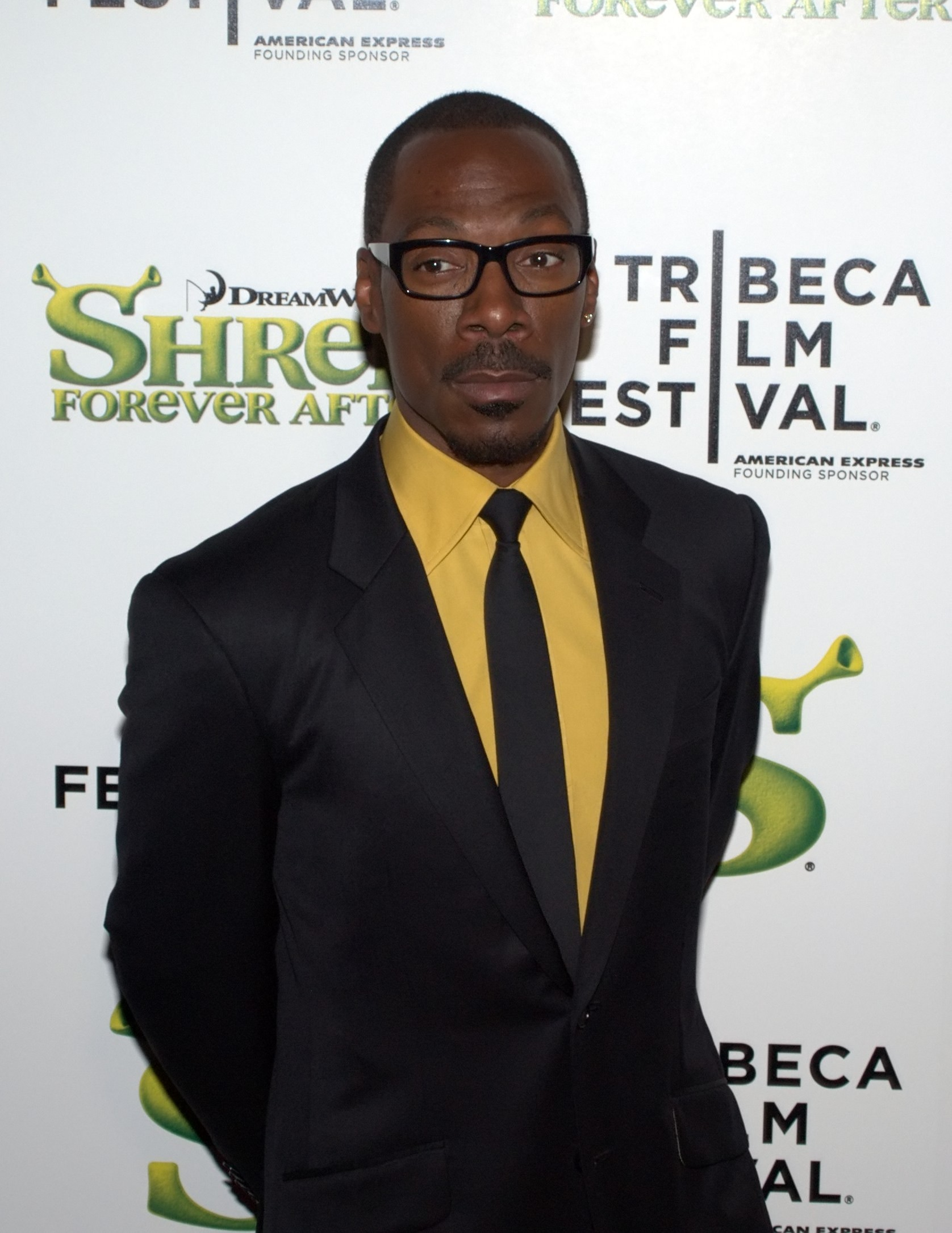
Eddie Murphy voices Donkey in the Shrek film series.

=== Shrek (2001) ===
Donkey made his debut in the 2001 film Shrek at a sale of mythical characters from old fairy tales, being sold to the evil Lord Farquaad's knights. Donkey's special power was his ability to talk, which his owner, an old woman, tried to capitalize on. Following a lucky escape, he befriends Shrek, who, although annoyed by Donkey's non-stop chatter, slowly and reluctantly develops an affection for him.

Donkey requests to stay with Shrek since he has no one else. At first, Shrek refuses, before finally giving in, although he only allows him to stay outside of his house for one night. Donkey denies any involvement when Shrek finds all the creatures from fairy tales living in his swamp. The creatures admit that Lord Farquaad drove them out of that location. Donkey is the only one who is prepared to lead him, and since he knows where Farquaad is, Shrek decides to accompany him.

However, when they arrive, Farquaad has his men try to kill Shrek in an arena to find the perfect champion to find and bring him back Princess Fiona, whom he wants to make his bride. Donkey and Shrek defeat Farquaad's men, and Farquaad decides to have Shrek be his champion instead. However, Shrek shows no interest and only demands his swamp back. When Farquaad offers Shrek a deal to return him his swamp if he agrees to go on the quest, Shrek agrees, and Donkey follows Shrek on his quest to find Fiona. While coming to the castle, Donkey unintentionally catches the unwanted attention of the fire-breathing dragon guarding the Princess.

Shrek escapes, but Donkey is caught and cornered. Before the dragon attempts to doom him, he tries to avoid his fate by complimenting the dragon, whom he discovers is a female, and the dragon is greatly flattered by Donkey's compliments. She takes him to her lair to be intimate with him. However, Shrek rescues Donkey before things become too personal, and the two narrowly escape with the Princess before the dragon catches up.

One night, during camp, Donkey asks Shrek why he hates everyone so much, and Shrek angrily reveals that everyone judges him as a scary monster before getting to know him. Donkey acknowledges that he already knew that there was more to Shrek's character when they met. Donkey begins to notice a romance between Fiona and Shrek, despite their denials. The next night, Donkey goes inside a windmill to talk to the Princess, only to discover that she becomes an ogre herself after sunset. Shrek overhears them talking and misinterprets the conversation as Fiona insulting him. The next day, Shrek berates her for what she supposedly said, and Lord Farquaad comes to take her.

Donkey tries to clarify the whole situation to Shrek, who also angrily insults him. Hurt and enraged, Donkey claims his half of the swamp for his hard work helping him. The two get into a heated argument, whereupon Donkey finally explains that Fiona did not say that Shrek was ugly, and the two reconcile. Donkey then has the dragon, whom he reconnected with earlier, take him and Shrek to Fiona's wedding, where the dragon devours Farquaad. After Shrek saves Fiona, Donkey sings "I'm a Believer" at Shrek and Fiona's wedding reception and takes his love, Dragon, as his wife. On Shrek in the Swamp Karaoke Dance Party!, he sings "Baby Got Back" by Sir Mix-a-Lot.

=== Shrek 2 (2004) ===
Donkey as a stallion

Donkey first appears in the film, having been remaining at Shrek's house while Shrek and Fiona were away on their honeymoon. When they return, Shrek tells Donkey to leave, but Donkey is hesitant. Fiona suggests that he should return for Dragon's sake, but he then reveals that he is having troubles in his relationship with Dragon as she was acting strangely, but he could not determine the cause, so he decides to move back in with them. However, Shrek makes him leave.

As Shrek and Fiona begin to have a moment, Donkey abruptly returns and interrupts, claiming that a chariot of royal men has arrived. A messenger appears and tells the newlywed couple that Fiona's parents have invited them to a royal ball to celebrate their marriage, as well as for her father to give his royal blessing. Shrek is completely hesitant to accept, as he knows that her parents will never accept them as Ogres, though he eventually gives up and goes. He and Fiona are accompanied by Donkey to the Far Far Away kingdom, who repeatedly asks, "Are we there yet?" whilst Shrek and Fiona keep answering no.

He then meets Puss in Boots and becomes jealous as he is spending a lot of time with Shrek. By the end of the film, they are great friends. At one point in the film, he reveals that he was the donkey traded by Jack for the magic beans, which greatly offended him. He and Shrek ended up drinking the "Happily Ever After" potion from the Fairy Godmother's workshop and while Shrek transformed into a handsome human, Donkey became a magnificently bred and handsome white stallion (albeit with the same buck teeth and voice, and on the bottle it read that the potion is not for those with nervous disorders, after which Shrek and everyone else stares at Donkey as it is strongly hinted that Donkey has one, but he remains clueless as to the reason of why everyone is staring at him).

Shrek and Puss ride Donkey back to the castle. When Shrek goes inside, Fiona (who had also changed back to human form) comes running out to find Shrek. Donkey then explains why they changed, and that Shrek went inside looking for her. However, Shrek comes back outside heartbroken after Fiona went back in, as Charming and Fairy Godmother beat them both to it: Charming tricking Fiona into thinking he is Shrek, and Fairy Godmother convincing Shrek that Fiona is better off with Charming. Shrek, Donkey and Puss lament in a bar called the Poison Apple, only to discover Fiona's father Harold secretly talking to Fairy Godmother, revealing the scam. Unfortunately, they are both caught when Donkey's talking habits cause him to accidentally blurt out, completely exposing them. They are eventually caught and captured by Godmother's men and are arrested. However, the other fairy tale creatures witness this and break them out, and Gingy has the Muffin Man create a giant, Godzilla-sized Gingerbread man called Mongo, whom Donkey helps lead to the castle. They succeed in getting in, but Mongo is defeated by the castle's guards.

After the Fairy Godmother is defeated, and the trio finished their mission with victory, both Donkey and Shrek return to their normal forms. Donkey seemed to be quite disappointed at returning to his original form, although Shrek told Donkey he still sees Donkey as "a noble steed." Donkey later sings "Livin' la Vida Loca" along with Puss during the party. After the credits, Donkey and Dragon are reunited, and he meets their newborn children, Dronkeys. Upon seeing his new kids, Donkey rejoices, although he also ends up exclaiming: "I gotta get a job!". He later sings "Disco Inferno" on Far Far Away Idol.

=== Shrek the Third (2007) ===
Donkey is enjoying fatherhood in Shrek the Third, and he is still first and foremost Shrek's sidekick and closest friend. When Far Far Away is in need of a new king, Donkey ventures off with Shrek in search of Fiona's cousin Arthur Pendragon, known simply as Artie, at the Worcestershire boarding school where he resides. In their magical transport back to Far Far Away (aided by a slightly off-kilter Merlin), Donkey and Puss accidentally switch bodies.

Puss finds Donkey's quadrupedal form hideous, while Donkey can't figure out how Puss can walk with such fancy accoutrements. They are forced to put their differences aside in order to save Far Far Away from a vindictive Prince Charming. After Charming is defeated, Merlin comes to change them back, but accidentally switches their tails (in the next scene, their tails have been corrected as well). He later is seen playing with Shrek's newborn ogre triplets.

Donkey is last seen in the credits performing "Thank You (Falettinme Be Mice Elf Agin)", along with Puss, to the ogre triplets.

=== Shrek Forever After (2010) ===
In the fourth film, Donkey brings his Dronkeys over to Shrek's swamp often, much to Shrek's annoyance at the ensuing daily chaos. Along with Shrek's other friends, he unknowingly irritates him to the point where he lashes out, ruining the ogre triplets' birthday party.

In Rumplestiltskin's alternate universe, Donkey first meets Shrek when he pulls a wagon the ogre is imprisoned in, and is forced to sing (reminiscent of a car stereo) by the witches, who whip him to change songs. After being taken to Rumplestiltskin, Shrek escapes and takes Donkey with him, much to the latter's chagrin. At first, Donkey fears Shrek and runs away, but returns after seeing Shrek cry over his babies' toy. Having never seen an ogre cry before, Donkey decides to trust Shrek and befriends him.

Donkey also proves to be highly intelligent, and helps Shrek find a loophole in Rumplestiltskin's contract, comparing Shrek's situation to The Twilight Zone. The duo meet Fiona, Puss, and the rebellion of ogres in the woods, and Donkey befriends Puss in Boots and the ogres as well. Donkey later saves Shrek and Fiona from the Pied Piper (at Puss' urging), and then leads the assault on Rumplestiltskin's castle. He also attempts to seduce the Dragon, having learned from Shrek that she is his wife in the other reality, to stop her from eating Shrek and Fiona, but he fails to do so. Luckily, none of them are harmed. After Rumplestiltskin is defeated, Donkey sadly watches as Shrek begins to turn into pixie dust when his time is up.

In the ending, with reality restored, Donkey celebrates Shrek's children's birthday. Later on, he is seen with Dragon, who playfully gobbles him up. Finally, he and other characters make mud angels.

== Other appearances ==
Donkey appears in the following works:

- Father of the Pride (2004). Voiced by Eddie Murphy.
  - Two Donkeys appeared: One Donkey's stunt double and the other being the actual Donkey. In this episode, Donkey is portrayed as an arrogant and self-centered actor, who plays his Shrek counterpart in the film series. He mistakenly claims that Shrek the Third is coming out in 2006.
- Shrek the Halls (2007). Voiced by Eddie Murphy, in which Donkey helps Shrek get into the Christmas spirit.
- Scared Shrekless (2010). Voiced by Dean Edwards, marking the first time Murphy did not return for the role. A Halloween special where Shrek challenges his friends to spend the night in Lord Farquaad's castle while telling scary stories.
- Shrek the Musical (2008-). The role originated on Broadway by Tony Award nominee Daniel Breaker. Alan Mingo Jr. plays the role on the United States national tour, and Richard Blackwood plays the role in the West End production.
- Puss in Boots: The Last Wish (2022). The latest installment and spin-off of the Shrek franchise. Donkey is briefly seen in one of Puss' flashbacks during his first battle with Death.
- Donkey is the focus of the Donkey Live! attraction at the Universal Studios Singapore theme park. The show is a digital puppetry presentation in which Donkey, along with a live actor, interacts with the audience in the format of a stand-up comedy performance.
- Donkey appears with Shrek and Fiona, along with other animated characters, in the DreamWorks theatrical "curtain raiser" sequence that runs before DreamWorks Animation films.
- A spinoff film, simply titled Donkey, will be released on June 30, 2028. It will be a prequel to the Shrek series, serving as an origin story for Donkey.

== Character development ==
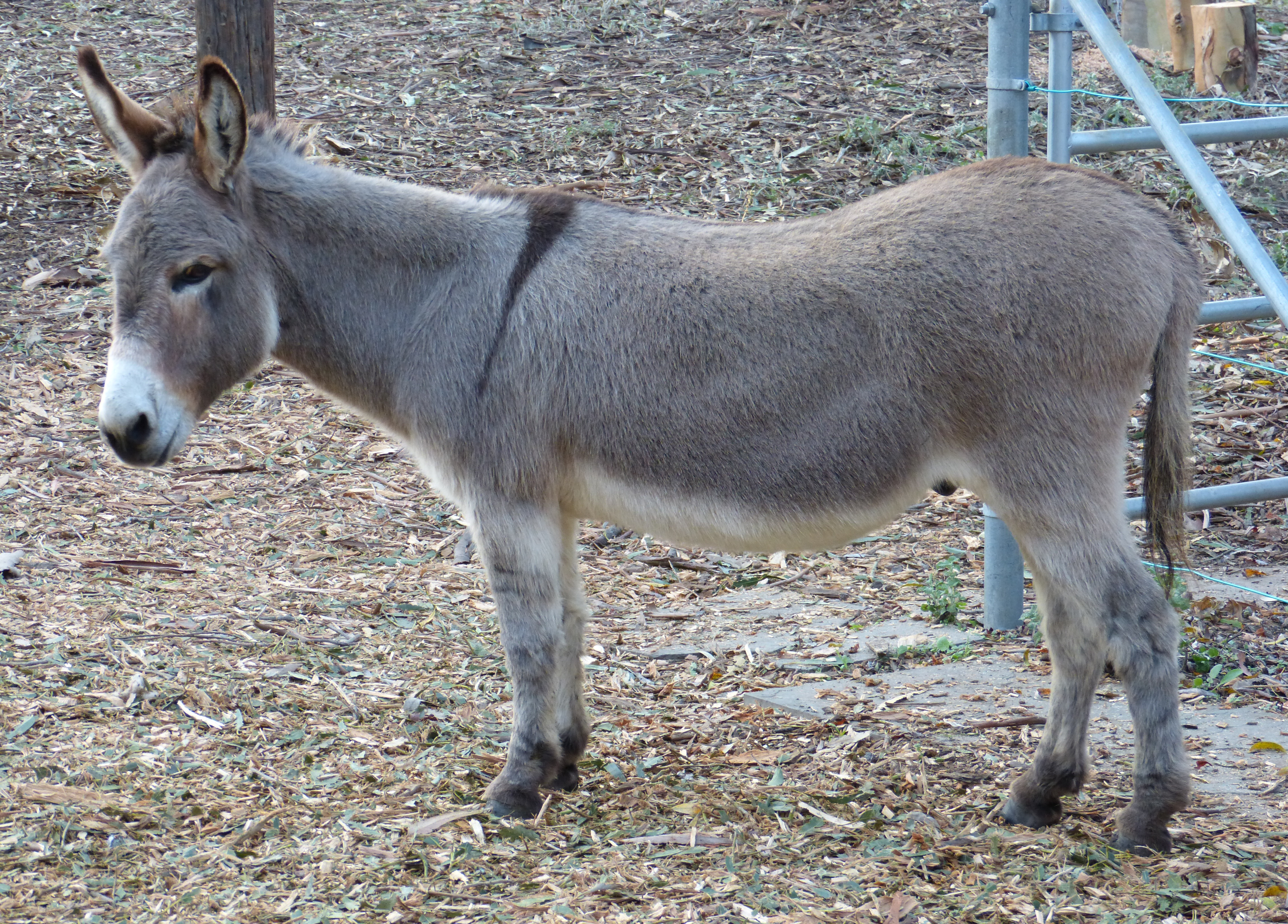
Perry, a miniature donkey in Palo Alto, served as the uncredited model for Donkey in the Shrek animated film franchise for $75.

Donkey was modeled after Perry (1994 – 2025), a miniature donkey who lived in Cornelius Bol Park in Palo Alto, California, after a failed career working with polo ponies. In 1999, animator Rex Grignon paid $75 to bring a group of animators to the pasture for several hours to observe and record Perry, using this data to create the Donkey character. Grignon worked for Pacific Data Images, which had been contracted by DreamWorks Animation.

"It's evident if you know Perry and watch the movie that it's him. It's amazing how much of our donkey is in Donkey, the way he flips his head when he's mad at Shrek, the way he trots."
– Dr. Jenny Kiralti, Perry's lead handler at the Barron Park Donkey Project

Perry's role in Shrek is uncredited and has been treated as an urban legend in Palo Alto. In 2024, law students at nearby Stanford University campaigned for DreamWorks to recognize Perry but did not receive a response.

In 2024, Perry was 29 years old (elderly for a donkey) and faced costly medical treatment for several age-related conditions. Local community organizing led the Palo Alto City Council to approve a $10,000 grant for care costs of such a famous donkey, though there was debate about whether it was financially responsible to give that much money to a donkey.

Perry died on January 2, 2025, at the age of 30. He was euthanized due to laminitis, a condition that caused intense pain in his heels.

== Reception ==
The donkey is a traditional character in folktales, serving as the fool who exposes the foolishness of other characters. An example of this is Bottom from A Midsummer Night's Dream. Donkey's characterization was praised by critics, calling him "hilarious" and "the highlight of the film". He represents an instinctual wisdom or "gut knowledge" that is essential to helping both Shrek and Fiona. His folk wisdom breaks through Shrek's layers of masculinity to help him integrate better with other people, including women.

Nevertheless, due to being voiced by Eddie Murphy, Donkey was noted as being similar to black sidekicks paired with white male stars in films such as Lethal Weapon (1987) and Die Hard (1988). He has been criticized as drawing on racial stereotypes of African Americans, both as a sidekick and due to his cowardly, comedic personality. Murphy's casting as a "servile" beast of burden was condemned for its racist undertones.

== See also ==
- The Donkey (fairy tale)
