= Shrek (franchise) =

DreamWorks Animation media franchise

- Created by: Ted Elliott; Terry Rossio; Joe Stillman; Roger S. H. Schulman
- Original work: Shrek (2001)
- Owners: DreamWorks Animation (Universal Pictures (Note: DreamWorks Pictures, DreamWorks Animation's former parent company and distribution partner, distributed the first two films, while Paramount Pictures distributed the third and fourth films, as well as spinoff Puss in Boots as part of DreamWorks' distribution deal with the studio. The distribution rights to future Shrek movies would move to Universal Studios following the acquisition; the first to be distributed by the studio was Puss in Boots: The Last Wish (2022).))
- Years: 2001–present
- Based on: Shrek! by William Steig

Films and television
- Films: Main series: Shrek (2001); Shrek 2 (2004); Shrek the Third (2007); Shrek Forever After (2010); Shrek 5 (2027); Spin-offs: Puss in Boots (2011); Puss in Boots: The Last Wish (2022); Donkey (2028)
- Television series: The Adventures of Puss in Boots (2015–2018)
- Television specials: Shrek the Halls (2007); Scared Shrekless (2010)

Theatrical presentations
- Musical: Shrek the Musical (2008)

Games
- Video games: Fairy Tale Freakdown (2001); Shrek (2001); Treasure Hunt (2002); Hassle at the Castle (2002); Super Party (2002); Shrek 2 (2004); SuperSlam (2005); Smash n' Crash Racing (2006); Shrek the Third (2007); Ogres & Dronkeys (2007); Shrek n' Roll (2007); Shrek Forever After (2010); Fruit Ninja (2011); Puss in Boots (2011)

Audio
- Soundtracks: List of songs featured in Shrek

Miscellaneous
- Theme park attractions: Shrek 4-D (2003–present); Enchanted Airways (2010–present); Shrek's Faire Faire Away (2012–2023); Puss in Boots' Giant Journey (2015–present); DreamWorks Tours (2015–present); Shrek & Fiona's Happily Ogre After (2026–present); Shrek's Swamp Rompin' Stomp (2026–present); Shrek's Swamp Splash & Smash (2026–present); Swings Over Del Mar (2026–present); Mama Luna's Adopt a Kitty Day! (2026–present)
- ^{*} Shrek 4-D is also known as Shrek 3-D on the DVD release, and The Ghost of Lord Farquaad on the Netflix release.

Shrek is an American media franchise of DreamWorks Animation, based on William Steig's 1990 picture book Shrek!. The series primarily focuses on Shrek, a grouchy ogre, who begrudgingly accepts a quest to rescue a princess, resulting in him finding friends and going on many subsequent adventures in a Medieval, Early Modern, and fairy tale Europe.

The franchise includes four animated films: Shrek (2001), Shrek 2 (2004), Shrek the Third (2007), and Shrek Forever After (2010), with a fifth film, Shrek 5, currently in production for a June 2027 release. A short 4-D film, Shrek 4-D, which originally was a theme park ride, was released in 2003. Two television specials, the Christmas television special Shrek the Halls (2007) and the Halloween television special Scared Shrekless (2010), have also been produced. Two spin-off films were made centered around the character Puss in Boots: 2011's Puss in Boots and its sequel, 2022's The Last Wish. Additionally, a stage musical adaptation was created and played on Broadway for more than a year (2008–2010).

In May 2010, The New York Times described the principal Shrek characters as "brilliantly realized" and said "nearly a decade after the first Shrek film they remain as vital and engaging fusions of image, personality, and voice as any characters in the history of animation." The series was a financial success, becoming the 18th highest-grossing film franchise of all time, the second highest-grossing animated franchise, as well one of the highest-grossing media franchises of all time.

== Films ==
Film	U.S. release date	Directed by	Screenplay by	Story by	Produced by
Main series
Shrek	May 18, 2001	Andrew Adamson and Vicky Jenson	Ted Elliott, Terry Rossio, Joe Stillman and Roger S. H. Schulman		Aron Warner, John H. Williams and Jeffrey Katzenberg
Shrek 2	May 19, 2004	Andrew Adamson, Kelly Asbury and Conrad Vernon	Andrew Adamson, Joe Stillman, J. David Stem and David N. Weiss	Andrew Adamson	Aron Warner, David Lipman and John H. Williams
Shrek the Third	May 18, 2007	Chris Miller Co-director: Raman Hui	Jeffrey Price, Peter S. Seaman, Chris Miller and Aron Warner	Andrew Adamson	Aron Warner
Shrek Forever After	May 21, 2010	Mike Mitchell	Josh Klausner and Darren Lemke	Josh Klausner and Darren Lemke	Gina Shay and Teresa Cheng
Shrek 5	June 30, 2027	Walt Dohrn and Conrad Vernon Co-director: Brad Ableson	Michael McCullers	Michael McCullers	Gina Shay and Chris Meledandri
Spin-offs
Puss in Boots	October 28, 2011	Chris Miller	Tom Wheeler	Brian Lynch, Will Davies and Tom Wheeler	Joe M. Aguilar and Latifa Ouaou
Puss in Boots: The Last Wish	December 21, 2022	Joel Crawford Co-director: Januel P. Mercado	Paul Fisher and Tommy Swerdlow	Tommy Swerdlow and Tom Wheeler	Mark Swift
Donkey	June 30, 2028	Charlie Bean Co-director: Matt Flynn	TBA	TBA	Rebecca Huntley

=== Main films ===
==== Shrek (2001) ====
Shrek, a solitary ogre, is angered when fairy tale creatures are sent to live in his swamp ordered by Lord Farquaad. He befriends a talking donkey named Donkey, and they set off to meet with Farquaad.

The lord needs Princess Fiona to marry him so he will become the king of Duloc. When Shrek and Donkey visit him, they are forced to rescue her from an enormous fire-breathing dragon named Dragon in exchange for Shrek's swamp being vacated. The Dragon turns out to be female, and after a minute or two falls in love with Donkey.

Donkey, Shrek, and Fiona escape, and Dragon chases them. Once Shrek and Donkey rescue Fiona, they take her back to Lord Farquaad. Along the way, Shrek begins to fall in love with Fiona. Donkey finds out from Fiona that she is cursed and turns into an ogre at night. The only way the curse can be broken is by true love's first kiss. Fiona and Farquaad have a marriage ceremony, but they are interrupted by Shrek, who tells Fiona he loves her.

Donkey and Dragon enter, and Dragon eats Farquaad. Shrek and Fiona kiss and Fiona is permanently turned into an ogre. Shrek gets his swamp back, and the two marry there. After a karaoke party, the newlyweds set off on their honeymoon.

==== Shrek 2 (2004) ====
The second film opens with Prince Charming on a quest to rescue Princess Fiona from the Dragon. When he gets there, he finds the wolf from Little Red Riding Hood and The Three Little Pigs in Fiona's bed. He asks the wolf where Fiona is and the wolf tells him that she is on her honeymoon with Shrek. Once Shrek and Fiona return from their honeymoon, they find Donkey in the swamp who tells them he and Dragon are going through a rough patch. They then get invited to the land of Far Far Away by Fiona's parents who want to bless their marriage.

When they arrive, Shrek and Fiona are not what they expected. The Fairy Godmother and her son, Prince Charming, are trying to break up Shrek's marriage by making Fiona fall in love with Prince Charming. However it does not work and Shrek and Fiona stay together. Shrek and Donkey get a new sidekick called Puss in Boots. They have a lengthy quest to search the Fairy Godmother's cottage to get a love potion. Shrek and Donkey drink the potion and they become something quite unexpected. Shrek becomes human and Donkey becomes a horse. Since Shrek drank the potion, it also affected Fiona as she woke up to seeing her human form once again.

At the end of the film, King Harold reverts to a frog after being struck with the Fairy Godmother's magic, and gives Shrek and Fiona his blessing. After Fiona tells Shrek she loves him just the way he is, they revert to ogres.

==== Shrek the Third (2007) ====
Shrek and Fiona are reluctantly reigning over Far, Far Away during King Harold's prolonged illness. The King promises that if they can find Fiona's cousin Artie, he will make him the next in line, so both Shrek and Fiona would not have to run the country after his death. As Shrek, Donkey and Puss set off to find Artie, Fiona reveals she is pregnant.

Shrek is shocked as he believes he will not be a good father and will ruin his child's life. This is reinforced by his relationship with his own father, where "he tried to eat me." After finding Artie, Artie is frightened of being king, and they end up on an island where they meet Artie's former magic teacher, Merlin. Meanwhile, Charming plots to overthrow Artie and become king, but this is foiled by Shrek.

The film ends with Shrek and Fiona caring for their newborn ogre triplets.

==== Shrek Forever After (2010) ====
Shrek has become a domesticated family ogre, living happily with Princess Fiona and the triplets. Instead of scaring villagers away like he used to, a reluctant Shrek now agrees to autograph pitchforks. Longing for the days when he felt like a "real ogre", Shrek is tricked into signing a pact with the smooth-talking dealmaker Rumpelstiltskin. He agrees to trade a day from his childhood in exchange for a day to exist as a real ogre again. However, Shrek suddenly finds himself in a twisted, alternate reality where ogres are hunted, Rumplestiltskin is king, Puss is obese, and Shrek has never met Donkey or Fiona. Shrek discovers he unknowingly traded the day he was born and will not exist after the day is over.

Shrek becomes entangled with an underground resistance of ogres led by Fiona. Rumpelstiltskin places a bounty on Shrek's capture, offering the "deal of a lifetime" as a reward. The Pied Piper captures most of the resistance excluding Shrek and Fiona. Shrek, unable to win Fiona's affection, turns himself in and offers to trade his life to free the captured ogres. The recently released ogres go back to free Shrek and Fiona. As the twenty-four hours are almost up and Shrek lies dying, Fiona kisses him, breaking the deal and reverting everything back to normal. After finding himself back at his triplets' birthday party where he previously lost his temper and stormed out, Shrek joyfully reunites with his family and friends realizing he has everything he ever wanted.

=== Puss in Boots films ===
==== Puss in Boots (2011) ====
Puss in Boots is an animated American action comedy film that was released on October 28, 2011. The film is based on and follows the character Puss in Boots on his adventures with Kitty Softpaws and mastermind Humpty Dumpty.

==== Puss in Boots: The Last Wish (2022) ====
Puss in Boots: The Last Wish is the sequel to Puss in Boots, that was released on December 21, 2022.

In November 2012, executive producer Guillermo del Toro said that a couple of drafts for a sequel were already done, and that the director Chris Miller wanted to take Puss on an adventure to exotic places. In April 2014, Antonio Banderas, the voice of Puss, said that the work on the sequel had just begun. On June 12, 2014, the movie was titled Puss in Boots 2: Nine Lives & 40 Thieves. On February 26, 2019, it was confirmed that the sequel was still in development, and Bob Persichetti was set to direct the film. In August 2020, the name Puss in Boots: The Last Wish had been trademarked by DreamWorks, revealing the new title of the sequel. In March 2021, Joel Crawford replaced Persichetti as director, having previously helmed DreamWorks' The Croods: A New Age. Puss in Boots: The Last Wish was theatrically released on December 21, 2022, by Universal Pictures. The film was originally scheduled to be released on November 2, 2018, but was delayed a month to December 21, 2018, before cancellation. It was also scheduled to be released on September 23, 2022. The story takes place after Shrek Forever After and follows Puss, who has burned all but the last of his nine lives, on a quest to find the mystical Last Wish in order to restore his nine lives.

== Future ==
=== Shrek 5 (2027) ===
In June 2024, Murphy revealed that production on the film had commenced in January of the same year. He also stated that the film was expected to be released in 2025. On July 9, DreamWorks officially announced the release date for the film as July 1, 2026, with Myers, Murphy and Diaz returning, and Walt Dohrn set to direct. On January 10, 2025, the film was delayed to December 23, 2026. It was also announced that Conrad Vernon, co-director of Shrek 2, would return to direct the film alongside Dohrn. On August 11, 2025, the film was delayed to June 30, 2027.

=== Donkey (2028) ===
At the same time that Shrek 5 was revealed to be in development in April 2023, it was revealed that a spin-off prequel film revolving around Donkey was in development as well. In June 2024, Eddie Murphy announced that the project was officially greenlit by DreamWorks, and stated that it would begin production following the completion of Shrek 5.

In May 2025, it was revealed that Chris Meledandri would be producing the film and that Christopher Knights, voice of the Three Blind Mice, would be editing the film. In July 2025, Murphy stated that voice recording would commence in September and that the story would centered on his character, his dragon wife and their hybrid kids. He noted the film was expected to be released in 2028. In June 2026, the film was officially titled Donkey and was announced to be releasing on June 30, 2028. It was also announced that it would be directed by Charlie Bean, co-directed by Matt Flynn and produced by Rebecca Huntley. The story was revealed to be taking place before the first Shrek film.

== Short films ==
=== Shrek in the Swamp Karaoke Dance Party (2001) ===
Shrek in the Swamp Karaoke Dance Party is a three-minute musical short film included on home media releases of Shrek. It takes place during the last scene of Shrek (before Shrek and Fiona leave on their honeymoon), with the film's characters performing a medley of modern pop songs. Most of the voice cast from the film reprise their roles, with the exception of Eddie Murphy, who is replaced by Mark Moseley as Donkey.

=== Shrek 4-D (2003) ===
Shrek 4-D, also known as Shrek 3-D, Shrek 4D Adventure, Shrek's Never Before Seen Adventure, and The Ghost of Lord Farquaad, is a 4-D film/ride at various theme parks around the world. It premiered in 2003 at Universal Studios Hollywood, Universal Studios Florida, and Universal Studios Japan, and was released on DVD the following year. The short takes place right after the first Shrek film. Lord Farquaad returns from the dead to kidnap Princess Fiona and it is up to Shrek and Donkey to rescue her. The ride also opened at Warner Bros. Movie World in Australia on 2005, Movie Park Germany in 2008, and Universal Studios Singapore in 2010.

=== Donkey's Caroling Christmas-tacular (2010) ===
Donkey's Caroling Christmas-tacular (promoted as Donkey's Christmas Shrektacular) is a five-minute short which was released on December 7, 2010, with the Shrek: The Whole Story box set and Shrek Forever After.

This short takes place in the Candy Apple, the new version of the Poison Apple. Donkey suggests everyone sing Christmas carols. Donkey sings "It's the Most Wonderful Time of the Year". Shrek, Fiona, the Ogre children, and the army of ogres sing an ogre version of "Jingle Bells" (such as "Bug Cocoon, Lick the spoon. Try our cricket slurp"). Puss in Boots sings "Feliz Navidad", although he titles it "Fleas Navidad". Then everyone sings "Jingle Bell Rock" as "Fairy Tale Rock".

=== Shrek's Yule Log (2010) ===
Shrek's Yule Log is a 30-minute short released on December 7, 2010, featured on both the Donkey's Christmas Shrektacular DVD and the Shrek Forever After Blu-ray.

The short takes place inside Shrek's house, with the fireplace as the only place seen throughout the entire short. Shrek prevents Rumpelstiltskin from dousing the fire, Donkey does the same eye gag (seen from Shrek Forever After), Fiona puts out cookies for Santa, and Puss puts on weight from cookies and cookie dough. Other characters such as Gingy, Pinocchio, the Three Little Pigs, Cookie, the Ogre Triplets, the Dronkeys, and Pied Piper appear.

=== Thriller Night (2011) ===
Thriller Night is a six-minute short film parody of Michael Jackson's music video Thriller. It was directed by Gary Trousdale, and released on September 13, 2011, on the Scared Shrekless DVD. It was released on DVD and Blu-ray on August 28, 2012, as a part of Shrek's Thrilling Tales (DreamWorks Spooky Stories). None of the original main voice actors reprised their roles and are replaced by their replacement voice actors, with the exception of Dean Edwards, who reprises Donkey from Scared Shrekless.

Deceased characters such as Lord Farquaad, Mongo, Rumpelstiltskin, Fifi, Fairy Godmother, Prince Charming and King Harold in his frog form appear as zombies. A 3D version of the short was added in October 2011 to the Nintendo Video service for Nintendo 3DS owners.

=== The Pig Who Cried Werewolf (2011) ===
The Pig Who Cried Werewolf is a six-minute 3D Halloween short film, directed by Gary Trousdale and released on October 4, 2011, for a limited time, exclusively on the Nintendo Video service on Nintendo 3DS. It was released on DVD and Blu-ray on August 28, 2012, as a part of Shrek's Thrilling Tales (DreamWorks Spooky Stories).

The Three Little Pigs find themselves in trouble when they ignore the warning signs of a new neighbor moving in next door who takes on a ferocious form during a full moon.

=== Puss in Boots: The Three Diablos (2012) ===
Puss in Boots: The Three Diablos is a 13-minute animated short film, directed by Raman Hui, and was released on the DVD and Blu-ray releases of Puss in Boots on February 24, 2012. The short tells a story of Puss in Boots on a mission to recover a princess's stolen ruby from the notorious French thief, the Whisperer. Reluctantly accompanied by three little kittens, The Three Diablos, Puss must tame them before they endanger the mission.

=== Puss in Boots: The Trident (2023) ===
Puss in Boots: The Trident is a 4-minute animated short film, directed by Matt Flynn, and was released on the digital release of Puss in Boots: The Last Wish: Collector's Edition on February 21, 2023, and on the 4K, Blu-ray, and DVD releases of Puss in Boots: The Last Wish on February 28.

== Television and interactive specials ==
=== Far Far Away Idol (2004) ===
Far Far Away Idol is an interactive five-minute short (but with multiple endings), released on November 5, 2004, as an extra on the Shrek 2 DVD and VHS. It is based on American Idol and guest stars Simon Cowell. Taking place right after Shrek 2 ends, the film's supporting characters hold a singing competition, with Shrek, Fiona, and Simon Cowell as the judges.

=== Shrek the Halls (2007) ===
Shrek the Halls is a 22-minute Christmas-themed television special, set after the events of Shrek the Third but before the events of Shrek Forever After. It follows Shrek, who has never celebrated Christmas before, attempting to make the perfect day for his family. It premiered on the American television network ABC on November 28, 2007.

=== Scared Shrekless (2010) ===
Scared Shrekless is a 21-minute Halloween-themed television special set after the events of Shrek Forever After. Shrek challenges Donkey, Puss in Boots, and his other fairy tale friends to spend the night in Lord Farquaad's haunted castle, telling scary stories to see who can resist becoming scared and stay the longest. The special premiered on the American television network NBC on October 28, 2010.

=== Puss in Book: Trapped in an Epic Tale (2017) ===
Puss in Book: Trapped in an Epic Tale is an interactive special developed by DreamWorks Animation Television which debuted on Netflix in 2017, featuring the character Puss in Boots. It is Netflix's first attempt at interactive television: during the program, the viewer is given points while using their remote control or other device to decide how the narrative should proceed.

== Television series ==
=== The Adventures of Puss in Boots (2015–2018) ===
A television series, starring Puss from the Shrek franchise, debuted on Netflix on January 16, 2015.

== Web series ==
From 2014 to 2016, the Universal Kids YouTube channel (formerly known as DreamWorksTV and later Peacock Kids) produced several web series, including New Shrek, New Puss in Boots, Swamp Talk, and Epic Cat Battles With Puss In Boots. These were later released separately on the Peacock website.

== Production ==
Despite the advances in computing power over the 2000s decade, the increasing usage of novel techniques like global illumination, physics simulation, and 3D demanded ever more CPU hours to render the films. DreamWorks Animation noticed that every Shrek film took roughly twice the CPU hours than the previous film and thus labeled this trend as "Shrek's law". Similar to "Moore's law" the Shrek's law says, "The CPU render hours needed to complete production on a theatrical sequel will double compared to the amount of time needed on the previous film."

In 2001, Shrek required approximately 5 million CPU render hours. In 2004, Shrek 2 required over 10 million CPU render hours. In 2007, Shrek the Third required over 20 million CPU render hours, and the 2010 3D release of Shrek Forever After demanded more than 50 million CPU render hours on account of rendering an increased amount of frames. Puss in Boots, which was released only one year after the previous Shrek film, utilized 63 million render hours.

== Reception ==
=== Box office performance ===
Film	Release date	Box office gross			Box office ranking		Budget	Ref(s)
Film	Release date	North America	Other territories	Worldwide	US and Canada	Worldwide	Budget	Ref(s)
Main series
Shrek	May 18, 2001	$268,349,831	$220,279,678	$488,629,509	#134	#260	$60 million	
Shrek 2	May 19, 2004	$444,854,717	$487,536,387	$932,406,549	#30	#72	$150 million	
Shrek the Third	May 18, 2007	$322,719,944	$485,586,147	$808,308,862	#91	#105	$160 million	
Shrek Forever After	May 21, 2010	$238,736,787	$513,864,080	$752,600,867	#166	#126	$165 million	
Spin-offs
Puss in Boots	October 28, 2011	$149,260,504	$405,726,973	$554,987,477	#428	#212	$130 million	
Puss in Boots: The Last Wish	December 21, 2022	$186,090,535	$295,667,128	$481,757,663	#276	#270	$90–110 million	
Total		$1,605,641,838	$2,413,230,535	$4,018,872,373	#6	#8	$755–775 million	

=== Critical and public response ===
Critical and public response of Shrek and Puss in Boots films
Film	Critical		Public
Film	Rotten Tomatoes	Metacritic	CinemaScore
Main series
Shrek	89% (214 reviews)	84 (34 reviews)	A
Shrek 2	89% (234 reviews)	75 (40 reviews)	A
Shrek the Third	41% (209 reviews)	58 (35 reviews)	B+
Shrek Forever After	58% (195 reviews)	58 (35 reviews)	A
Spin-offs
Puss in Boots	85% (150 reviews)	65 (24 reviews)	A−
Puss in Boots: The Last Wish	95% (196 reviews)	73 (29 reviews)	A

=== Academy Awards ===
Award	Main series				Spin-offs	
Award	Shrek	Shrek 2	Shrek the Third	Shrek Forever After	Puss in Boots	Puss in Boots: The Last Wish
Adapted Screenplay	Nominated					
Animated Feature	Won	Nominated			Nominated	
Original Song		Nominated				

=== Home video sales ===
Shrek and Shrek 2 have collectively raised over $1.6 billion in home video sales. Together with the rest of the films in the series with combined editions, the franchise's total revenue is over $2 billion.

== Cast and characters ==
List indicator

This section includes characters who will appear or have appeared in in the franchise.

- An empty grey cell indicates the character was not in the film, or that the character's official presence has not yet been confirmed.
- ^{A} indicates an appearance through previously recorded material.
- ^{S} indicates an appearance as a character's singing voice.
- ^{Y} indicates an appearance as a younger version of the character.

Character	Main films					Short films							Attraction	Television specials		Spin-off films			Television series
Character	Shrek	Shrek 2	Shrek the Third	Shrek Forever After	Shrek 5	Shrek in the Swamp Karaoke Dance Party	Far Far Away Idol	Donkey's Caroling Christmas-tacular	Thriller Night	The Pig Who Cried Werewolf	Puss in Boots: The Three Diablos	Puss in Boots: The Trident	Shrek 4-D	Shrek the Halls	Scared Shrekless	Puss in Boots	Puss in Boots: The Last Wish	Donkey	The Adventures of Puss in Boots
Principal characters
Shrek	Mike Myers	Mike Myers	Mike Myers	Mike Myers	Mike Myers	Mike Myers	Mike Myers Michael Gough^{S}	Mike Myers	Michael Gough				Mike Myers	Mike Myers	Mike Myers		Silent cameo		
Donkey	Eddie Murphy	Eddie Murphy	Eddie Murphy	Eddie Murphy	Eddie Murphy	Mark Moseley	Eddie Murphy	Eddie Murphy	Dean Edwards				Eddie Murphy	Eddie Murphy	Dean Edwards		Silent cameo	Eddie Murphy	
Princess Fiona	Cameron Diaz	Cameron Diaz	Cameron Diaz	Cameron Diaz	Cameron Diaz	Cameron Diaz	Cameron Diaz Renee Sandstorm^{S}	Cameron Diaz	Holly Fields				Cameron Diaz	Cameron Diaz	Cameron Diaz				
Lord Farquaad	John Lithgow		John Lithgow^{A}	Cameo in end credits		John Lithgow			Sean Bishop				John Lithgow		Silent cameo				
Puss in Boots		Antonio Banderas	Antonio Banderas	Antonio Banderas			Antonio Banderas	Antonio Banderas	André Sogliuzzo		Antonio Banderas	Eric Bauza		Antonio Banderas	Antonio Banderas	Antonio Banderas	Antonio Banderas		Eric Bauza
King Harold		John Cleese	John Cleese	John Cleese					Silent cameo										
Queen Lillian		Julie Andrews	Julie Andrews	Julie Andrews					Silent cameo										
Fairy Godmother		Jennifer Saunders	Photograph	Cameo in end credits					Pinky Turzo										
Prince Charming	Mentioned	Rupert Everett	Rupert Everett	Cameo in end credits			Randy Crenshaw		Silent cameo						Sean Bishop				
Arthur "Artie" Pendragon			Justin Timberlake																
Rumpelstiltskin			Conrad Vernon	Walt Dohrn				Walt Dohrn	Walt Dohrn										
Felicia, Fergus, and Farkle			Jordan Alexander Hauser	Jordan Alexander Hauser	Zendaya Marcello Hernandez Skyler Gisondo			Miles Christopher Bakshi						Miles Christopher Bakshi	Miles Christopher Bakshi				
Felicia, Fergus, and Farkle			Dante James Hauser	Ollie Mitchell	Zendaya Marcello Hernandez Skyler Gisondo			Miles Christopher Bakshi						Miles Christopher Bakshi	Miles Christopher Bakshi				
Felicia, Fergus, and Farkle			Jasper Johannes Andrews	Miles Christopher Bakshi	Zendaya Marcello Hernandez Skyler Gisondo			Nina Zoe Bakshi						Nina Zoe Bakshi	Nina Zoe Bakshi				
Felicia, Fergus, and Farkle			Zachary James Bernard	Nina Zoe Bakshi	Zendaya Marcello Hernandez Skyler Gisondo			Ollie Mitchell						Dante James Hauser	Nina Zoe Bakshi				
Humpty Dumpty													Silent cameo			Zach Galifianakis			
Kitty Softpaws												Margo Rey				Salma Hayek	Salma Hayek		
Perrito												Harvey Guillén					Harvey Guillén		
Supporting characters
Gingerbread Man	Conrad Vernon	Conrad Vernon	Conrad Vernon	Conrad Vernon	Conrad Vernon	Conrad Vernon	Conrad Vernon James McDonough^{S}	Conrad Vernon	Conrad Vernon				Conrad Vernon	Conrad Vernon	Conrad Vernon		Conrad Vernon		
Pinocchio	Cody Cameron	Cody Cameron	Cody Cameron	Cody Cameron	Cody Cameron	Cody Cameron	Cody Cameron	Cody Cameron	Cody Cameron				Cody Cameron	Cody Cameron	Cody Cameron		Cody Cameron		
The Three Little Pigs	Cody Cameron	Cody Cameron	Cody Cameron	Cody Cameron	Cody Cameron	Cody Cameron Sean Bishop	Cody Cameron	Cody Cameron	Cody Cameron	Cody Cameron			Cody Cameron	Cody Cameron	Cody Cameron				
Big Bad Wolf	Aron Warner	Aron Warner	Aron Warner	Aron Warner	TBA	Aron Warner	Aron Warner	Aron Warner	Silent role	Aron Warner			Silent role	Aron Warner	Aron Warner				
Three Blind Mice	Christopher Knights Simon J. Smith Mike Myers	Christopher Knights	Christopher Knights	Christopher Knights	Christopher Knights	Uncredited role	Randy Crenshaw	Christopher Knights	Silent role				Christopher Knights	Christopher Knights	Christopher Knights				
Magic Mirror	Chris Miller	Chris Miller		Chris Miller	Chris Miller	Chris Miller	Chris Miller						Chris Miller						
Thelonious	Christopher Knights			Cameo in end credits		Christopher Knights			Silent cameo				Christopher Knights						
Geppetto	Chris Miller			Chris Miller											Sean Bishop		Silent cameo		
Monsieur Hood	Vincent Cassel					Vincent Cassel													
Baby Bear	Bobby Block					Silent role						Samson Kayo					Samson Kayo		
Captain Hook		Tom Waits Nick Cave^{S}	Ian McShane	Silent cameo			Matt Mahaffey		Silent cameo										
Doris		Larry King Jonathan Ross (Note: Ross voiced Doris in the UK release.)	Larry King	Larry King			Larry King												
Muffin Man		Conrad Vernon	Conrad Vernon^{A}	Conrad Vernon											Conrad Vernon				
Mongo		Conrad Vernon							Conrad Vernon										
Jill		Latifa Ouaou								Silent cameo						Amy Sedaris			
Headless Horseman		Silent role	Conrad Vernon						Bobby Kimball										
Merlin			Eric Idle																
Mabel			Regis Philbin	Regis Philbin															
Snow White	Silent cameo	Mentioned	Amy Poehler Megan Hilty^{S}	Cameo in end credits		Silent role													
Cinderella	Silent cameo	Mentioned	Amy Sedaris	Cameo in end credits		Silent role													
Sleeping Beauty		Silent cameo	Cheri Oteri	Cameo in end credits															
Rapunzel		Mentioned	Maya Rudolph	Photograph															
Evil Queen			Susanne Blakeslee																
Lancelot			John Krasinski																
Stromboli			Chris Miller																
Brogan				Jon Hamm				Jon Hamm											
Cookie				Craig Robinson				Craig Robinson											
Gretched				Jane Lynch				Jane Lynch											
Pied Piper	Silent cameo			Jeremy Steig					Appeared										
Ohhh Cat																Bob Persichetti	Bob Persichetti		
Jack										Silent cameo						Billy Bob Thornton			
Imelda																Constance Marie	Silent cameo		
Death / Wolf																	Wagner Moura		
Big Jack Horner																	John Mulaney		
Goldilocks		Photograph										Florence Pugh					Florence Pugh Kailey Crawford^{Y}		
Papa Bear	Silent cameo					Silent role						Ray Winstone					Ray Winstone		
Mama Bear	Unknown					Silent role						Olivia Colman					Olivia Colman		
Ethical Bug																	Kevin McCann		

== Crew ==
Role	Main films					Spin-offs		
Role	Shrek	Shrek 2	Shrek the Third	Shrek Forever After	Shrek 5	Puss in Boots	Puss in Boots: The Last Wish	Donkey
Director(s)	Andrew Adamson; Vicky Jenson	Andrew Adamson; Kelly Asbury; Conrad Vernon	Chris Miller Co-Director: Raman Hui	Mike Mitchell	Walt Dohrn; Conrad Vernon Co-Director: Brad Ableson	Chris Miller	Joel Crawford Co-Director: Januel P. Mercado	Charlie Bean Co-Director: Matt Flynn
Producer(s)	Aron Warner; John H. Williams; Jeffrey Katzenberg	Aron Warner; David Lipman; John H. Williams	Aron Warner	Gina Shay; Teresa Cheng	Chris Meledandri; Gina Shay	Joe M. Aguilar; Latifa Ouaou	Mark Swift	Rebecca Huntley
Executive Producer(s)	Penney Finkelman Cox; Sandra Rabins	Jeffrey Katzenberg	Andrew Adamson; John H. Williams	Aron Warner; Andrew Adamson; John H. Williams	TBA	Andrew Adamson; Guillermo del Toro; Michelle Raimo Kuoyate	Andrew Adamson; Chris Meledandri	TBA
Writer(s)	Ted Elliott; Terry Rossio; Joe Stillman; Roger S.H. Schulman	Screenplay: Andrew Adamson; Joe Stillman; J. David Stem; David N. Weiss Story: Andrew Adamson	Screenplay: Jeffrey Price; Peter S. Seaman; Chris Miller; Aron Warner Story: Andrew Adamson	Josh Klausner; Darren Lemke	Michael McCullers	Screenplay: Tom Wheeler Story: Brian Lynch; Will Davies; Tom Wheeler	Screenplay: Paul Fisher; Tommy Swerdlow Story: Tommy Swerdlow; Tom Wheeler	TBA
Composer(s)	Harry Gregson-Williams; John Powell	Harry Gregson-Williams	Harry Gregson-Williams	Harry Gregson-Williams	John Powell	Henry Jackman	Heitor Pereira	TBA
Editor(s)	Sim Evan-Jones	Michael Andrews; Sim Evan-Jones	Michael Andrews	Nick Fletcher	TBA	Erika Dapkewicz (Note: Credited as Eric Dapkewicz; Dapkewicz came out as transgender and changed her name in the 2010s.)	James Ryan	TBA
Studio(s)	DreamWorks Animation; PDI/DreamWorks	DreamWorks Animation; PDI/DreamWorks	DreamWorks Animation; PDI/DreamWorks	DreamWorks Animation	DreamWorks Animation	DreamWorks Animation	DreamWorks Animation	DreamWorks Animation
Distributor(s)	DreamWorks Pictures	DreamWorks Pictures	Paramount Pictures	Paramount Pictures	Universal Pictures	Paramount Pictures	Universal Pictures	Universal Pictures

== Video games ==
- Shrek
- Shrek: Hassle at the Castle
- Shrek: Extra Large
- Shrek: Super Party
- Shrek 2
- Shrek SuperSlam
- Shrek Smash n' Crash Racing
- Shrek the Third
- Shrek n' Roll
- Madagascar Kartz
- Shrek Forever After
- DreamWorks Super Star Kartz

== Musical ==
Shrek the Musical is a musical based on the first film of the franchise. After a try out in Seattle, Washington, it began performances on Broadway from November 8, 2008, before opening on December 14. Despite mixed reviews, the musical received eight Tony Award nominations including Best Musical. At the time, the most expensive musical on Broadway ran for over a year and closed, at a loss, on January 3, 2010, after 478 performances.

A re-imagined version of the show ran as a tour of the United States from July 2010 to July 2011. The second tour launched in two months. A West End production opened in London, United Kingdom in June 2011, to positive reviews. It received five Laurence Olivier Award nominations including Best New Musical. A differently staged production ran in Israel in 2010, with international productions running since 2011 in Poland and Spain, and since 2012 in France. The show was soon to premiere in Brazil, Italy, Australia, and Philippines in 2012.

The title role was played by Brian d'Arcy James on Broadway, and Nigel Lindsay on the West End. Other notable performances include Amanda Holden (West End), Sutton Foster (Broadway) and Kimberley Walsh (West End) as Princess Fiona, Christopher Sieber (Broadway) and Nigel Harman (West End) as Lord Farquaad, and John Tartaglia (Broadway) as Pinocchio.

== Comics ==
Dark Horse Comics released in 2003 three thirty-two-page full-color comic books featuring Shrek, Donkey and Fiona, Shrek #1, Shrek #2, and Shrek #3. The comics were written by Mark Evanier and illustrated by Ramon Bachs and Raul Fernandez.

Ape Entertainment also released under its KiZoic label five full-color comic books, a fifty-two-page prequel to Shrek Forever After titled Shrek (2010), and four thirty-two-page books: Shrek #1 (2010), Shrek #2 (2010), Shrek #3 (2011), and Shrek #4 (2011).

== Attractions ==
Far Far Away is one of the seven themed lands in Universal Studios Singapore, and it consists of many locations from the Shrek franchise, including the forty-meter-tall Far Far Away Castle.

Shrek's Faire Faire Away was one of the three areas at the DreamWorks Experience-themed land at the Australian theme park Dreamworld. It opened in 2012 and it consisted of a fixed arm, rotating plane ride Dronkey Flyers, a kite flier Gingy's Glider, a swing ride Puss in Boots Sword Swing and a carousel Shrek's Ogre-Go-Round. The area was replaced by a section of Kenny and Belinda's Dreamland in early 2023.

A Shrek-themed attraction, called DreamWork's Tours Shrek's Adventure! London, opened in 2015 at London County Hall as the first of six attractions initially planned over nine years. This "Immersive Tunnel" from Simworx is built in collaboration with Merlin Entertainments. The 1,900 square metres (20,000 sq ft) live interactive walkthrough adventure presents an original story written by DWA, along with a character courtyard, also featuring characters from several other DreamWorks Animation's franchises.

Multiple Shrek Water attractions opened at DreamWorks Water Park on October 1, 2020, these attractions are called Far Far a Bay Wavepool, Forbidden Waters Hot Tubs, Dragon and Donkey's Flight, Swamp & Splash, Shrek's Sinkhole Slammer. Dreamworks Waterpark also includes themed decorations that are balloons of Shrek and Donkey hanging from the ceiling of the waterpark.

Universal Studios Florida's DreamWorks Land includes a recreation of Shrek's cottage, Shrek's Swamp Meet, Shrek's Swamp for Little Ogres, Mama Luna Feline Fiesta, King Harold's Swamp Symphony, and the kiosk Swamp Snacks.

Universal Kids Resort includes themed lands based on the Shrek and Puss in Boots franchises.

== Internet fandom ==
An underground fandom of the Shrek film series emerged on the Internet. With the fanbase described by some as having an ironic liking towards the series, there have been several sexually explicit memes based on the titular character. The most notable example is a 2013 metameme based on a fanmade video called "Shrek is love, Shrek is life". Fans of Shrek are known as "Brogres", a take on the name "Bronies", the fans of the show My Little Pony: Friendship Is Magic outside of the shows intended audience. A "Shrek Filmmaker" movement of Source Filmmaker animators making videos based on the Internet's obsession towards the character has also occurred.

Since 2014, Madison, Wisconsin has celebrated the annual Shrekfest with costume and onion-eating contests, themed merchandise, and other festivities. In November 2018, comedy group 3GI, organizer of Shrekfest, released a shot-for-shot parody remake of the film Shrek made by a crew of over 200 artists, titled Shrek Retold.
