= Shrek (character) =

Fictional ogre character

- Shrek character
- Shrek as he is depicted in Shrek (2001)
- First appearance: Shrek! (1990 book); Shrek (2001 film)
- Created by: William Steig
- Adapted by: Ted Elliott; Terry Rossio; Joe Stillman; Roger S. H. Schulman
- Voiced by: Mike Myers (films, Shrek in the Swamp Karaoke Dance Party, Far Far Away Idol, Shrek the Halls, Scared Shrekless, Donkey's Christmas Shrektacular, The Pentaverate); Michael Gough (video games, New Shrek, Swamp Talk with Shrek and Donkey, singing voice in Far Far Away Idol, Thriller Night)

In-universe information
- Species: Ogre; Human (briefly)
- Gender: Male
- Occupation: Replacement ruler of Far Far Away (temporarily)
- Family: Unnamed father
- Spouse: Princess Fiona (wife)
- Children: Fergus, Farkle, and Felicia
- Relatives: King Harold (father-in-law); Queen Lillian (mother-in-law); Arthur Pendragon (cousin-in-law)
- Abilities: Superhuman strength; Enhanced durability; Enhanced endurance

Shrek is a fictional ogre character created by American author and cartoonist William Steig. Shrek is the protagonist of the book of the same name and a series of films by DreamWorks Animation, as well as a musical. The name "Shrek" is a romanization of the Yiddish word שרעק (shrek), or שרעקלעך (shreklekh), related to the German Schreck and meaning "fear" or "fright". In the films, Shrek was voiced by Mike Myers, and in the musical he was played principally by Brian d'Arcy James. On May 21, 2010, Shrek received a star on the Hollywood Walk of Fame in Los Angeles. In June 2010, Entertainment Weekly named him one of the "100 Greatest Characters of the Last 20 Years", placing 15th.

== Fictional biography ==
Shrek is a large, green-skinned, physically intimidating ogre with a Scottish accent. In Shrek Forever After, it is revealed that he is much smaller than the average ogre. Even though his background is something of a mystery, according to Shrek the Musical, it is revealed that on his seventh birthday, Shrek was sent away by his parents because it was an ogre tradition. The original book also has his parents evicting him from their swamp. He is seen traveling alone, being either screamed at or teased by passers-by. The only time he receives a pleasant greeting is a wave from a young Fiona, who is promptly led away by her parents. In the book, his parents threw him into a dark hole that leads to the real world.

After scaring away an angry mob, he arrives at his swamp, enters an outhouse, and breaks out as the adult Shrek. Although he is surly, dangerous, cynical, misanthropic, and venomously cranky, Shrek is peaceful and does not care to hurt anyone, and just wants to live in solitude and be left alone. Shrek is accompanied by Donkey, an excitable and hyperactive talking donkey. When Shrek is first seen, he successfully scares off villagers by roaring at them; it later becomes obvious that they were only attacking him because he is an ogre rather than because he has done anything wrong.

In Shrek, during a conversation with Donkey, he laments that he is constantly judged by the outside world the minute people meet him, and is thus better off alone ("Look, I'm not the one with the problem, okay? It's the world that seems to have a problem with me. People take one look at me and go 'Aah! Help! Run! A big stupid ugly ogre!' They judge me before they even know me. That's why I'm better off alone"). This implies that he became a recluse after trying and failing to find acceptance among others. Another factor causing lack of acceptance can be found in Shrek the Third, where it is revealed that Shrek's father tried to eat him ("I guess I should have seen it coming. He used to bathe me in barbecue sauce and put me to bed with an apple in my mouth.").

When he finds squatters where he lives, he attempts to evict them, only to learn he has no legal recourse against them, for he does not own the swamp. Shrek is hired by Lord Farquaad to rescue Princess Fiona in exchange for the deed to the swamp, with which he can legally banish the squatters. During the course of the mission, Shrek falls deeply in love with Fiona, and eventually stops her wedding with Farquaad (who is subsequently eaten by the dragon who guarded Fiona's Castle in which she was trapped) and marries her himself.

Shrek as a human in Shrek 2 (2004)

Being an ogre, Shrek has considerable physical strength, being able to break wood and metal constructions, defeat armored humans in combat, and lift or turn objects that are too heavy for a normal human being, such as a gigantic vat of magic potion against the maximum security of the Fairy Godmother in Shrek 2. In Shrek in the Swamp Karaoke Dance Party!, Shrek sings "Just the Way You Are". In Far Far Away Idol, he sang "What I Like About You" by The Romantics with Fiona. Shrek has difficulty socializing due to the fact that people think he is a mean ugly ogre, even though his appearance is more humanoid, with a few cosmetic exceptions. In the process, Shrek is said to have sociophobia.

From Shrek the Third onward, Shrek has become a well-liked celebrity, at least in Far Far Away. In the fourth movie, people manage to realize that Shrek is not dangerous, and lose their fear and prejudice against him. To Shrek's dismay, they also come to regard him as a folk hero, and visit him with even more frequency than before, disturbing him. Despite this, after the experiences of the movie, Shrek comes to appreciate his life more than ever.

== Character development for film ==
When Steven Spielberg purchased the book rights in 1991, he had planned for Bill Murray to play Shrek. Nicolas Cage was offered the role of Shrek at one point, but turned it down. In 1996, DreamWorks hired Chris Farley to do the voice. Farley had recorded 80 to 90% of the dialogue for the character, but died in December 1997, before completing the project. This would result in development of the film being scrapped, such as storyboards and recording sessions, which cost $34 million alone. Shrek screenwriter Terry Rossio describes Farley's vocal performance as being "extraordinary".

In August 2015, footage of Farley voicing the character, originally from 1997, was leaked across the Internet. According to Farley's longtime friend David Spade, he only had five days of voice work left to perform. Following Farley's death, the filmmaker approached his brother John if he would come in and finish the remaining lines, but he refused. In August 1998, DreamWorks then re-cast the role with Mike Myers, who insisted on a complete script rewrite, to leave no traces of Farley's version of Shrek. Myers stated that the reason he was interested in voicing the character was remembrances of his mother acting out fairy tales:

My mother used to take me to the library in Toronto to check out the fairy tales. And she was an actress, so she used to act out for me the different characters in all these fairy tales. And then my mother would change stuff. Like because she's from Liverpool, Babar the elephant would be from Liverpool too. So I have all these great memories and associations with those stories. And I thought, when I have kids, that's the sort of well told, silly, and fun fairy tale that I would want to take them to. But it was an amazing experience. And I think Shrek is a real classic, a fairy tale classic.

In February 2000, after Myers had completed providing the voice for the character, and after a rough cut of the film, he requested to re-record all of his lines in a Scottish accent, similar to the one his mother had used when she told him bedtime stories, and also used in previous films he was in such as So I Married an Axe Murderer (1993) and Austin Powers: The Spy Who Shagged Me (1999).

Myers explained his decision, "There is a class struggle in Shrek between the fairytale kings and queens and the common people. I always thought that Shrek was raised working class. And since Lord Farquaad (the villain) was played English, I thought of Scottish". After hearing the alternative, Katzenberg agreed to redo scenes in the film, saying, "It was so good we took $4m worth of animation out and did it again."

Myers later reported: "I got a letter from Spielberg thanking me so much for caring about the character... And he said the Scottish accent had improved the movie." Some early sketches of Shrek's house were done in 1996 and 1997 using Photoshop, with the sketches showing Shrek first living in a garbage dump near a human village called Wart Creek. At one point, he was to live with his parents and keep rotting fish in his bedroom. Art director Douglas Rogers visited a magnolia plantation in Charleston, South Carolina, for inspiration for Shrek's swamp.

== Reception and other media appearances ==
Shrek appears in the stage musical version of the 2001 film, which debuted in 2008. The role was originated by Broadway actor Brian d'Arcy James, who earned a Tony nomination for it. The character has remained virtually unchanged in the musical, as does the plot; however, various minor details differ between the musical and the film. Other actors to play the role include Ben Crawford (Broadway), Eric Petersen (National Tour), Jacob Ming-Trent (Broadway understudy), Brian Gonzales (Broadway/National Tour understudy), David Foley Jr. (National Tour understudy), Bradley Jaden (West End understudy), and from 2011 Nigel Lindsay (West End). On May 21, 2010, Shrek received a star on the Hollywood Walk of Fame in Los Angeles.

In video games, Shrek appeared as an unlockable player in Tony Hawk's Underground 2, and as a playable character in both Madagascar Kartz and DreamWorks Super Star Kartz. Myers reprised his role as Shrek for a cameo in his Netflix mini-series, The Pentaverate. A parody of Shrek appears in 2025's Borderlands 4. A swamp can be found with a green enemy named Wreck and a donkey named Burro.

=== Internet memes ===
On social media sites, Shrek is portrayed in a variety of Internet memes, and the Smash Mouth song "All Star" also became a meme as a result of the first Shrek film. Shrek's popularity is attributed to "ShrekChan", an imageboard that existed between 2012 and 2014. Fans of Shrek on the imageboard were known as "brogres", a play off of "bronies" that refers to members of the My Little Pony fandom, and memes often involved graphic material including sex, drugs, and violence for their shock value. Most infamous was the "Shrek is love, Shrek is life" meme, an animated video made through Source Filmmaker where Shrek engages in anal sex with a young boy who worships the ogre. The Atlantic writer David Sims compared this phenomenon to the Shrek franchise, saying "it's symbolic of so many things we briefly loved before quickly realizing their emptiness."
