= Goyband =

- Film poster
- Directed by: Christopher Grimm
- Written by: Christa McNamee; Dan Bar Hava; Christopher Grimm
- Produced by: Christopher J. Scott; David Schiavone; Red Sky Pictures
- Starring: Adam Pascal; Amy Davidson; Natasha Lyonne; Tovah Feldshuh; Cris Judd
- Edited by: Glen L. Scott
- Music by: Dan Bar-Hava
- Release date: December 13, 2008 (Jerusalem Jewish Film Festival)
- Running time: 99 minutes
- Country: United States
- Languages: English, Yiddish

Goyband or Falling Star is a 2008 American independent comedy film directed by Christopher Grimm, starring Adam Pascal. The film premiered at the 2008 Jerusalem Jewish Film Festival.

== Plot ==
Fading from the spotlight of his late 1990s mega-fame, boy-band icon Bobby Starr (Adam Pascal) is clinging to days gone by and begging his agent Murray to land him a decent gig. What Murray does land for Bobby is a full week headlining the grand opening of the world's first glatt kosher hotel-casino, Mazel Hotel.

As it turns out, the real force behind Bobby Starr's curious invitation to this "Orthodox otherworld" is the hotel owner's persuasive daughter Rebekka Hershenfeld (Amy Davidson), who has harbored a huge crush on Bobby since childhood. Rebekka's world is guided by her arranged betrothal to Haim (Benjamin Bauman), the son of Grand Rabbi Sheinman (Joel Leffert), who is supposed to issue the casino's all-important kosher certificate.

Rebekka's only release from the pressures of preparing to be a future rebbetzin (rabbi's wife) comes from singing along to Bobby's songs with her best friends Hani and Fani (Natasha Lyonne). They keep their practice session a secret, since their religion bars them from singing in public.

From the moment Bobby arrives at the Mazel Hotel, he goes through culture shock: his TV goes dark at sundown on Fridays, his beloved cell phone is confiscated during the Sabbath, and his Grey Goose vodka is replaced with Manischewitz. All of this is set against the backdrop of an alien world where "kosher enforcers" drag gamblers from their slot machines at prayer time; late-night treyf smugglers sneak non-kosher contraband like cheeseburgers and fried shrimp into the hotel; and where slot machines display Shofars, Menorahs and Stars of David instead of lemons, cherries and dollar signs, and chime "Hava Nagila" for lucky winners.

Arranging for Bobby Starr to play at her father's hotel might have started out as an act of rebellion for Rebekka, but when infatuation blossoms into romance, Bobby offers Rebekka a once-in-a-lifetime ticket to freedom from the constrictive life that threatens to hold her back.

== Cast ==
| Actor | Role |
|---|---|
| Adam Pascal | Bobby Starr |
| Amy Davidson | Rebekka |
| Natasha Lyonne | Fani |
| Zoe Lister-Jones | Hani |
| Tovah Feldshuh | Leah |
| Dean Edwards | Ty |
| Cris Judd | Elliot |
| Erik Liberman | Marvin |
| Joel Leffert | Grand Rabbi Sheinmann |
| Glenn Wein | Isaac |
| Larry Goldstein | Raziel |
| Benjamin Bauman | Haim Sheinmann |
| Bern Cohen | Jeremiah the Gambler |
| Wendy Diamond & Lucky | Wendy Diamond & Lucky |
| William Wise | Manny |

== Name change ==
On September 14, 2009, MarVista Entertainment announced both their distribution rights to the film Goyband and their choice to rename the movie Falling Star (note the one "r", which is different from the name of the title character).
