= Monster High (1989 film) =

- Directed by: Rudiger Poe (credited as Rudy Poe)
- Screenplay by: Roy Langsdon; John Platt
- Produced by: Eric Bernt; Tom Kuhn
- Starring: Dean Iandoli; Diana Frank; David Marriott; Robert Lind
- Cinematography: Eric Goldstein
- Edited by: Warren Chadwick
- Music by: Richard Lyons
- Distributed by: Lightyear Entertainment
- Release date: December 20, 1989
- Running time: 84 min
- Country: USA
- Language: English

Monster High is a 1989 comedy horror film directed by Rudy Poe.

== Plot ==
When aliens bring a stolen doomsday device to Earth, it is up to a group of high school students to save the world.

== Reception ==
Reviews for the film are uniformly bad. DVD Talk said "it's really tough to be entertained by anything this inane, chintzy, and uninspired." The Horror Movie Survival Guide describes the film as "Kind of like Michael Jordan's Space Jam but much much worse."

== Home media ==
Monster High was released on DVD by Sony Pictures Home Entertainment as the "4 Movie Thrills & Chills Collection, Volume 3" along with The Craft, Fright Night, and Brainscan.
