= Before and After =

Before and After may refer to:

== Art ==
- Before and After (Hogarth), a 1730 work by the artist William Hogarth

== Film ==
- Before and After (1979 film), a 1979 TV film starring Patty Duke
- Before and After (1980 film), a 1980 film starring Betty White
- Before and After (film), a 1996 drama starring Meryl Streep and Liam Neeson

== Music ==
- Before and After, 1965
  - "Before and After" (Chad & Jeremy song), the title song
- "Before and After" (Rush song), 1974
- Before & After (Tim Finn album), 1993 album
- Before & After (The Wannadies album), 2002 album
- Before and After (Neil Young album), 2023 album
- Before and After, a 2004 album by Alec Su
- Before & After (Magnate y Valentino album), 2006 album

== Publications ==
- Before and After (novel), a 1992 novel by Rosellen Brown; basis for the 1996 film
- Before and After, a 1997 travel essay by Pat Murphy

== Television ==
- "Before and After", a 1987 episode of The Golden Girls
- "Before and After" (Star Trek: Voyager), a 1997 episode of Star Trek: Voyager
- "Before and After", a 2009 episode of Grey's Anatomy
- "Before and After", a clue category combining two questions made popular by Wheel of Fortune and Jeopardy
