= Dean Edwards =

American comedian, actor and musician (born 1970)

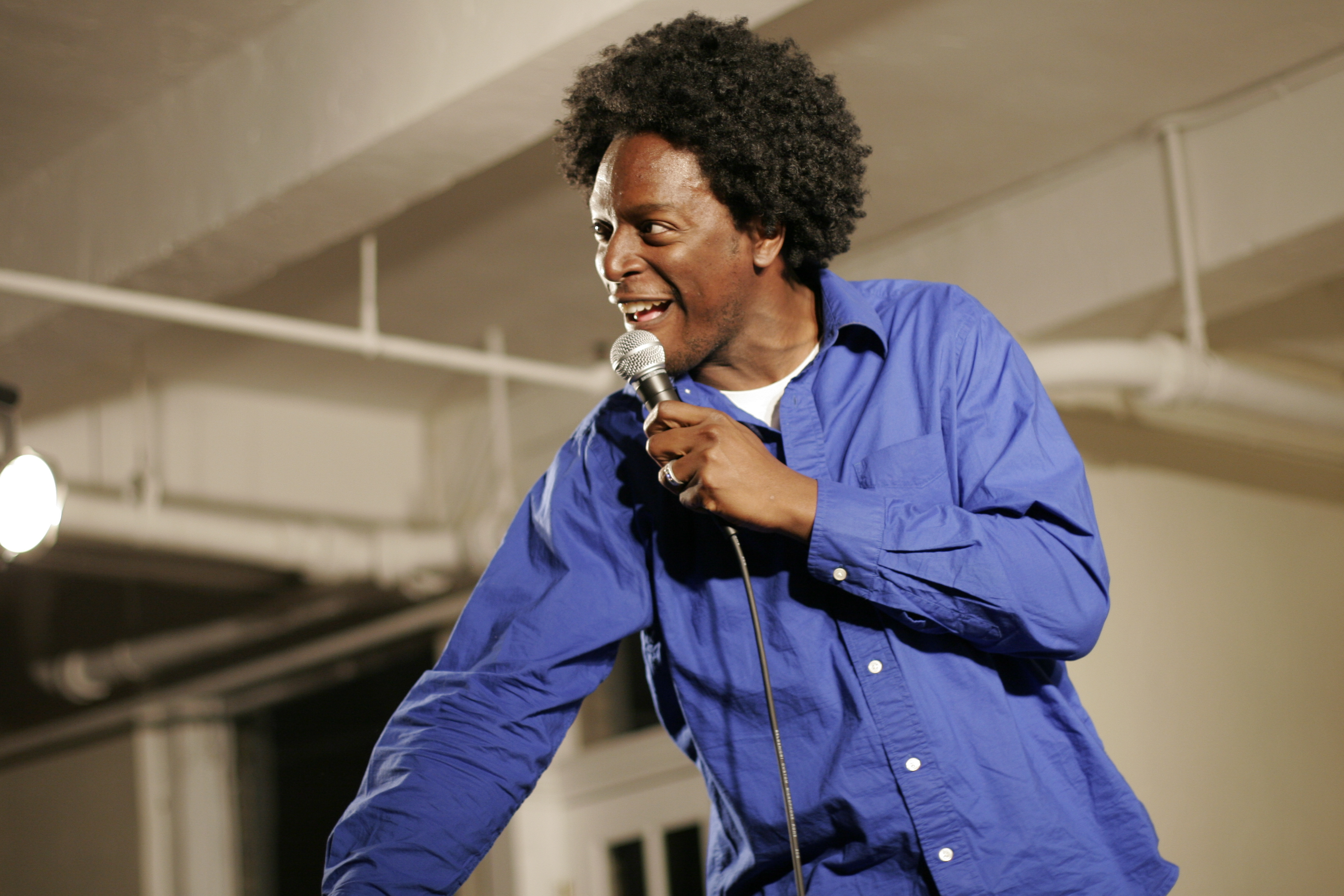
- Edwards in 2007
- Born: July 30, 1970 (age 56); New York City, U.S.
- Notable work: Saturday Night Live; Donkey on Scared Shrekless
- Spouse: Tracy Walters
- Children: 3

Comedy career
- Years active: 1990–present
- Medium: Stand-up, film, television
- Genres: Comedy, sketch comedy
- Website: deanedwards.net

Dean Edwards (born July 30, 1970) is an American stand-up comedian, actor, writer, and singer. His work as a voice actor includes Scottie Pippen and Spike Lee in Celebrity Deathmatch, a robot in Robotomy and Donkey in Scared Shrekless after Eddie Murphy was unable to reprise the role (Edwards had impersonated Murphy on stage), along with a couple of other projects. He also appeared in Saturday Night Live Weekend Update Halftime Special as Savion Glover and Don Cheadle, in Tony n' Tina's Wedding as Father Mark, and The Sopranos.

Edwards has a YouTube channel, "deanedwardscomedy". He was also the host of the critically acclaimed TV show "Vidiots" on TVone.

== Career ==
Dean Edwards developed a reputation for working clean and taught classes in stand-up comedy technique. Edwards is also a voice artist, having done voice work for Celebrity Deathmatch and Robotomy. He also did voice work for the audiobook version of Max Brooks' World War Z: An Oral History of the Zombie War.

In the 2010 Halloween special Scared Shrekless, he provided the voice of Donkey after Eddie Murphy could not return. Murphy returned to play Donkey in the 2010 Christmas special Donkey's Christmas Shrektacular. Edwards was hired as a staff writer for Daily Comedy, a website where professional and amateur stand-up comedians would post new jokes frequently. Edwards has also appeared in commercials for Snickers and Ford.

=== Saturday Night Live ===
Edwards joined the cast of Saturday Night Live in 2001. He developed several impressions, including Michael Jackson, Wayne Brady, Chris Tucker, Don Cheadle, Colin Powell, Serena Williams, Nipsey Russell, Grace Jones, Randy Jackson, Redman, Denzel Washington and Billy Ocean. Despite his penchant for impressions, Edwards didn't get much screen time in his brief tenure on the show. He left after the show's 28th season (2003), citing creative differences.

In Saturday Night Live Weekend Update Halftime Special, he did his impressions of Savion Glover and Don Cheadle.

== Filmography ==
=== Film ===
Year	Title	Role	Notes
2003	Marci X	Audience Member	
2004	Tony n' Tina's Wedding	Father Mark	
2006	A New Wave	Rupert	
2007	Universal Remote	Serious Black Man	
2007	Spider-Man 3	Newsstand Patron	
2008	Goyband	Ty	
2010	April's Fools	Now Later	
2011	Swap	Bartender	Short film
2011	Thriller Night	Donkey	Voice; short film
2014	Top Five	Himself	
2020	Write It Black	Morris "Punchline" Blackmon	
2024	Con Job	Tim	

=== Television ===
Year	Title	Role	Notes
1996	Melrose Place	Process Server	Episode: "Sole Sister"
1998	Celebrity Deathmatch	Scottie Pippen / Spike Lee	Voice; 2 episodes
2001–2003	Saturday Night Live	Various	Main cast; 40 episode
2003	Saturday Night Live Weekend Update Halftime Special	Savion Glover / Don Cheadle	TV special
2004	The Sopranos	Charles	Episode: "Where's Johnny?"
2005	Weekends at the D.L.	Sweetmouth	Episode: "1.24"
2006	Where My Dogs At?	Various Celebrities	Voice; 8 episodes
2010	Scared Shrekless	Donkey	Voice; TV special
2010	Robotomy	Robot	Voice; episode: "Mean Green"
2014	Deadbeat	Gucci Man	Episode: "The Knockoff"
2019–2020	Our Cartoon President	Cory Booker / Various	Voice; 8 episodes
2021	Let's Be Real	O. J. Simpson / Stephen A. Smith	Voice; 3 episodes
2025	Saturday Night Live 50th Anniversary Special	Himself	TV special

=== Video games ===
Year	Title	Role	Notes
2023	DreamWorks All-Star Kart Racing	Donkey	

=== As himself ===
Himself
Year	Title	Role	Notes
2003	Heroes of Comedy: Women on Top	Himself	
2007	Comedy Colosseum	Himself - Host	
2007	P. Diddy Presents the Bad Boys of Comedy	Himself - Comedian	Also writer
2007	The Late Late Show with Craig Ferguson	Himself / Himself - Guest	
2008	Clean Mic: Laughing Until It Hurts	Himself	
2008	The Movie Preview Awards	Himself - Presenter	
2008	Last Call with Carson Daly	Himself	
2008	Comics Without Borders	Himself	
2008	Comics Unleashed	Himself - Comedian	
2009	Souled Out Comedy	Himself	
2009	Black to the Future	Himself	
2020	Funny You Should Ask	Himself - Panelist	
