= Gramogram =

Group of letters pronounced as if a word

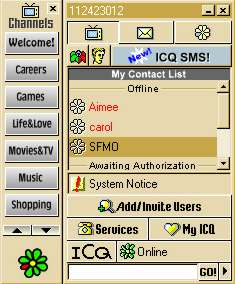
Instant-messaging app ICQ is a gramogram for "I seek you".

A gramogram, grammagram, or letteral word is a letter or group of letters which can be pronounced to form one or more words, as in "CU" for "see you". They are a subset of rebuses, and are commonly used as abbreviations.

They are sometimes used as a component of cryptic crossword clues.

== In arts and culture ==
A poem reportedly appeared in the Woman's Home Companion of July 1903 using many gramograms: it was preceded by the line "ICQ out so that I can CU have fun translating the sound FX of this poem".

The Marcel Duchamp "readymade" L.H.O.O.Q. is an example of a gramogram. Those letters, pronounced in French, sound like "Elle a chaud au cul", an idiom which translates to "she has a hot ass", or in Duchamp's words "there is fire down below".

The William Steig books CDB! (1968) and CDC? (1984) use letters in the place of words. Steig has been credited as being a founder of this literary technique.

The suicide prevention charity R U OK?'s name is a gramogram, with supporters encouraged to text "R U OK?" to friends and family to check on their mental health.

A short gramogram dialogue opening with a customer asking "FUNEX" ("Have you any eggs?") appears in a 1949 book Hail fellow well met by Seymour Hicks and was expanded into a longer sketch of phrasebook-style gramogram dialogue for the comedy sketch show The Two Ronnies, under the title Swedish made simple.

James Taylor's 1979 album Flag contains the song, "B.S.U.R. (S.U.C.S.I.M.I.M.)", whose refrain is this gramogram. In a 1981 Rolling Stone interview, Taylor said the idea was inspired by Steig's book.

The 1980s Canadian gameshow Bumper Stumpers required contestants to decode gramograms presented as fictional vanity licence plates.

Here Come the ABCs, a 2005 children's album by They Might Be Giants, contains the song "I C U", which is entirely made up of gramograms.

In the Ben 10 franchise, two transformations used by protagonist Ben Tennyson are named gramograms: XLR8, introduced in the original series, and NRG, introduced in Ben 10: Ultimate Alien.

== See also ==
- Logogram – Grapheme which represents a word or a morpheme
- Rebus – Allusional device that uses pictures to represent words or parts of words
- SMS language – Abbreviated slang used in text messaging
