= Fairy Godmother (Shrek) =

Shrek character

- Shrek character
- First appearance: Shrek 2 (2004)
- Last appearance: Thriller Night (2011)
- Created by: Andrew Adamson
- Voiced by: Jennifer Saunders (film); Claudia Ann Christian (video games); Pinky Turzo (Thriller Night)

In-universe information
- Species: Fairy
- Gender: Female
- Occupation: Fairy godmother Businesswoman
- Family: Prince Charming (son)

The Fairy Godmother is the main antagonist of Shrek 2, voiced by actress Jennifer Saunders. In the film, the Fairy Godmother is the mother of Prince Charming, who Princess Fiona was originally intended to wed prior to meeting Shrek. Believing that ogres should not live happily ever after, she plots against newlyweds Shrek and Fiona's relationship, using her magic and potions in an attempt to trick Fiona into falling in love with her son. Fairy Godmother is loosely based on the stock fairy godmother character in fairy tales, specifically "Cinderella" and "Sleeping Beauty", serving as a parody of the common trope.

The Shrek franchise is based on William Steig's children's book Shrek!, which mentions a witch who predicts that Shrek will meet a donkey and marry a princess uglier than himself. Early drafts of the first film included a character named Dama Fortuna, a witch from whom Fiona receives the potion that modifies her enchantment, forcing her to alternate between her human and ogre forms on a nightly basis. Originally intended to reveal Fiona's backstory via prologue, the scene was discarded because it was deemed too depressing by test audiences. Wanting to incorporate some more fairy tale elements into the sequel, writer Ted Elliot reimagined the witch as Fiona's bigoted fairy godmother. Saunders recorded her role in four days and also provided her character's singing voice.

The Fairy Godmother has received mostly positive reviews from film critics, who appreciated her humor and villainy, as well as Saunders' performance, which some critics compared to her Absolutely Fabulous character Edina Monsoon. Saunders' performance earned her a People's Choice Award for Favorite Movie Villain.

== Development ==
=== Creation ===
Although loosely based on William Steig's children's book Shrek! (1990), the Shrek franchise differs greatly from its source material, particularly pertaining to its main characters. In Steig's story, a witch foretells that Shrek will marry a princess she describes as uglier in appearance than Shrek himself, prompting the ogre to pursue her. The witch also predicts that Shrek will meet a donkey, who will play a prominent role throughout his journey. Early storyboards for Shrek (2001) featured a witch named Dama Fortuna, a character originally intended to have been voiced by actress Linda Hunt. The character was written for a sequence entitled "Fiona’s Prologue", which was intended to depict Princess Fiona's backstory and disclose how she came to be imprisoned in the first place. Having originally been born an ogre to human parents who lock her away, Fiona escapes her tower and seeks assistance from the elderly "gipsy-like" fortune teller Dama Fortuna. In addition to teaching the princess about her past, the witch is responsible for giving Fiona a potion that alters her curse, initially offering her a choice between two potions, one of which promises to turn Fiona beautiful once consumed, while the other guarantees Fiona's happy ever after. After Fiona drinks the "Beauty" to find that she is still an ogre, Dama Fortuna explains that the potion allows her to become human during the daytime, only to revert to her ogre form each sunset until the spell is broken by true love's kiss.

The prologue was ultimately discarded because test audiences deemed it too depressing, prompting Hunt's departure. While discussing potential ideas for a sequel, DreamWorks recalled that they had enjoyed incorporating traditional fairy tale concepts into the franchise, specifically a fairy godmother "who eventually turned out to be a bit of a trickster". In May 2001, Ted Elliott, screenwriter of the first Shrek film, confirmed that a bigoted version of the Dama Fortuna character would be written into the sequel. Thus, the idea of Dama Fortuna was resurrected, and Fiona's fairy godmother was conceived as a magical entity whose use of magic and potions do not always benefit Shrek and Fiona. Thus, the character is considered to be a parody of traditional fairy godmother characters.

When developing Shrek Forever After (2010), the filmmakers wanted Rumpelstiltskin, the film's villain, to be as different as possible from previous Shrek villains. Compared to Fairy Godmother, Rumpelstiltskin was envisioned as a "ratty, childish, scummy man" to contrast with Fairy Godmother's eloquence as a businesswoman.

=== Voice and characterization ===
Fairy Godmother is voiced by English comedian and actress Jennifer Saunders. Saunders was chosen for the role because Steven Spielberg somehow got hold in 2002 of her unsuccessful audition tape for Ursula in The Little Mermaid (1989), leading Spielberg to insist directors Andrew Adamson, Kelly Asbury and Conrad Vernon to cast Saunders in the scheming role. The character was designed with Saunders in mind. Saunders recorded her entire role in only four days over the course of one year. The actress found working on an animated film to be liberating and found the experience to have several advantages as an actor, describing voice acting as a "perfect" career "because you get all these perks ... but you don't have to do any of that other, you know, filming ... no one's going to say, 'That movie didn't work because Jennifer Saunders' voice wasn't good'". Saunders concluded that performing in Shrek 2 (2004) "has been one of my favourite jobs in the world", additionally appreciating that critics and viewers were not able to judge her physical appearance. Saunders recorded her dialogue solely opposite Adamson, who temporarily fulfilled all other characters' roles during Saunders' sessions. Saunders elaborated, "You feel that you've just done some stuff, and they then go away and pull it all apart and make this fantastic thing. Everyone in the cast has the same experience of the film ... It's like you haven't really been in it". Decca Aitkenhead of The Guardian believes Saunders "must have been the obvious choice for the producers of Shrek 2, for this ambiguous sensibility is the very essence of the film - a Hollywood send-up of Hollywood". At Saunders' request, the filmmakers allowed her to record a line of her character promising to return despite her death scene, as Saunders insisted that they would surely want to bring back Fairy Godmother in further installments, but the decision to kill off the character remained.

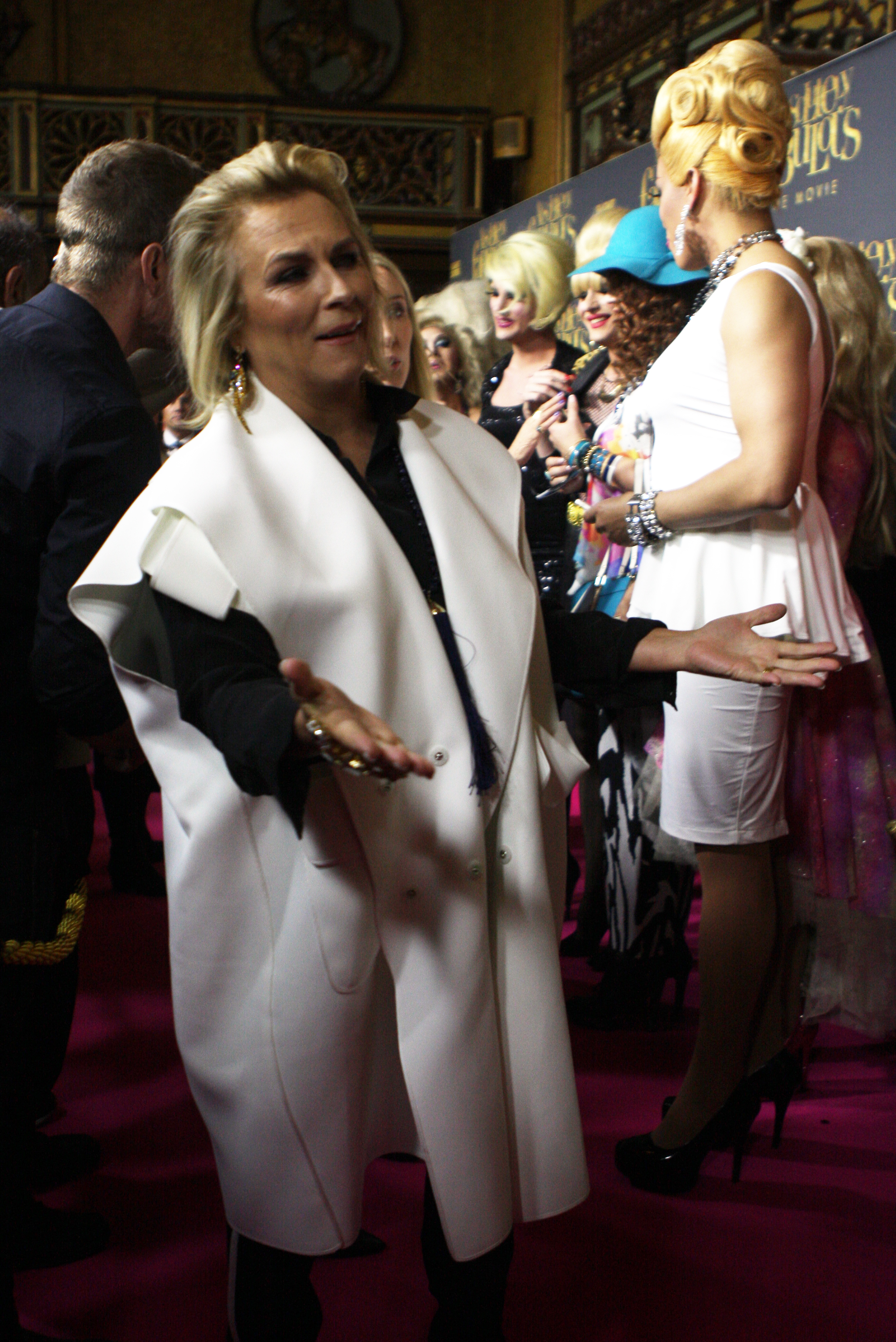
Fairy Godmother is voiced by comedian and actress Jennifer Saunders, who recorded her role in four days.

Saunders provided all of her character's singing, recording two songs for the film. Saunders sang the "Fairy Godmother Song", a scene that parodies Disney's animated film Beauty and the Beast (1991) by featuring dancing furniture. Saunders also recorded a cover of Bonnie Tyler's "Holding Out for a Hero" (1984) for the film's soundtrack, which her character performs towards the end of film. During the sequence, Fairy Godmother sings while lying atop a grand piano, referencing Michelle Pfeiffer's sultry rendition of "Makin' Whoopee" in the film The Fabulous Baker Boys (1989). As Saunders had recorded most of her part in isolation, it was not until the film's premiere at Cannes Film Festival that she met her castmates, including Antonio Banderas and Julie Andrews, who voiced Puss in Boots and Queen Lillian, respectively. The Dallas Observer journalist Robert Wilonsky found it interesting that Saunders, as opposed to Andrews, received two songs in the film. In terms of animation, Shrek 2 featured more human characters and complex costumes than its predecessor, among them the Fairy Godmother, who wears a floor-length one-piece gown. The final design was assembled using a combination of "an upper portion deformed by the character technical drawing and a lower section simulated by the clothing department".

Christopher Fiduccia of Screen Rant believed Saunders closely resembled her character, describing their facial features as "pretty much identical". Saunders described her character as "an attractive blonde with blue eyes, a tan and a nice smile". Writing for Variety, Todd McCarthy wrote that the character's appearance consists of "stylishly swept-back gray hair, glasses perched skeptically down her nose and constantly whirring wings keeping her airborne like a hummingbird". Michael O'Sullivan, writing for The Washington Post, described Fairy Godmother as "as far from the benign, Disney-fied wand-waver as possible". Comparing the character to Sleeping Beauty (1959)'s Maleficent, Beliefnet described Fairy Godmother as villainous despite her "sweet and motherly" outward appearance. Likening her to a stage mother by "looking to advance her own child’s status, and thereby her own, through cut-throat methods", the author observed that the character "fulfills wishes as a business, with little heed to consequences. She has her own ulterior motives and isn't afraid to manipulate, threaten, or blackmail to reach her objectives". The author concluded that the character can be used as "an example of the negative effects of forcing our own goals onto someone who trusts us. If we manipulate them for our own ends, we violate that sacred trust, and rob them of their ability to follow their own best path".

Josh Larsen of the Chicago Suburbs News wrote that the character behaves "like a magically powered plastic surgeon". The character's bubble motif references Glinda the Good Witch from The Wizard of Oz (1939). James Kendrick of Qnetwork.com deemed the character "a perfectly distilled satirical jab at corporate ruthlessness".

== Appearances ==
Fairy Godmother first appears in Shrek 2 as the mother of Prince Charming, who had originally planned to rescue Fiona and become heir to the kingdom of Far, Far Away. Newly married Shrek and Fiona visit Far, Far Away to meet Fiona's parents for the first time, who are surprised to learn that Fiona has both married an ogre and remained one herself. When Fairy Godmother discovers that Fiona has married Shrek instead of Charming as originally intended, the character plots to manipulate Fiona into marrying her son, conspiring with Fiona's father King Harold to uphold a deal they had once made and kill Shrek in the process. Fairy Godmother also manages a potion factory, from which Shrek steals a potion in hope of becoming handsome to win his father in-law's approval. After Shrek consumes the potion that turns both him and Fiona into attractive versions of themselves, Fairy Godmother tries to trick Fiona into believing that Charming is Shrek but she resists his new personality. Partnering with Charming and King Harold, Fairy Godmother instructs Harold to give Fiona a potion that, once consumed, will force her to fall in love with the first person she kisses, intending for it to be Charming. At Shrek and Fiona's wedding ball, Harold reveals that he intentionally did not give Fiona the potion. Angered, Fairy Godmother punishes Shrek and aims a blast from her wand at him, which is deflected by Harold who ultimately turns into a frog in the process (which is revealed to be his original form) and turns the Fairy Godmother into bubbles, disintegrating her. Fiona chooses not to kiss Shrek in favor of the pair returning to their ogre forms so that she can remain married to the ogre she fell in love with.

In Shrek the Third (2007), the Fairy Godmother was seen in a picture on Prince Charming's vanity that said "mommy's little angel". In Shrek Forever After, the Fairy Godmother was not seen but she was mentioned in a flashback when King Harold told Queen Lillian that Fairy Godmother said that true love's kiss can break Fiona's curse. Lillian told him she does not trust Fairy Godmother and thought that Rumplestiltskin could end Fiona's curse. The character also appears in the video game adaptations Shrek 2 (2004) and Shrek Forever After: The Video Game (2010).

== Reception ==
=== Critical response ===
Teen Ink hailed Fairy Godmother as "the perfect villain", while Angie Errigo of Empire described her as a fun character. ReelViews' James Berardinelli described Saunders' performance as "perfectly nasty". Hugh Hart of the San Francisco Chronicle believed Saunders had won most of the film's "big laughs", while JoBlo.com's Berge Garabedian described her as a "nice rendition" of the classic character. Dan DeMaggio of Metro Times wrote that the character was "forever stealing the show", describing her as "a cross between a Mary Kay cosmetics saleswoman and Angela Lansbury in The Manchurian Candidate". Joe Morgenstern, film critic for The Wall Street Journal, cited Fairy Godmother as an example of the film "match[ing] vivid vocal performances with engaging new characters". Sympatico's Angela Baldassarre cited Fairy Godmother as an appealing character who "provide[s] the fodder needed to make this the must-see comedy of the season." Jon Niccum, writing for the Lawrence Journal-World, reviewed that Fairy Godmother especially "adds flavor" to the film. Writing for Slate, film critic David Edelstein deemed Fairy Godmother a "remarkable creation, like the sugary/steely face of the modern Disney", while the Deseret News' Jeff Vice observed that the character constantly steals the scene from Shrek and Fiona. The Spinoff's Josie Adams considered Fairy Godmother "the only part of [the film] worth pissing yourself for." Writing for Game Rant, Victoria Rose Caister called the character a smart, fun villain who is "evil but also entertaining to watch and kind of likable."

The Washington Post's Michael O'Sullivan wrote that Saunders "brings a deliciously nasty edge to her role". Scott Chitwood of ComingSoon.net wrote that the actress "delivers a fine performance", concluding, "If you liked her in Absolutely Fabulous, you’ll enjoy her in Shrek 2." Pete Vonder Haar of Film Threat observed that Saunders "seems to enjoy giving voice to the Fairy Godmother", preferring her over Charming. Kevin Lally of Film Journal International wrote that Saunders steals "the rest of the show ... bringing her Absolutely Fabulous haughtiness and wicked wit to the role", while Rick Groen of The Globe and Mail reviewed Fairy Godmother as some of Saunders' best work, hailing her character's entrance as "a gorgeous piece of animation". Also comparing Fairy Godmother to Saunders' Absolutely Fabulous character Edina Monsoon, The Guardian journalist Decca Aitkenhead described her as "an ambitious fag hag who bullies the royals as if they were her family in Ab Fab", believing that her performance, humor and delivery can only be rivaled by Eddie Murphy's Donkey. Variety film critic Todd McCarthy wrote that Saunders did "her best to elevate" the film via a performance he described as "worthy of the most cunning storybook characters." McCarthy also identified the addition of musical numbers to Saunders' performance as a bonus. Logan Raschke of The Daily Eastern News concluded the character "wouldn't be who she is if it wasn't for Jennifer Saunders (and fantastic writing)", describing the actress's portrayal as "stern, controlled and yet gentle when need be." The A.V. Club's Tom Breihan said Saunders "has audible fun" in the role.

Christian website Crosswalk.com deemed some of Fairy Godmother's behaviour "objectionable" and "unnecessary", particularly the scene in which she "writhes on a piano, singing a sexy song." Despite believing that Andrews could have voiced the character well, Bill Beyrer of CinemaBlend felt that Saunders "did a bang up job", but found the character's appearance to be too realistic at times. In a more negative review, the San Francisco Chronicle film critic Mick LaSalle found the character too distracting from Shrek and Fiona's storyline, continuing, "The filmmakers invest too much time and faith in the idea of the fairy godmother as being wickedly amusing, but she's no Cruella De Vil, and the movie suffers." However, LaSalle enjoyed Fairy Godmother's performance of "Holding Out for a Hero" nonetheless. Michael Sragow, film critic for The Baltimore Sun, wrote that "Not even ... Saunders can add zing to the script's rough sketch of a sorceress", dismissing her as "a female impersonator caught in a female body, promoting specialties that are the fairy-tale equivalents of super-extreme makeovers." The Seattle Post-Intelligencer's Paula Nechak felt that Fairy Godmother grew "tedious", believing that she "exist[s] solely to drive the plot." While reviewing Shrek Forever After (2010), Beth Patch of the Christian Broadcasting Network expressed gratitude that Fairy Godmother was "no longer part of the cast", having been replaced by Rumpelstiltskin as the film's villain.

=== Recognition ===
Screen Rant ranked Fairy Godmother the third best DreamWorks villain, with author Matthew Wilkson attributing her high placement to her deceptively kind nature. The author crowned her "one of the most memorable villains in the history of Dreamworks". Saunders won Favorite Movie Villain at the 31st People's Choice Awards, one of five awards Shrek 2 won at the ceremony. Allison J. Scharmann, contributing to the Harvard Crimson, believed the "franchise would not be complete without the sequel’s introduction of Fairy Godmother". The Daily Edge ranked Fairy Godmother the seventh reason "we need to appreciate Shrek more than we already do", with author Rachel O'Neill describing the character as "a STUNNING villain" who is "constantly fixing all the problems the men in her life cause her". Bailey Rymes of Her Campus called Fairy Godmother the main reason she considers Shrek 2 the second best film in the series, describing her as an icon.

Her Campus ranked Fairy Godmother the second "Top 10 Female Villains in Animation", with contributor Lilivette Domínguez writing, "instead of hating to love her, you love to hate her because she is a likable villain ... you can’t really hate her because she was smarter than everyone else". Entertainment Weekly recognized Fairy Godmother as one of "13 who have us under their spell". At the 90th Academy Awards in 2018, several fans compared actress Meryl Streep's red gown, up-do hairstyle and glasses to Fairy Godtmother's on social media. Fans also suggested that the actress play the character in a live-action adaptation of the film.
