= CDB! =

1968 children's book by William Steig

- Book cover
- Author: William Steig
- Illustrator: William Steig
- Cover artist: William Steig
- Language: English
- Genre: Children's book
- Publisher: Simon & Schuster
- Publication date: 1968
- Publication place: United States
- Media type: Print
- ISBN: 0671650238
- Followed by: CDC?

CDB! is a children's picture book written and illustrated by William Steig, who later won the Caldecott Medal in 1970 for Sylvester and the Magic Pebble. The book, published in 1968 by Simon & Schuster, is a collection of pictures with captions written in code, with letters in the caption standing for words the letter's names sound like (gramograms). The illustrations that accompany the codes show scenes that help the reader decode the caption. The cover illustration shows a child pointing out a bee to another child. The title, CDB!, thus translates as "See (CEE) the (DEE) bee (BEE)!" The book was updated by Steig over thirty years after its original publication with the addition of color to the illustrations, as well as an answer key at the end. Steig followed this book with a sequel, CDC?

== Reception ==
Richard F. Abrahamson, writing in The Reading Teacher, commented: "For the child who is playing with language and sounds, this book is hilarious". Lilian H. Heil, in Children's Book and Media Review, called CDB! "entertaining" for adults and children. Steven Heller cites CDB! as having predicted the rise of SMS language (textspeak), writing: "For over forty years this book has both perplexed and excited its young and old readers, offering challenges and frustrations with a satisfying punchline. In the original Windmill paperback edition, a summary of the book reads as follows: 'Letters and words are used to create the sounds of words and simple sentences 4 u 2 figure out with the aid of illustrations'. This is a fairly accurate description of SMS-speak".

== Legacy ==
Other artists have specifically taken Steig's CDB! as the inspiration for their books of cartoons captioned with gramograms, including Joana Avillez and Molly Young, whose D C-T! features cartoons about New York ("D C-T" translates as "the city"); and Amy Sohn, whose CBD! features cartoons about cannabidiol. Amy Krouse Rosenthal and Tom Lichtenheld's Wumbers was dedicated to Steig and cited CDB! as its inspiration; Wumbers combined regular words with numbers to substitute for their sounds, such as "Would you like some honey 2 swee10 your tea?"

The book's title inspired the name of a chain of pizzerias in the Tampa area, CDB Pizza, which operated from 1975 to 2019. The pizzeria kept copies of the book on tables for customers to read. Many copies were taken, resulting in the restaurateurs buying 15,000 copies of the book over the years.
