= Shrek the Third =

2007 DreamWorks Animation film

- Theatrical release poster
- Directed by: Chris Miller
- Screenplay by: Jeffrey Price Peter S. Seaman; Chris Miller; Aron Warner
- Story by: Andrew Adamson
- Based on: Shrek! by William Steig
- Produced by: Aron Warner
- Starring: Mike Myers; Eddie Murphy; Cameron Diaz; Antonio Banderas; Julie Andrews; John Cleese; Rupert Everett; Eric Idle; Justin Timberlake
- Edited by: Michael Andrews
- Music by: Harry Gregson-Williams
- Production companies: DreamWorks Animation; PDI/DreamWorks
- Distributed by: Paramount Pictures (Note: In July 2014, the film's distribution rights were purchased by DreamWorks Animation from Paramount Pictures and transferred to 20th Century Fox before reverting to Universal Pictures in 2018 following NBCUniversal's acquisition of DreamWorks Animation in 2016.)
- Release dates: May 6, 2007 (Mann Village Theatre); May 18, 2007 (United States)
- Running time: 93 minutes
- Country: United States
- Language: English
- Budget: $160 million
- Box office: $808.3 million

Shrek the Third (Note: Also known as Shrek 3) is a 2007 American animated fantasy comedy film loosely based on the 1990 children's picture book Shrek! by William Steig and produced by DreamWorks Animation. Directed by Chris Miller and written by Jeffrey Price, Peter S. Seaman, Miller, and producer Aron Warner, it is the sequel to Shrek 2 (2004) and the third installment in the Shrek film series. The film features Mike Myers, Eddie Murphy, Cameron Diaz, Antonio Banderas, Rupert Everett, Julie Andrews, and John Cleese reprising their voice roles from the previous films, along with new additions Justin Timberlake as Arthur Pendragon and Eric Idle as Merlin. In the film, Prince Charming is plotting to overthrow Shrek and Fiona, who have inherited the throne following King Harold's death. Shrek has no interest in ruling the kingdom and attempts to convince Fiona's underachieving 16-year-old cousin Artie to reign instead.

Shrek the Third premiered at the Mann Village Theatre, Westwood in Los Angeles on May 6, 2007, and was theatrically released in the United States by Paramount Pictures on May 18, 2007. Despite mixed reviews, the film was a commercial success, grossing $808.3 million worldwide on a budget of $160 million, becoming the fourth-highest-grossing film of 2007. It was nominated for Best Animated Film at the 61st British Academy Film Awards. A sequel, Shrek Forever After, was released on May 21, 2010.

== Plot ==
Shrek and Princess Fiona are to succeed King Harold, but Shrek's attempts to serve as the regent during Harold's medical absence end in disaster, as he lacks interest in being king of Far Far Away. With his dying breath, Harold tells Shrek of another heir: his nephew and Fiona's cousin, Arthur "Artie" Pendragon. Meanwhile, Prince Charming vows to avenge the death of his mother, the Fairy Godmother (Note: As depicted in Shrek 2 (2004)), and become king. He goes to the Poison Apple tavern and persuades the fairy tale villains to fight for their "happily ever after", and help him take over Far Far Away.

Shrek sets out to retrieve Artie with help from Donkey and Puss in Boots. As they sail away, Fiona reveals to Shrek that she is pregnant. Shrek is horrified because he believes he is incapable of raising children. The trio journey to Worcestershire Academy, an elite magical boarding school, where they discover that Artie is a scrawny 16-year-old outcast.

At the school pep rally, Shrek tells Artie he has been chosen to be king of Far Far Away. He is excited until Donkey and Puss inadvertently frighten him while discussing the king's responsibilities. Losing confidence, Artie tries to take control of the ship and steer it back to Worcestershire. Following a scuffle with Shrek, the ship crashes on a remote island. They encounter Artie's retired magic teacher, Merlin, who convinces Shrek and Artie to open up to each other.

As Fiona and Queen Lillian host a baby shower with a group of princesses, Charming and the villains attack the castle. Gingy, Pinocchio, the Big Bad Wolf, and the Three Little Pigs stall Charming's group long enough for the ladies to escape. When one of the pigs accidentally reveals that Shrek has gone to retrieve Artie, Charming sends Captain Hook and his pirates to capture them. Rapunzel, having fallen in love with Charming, betrays Fiona, and the ladies are locked in the castle dungeons.

Captain Hook and his pirates find Shrek on Merlin's island, where Shrek avoids capture, and Hook reveals Charming's takeover of Far Far Away. After the battle, Artie tricks Merlin into using his magic to send them to Far Far Away. Although the spell works, it accidentally causes Puss and Donkey to switch bodies. They find Pinocchio and learn that Charming plans to kill Shrek as part of a play, but they are caught and taken captive after breaking into the castle.

Charming prepares to kill Artie to retain the crown, but Shrek saves his life by lying about how he was just using Artie to replace him as the next king. Charming allows a disheartened Artie to leave. Donkey and Puss are imprisoned with Fiona, Lillian and the other princesses, where Fiona grows frustrated with their lack of initiative, but Lillian frees them all by headbutting an opening in the stone wall of the prison. While the princesses launch a rescue mission for Shrek, Donkey and Puss free Gingy, Pinocchio, and the others along with Dragon and Donkey's children, and then convince a departing Artie that Shrek lied to prevent Charming from killing him.

Charming stages a showdown in a musical theater in front of the kingdom. Just as he is about to kill Shrek, Fiona, Puss, Donkey, the princesses and other fairy tale characters confront the villains, but are quickly subdued. Artie shows up and gives a speech to the villains, convincing them that they can be accepted into society instead of being outcasts. The villains agree to give up their evil ways, but Charming refuses to listen and lunges at Artie with his sword. Shrek blocks the blow, and it appears that he has been stabbed. However, as Charming decrees himself the new king, Shrek reveals that Charming misaimed his sword and pushes him aside, while Dragon knocks the stage tower onto Charming.

With Charming defeated, Artie is crowned the new king of Far Far Away. While the kingdom celebrates, Merlin appears and reverts Puss and Donkey's body swap, but mistakenly keeps their tails switched. Later, back at the swamp, Shrek and Fiona begin raising their new triplets with help from Donkey, Puss, Lillian, and Dragon, with Shrek overcoming his fear of parenthood.

== Voice cast ==
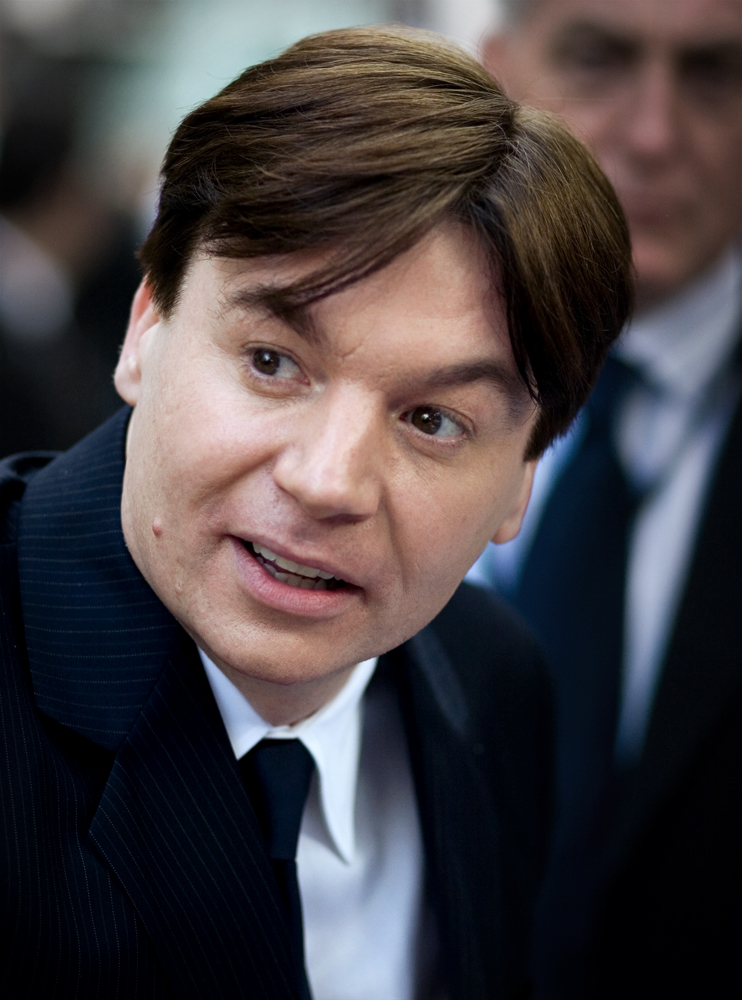
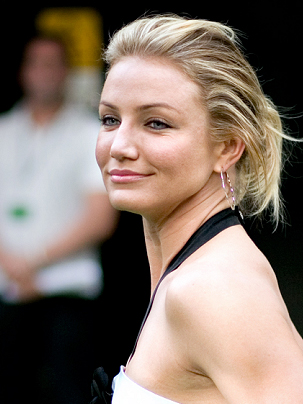
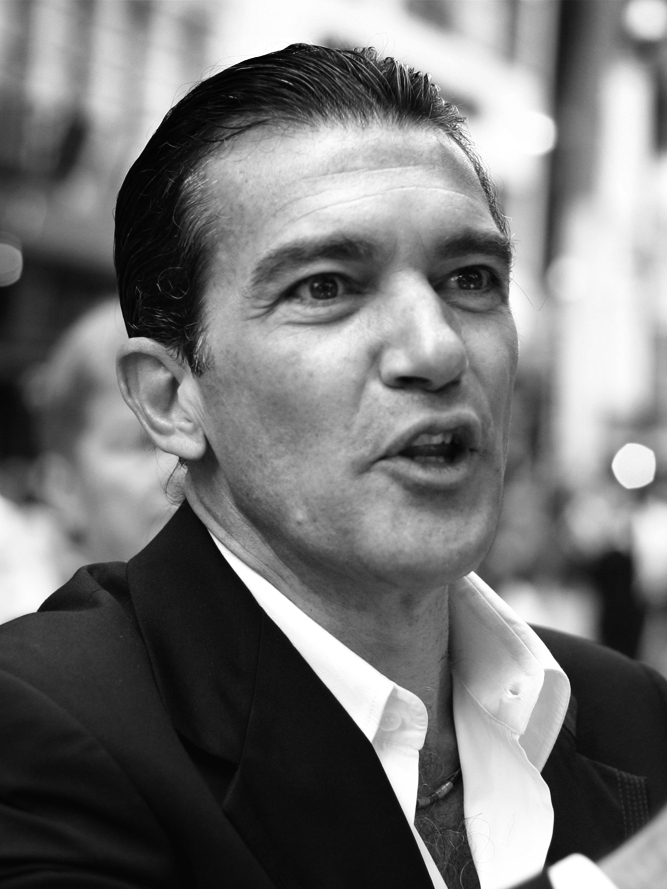
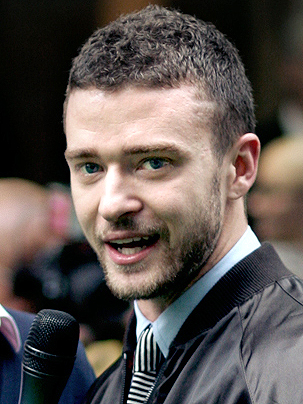
Mike Myers, Cameron Diaz, Antonio Banderas and Justin Timberlake at the film's British premiere in London.
- Mike Myers as Shrek
- Eddie Murphy as Donkey
- Cameron Diaz as Princess Fiona
- Antonio Banderas as Puss in Boots
- Julie Andrews as Queen Lillian
- John Cleese as King Harold
- Rupert Everett as Prince Charming
- Eric Idle as Merlin
- Justin Timberlake as Arthur "Artie" Pendragon
- Susanne Blakeslee as Evil Queen
- Cody Cameron as Pinocchio, the Three Pigs, Fergus
- Larry King as Doris the Ugly Stepsister
- Christopher Knights as The Three Blind Mice
- John Krasinski as Lancelot
- Ian McShane as Captain Hook
- Cheri Oteri as Sleeping Beauty
- Regis Philbin as Mabel the Ugly Stepsister
- Amy Poehler as Snow White
- Seth Rogen as Ship Captain
- Maya Rudolph as Rapunzel
- Amy Sedaris as Cinderella
- Conrad Vernon as Gingerbread Man, Rumpelstiltskin, and Headless Horseman
- Aron Warner as Wolf
- Tom Kane as Guard No. 1
- Chris Miller as the Puppet Master
- Mark Valley as Cyclops
- Kari Wahlgren as Old Lady

== Production ==
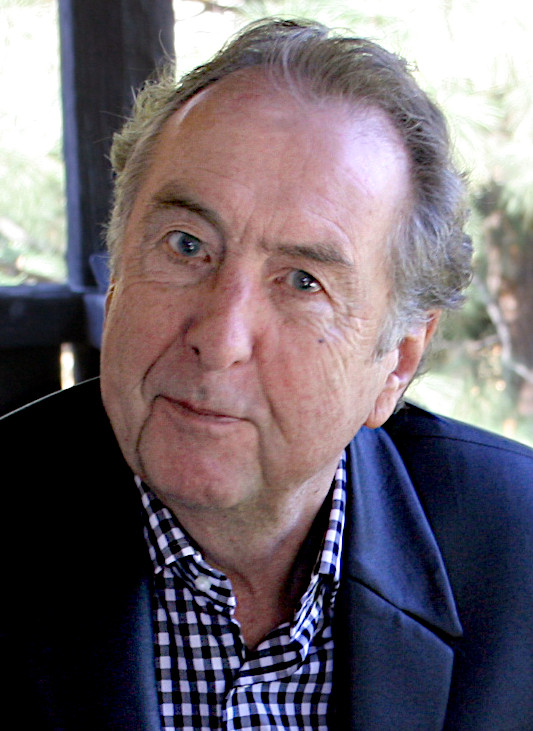
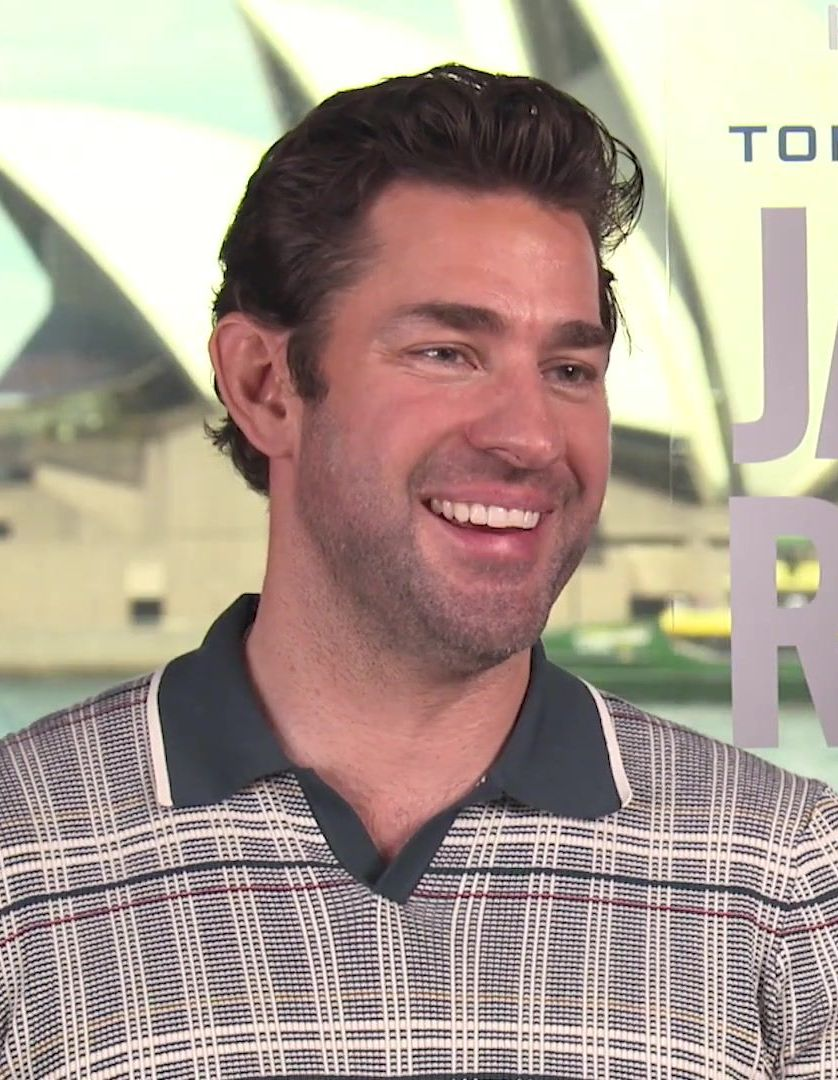
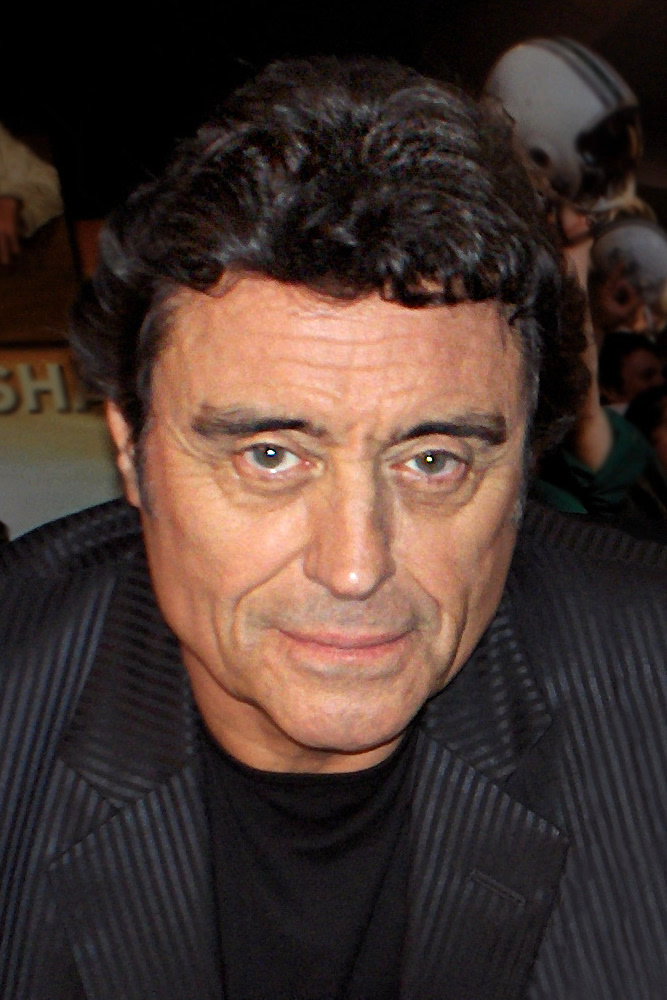
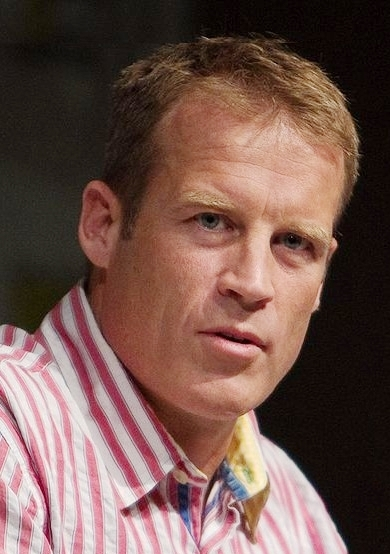
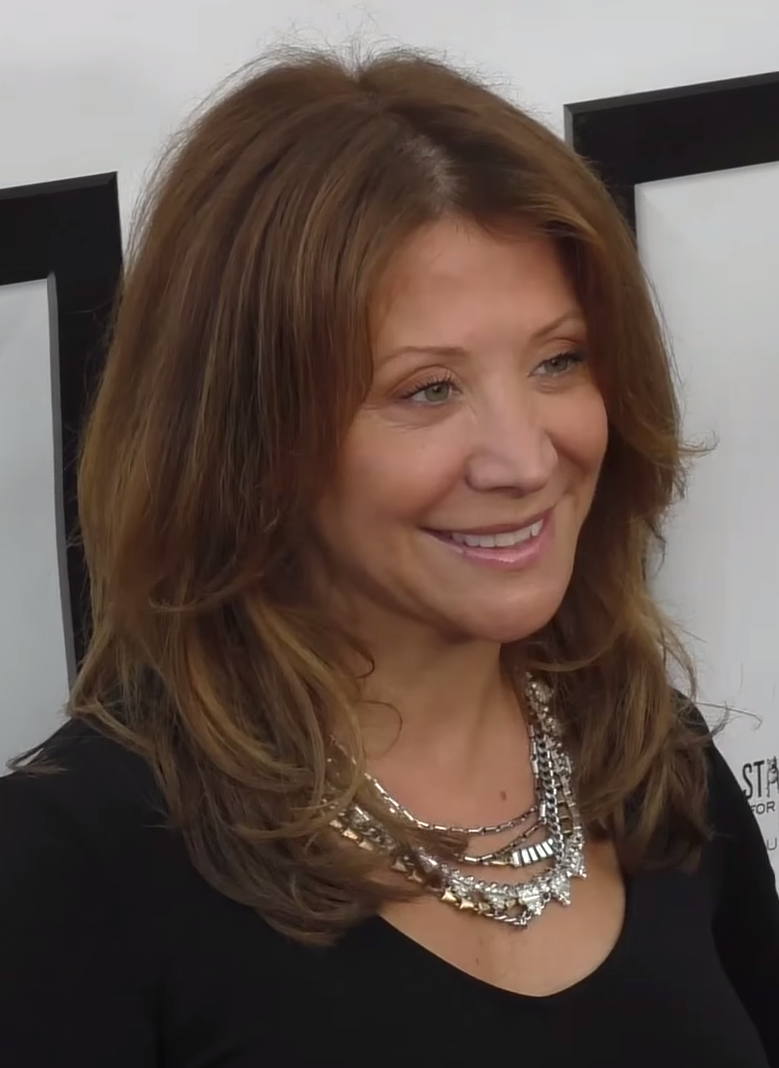
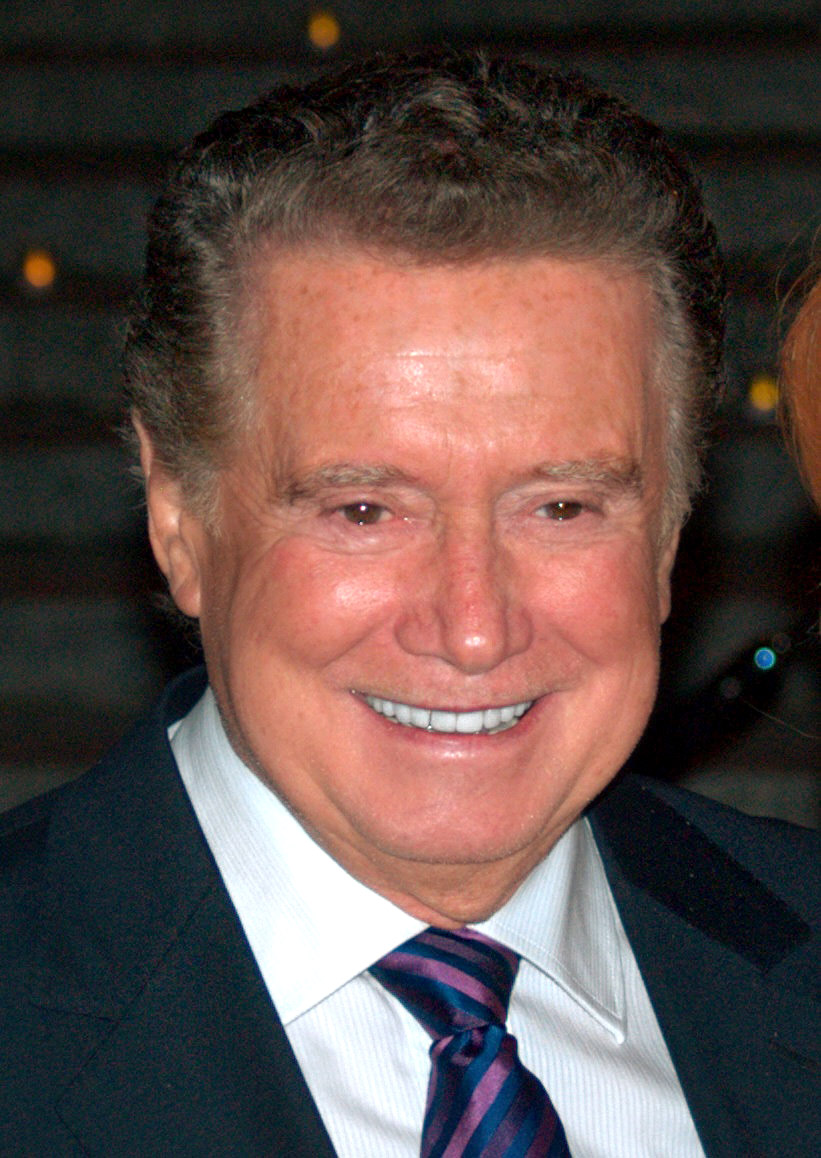
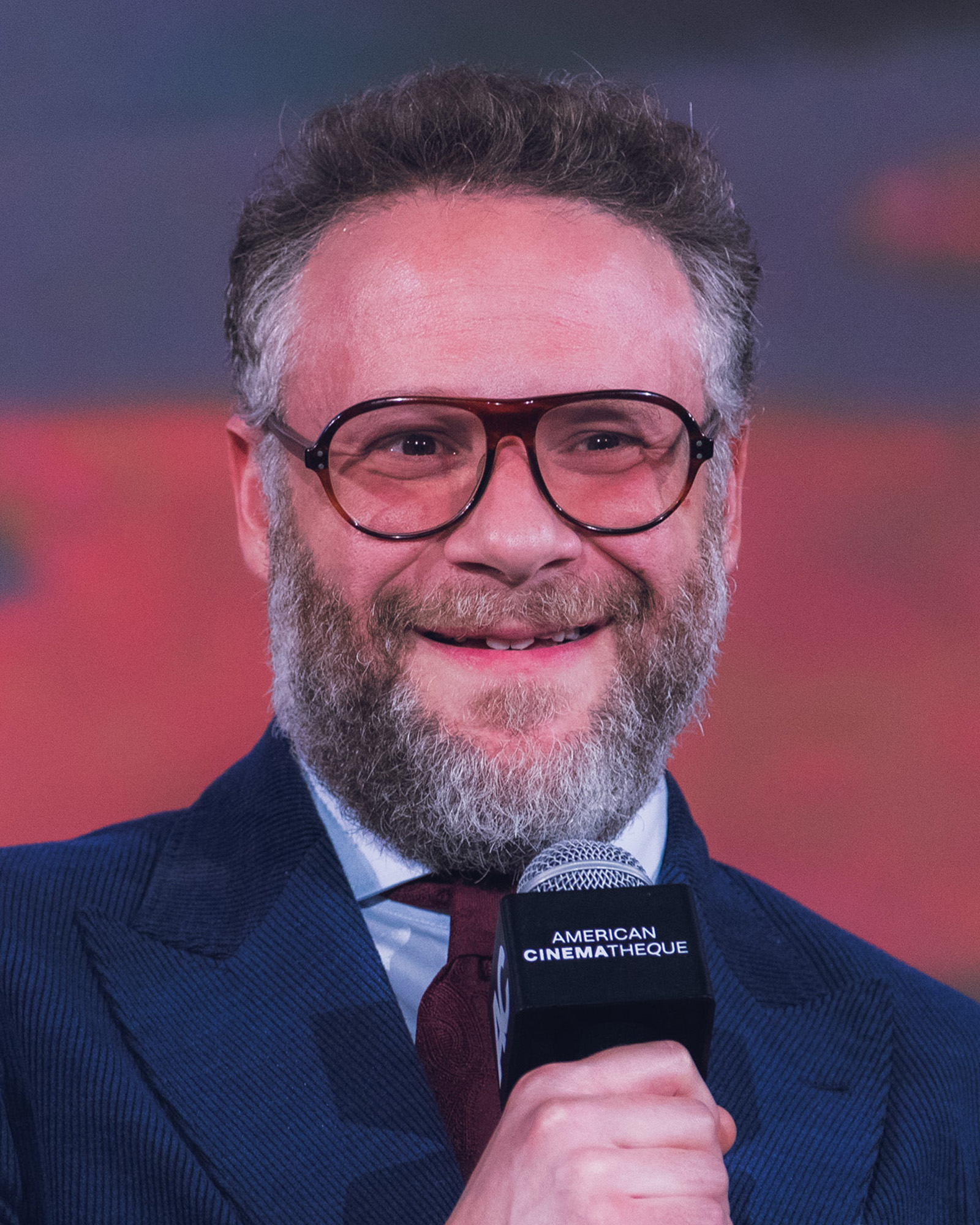
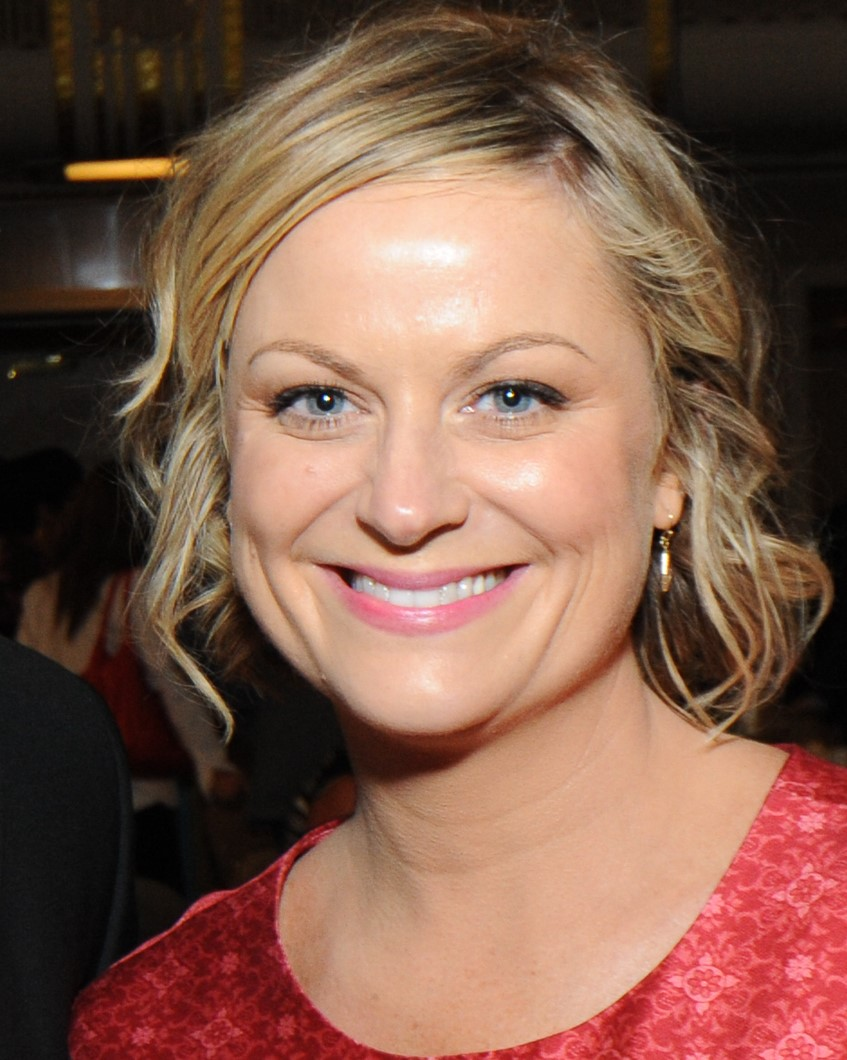
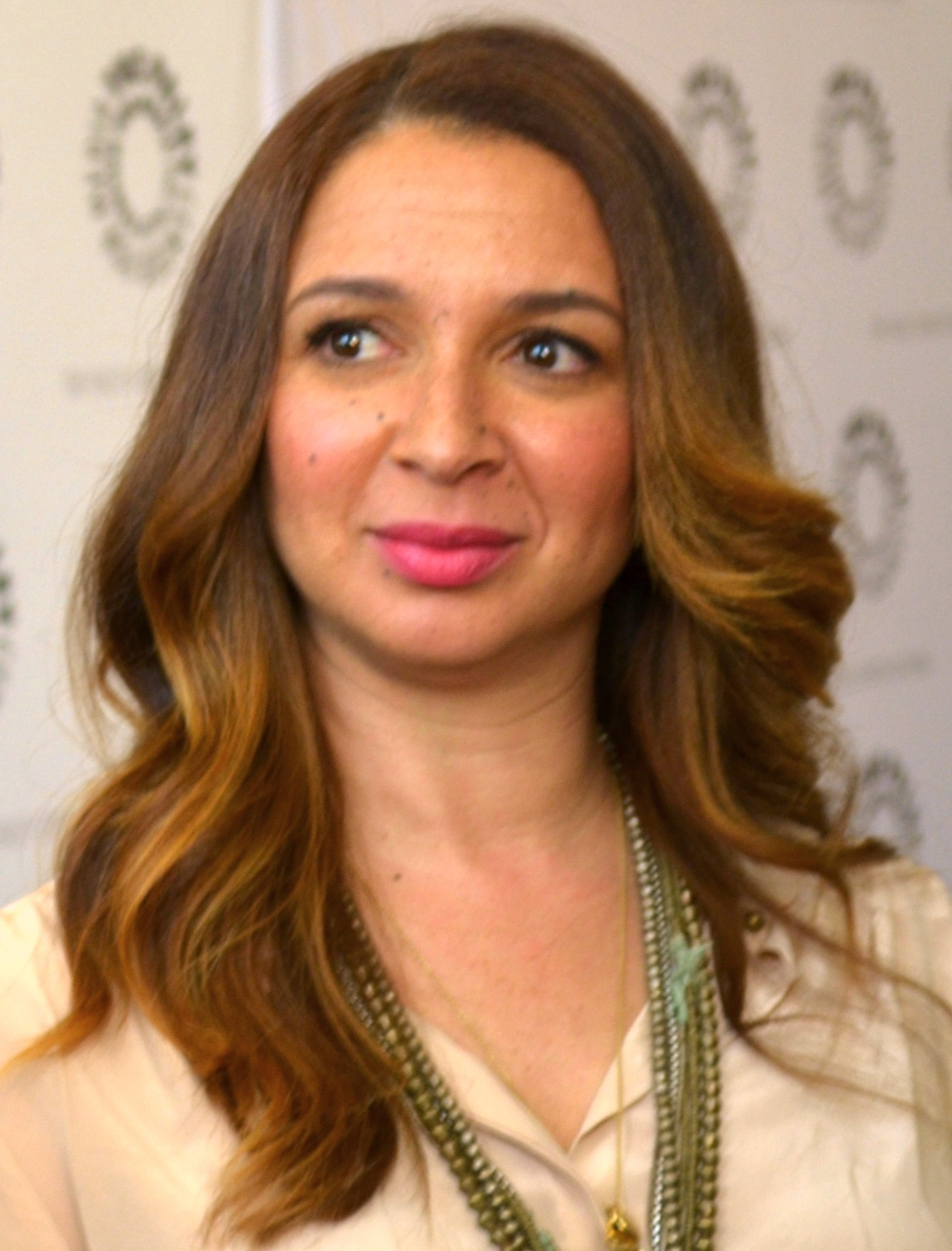
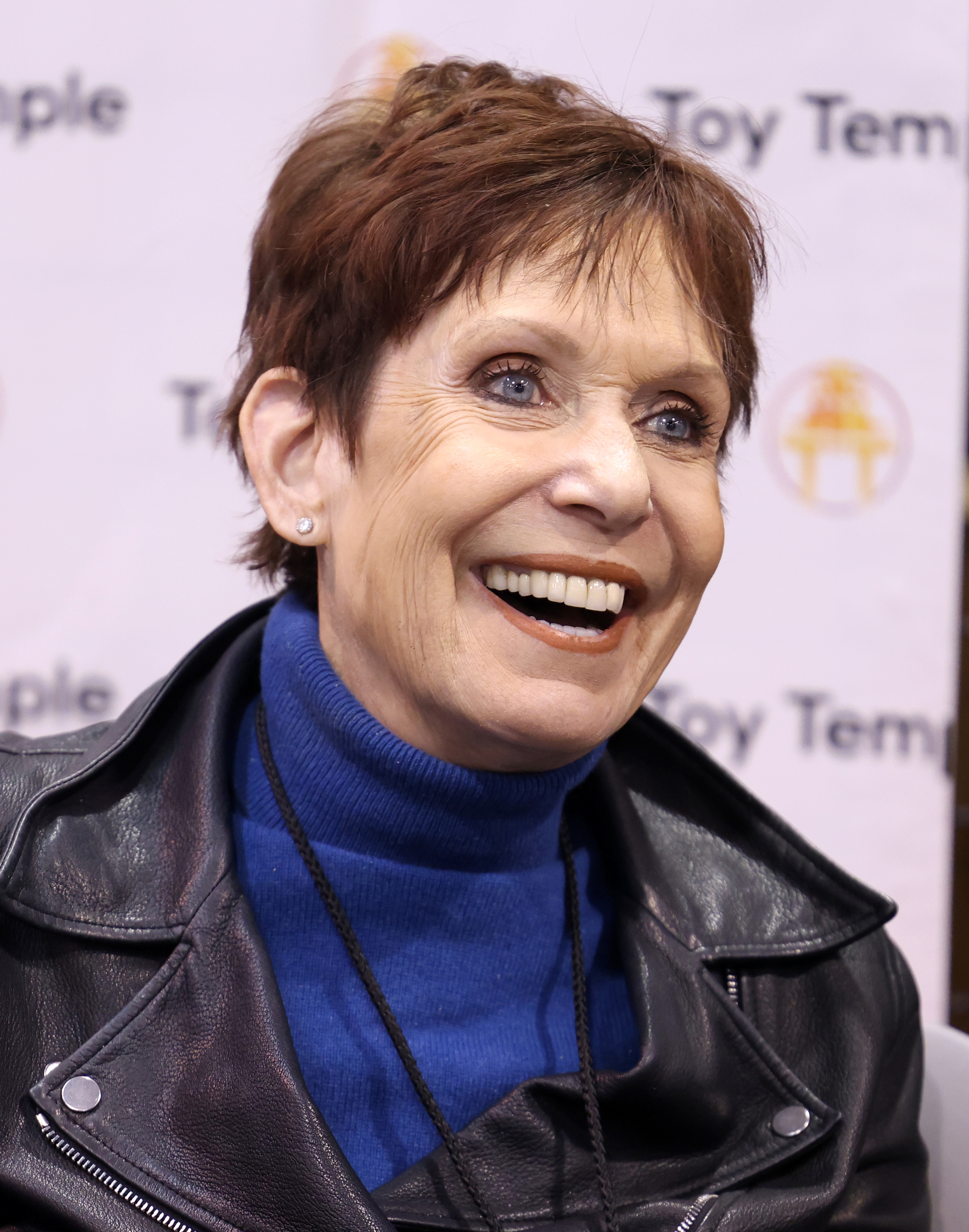
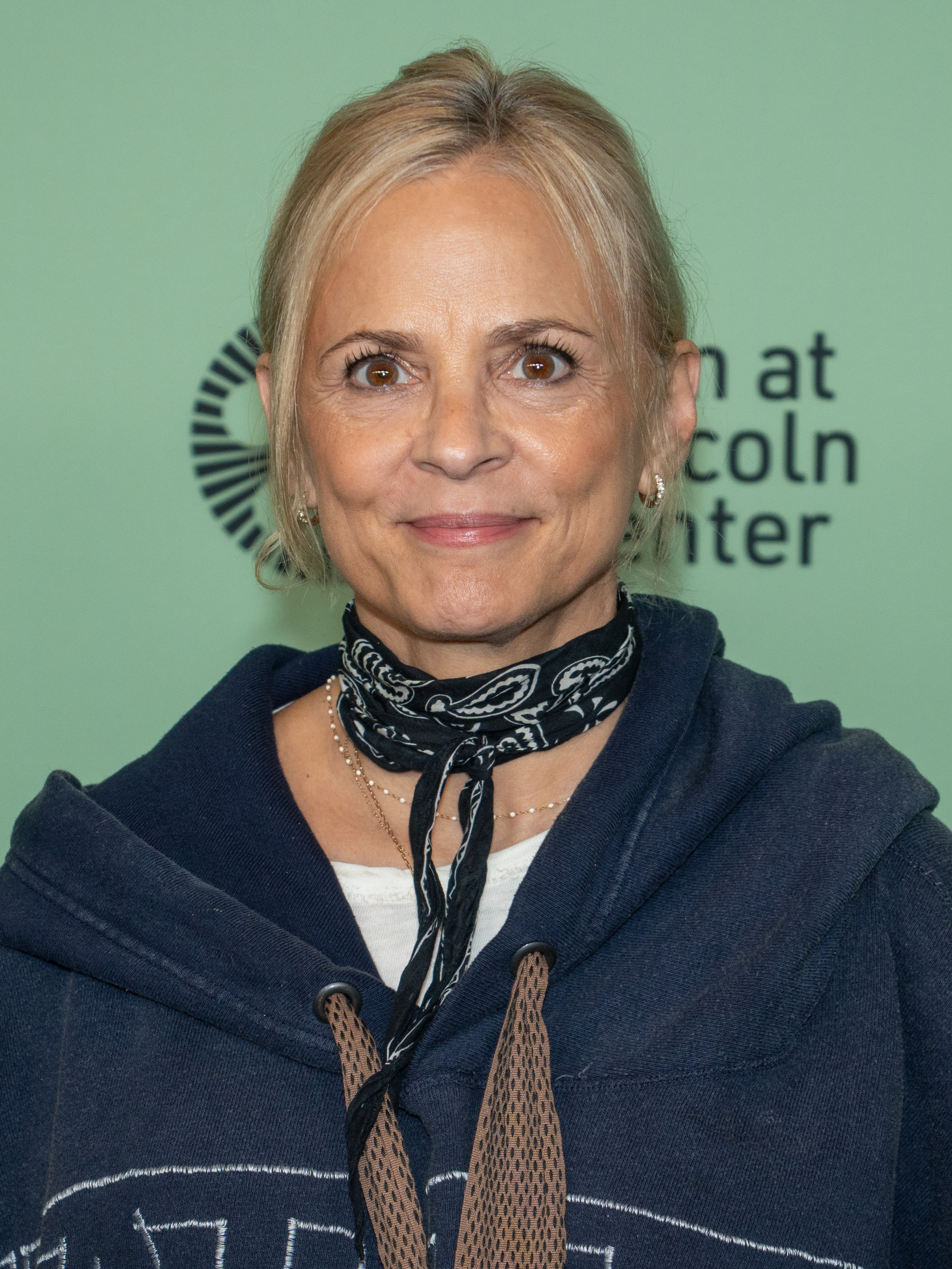
Top: Eric Idle, John Krasinski and Ian McShane provide the voices of Merlin, Sir Lancelot and Captain Hook.

Middle: Mark Valley, Cheri Oteri, Regis Philbin and Seth Rogen voice Cyclops, Sleeping Beauty, Mabel the Ugly Stepsister and Ship Captain.

Bottom: Amy Poehler, Maya Rudolph, Susanne Blakeslee and Amy Sedaris voice Snow White, Rapunzel, Evil Queen and Cinderella.

After the success of Shrek 2 in May 2004, DreamWorks Animation (DWA) CEO Jeffrey Katzenberg planned a five-film arc that began with Shrek (2001) and would conclude with a fifth installment. DreamWorks hired screenwriters Jeffrey Price and Peter S. Seaman (of Who Framed Roger Rabbit, Doc Hollywood and How the Grinch Stole Christmas fame) to write the screenplay of the film and Jon Zack, who wrote The Perfect Score, came on board as a consultant. Unlike the first two films, the film was not directed by Andrew Adamson due to his occupation with The Chronicles of Narnia: The Lion, the Witch and the Wardrobe. Adamson was still involved as an executive producer, and was giving advice approximately every four months on the state of the film. Shrek the Third was instead directed by Chris Miller, a story artist on the first film and a head of story on the second, and co-directed by Raman Hui, a supervising animator on the first two films, with Miller and producer Aron Warner also writing the script with Price and Seaman.

The film was developed under the working title of Shrek 3. By March 2006, the title of the film was changed to Shrek the Third. According to Miller, the reason behind the title change was because they "didn't want to just sort of title it like it was just a sequel," instead they wanted "something to make it stand on its own, give it its own personality and really try to treat it as a chapter in Shrek's life." Hui also remarked: "It's about Shrek becoming the new king of Far Far Away; the title sounds kind of royal as well."

The film was originally going to be released in November 2006; however, in December 2004, the date was changed to May 2007; "The sheer magnitude of the Shrek franchise has led us to conclude that a May release date, with a DVD release around the holiday season, will enable us to best maximize performance and increase profitability, thereby generating enhanced asset value and better returns for our shareholders." Katzenberg explained. Flushed Away, another film from DreamWorks Animation, was instead given the slot of November 2006. The release date change was also the day after Disney/Pixar changed the release date of Cars, from November 4, 2005, to June 9, 2006.

== Reception ==
=== Box office ===
Shrek the Third opened in 4,122 North American cinemas on May 18, 2007, grossing $38 million on its first day, which was the biggest opening day for an animated film at the time. The film would hold this record until Toy Story 3 surpassed it three years later in 2010. It grossed a total of $121.6 million in its first weekend, the best opening weekend ever for an animated film, and the second-highest opening for a film in the United States in 2007, behind Spider-Man 3. It held the animated opening weekend record for nine years until it was surpassed by Finding Dory's $135.1 million debut in 2016. At the time, its opening weekend was the third-highest of all time domestically, after Spider-Man 3 and Pirates of the Caribbean: Dead Man's Chest.

Shrek the Third grossed $322.7 million in the United States, and $485.6 million overseas, bringing its cumulative total to $808.3 million. The film was the fourth-highest-grossing film worldwide of 2007, and the second-highest-grossing film in the United States that year. In addition, it was the highest-grossing animated film of 2007, and the third-highest-grossing animated film ever, trailing only behind Finding Nemo and Shrek 2. The film sold an estimated 46,907,000 tickets in North America.

The film was released in the United Kingdom on June 29, 2007, and topped the country's box office for the next two weekends, before being dethroned by Harry Potter and the Order of the Phoenix.

=== Critical response ===
Shrek the Third received mixed reviews. On Rotten Tomatoes, Shrek the Third has an approval rating of 41% based on 209 reviews, with an average rating of 5.7/10, making it the lowest-rated film in the Shrek franchise by the website to date. The site's critical consensus reads, "Shrek the Third has pop culture potshots galore, but at the expense of the heart, charm, and wit that made the first two Shreks classics." On Metacritic, the film has a weighted average score of 58 out of 100, based on 35 critics, indicating "mixed or average reviews". Audiences polled by CinemaScore gave the film an average grade of "B+" on an A+ to F scale, the lowest grade in the franchise.

Some critics were confused as to the film's target demographic. Carina Chocano of the Los Angeles Times felt themes about career and parenting anxieties, the lifestyle of celebrities, as well as its humor, would be above children: "Does a kids' movie really need, among other similar touches, a Hooters joke? I, for one, wouldn't want to have to explain it." Nonetheless, she also found certain moments to be funny: "Shrek's anxiety dream about procreating is fabulously surreal, and King Harold's deathbed scene, with its grimaces and false alarms, is pure kiddie comedy at its best." David Ansen of Newsweek wrote that the film's "slightly snarky wit is aimed almost entirely at parents... this one never touched my heart or got under my skin. It's a movie at war with itself: a kiddie movie that doesn't really want to be one."

Peter Bradshaw of The Guardian gave the film 2 out of 5 stars, saying the film "wasn't awful, but it's bland, with a barrel-scraping averageness. There are no new ideas, no very funny new characters..." He called the character Merlin a "frankly unfunny new character" and considered the character to be a "rip-off of Albus Dumbledore from the Harry Potter franchise". He stated that the film contained "no decent musical numbers, incidentally, and the one cover version is bizarrely chosen. For Harold's funeral, we get a rendering of ... Paul McCartney's "Live and Let Die". Er ... huh? Because it's kind of sad and it has "die" in the title?"

The Times of London rated it 2 out of 5.

A. O. Scott from The New York Times described the film as "at once more energetic and more relaxed [than its predecessors], less desperate to prove its cleverness and therefore to some extent, smarter." Roger Ebert of the Chicago Sun-Times gave the film two and a half stars out of four, calling it a "damped-down return" that lacked the comic energy of the original and fell short of the second movie. Richard Roeper and Michael Phillips, both gave the film "Two Thumbs Down" on the television program, Ebert & Roeper and the Movies. Both of them criticized the film for its bland plot and the "Live and Let Die" musical scene.

Stephen Hunter of The Washington Post gave the film a similarly unfavorable review, calling it "paradox" that is both "quite funny and quite bad", and concluding that audiences would "laugh a lot and go home grumpy".

=== Awards and nominations ===
Awards	Category	Recipient	Result
Annie Awards	Directing in an Animated Feature Production	Chris Miller, Raman Hui	Nominated
BAFTA Awards	Best Animated Film	Chris Miller	Nominated
Golden Reel Award	Best Sound Editing in Feature Film: Animated		Nominated
Kids Choice Awards	Favorite Animated Movie		Nominated
Kids Choice Awards	Favorite Voice From an Animated Movie	Cameron Diaz	Nominated
Kids Choice Awards	Favorite Voice From an Animated Movie	Eddie Murphy	Won
Kids Choice Awards	Favorite Voice From an Animated Movie	Mike Myers	Nominated
People's Choice Awards	Favorite Family Movie		Won
VES Awards	Outstanding Effects in an Animated Motion Picture	Matt Baer, Greg Hart, Krzysztof Rost, Anthony Field	Nominated
VES Awards	Outstanding Performance by an Animated Character in an Animated Motion Picture	John Cleese, Guillaume Aretos, Tim Cheung, Sean Mahoney	Nominated

== Home media ==
The film was released on both DVD and HD DVD on November 13, 2007. The DVD was released in separate pan and scan and widescreen formats. The film and special features on the HD DVD version were presented in 1.78:1 widescreen high-definition 1080p and feature a Dolby Digital Plus 5.1 audio soundtrack, and special features for both formats include several deleted scenes, features, trailers, commentary, music videos, and exclusively on the HD DVD version, some web-enabled and HDi Interactive Format features such as a special trivia track, a film guide, and an interactive coloring book which can be downloaded as of street date.

Following Paramount's decision to discontinue HD DVD production (making Shrek the Third the only DreamWorks Animation film to be released on that format), the film was subsequently released on Blu-ray Disc on September 16, 2008. It was re-released on Blu-ray as part of the Shrek: The Whole Story boxset on December 7, 2010 before receiving another separate release on August 30, 2011, and on Blu-ray 3D on November 1, 2011, as a Best Buy exclusive. Shrek the Third was released on Ultra HD Blu-ray on September 12, 2023, by Universal Pictures Home Entertainment.

DVD and Blu-ray sales gathered revenue of $179.1 million.

== Marketing ==
Shrek the Third was widely anticipated and DreamWorks backed the film with a large marketing campaign, with toys, books, games, clothes, and many other items becoming available throughout 2007. A video game based on the film was released for the Wii, PlayStation 2, Xbox 360, Game Boy Advance, PlayStation Portable, PC, and Nintendo DS.

In May 2007, Shrek the Third was made into a mobile video game, developed by Gameloft. Shrek n' Roll, an action puzzle game based on the film, was released for the Xbox 360 via Xbox Live Arcade on November 14, 2007. A pinball machine based on the film has also been produced by Stern Pinball.

=== Satirical marketing effort ===
Adult Swim comedy team Tim and Eric, annoyed by the amount of advertisement they had witnessed in the months approaching the release of the film, decided to independently "promote" Shrek the Third in a series of internet videos as well as appearances on television and radio to encourage people to see the film.

== Controversy ==
In the beginning of the film, in Prince Charming's dinner theater, coconuts are revealed to be the source of the sound effect for horses' hoof beats. This same joke was used in Monty Python and the Holy Grail, which also starred John Cleese and Eric Idle. Idle walked out of the premiere (though later reentered after calming himself down) and claimed to be considering suing the producers of Shrek for the unauthorized use of this gag, while the producers claim they were honoring Idle and Cleese by putting the part in.

== Future ==
The film was followed by a sequel, Shrek Forever After, which was released in theaters on May 21, 2010, and will be followed by Shrek 5, which is in development and set for release on June 30, 2027.
