= Robert Kraus =

American cartoonist (1925–2001)

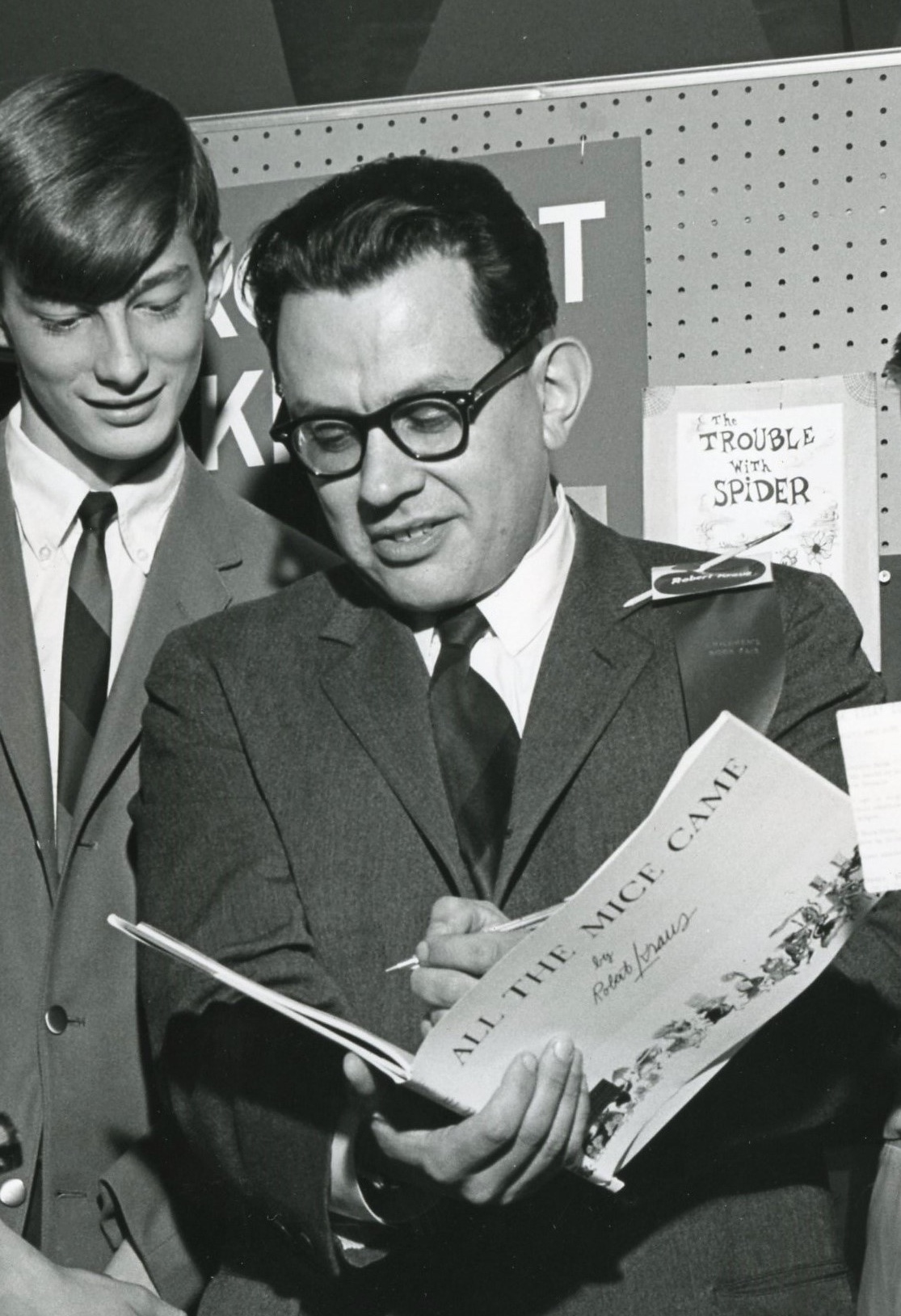
- Kraus in 1955
- Born: Herman Robert Kraus; June 21, 1925; Milwaukee, Wisconsin, U.S.
- Died: August 7, 2001 (aged 76); Kent, Connecticut, U.S.
- Resting place: Ridgefield, Connecticut
- Education: Layton School for the Arts
- Alma mater: Art Students League of New York
- Occupations: Artist, author, illustrator, publisher
- Spouse(s): Pamela Kraus, née Pamela Vivienne Evan-Wong
- Children: Bruce R. Kraus, Charles William Kraus
- Relatives: Father-in-law Robert Victor Evan-Wong
- Writing career
- Language: English
- Period: 1932-1995
- Genre: Children's literature
- Notable works: Leo the Late Bloomer (illustrations by Jose Aruego Milton the Early Riser (illustrations by Jose Aruego Harriet and the Promised Land (illustrations by Jacob Lawrence Amanda Remembers The Bunny's Nutshell Library
- Notable awards: Caldecott Medal (as publisher of William Steig's Roland the Minstrel Pig)

Robert Kraus (June 21, 1925 – August 7, 2001) was an American children's author illustrator, cartoonist and publisher. His successful career began early at the New Yorker Magazine, producing hundreds of cartoons and nearly two dozen covers for the magazine over 15 years. Afterwards, he pivoted his career to children's literature, writing and illustrating over 100 children’s books and publishing even more as the founder of publishing house Windmill Books (later an imprint of Simon & Schuster). His body of work is best remembered for depicting animal heroes who always try their best and never give up, which were ideals important to him at an early age.

== Biography ==
=== Personal ===
Robert Kraus was born in Milwaukee, Wisconsin in 1925 to parents Jack, who was in the real estate business, and Esther (Rosen) Kraus. His mother nurtured lessons in him that appear as important themes in Kraus's later written work in the children’s literature genre. He graduated from Milwaukee’s Layton School of Art in 1942 and the Art Students League of New York in 1945. During that time, Kraus was excluded from the military during WWII because of vision problems. He met his wife, Pamela (formerly Pamela Vivienne Evan-Wong), while at the Art Students League and they were married on December 11, 1946. Together they had two sons, Bruce and Bill. In 1965, he moved into the 1865 Colonial Revival House in Ridgefield, Connecticut on the corner of Main Street and Branchville Road where he was often seen in the community walking his pug, Hoover.

=== Early career ===
At age 10, Kraus won a cartoon contest from his local paper the Milwaukee Journal. By age 12, he was hired by that same journal to contribute a weekly cartoon entitled "Public Nuisances." At age 16, he made his first cartoon sale to The New Yorker, which was the most prestigious platform for cartoon prints in the nation at the time Kraus also freelanced for other publications such as Collier's, the old Life, Esquire Magazine, and The Saturday Evening Post. He continued both his education and freelance work at the Arts Student League of Manhattan, NY until he became a full-time employee at the New Yorker on contract.

== Cartoons ==
He became a regular New Yorker contributor as both a cartoonist and cover artist beginning in the 1950s. Kraus contributed 50 cartoons in his first year at the "New Yorker." Most of his cover art reflected his romantic idea of the City (artists' studios and supplies, a chess club, a gypsy fortune teller, the Chinese New Year parade, the Coney Island roller coaster, a grand cafe, St. Patrick's Cathedral, a fancy dress ball) and he recorded his rural surroundings in Danbury, Connecticut, with its farmer's markets and county fairs. Many of his cartoons embodied the stereotypes of their day: drunks, crooks, convicts, pirates, clowns, mythological characters, millionaires dating floozies, big businessmen, prizefighters, etc. An important part of his cartooning career was a multi-page spread on the New York World's Fair of 1963-64. In his 15 years at the New Yorker, Kraus produced over 450 cartoons and 21 covers. In 1983, after taking an extended break from cartooning to work on children’s literature, Kraus created a Sunday feature called “Zap! The Video Chap,” targeted at children who were growing addicted to playing video games.

== Children's books ==
In 1955, Kraus decided to pivot his career. He began writing and illustrating children's books, beginning with Junior the Spoiled Cat, The Littlest Rabbit, The Trouble with Spider (later expanded into the Spider, Fly and Ladybug series), I, Mouse, Mouse at Sea, The Bunny's Nutshell Library, Carla Stevens' Rabbit and Skunk series, and the haunting and critically acclaimed Amanda Remembers. The book Leo the Late Bloomer, an encouraging story about making one's own pace, is a continuing legacy. He utilized his extensive network of creators from the New Yorker to team up with illustrators like William Steig and Charles Addams.

Kraus could speak directly to children without a trace of artificiality or condescension, naturally embodying both them and himself in a variety of small but plucky animal protagonists. His stories often centered on animal heroes with humanistic qualities, teaching lessons like “never give up” and always do your best even if you don’t at first succeed,” which Kraus learned from his mother. He once explained that he wrote children’s books to console himself, encourage himself and others, and investigate problems he observed in society. The story, “Miranda’s Beautiful Dream” was inspired by the life of Martin Luther King. The book Leo the Late Bloomer, an encouraging story about making one's own pace, is a continuing legacy. Kraus once said that “the greatest compliment anyone can give you is to buy your stuff.”

== Academia ==
The Windmill Books and Robert Kraus Papers are among the University of Minnesota's Children's Literature and Art Collections.

Professor Paul Fry has used one of Kraus's lesser works, Tony the Tow Truck, tongue-in-cheek to teach a popular English course at Yale, Introduction to the Theory of Literature, using its hundred-word text to illustrate topics such as Hermeneutics, Semiotics, Structuralism, Deconstruction, Queer Theory and Gender Performativity.

== Windmill Books publishing company ==
Tapping his friendships with other New Yorker artists, Kraus launched a small publishing company, Windmill Books in 1965, publishing The Chas. Addams Mother Goose, and William Steig's Roland the Minstrel Pig, followed by Steig's Caldecott Medal-winning Sylvester and the Magic Pebble. The prestige of Windmill even attracted renowned painter Jacob Lawrence, whose Harriet and the Promised Land (with verse by Kraus) became the first children's book reviewed in the Art section of the New York Times and was recently featured in the Lawrence retrospective at the Guggenheim. Kraus soon quit the New Yorker to run Windmill full-time, as publisher, and wrote and illustrated books for Windmill as well as for Scholastic and other publishers. Windmill artists included Fred Gwynne (the actor), Edna Eicke, Robert Byrd, Hans Kraus (no relation), VIP (Virgil Partch) and Mischa Richter. Windmill published a set of Norman Rockwell covers with original backstories (which Kraus wrote in consultation with Rockwell) as The Norman Rockwell Storybook and with filmmaker Robert Flaherty produced a children's book version of Flaherty's Nanook of the North. Windmill also pioneered "board" and "bathtub" books that doubled as toys for very small children, and dabbled in pop culture with its Elvis calendar and Encyclopedia Galactica.

In spite of its flirtations with the mass market, in the end Windmill Books proved to be more of a succès d'estime than anything else. The company struggled through legal difficulties with its distributor and was forced to sign over to Simon & Schuster in the 1980s. Steig's best-known children's book, Shrek, was published elsewhere. Kraus and Windmill are probably best remembered as the author and publisher of Leo the Late Bloomer, Whose Mouse Are You, Milton the Early Riser, and other books imaginatively illustrated by Jose Aruego and Arianne Dewey, as well as the seasonal favorite The Christmas Cookie Sprinkle Snitcher, illustrated by VIP. Kraus wrote stories, but his passion was drawing and illustrating—He once said, "I love drawing...Giving my stories to somebody else was like giving a way a child." In total before its sale, Windmill House had published over two hundred books on three continents.

== Honors and reception ==
Reviewers from the New York Times praise Kraus’ simple but meaningful style and tone. In regards to his book “Old-Fashioned Raggedy Ann & Andy ABC Book,” illustrated by Johnny Gruelle, they write “Evoking nostalgia, this simple--yet elegant--dictionary is based on the-way-it-used-to-be stylized illustrations and delightful rhymes.” His stories, Whose Mouse Are You?, Milton the Early Riser, and Owliver were named notable children’s books by the American Library Association. His book Herman the Helper was a Trade Book Award Winner and appeared on the Horn Book Honor List. In the more visible public domain, his story Leo the Late Bloomer was read on national television by former First Lady Barbara Bush during her campaign to promote children’s literacy. A collection of his manuscripts are stored and preserved at Syracuse University.

== Death ==
Kraus died of heart failure in a nursing home in 2001 in Kent, Connecticut. He is buried at Fairlawn Cemetery in Ridgefield, Connecticut, and etched on his gravestone is an image of a spider, a character from one of his books. He is survived by his wife of more than 50 years, the former Pamela Vivienne Evan-Wong, of Georgetown, British Guiana, a fellow student at the New York Art Students' League, and by their two sons, Bruce and Bill and four grandchildren Parker, Jack, Margaret and Vivienne.

== Bibliography ==
Author Only
Book Title	Publisher	Year
Harriet and the Promised Land	Windmill Books	1968
Whitney Darrow, Jr.'s Unidentified Lying Elephant	Windmill Books	1968
The Children Who Got Married	Windmill Books	1969
Animal Etiquette	Windmill Books	1969
Don't Talk to Strange Bears	Windmill Books	1969
Rumple-Nose Dimple and the Three Horrible Snaps	Windmill Books	1969
The Christmas Cookie Sprinkle Snitcher	Windmill Books	1969
The Rabbit Brothers, Anti-Defamation League of B'nai B'rith		1969
I'm Glad I'm a Boy, I'm Glad I'm a Girl	Windmill Books	1970
Whose Mouse Are You?	Macmillan	1970
Vip's Mistake Book	Windmill Books	1970
Bunya the Witch	Windmill Books	1971
Shaggy Fur Face	Windmill Books	1971
Ludwig, the Dog Who Snored Symphonies	Windmill Books	1971
Pipsqueak, Mouse in Shining Armor	Windmill Books	1971
Lillian, Morgan and Teddy	Windmill Books	1971
The Tree That Stayed Up Until Next Christmas	Windmill Books	
Leo the Late Bloomer	Windmill Books	1971
Milton the Early Riser	Windmill Books	1972
How Spider Saved Halloween	Parents Magazine Press	1973
Big Brother	Parents Magazine Press	1973
Pip Squeaks Through	Springfellow Press	1973
Poor Mister Splinterfitz!	Dutton	1973
Rebecca Hatpin	Windmill Books	1974
Pinchpennny Mouse	Windmill Books	1974
Owliver	Windmill Books	1974
Herman the Helper	Windmill Books	1974
Three Friends	Windmill Books	1975
I'm a Monkey	Windmill Books	1975
The Night-Light Story Book	Windmill Books	1975
The Gondolier of Venice	Windmill Books	1975
Boris Bad Enough	Windmill Books	1976
Dinosaur Do's and Don'ts	Windmill Books	1976
The Good Mousekeeper	Windmill Books	1977
The Detective of London (co-written with son, Bruce Kraus)	Windmill Books	1977
Noel the Coward	Windmill Books	1977
Springfellow	Windmill Books	1978
Musical Max	Windmill Books	1979
Another Mouse to Feed	Windmill Books	809
Mouse Work	Windmill Books	1980
Mert the Blurt	Windmill Books	1980
Puppet Pal Books (a four volume collection)	Windmill Books	1981
The Old Fashioned Raggedy Ann & Andy ABC Book	Windmill Books / Simon and Schuster	1981
The King's Trousers	Windmill Books	1981
Leo the Late Bloomer Takes a Bath	Windmill Books	1981
Herman the Helper Cleans Up	Windmill Books	1981
See the Christmas Lights	Windmill Books	1981
Box of Brownies (a four volume collection)	Windmill Books	1981
Tony the Truck	Grosset & Dunlap	1985
Mrs. Elmo of Elephant House	Delacorte Press	1986
Where Are You Going, Little Mouse?	Greenwillow Books	1986
Screamy Mimi	Simon & Schuster	1987
Come Out and Play, Little Mouse	Greenwillow Books	1987
The Hoodwinking of Mrs. Elmo	Delacorte Press	1987
Robert Kraus' A Sunny Day in Babytown	Little Simon	1987
Robert Kraus' Babytown Express	Little Simon	1987
Robert Kraus' Meet the Babies	Little Simon	1987
Robert Kraus' Welcome to Babytown	Little Simon	1987
Little Beep	Little Simon	1987
Tiny Tow Truck	Little Simon	1987
How Spider Saved Easter	Scholastic	1988
Noah Count Vampire Detective in Mummy Vanishes: A Mummy Dearest Creepy Hollow Whoooooooodunnit?	Warner Juvenile Books	1988
How Spider Saved Thanksgiving	Scholastic	1991
How Spider Saved the Flea Circus	Scholastic	1991
How Spider Stopped the Litterbugs	Scholastic	1991
Dr. Mouse, Bungle Jungle Doctor	Western	1992
All My Chickens	Western	1993
Dance, Spider, Dance!	Western	1993
The Adventures of Wise Old Owl	Troll Assosciates	1993
Jack O'Lantern's Scary Halloween	Western	1993
Fables Aesop Never Wrote but Robert Kraus Did	Viking	1994
Near Myths: Dug Up and Dusted Off	Viking	1996
Big Squeak, Little Squeak	Orchard Books	1996
O'Malley	Orchard Books	1996
Little Louie the Baby Bloomer	Harper Collins	1998
The Making of Monkey King (retold with Debby Chen)	Pan Asian Publications	1998
Mort the Sport	Orchard Books	2000
Mouse in Love	Orchard Books	2000

Illustrator Only
Book	Author	Publisher	Year
Red Fox and the Hungry Tiger	Paul Anderson	Addison-Wesley	1962
Rabbit and Skunk and the Scary Rock	Carla Stevens	Scholastic	1962
Rabbit and Skunk and the Big Fight	Carla Stevens	Scholastic	1964
Rabbit and Skunk and Spooks	Carla Stevens	Scholastic	1967
Cleveland Amory's Animail	Cleveland Amory	Dutton	1976

Author and Illustrator
Book	Publisher	Year
Junior the Spoiled Cat	Oxford University Press	1955
All the Mice Came	Harper	1955
Ladybug, Ladybug	Harper	1955
The Littlest Rabbit	Harper	1957
I, Mouse	Harper	1958
The Trouble with Spider	Harper	1962
Miranda's Beautiful Dream	Harper	1964
Penguin's Pal	Harper	1964
Mouse at Sea	Harper	1964
Amanda Remembers	Harper	1965
"The Bunny's Nutshell" library series: The Silver Dandelion; Juniper; The First Robin; Springfellow's Parade	Harper	1965
My Son, the Mouse	Harper	1967
Little Giant	Harper	1967
Hello Hippopotamus (under pseudonym Eugene H. Hippopotamus)	Windmill Books	1969
Daddy Long Ears	Windmill Books	1970
How Spider Saved Christmas	Windmill Books	1970
The Tale Who Wagged the Dog	Windmill Books	1971
"The Night Light" library series: Good Night, Little One; Good Night, Little ABC; Good Night, Little Richard Ravvit	Sprinfellow	1972
Animal Families	Windmill Books	1980
See the Moon	Windmill Books	1980
How Spider Saved Turkey	Windmill Books	1981
The Old-Fashioned Raggedy Ann and Andy ABC Book	Windmill Books / Simon & Schuster	1982
Bumpy the Car	Putnam	1985
Squeaky (under pseudonym S. Silly)	Windmill Books	1982
Squeaky's One Man Band (under pseudonym S. Silly)	Windmill Books	1982
I'm a Little Airplane (under pseudonym I.M. Tubby)	Tubby Books	1982
I'm a Little Fish (under pseudonym I.M. Tubby)	Tubby Books	1982
I'm a Little House (under pseudonym I.M. Tubby)	Tubby Books	1982
I'm a Little Tugboat (under pseudonym I.M. Tubby)	Tubby Books	1982
Freddy and the Fire Engine	Putnam	1985
How Spider Saved Valentine's Day	Scholastic	1986
Spider's First Day at School	Scholastic	1987
Happy City	Simon & Schuster	1987
Happy Farm	Simon & Schuster	1987
Spider's Home Town: A Story to Color	Scholastic	1988
Here Comes Tardy Toad	Silver Press	1989
Ella the Bad Speller	Silver Press	1989
Good Morning, Miss Gator	Silver Press	1989
Buggy Bear Cleans Up	Silver Press	1989
How Spider Saved the Baseball Game	Scholastic	1989
Phil, the Ventriloquist	Greenwillow	1989
Daddy Long Ears Christmas Surprise	Simon & Schuster	1990
Daddy Long Ears Halloween	Simon & Schuster	1990
Private Eyes Don't Blink	Warner Books	1990
Spider's Baby-Sitting Job	Scholastic	1990
Spider's Draw-a-Long Book	Scholastic	1990
Creepy Hollow Ghostly Glowing Haunted House	Warner Books	1990
Boogie Woogie Bears Go Back to Nature	Warner Books	1990
Boogie Woogie Bears' Picnic	Warner Books	1990
Jack Galaxy, Space Cop	Bantam	1990
Klunky Monkey, New Kid in Class	Bantam	1990
Mixed-Up Mice Clean House	Warner Books	1990
Mixed-Up Mice in the Big Birthday Mix-Up	Warner Books	1990
Mummy Knows Best	Warner Books	1990
Mummy Vanishes	Warner Books	1990
Musical Max	Simon & Schuster	1990
The Phantom of Creepy Hollow	Warner Books	1990
Squirmy's big Secret (with Bonnie Brook)	Silver Press	1990
Wise Old Owl's Halloween Adventure (with Pamela Kraus)	Troll	1993
Wise Old Owl's Christmas Adventure (with Pamela Kraus)	Troll	1993
