= Dragon (Shrek) =

Dragon in the Shrek franchise

- Shrek character
- Dragon as she appears in Shrek Forever After
- First appearance: Shrek! (1990 book); Shrek (2001 film)
- Created by: William Steig
- Adapted by: Ted Elliott; Terry Rossio; Joe Stillman; Roger S. H. Schulman

In-universe information
- Species: Dragon
- Gender: Female
- Weapon: Fire breath
- Spouse: Donkey
- Children: Debbie, Coco, Bananas, Peanut, Parfait & Eclair

Dragon is a fictional character from the Shrek franchise, who is initially believed to be a fearsome villain guarding Princess Fiona. In a twist, she is revealed to be female and in search of love. While she is abandoned during Shrek's escape, she later becomes his ally and the wife of his sidekick, Donkey, helping defeat the evil Lord Farquaad by eating him whole. She has since appeared in every series film in some regard, with a parallel universe version becoming a villain in Shrek Forever After. Also appearing in spin-offs, she is commonly seen as a puppet in stage adaptations of the series such as Shrek the Musical.

Dragon has become well-known in pop culture, and been noted as a satire of animated Disney dragons. Her appearance and role were praised by critics, some of whom praised her unexpectedly kind and heroic nature as a feminist twist on the trope of a male knight slaying a dragon to rescue a princess.

== Characteristics ==
Dragon resembles most classical interpretations of European dragons. She has keeled, ruby-colored scales, leathery bat-like wings, long, crested ears, bony spikes along her jawline, a row of dorsal spines, vertical slit pupils, and a long, spade-tipped, prehensile tail. Dragon does not speak, but does employ physically expressive body language to communicate. Like her mate Donkey, she is never given a proper name in the film. Donkey at one point says "I'm coming, Elizabeth!" While this is the only in-film reference to "Elizabeth" as her proper name, it can also be taken as a reference to Fred G. Sanford of the television series Sanford and Son.

Dragon's personality is tender-hearted, despite having so few visitors that she incinerates any apparent knights sight-unseen. Similarly lonely as Princess Fiona, she regularly puts on lipstick in the hopes of finding a romantic partner.

== Development ==
The animators of Shrek initially had Dragon breathe realistic fire for the film's rescue scene, similar to that used in torches and candles, but realized it looked unnaturally forced. Instead, they replaced it with a stream of roiling bubbles rendered with fluid technology, which was then coated with a skin of flame.

== Appearances ==
=== Film series ===
Dragon has the task of guarding Princess Fiona in her isolated castle. While Shrek attempts to rescue the princess, Donkey finds himself at the mercy of Dragon. Upon learning that his captor is female, Donkey begins spouting flattery in order to distract her. Dragon becomes infatuated with him, despite the fact that her love is unrequited. As a result, she picks him up in her teeth and carries him to her chambers, where she wraps him in her tail and flirts with him. Shrek soon comes back to "save his ass" (a pun referring to Donkey), and the trio escape from Dragon's castle, leaving a chained and miserable dragoness in their wake. Dragon is not seen again until later in the film, having escaped and abandoned Fiona's volcanic keep. She and Donkey make amends, and aid Shrek in his quest to save Fiona from her marriage to Lord Farquaad. Dragon disposes of Farquaad by swallowing him. Dragon soon grabs the bouquet of flowers Fiona tosses at her and Shrek's marriage and presents them to Donkey. Donkey smiles lovingly, and the two nuzzle and also become wed.

Dragon is absent for much of Shrek 2, but becomes one of Shrek's best friends prior to its events. Donkey claims at the film's beginning that she had been "all moody and stuff" recently, explaining his unannounced arrival at Shrek's swamp. Nevertheless, Dragon makes a full appearance in a post-credits scene, in which she arrives with six young "dronkeys" - dragon-donkey hybrids that meet their clueless father for the first time.

In Shrek the Third, Dragon and her young dronkeys stay behind with Fiona and the other "princess" characters to await Shrek's return. When Prince Charming attacks Far Far Away, Dragon is captured and disarmed by a large iron chain cast net; her dronkey offspring are caught and imprisoned, as well. At the film's climax, Dragon helps dispose of Prince Charming by knocking over a stone stage prop keep on top of him. She is later seen in Shrek's swamp while Shrek and Fiona are caring for their ogre triplets.

In the series' fourth film, Shrek Forever After, Dragon appears briefly at the beginning of the film, but reappears later in a parallel universe where she never met Donkey, having been captured by Rumpelstiltskin. She attempts to eat Shrek and Fiona, and despite Donkey's attempts at romance, almost devours him before he is saved by Puss in Boots. The parallel Dragon ends up muzzled and bound in chains after being stopped by Shrek and Fiona, fading out of existence as the real world is restored. She is shown to be back to her normal self in the film's finale.

=== Shrek 4-D ===
Dragon helps Shrek and Donkey evade a statue of a dragon that had been brought to life. Dragon attempts to battle the creature, and succeeds, luring it into a narrow tunnel where its wings are scraped off while Dragon folds her wings against her body while traveling through it, subsequently torching Farquaad's ghost.

=== Stage ===
Dragon appeared in the stage musical adaptation of the film, which ran on Broadway from 2008 to 2010, as a puppet controlled by John Tartaglia.

== Reception ==
In a contemporaneous review of Shrek, Roger Ebert called the revelation about Dragon something "no one could have guessed". Petrana Radulovic of Polygon called Dragon "sexy" and a pop-culture icon, saying that the plot twist was "revolutionary" and that she "definitely should've been featured in more movies".

While initially seeming like a villainess, and therefore more similar to dragon characters like Beowulf's dragon and Smaug, Dragon was instead noted as being a satire of Disney dragons, like those featured in The Reluctant Dragon (1941), Sleeping Beauty (1959), and Pete's Dragon (1977), and one of numerous Disney figures parodied in the series. While the romance between Dragon and Donkey is "kinky", it serves the purpose to distract from the even more shocking intermarriage of human and ogre. Despite this, the interspecies romance and ensuing family is only "permitted" due to the fact that it is between non-humans. The relationship was called a visual realization of the film's moral message that appearances are not important, but at the same time, seemingly impossible due to the difference in size.

Dragon's femininity was noted as a "major departure" from typical fairy tale gender roles, in which most dragons are either masculine or gender-neutral. While Grendel's mother in Beowulf is one of the most prominent examples of a female monster in folklore, her gender is not relevant to the plot. According to controversial post-1960s theories about the history of civilisation, as patriarchal social structures were established, pre-agrarian goddesses, once thought as symbols of wisdom and life, were called monsters and emblems of evil, eventually giving rise to the trope of a knight slaying a dragon, though this is itself a trope dating back to at least early Indo-European times. While the dragon traditionally represents a chaotic, chthonic principle in general, in feminist thought, dragons can also be more narrowly understood as the maiden's double, representing their autonomy, with the knight slaying the dragon to make the maiden his servant or wife. In Shrek, the patriarchal dragon slaying trope is "gloriously" reversed, with Dragon ultimately intervening to bring about the happy ending.
