= Listen, Little Man! =

1945 essay by Wilhelm Reich

- Author: Wilhelm Reich
- Original title: Rede an den kleinen Mann
- Language: German
- Publisher: Orgone Institute Press, Farrar, Straus and Giroux
- Publication date: 1945
- Media type: Essay

Listen, Little Man! (German: Rede an den kleinen Mann) is a 1945 essay by Austro-Hungarian-American psychologist Wilhelm Reich, originally published by Reich's own Orgone Institute Press, and re-published in 1965 by Farrar, Straus and Giroux, which described the work as follows: "A great physician's quiet talk to each one of us, the average human being, the Little Man. Written in 1946 in answer to the gossip and defamation that plagued his remarkable career, it tells how Reich watched, at first naively, then with amazement, and finally with horror, at what the Little Man does to himself; how he suffers and rebels; how he esteems his enemies and murders his friends; how, wherever he gains power as a 'representative of the people', he misuses this power and makes it crueler than the power it has supplanted". Listen, Little Man! was illustrated by cartoonist and author William Steig, a supporter and personal friend of Reich's, best known today as the author of the children's book Shrek! (1990), upon which the hit films were based. It was first translated into English in 1948, by Theodore Peter Wolfe, and again in 1965, by Ralph Manheim.

Reich was a respected analyst for the greatest part of his life, focusing on character structure, rather than on individual neurotic symptoms. He promoted adolescent sexuality, the availability of contraceptives and abortion, and the importance of economic independence for women. Drawing freely from psychoanalysis, cultural anthropology, economics, sociology, and ethics, his work became influential to writers, such as Alexander Lowen, Fritz Perls, Paul Goodman, Saul Bellow, Norman Mailer, A. S. Neill, and William S. Burroughs.
