= Abel's Island (film) =

- Directed by: Michael Sporn
- Written by: William Steig; Maxine Fisher; Michael Sporn
- Based on: Abel's Island by William Steig
- Produced by: Giuliana Nicodemi; Michael Sporn
- Starring: Tim Curry; Lionel Jeffries; Heidi Stallings
- Narrated by: Tim Curry
- Cinematography: Gary Becker; Wolf Ferro
- Edited by: Gregory Perler
- Music by: Arthur Custer
- Distributed by: Random House
- Release date: June 2, 1988
- Running time: 30 minutes
- Countries: Switzerland; United States
- Language: English

Abel's Island is a 1988 Swiss-American short animated film directed by Michael Sporn. It is based on the children's novel Abel's Island by William Steig.

== Cast ==
- Tim Curry as Abel
- Heidi Stallings as Amanda
- Lionel Jeffries as Gower

== Crew ==
- Book - William Steig
- Director/Screenplay/Producer - Michael Sporn
- Screenplay - Maxine Fisher
- Executive producer - Giuliana Nicodemi
- Assistant producer - Kit Hawkins
- Music - Arthur Custer
- Camera - Gary Becker and Wolf Ferro
- Film editing - Gregory Perler
- Art direction - Bridget Thorn
- Assistant director - Robert Marianetti

Rendering artists

- Ray Kosarin
- Sono Kuwayama
- Stephen MacQuignon
- Betsy Bauer
- Laura Bryson
- George McClements
- Christine O'Neill
- Theresa Smythe
- Michael Wisniewski

Animators

- Michael Sporn
- Tissa David
- John R. Dilworth (credited as John Dilworth)
- Steven Dovas
- Doug Compton
- Lisa Crafts

Conductor

- Arthur Custer

Assistant animators

- George McClements
- Ray Kosarin
- Michael Wisniewski

Background artists

- Bridget Thorn

Animatic

- Thomas Repasky

Pencil test

- Daniel Estermen

== Accolades ==
Abel's Island was nominated for an Emmy Award in 1989 for Primetime Emmy Award for Outstanding Animated Program.
