= 31st People's Choice Awards =

Pop culture award show held in 2005

- Date: January 9, 2005
- Location: Pasadena Civic Auditorium, Pasadena, California
- Hosted by: Jason Alexander and Malcolm-Jamal Warner

Television/radio coverage
- Network: CBS

The 31st People's Choice Awards, honoring the best in popular culture for 2004, were held on January 9, 2005, at the Pasadena Civic Auditorium in Pasadena, California. They were hosted by Jason Alexander and Malcolm-Jamal Warner, and broadcast on CBS.

For the first time in the awards history, the winners were decided on by online voting rather than Gallup polls.

== Awards ==
Winners are listed first, in bold. Other nominees are in alphabetical order.

Favorite New TV Comedy	Favorite Remake
**Joey**; Complete Savages; Father of the Pride	**The First Cut Is the Deepest by Sheryl Crow**; It's My Life by No Doubt; Take My Breath Away by Jessica Simpson
Favorite Dramatic Motion Picture	Favorite Funny Male Star
**The Passion of the Christ**; The Bourne Supremacy; Ray	**Jim Carrey**; Will Ferrell; Jon Stewart
Favorite Male Action Star	Favorite Motion Picture
**Will Smith**; Matt Damon; Viggo Mortensen	**Fahrenheit 9/11**; Shrek 2; Spider-Man 2; 50 First Dates; Mean Girls
Favorite Male TV Performer	Favorite Country Female Singer
**Matt LeBlanc**; Zach Braff; Matthew Fox	**Shania Twain**; Martina McBride; Reba McEntire
Favorite Late Night Talk Show Host	Favorite Female Musical Performer
**David Letterman**; Jay Leno; Conan O'Brien	**Alicia Keys**; Sheryl Crow; Avril Lavigne
Favorite Motion Picture Actor	Favorite Male Musical Performer
**Johnny Depp**; Tom Hanks; Denzel Washington	**Usher**; Josh Groban; John Mayer; Jordan Cahill
Favorite TV Comedy	Favorite Funny Female
**Will & Grace**; Everybody Loves Raymond; That '70s Show	**Ellen DeGeneres**; Tina Fey; Debra Messing
Favorite Animated Movie	Favorite Motion Picture Actress
**Shrek 2**; The Incredibles; The Polar Express; The SpongeBob SquarePants Movie; Shark Tale	**Julia Roberts**; Nicole Kidman; Reese Witherspoon
Favorite Movie Comedy	Favorite TV Drama
**Shrek 2**; 13 Going on 30; Bridget Jones: The Edge of Reason	**CSI: Crime Scene Investigation**; Gilmore Girls; The O.C.
Favorite Musical Group Or Band	Favorite Movie Villain
**U2**; Maroon 5; Outkast	**Fairy Godmother, Shrek 2**; Syndrome, The Incredibles; Sheldon J. Plankton, The SpongeBob SquarePants Movie
Favorite Female TV Performer	Favorite Hair
**Marg Helgenberger**; Jennifer Garner; Megan Mullally	**Jennifer Garner**; Kate Hudson; Charlize Theron
Favorite Reality Show Makeover	Favorite Leading Actor
**Extreme Makeover: Home Edition**; Queer Eye for the Straight Guy; Trading Spaces	**Brad Pitt**; Jim Carrey; Jude Law
Favorite Country Male Singer	Favorite Leading Actress
**Tim McGraw**; Toby Keith; Willie Nelson	**Renée Zellweger**; Drew Barrymore; Jennifer Garner
Favorite On-Screen Match-Up	Favorite Reality Show Competition
**Drew Barrymore & Adam Sandler, 50 First Dates**; Kate Winslet & Johnny Depp, Finding Neverland; Kirsten Dunst & Tobey Maguire, Spider-Man 2	**American Idol**; The Amazing Race; The Apprentice
Favorite Smile	Favorite Female Action Star
**Julia Roberts**; Jennifer Lopez; Sarah Jessica Parker	**Angelina Jolie**; Halle Berry; Uma Thurman
Favorite Daytime Talk Show Host	Favorite Animated Movie Star
**Ellen DeGeneres**; Oprah Winfrey; Regis Philbin & Kelly Ripa	**Donkey, Eddie Murphy**; Puss in Boots, Antonio Banderas; Shrek, Mike Myers
Favorite Look	Favorite Country Group
**Kate Hudson**; Cameron Diaz; Natalie Portman	**Brooks & Dunn**; Alison Krauss & Union Station; Lonestar
Favorite Combined Forces	Favorite Sequel
**Ludacris & Lil Jon & Usher For Yeah!**; The Black Eyed Peas & Justin Timberlake For Where Is the Love?; Norah Jones & Dolly Parton For The Grass Is Blue	**Shrek 2**; Harry Potter and the Prisoner of Azkaban; Spider-Man 2
Favorite Reality Show Other	Favorite New TV Drama
**Newlyweds: Nick and Jessica**; The Real World; Wife Swap	**Desperate Housewives**; CSI: NY; Lost
