= Abel's Island =

1976 children's book by William Steig

- 1976 edition cover
- Author: William Steig
- Illustrator: William Steig
- Language: English
- Genre: Children's novel
- Publisher: Farrar, Straus and Giroux
- Publication date: 1976
- Publication place: United States
- Media type: Print (hardback & paperback)
- Pages: 128
- ISBN: 978-0-374-30010-4
- OCLC: 1859788
- LC Class: PZ7.S8177 Ab

Abel's Island is a children's novel written and illustrated by William Steig. It won a Newbery Honor. It was published by Farrar, Straus and Giroux, Toronto, Ontario in 1976. It is a survival story about a mouse stranded on an island.

== Plot summary ==
The story is set in the fictional town of Mossville, which is inhabited by civilized anthropomorphic animals, such as mice, rabbits, toads and so on. As the book begins, Abel, a mouse, is enjoying a picnic with his wife Amanda, but they are interrupted by a fierce rainstorm and are forced to take shelter in a cave nearby. The two are separated when Abel braves the storm to retrieve Amanda's scarf, blown away by a gust of wind. The storm washes Abel into a river and he is swept downstream until he is stranded on an island.

Abel attempts to escape the island several times, but fails, and finally realizes that he must survive on the island by himself. He finds a log and makes it his home in the winter. To ease his loneliness, he creates his family out of clay and talks to them. Poor Abel has to live through the hardest times, including battling an owl and surviving through a harsh winter.

Later in the novel, another stranded victim from the river, a frog named Gower, comes and befriends Abel. Later, he leaves promising that he will send for help when he gets back home. Weeks pass, however, and no one comes. Gower either forgot (due to his lack of memory) or never made it back. Abel then decides to swim against the fierce river after the water level has dropped sufficiently. Abel eventually makes the hard trip back and returns to Mossville and meets his wife.

== Setting ==
Two settings are:

- Mossville, a fictional town inhabited by small, anthropomorphic swamp and forest animals.
- The titular island in front of a waterfall in which Abel estimates to be "12,000 mouse tails long and 5,000 mouse tails wide".

== Themes ==
Some of the major themes in Abel's Island include:

Survival: Although escaping from the island is Abel's first concern, he soon has to worry about finding food and shelter. He also needs to stay on the lookout for predators.

Change: At the start of the story, Abel never has to work. Being stranded on an island in the middle of river forces him to change and expect more from himself.

Love: Abel often thinks about his wife Amanda, and he clings to the hope of seeing her again. His clothes get rumpled and stained, but he takes care of his wife's scarf and guards it until he can return it to her.

== Reception ==
Julia Whedon, writing for The New York Times, called Steig's story "more than rough melodrama". She praised the character's writing, admiring Abel's ability to keep his "cool" while surviving with none of the things he was used to as a gentleman.

== Animated feature ==
In 1988, the novel was made into a 30-minute animated film of the same name, directed by Michael Sporn. Abel was voiced by Tim Curry and Gower was voiced by Lionel Jeffries. In 1989, the film won an Emmy Award for "Most Outstanding Animated Film under an hour".
