= Pete's a Pizza =

1998 children's book by William Steig

Pete's a Pizza is a 1998 children's book by author-illustrator William Steig, released by Harper Collins. It tells of a boy who is in a bad mood, but is then turned into a pizza by his father.

== Reception ==
Kirkus Book Reviews wrote: "What leaps from the page, with a dancer’s grace, is the warmth and imagination wrapped in an act of kindness and tuned-in parenting. As always, Steig’s illustrations are a natural—an organic—part of the story, whether Pete’s a pizza, or not." Publishers Weekly commented that the story was simple, and concluded that "amiable quality of Steig's easy pizza recipe will amuse chef and entree alike". Similarly, Common Sense Media called the story simple, and stated that the artwork was a "light wash of watercolor", complimenting the illustration of the characters' faces.
