= The Amazing Bone =

1977 book by William Steig

- Front cover of The Amazing Bone
- Author: William Steig
- Publisher: Farrar, Straus and Giroux
- Publication date: September 1, 1976
- Media type: Print (paperback)
- Pages: 32
- Awards: Caldecott Honor
- OCLC: 973578476

The Amazing Bone is a 32-page children's picture book by William Steig from 1976. It was the first of Steig's few books in which the main character is a female.

The book received the Caldecott Honor Award (1977) and was nominated for the Boston Globe–Horn Book Award for Picture Book (1977).

== Plot ==
The Amazing Bone is about how Pearl the pig is walking home from school, and finds a magic talking bone on the ground, which has the ability to imitate any sound and speak in any language (it samples Spanish, Polish and German for her). Pearl takes it with her, and on the way home they have several misadventures, including an encounter with a hungry fox who wants to eat Pearl for dinner.

The book was featured in an episode of the PBS television show Storytime in which it was read to a live audience.

== Reception ==
The Amazing Bone received the following accolades:

- Caldecott Honor Award (1977)
- Boston Globe-Horn Book Award Nominee for Picture Book (1977)
- New York Times Book Review Notable Children's Book of the Year (1976)
- New York Times Outstanding Book of the Year (1976)

== Adaptation ==
In 1985, an animated short film was made of this book, with John Lithgow as the narrator, and produced by Weston Woods Studios. Lithgow also gave his voice for another film adaptation of a William Steig book, Shrek.

A children's musical was produced at Lifeline Theatre in Chicago, Illinois in 1996. This adaptation, by Eric Lane Barnes, was also produced at the Morgan-Wixson Theatre in Santa Monica, California in 2010.
