= Sylvester and the Magic Pebble =

1969 picture book by William Steig

- Front cover of Sylvester and the Magic Pebble
- Author: William Steig
- Illustrator: William Steig
- Cover artist: William Steig
- Genre: Children's book
- Publisher: Windmill Books/Simon & Schuster
- Publication date: September 24, 1969
- Publication place: United States
- ISBN: 0-671-66269-4
- OCLC: 6087743

Sylvester and the Magic Pebble is a children's picture book written and illustrated by William Steig, and published in 1969. It won the Caldecott Medal in 1970.

== Plot ==
Sylvester Duncan, a young donkey from the fictional community of Oatsdale, collects pebbles "of unusual shape and color". One day he finds a spherical red pebble that grants wishes. Immediately afterward, a lion scares Sylvester, and as a defense he wishes himself into a rock, the only thing he could think of at the moment. The magic pebble falls off the rock, however, and Sylvester is unable to revert to his donkey form as the pebble must be in contact with the wish-maker to work. The rest of the story deals with the resulting aftermath: Sylvester's personal attempt to change back into his true self and Mr. and Mrs. Duncan's search for their only child.

== Awards ==
Sylvester and the Magic Pebble earned Steig the 1970 Caldecott Medal, his first of many Caldecott and Newbery Medal honors. The book was nominated for the 1970 National Book Award for Young People's Literature (losing out to Isaac Bashevis Singer's A Day of Pleasure). In 1978, Sylvester and the Magic Pebble was given the Lewis Carroll Shelf Award.

== In popular culture ==
In 1993, Weston Woods Studios adapted the book into an animated short film. The film was narrated by John Lithgow and featured music by Steig's son, Jeremy Steig. Coincidentally, Lithgow would later voice Lord Farquaad in DreamWorks Animation's feature film adaptation of Shrek!, another one of Steig's books.

The book was also featured on an episode of Between the Lions.

The story is used as an example by Noam Chomsky in the documentary film Is the Man Who Is Tall Happy? by Michel Gondry.

The story is also briefly referenced in "When the World Tips Over" by Jandy Nelson.

In the FX series The Bear (Season 4, Episode 6), "Cousin" Richie alludes to the story while attempting to describe his feeling "isolated" and "far away".

== Controversy ==
The book allegedly sparked some controversy, for its portrayal of the police as pigs, and, as a result was not stocked by public schools and libraries in parts of the United States.

Awards
Preceded by The Fool of the World and the Flying Ship	Caldecott Medal recipient 1970	Succeeded by A Story, a Story
