= CDC? =

1984 children's book by William Steig

- Book cover
- Author: William Steig
- Illustrator: William Steig
- Cover artist: William Steig
- Language: English
- Genre: Children's book
- Publisher: Farrar, Straus and Giroux
- Publication date: 1984
- Publication place: United States
- Media type: Print
- Preceded by: CDB!

CDC? is a children's puzzle book written and illustrated by author and cartoonist William Steig. Originally published in 1984, it is a sequel to his 1968 picture book CDB! and is of the same concept: letters and numbers that suggest the sounds of words or phrases are printed as captions for interpretive cartoons. The reader guesses what the letters and numbers are supposed to represent in actual words: the book's title, for example, represents the question "See the sea?"

== About the book ==
The book is somewhat more sophisticated in content than CDB!, using more complicated phrases. According to Steig's obituary in The New York Times, even some adults found the captions challenging.

The book, in its 1984 release, was originally printed in black-and-white and was republished and re-released with pen-and-ink watercolor-style pictures and an answer key at the end. To figure out the word puzzles, the reader needs to read the letters, numbers, and symbols aloud, pronouncing their names, not sounding them out. The picture accompanying each puzzle helps give the reader hints about the coded phrase.
