= José Aruego =

Filipino children's book author/illustrator

- Born: August 9, 1932; Manila, Philippine Islands
- Died: August 9, 2012 (aged 80); New York City, U.S.
- Occupation(s): Author, illustrator
- Spouse: Ariane Dewey

José Aruego (August 9, 1932 – August 9, 2012) was a Filipino children's book author and illustrator. He was born in Manila and once worked as a lawyer. He died in New York City, where he lived for decades, on August 9, 2012.

== Early career ==
Aruego graduated from law school at the University of the Philippines and passed the bar. He came to New York City in 1956 and studied at Parsons School of Design. He started to pen cartoons and this was when his career took off. Many of his cartoons were published in The New Yorker and The Saturday Evening Post.

== Books ==
Aruego wrote 82 children's books. He lectured extensively at elementary schools, insisting on sketching a character into every book that he signed and teaching students to draw his alligators. Among his best known books were Whose Mouse Are You?, Leo the Late Bloomer and Gregory the Terrible Eater. He worked alongside his wife Ariane Dewey in creating books that were about animals. Their first book was published in 1969. In 2006, they reunited to produce The Last Laugh, a picture book that had a strong anti-bullying message.
