= Shrek! =

1990 picture book by William Steig

- First edition cover, designed by William Steig
- Author: William Steig
- Illustrator: William Steig
- Cover artist: William Steig
- Language: English
- Genre: Children's literature, fairy tale parody
- Publisher: Farrar, Straus and Giroux
- Publication date: October 17, 1990
- Publication place: United States
- Media type: Print (paperback and hardcover)
- Pages: 30
- ISBN: 978-0-374-36877-7
- OCLC: 22497777
- LC Class: PZ7.S8177 Sh 1990

Shrek! is a children's picture book published in 1990. Written and illustrated by American writer and cartoonist William Steig, it is about a repugnant monster who leaves home to see the world and ends up marrying an ugly princess. The book was generally well-received upon publication, with critics praising the illustrations, originality, and writing. Critics have also described Shrek as an antihero and noted the book's themes of satisfaction and self-esteem. The book served as the basis for the 2001 DreamWorks Animation film Shrek, which subsequently became a multimedia franchise.

== Plot ==
His mother was ugly and his father was ugly, but Shrek was uglier than the two of them put together. By the time he toddled, Shrek could spit flame a full ninety-nine yards and vent smoke from either ear. With just a look, he cowed the reptiles in the swamp. Any snake dumb enough to bite him instantly got convulsions and died.

— Steig's description of Shrek

Shrek is a green-skinned, fire-breathing, seemingly indestructible monster who enjoys causing misery with his repulsive appearance and anti-social behavior. After his parents decide that he must be sent out into the world to "[do] his share of damage", they (literally) kick him out of their home in a swamp. Shrek soon encounters a witch, who, in exchange for his rare lice, reads his fortune: by uttering the magic words "Apple Strudel", he will be taken by a donkey to a castle, where he will battle a knight and marry a princess who is even uglier than him.

Excitedly on his way, Shrek encounters a scything peasant from whom he steals and eats his pheasant, counters an attack from thunder, lightning and rain by eating lightning's fiercest bolt, and knocks out a dragon with his fiery breath. While resting, he is disturbed by a nightmare in which he is helplessly hugged and kissed by a multitude of children. Awakening, he meets the donkey, who takes him to the castle.

Shrek confronts the knight guarding the castle; outraged by Shrek's demands to see the princess, the knight attacks him, to which Shrek responds with a fire blast that sends him into the surrounding moat. Inside the castle, Shrek is terrified when he appears to be surrounded by an army of hideous creatures, but regains his resolve and self-esteem upon discovering that he is merely in a hall of mirrors. He finally meets the princess; mutually smitten by their shared ugliness, they marry and live "horribly ever after, scaring the socks off all who fell afoul of them".

== Publication history ==
William Steig was a cartoonist at The New Yorker from 1930 to the 1960s. He created over 1,600 cartoons and was dubbed "The King of Cartoons". However, he intensely disliked creating advertisements, and started writing children's books instead at the age of sixty-one. Steig was in his eighties when he wrote Shrek!.

His books became known for "graphically repeated themes of stark separation and warm reunion" between parents and their children while maintaining the "wit" that was characteristic of his cartoons. The books also commonly included themes such as separation and transformation. Steig's artwork in his children's books was noted for "rich" use of colors and were made using watercolor painting and ink. They were compared to his cartoons that had been published in The New Yorker.

The name "Shrek" is a romanization of the Yiddish word שרעק (shrek), or שרעקלעך (shreklekh), related to the German Schreck and meaning "fear" or "fright". Shrek! was published by Farrar, Straus and Giroux.

== Reception ==
The journalist David Denby wrote that "For all its acrid temper, Shrek! was very much a charmed fairy tale: the perfectly ugly creature finds his perfectly ugly mate." Publishers Weekly gave the book a positive review, praising Steig's "epigrammatic genius" and calling the book an "engrossing and satisfying tale". A reviewer for The New York Times highlighted the illustrations and Steig's "perfect-pitch ear for daffy English idiom". Karen Litton in School Library Journal similarly praised the book's illustrations and writing, noting that it was a good book to read aloud.

Michael Dirda for The Washington Post considered the writing and pictures to be "relatively simple", but "such an ingratiating, cheery book that no one will be able to resist it". He did not consider it Steig's best work, but instead a "perfect" modest achievement. A reviewer for Language Arts noted the book's originality, saying that it turned the standards of folk literature "upside down". Other reviewers also highlighted the book's originality. Shrek! also was named among the picture book winners of the 1990 Children's Book Award given by Parents' Choice. Publishers Weekly gave the book several of the 1990 "Cuffies", a children's book award, including "funniest book of the year" and "best opening line".

Some parents objected to the book, feeling that it was unsuitable for children. The scholar Jack Zipes felt that Shrek! was not Steig's best work. Professor Victoria Ford Smith in 2017 considered Steig's artwork "childlike", comparing it to the work of Quentin Blake, who illustrated books for the well-known Roald Dahl.

== Analysis ==
In 2010, Zipes wrote in Tor.com that the book was one of the "best examples of how the fairy tale has been fractured and continually transformed, indicating its radical potential in our digital age, especially with the production and success of the twenty-first century digitally animated films". Zipes noted that the book and its hero ask the question "What is evil? Who causes evil?". He considered Shrek! a parody of "The Story of the Youth Who Went Forth to Learn What Fear Was", a story by the Brothers Grimm, but also considered the book to represent "the outsider, the marginalized, the Other, who could be any of the oppressed minorities in America."

In 2019, Rumaan Alam in The New Yorker highlighted the book as a story where "the bad guy gets a happy ending" and noted that "sometimes life works that way." The author and critic Lee Thomas compared Shrek! to Steig's 1984 Rotten Island as instances where the "devil really slithers into his ghoulish own". Shrek! has been described as having themes of "satisfaction and self-esteem" and being true to yourself.

=== Shrek ===
Steig's Shrek has been described as an antihero who represents someone who is different and is happy with it. When his parents kick Shrek out of his swamp, he is forced to embark on a trip to resolve issues over his subjectivity. According to the professor Lewis Roberts, Shrek experiences several "moments of crisis" in the book, first when he has a nightmare about children and later when he enters the hall of mirrors. The professor Lewis Roberts considers these moments comparable to the Lacanian mirror stage, a psychoanalytic concept relating to the moment when an infant first becomes aware of themselves. Shrek easily beats the dragon because the dragon reminds him of the part of himself he is comfortable with: his ugliness.

Shrek's nightmare is more difficult for Shrek. By presenting it as a two-page spread, which is uncommon in the book, Steig highlights it as an important moment. Because the children are paying Shrek attention and are not repulsed or afraid of him, his "self-image is threatened and his relationship to the Other is destabilized". He has to confront the fact that "his ideal of the horrible is unreachable". Shrek's arrival in the hall of mirrors represents him "coming to terms with his own reflection" and learning to be "happier than ever to be exactly what he was". However, the images he sees in the mirror still do not match what he looks like and represent an ideal rather than reality.

After the two crises, Shrek is not completed until he meets the princess, who is uglier than him. Roberts concludes by saying that "The book rehearses the crises of subjectivity all children must face, and then reassures and amuses its readers by showing how even a hideous figure such as Shrek can find resolution."

== Adaptations ==
Steven Spielberg purchased the rights for the book in 1991, planning to produce a traditionally animated film based on the book (which would have been in 2D animation, and was going to star Bill Murray as Shrek and Steve Martin as Donkey). However, DreamWorks ended up purchasing the rights for the book for approximately $500,000 and putting it in active development in November 1995. Shrek was released on May 18, 2001, in CGI, starring the voices of Mike Myers, Eddie Murphy, Cameron Diaz, and John Lithgow. The film was a critical and commercial success and won the first ever Academy Award for Best Animated Feature. It was followed by several other films, including: Shrek 2 (2004), Shrek the Third (2007), Shrek Forever After (2010), and the upcoming Shrek 5 (2027). The first film was adapted into a Broadway musical in 2008.

Several critics highlighted differences between the Shrek film and Steig's original version, including the addition of characters and changing the plot and morals. However, Steig said that he liked the movie and it dramatically increased sales of his book. Steig said of the film: "It's vulgar, it's disgusting—and I love it!"
