= William Steig =

American illustrator and writer (1907–2003)

- Born: November 14, 1907; New York City, U.S
- Died: October 3, 2003 (aged 95); Boston, Massachusetts, U.S
- Occupations: Illustrator, writer
- Spouses: Elizabeth Mead Steig (m. 1936; div. 1949) Kari Homestead (m. 1950; div. 1963) Stephanie Healey (m. 1964–1966) Jeanne Doron (m. 1968)
- Children: 3, including Jeremy Steig
- Writing career
- Period: 1930–2003
- Notable works: Sylvester and the Magic Pebble; Doctor De Soto; Shrek!
- Notable awards: Caldecott Medal; 1970; National Book Award; 1983; CINE Golden Eagle; 1984

William Steig (/staɪɡ/ STYGHE; November 14, 1907 – October 3, 2003) was an American cartoonist, illustrator, and children's book author best known for his picture book Shrek!, which inspired the film series of the same name. Steig was a prolific contributor of both cartoons and cover illustrations for The New Yorker magazine, and he developed a style of less humorous line drawings that became common on greeting cards as well as in his several published collections.

Steig began writing children's books at age 61, and went on to publish more than 30 other than Shrek!, including Sylvester and the Magic Pebble, Abel's Island, CDC?, and Doctor De Soto. Steig was the U.S. nominee for the biennial and international Hans Christian Andersen Awards, as both a children's book illustrator in 1982 and a writer in 1988.

== Early life and education ==
Steig was born in Brooklyn, New York, in 1907, and grew up in the Bronx. His parents were Polish-Jewish immigrants from Lemberg, Austria-Hungary, and were both socialists. His father, Joseph Steig, was a house painter, and his mother, Laura Ebel Steig, was a seamstress who encouraged his artistic leanings. "My parents didn't want their sons to become laborers, because we'd be exploited by businessmen, and they didn't want us to become businessmen, because then we'd exploit the laborers", Steig later said. "Since we couldn't afford to study professions, we were encouraged to be artists."

As a child, Steig dabbled in painting and was fascinated by literature, especially Pinocchio. He was an avid athlete, participating in touch football, swimming, and a collegiate All-American water polo team. At age 15, Steig graduated from Townsend Harris Hall Prep School. He was uninterested in schoolwork and never completed college despite attending three institutions, spending two years at City College of New York, three years at the National Academy of Design, and a mere five days at the Yale School of Art before dropping out of each one.

== Cartoons and drawings ==
=== New Yorker cartoons ===
Steig began selling his illustrations and cartoons to magazines to support his family during the Great Depression, and quickly became the breadwinner as his father was unemployed. After publishing his first work in The New Yorker in 1930, his work became a staple of the magazine. His comic series called "Small Fry" featured scrappy young characters on the street, inspired by Steig's youth in the Bronx. Steig earned $4,500 in his first year, more than what his family needed. New Yorker cartoon editor Lee Lorenz went on to write a biography of Steig, and said that unlike prominent cartoonists Peter Arno and George Price, he created humor that was visual first and verbal second.

Steig was hailed as the "King of Cartoons", and went on to contribute more than 2,600 drawings and 117 covers to The New Yorker. In 1944 he published his first book of cartoons, Small Fry. His cartoon characters "Poor Pitiful Pearl" was made into a popular line of dolls starting in 1956.

"If I'd had it my way, I'd have been a professional athlete, a sailor, a beachcomber or some other form of hobo. A painter, a gardener, a novelist, a banjo player, a traveler, anything but a rich man."

— William Steig to Publishers Weekly, 1987

=== Symbolic drawings ===
In 1936, Steig moved away from traditional cartoons and began to create more emotionally honest "symbolic drawings", line drawings of complex or distressed characters, such as curmudgeonly hermits and kleptomaniacs. The style became a popular feature of items like napkins and stationary, and caused a shift in the greeting card industry toward realistic sentiments instead of sweet uplifting messages. Steig published multiple books of symbolic drawings starting with About People (1939), of which he later said, "It was supposed to help improve the human condition". Following the release of The Lonely Ones (1942), Steig became a "cult celebrity" and was praised by E. E. cummings as one of the few Americans he respected. W. H. Auden compared Steig's drawings to The Disasters of War by Francisco Goya. Steig published a third collection, All Embarrassed (1944). During Steig's second and third marriages, each of which lasted less than three years, he published The Rejected Lovers (1951) about romantic love.

The New Yorker did not publish the symbolic drawings until William Shawn became editor in 1952, because previous editor Harold Ross had considered them "too personal and not funny enough" for The New Yorker, though he praised them as evidence of Steig's brilliance.

For a 1934 auction organized by Langston Hughes to benefit the defense fund for the Scottsboro Boys — nine African Americans who had been falsely accused of rape and denied fair trials — he contributed an untitled original drawing and a reprint of another.

== Children's books ==
Steig began writing children's books when he was 61 after being convinced to try it by fellow New Yorker cartoonist Robert Kraus, who had recently started an imprint called "Windmill Books" under Harper & Row in 1967. In 1968, Steig had the idea for the book CDB! (1968), written entirely in capital letters that were read as words ("see the bee"). He published the children's book Roland the Minstrel Pig in 1968. His third book, Sylvester and the Magic Pebble (1969), won the Caldecott Medal. Because the book portrayed police officers as incompetent pigs, the International Conference of Police Associations complained that the characterization was offensive and had the book banned from certain places in 1970.

Steig went on to write into his nineties and publish more than 30 children's books.

In the 1970s, Steig began to publish children's novels with the editor Michael di Capua at Farrar, Straus, and Giroux, including Dominic (1972), The Amazing Bone (1977), and Abel's Island (1976). He continued to also write picture books, including Brave Irene (1986), a CDB! sequel called CDC? (1984), and Doctor De Soto (1982). Maurice Sendak praised Steig's "use of crazy, complicated language is what's so charming, because kids love the sound of words." In Doctor De Soto, after a mouse dentist fixes a fox patient's teeth together to protect himself from being eaten, the fox attempts to thank the dentist after the visit by saying, "frank oo berry mush." In 1984, Steig's film adaptation of Doctor De Soto, directed by Michael Sporn, was nominated for the Academy Award for Best Animated Short Film. Steig received the 1984 CINE Golden Eagle Award in Education for the film adaptation of this book. He collaborated with his wife, Jeanne Steig, on several books including Consider the Lemming (1988) and Alpha Beta Chowder (1992).

=== Shrek ===
Steig published his best known children's story Shrek! (1990) at age 83. He said he earned $500,000 from DreamWorks Animation for movie rights to the book, which was adapted into the animated film Shrek (2001). Steig attended a screening of the film, and offered the following review: "It's vulgar, it's disgusting — and I loved it." After the release of Shrek 2 in 2004, Steig became the first sole-creator of an animated movie franchise that went on to generate over $1 billion from theatrical and ancillary markets after only one sequel.

== Reception and influences ==
=== Artistic influences ===
Steig credited Pablo Picasso as his primary inspiration. He said he once ended a longterm friendship due to disagreements about Picasso's merits. He cited Pinocchio as a particularly fascinating story to him during childhood, and his stories have been compared to it. As a child, Steig read and watched extensively, and among his other influences are the books Robinson Crusoe and Robin Hood, films by Charlie Chaplin, the comic strip The Katzenjammer Kids, and Engelbert and Hunperdinck's Hansel and Gretel opera. Additional artists that Steig has praised include Stuart Davis, Albert Ryder, and Chuck Close.

"In a softball game between artists and writers, I'd bet on the artists." – William Steig, 1987

Steig was highly interested in the work of the pseudoscientist Wilhelm Reich, whom Steig credited with saving his life. He did 40 therapy sessions with Reich, and spent time every day in a contraption that he believed was altering levels of orgone. In the 1950s, Steig illustrated Reich's book Listen, Little Man!, and dedicated his own book Agony in the Kindergarten, about parental repression of children, to Reich. Sarah Boxer wrote in Steig's The New York Times obituary that Reich provided Steig with "a confirmation of his belief that people should be emancipated from the inhibitions that society and government impose on children and adults."

=== Reception ===
James Geraghty, New Yorker art editor from 1939 to 1973, told Steig in a note, "Recently I have had the occasion to examine thousands of cartoons that have appeared in The New Yorker. One of the impressions remaining to me from this ordeal is the conviction that it would probably not be too extravagant to surmise that in all the history of graphic expressiveness your genius is unsurpassed: for sensitivity and comic perception of the human plight; for loveliness of line, for constant renewal, constant freshness. (The phrase 'graphic expressiveness' is too limiting, but I can't think of another at the moment.) My best, Jim."

== Personal life ==
=== Family ===
Steig married four times and had three children. From 1936 to 1949, Steig was married to educator and artist Elizabeth Mead Steig (1909–83, sister of anthropologist Margaret Mead), from whom he was later divorced. For a time, Steig lived at 75½ Bedford Street, purported to be the narrowest house in Manhattan. Steig's first marriage also made him a brother-in-law of Leo Rosten and an uncle of Mary Catherine Bateson. Steig and Mead were the parents of jazz flutist Jeremy Steig (playing the Pied Piper in Shrek Forever After) and a daughter, Lucinda. He married his second wife, Kari Homestead, in 1950, and they had a daughter, Margit Laura (now professionally known as Maggie Steig). After their divorce, he was married to Stephanie Healey from 1964 to 1966. His final marriage, to Jeanne Doron in 1968, endured for the rest of his life. In 1972, the couple moved from New York City to rural Connecticut. In 1992, they moved from Kent, Connecticut, to Back Bay, Boston.

Steig's brother, Irwin, was a journalist and painter, for whom William illustrated two books on poker strategy. His brother, Henry, was a jeweler and a writer who played the saxophone and painted. And his brother Arthur was a writer and poet, who, according to Steig, read The Nation in the cradle, was telepathic and "drew as well as Picasso or Matisse".

=== Lifestyle and death ===
Steig typically drew every day, and was unsentimental about much of his work, calling his field "a dying art form". Steig once told Roger Angell that he desired more freedom and had "always felt that family was a nuisance" though he and his characters always returned to them. Steig described himself as childlike in certain ways, and said, "I think I feel a little differently than other people do. For some reason I've never felt grown up."

Steig died of natural causes in Boston, Massachusetts, on October 3, 2003, at the age of 95. Shrek 2, which was released seven months after his death, was dedicated to his memory.

"[Children are] the best company there is. In a family gathering, when they send the kids to bed, that's when the party ends for me. I guess it's just my respect for kids that makes me talk sensibly to them."
– William Steig, 2001 (USA Today)

== Works ==
- 1932, Man About Town (New York: R. Long & R.R. Smith)
- 1939, About People: A book of symbolical drawings by William Steig (Random House)
- 1941, How to Become Extinct (Farrar & Rinehart), written by Will Cuppy, illustrated by Steig
- 1942, The Lonely Ones (Duell, Sloan and Pearce)
- 1944, All Embarrassed (Duell S&P)
- 1944, Small Fry (Duell S&P)
- 1945, Persistent Faces (Duell S&P)
- 1946, Mr. Blandings Builds His Dream House (Simon & Schuster) by Eric Hodgins
- 1947, Till Death Do Us Part: Some ballet notes on marriage (Duell S&P)
- 1948, Listen, Little Man! (Orgone Institute Press) by Wilhelm Reich – translated from the German-language essay "Rede an den kleinen Mann", 1945
- 1950, The Decline and Fall of Practically Everybody by Will Cuppy
- 1950, The Agony in the Kindergarten (Duell S&P)
- 1950, Giggle Box: Funny Stories for Boys and Girls (Alfred A. Knopf), compiled by Phyllis R. Fenner, newly illustrated by Steig
- 1951, The Rejected Lovers (Knopf)
- 1953, Dreams of Glory and other drawings (Knopf)
- 1959, Poker for Fun and Profit (McDowell, Obolensky, 1959), written by Irwin Steig, illustrated by William Steig
- 1963, Common Sense in Poker (Cornerstone, 1963), written by Irwin Steig, illustrated by William Steig
- 1963, Continuous Performance (Duell S&P)

From this time, Steig primarily created children's picture books.

- 1968 (April), Roland the Minstrel Pig (Windmill)
- 1968 (September), CDB! (Windmill Books) – picture book
- 1969, Sylvester and the Magic Pebble (Windmill) – NBA finalist
- 1969, The Bad Island (Windmill); reissued as Rotten Island (D. R. Godine, 1984)
- 1971, Amos and Boris
- 1972, Dominic – NBA finalist
- 1973, The Real Thief
- 1974, Farmer Palmer's Wagon Ride
- 1976, Abel's Island – adapted as a 1988 film
- 1976, The Amazing Bone
- 1977, Caleb + Kate – NBA finalist
- 1978, Tiffky Doofky
- 1979, Drawings
- 1980, Gorky Rises
- 1982, Doctor De Soto – National Book Award, Picture Books
- 1984, CDC? (Farrar, Straus & Giroux)
- 1984, Ruminations
- 1984, Yellow & Pink
- 1984, Rotten Island (formerly The Bad Island, 1969)
- 1985, Solomon, The Rusty Nail
- 1986, Brave Irene
- 1987, The Zabajaba Jungle
- 1988, Spinky Sulks
- 1990, Shrek! – the basis for the movie series
- 1992, "Strutters & Fretters"
- 1992, Alpha Beta Chowder, written by Jeanne Steig, illustrated by William Steig
- 1992, Doctor De Soto Goes to Africa
- 1994, Zeke Pippin
- 1996, The Toy Brother
- 1998, A Handful of Beans: Six Fairy Tales, retold by Jeanne Steig, illustrated by William Steig
- 1998, Pete's a Pizza
- 2000, Made for Each Other
- 2000, Wizzil
- 2001, A Gift from Zeus
- 2002, Potch & Polly
- 2003, When Everybody Wore a Hat
