= Mr. Blandings Builds His Dream House (novel) =

Book by Eric Hodgins

- First edition
- Author: Eric Hodgins
- Language: English
- Genre: Comedy novel
- Publisher: Simon & Schuster
- Publication date: 1946
- Publication place: United States
- Media type: Print (hardback & paperback)
- Pages: 237 pp (hardback edition)
- Followed by: Blandings' Way

Mr. Blandings Builds His Dream House is a 1946 comedy novel written by Eric Hodgins and illustrated by William Steig, describing the vicissitudes of buying a home in the country. It originally appeared as a short story called "Mr. Blandings Builds His Castle" in the April 1946 issue of Fortune magazine.

Within two years the novel had sold 540,000 copies. The screen rights were sold for $200,000. It was adapted as a film of the same name, released in 1948, which starred Cary Grant, Myrna Loy, and Melvyn Douglas. Later three radio adaptations were also performed, with Grant in the leading role, followed by a weekly radio series, also starring Grant.

== Plot summary ==
The book begins in fictional Landsdale County, Connecticut, where Jim and Muriel Blandings are being shown an old farmhouse by a real estate agent. Blandings, a successful New York advertising executive, and his wife want to leave their tiny Midtown apartment, where they live with their two daughters. They fantasize that the farmhouse will meet their needs. After some negotiation, they buy the house.

They soon learn that the house is structurally unsound and must be torn down. They design the perfect home in the country, imagining an idyll, but they are quickly beset by construction troubles, temperamental workmen, skyrocketing bills, threatening lawyers, and difficult neighbors. The Blandings' dream house soon threatens to be the nightmare that undoes them.

Hodgins wrote a sequel, Blandings' Way, published in 1950.

== The real house ==
The short story and novel were based on the author Eric Hodgins's experience with buying property and building a house in the Merryall area of the town of New Milford, Connecticut. The real house was completed in 1939, but was so expensive – his original budget was $11,000 but the final cost was about $56,000 – that Hodgins was forced to sell it. It was sold in 1945 for $38,000 to John Allard, a retired Air Force general. Hodgins unsuccessfully tried to buy the house back after receiving $200,000 in film rights to the book. In 1953, the house was sold to Ralph Gulliver, a fuel oil dealer in New Milford, who gave it to his son, Jack, in 1972. In 1980, the house was sold to the author and composer Stephen Citron and his wife, the biographer and novelist Anne Edwards. In 2004, the house was sold for $1.2 million.

For nearly 20 years, Stewart and Harriet Bonnell lived next door to Blandings Way, on a parcel that was part of the original 31.5-acre Hodgins purchase. Over the years, portions of Blandings Way were sold off. The Bonnells have attempted to reassemble the property. When the main house came up for sale, they bought it, residing circa February 2010.

Unlike in the book and the film, Hodgins did not tear down the old farmhouse, but built the new house next to it. The farmhouse remained until at least the 1970s.

Author and Fortune coworker Robert Cantwell was rumored to have been the inspiration for many of the scenes in the novel. Cantwell had encouraged Hodgins to purchase a property not far from his own house in Sherman, Connecticut, and Cantwell's two daughters had the same names as the two daughters in the novel: Betsy and Joan.

== Characters ==
- Mr. James Blandings - advertising executive
- Mrs. Muriel Blandings - his wife
- Mr. William "Bill" Cole - the Blandings' lawyer and friend

== Adaptations ==
- Mr. Blandings Builds His Dream House (1948), film directed by H. C. Potter
- Mr. Blandings Builds His Dream House (1949-1950), radio play starring Cary Grant, on NBC's Screen Directors Playhouse and on CBS's Lux Radio Theatre (1949)
- Mr. and Mrs. Blandings (1951), weekly comedy radio series starring Cary Grant and Betsy Drake, on NBC.
- The Money Pit (1986), film directed by Richard Benjamin
- Drömkåken (1993), film directed by Peter Dalle
- Are We Done Yet? (2007), film directed by Steve Carr
