= List of The New York Times number-one books of 1978 =

The American daily newspaper The New York Times publishes multiple weekly lists ranking the best-selling books in the United States.

== Fiction ==
The following list ranks the number-one best-selling fiction books, in the hardcover fiction category.

Date	Book	Author
January 1	The Silmarillion	J. R. R. Tolkien
January 8	The Silmarillion	J. R. R. Tolkien
January 15	The Silmarillion	J. R. R. Tolkien
January 22	The Silmarillion	J. R. R. Tolkien
January 29	The Silmarillion	J. R. R. Tolkien
February 5	The Silmarillion	J. R. R. Tolkien
February 12	The Silmarillion	J. R. R. Tolkien
February 19	The Silmarillion	J. R. R. Tolkien
February 26	The Silmarillion	J. R. R. Tolkien
March 5	The Silmarillion	J. R. R. Tolkien
March 12	Bloodline	Sidney Sheldon
March 19	Bloodline	Sidney Sheldon
March 26	Bloodline	Sidney Sheldon
April 2	Bloodline	Sidney Sheldon
April 9	Bloodline	Sidney Sheldon
April 16	Bloodline	Sidney Sheldon
April 23	Bloodline	Sidney Sheldon
April 30	Bloodline	Sidney Sheldon
May 7	Bloodline	Sidney Sheldon
May 14	Bloodline	Sidney Sheldon
May 21	Bloodline	Sidney Sheldon
May 28	Bloodline	Sidney Sheldon
June 4	The Thorn Birds	Colleen McCullough
June 11	Bloodline	Sidney Sheldon
June 18	Scruples	Judith Krantz
June 25	Scruples	Judith Krantz
July 2	Scruples	Judith Krantz
July 9	The Holcroft Covenant	Robert Ludlum
July 16	Scruples	Judith Krantz
July 23	Chesapeake	James Michener
July 30	Chesapeake	James Michener
August 6	Chesapeake	James Michener
August 13	Not published due to a newspaper strike	
August 20	Not published due to a newspaper strike	
August 27	Not published due to a newspaper strike	
September 3	Not published due to a newspaper strike	
September 10	Not published due to a newspaper strike	
September 17	Not published due to a newspaper strike	
September 24	Not published due to a newspaper strike	
October 1	Not published due to a newspaper strike	
October 8	Not published due to a newspaper strike	
October 15	Not published due to a newspaper strike	
October 22	Not published due to a newspaper strike	
October 29	Not published due to a newspaper strike	
November 5	Not published due to a newspaper strike	
November 12	War and Remembrance	Herman Wouk
November 19	War and Remembrance	Herman Wouk
November 26	War and Remembrance	Herman Wouk
December 3	War and Remembrance	Herman Wouk
December 10	War and Remembrance	Herman Wouk
December 17	War and Remembrance	Herman Wouk
December 24	Chesapeake	James Michener
December 31	Chesapeake	James Michener

== Nonfiction ==
The following list ranks the number-one best-selling nonfiction books, in the hardcover nonfiction category.

Date	Book	Author
January 1	All Things Wise and Wonderful	James Herriot
January 8	All Things Wise and Wonderful	James Herriot
January 15	All Things Wise and Wonderful	James Herriot
January 22	All Things Wise and Wonderful	James Herriot
January 29	All Things Wise and Wonderful	James Herriot
February 5	All Things Wise and Wonderful	James Herriot
February 12	All Things Wise and Wonderful	James Herriot
February 19	All Things Wise and Wonderful	James Herriot
February 26	The Complete Book of Running	James F. Fixx
March 5	The Complete Book of Running	James F. Fixx
March 12	The Complete Book of Running	James F. Fixx
March 19	The Ends of Power	H. R. Haldeman with Joseph DiMona
March 26	The Ends of Power	H. R. Haldeman with Joseph DiMona
April 2	The Complete Book of Running	James F. Fixx
April 9	The Complete Book of Running	James F. Fixx
April 16	The Complete Book of Running	James F. Fixx
April 23	The Complete Book of Running	James F. Fixx
April 30	The Complete Book of Running	James F. Fixx
May 7	The Complete Book of Running	James F. Fixx
May 14	The Complete Book of Running	James F. Fixx
May 21	The Complete Book of Running	James F. Fixx
May 28	If Life is a Bowl of Cherries, What Am I Doing in the Pits?	Erma Bombeck
June 4	If Life is a Bowl of Cherries, What Am I Doing in the Pits?	Erma Bombeck
June 11	If Life is a Bowl of Cherries, What Am I Doing in the Pits?	Erma Bombeck
June 18	If Life is a Bowl of Cherries, What Am I Doing in the Pits?	Erma Bombeck
June 25	If Life is a Bowl of Cherries, What Am I Doing in the Pits?	Erma Bombeck
July 2	If Life is a Bowl of Cherries, What Am I Doing in the Pits?	Erma Bombeck
July 9	If Life is a Bowl of Cherries, What Am I Doing in the Pits?	Erma Bombeck
July 16	If Life is a Bowl of Cherries, What Am I Doing in the Pits?	Erma Bombeck
July 23	If Life is a Bowl of Cherries, What Am I Doing in the Pits?	Erma Bombeck
July 30	If Life is a Bowl of Cherries, What Am I Doing in the Pits?	Erma Bombeck
August 6	If Life is a Bowl of Cherries, What Am I Doing in the Pits?	Erma Bombeck
August 13	Not published due to a newspaper strike	
August 20	Not published due to a newspaper strike	
August 27	Not published due to a newspaper strike	
September 3	Not published due to a newspaper strike	
September 10	Not published due to a newspaper strike	
September 17	Not published due to a newspaper strike	
September 24	Not published due to a newspaper strike	
October 1	Not published due to a newspaper strike	
October 8	Not published due to a newspaper strike	
October 15	Not published due to a newspaper strike	
October 22	Not published due to a newspaper strike	
October 29	Not published due to a newspaper strike	
November 5	Not published due to a newspaper strike	
November 12	If Life is a Bowl of Cherries, What Am I Doing in the Pits?	Erma Bombeck
November 19	If Life is a Bowl of Cherries, What Am I Doing in the Pits?	Erma Bombeck
November 26	Mommie Dearest	Christina Crawford
December 3	Mommie Dearest	Christina Crawford
December 10	Mommie Dearest	Christina Crawford
December 17	Mommie Dearest	Christina Crawford
December 24	Mommie Dearest	Christina Crawford
December 31	Mommie Dearest	Christina Crawford

== See also ==
- Publishers Weekly list of bestselling novels in the United States in the 1970s
