= Mr. Blandings Builds His Dream House =

1948 film by H. C. Potter

- Theatrical release poster
- Directed by: H. C. Potter
- Screenplay by: Melvin Frank; Norman Panama
- Based on: Mr. Blandings Builds His Dream House by Eric Hodgins; Mr. Blandings Builds His Castle; 1946 Fortune
- Produced by: Dore Schary; Melvin Frank; Norman Panama
- Starring: Cary Grant; Myrna Loy; Melvyn Douglas; Reginald Denny; Sharyn Moffett; Connie Marshall; Louise Beavers; Ian Wolfe
- Narrated by: Melvyn Douglas
- Cinematography: James Wong Howe
- Edited by: Harry Marker
- Music by: Leigh Harline
- Production company: RKO Radio Pictures
- Distributed by: Selznick Releasing Organization
- Release dates: 25 March 1948; (New York); June 4, 1948 (US)
- Running time: 94 minutes
- Country: United States
- Language: English
- Box office: $2,750,000 (US rentals)

Mr. Blandings Builds His Dream House is a 1948 American comedy film directed by H. C. Potter, and starring Cary Grant, Myrna Loy and Melvyn Douglas. Written and produced by the team of Melvin Frank and Norman Panama, it was an adaptation of the 1946 novel of the same name written by Eric Hodgins and illustrated by William Steig. The story follows a married couple who encounter constant problems after their purchase and remodel of a home in the country.

The movie was the third and last pairing of Grant and Loy, who had shared good chemistry in The Bachelor and the Bobby-Soxer (1947) and Wings in the Dark (1935).

It was a box office hit upon its release. Warner Home Video released it to DVD with restored and remastered audio and video in 2004. It was loosely remade in 1986 as The Money Pit, starring Tom Hanks and Shelley Long, and in 2007 as Are We Done Yet?, starring Ice Cube.

== Plot ==
In the late 1940s, Jim Blandings, a successful account executive in the advertising business, lives with his wife Muriel and two daughters, Betsy and Joan, in a cramped New York apartment. Muriel secretly plans to knock out a wall and remodel their apartment for $7,000. After rejecting this idea, Jim comes across an ad for new homes in Connecticut and they get excited about moving. Planning to purchase and "fix up" an old home, they contact a real estate agent, who persuades them to buy "the old Hackett Place" in (fictional) Lansdale County, Connecticut—a leaning, dilapidated, nearly 200-year old farmhouse on some 35 acres where, they are told, General Gates stopped to water his horses during the Revolutionary War. They buy the property for five times the going rate per acre for locals, provoking Jim's friend and lawyer Bill Cole to chastise him for following his heart rather than his head.

The old house turns out to be structurally unsound and must be torn down before the previous owner's mortgage is paid off. The Blandings hire architect Henry Simms to design and supervise the construction of a new home for $18,000, which Muriel insists must have four bedrooms and four bathrooms. From the original purchase to the completion of the new home, a long litany of unforeseen troubles and setbacks—including digging a deep well only to find a spring just a few feet under the foundation—beset the hapless Blandings. The demolished house's owner also sues them for the balance of his mortgage. Meanwhile, back in the city, Jim is assigned the task of creating an advertising slogan for a Spam-like product called WHAM, an account that has destroyed the careers of the previous executives assigned to it. Jim also suspects that Muriel is cheating on him when Bill spends a night in the house during a violent thunderstorm, with Muriel being the only other person present.

With mounting pressure, skyrocketing costs, and the encroaching deadline for his assignment, Jim starts to wonder why he wanted to live in the country. Bill observes that although he has been the voice of doom, pointing out all the ways they were being cheated, when he looks at what they have finally built, he realizes that some things "you do buy with your heart and not your head. Maybe those are the things that really count.” Gussie, the Blandings maid and cook, provides Jim with the perfect WHAM slogan—"If you ain't eating WHAM, you ain't eating ham"—and saves his job. The Blandings reward her with a $10 raise, and her likeness is used in the WHAM ad campaign. The film ends with the family and Bill enjoying the beautiful front yard. Jim, who is seen reading the book Mr. Blandings Builds His Dream House, invites the audience to “drop in and see us some time.”

== Cast ==
- Cary Grant as James Blandings
- Myrna Loy as Muriel Blandings, James's wife
- Melvyn Douglas as William "Bill" Cole
- Reginald Denny as Henry Simms
- Sharyn Moffett as Joan Blandings, James & Muriel's second daughter
- Connie Marshall as Betsy Blandings, James & Muriel's first daughter
- Louise Beavers as Gussie
- Ian Wolfe as Real Estate Agent Smith
- Harry Shannon as W. D. Tesander
- Tito Vuolo as Mr. Zucca
- Nestor Paiva as Joe Apollonio
- Jason Robards Sr. as John Retch
- Lurene Tuttle as Mary
- Lex Barker as Carpenter Foreman
- Emory Parnell as Mr. PeDelford

== Reception ==
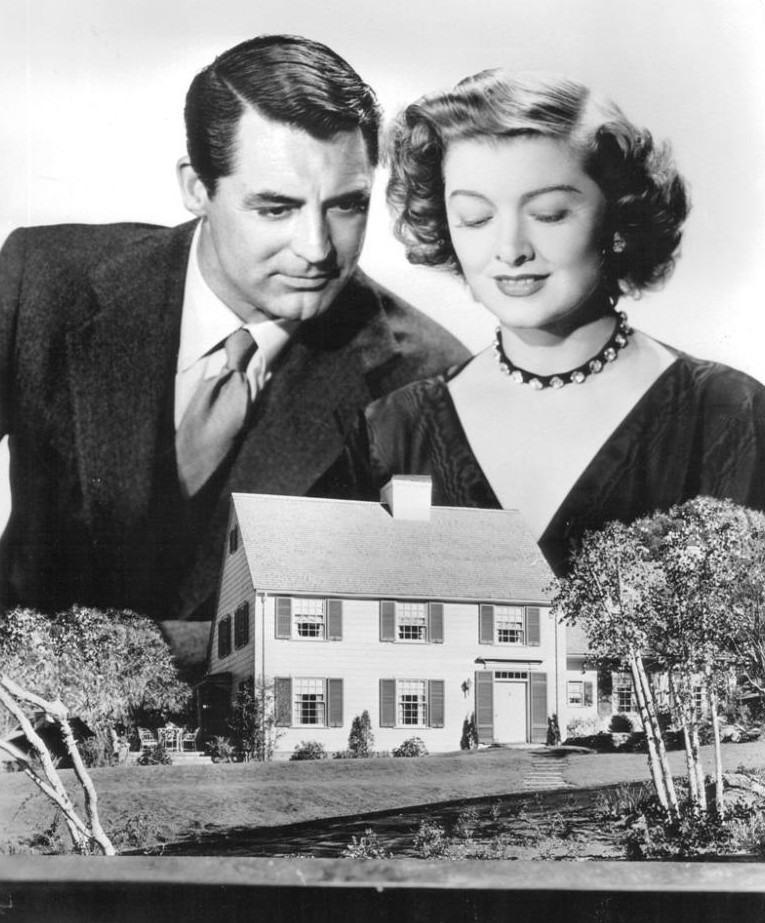
Promotional still for film with Cary Grant and Myrna Loy

According to Time magazine, "Cary Grant, Myrna Loy and Melvyn Douglas have a highly experienced way with this sort of comedy, and director H. C. Potter is so much at home with it that he gets additional laughs out of the predatory rustics and even out of the avid gestures of a steam shovel. Blandings may turn out to be too citified for small-town audiences, and incomprehensible abroad; but among those millions of Americans who have tried to feather a country nest with city greenbacks, it ought to hit the jackpot."

Bosley Crowther of The New York Times wrote that "as straight entertainment, this ambling and genial report on a young advertising man's disasters (and final triumph) in becoming a country squire is as much casual fun as can be looked for on our sparsely provided screen."

Variety called it "a mildly amusing comedy" with Grant "up to his usual performance standard," but found the script to be flawed when an "unnecessary jealousy twist is introduced, neither advancing the story nor adding laughs."

John McCarten of The New Yorker described the film as "quite ingeniously put together," comparing it to George Washington Slept Here and finding it "just as amiable" as that earlier film.

Harrison's Reports called the film "a first-rate topical comedy farce ... The story itself is a flimsy affair, but it is so rich in witty dialogue and in comedy incidents that one is kept laughing all the time."

While quite popular, according to one source the film actually recorded a loss of $225,000 during its initial theatrical release.

The film is recognized by American Film Institute in these lists:

- 2000: AFI's 100 Years...100 Laughs – #72

== Promotion ==
As a promotion for the film, the studio built 73 "dream houses" in various locations in the United States, selling some of them by raffle; over 60 were equipped by General Electric. Thousands lined up in front of the house that was built in Ottawa Hills, Ohio, paying admission to view it at its opening.

In Phoenix, Arizona, the dream house was a ranch house built by P.W. Womack Construction Company in a central city development called BelAir (now part of Encanto Village). The dream house built in Rocky Mount, North Carolina still stands at 1515 Lafayette Avenue. In Greensboro, North Carolina, the house was built in the Starmount Forest community.

The home that was built in Omaha, Nebraska still stands. It is located at 502 North 72nd Ave and retains the original look even today. Approximately 30,000 people toured the home before it was raffled off.

The home that was built in Bakersfield, California on Beech St. was built in 1948 and was the first home in the Westchester neighborhood.

== Related works ==
The story behind the film began as an April 1946 article written by Eric Hodgins for Fortune magazine. It was reprinted in Reader's Digest and (in condensed form) in Life before being published as a novel.

A half-hour radio adaptation of the movie was broadcast on NBC's Screen Directors Playhouse on July 1, 1949. Grant reprised his role as Jim Blandings, and Frances Robinson played his wife Muriel. On October 10, 1949 CBS's Lux Radio Theatre presented a one-hour adaptation, with Irene Dunne as Muriel. Screen Directors Playhouse gave a second performance of its half-hour version on June 9, 1950, this time with Grant's wife Betsy Drake as Muriel.

On January 21, 1951, Mr. and Mrs. Blandings, a weekly comedy radio series starring Cary Grant and Betsy Drake, premiered on NBC. Sponsored by Trans-World Airlines, it followed the adventures of the Blandings family after their move into their dream house.

An episode of the 1950s television anthology series Stage 7, titled The Hayfield, aired on September 18, 1955, and was based on the Blandings characters. The episode was a television pilot produced by Four Star Productions for a planned but ultimately unproduced weekly series, Blandings' Way. Macdonald Carey and Phyllis Thaxter played the Blandings in this version. In the episode, Mr. Blandings attempts to clear a hayfield on his property by burning it off, with predictably disastrous results.

In the late 1950s, Screen Gems Productions also proposed The Blandings, a weekly TV series featuring the family. Robert Rockwell was considered for the lead, but the pilot featured Steve Dunne instead, with Maggie Hayes. The series was never produced, but the pilot ran on April 27, 1959 as an episode of Goodyear Theatre titled A Light in the Fruit Closet.

== Buildings ==
The house built for the 1948 film still stands, on the old Fox Ranch property in Malibu Creek State Park, in the hills a few miles north of Malibu. (Note: 34°5′41.4″N 118°42′43.63″W) It is used as the park's office, and as offices for the Santa Monica Mountains Conservancy.

In a promotion for the film, RKO built 73 replica houses around the US, such as Spokane in Washington; Hartford, Bridgeport, Trumbull and Wethersfield in Connecticut; Warwick in Rhode Island; Worcester, Natick, Newton and Springfield in Massachusetts; and Pittsburgh in Pennsylvania. They were sold by raffle contests and other methods, with General Electric.

In 1950, after seeing the film at a local theater, dentist Luther Werner Fetter and his wife Mary purchased the plans for the house from RKO, which produced the film, and built a complete replica of it on Mt. Joy Street in Elizabethtown, Pennsylvania. They moved into the house that Christmas. After Mary Fetter died in an automobile accident in 1960, Dr. Fetter remained the house's sole occupant until his death in 2002.

In real life, the family of the author, Eric Hodgins, built their house in the Litchfield County town of New Milford, Connecticut. In 1945, Hodgins sold, for $38,000, to John Allard, a retired Air Force general. In 1953, for $40,000, Ralph Gulliver, a New Milford fuel dealer, bought the property. In 1972, his son, Jack and Jill Gulliver lived there. It was sold in 1980 for an undisclosed amount, and 2004 for $1.2 million.

== Remakes ==
- The Money Pit, 1986 film starring Tom Hanks and Shelley Long
- Drömkåken, 1993 Swedish film and direct remake of The Money Pit
- Are We Done Yet? (a sequel to the 2005 film Are We There Yet?), a remake of Mr. Blandings Builds His Dream House starring Ice Cube, released on April 4, 2007
- La Maison du Bonheur, 2006 French film and direct remake directed by Dany Boon

== Similar themes ==
- George Washington Slept Here, a 1942 film based on a 1940 play about a couple who refurbish a broken-down old house of some possible historical significance
