= Eric Hodgins =

American writer (1899–1971)

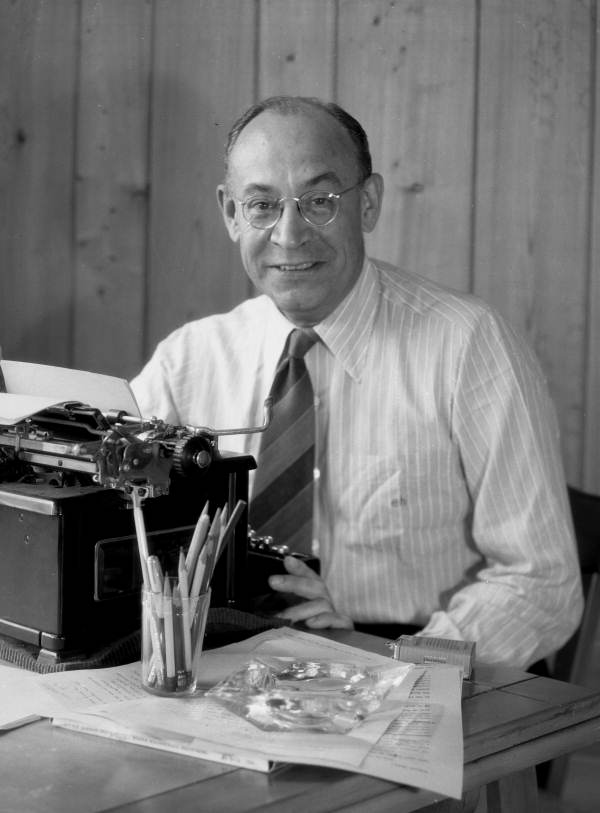
- Portrait of author Eric Hodgins in 1948. Photograph by Joseph Janney Steinmetz, held by State Archives of Florida.
- Born: March 2, 1899; Detroit
- Died: January 7, 1971 (aged 71); New York City

Eric Francis Hodgins (March 2, 1899 – January 7, 1971) was the American author of the popular novel Mr. Blandings Builds His Dream House, illustrated by William Steig.

== Biography ==
Hodgins was born in Detroit, Michigan to the Episcopal clergyman Frederic Brinkley Hodgins and Edith Gertrude Bull on March 2, 1899. He attended the Trinity School in New York City, from which he graduated in 1917. After working for a year, he entered Cornell University in 1918 and transferred to Massachusetts Institute of Technology in Autumn 1919.

He graduated from MIT in 1922 with a chemical engineering degree. While at MIT, he was editor of VooDoo, the student humor magazine. After graduation, he was managing editor of Technology Review until 1927. From 1927 to 1929, he was editor of The Youth's Companion. In 1929, he became an advertising salesman and then associate editor for Redbook. In 1933, he became associate managing editor of Fortune magazine, promoted to managing editor in 1935 and publisher from 1937 to 1941. From 1941 to 1946 he was a vice-president of Time Inc. While at Fortune, he wrote an exposé of the European munitions industry, published in March 1934 as "Arms and the Men". He resigned from Time Inc. in 1946 to become a full-time writer.

In 1930, he married Catherine Carlson, who had been an editorial assistant at The Youth's Companion. She died on January 20, 1933 while giving birth to their son, Roderic. In 1936, he married Eleanor Treacy, an art editor at Fortune, with whom he had a daughter, Patricia.

From 1929 to 1932, he wrote several books on aviation and transportation with Frederick Alexander Magoun, who had been an instructor at MIT when Hodgins was a student there. In April 1946, he wrote an article for Fortune called "Mr. Blandings Builds His Castle", a fictional account of the real-life troubles he encountered while building a house in New Milford, Connecticut. Later that year, he turned the article into a book, Mr. Blandings Builds His Dream House, which was a best-seller. The novel was adapted as a popular movie of the same name, starring Cary Grant and Myrna Loy.

In real life, the house was completed in 1939 but was so expensive (costing $56,000 while the original budget was $11,000), that Hodgins was forced to sell it in 1945 for $38,000 to John Allard, a retired Air Force general. Hodgins unsuccessfully tried to buy the house back after receiving $200,000 from movie rights to the book. In 1953, the house was sold to Ralph Gulliver who gave it to his son Jack in 1972. In 1980, the house was sold to the author and composer Stephen Citron and his wife, the biographer and novelist Anne Edwards. In 2004, the house was sold for $1.2 million.

His next novel was a sequel called Blandings' Way about a liberal man working in advertising who wanted to do good but was accused of being a Communist. He thought it was a better book, but it was overshadowed by the success of the earlier one.

On January 8, 1960, he suffered a stroke. He described the stroke and long recovery in Episode: Report On the Accident Inside My Skull, published in 1964. It received the Howard W. Blakeslee Award from the American Heart Association. At the time of his death in 1971, he was writing an autobiography that was published posthumously as Trolley to the Moon: An Autobiography

== Works ==
=== Novels ===
Blandings series:

1. Mr. Blandings Builds His Dream House (1946), illustrated by William Steig, ISBN 978-0897332453
2. Blandings' Way (1950), ISBN 9780243385454

=== Short stories ===
- "Mr. Blandings Builds His Castle" (1946), expanded into novel Mr. Blandings Builds His Dream House

=== Non-fiction ===
Autobiographies

- Episode: Report On the Accident Inside My Skull (1964), ISBN 978-0671210434, memoirs
- Trolley to the Moon: An Autobiography (1973), ISBN 978-0671214401, published posthumously

History

- Sky High: The Story of Aviation (1929), co-authored with Frederick Alexander Magoun, ISBN 9781127529452
- A History of Aircraft (1931), co-authored with Frederick Alexander Magoun, ISBN 9780405037740
- Behemoth: The Story of Power (1932), co-authored with Frederick Alexander Magoun, ISBN 9781603220019
- Ocean Express: The Story of the Bremen and the Europa (1932), ASIN B002TXMPY0
- The span of Time: A primer history of Time Incorporated (1946), ASIN B0007FWXXA

Society

- Enough Time?: The Pattern of Executive Life (1959), ISBN 978-0548385821

== Adaptations ==
- Mr. Blandings Builds His Dream House (1948), film directed by H. C. Potter, based on novel Mr. Blandings Builds His Dream House
- The Money Pit (1986), film directed by Richard Benjamin, based on novel Mr. Blandings Builds His Dream House
- Drömkåken (1993), film directed by Peter Dalle, based on novel Mr. Blandings Builds His Dream House
- Are We Done Yet? (2007), film directed by Steve Carr, based on novel Mr. Blandings Builds His Dream House
