= Robert Cantwell =

American novelist and critic

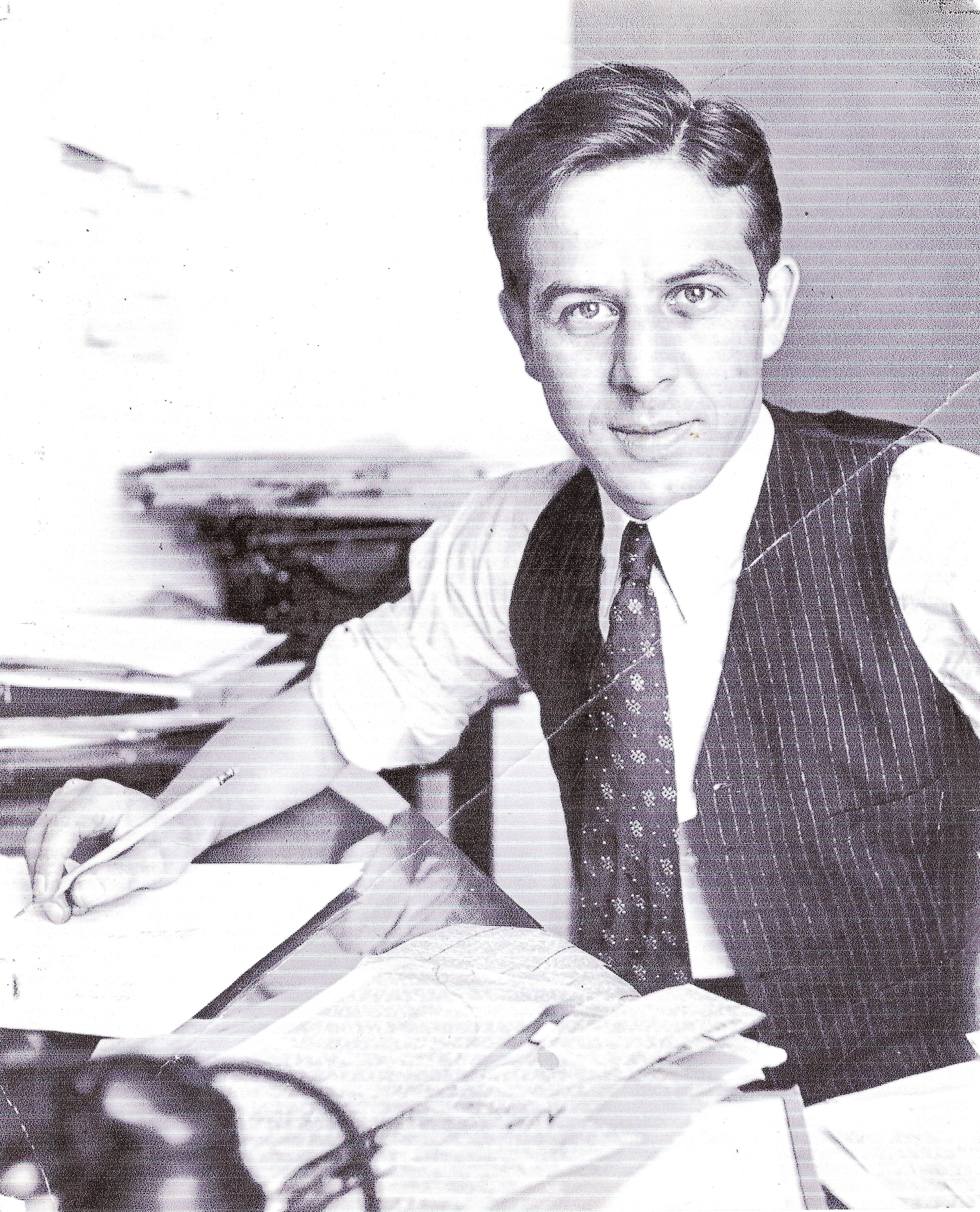
- Cantwell in the 1930s
- Born: Robert Emmett Cantwell; January 31, 1908; Little Falls (now Vader), Washington, US
- Died: December 8, 1978 (aged 70); New York City, US
- Other name: Robert Simmons (pen name)
- Education: University of Washington
- Occupations: Novelist; biographer; essayist; editor
- Years active: 1929–1978
- Employer(s): Time, Fortune, Newsweek, Sports Illustrated
- Notable work: The Land of Plenty (1934)
- Spouse: Mary Elizabeth Chambers
- Children: 3

Robert Emmett Cantwell (January 31, 1908 – December 8, 1978), known as Robert Cantwell, was a novelist and critic. His first novel, Laugh and Lie Down (1931) is an early example, twenty years before Jack Kerouac, of the American classic genre the "road novel", and also an important example of the "Depression novel" period genre. His most notable work, The Land of Plenty, focuses on a lumber mill in a thinly disguised version of his hometown in Washington state.

== Background ==
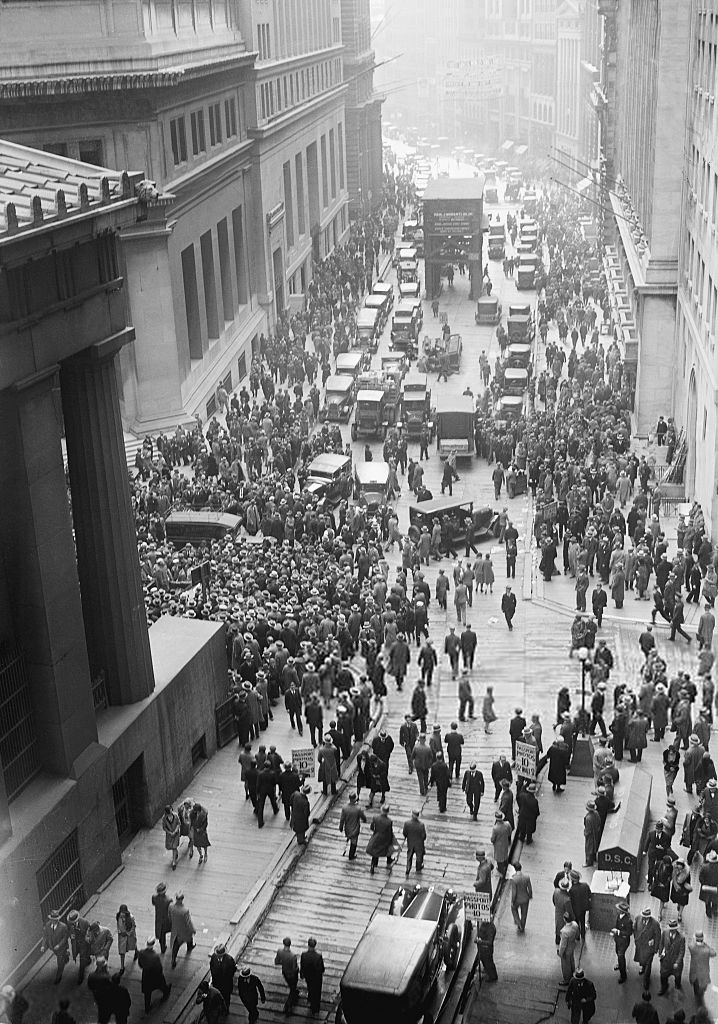
Crowd gathering at Wall Street and Broad Street after 1929 crash - the Great Depression shaped Cantwell's experience in New York City

Robert Emmett Cantwell was born on January 31, 1908, in Little Falls (now Vader), Washington. His parents were Charles James Cantwell, an engineer, and Nina Adelia Hanson. He had an older sibling James Leroy and younger siblings Frances Dorothy and Charles Harry. He attended the University of Washington (1924−1925) and then spent the next four years working at Harbor Plywood Co., (1925−1929) in Hoquiam, Washington.

In 1919, the massacre during a strike in nearby Centralia, Washington, deeply disturbed him and left a lasting impression that appeared in his major writings.

== Career ==
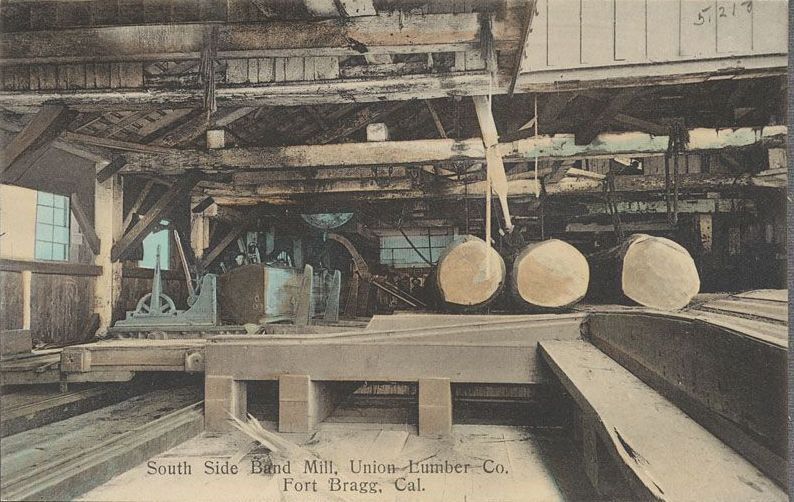
Sawmill, Union Lumber Company, Fort Bragg, California 1920s

In 1929, after selling a short story "Hanging by My Thumbs" to The New American Caravan, he moved (with help from childhood friend Calvin Fixx) to New York City, landed a book contract with Farrar and Rinehart, and began work on his first novel, Laugh and Lie Down (1931). From 1930 to 1935 (and during the Great Depression), he wrote a second novel, The Land of Plenty (1934). He published a number of short stories in The Miscellany, American Caravan, Pagany, and The New Republic. In December 1933, he accepted work already passed over by Whittaker Chambers, namely to co-write a biography of Boston's E. A. Filene, in collaboration with Lincoln Steffens. The same month, Steffens suffered a heart-attack and died in 1936; Cantwell handed the manuscript to Filene in 1937.

Throughout the 1930s, Cantwell began to meet New York writers and editors such as Edmund Wilson, Malcolm Cowley, John Chamberlain, Erskine Caldwell, Matthew Josephson, and Harry Hansen. Over time, his circle expanded to include James T. Farrell, Meyer Schapiro, John Dos Passos, Newton Arvin, Kenneth Burke, Granville Hicks, Kenneth Fearing, Fred Dupee, Elof Holmlund, and Whittaker Chambers.

In the 1930s, "After he settled in New York, Cantwell was always short of money and therefore generally in a rush to finish a piece and get paid... All the more remarkable, then, that his short stories are of such a generally high aesthetic quality."

Meantime, to support himself while writing, Cantwell took on regular-paying jobs. From November 1932 until its close in 1935, he worked as literary editor of New Outlook magazine. He also wrote for the New Masses under pen name "Robert Simmons." At some point between 1933 and 1936, he worked as assistant literary editor at The New Republic under Malcolm Cowley, who was literary editor, according to Mary McCarthy in her 1992 posthumous Intellectual Memoirs: New York, 1936–1938; McCarthy also remembers him in the mid-1930s as "a Communist, a real member."

=== Time magazine ===
On April 23, 1935, and through 1936, Cantwell joined the editorial staff of Time as book reviewer. In 1937, he joined Time's sister magazine, Fortune. In 1938, he returned to Time as associate editor (1938−1945). In 1939, he helped his friend Chambers get his old job as book reviewer. In 1940, William Saroyan lists Cantwell among "associate editors" at Time in Saroyan's play, Love's Old Sweet Song.

In 1941, Cantwell suffered a nervous breakdown. He took off work and received treatment at the Bloomingdale Insane Asylum. He spent three years researching and writing the biography, Nathaniel Hawthorne: The American Years (1948).

From 1949 to 1954 he worked as the literary editor of Newsweek.

=== Sports Illustrated magazine ===
In 1954, he took up freelancing again until 1956 when he began an association with Sports Illustrated.

He worked for the magazine from 1956 until his death in 1978. He worked on a number of articles, three of which became books: Alexander Wilson: Naturalist and Pioneer (1961), The Real McCoy (1971), and The Hidden Northwest (1972). Subjects of his articles include chess, ornithology, sports in the movies and literary figures in sports.

== Personal life and death ==
Cantwell married Mary Elizabeth Chambers, known as Betsy, a teacher, on February 2, 1931: she (no relation to Whittaker Chambers) was a cousin of Lyle Saxon, whom Fixx had been serving as secretary. They had three children: Joan McNiece (Mrs. George Stolz Jr.), Betsy Ann (Mrs. Walter Pusey III), and Mary Elizabeth Emmett (Mrs. Lars-Erik Nelson).

He later married Allison Joy, a noted portrait painter, and, briefly, Eva Stolz Gilleran shortly before his death in 1978.

Cantwell was rumored to have been the inspiration for many of the scenes in the Eric Hodgins novel Mr. Blandings Builds His Dream House. While working together at Fortune, Cantwell had encouraged Hodgins to purchase a property not far from his own house in Sherman, Connecticut, and Cantwell's two daughters at the time had the same names as the two daughters in the novel: Betsy and Joan.

During the Hiss Case, the FBI often lurked around Cantwell's home in Sherman and questioned neighbors.

Cantwell dismissed his radical affiliations of youth obliquely in later life, saying "I had no interest in politics" and no (public) political aspirations. Nevertheless, his circle in the 1930s was a strong Leftist one that included Schapiro (Marxist), Cowley (Communist Party fellow traveller), Holmlund and Calvin Fixx (Communist Party members), and Chambers (Soviet spy). Further, his correspondence shows a strong interest, for example, in the CPUSA ticket for 1932 elections, which included William Z. Foster for president and James W. Ford for vice president. He also joined the League of Professional Writers for Foster and Ford. (Cantwell noted that he voted for Roosevelt so he would not "throw away" his vote.) Also in the fall of 1932, he traveled to Washington, DC, with Cowley to cover the National Hunger March for The New Republic. Biographer Per Seyersted concluded, "That Cantwell did not use correct Marxist terminology would seem to indicate that he was no CP member, that however to the left he was and in sympathy with the Party's aims, he was an independent person doing his own thinking." This reflected his background in West Coast populist-progressive-anarchist political culture, something quite different from New York City European-oriented doctrinaire Marxism—the Grange, the Progressive Party, the Wobblies, rather than the regimen of Marxist–Leninist-Stalinist party discipline. The Centralia strikers were Wobblies.

He died in 1978, aged 70, in St. Luke's hospital in New York City, after suffering a heart attack two weeks earlier.

In his obituary, Sports Illustrated wrote:

Bob Cantwell was with us during the last 22 years of his life, in which he wrote dozens of memorable articles, among them a portrayal of Cecil Smith, the Texas cowboy who became perhaps the greatest polo player the world has ever seen. When Cantwell wrote of Banjo Paterson, the virtually unknown author of Waltzing Matilda, he made sure that a colorful footnote to history was not going to be lost, at least not to SI readers. As he once said, "History is a natural resource, just as much as fossil fuel. It's what is there. We should not ignore it." Bob Cantwell was a unique intellectual resource and a friend. We shall miss him.

Cantwell's correspondence includes: James T. Farrell, John Dos Passos, Ernest Hemingway, Van Wyck Brooks, Erskine Caldwell, Malcolm Cowley, Henry Luce, Clare Boothe Luce, Marianne Moore, T. S. Matthews, and Edmund Wilson.

Other members of his family are of note: his great-grandfather was Michael Troutman Simmons, known for establishing the first permanent settlement in what is now Tacoma, Washington, and his nephew, Colin Cantwell, is known for, among other things, designing the Death Star in Star Wars.

== Impact ==
=== Literature ===
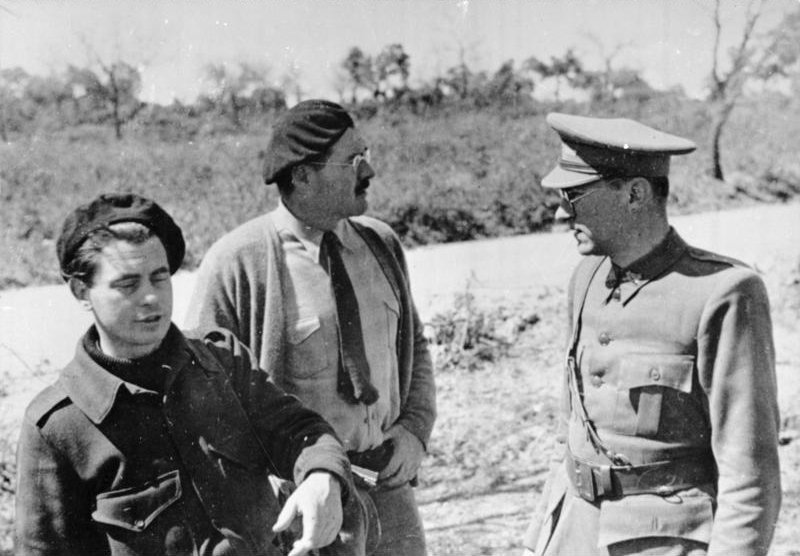
Hemingway (center) with Dutch filmmaker Joris Ivens and German writer Ludwig Renn during Spanish Civil War, 1937 - Hemingway was one of Cantwell's greatest and longest-term admirers

Ernest Hemingway considered Cantwell "his best bet" in American fiction.

F. Scott Fitzgerald wrote of Cantwell's first short story, "Hanging by My Thumbs": "Mark it well, for my guess is that he's learned a better lesson from Proust than Thornton Wilder did and has a destiny of no mean star."

T. S. Matthews wrote, "Before I met him, I knew that he was reported to be the best book reviewer in New York; after only three book reviews, everybody admitted it."

=== Time magazine ===
Cantwell, his close colleagues, and many staff members as of the 1930s helped elevate Time–"interstitial intellectuals," as historian Robert Vanderlan has called them. Colleague John Hersey described them as follows:

Time was in an interesting phase; an editor named Tom Matthews had gathered a brilliant group of writers, including James Agee, Robert Fitzgerald, Whittaker Chambers, Robert Cantwell, Louis Kronenberger, and Calvin Fixx... They were dazzling. Time's style was still very hokey—“backward ran sentences till reeled the mind”—but I could tell, even as a neophyte, who had written each of the pieces in the magazine, because each of these writers had such a distinctive voice.

=== Hiss Case ===
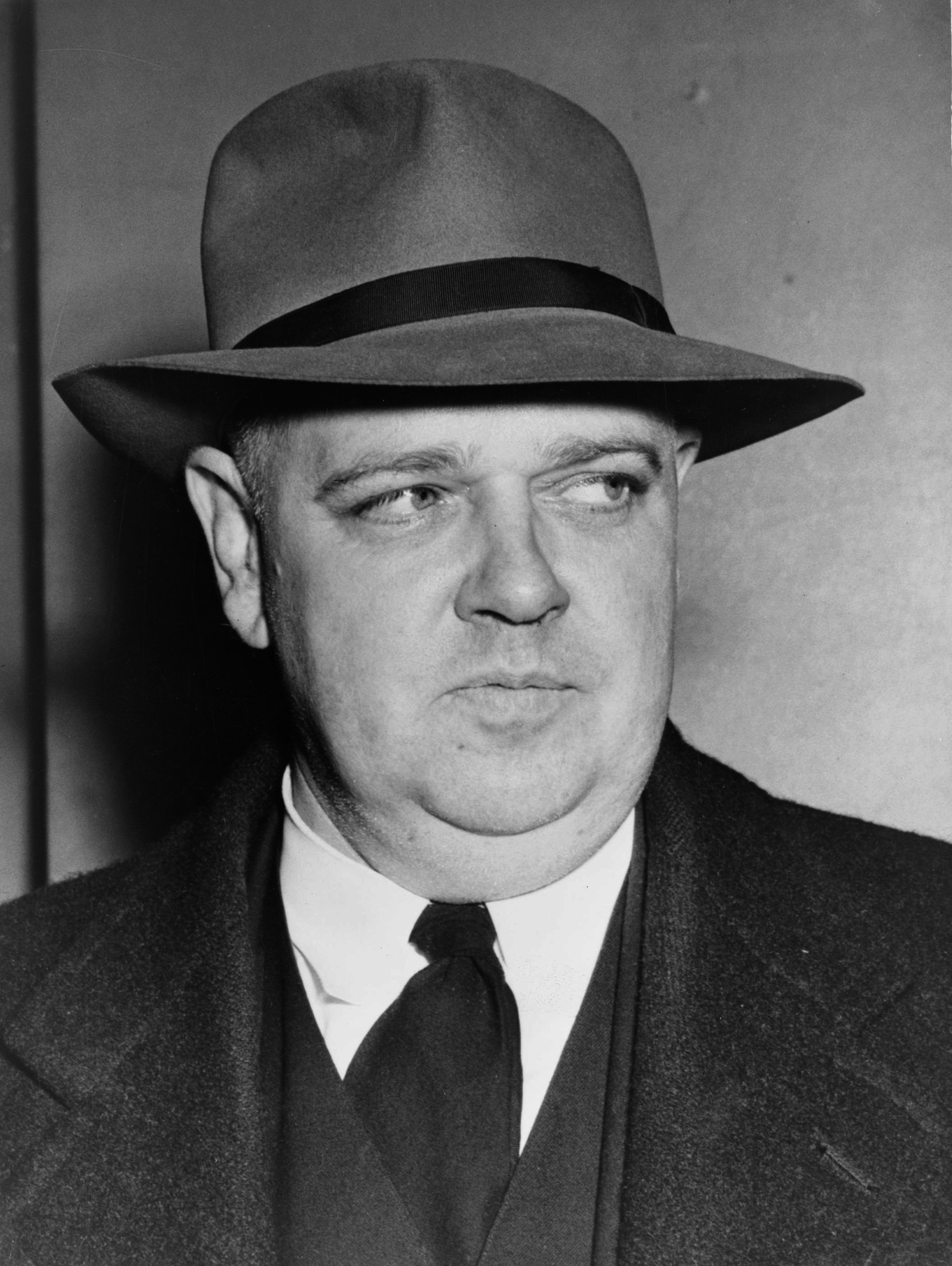
Whittaker Chambers joined Calvin Fixx as close friend of Cantwell's, then became an emblem of his fears

In October 1931, Cantwell attended a dinner party in honor of his first novel, Laugh and Lie Down, where he met Whittaker Chambers, friend Mike Intrator, and Intrator's wife Grace Lumpkin. At the time, Chambers had become an editor at the New Masses magazine; he and Cantwell became "very close friends." Soon after meeting, Cantwell joined the John Reed Club.

When Chambers went into the Soviet underground in mid-1932, Cantwell knew; he declined to let Chambers use his home as a letter drop. In April 1934, Cantwell met Chambers' underground comrade, John Loomis Sherman, whom he knew as "Phillips." For the rest of his life, Cantwell would remain unclear about just how much he knew about or was involved in Chambers' underground activities. In May 1934, when Chambers started working with the Ware Group (according to Cantwell's papers), Cantwell accompanied him; about this time, Chambers let Cantwell know that he was using the alias "Lloyd Cantwell" in Baltimore. Biographer Seyersted notes that in his 1952 memoir Witness, Chambers may have changed dates for his first meetings in Washington for the Ware Group to June and later in order to protect Cantwell.

Cantwell helped get Whittaker Chambers a job at Time magazine, as Chambers recounted in his memoirs:

The morning mail brought a letter from my friend, Robert Cantwell, the author of Laugh and Lie Down, and later, the biographer of Nathaniel Hawthorne. Cantwell was then one of the editors of Time magazine ... But his letter ... urged me to go to New York at once. As sometimes happens at Time, several jobs were suddenly open. Cantwell thought that I might get one of them ... Cantwell thought I should try for a book reviewer's job. I wrote several trial reviews. A few days later, Time hired me.

Chambers had used the alias "Lloyd Cantwell" during his time in the Soviet underground, including the formation of the American Feature Writers Syndicate with comrade John Loomis Sherman (using the alias Charles Francis Chase) and literary agent Maxim Lieber. During the Hiss Case, Cantwell's name came up, and he found himself under FBI surveillance. When Chambers published his memoirs, Cantwell wrote a negative review.

Cantwell's mental breakdown in 1941 plus Chambers' use of his surname in the 1930s may well have led the Hiss defense team to conflate the two Cantwells and thus question Chambers' own sanity. ("Is he a man of sanity?" Hiss publicly questioned as early as August 25, 1948.)

In later years, Cantwell would express skepticism that Chambers even was in the underground; at others, he would express great fear of Soviet retribution (for Chambers' defection–and Cantwell's role in it?).

== Works ==
Original works:

- "Hanging by My Thumbs" in The New American Caravan (1931)
- Laugh and Lie Down (1931)
- Land of Plenty (1934, 1971)
- "The Hills around Centralia" in Proletarian Literature in the United States: An Anthology (1935)
- Nathaniel Hawthorne: The American Years (1948, 1971)
- Famous American Men of Letters, illustrated by Gerald McCann (New York: Dodd, Mead, 1956)
- Alexander Wilson: Naturalist and Pioneer: A Biography, decorated by Robert Ball (1961)
- Real McCoy: The Life and Times of Norman Selby (1971)
- Hidden Northwest (1972)

Editorial works:

- The Humorous Side of Erskine Caldwell anthology edited and introduced by Robert Cantwell (1951)
- White Rose of Memphis by William C. Falkner, introduced by Robert Cantwell (1953)
- Charterhouse of Parma, by Marie-Henri Beyle (Stendhal, translated by Lady Mary Loyd, revised by Robert Cantwell, preface by Honoré de Balzac, illustrated by Rafaello Busoni (1955)
- Tess of the d'Urbervilles by Thomas Hardy, introduced by Robert Cantwell (1956)
- Far from the Madding Crowd, by Thomas Hardy, introduced by Robert Cantwell, engraved by Agnes Miller Parker (1958)
- The History of Pendennis by William Makepeace Thackeray, introduced by Robert Cantwell (1961)

Unfinished works:

- Biography of E. A. Filene with Lincoln Steffens (1934)
- Autobiography of James B. McNamara, convicted labor dynamiter
- Small Boston, projected novel from the early 1970s
- The FBI, privacy, and Cantwell's involvement with politics and Whittaker Chambers
- Four Novelists on William Faulkner, Ernest Hemingway, James T. Farrell and Erskine Caldwell

Articles:

Before joining TIME, Cantwell wrote (mostly book reviews) for The New Republic, The Nation, and The Outlook:

- "Lawrence's Last Novel" (Review), The New Republic (December 24, 1930)
- "Selma Lagerlof" (Review), The New Republic (February 25, 1931)
- "Sympathetic to Revolt" (Review), The New Republic (March 25, 1931)
- "California" (Review), The Nation (April 15, 1931)
- "Faulkner's Thirteen Stories" (Review), The New Republic (October 21, 1931)
- "Conflict Between Sisters" (Review), The Saturday Review (November 7, 1931)
- "The Week's Reading" (Review), The Outlook (November 25, 1931)
- "Portrait of America" (Review), The Saturday Review (December 19, 1931)
- "The Wreck of the Gravy Train", The New Republic (January 6, 1932)
- "Second Person Singular" (Review), The Nation (March 9, 1932)
- "Order and Disorder" (Review), The Saturday Review (March 12, 1932)
- "The End of Tradition" (Review), The New Republic (March 30, 1932)
- "Polishing Our Bicycles" (Review), The New Republic (April 6, 1932)
- "Bronx Cheers" (Review), The New Republic (May 25, 1932)
- "Class-Conscious Fiction" (Review), The Nation (May 25, 1932)
- "This Side of Paradise" (Review), The New Republic (July 6, 1932)
- "American Exile" (Review), The Nation (July 20, 1932)
- "Men of the Sea" (Review), The Nation (August 10, 1932)
- "The Importance of Henry James" (Review), The Nation (August 17, 1932)
- "Mr. Eliot's Sunday Afternoon" (Review), The New Republic (September 14, 1932)
- "Distinguished Tedium" (Review), The Nation (September 21, 1932)
- "As I Like It" (Review), Scribners (October 1932)
- "Mr. Waugh's Humor" (Review), The Nation (October 12, 1932)
- "Effective Propaganda" (Review), The Nation (October 19, 1932)
- "The Man of Order" (Review), The New Republic (October 26, 1932)
- "The Man of Order" (Review), The New Republic (October 26, 1932)
- "Outlook's Book Choice of the Month" (Review), The Outlook (November 1932)
- "As I Like It" (Review), Scribners (November 1932)
- "Big Novelist" (Review), The New Republic (November 2, 1932)
- "Outlook Book Choice of the Month" (Review), The Outlook (December 1932)
- "Children's Books" (Review), Scribners (December 1932)
- "Outlook Book Choice of the Month" (Review), The Outlook (January 1933)
- "Outlook Book Choice of the Month" (Review), The Outlook (February 1933)
- "Some Recent Novels" (4 Reviews), The New Republic (February 8, 1933)
- "Outlook Book Choice of the Month" (Review), The Outlook (March 1933)
- "Four Novelists of Tomorrow" (4 Reviews), The New Republic (March 8, 1933)
- "Outlook Book Choice of the Month" (Review), The Outlook (April 1933)
- "Four Novels - Not Without Propaganda" (4 Reviews), The New Republic (April 12, 1933)
- "Outlook Book Choice of the Month" (Review), The Outlook (May 1933)
- "Seventy-five Short Stories" (3 Reviews), The New Republic (May 31, 1933)
- "Outlook Book Choice of the Month" (Review), The Outlook (June 1933)
- "Dramatists' Raw Material" (2 Reviews), The New Republic (June 28, 1933)
- "Outlook Book Choice of the Month" (Review), The Outlook (July 1933)
- "The Social Novelist" (Review), The New Republic (July 5, 1933)
- "The Rover Boys in Wall Street" (Review), The New Republic (July 12, 1933)
- "Books and Reviews" (5 Reviews), The Outlook (August 1933)
- "Outlook Book Choice of the Month" (Review), The Outlook (August 1933)
- "Love Among the Maggots" (Review), The New Republic (August 9, 1933)
- "Outlook Book Choice of the Month" (Review), The Outlook (September 1933)
- "Outlook Book Choices of the Month" (Review), The Outlook (October 1933)
- "The Search for a Hero" (Review), The New Republic (October 4, 1933)
- "Can You Hear Their Voices?" (3 Reviews), The New Republic (October 18, 1933)
- "Outlook Book Choice of the Month" (Review), The Outlook (November 1933)
- "Outstanding Books of the Year," The Outlook (December 1933)
- "Exiles" (2 Reviews), The New Republic (December 13, 1933)
- "Books in Review," The New Republic (December 27, 1933)
- "Outlook Book Choice" (Review), The Outlook (January 1934)
- "Books in Review," The New Republic (January 24, 1934)
- "Books in Review," The New Republic (February 14, 1934)
- "Books and Reviews" (4 Reviews), The Outlook (March 1934)
- "Outlook Book Choice" (Review), The Outlook (March 1934)
- "Books in Review," The New Republic (March 14, 1934)
- "Outlook Book Choice" (Review), "The Outlook" (April 1934)
- "Books and Reviews" (4 Reviews), The Outlook (May 1934)
- "Outlook Book Choice" (Review), The Outlook (May 1934)
- "Outlook Book Choice" (Review), The Outlook (June 1934)
- Outlook Book Choice" (Review), The Outlook (July 1934)
- "Books in Review: The Little Magazines," The New Republic (July 25, 1934)
- "San Francisco: Act One," The New Republic (July 25, 1934)
- "Outlook Book Choices," The Outlook (August 1934)
- "War on the West Coast" (with Evelyn Seeley), The New Republic (August 1, 1934)
- "Books and Reviews (3 Reviews), The Outlook (September 1934)
- "Outlook Book Choice of the Month" (Review), The Outlook (September 1934)
- "Outlook Book Choice" (8 Reviews), The Outlook (October 1934)
- "Strikebreakers" (Review), The Saturday Review (October 20, 1934)
- "Outlook Book Choice" (Review), The Outlook (November 1934)
- "Books and Reviews" (2 Reviews), The Outlook (December 1934)
- "Outlook Book Choice" (Review), The Outlook (December 1934)
- "The Return of Henry James," The New Republic (December 12, 1934)
- "Outstanding Books of the Year," The Outlook (January 1935)
- "The Mystery of Popular Reading," The Outlook (April 1935)
- "Bound Nowhere" (Review), The New Republic (April 10, 1935)
- "Better News from California," The New Republic (May 22, 1935)
- "Both Monologues" (2 Reviews), The New Republic )June 26, 1935)
- "What the Working Class Reads," The New Republic (1935)
- "The Communists and the CIO," The New Republic (1938)

Cantwell wrote articles for TIME and Fortune magazines from 1935 to 1941.

Cantwell wrote articles mostly for Sports Illustrated from 1956 to 1978.

== External sources ==
- Robert Cantwell papers at the University of Oregon
- Lewis, Merrill (1985). Robert Cantwell. Boise State University. ISBN 9780884300441.
- Reed, T.V (2014). Robert Cantwell and the Literary Left: A Northwest Writer Reworks American Fiction. University of Washington.
- Seyersted, Per (2004). Robert Cantwell: An American 1930s Radical Writer and His Apostasy. Oslo: Novus Press. ISBN 978-82-7099-397-0. Archived from the original on 2020-01-26.
