= Jim Fixx =

American fitness advocate and author (1932–1984)

- Born: James Fuller Fixx; April 23, 1932; New York City, U.S.
- Died: July 20, 1984 (aged 52); Hardwick, Vermont, U.S.
- Education: Oberlin College
- Known for: The Complete Book of Running
- Children: 4
- Parent: Calvin Fixx

James Fuller Fixx (April 23, 1932 – July 20, 1984) was an American who wrote the 1977 best-selling book The Complete Book of Running; he is credited with helping start America's fitness revolution by popularizing the sport of running and demonstrating the health benefits of regular jogging. Fixx died of a heart attack while jogging at 52 years of age; his genetic predisposition for heart problems and other previous lifestyle factors may have caused his heart attack.

== Background ==
Born in New York City on April 23, 1932, Fixx graduated from Trinity School in New York and Oberlin College in Ohio. His father, Calvin Fixx, was an editor at Time who worked with Robert Cantwell and Whittaker Chambers.

== Career ==
Fixx was a member of the high-IQ club, Mensa, and published three collections of puzzles: Games for the Super-Intelligent, More Games for the Super-Intelligent, and Solve It! The back flap of his first book says: "... He spent his time running on the roads and trails near his home, training for the Boston Marathon."

Fixx started running in 1967 at age 35. At that time, he weighed 214 pounds (97 kg) and smoked two packs of cigarettes per day. Ten years later, when his book, The Complete Book of Running (which spent 11 weeks at number one on The New York Times Best Seller list) was published, he was 60 pounds (27 kg) lighter and smoke-free. In his books and on television talk shows, he extolled the benefits of physical exercise and how it considerably increased the average life expectancy.

The cover of his book The Complete Book of Running featured Fixx's muscular legs against a red cover. The book sold over a million copies. In 1980, Fixx wrote a follow-up book titled Jim Fixx's Second Book of Running: The Companion Volume to The Complete Book of Running. In 1982, Fixx published Jackpot!, the story of what happened after the publication of The Complete Book of Running when he experienced the "Great American Fame Machine", becoming richer and more celebrated than he could have imagined.

== Death ==
Fixx died on July 20, 1984, at age 52 of a heart attack, during his daily run on Vermont Route 15 in Hardwick. The autopsy, conducted by Vermont's chief medical examiner, Eleanor McQuillen, revealed that atherosclerosis had blocked one coronary artery 95%, a second 85%, and a third 70%.

In 1986, exercise physiologist Kenneth Cooper published an inventory of the risk factors that might have contributed to Fixx's death. Granted access to his medical records and autopsy, and after interviewing his friends and family, Cooper concluded that Fixx was genetically predisposed—his father died of a heart attack at 43 after a previous one at 35, and Fixx himself had a congenitally enlarged heart—and had an unhealthy life: Fixx was a heavy smoker before beginning running at age 36, had a stressful occupation, had undergone a second divorce, and gained weight up to 214 lb (97 kg). Medical opinion continues to uphold the link between moderate exercise and longevity.

== Legacy ==
Maximum Sports Performance, a book by Fixx published posthumously, discusses the physical and psychological benefits of running and other sports, including increased self-esteem, acquiring a "high" from running, and being able to cope better with pressure and tension.

A carved granite monument—a book with an inscription to Jim Fixx from the people of Northeast Scotland—now stands in Hardwick Memorial Park in Hardwick, Vermont.

Comedian Bill Hicks frequently made Fixx the subject of a stand-up routine, humorously suggesting that Fixx's death while jogging should be an argument against exercise (Hicks was a heavy smoker for many years like Fixx, and died from pancreatic cancer aged only 32). Portions of that routine were alleged to have been plagiarized by Denis Leary. Australian band The Fauves referenced Hicks' material in the song "I'm Jim Fixx and I'm Dead Now", on their 2006 album Nervous Flashlights.

== Works ==
- Fixx, James, Games for the Super-Intelligent (1972) Doubleday
- Fixx, James, More Games for the Super-Intelligent (1976) Doubleday
- Fixx, James, The Long Distance Runner: A Definitive Study—preface by James Fixx, edited by Paul Milvy (1977) ISBN 0-89396-000-4
- Fixx, James, The Complete Book of Running (Hardcover), Random House; first edition (1977) ISBN 0-394-41159-5
- Fixx, James, Solve It! by James F. Fixx (1978), Doubleday
- Fixx, James, Jim Fixx's Second Book of Running (Hardcover), Random House; first edition (1980) ISBN 0-394-50898-X
- Fixx, James, Jackpot! (1982) Random House; ISBN 0-394-50899-8
- Fixx, James (with Nike Sports Research Laboratory), Maximum Sports Performance: How to Achieve Your Full Potential in Speed, Endurance, Strength and Coordination (1985) ISBN 0-394-53682-7

== Videos ==
- Fixx, Jim, Jim Fixx On Running (Laserdisc), MCA Videodisc, Inc.; (1980) Color, 53 minutes

== See also ==
- Cardiovascular disease
- Cholesterol
- Healthy diet
- Obesity
