= Blackmail (1939 film) =

1939 film by H. C. Potter

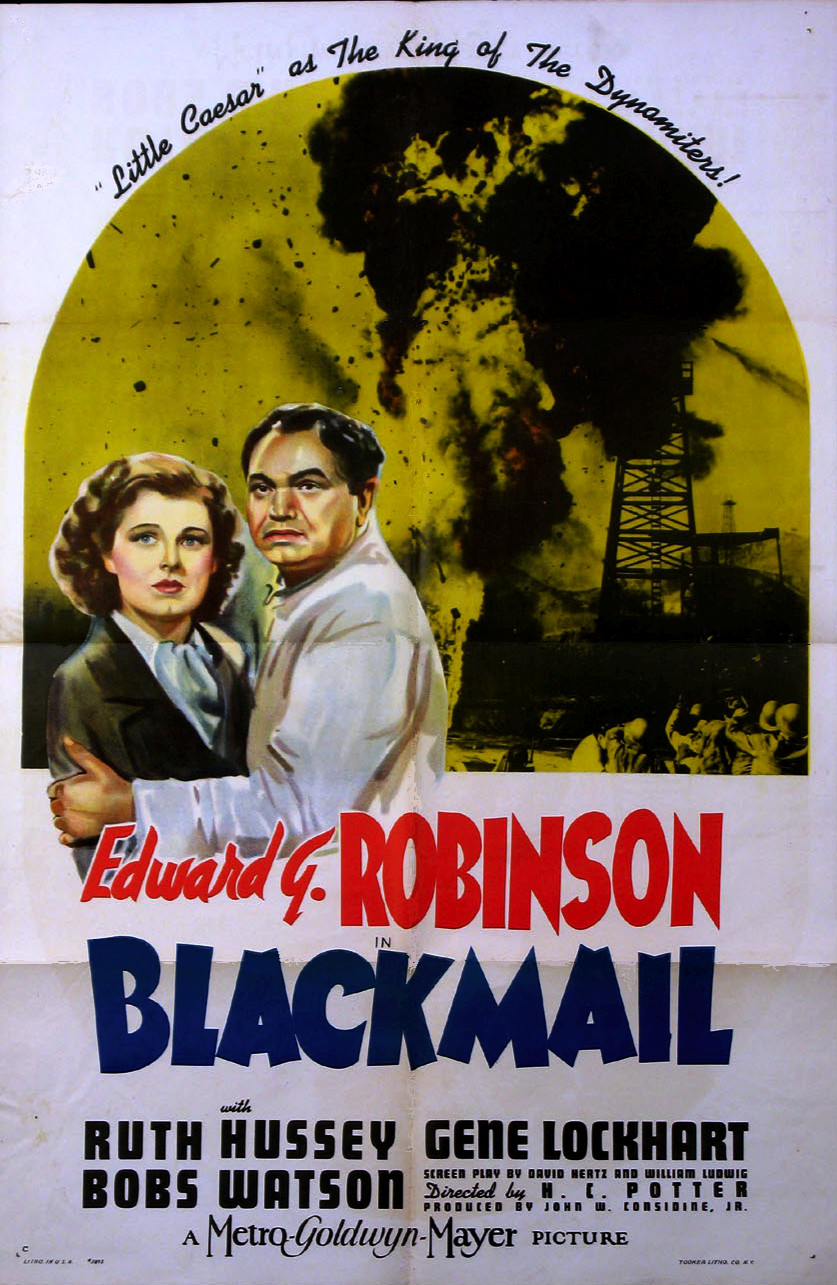
- Theatrical release poster
- Directed by: H. C. Potter
- Written by: Endre Bohem; Dorothy Yost
- Screenplay by: David Hertz; William Ludwig
- Produced by: John W. Considine Jr.
- Starring: Edward G. Robinson; Ruth Hussey; Gene Lockhart
- Cinematography: Clyde De Vinna
- Edited by: Howard O'Neill
- Music by: David Snell; Edward Ward
- Production company: Metro-Goldwyn-Mayer
- Distributed by: Metro-Goldwyn-Mayer
- Release date: September 8, 1939 (U.S.)
- Running time: 81 minutes
- Country: United States
- Language: English

Blackmail is a 1939 American crime drama film directed by H. C. Potter and starring Edward G. Robinson, Ruth Hussey and Gene Lockhart.

== Plot ==
John Ingram is a highly successful oil-field firefighter and a family man. It is a contented life, he has even bought his own oil well in hope of striking it rich. His greatest fears are realized, however, when a man, William Ramey, from his secret past sees Ingram in a newsreel and shows up looking for a job.

Ramey attempts to blackmail Ingram, who had run from a chain gang years ago, and began a new life under an assumed name. After a shady deal is made, Ingram is tricked and Ramey turns him into authorities, who return him to a chain gang. Ramey subsequently becomes a very rich man.

When Ingram finds out about the success of the man who betrayed him, he plans a daring escape in an attempt to return home and get revenge.

Ramey has successfully run Ingram's business in his absence;but only because no emergencies have arisen that would require Ingram's special knowledge.

As fate would have it, the escaped Ingram arrives at the plant just as a major oil fire breaks out.

Overpowering Ramey, Ingram slowly drags him towards the heart of the blaze; hinting that unless Ramey makes a full confession; he will do nothing to save them.

A frightened Ramey agrees. Ingram douses the oil fire, and is eventually restored to his former position of respectability.

== Cast ==
- Edward G. Robinson as John R. Ingram, an alias of John Harrington
- Ruth Hussey as Helen Ingram
- Gene Lockhart as William Ramey
- Bobs Watson as Hank Ingram
- Guinn 'Big Boy' Williams as Moose McCarthy (as Guinn Williams)
- John Wray as Diggs
- Arthur Hohl as Rawlins
- Esther Dale as Sarah
- Frank Darien as Watchman (uncredited)
- Robert Homans as Cooper (uncredited)
- Ethan Laidlaw as Oil Worker (uncredited)
- Harry Tenbrook as Truck Driver (uncredited)

== See also ==
- Cool Hand Luke is a 1967 American prison drama film
- Hellfighters is a 1968 American action film starring John Wayne
