= Louis Kronenberger =

American journalist

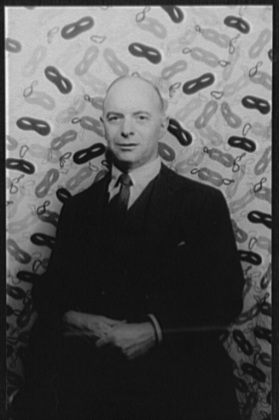
- Louis Kronenberger (1955); Photo by Carl Van Vechten
- Born: December 9, 1904
- Died: April 30, 1980 (aged 75)
- Occupations: Novelist, critic
- Writing career
- Genres: Journalism, biography

Time, where Kronenberger worked (1938–1961)

Louis Kronenberger (December 9, 1904 – April 30, 1980) was an American literary critic (longest with Time, 1938–1961), novelist, and biographer who wrote extensively on drama and the 18th century.

== Background ==
Kronenberger was born in Cincinnati, Ohio, to Louis Kronenberger Sr., a merchant, and Mabel Newwitter. Kronenberger attended the University of Cincinnati from 1921 to 1924, but did not graduate.

== Career ==
=== Writer ===
He moved to New York in 1924 and began his career at the New York Times. In 1926, he became an editor at Boni & Liveright and in 1933, at Alfred A. Knopf.

In 1938, he became drama critic for Time, where he continued to write until 1961. In 1940, William Saroyan listed Kronenberger among the associate editors at Time in the play, Love's Old Sweet Song. Starting in 1942, he worked under Whittaker Chambers, who became editor for the "Back of the Book" (1942–1944). During this period Time was, according to Chambers, "consistently able and sometimes brilliant, because of a small group of men" that included Kronenberger, T. S. Matthews, James Agee, Robert Fitzgerald, Robert Cantwell, Winthrop Sargeant, John K. Jessup, and Calvin Fixx.

In 1940, he also served as a critic for PM and worked there until 1948.

=== Academic ===
Kronenberger was a visiting professor at several universities, including City College of New York, Columbia, Harvard, Berkeley. In 1951, he founded the Department of Theater Arts at Brandeis.

He was associated with numerous organizations for promoting the arts: Yaddo, Lincoln Center Library-Museum, the National Institute of Arts and Letters, and the American Academy of Arts and Sciences.

== Personal and death ==
Kronenberger married Emily L. Plaut in 1940; they had two children : Liza Wanklyn and John Kronenberger.

He died on April 30, 1980.

== Legacy ==
"Kronenberger's praise was a near guarantee of box-office success."

A collection of Louis Kronenberger's papers is held by Princeton University.

== Works ==
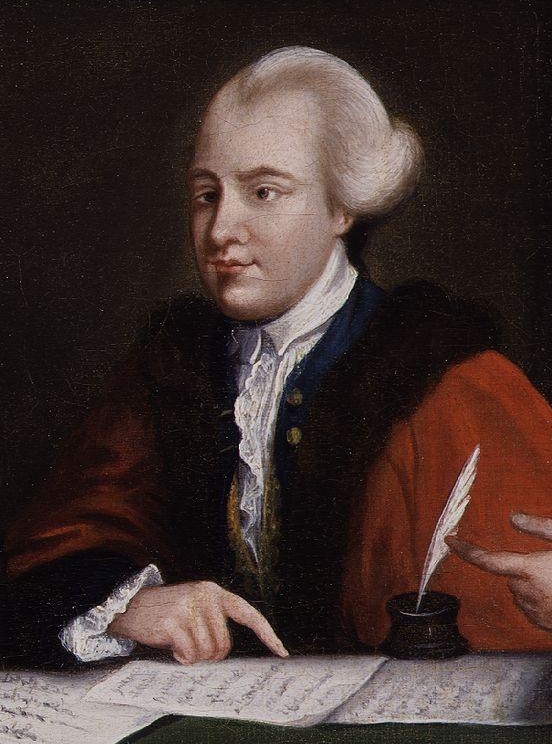
John Wilkes by Richard Houston (1769), about whom Kronenberger wrote in 1974

In his later years, Kronenberger wrote biographies, including one of John Wilkes and another of Oscar Wilde.

Books:

- The Grand Manner (1929)
- Kings and Desperate Men: Life in Eighteenth-Century England (1942)
- Grand Right and Left (1952)
- The Thread of Laughter: Chapters on English Stage Comedy from Jonson to Maugham (1952)
- Company Manners: A Cultural Inquiry into American Life (1954)
- Republic of Letters: Essays on Various Writers (1955)
- Marlborough's Duchess: A Study in Worldliness (1958)
- Madame De Lafayette: The Story of a Patriot's Wife (1959)
- A Month of Sundays (1961)
- The Viking Book of Aphorisms (co-authored with W.H. Auden, 1962)
- Great World: Portraits and Scenes from Greville's Memoirs, 1814-1860 (1963)
- The Cart and the Horse (1964)
- The Polished Surface: Essays in the Literature of Worldliness (1969)
- The Cutting Edge: A Collection of Witty Insults and Wicked Retorts, of Polished Snubs and Homicidal Repartee (1970)
- No Whippings, No Gold Watches (1970) memoirs
- A Mania for Magnificence (1972)
- Animal, Vegetable, Mineral (1972)
- The Last Word: Portraits of Fourteen Master Aphorists (1972)
- Extraordinary Mr. Wilkes: His Life and Times (1974)
- Oscar Wilde (1976)

Editing:

- An Anthology of Light Verse (1935)
- An Eighteenth Century Miscellany (1936)
- Reader's Companion (1945) editor
- The Pleasure of Their Company: An Anthology of Civilized Writing (1946)
- The Indispensable Johnson and Boswell (1950)
- Alexander Pope: Selected Works (1951)
- Cavalcade of Comedy (1953)
- George Bernard Shaw: A Critical Survey (1953)
- The Portable Johnson and Boswell (1955)
- The Maxims of La Rochefoucauld (1959)
- Novelists on Novelists (1962) editor
- Quality: Its Image in the Arts (1969)
- Brief Lives: a Biographical Companion to the Arts (1971)

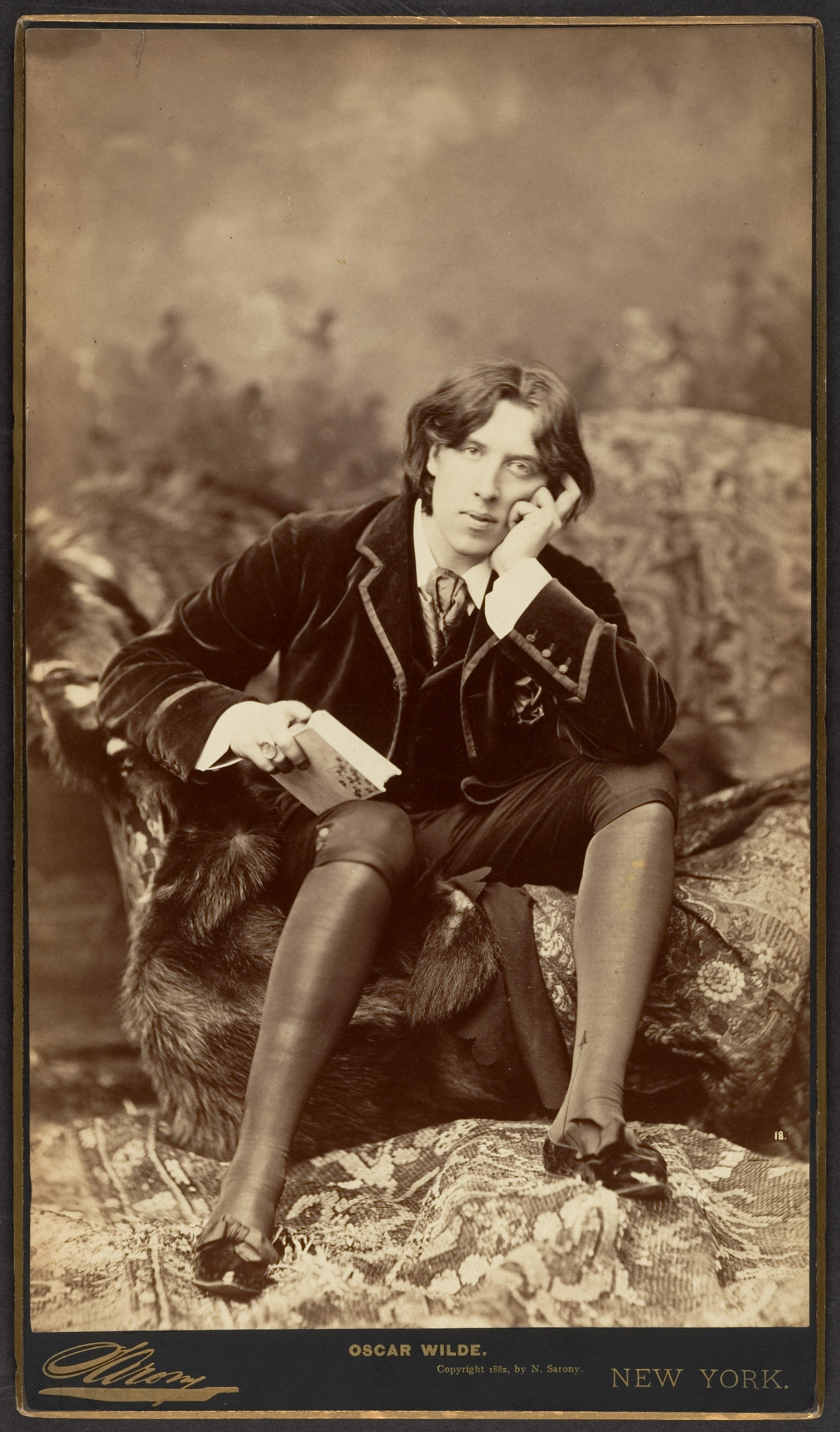
Oscar Wilde by Napoleon Sarony (1882), about whom Kronenberger wrote in 1976

Books edited with others:

- The Faber Book of Aphorisms (1964) with W. H. Auden

Plays written:

- The Heavenly Twins (1955)

Plays translated, adapted:

- Mademoiselle Colombe by Jean Anouilh (New York: Coward-McCann, 1954) translated and adapted from the original Colombe (1951)

Plays edited:

- Best Plays series (1952–1961):
  - The Best Plays of 1952-1953, Burns Mantle Yearbook (1953)
  - The Best Plays of 1953-1954 (1954)
  - The Best Plays of 1954-1955 (1955)
  - The Best Plays of 1955-1956 (1956)
  - The Best Plays of 1956-1957 (1957)
  - The Best Plays of 1957-1958 (1958)
  - The Best Plays of 1958-1959 (1959)
  - The Best Plays of 1959-1960 (1960)
  - The Best Plays of 1960-1961 (1961)
- Four Plays by Bernard Shaw (1953)
- Richard Brinsley Sheridan: Six Plays (1964)

Plays edited with others:

- The Beggar's Opera by John Gay, A Faithful Reproduction of the 1729 Edition (1961) with Max Goberman
- Ibsen (1977) with Harold Clurman
