= Mr. and Mrs. Blandings =

American radio comedy series (1951)

Mr. and Mrs. Blandings is an American radio situation comedy that was broadcast on NBC from January 21, 1951, to June 17, 1951. Based on the novels Mr. Blandings Builds His Dream House and Blandings Way, written by Eric Hodgins, the series featured Cary Grant in his first regular role on a radio program, and it was the first network radio series sponsored by an airline (TWA).

== Overview ==
Real-life spouses Grant and Betsy Drake portrayed Jim and Muriel Blandings, a young married couple who moved from city life to live in the country. Their house was completed, but it had problems: "The door bell sets the washing machine in motion; the front hall light switch rings the doorbell; and communications between the master bedroom and the kitchen are carried on by means of two tin cans connected by a string. Jim Blandings was "a combination of hard-headed businessman and naive seeker of the quiet suburban life". While he worked as an executive in an advertising agency, Muriel dealt with getting the family settled into a new home in a different environment. As the series progressed, the family faced difficulties that included chores, maintenance of the house, relationships with neighbors, and problems related to the school, borough, and county. The Blandings's friend, Bill Cole, was "level-headed (and) alarmingly patient" but often insulted the couple. Their children, Susan and Joan, were played by Anne Whitfield and Patricia Ianola, respectively. Gale Gordon was heard as Bill Cole. Don Stanley was the announcer.

Howard Hughes purchased rights to the Blandings characters and arranged for Trans World Airlines to sponsor the series, which "continued the adventures of the Blandings family in their dream house". The premiere episode found the family getting lost when they moved from their New York apartment to their dream house. When they finally arrived at the house they encountered an unfriendly guard dog that their real estate agent had put there to protect the property.

== Production ==
William Frye and Nat Wolff were the producers. Warren Lewis was the director for the 30-minute program. Writers included Wolff, Jerome Lawrence, and Robert E. Lee. The show originated from NBC's Hollywood Radio City. Episodes were recorded for broadcast on Sundays at 5:30 p.m. Eastern Time. The program used a flexible, semi-spot basis for its commercials. The first two commercials of each episode went to all 61 stations carrying the show. At the third commercial break, 37 stations received "a general TWA message" while the other 27 had "a local cut-in offering a strictly local plug".

Radio historian John Dunning wrote that from the show's onset its scripts caused problems, as they were based on "misunderstandings so far-fetched that critical condemnation was constant and loud". Dunning described "backstage chaos" with Grant and Drake returning five scripts to Wolff, and Drake writing two scripts under the pseudonym Matilda Winkle. As a result of the bickering, Dunning added, "the show died quickly".

== Critical response ==
Jack Gould wrote in The New York Times that the premiere episode of the program "was most disappointing". Gould pointed out two problems: performances of the two stars and flaws in the script. He said that Grant and Drake read their lines in a too-sophisticated way. Regarding the writing, he said, "Much of the dialogue was so utterly implausible and childish that it destroyed whatever credibility the characterizations might have enjoyed." He concluded by suggesting that sincerity and simplicity would improve the show.

John Crosby's review of the program's first two episodes said that the basic plot of each episode should have offered enough complications of its own, but that "the rather lofty, though puzzling exchanges between Mr. and Mrs. Blandings" left listeners puzzled. Crosby wrote that Drake's personality "seems to be obscured in fog" and that she tended to tell stories backwards. Meanwhile, he added, "Grant's distinctive muscle-bound voice is very much in evidence and should be a very great asset in radio comedy" but had thus far had little to say.

The trade publication Billboard called Mr. and Mrs. Blandings "a disappointment", blaming Drake and the show's writers. The review said, "As an actress, Miss Drake's major charm lies in her glowing youthfulness and facial animation. Both assets, of course, were nil on radio. Vocally, the gal was on a par with Johnny-One-Note." With regard to the writers, the review said that the script failed to equal the quality of Hodgins's works. Despite having "a fertile plot field" available, the script had a "yawn-evoking placidity".

A review in the trade publication Broadcasting said that the Blandings were "a couple too innocuous to make enemies, or, for that matter, many friends". The review said that the show's premise "might come off as agreeable comedy" if scripts were written well, but "Unfortunately, passing through a stable of five writers, it is trampled to a pulp." It also noted that a singing commercial for TWA "is far more sprightly than the program".

== Proposed television adaptation ==
In 1955 Don Sharpe acquired television rights to Mr. and Mrs. Blandings with plans for Hodgins to be the head writer. The series was expected to begin in the fall of 1955. Macdonald Carey was to portray Jim Blandings in a TV version of the series, with Phyllis Thaxter as Muriel, Cheryl Holdridge as Joan, and Evelyn Rudie as Susan.
