= Calvin Fixx =

American journalist (1906–1950)

- Born: Calvin Henry Fix; August 1, 1906; Lyman, Idaho, US
- Died: March 3, 1950 (aged 43); Atlantic City, New Jersey, US
- Education: University of Washington
- Occupations: Editor, journalist, writer
- Years active: 1926–1950
- Employer(s): Time, Life
- Organization(s): Time, Inc.
- Spouse: Marlys Virginia Fuller Fixx (1906–his death)
- Children: 2, including Jim Fixx

Calvin Fixx, born Calvin Henry Fix (August 1, 1906 – March 3, 1950), was an American journalist and editor, lifelong friend of Robert Cantwell and friend of Whittaker Chambers, both fellow editors at Time magazine. All three were either Marxist or communist during the 1920s and 1930s but had become anti-communists by 1939.

== Background ==
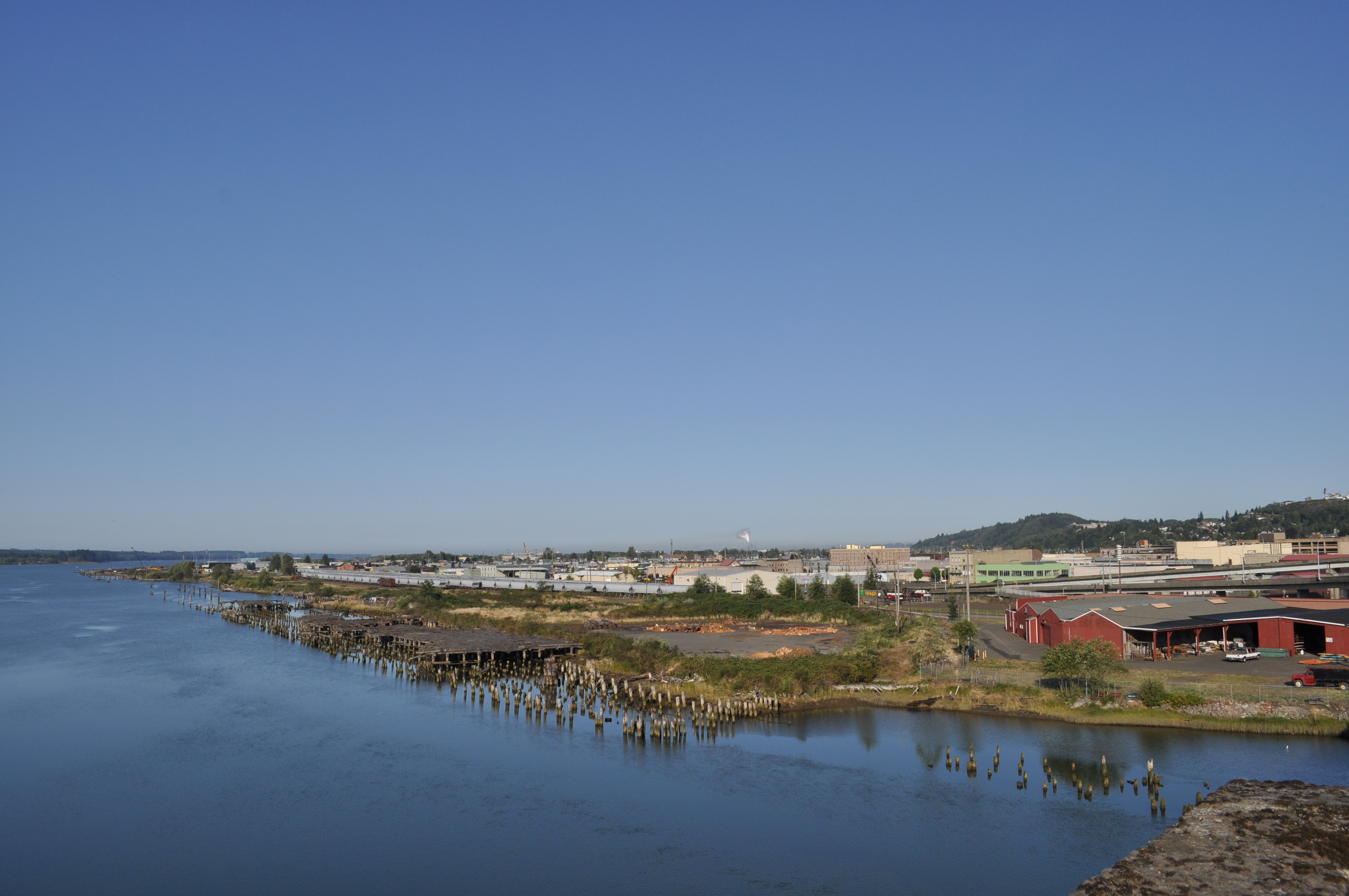
View of Aberdeen, Washington, where Fixx began lifelong friendship with Robert Cantwell

Calvin Fixx was born Calvin Henry Fix in Lyman, Idaho, on August 1, 1906, the son of Henry Martin Fix (1883–1971) and Maggie Priscilla Smith Fix (1888–1958). He had two brothers, Ford and Harley, and a sister, Georgia.

He attended high school in Aberdeen, Washington, where he began a lifelong friendship with Robert Cantwell. He attended business school in Aberdeen briefly.

Cantwell and Fixx dreamed of "escaping to New York".

== Career ==
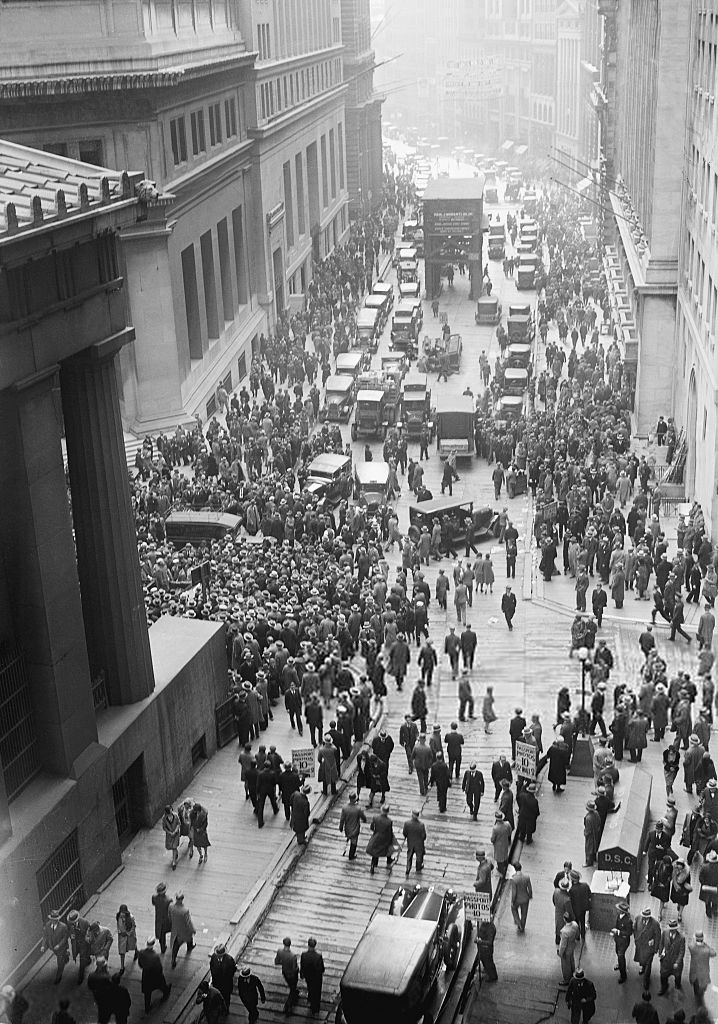
Crowd gathering at Wall Street and Broad Street after 1929 crash – the Great Depression shaped Fixx's experience in New York City

In 1927, Fixx hitchhiked cross-country to New York City. He took a part-time job in a Greenwich Village bookshop and wrote freelance book reviews. He took other jobs, such as secretary to author Lyle Saxon. At this time, he added a second "x" to his surname because, he said, "a verb cannot be a name." He began to act informally as Cantwell's agent and helped him publish his first major short story. In 1929, he encouraged Robert Cantwell to come to New York City and they shared a flat in Greenwich Village.

In 1936, he joined Time with Robert Cantwell, Robert Fitzgerald, and James Agee.

In early 1939, Fitzgerald resigned. In April 1939, Chambers was hired by Henry Luce, and Fixx joined Chambers in the Books section. In 1940, William Saroyan lists Fixx among "contributing editors" at Time in Saroyan's play, Love's Old Sweet Song.

In October 1942, while working in Time's "Back of the Book" section with Chambers, Fixx suffered a "severe heart attack", most probably brought on by the routine he and Chambers had adopted of "work[ing] a day and a half nonstop, stimulating themselves with six packs of cigarettes and a continual stream of coffee". Luce gave him a year's leave and salary to recover. (Wilder Hobson succeeded Fixx as assistant editor of Books.) Chambers also suffered a heart attack a month later and also went on leave. (Allen Weinstein notes that the FBI had visited Chambers in May 1942 to question him about his communist activities.)

Upon Fixx's return, in 1943, he gave up editorial work for "special projects" (as did Chambers). He also worked in the public relations department.

== Personal life and death ==
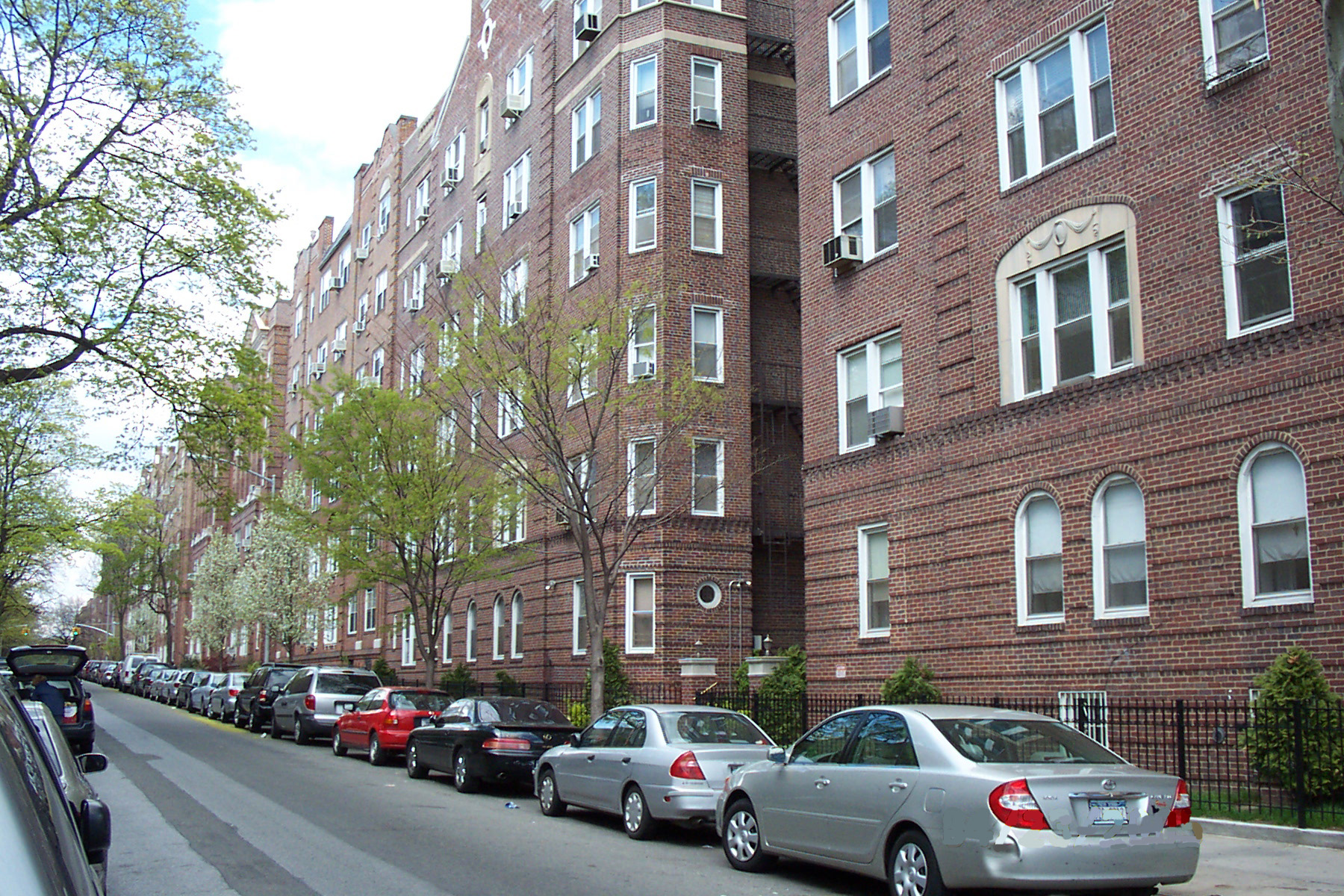
Residential street in Jackson Heights, Queens, where Fixx lived much of his life

On October 31, 1930, Fixx married Marlys Virginia Fuller (1906–2004) of Detroit, Michigan, a graduate of the 1929 class at Northwestern University. They lived at 3328 81 Street, Jackson Heights, Queens, New York.

According to Robert Fitzgerald, Fixx was a Mormon. Fixx's wife Marlys was Anglican. After his death, she worked at Oberlin College as house mother/director of May Cottage. When son Jim Fixx died, he left his estate to her, worth several million dollars.

Calvin Fixx died age 43 on March 3, 1950, of a second heart attack, in an Atlantic City hospital. Surviving him were his wife, both parents, son James, daughter Catherine, brothers Ford and Harley, and sister Georgia. His son, Jim Fixx, would also die of a heart attack, at the age of 52 in 1984.

Fixx is buried in Carmel, New York, in the Loudonsville Cemetery, in Putnam County, New York.

== Impact ==
=== T.S. Matthews staff ===
Map of the Spanish Civil War (1936–39)–the event that epitomized the radicalism of Fixx, Cantwell, and their generation

Fixx, close colleagues, and many staff members as of the 1930s helped elevate Time–"interstitial intellectuals", as historian Robert Vanderlan has called them.

Colleague and best-selling author John Hersey described them as follows:

Time was in an interesting phase; an editor named Tom Matthews had gathered a brilliant group of writers, including James Agee, Robert Fitzgerald, Whittaker Chambers, Robert Cantwell, Louis Kronenberger, and Calvin Fixx ... They were dazzling. Time's style was still very hokey—"backward ran sentences till reeled the mind"—but I could tell, even as a neophyte, who had written each of the pieces in the magazine, because each of these writers had such a distinctive voice.

=== Colleagues ===
Fixx's death at age 43 profoundly affected his close friends. His death helped take away all motivation in Cantwell to write. In his memoir, Chambers described Fixx as "my closest friend at Time. Chambers recorded the death in a letter to another friend:

This morning, at 7 o'clock, died the friend who knew most about me, a man on whom I built an absolute trust, and to whose wisdom, patience, courage, and humility I constantly repaired–Calvin Fixx.

Chambers took his son John to Fixx's funeral.

Fixx was in charge of novelist Sloan Wilson when Wilson joined Time.

=== Communism and the Hiss case ===
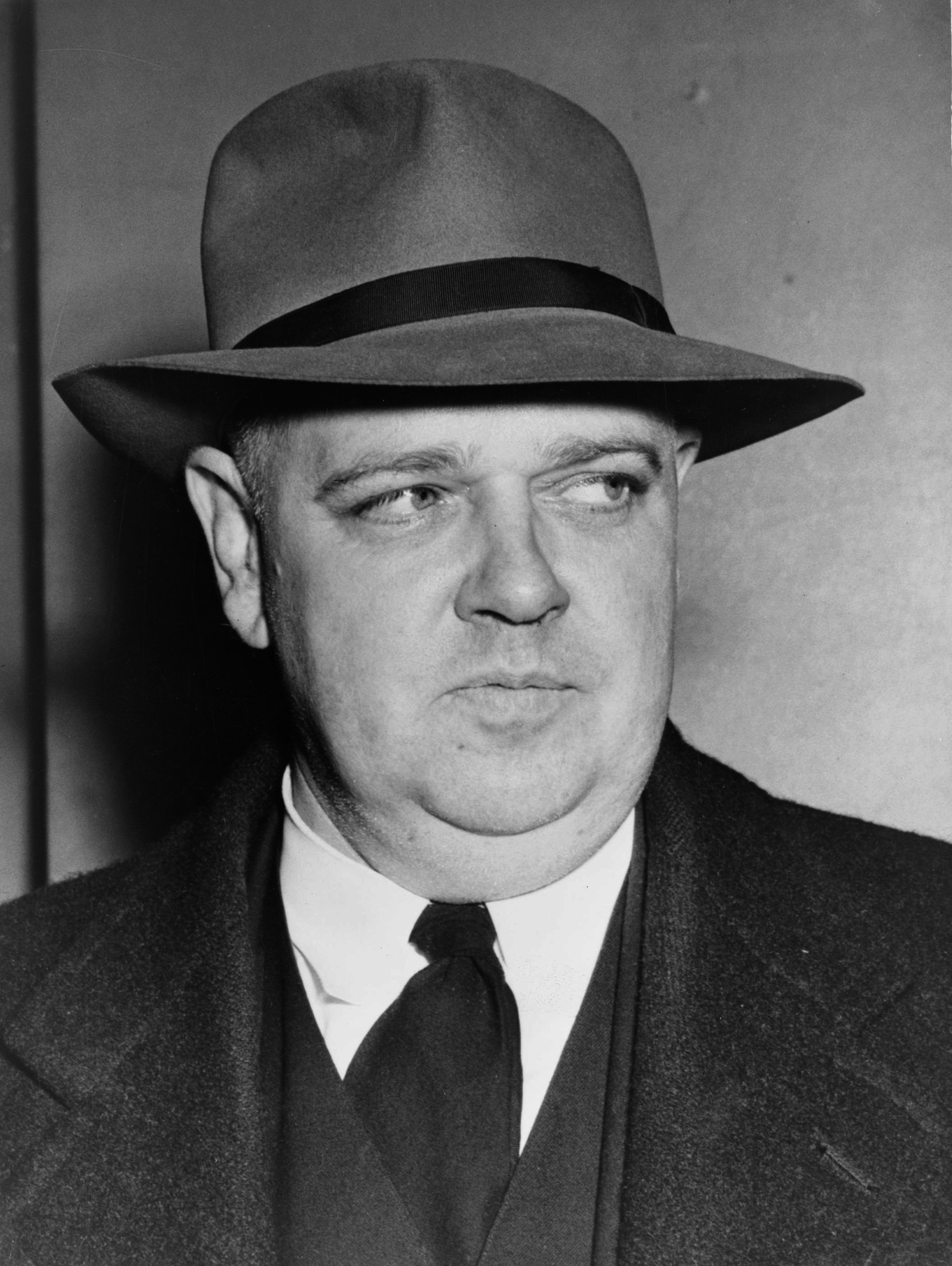
Whittaker Chambers joined Robert Cantwell as close friend of Fixx's during their years at Time

In the 1930s during the popular front years, Fixx was either a member of the Communist Party USA or supportive of Marxism. By 1939 with the Hitler-Stalin Pact, he started toward anti-communism, following Cantwell and Chambers.

In 1939, the triumvirate (Fixx, Cantwell, Chambers) challenged the communist-controlled Time chapter of the Newspaper Guild by making a motion to send aid to Loyalists (Republicans) in the Spanish Civil War at a time, following the Hitler-Stalin Pact, communists supported Nationalist (Falangists): they were defeated 42 to 3.

During the first months of the Alger Hiss case (1948–1950), Chambers, feeling unable to face Time offices, used to spend much time at Fixx's home.

Supporters of Hiss used Fixx's 1942 heart attack and 1950 death to criticize his 1942 supervisor Whittaker Chambers. Ardent Hiss supporter Meyer Zeligs elaborated how Chambers "drew [Fixx] into the orbit of this killing [work] schedule".

David Cort rewrote his own account:

A ghoulish episode occurred, instigated by that plausible Cagliostro on Time magazine, Whittaker Chambers. His totally unnecessary routine of working his foreign department through every night on black coffee reduced one willing colleague, Calvin Fixx, to a heart attack.

Subsequent writers repeated this charge, often near-verbatim from Cort.

== Works ==
Time did not give bylines during Fixx's tenure, but he also published elsewhere, including these in The New Republic:

- "King Cole by W.R. Burnett" (1936)
- "The House of Tavelinck by Jo van Ammers-Kuller" (1938)
- "Dynasty of Death by Taylor Caldwell" (1938)
- "Meek Heritage by F.E. Sillanpaa" (1938)
- "Horns for our Adornment by Aksel Sandemose" (1938)
- "The Monument by Pamela Hansford Johnson" (1938)

== See also ==
- Robert Cantwell
- Whittaker Chambers
- Robert Fitzgerald
- James Agee
- Wilder Hobson

== External sources ==
- "Calvin Fixx". The New York Times. 4 March 1950.
- "Calvin Henry Fixx". Find A Grave.
- Find A Grave: Marlys Virginia Fuller Fixx
