= Wilder Hobson =

American journalist

- Born: Wilder Hobson; February 18, 1906; New York City, New York; United States
- Died: May 1, 1964 (aged 58); Princeton, New Jersey; United States
- Education: Yale University
- Occupations: Writer, magazine editor
- Employer(s): Time (1930s-1940s); Fortune (1940s); Harper's Bazaar (1950s); Newsweek (1960s); Saturday Review (1940s, 1950s, 1960s)
- Board member of: Planning committee of the Institute of Jazz Studies
- Spouse(s): Peggy Hobson; Verna Harrison Hobson (married 1945-1964)

Wilder Hobson (February 18, 1906 – May 1, 1964) was an American writer and editor for Time (1930s-1940s), Fortune (1940s), Harper's Bazaar (1950s), and Newsweek (1960s) magazines. He was also a competent musician (trombone), author of a history of American jazz, and long-time contributor to Saturday Review (1940s, 1950s, 1960s) magazine. Also, he served on the planning committee of the Institute of Jazz Studies.

== Life ==
=== Early years ===
Born in 1906, Hobson attended Yale University. There, he was a roommate of Dwight Macdonald, with whom he produced campus humor magazine The Yale Record. He was a 1928 member of Scroll and Key.

Famed American documentary photographer Walker Evans captured Hobson and Agee on a Long Island beach during the summer of 1937, when Evans and Agee were visiting Hobson and his first wife Peggy. (The Metropolitan Museum of Art houses those photos, which are also available online—see "Images," below.)

=== Magazines ===
Hobson wrote for Time in the 1930s and 1940s. After covering a coal strike during the 1930s, he helped lead unionization at Time and became the first head of Time's Newspaper Guild branch.

In October 1942, Hobson succeeded the late Calvin Fixx as assistant editor to Whittaker Chambers, then editor of Arts & Entertainment. Other writers working for Chambers included: novelist Nigel Dennis, future New York Times Book Review editor Harvey Breit, and poets Howard Moss and Weldon Kees. Hobson worked amidst the struggle between Soviet-sympathizing and anti-Communist staffers at Time. Chambers and Willi Schlamm led the anti-Communist camp (and both later joined the founding editorial board of William F. Buckley, Jr.'s National Review). Theodore H. White and Richard Lauterbach led the pro-Soviet camp. Time founder Henry R. Luce came to support the anti-Communist camp before the end of World War II in 1945. Hobson, however, rode out the storm and even managed to write two books at Time: a historical study called American Jazz Music (1939—see "Music," below) and a novel called All Summer Long (1945).

When Chambers received a promotion to senior editor in September 1943 and then joined Time's senior editorial group in December 1932, Hobson succeeded to the Arts & Entertainment section. He hired friend Walker Evans to write reviews first on Film and then on Art (1943–1945).

In 1946, Hobson moved to editorial board of Fortune, where he worked until severe writer's block caused him to resign.

In November 1950, Hobson became managing editor of Harper's Bazaar (then with a circulation of 340,605), replacing Frances MacFadden, who retired after 18 years in that position.

Later, Hobson joined Newsweek, where he worked for a decade.

Hobson become a contributor to the (now defunct) Saturday Review during the late 1940s, the 1950s, and into the 1960s.

=== Later life with Verna Hobson ===
Hobson was a heavy alcoholic and died at the age of 58 in 1964 of gastrointestinal hemorrhage in Princeton, New Jersey.

Hobson married his second wife, Verna Harrison (1923–2004), in the mid-1940s after meeting at Time. At first they lived in Manhattan but moved to Princeton. Each year, they summered on Squirrel Island, Maine while playing in the Hennessy Five Star Orchestra. Mrs. Hobson worked 1954–1966 as secretary to Robert Oppenheimer, then director of the Institute for Advanced Study. After her husband's death in 1964, she moved to London and worked first for the American Association of University Women and then for the London branch of Robert Matthew, Johnson-Marshall, architects. In 1976, she returned to America and settled in New Gloucester, Maine, working for the independent weekly New Gloucester News and also helping to re-establish The Squirrel Island Squid. In 1998, she became a photographic stringer for The Lewiston Sun. In 2001, she moved to New Rochelle, New York, to live with her son Archie's family. Verna Harrison Hobson died on April 13, 2004.

=== Music ===
In 1939, Hobson became the second American to write a major book on jazz, American Jazz Music ( A year earlier, colleague Winthrop Sargeant, a staff writer at Life, had published Jazz—Hot and Hybrid). Sargeant believed that the "swing" in jazz derived from complex African multi-rhythms adapted to relatively simple Western music. Hobson and Sargeant—both amateur, though well informed, jazz enthusiasts—believed that jazz came from New Orleans bordellos, whereas in the 1930s European scholars like Robert Goffin of Belgium and Hugues Panassié of France had already ascribed (correctly) that jazz was a "vernacular-based art."

Wilder's close ancestors were Maine "Downeasters" and he played summers on Squirrel Island in Southport with the Hennessy Five-Star Orchestra, which slide-trombonist Wilder joined in 1921 at age 15. Wilder's second wife Verna later became a tuba player. Family members still return, where, as of 2001, the Hennessy band was "still alive and well." Daughter Eliza Hobson became a jazz disc jockey and broadcast journalist as well as playing piano and guitar. A biography of Time colleague Weldon Kees includes a reminiscence of Kees on piano and Hobson on trombone in the Greenwich Village home of James Agee's sister.

== Publications ==
=== Books ===
- American Jazz Music. (NY: W.W. Norton, 1939, republished in 1941 and 1976)
- All Summer Long. (New York: Duell, Sloan & Pearce, 1945) (review in Time)

=== Articles ===
- "Hobson on Jazz," Time, April 10, 1939
- "Clarinetist's Progress," Time, April 17, 1939
- "An Album of Chinese Paintings," Life, October 11, 1943, 7 pp
- "The Business Suit - A short and possibly tactless essay on the costuming of American enterprise," Fortune, July 1948, illustrated by Bernarda Bryson
- "The Gospel Truth," Down Beat, May 30, 1968. vol. 35, p. 19. (posthumous)

=== Photos ===
- Metropolitan Museum of Art - photos of Wilder Hobson by Walker Evans in 1937
- "Wilder Hobson as part of the Hennessy Five Star Orchestra on Squirrel Island in Booth Bay Harbor, Maine". The Portsmouth Herald. January 6, 2001.

== Sources ==
- Herzstein, Robert E. Henry R. Luce, Time, and the American Crusade in Asia (New York: Cambridge University Press, 2005). ISBN 978-0-521-83577-0
- Rathbone, Belinda. Walker Evans: A Biography (Boston: Houghton Mifflin Books, 1995). ISBN 978-0-618-05672-9
- Reidel, James. Vanished Act: The Life and Art of Weldon Kees. (University of Nebraska Press, 2007). ISBN 978-0-8032-5977-5
- Tanenhaus, Sam. Whittaker Chambers: A Biography (New York: Random House, 1997). ISBN 978-0-394-58559-8.
- Down Beat magazine
