= The Complete Book of Running =

1977 nonfiction book by Jim Fixx

- First edition
- Author: Jim Fixx
- Language: English
- Genre: Non-fiction
- Publisher: Random House
- Publication date: 1977
- Publication place: United States
- ISBN: 0394411595

The Complete Book of Running is a 1977 non-fiction book written by Jim Fixx.

== Overview ==
The book discusses not only the physical benefits of running, but its psychological benefits as well: increasing self-esteem, acquiring a "high" from running, and being able to cope better with pressure and tension.

== Author ==
Jim Fixx was the author of the 1977 best-seller The Complete Book of Running, which sold over one million copies. Fixx is credited with popularizing the sport of running and contributing to the 1970s running boom through regular media appearances that touted the health benefits of exercise. Predisposed to heart problems, Fixx died at age 52 of a heart attack after his daily run, which opened up discussion about the links between running, health, and life expectancy.
