= Stephen Citron =

American songwriter

- Born: February 10, 1924
- Died: March 5, 2013; Los Angeles?
- Occupations: Biographer; critic; songwriter
- Spouse: Anne Edwards

Stephen Citron (1924-2013) was a graduate of the Juilliard School and a writer of songs performed by the likes of Liza Minnelli, Dory Previn, and Édith Piaf. He was married to the writer and fellow avid amateur cook, Anne Edwards.

He has written biography or criticism about Noël Coward, Cole Porter, Stephen Sondheim, Andrew Lloyd Webber, Vivien Leigh, Edgar Allan Poe, Queen Elizabeth II, Princess Margaret, Oscar Hammerstein II, Alan Jay Lerner, and Jerry Herman.

In addition from teaching songcraft in a Carnegie Hall studio, he also wrote books about the creation of music and musicals.

== See also ==
- Mr. Blandings Builds His Dream House
