= Anne Edwards =

American author (1927–2024)

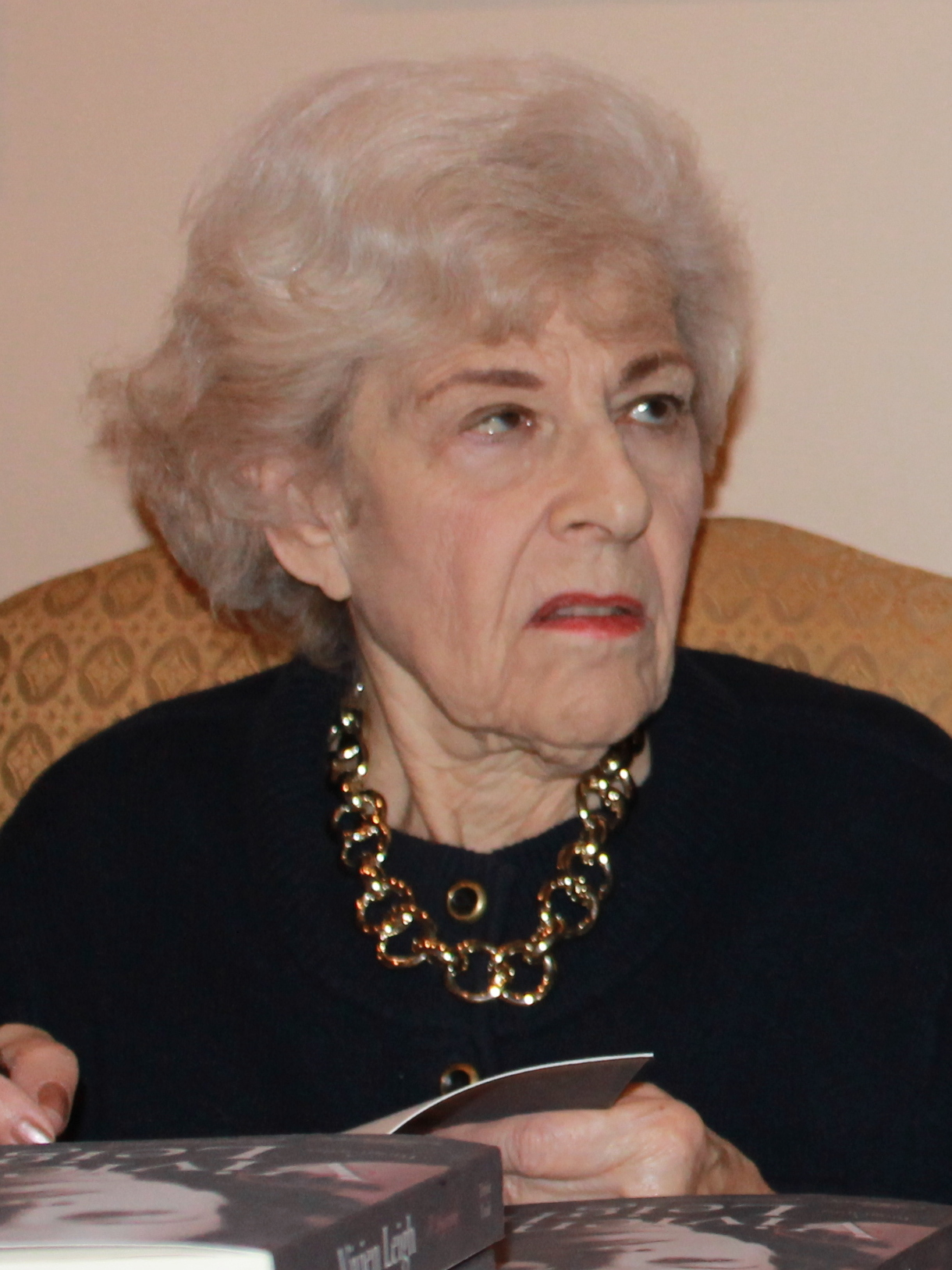
- Edwards in 2013
- Born: August 20, 1927 Port Chester, New York, U.S.
- Died: January 20, 2024 (aged 96) Beverly Hills, California, U.S.
- Occupation: Author, biographer
- Genre: Entertainment Business Celebrities; Fiction; Children's Books
- Children: Catherine Edwards Sadler; Michael Edwards

Anne Edwards (August 20, 1927 – January 20, 2024) was an American writer best known for her biographies, including those of celebrities such as Maria Callas, Judy Garland, Katharine Hepburn, Vivien Leigh, Margaret Mitchell, Ronald Reagan, Barbra Streisand, Shirley Temple and royalty including Queen Mary, Queen Elizabeth II, Princess Margaret, Princess Diana and Countess Sonya Tolstoy.

== Early life and education ==
Anne Louise Josephson was born on August 20, 1927, in Port Chester, New York, to Milton and Marian (Fish) Josephson. Her father was a traveling clothes salesman and her mother was a homemaker. The family moved to Los Angeles in 1932, where Edwards started as a child actor on radio and the stage, performing with the Meglin Kiddies and the Gus Edwards troupe. In 1944, at age 17, she was hired by MGM Studios, becoming the youngest writer for the studio, where she earned $150 a week. Edwards attended the University of California, Los Angeles during the 1945–1946 school year, and also studied at Southern Methodist University from 1947 to 1948. In 1949, at age 22, she sold her first screenplay, the film Quantez, which starred Fred MacMurray and Dorothy Malone.

== Career ==
Her early film credits include; A Question of Adultery starring Julie London and Anthony Steel; and co-writing the first draft of the screenplay for the film Funny Girl starring Barbra Streisand. She wrote her first novel, The Survivors, in 1968 and subsequently wrote eight novels, sixteen biographies, three children's books, and two memoirs (one with her late husband Stephen Citron). In 1975, she wrote her first celebrity biography, Judy Garland: A Biography, and her 1990 biography of Ronald Reagan, Early Reagan: The Rise to Power, was nominated for a Pulitzer Prize.

In the mid-1970s, Edwards was hired by the Zanuck-Brown Company to write a story that could be adapted as a film sequel to Gone with the Wind. She wrote a well–researched novel, which in the end was not used for the sequel and was itself never published. It was through working on this novel that she decided to write her biography of Margaret Mitchell.

Edwards was a past president of the Authors Guild and served on its board of directors. Her collection of literary manuscripts, papers, and related materials is now part of the Special Collections Department of the Charles E. Young Research Library at UCLA, where she had taught writing.

In an interview for Publishers Weekly, Edwards said, "An idea hits me, then I develop the story or, in the case of a biography, think of a person who exemplifies that theme. Vivien [Leigh], Judy [Garland] and Sonya [Tolstoy] were vastly interesting people and symbolic of certain things: Judy, the exploitation of a woman; Vivien, somebody who suffered from manic-depression; Sonya, an intelligent woman subjugated to a man who used her, drained her, made a villain of her."

== Personal life ==
Edwards was married three times. Her first husband, whom she married in 1947, was Harvey Wishner, nephew of screenwriter, producer, and director Robert Rossen. Her second marriage was to film producer Leon Becker, and her third marriage was to pianist and composer Stephen Citron, who died in 2013. In the 1950s, she moved overseas, where she lived as an expatriate in England, Switzerland and France. According to her autobiography, Leaving Home: A Hollywood Writer's Years Abroad, the reason for her leaving the United States was because she was on the master blacklist of the House Un-American Activities Committee, whose goal was to "wipe out progressives and unionists in the film business and all socially critical picture-making." While living in London, she crossed paths several times with Judy Garland, who was the subject of her first celebrity biography. Ironically, the pair had first met when they were children, having been represented by the same talent agency representing child actors.

In 1973, she returned to the States, where she resided in Massachusetts, Connecticut and New York before finally returning to Beverly Hills. Edwards died in Beverly Hills, California, on January 20, 2024, at the age of 96.

== Bibliography ==
=== Biographies ===
- 1975: Judy Garland: A Biography (Simon & Schuster)
- 1977: Vivien Leigh: A Biography (Simon & Schuster)
- 1981: Sonya: The Life of Countess Tolstoy (Simon & Schuster)
- 1983: Road to Tara: Life of Margaret Mitchell (Hodder & Stoughton)
- 1984: Matriarch: Queen Mary and the House of Windsor (William Morrow and Company)
- 1985: A Remarkable Woman: A Biography of Katharine Hepburn (Morrow)
- 1988: The DeMilles: An American Family (Harry N. Abrams)
- 1988: Shirley Temple: American Princess (Morrow)
- 1990: Early Reagan: The Rise to Power (Morrow)
- 1990: Royal Sisters: Queen Elizabeth II and Princess Margaret (Morrow)
- 1992: The Grimaldis of Monaco: Centuries of Scandal/Years of Grace (Morrow)
- 1995: Throne of Gold: The Lives of the Aga Khans (Morrow)
- 1997: Streisand: A Biography (Little, Brown)
- 1997: Diana: The Life She Led (St. Martin's Press)
- 2001: Maria Callas: An Intimate Biography (St. Martin's Press)
- 2003: The Reagans: Portrait of a Marriage (St. Martin's Press)

=== Novels ===
- 1968: The Survivors (Holt Rinehart Winston)
- 1970: Miklos Alexandrovitch Is Missing (Coward-McCann)
- 1971: Shadow Of A Lion (Coward, McCann & Geoghegan)
- 1972: Haunted Summer (Bantam Books)
- 1974: The Hesitant Heart (Random House)
- 1975: Child of Night (Random House)
- 1991: Wallis: The Novel (Morrow)
- 1996: La Divina (Mandarin Publishing)

=== Autobiography ===
- 1976 The Inn and Us (Random House), co-authored with husband Stephen Citron
- 2011: "Scarlett and Me" (The Marietta Gone with the Wind Museum)
- 2012: Leaving Home (Scarecrow Press)

=== Children's books ===
- 1977: P. T. Barnum (Putnam)
- 1977: The Great Houdini (Putnam)
- 1987: A Child's Bible (Topeka Bindery), co-authored with Shirley Steen
