= H. C. Potter =

American director

- Born: November 13, 1904; New York City, New York, U.S.
- Died: August 31, 1977 (aged 72); Southampton, New York, U.S.
- Education: Yale University (BA, MFA)
- Occupations: Film director, theatre director, theatre producer

Henry Codman Potter (sometimes II or Jr.; November 13, 1904 – August 31, 1977) was an American theatrical producer and director as well as film director.

== Biography ==
H.C. Potter was born in New York City, the grandson of the Right Rev. Henry Codman Potter, Episcopal bishop of New York, and great-grandson of Alonzo Potter. He attended St. Marks School and graduated from Yale University in 1926, where he was a member of the Yale Dramatic Association and Scroll and Key. He attended the Yale School of Drama in the era of George Pierce Baker, and with George Haight founded the Hampton Players, one of the early summer theaters in America, based in Southampton, Long Island from 1927 to 1933. With Haight as producer, he directed numerous Broadway productions, then moved to Hollywood, where he directed over 20 feature films, earning a reputation as a specialist in "gag" comedy.

The films he directed include Beloved Enemy (1936), Wings Over Honolulu (1937), Romance in the Dark, The Cowboy and the Lady, and The Shopworn Angel (1938), The Adventures of Tom Sawyer (1938), The Story of Vernon and Irene Castle and Blackmail (1939), Congo Maisie and Second Chorus (1940), Hellzapoppin' (1941), Victory Through Air Power (documentary) and Mr. Lucky (1943), The Farmer's Daughter and A Likely Story (1947), You Gotta Stay Happy, Mr. Blandings Builds His Dream House and The Time of Your Life (1948), The Miniver Story (1950), Three for the Show (1955) and Top Secret Affair (1957).

An avid private pilot, he served during World War II as superintendent of operations at Falcon Field near Phoenix, Arizona, training Royal Air Force pilots, and later as captain in the Air Transport Command, ferrying cargo in small planes to military bases throughout California. His postwar film career was impeded by a contract with RKO, then controlled and virtually brought to a halt by the eccentric policies of its owner Howard Hughes.

In 1958, he retired from film work and moved to New York City, where he opened a stage production office with Richard Meyers, and pursued his hobby of training Labrador retrievers for field trials.

On February 8, 1960, H.C. Potter's name was placed in the Hollywood Walk of Fame. His star is located at 6633 Hollywood Blvd.

Retirement afforded Potter the opportunity to indulge his passion for writing scholarly monographs about Sherlock Holmes for The Baker Street Journal. In 1971 he was awarded membership in The Baker Street Irregulars, the New York-based organization that keeps green the memory of Sherlock Holmes. Potter was granted the investiture "The Final Problem".

In addition, Potter twice won the Morley-Montgomery Award, one of the highest distinctions given by the BSI, for his articles "Reflections on Canonical Vehicles and Something of the Horse" (1971) and '"John H. Watson, Word Painter" (1976).

Potter married Lucilla Annie Wylie in 1926. Their three sons were Daniel J. Potter, M.D., Robert A. Potter, Ph.D., and Earl Wylie Potter, Esq. H.C. Potter died in Southampton, New York on August 31, 1977.

== Selected filmography ==
- Beloved Enemy (1936)
- The Shopworn Angel (1938)
- Blackmail (1939)
- The Story of Vernon and Irene Castle (1939)
- Second Chorus (1940)
- Hellzapoppin' (1941)
- Victory Through Air Power (1943)
- Mr. Lucky (1943)
- The Farmer's Daughter (1947)
- The Time of Your Life (1948)
- Mr. Blandings Builds His Dream House (1948)
- The Miniver Story (1950)
