= Rebecca Gibel =

American actress

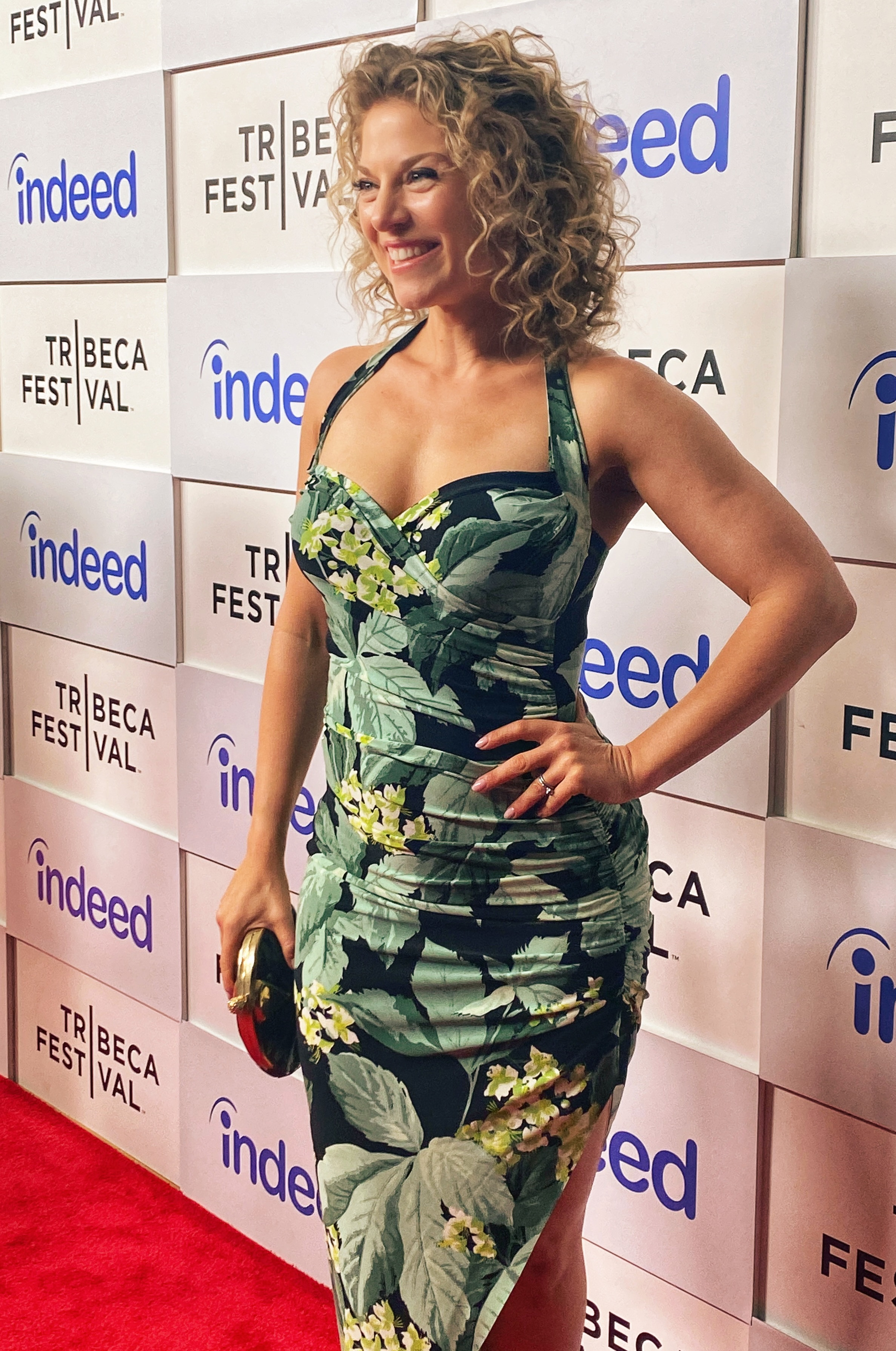
- Citizenship: American
- Education: College of William & Mary (BA); Brown University (MFA)
- Occupation: Actress
- Spouse: Charlie Thurston (m.2015)

Rebecca Gibel is an American film, television and stage actress.

== Career ==
Gibel is a member of the Resident Acting Company at Trinity Repertory Company in Providence, RI. She earned her B.A. in Theatre from The College of William & Mary. She earned her MFA in Acting from Brown University. At Brown, Gibel appeared as Ado Annie in a reimagined Oklahoma, directed by Richard Jenkins and Sharon Jenkins, and designed by Eugene Lee; as well as the World Premiere Sarah Ruhl's Melancholy Play: a chamber musical, with music by Todd Almond, directed by Liesl Tommy, and designed by Clint Ramos.

In 2017, she played K.T. in the US transfer of Maria Friedman's Merrily We Roll Along at the Huntington Theatre Company, opposite Eden Espinoza, Damian Humbley, and Mark Umbers.

Gibel made her television debut in a 2012 episode of Blue Bloods. In 2019, she recurred opposite Ashleigh Cummings on AMC's NOS4A2 as Tina Harrison.

In 2021, Gibel played Joanne Biles in CODA, which swept the awards at the 2021 Sundance Film Festival, won the 2022 Oscar for Best Picture, and the 2022 SAG Award for Outstanding Performance By A Cast In A Motion Picture.

From 2021 to 2022, she starred opposite Ed Burns in seasons 1 and 2 of Bridge and Tunnel, as Burns' wife, Kitty Farrell. She also appeared opposite Leonardo DiCaprio, Rob Morgan and Jennifer Lawrence in Adam McKay's Academy Award-nominated feature film, Don't Look Up.

In 2023, Gibel played Paulette, opposite Jenna Ortega, in the Paramount+ film Finestkind, written and directed by Academy Award winner Brian Helgeland.

== Personal life ==
Gibel is married to actor Charlie Thurston, who she met during college at Brown University.

== Filmography ==
=== Film ===
Year	Title	Role	Notes
2006	The Shadow Walkers	Emily	
2018	American Woman	Nursing Assistant #1	
2020	Spenser Confidential	Laurie Boylan	
2021	CODA	Joanne Biles	
2021	Don't Look Up	Waitress	
2023	Finestkind	Paulette	
2024	Salem's Lot	Mabel Werts	

=== Television ===
Year	Title	Role	Notes
2012	Blue Bloods	Beatrice	Episode: "The Uniform"
2019	NOS4A2	Tina Harrison	Recurring Cast: Season 1
2019	Love in NY	Newscaster #3	Episode: "It's Not You"
2019	Law & Order: Special Victims Unit	Corp. Counsel Hayley Brogan	Episode: "The Burden of Our Choices"
2019	Castle Rock	Julie	Episode: "New Jerusalem"
2020	The Plot Against America	Louise Swig	Episode: "Part 1"
2020	Defending Jacob	Wendy	Episode: "Pilot"
2020	Across the Pacific	Ione Wright	Episode: "Another Ocean"
2021-22	Bridge and Tunnel	Kitty Farrell	Recurring Cast
