= Diego Luri =

Brazilian actor and singer (born 1985)

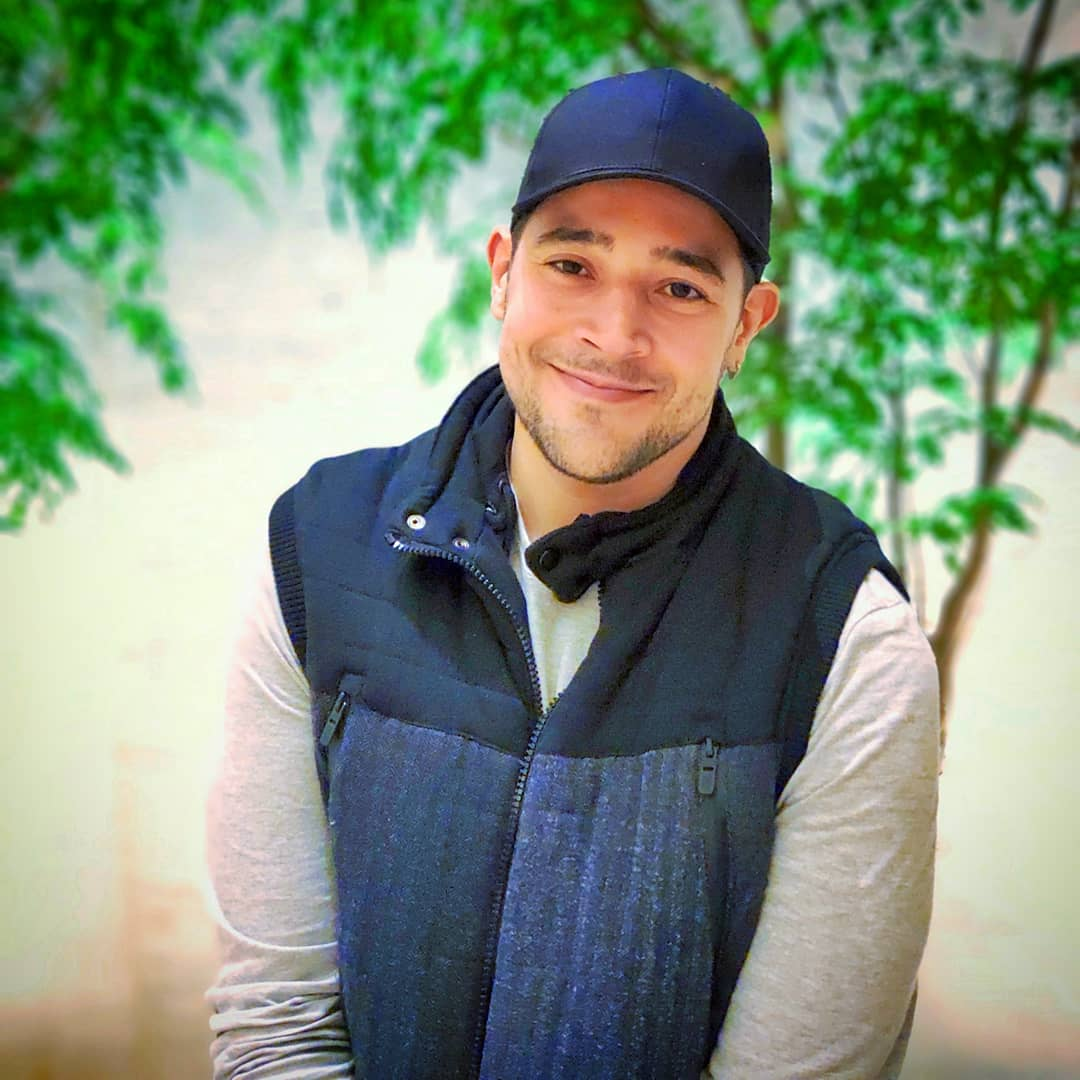
- Born: September 27, 1985 (age 40); Rio de Janeiro, Brazil
- Education: Universidade Gama Filho; Universidade Cruzeiro do Sul
- Occupations: Actor, singer, journalist, writer
- Years active: 2011–present

Diego Luri (born September 27, 1985) is a Brazilian actor, singer, journalist and writer, who gained prominence by playing the protagonist of the Brazilian version of the show Shrek the Musical. For his performance, he was nominated for the Bibi Ferreira Award in 2014. He was also in the Brazilian cast of other musical theater shows, such as Summer: The Donna Summer Musical, Beauty and the Beast, Cinderella, The Phantom of the Opera, Romeo and Juliet – to the sound of Marisa Monte, Rodgers & Hammerstein's Cinderella, The Fantasticks, My Fair Lady, Sister Act, Os Saltimbancos Trapalhões – O Musical and Porquinhos – O Musical.

== Early life and career ==
Luri was and raised in the Rio de Janeiro neighborhood of Campo Grande. He studied journalism, and in 2009, he presented the TV show Vida e Missão, broadcast by Band Rio and later by CNT. He was also a web reporter for Rede TV and, still working as a reporter, began his artistic training as an actor at Casa das Artes de Laranjeiras (CAL). He was part of the vocal group Réus Confessos, along with other musical theater artists. In 2011, he received the award for Best Supporting Actor at the Rio de Janeiro City Theater Festival for Beauty and the Beast. His first major role was in the Broadway show Shrek – O Musical, in its Brazilian production, which ran in the cities of Rio de Janeiro and São Paulo and toured throughout 2014. For his performance as the protagonist of the show, he was nominated for the Bibi Ferreira Award in the Breakthrough Actor category.

=== Shrek – The Musical ===
In 2012 Luri was selected from more than 2,000 candidates to play the protagonist of the show Shrek – The Musical in Brazil.

His costume weighed over 20 kg and his makeup took three hours to apply. His performance received good reviews.

== Stage credits ==
Year	Title	Role	Notes
2021	Summer: The Donna Summer Musical	Bruce Sudano	Teatro Santander (São Paulo)
2020–2021	Beauty and the Beast	Beast	Teatro Bradesco (São Paulo) and Teatro Claro (São Paulo)
2021	Cinderella	Prince Henry	Teatro Bradesco (São Paulo)
2018–2019	The Phantom of the Opera	Monsieur Andre (understudy) and swing	Teatro Renault (São Paulo)
2018	Romeo and Juliet – to the sound of Marisa Monte	Count Paris	Teatro Riachuelo (Rio de Janeiro) and Teatro Frei Caneca (São Paulo)
2017	Rodgers & Hamerstein's Cinderella	Jean Michel	National Tour
2017	The Fantasticks	El Gallo	Teatro Extra Itaim (São Paulo)
2016	My Fair Lady	Zoltan Karpathy	Teatro Santander (São Paulo)
2016	Rodgers & Hamerstein's Cinderella	Ensemble	Teatro Alfa (São Paulo)
2015	Sister Act	Joey (understudy) and ensemble	Teatro Renault (São Paulo)
2014	Os Saltimbancos Trapalhões – O Musical	Ogro and Pajé	Cidade das Artes (Rio de Janeiro)
2012–2014	Shrek – The Musical	Shrek	Teatro João Caetano (Rio de Janeiro), Teatro Bradesco (São Paulo) and National Tour
2011	Porquinhos – O Musical	Narrador	Teatro Vannucci (Rio de Janeiro)

== Books ==
- Caos Entre Nós ou A Tragédia do Hábito / Uma Canção Pra Você (2017)
- Contos e Crônicas para Crianças (2011)
