= Shrek the Musical =

2008 musical by Jeanine Tesori & David Lindsay-Abraire

Shrek
- the Musical
- Broadway Playbill cover
- Music: Jeanine Tesori
- Lyrics: David Lindsay-Abaire
- Book: David Lindsay-Abaire
- Basis: DreamWorks Animation's Shrek by Ted Elliott, Terry Rossio, Joe Stillman, and Roger S. H. Schulman and Shrek! by William Steig
- Premiere: December 14, 2008: Broadway Theatre (53rd Street), New York City
- Productions: 2008 Seattle; 2008 Broadway; 2010 US tour 2011 West End; 2014 UK tour 2023 UK Tour

Shrek the Musical is a musical with music by Jeanine Tesori and book and lyrics by David Lindsay-Abaire. It is based on the 2001 DreamWorks Animation film Shrek, along with elements of its sequels: Shrek 2, Shrek Forever After and William Steig's 1990 book Shrek!. After a trial run in Seattle, the original Broadway production opened in December 2008 and closed after a run of over 12 months in January 2010. It was followed by a tour of the United States which opened in 2010, and a re-vamped West End production from June 2011 to February 2013.

A high definition filming of the Broadway production, shot by RadicalMedia, was released on DVD, Blu-ray, and digital download on October 15, 2013, in North America and December 2, 2013, in the United Kingdom. The digital version of the film was made available to stream beginning in December 2013.

== History ==
=== Development ===
Lindsay-Abaire and Jason Moore (director) began working on the show in 2002, with Tesori joining the team from 2004. A reading took place on August 10, 2007, with Stephen Kramer Glickman in the role of Shrek, Celia Keenan-Bolger as Princess Fiona, Robert L. Daye Jr. as Donkey and Christopher Sieber as Lord Farquaad.

=== Seattle premiere (2008) ===
The musical premiered in an out-of-town tryout at the 5th Avenue Theatre in Seattle. Previews began August 14, 2008, with an opening night of September 10. The tryout ran through September 21, and played to generally favorable reviews, being cited as one of the few movie-to-stage adaptations "with heart". The principal cast included Brian d'Arcy James as Shrek, Sutton Foster as Princess Fiona, Sieber as Lord Farquaad, Chester Gregory II as Donkey, John Tartaglia as Pinocchio and Kecia Lewis-Evans as the Dragon.

During previews, "I Could Get Used to This" was replaced by "Don't Let Me Go," and "Let Her In" became "Make a Move". Also during previews, a brief reprise of "Who I'd Be" was sung after Shrek overhears Fiona's misleading comment about being with a hideous beast, which led into "Build a Wall". This was cut and "Build a Wall" was placed after "Morning Person (Reprise)". "Build a Wall" was later cut during previews, but re-instated towards the end of the run.

=== Broadway production (2008–10) ===
After extensive changes were made, the show began previews on Broadway at the Broadway Theatre on November 8, 2008, with the official opening on December 14. The cast included d'Arcy James as Shrek, Foster as Fiona, Sieber as Farquaad and Tartaglia as Pinocchio. Daniel Breaker took over the role of Donkey, as the creative team thought Chester Gregory II did not fit the part. The Dragon was voiced by company members Haven Burton, Aymee Garcia and Rachel Stern, instead of a soloist. Kecia Lewis-Evans, who played Dragon in Seattle, was offered a part in the show's ensemble but declined. Ben Crawford was the standby for Shrek, until he replaced d'Arcy James for the final months of performances.

The song "I'm a Believer", which was originally played as the audience left the theatre, was added to the score on October 2, 2009, and sung by the entire company at the end of the performance.

The Broadway production of the show received a total of twelve Drama Desk Award and eight Tony Award nominations, including Best Musical and acting awards for d'Arcy James, Foster and Sieber. At the Tony Awards, the entire cast performed a section of "Freak Flag" for the opening number medley; later on, d'Arcy James, Foster and Breaker introduced Sieber and company, who performed "What's Up Duloc?".

The Broadway production closed on January 3, 2010, after 441 performances and 37 previews. At the time, it was one of the most expensive musicals to open on Broadway, at an estimated $25 million, and despite generally good reviews, it failed to recoup its initial investment. The show was then extremely modified for the national tour.

=== US national tours ===
A national tour of North America began previews at the Cadillac Palace Theatre in Chicago, on July 13, 2010, with opening night on July 25. Rob Ashford is the co-director, as the Broadway creative team revised changes. The production marked the debut of an all-new Dragon, voiced off-stage by a single vocalist, with four puppeteers controlling the movements of the new 25-foot puppet.. On the subject, set designer Tim Hatley stated "The biggest change [will be] the dragon. It will be a different creature from the puppet/soul trio on Broadway [but] I think we've finally gotten it right". The tour also features a new opening, new songs and improved illusions, from those on Broadway.

Many changes made for the tour include a new song sung by the dragon entitled "Forever", replacing "Donkey Pot Pie".

The original touring cast featured Eric Petersen as Shrek, Haven Burton as Princess Fiona, Alan Mingo Jr. as Donkey, and David F.M. Vaughn as Lord Farquaad. Carrie Compere played the Dragon, with Blakely Slaybaugh as Pinocchio. Todd Buonopane was originally cast in the role of Lord Farquaad, but was replaced by Vaughn before opening. The tour played its final performance at the Pantages Theatre in Los Angeles on July 31, 2011, ahead of a non-equity tour in September.

A second tour of North America, featuring a Non-Equity cast, launched September 9, 2011, at the Capitol Theatre in Yakima, Washington. Merritt David Janes appeared as Lord Farquaad. The tour officially opened in Portland, Oregon on September 13, 2011. The tour ran in the U.S. through April 29, 2012, with the final show in Springfield, Missouri, before playing Asia.

The second non-equity tour began on October 5, 2012, in Anchorage, Alaska, ending on April 7, 2013, in Reno, Nevada.

A third non-equity tour opened on February 24, 2024, in Utica, New York. Tesori and Lindsay-Abaire revised some of the material, alongside new direction and choreography by Danny Mefford, shortening the play and taking inspiration from children's theater.

=== West End production (2011–13) ===
A newly revised scaled-down version began performances in the West End at the Theatre Royal Drury Lane, on May 6, 2011. Nigel Lindsay headlined as Shrek, Richard Blackwood as Donkey, Nigel Harman as Lord Farquaad and Amanda Holden as Princess Fiona. Landi Oshinowo played the Dragon, with Jonathan Stewart as Pinocchio. The official opening night took place on June 14, 2011. Most critics were positive about the production, and in particular praised Harman's performance, branding him "hysterically funny".

The show was nominated for a total of four awards at the 2012 Laurence Olivier Awards, including Best New Musical, Best Actor for Lindsay and Supporting Actor for Harman, as well as Best Costume Design for Tim Hatley. Harman won the award for Best Performance in a Supporting Role in a Musical for his performance as Lord Farquaad. The ensemble cast performed "Freak Flag" at the awards.

Kimberley Walsh, of UK pop group Girls Aloud, took over the role of Princess Fiona on October 5, 2011, after Holden announced her pregnancy. Dean Chisnall and Neil McDermott took over from Lindsay and Harman as Shrek and Lord Farquaad respectively on February 29, 2012. Carley Stenson later took over as Princess Fiona from May 23, 2012.

The London production of the show came to an end after 715 performances, on February 24, 2013. Producers announced their plans to tour Shrek across the UK in 2014.

=== Brazilian production (2012–2014) ===
Its professional Brazilian production premiered at November 2012 at Teatro João Caetano in Rio de Janeiro. After, it took place in São Paulo in 2013, before touring around the country. The principal characters were played by Diego Luri as Shrek, Sara Sarres (Rio) and Giulia Nadruz (São Paulo) as Princess Fiona, Rodrigo Sant´anna as Donkey, Marcel Octavio (Rio de Janeiro) and Felipe Tavolaro (São Paulo) as Lord Farquaad, Camila Braunna as the Dragon, and Lucas Drummond (Rio) and Marcelo Ferrari (São Paulo) as Pinocchio.

=== UK and Ireland tours ===
The UK and Ireland tour began at the Grand Theatre, Leeds on July 23, 2014, before touring across the UK and Ireland. Dean Chisnall repeated his West End performance as Shrek, under the direction of Nigel Harman, who originated the role of Lord Farquaad in the West End. A full company announcement was made in February 2014, with Chisnall to be joined by Legally Blonde star Faye Brookes as Princess Fiona, Gerard Carey as Lord Farquaad, Idriss Kargbo as Donkey, Candace Furbert as Dragon and Will Haswell as Pinocchio. A cast change for the tour took place July 8, 2015, with ensemble member Bronté Barbé taking over the role of Princess Fiona from Brookes. The tour concluded at The Lowry, Salford on February 20, 2016.

The UK and Ireland tour continued at the Edinburgh Playhouse in December 2017. Nigel Harman once again directed the tour which ran until January 2019. The full cast was announced in November 2017 with The X Factor star Amelia Lily and Call the Midwife actress Laura Main sharing the role of Princess Fiona, alongside Samuel Holmes as Lord Farquaad, Stefan Harri as Shrek and Marcus Ayton as Donkey.

A brand new production directed by Sam Holmes and Nick Winston and designed by Phillip Witcomb began a UK and Ireland tour starting at the Theatre Royal, Plymouth in July 2023, running until May 2024, then transferring to the Hammersmith Apollo in London in July 2024. It stars Antony Lawrence as Shrek, Joanne Clifton as Princess Fiona, James Gillan as Lord Faquaad, and Brandon Lee Sears as Donkey. Todrick Hall played Donkey during the show's engagement in London.

=== Australian tour (2020) ===
The musical had its professional Australian premiere at the Sydney Lyric at the start of the year 2020, before touring Her Majesty's Theatre in Melbourne and the Queensland Performing Arts Centre in Brisbane. The principal characters, consisting of Shrek, Princess Fiona, Donkey, Lord Farquaad, the Dragon, Pinocchio, and Gingy, are all portrayed by Ben Mingay, Lucy Durack, Nat Jobe, Todd McKenney, Caleb Vines, Marcia Hines, and Manon Gunderson-Briggs respectively at the start of this tour.

=== International productions ===
There have been various international productions which are all non-replica's of the Broadway or West End staging. Countries staging the musical are: Israel (2010), Gdynia, Poland (2011–13), Madrid, Spain (2011–12), Paris, France (2012), São Paulo, Brazil (2012), Italy (2012), Netherlands (2012), Mexico, Spain (2014), Berlin, Germany (2014–15) and Argentina (2015–16).

== Synopsis of the Broadway production ==
=== Act I ===
Two ogre parents send their seven-year-old son Shrek out of their house and into the world to make his living. They warn him that because of his looks, he will be shunned by the world, and an angry mob will be the last thing he will see before he dies. Some years later, an embittered, grown up Shrek is living contentedly alone in a swamp ("Big, Bright, Beautiful World"). However, his solitude is disrupted when a refugee caravan of fairytale creatures show up on his property. They explain of their banishment from the Kingdom of Duloc, by order of the evil Lord Farquaad, who sentenced them into penal transportation for being freaks, under penalty of death if they ever return ("Story of my Life"). Although hesitant, Shrek decides to travel to see Farquaad and try to regain his swamp, along with getting the Fairytale Creatures their homes back, with much encouragement from Pinocchio and the gang ("The Goodbye Song").

Along the way, Shrek rescues a talkative Donkey from some of Farquaad's guards. In return for rescuing him, and offering his friendship, Donkey insists on tagging along to show Shrek the way to Duloc, to which he reluctantly agrees ("Don't Let Me Go").

Meanwhile, in the Kingdom of Duloc, Farquaad is torturing The Gingerbread Man into revealing the whereabouts of other Fairytale Creatures that are still hiding in his Kingdom so he can have them arrested as well. Just as Gingy was going to reveal what he knows, the Captain of the guards arrives and announces that they have found the Magic Mirror. Farquaad asked the mirror if Duloc was the most perfect kingdom of them all. The mirror told him that he's not truly a king yet, but he can become one if he marries a princess. For this episode of "This Is Your Wife" (a parody of The Dating Game), the mirror introduces three different princesses for Lord Farquaad to choose from: Cinderella, Snow White, and Princess Fiona; at the suggestion from his henchman, Thelonious, Farquaad chooses Princess Fiona, who is currently trapped in a castle surrounded by lava and guarded by a terrible fire-breathing dragon. Accepting this as a task, Farquaad decides to marry her to become king, and rushes out to plan a raffle to see which knight would be worthy enough to embark on a quest to retrieve Fiona before the Mirror can tell him what happens to her at night. The Mirror then shows the audience the story of Fiona's childhood.

A seven-year-old Fiona dreams of the brave knight who, as her storybooks tell her, will one day rescue her from her tower and end her mysterious curse with "True Love's First Kiss". As she grows into a teenager, and then a headstrong woman, she becomes a little bit stir-crazy, but she never loses her faith in her fairytales ("I Know It's Today").

Shrek and Donkey arrive in Duloc where Farquaad expresses his love for his kingdom, accompanied by his cheerful cookie-cut army of Duloc Dancers ("What's Up Duloc?"). They approach Farquaad, with him being impressed by Shrek's size and appearance. Farquaad demands that Shrek must rescue Fiona, and in return, he will give Shrek the deed to his swamp.

The two unlikely friends set off to find Fiona, with Shrek becoming increasingly annoyed with Donkey as time progresses ("Travel Song"). After crossing the rickety old bridge and arriving at the castle, Shrek sets off alone to rescue Fiona while Donkey encounters Dragon who initially wants to eat him, but then decides to spare him by keeping him for herself after Donkey manages to charm her ("Donkey Pot Pie"/"Forever"). When Shrek finds Fiona, his lack of interest in playing out her desired, romantic rescue scene annoys her, and he drags her off by force ("This is How a Dream Comes True"). The two of them reunite with Donkey, and all three attempt to escape while being chased by the angry Dragon and her skeleton minions. Shrek traps Dragon and they get to a safe point.

Fiona then insists that Shrek reveal his identity and is shocked that her rescuer is an ogre and not the Prince Charming her stories indicated. Shrek explains that he is merely her champion; instead, she is to marry Farquaad. The trio begin their journey back to Duloc, but Fiona becomes apprehensive as the sun begins to set. She insists that they rest for the night and that she spend the night alone in a nearby cave. Donkey and Shrek remain awake, with Donkey asking Shrek who he would be, if he did not have to be an ogre anymore. As Shrek opens up to Donkey on who he would wish to be, it is revealed that Fiona transforms into an ogress after sunset, as part of her curse, and as she stands apart, alone, and listens, empathizing with Shrek's feelings of being isolated ("Who I'd Be").

=== Act II ===
The next day, Princess Fiona rises early and sings with a bluebird and dances with a deer (before making the bird explode and throwing the deer off a cliff). She assists the Pied Piper in his rat-charming duties ("Morning Person"). Shrek brings down her mood by attempting to give subtle hints about her groom-to-be ("Men of Farquaad's stature are in short supply", "He's very good at small talk", etc.) and mocking her tragic childhood circumstances. The two begin a contest of trying to one-up each other to outdo the others' backstory, but end up revealing their respective pasts ("I Think I Got You Beat"). Both admit to being thrown out by their parents; this connection, as well as bonding over a love of disgusting bodily noises, kindles friendship.

Back in Duloc, Lord Farquaad was in his bathtub planning his wedding, and he reveals his own sordid heritage after The Magic Mirror insists that Farquaad should invite his father, but Farquaad refuses, explaining how he abandoned him in the woods as a child ("The Ballad of Farquaad").

As Shrek and Fiona's newfound camaraderie grows into love, Donkey insists, with the help of the Three Blind Mice from his imagination, that Shrek should gather his courage and romantically engage Fiona ("Make a Move"). Shrek, finally beginning to come out of his caustic, protective shell, tries to find the words to explain his feelings to Fiona ("When Words Fail").

While Shrek is out finding a flower for Fiona, Donkey discovers that Fiona turns into an ogress at night, and she confesses that she was cursed as a child, which is why she was locked away in the tower. Only a kiss from her true love will return her to her proper form, and she asks Donkey to promise never to tell. Shrek arrives near the end of the conversation and misunderstands Fiona's description of herself as an ugly beast, and thinks she is talking about him. Hurt by her presumed opinion, Shrek storms off.

The next day, transformed back to her human form, Fiona decides to tell Shrek about her curse ("Morning Person (Reprise)"). When she tries to explain, Shrek rebuffs her with his "ugly beast" overhearing, causing Fiona in turn to misunderstand. Then Farquaad arrives to claim Fiona and tells Shrek he has cleared the swamp of the Fairytale Creatures, and it now belongs to Shrek again. While not very impressed with Farquaad, Fiona agrees to marry him and insists that they have the wedding before sunset. As Farquaad and Fiona ride back to Duloc, Donkey tries to explain the misunderstanding to Shrek (who is too angry and upset to listen), and Shrek rejects him as well, declaring that he will return to his swamp alone and build a wall to shield himself from the world ("Build a Wall").

Meanwhile, the Fairytale Creatures are on their way to a landfill which is to be their new home, since they were forced to relocate from the swamp. After dealing with the fact that Shrek broke his promise to them, however, Gingy rants that Farquaad's treatment of them is intolerable; just because they are freaks does not mean they deserve to be hated, so he rallies most of the other fairytale creatures into staging a coup d'état against Farquaad's rule. Unfortunately, a bitter Pinocchio (remembering they are not allowed back to Duloc) who doesn't want his friends to get killed, suggests that they should just keep going and wait until everything gets better, all the while wishing to be a real boy. Exasperated by Pinocchio's turndown, Gingy convinces him to join the protest, inspiring him to accept who he is, as all of them have accepted who they are. They gather new confidence and strength in themselves, as they declare that they'll raise their "Freak Flag" high against their tormentors ("Freak Flag"). Now realizing that they have become something more than friends, and have become a family, Pinocchio now leads his gang back to Duloc to overthrow Farquaad once and for all.

Shrek has returned to his once again private swamp, but he misses Fiona. Donkey shows up attempting to seal off his half of the swamp with stone boulders, which Shrek rebuffs. In turn, Donkey angrily berates Shrek for his reclusive and stubborn habits, even to the point of driving off Fiona. An angered Shrek reveals he heard her talking about a hideous creature the night before, and Donkey retorts that they were not talking about him, but of "someone else". When a confused Shrek inquires who it was, Donkey, wanting to keep his promise and still cross with Shrek, refuses to talk. When Shrek apologizes and extends his friendship, Donkey forgives him. The two then go back to Duloc, where Shrek objects to this marriage before Farquaad can kiss Fiona, and Fiona convinces him to let Shrek speak with her. Shrek finally finds the words to express his feelings for Fiona, and he declares his love for her ("Big Bright Beautiful World (Reprise)"). However, his declaration of love is mocked by Farquaad. Caught between love and her desire to break the curse, Fiona tries to escape the event. Just then, the Fairytale Creatures storm into the wedding and protest their banishment. They are also accompanied by Grumpy, one of the Seven Dwarfs, who reveals that he is Farquaad's father, and he kicked Farquaad out at the age of 28 when he wouldn't move out of the basement, revealing Farquaad is a freak as well. During the scuffle, the sun sets, causing Fiona to turn into an ogress in front of everyone, leading to Shrek to realize that Fiona was referring to herself when she was talking to Donkey. Farquaad, furious and disgusted over the change, orders for Shrek to be drawn and quartered along with the Fairytale Creatures and Fiona banished back to her tower. As Farquaad proclaims himself the new King, Shrek whistles for the Dragon, who has now escaped the castle (and is the reason Shrek and Donkey got to the wedding just in time). Dragon then crashes through the window with Donkey and incinerates Farquaad with her fiery breath.

With Farquaad dead, Shrek and Fiona admit their love for each other and share true love's first kiss. Fiona's curse is broken, and she takes her true form: an ogress. At first, she is ashamed of her looks, but Shrek declares that she is still beautiful. The two ogres begin a new life together (along with Donkey, Dragon, and the Fairytale Creatures) as everyone celebrates their liberation from Farquaad's rule ("This Is Our Story"). In the end, Shrek and Fiona (in association with Donkey and Dragon) host their post-wedding party ("I'm A Believer").

== Musical numbers ==
=== Broadway ===
Act I

- "Overture" – Orchestra
- "Big Bright Beautiful World" – Mama Ogre, Papa Ogre, Shrek
- "Story Of My Life" – Pinocchio, Elf, Peter Pan, Ugly Duckling, Fairy Godmother, Sugar Plum Fairy, Three Pigs, Wicked Witch, Mama Bear, Mad Hatter, Big Bad Wolf, Humpty Dumpty, White Rabbit, Three Bears, Fairytale Creatures
- "Story Of My Life (Tag)" – Elf, Fairy Godmother, Pinocchio, Big Bad Wolf, Fairytale Creatures≠
- "The Goodbye Song" – Elf, Fairytale Creatures≠
- "Don't Let Me Go" – Donkey*
- "Regiment" – Guards≠
- "I Know It's Today" – Young Fiona, Teen Fiona, Fiona
- "What's Up, Duloc?" – Lord Farquaad, Duloc Performers
- "What’s Up, Duloc? (Reprise)" – Lord Farquaad, Duloc Performers≠
- "Travel Song" – Donkey, Shrek
- "Donkey Pot Pie" – Dragon, Donkey, Knights
- "This Is How A Dream Comes True" – Fiona, Dragon
- "Who I'd Be" – Shrek, Fiona, Donkey

Act II

- "Entr’acte" – Orchestra≠
- "Morning Person" – Fiona, Bluebird
- "I Think I Got You Beat" – Fiona, Shrek
- "The Ballad Of Farquaad" – Lord Farquaad, Guards
- "Air Guitar Crossover" – Fiona, Shrek≠
- "Make A Move" – Donkey, Three Blind Mice
- "When Words Fail" – Shrek
- "Morning Person (Reprise)" – Fiona
- "The Arrival Of Farquaad" – Lord Farquaad
- "Build A Wall" – Shrek
- "Freak Flag" – Gingy, Mama Bear, Pinocchio, Three Pigs, Humpty Dumpty, Papa Bear, Elf, Wicked Witch, Mad Hatter, Big Bad Wolf, Fairytale Creatures
- "Wedding Procession" – Choir≠
- "Big Bright Beautiful World (Reprise)" – Shrek
- "Cathedral Sunset/Transformation" – Crowd≠
- "Beautiful Ain’t Always Pretty" – Shrek≠
- "Finale" (“This is Our Story”) – Fiona, Shrek, Donkey, Mama Bear, Pinocchio, Gingy, Fairytale Creatures
- "I'm a Believer" – Shrek, Three Pigs, Fiona, Young Fiona, Donkey, Full Company≠ (as of October 2, 2009)

≠ Not included on the original Broadway cast recording. "I'm a Believer" and "Forever", however, was recorded later and released as a single as it was not in the show when the cast recording was made.

Changes

- An Overture and Entr'acte were added following the Seattle run, along with the song "Build a Wall" which was originally "More To The Story." This song was cut prior to the West End production opening.
- "This Is Our Story" or "Finale" replaced "I Smell a Happy Ending" following the Seattle run, whilst "What Happens to Love?" and "More To The Story" were cut.
- Beginning with the first North American tour, a new song was written for Dragon, "Forever." This was then performed in all subsequent productions, replacing "Donkey Pot Pie."
- "Don't Let Me Go" was cut from the West End production, although an alternative version reinstated for the UK Tour.

=== US tour ===
Act I

- "Overture" – Orchestra
- "Big Bright Beautiful World" – Mama Ogre, Papa Ogre, Queen Lillian, King Harold, Shrek, Happy People/Angry Mob
- "Story Of My Life" – Pinocchio, Elf, Peter Pan, Ugly Duckling, Sugar Plum Fairy, Three Pigs, Wicked Witch, Mama Bear, Elf, Big Bad Wolf, Humpty Dumpty, Fairytale Creatures
- "Story Of My Life (Tag)" – Elf, Ugly Duckling, Pinocchio, Big Bad Wolf, Fairytale Creatures≠
- "The Goodbye Song" – Baby Bear, Fairytale Creatures≠
- "Don't Let Me Go" – Donkey
- "Regiment #1" – Guards≠
- "Regiment (Reprise)" – Guards≠
- "What's Up, Duloc?" – Lord Farquaad, Duloc Performers
- "What’s Up, Duloc? (Reprise)" – Lord Farquaad, Duloc Performers≠
- "I Know It's Today" – Young Fiona, Teen Fiona, Fiona
- "Travel Song" – Donkey, Shrek
- "Forever" – Dragon, Donkey, Knights
- "This Is How A Dream Comes True" – Fiona, Dragon
- "Who I'd Be" – Shrek, Fiona, Donkey

Act II

- "Entr'acte" – Orchestra≠
- "Morning Person" – Fiona, Bluebird
- "I Think I Got You Beat" – Fiona, Shrek
- "The Ballad Of Farquaad" – Lord Farquaad, Guards
- "Air Guitar Crossover" – Fiona, Shrek≠
- "Make A Move" – Donkey, Three Blind Mice
- "Make A Move (Tag)" – Donkey, Three Blind Mice≠
- "When Words Fail" – Shrek
- "Morning Person (Reprise)" – Fiona
- "The Arrival Of Farquaad" – Lord Farquaad
- "Build A Wall" – Shrek
- "Freak Flag" – Gingy, Sugar Plum Fairy, Pinocchio, Three Pigs, Ugly Duckling, Papa Bear, Fairy Godmother, Wicked Witch, Big Bad Wolf, Humpty Dumpty, Mama Bear, Fairytale Creatures
- "Wedding Procession" – Choir≠
- "Big Bright Beautiful World (Reprise)" – Shrek
- "Cathedral Sunset/Transformation" – Crowd≠
- "Beautiful Ain’t Always Pretty" – Shrek≠
- "Finale: This Is Our Story" – Fiona, Shrek, Donkey, Mama Bear, Pinocchio, Gingy, Fairytale Creatures
- "I'm a Believer (Encore)" – Shrek, Three Pigs, Fiona, Young Fiona, Donkey, Dragon, Full Company≠ (as of October 2, 2009)

≠ Not included on the original Broadway cast recording. "I'm a Believer" and "Forever", however, was recorded later and released as a single as it was not in the show when the cast recording was made.

=== Lyrical controversy ===
In 2016, the Canadian tour of the musical changed a lyric in the song "Story of My Life", after a trans man who attended a performance at the Neptune Theatre in Halifax, Nova Scotia, objected to the presence of a transphobic slur, in a line where the Big Bad Wolf says that the knights called him "a hot and tranny mess"; Pink News reported that the word appears several other times in the play. A theatre spokeswoman issued an apology and said that subsequent performances would not contain the word. A 2017 prompt book for a production of Shrek Jr., a shortened version of the show for children's theater, contains a revised lyric which removes the slur. However, in 2018, when several students in Maryland went on a field trip to a performance of the full musical at a local high school, they complained that the slur appeared in the song. A subsequent controversy emerged when a parent who also complained about the slur was fired from her job at the Maryland State Education Association, with the organization saying that her statements represented a conflict of interest.

== Casts ==
Character	Seattle	Broadway	U.S. Tour	West End	UK Tour
Character	2008		2010	2011	2014
Shrek	Brian d'Arcy James	Brian d'Arcy James	Eric Petersen	Nigel Lindsay	Dean Chisnall
Princess Fiona	Sutton Foster	Sutton Foster	Haven Burton	Amanda Holden	Faye Brookes
Donkey	Chester Gregory	Daniel Breaker	Alan Mingo Jr.	Richard Blackwood	Idriss Kargbo
Lord Farquaad	Christopher Sieber	Christopher Sieber	David F.M. Vaughn	Nigel Harman	Gerard Carey
Pinocchio	John Tartaglia	John Tartaglia	Blakely Slaybaugh	Jonathan Stewart	Will Haswell
Dragon	Kecia Lewis-Evans	Haven Burton; Aymee Garcia; Rachel Stern	Carrie Compere	Landi Oshinowo	Candace Furbert
Gingy	Haven Burton	Haven Burton	Aymee Garcia	Alice Fearn	Nikki Bentley

=== Broadway (2008-10) replacements ===
- Shrek: Ben Crawford, Eric Petersen (u/s)
- Farquaad: Ben Crawford (u/s)
- Pinocchio: Robb Sapp

=== West End (2011-13) replacements ===
- Shrek: Dean Chisnall, Bradley Jaden (u/s)
- Fiona: Kimberley Walsh, Carley Stenson
- Farquaad: Neil McDermott

== Instrumentation ==
The Orchestra includes one bass guitar player, one trumpeter, one trombonist, two guitar players, one drummer, two violinists, two reed players, one horn player, two keyboard players, a cello player, and a percussion player. The guitar players double on ukulele, mandolins, electric guitars, and acoustic guitars. The trumpeter doubles on a flugelhorn and a piccolo trumpet. The trombonist doubles on tenor and bass trombones. The bass player doubles on the upright bass, the electric bass, and the 5-string bass guitar. The first reed doubles on alto sax, clarinet, flute, and piccolo. The second reed doubles on soprano sax, baritone sax, tenor sax, flute, bass clarinet, and clarinet.

The original Broadway orchestration included an additional trumpet, an additional trombone/tuba, two more violinists, one more cellist, and two more reed players, and an additional acoustic bass player. In this orchestration, the first reed doubles on piccolo, flute, and recorder. The second reed doubles on oboe, English horn, clarinet, and alto sax. The third reed doubles on flute, clarinet, bass clarinet, soprano sax, and tenor sax. The fourth reed doubles on clarinet, bassoon, and baritone sax.

== Recordings ==
The original Broadway cast recording was recorded on January 12, 2009, and was released on March 24, 2009, by Decca Broadway Records. The album debuted at #1 on Billboard's Top Cast Albums chart and #88 on the Billboard 200. "I'm a Believer" was not featured on the initial recording as it was only added to the show on October 2, 2009. It was later included as part of a Highlighted Cast Recording, released on November 17, 2009. On December 4, 2009, when the Grammy Award nominees were announced, the cast recording was nominated for Best Musical Show Album.

"Donkey Pot Pie" (which is included on the original Broadway cast recording) was cut from future productions, replaced by "Forever." The song became available on iTunes in 2011. It was recorded during a live performance of the national tour in Chicago, and features Carrie Compere (Dragon) and Alan Mingo Jr. (Donkey).

The original London cast recorded a single of "I'm a Believer" for promotional purposes.

An original Spanish-language cast recording featuring the Madrid cast was recorded between August and September 2011, and released in September. The Spanish album includes later added songs "Forever" and "I'm a Believer", as well as different orchestrations to the Broadway recording and the arrangements made for the national tour.

== Reception ==
The musical opened to mixed reviews from theatre critics. Ben Brantley wrote in The New York Times: "'Shrek,' for the record, is not bad.... As the title character, a misanthropic green ogre who learns to love, the talented Mr. James is... encumbered with padding and prosthetics.... As the evil, psychologically maimed Lord Farquaad, the very droll Christopher Sieber is required to walk on his knees, with tiny fake legs dangling before him — an initially funny sight gag that soon drags". He praises Sutton Foster as "an inspired, take-charge musical comedian.... Ms. Foster manages both to make fun of and exult in classical musical-comedy moves while creating a real, full character at the same time."

Variety noted that the production had a reported budget of $24 million. Any "theme-park cutesiness is offset by the mischievous humor in David Lindsay-Abaire's book and lyrics. The production's real achievement, however, is that the busy visuals and gargantuan set-pieces never overwhelm the personalities of the actors or their characters. The ensemble is talented and the four leads, in particular, couldn't be better."

The Associated Press said that "the folks at DreamWorks have done their darndest to make sure we are entertained at Shrek the Musical, the company's lavish stage adaptation of its hit animated movie. For much of the time, they succeed, thanks to the talent and ingratiating appeal of the show's four principal performers. The show's massive sets and colorful costumes (both courtesy of Tim Hatley) are so visually eye-catching that they often distract from what's going on with the story and score. Composer Jeanine Tesori has written attractive, eclectic, pop-flavored melodies that range from a jaunty 'Travel Song' to a gutsy duet called 'I Got You Beat' for Shrek and Fiona that revels in rude noises." The review also noted that Lindsay-Abaire's lyrics are often fun and quite witty.

USA Today gave the show three and a half stars out of four, writing: "Shrek, which draws from William Steig's book about a lovable ogre and the DreamWorks animated movie that it inspired, is nonetheless a triumph of comic imagination with a heart as big and warm as Santa's. It is the most ingeniously wacky, transcendently tasteless Broadway musical since The Producers, and more family-friendly than that gag-fest." The review also noted, however, that "Like other musical adaptations of hit films, Shrek... leans heavily on winking satire. There are the usual nods to more fully realized shows, from Gypsy to A Chorus Line, and Jeanine Tesori's blandly ingratiating score doesn't feature any songs you're likely to be humming 20 years from now."

== Awards and nominations ==
=== Original Broadway production ===
Year	Award Ceremony	Category	Nominee	Result	Ref
2009	Tony Award	Best Musical		Nominated	
2009	Tony Award	Best Book of a Musical	David Lindsay-Abaire	Nominated	
2009	Tony Award	Best Original Score	Jeanine Tesori (music) and David Lindsay-Abaire (lyrics)	Nominated	
2009	Tony Award	Best Actor in a Musical	Brian d'Arcy James	Nominated	
2009	Tony Award	Best Actress in a Musical	Sutton Foster	Nominated	
2009	Tony Award	Best Featured Actor in a Musical	Christopher Sieber	Nominated	
2009	Tony Award	Best Orchestrations	Danny Troob and John Clancy	Nominated	
2009	Tony Award	Best Costume Design	Tim Hatley	Won	
2009	Drama Desk Award	Outstanding Musical		Nominated	
2009	Drama Desk Award	Outstanding Book of a Musical	David Lindsay-Abaire	Nominated	
2009	Drama Desk Award	Outstanding Actor in a Musical	Brian d'Arcy James	Won	
2009	Drama Desk Award	Outstanding Actor in a Musical	Daniel Breaker	Nominated	
2009	Drama Desk Award	Outstanding Actress in a Musical	Sutton Foster	Nominated	
2009	Drama Desk Award	Outstanding Featured Actor in a Musical	Christopher Sieber	Nominated	
2009	Drama Desk Award	Outstanding Director of a Musical	Jason Moore	Nominated	
2009	Drama Desk Award	Outstanding Music	Jeanine Tesori	Nominated	
2009	Drama Desk Award	Outstanding Lyrics	David Lindsay-Abaire	Nominated	
2009	Drama Desk Award	Outstanding Orchestrations	Danny Troob	Nominated	
2009	Drama Desk Award	Outstanding Set Design	Tim Hatley	Won	
2009	Drama Desk Award	Outstanding Costume Design	Tim Hatley	Won	
2009	Grammy Award	Best Musical Show Album		Nominated	

=== Original London production ===
Year	Award Ceremony	Category	Nominee	Result	Ref
2012	Laurence Olivier Award	Best New Musical		Nominated	
2012	Laurence Olivier Award	Best Actor in a Musical	Nigel Lindsay	Nominated	
2012	Laurence Olivier Award	Best Performance in a Supporting Role in a Musical	Nigel Harman	Won	
2012	Laurence Olivier Award	Best Costume Design	Tim Hatley	Nominated	

== Home media ==
In October 2009, Jeffrey Katzenberg said that a performance of the Broadway production had been recorded for a potential DVD release. However, due to the national tour and West End productions running considerably longer, the idea was put on-hold. On July 19, 2013, following the closure of the national tour and West End productions, Amazon.com confirmed that the filmed performance would be available for instant viewing on September 17, 2013. It also became available "in HD for playback on Kindle Fire HD, Xbox 360, PlayStation 3, Roku or other HD compatible devices" beginning October 15, 2013. The home video release is also available on Netflix Streaming as of January 2014. A DVD, Blu-ray, and digital download was also released on that day. The performance is an edit of several live performances as well as a performance shot without an audience. The original principal cast appear, as well as various alumni across the show's Broadway run. Also, it keeps the song "Donkey Pot Pie" instead of the replacement, "Forever." It grossed $564,168 in home sales.
