= Kirstie (TV series) =

Television series

- Genre: Sitcom
- Created by: Marco Pennette
- Directed by: Andy Cadiff; Anthony Rich
- Starring: Kirstie Alley; Eric Petersen; Michael Richards; Rhea Perlman
- Composer: Ron Wasserman
- Country of origin: United States
- Original language: English
- No. of seasons: 1
- No. of episodes: 12

Production
- Executive producers: Jason Weinberg; Keith Cox; Kirstie Alley; Larry W. Jones; Marco Pennette
- Camera setup: Multi-camera
- Running time: 30 minutes
- Production companies: Marco Pennette Productions; True Blue Productions; TV Land Original Productions

Original release
- Network: TV Land
- Release: December 4, 2013 – February 26, 2014

Kirstie is an American television sitcom starring Kirstie Alley that aired on TV Land from December 4, 2013, to February 26, 2014. TV Land cancelled Kirstie on July 29, 2014.

== Synopsis ==
Kirstie tells the story of Tony Award-winning actress Madison "Maddie" Banks as she navigates through life after Arlo, the son whom she gave up at birth, reappears. Arlo wishes to reconnect with his biological mother after his adoptive parents died. With her assistant, Thelma, and her driver, Frank, encouraging her, Maddie decides it's not too late to give motherhood a try.

== Cast and characters ==
=== Main cast ===
- Kirstie Alley as Madison "Maddie" Banks (born Brenda Kluszewski)
- Eric Petersen as Arlo Barth, Maddie's son
- Michael Richards as Frank Baxter, Maddie's driver
- Rhea Perlman as Thelma Katz, Maddie's personal secretary

=== Guest cast ===
- Gilles Marini as Michel, Maddie's first personal chef
- Xosha Roquemore as Tanya
- Richard Burgi as Tony Cameron
- Bryan Callen as Lucas Kogen
- Larry Joe Campbell as Clown
- Lucila Sola as Lucila, Maddie's second personal chef
- Tim Bagley as Robber
- Michael Dunn as Kevin
- Geoff Pierson as Hugh Winters
- Valerie Mahaffey as Victoria Winters
- Lindsey Kraft as Melissa Winters

=== Special guest stars ===
- Christopher McDonald as Jeffrey Sheppard, Maddie's Broadway co-star
- Kristin Chenoweth as Brittany Gold, the understudy for Madison Banks
- Cloris Leachman as Shirley Kluszewski, Maddie's mother
- Kathy Griffin as herself
- John Travolta as Mickey Russo
- Kristen Johnston as 'the real' Madison Banks
- George Wendt as Duke Bainbridge, Thelma's gay ex-husband
- Jason Alexander as Stanford Temple, Maddie's agent

== Episodes ==
Every episode of the series was directed by Andy Cadiff, with the exception of episode 3, which was directed by Anthony Rich instead.

No.	Title	Written by	Original release date	Prod. code	U.S. viewers (millions)
1	"Pilot"	Marco Pennette	December 4, 2013	101	N/A
Actress Maddie Banks has landed the female lead in the new hit Broadway show Worst Case Scenario, but her elation is cut short when the son she gave up for adoption 26 years ago shows up, announcing that his adoptive mother has died.
2	"Arlo Moves In"	Mark Driscoll	December 4, 2013	111	N/A
Maddie promises to be present for a home-cooked meal that Arlo offered to prepare for her, but she runs into an old flame (Richard Burgi) after a performance of her show, and decides to hook up with him rather than head home for Arlo's dinner.
3	"Arlo's Birthday"	Danny Jacobson & Sarah Masson	December 11, 2013	109	0.79
After Maddie's attempt at throwing a party for Arlo's 27th birthday flops, she and the gang join him and his friends at a karaoke bar. It turns out that Arlo is a really good singer, causing Maddie to go overboard and try to make him a star.
4	"Little Bummer Boy"	Heide Perlman	December 18, 2013	103	0.91
Maddie's over-the-top attempt to give Arlo a special first Christmas with her is upended when he invites her abrasive mother (Cloris Leachman) as a surprise.
5	"The Girl Next Door"	Danny Jacobson & Sarah Masson	January 1, 2014	108	0.81
When Kathy Griffin looks at a penthouse across the hall, Maddie goes to great lengths to remain the biggest star in her building. Unknown to Maddie, Arlo has been a huge fan of Griffin's for years. Arlo also develops a crush on Griffin's chef, Lucila (Lucila Sola), and convinces Maddie to hire her despite the fact that Lucila is an awful cook.
6	"Mickey & Maddie"	Steve Baldikoski & Bryan Behar	January 8, 2014	107	0.78
After firing a stagehand named Mickey (John Travolta), Maddie consoles him with a one night stand, but then can't get rid of him. Frank asks Lucila, Arlo's crush, to be his tango partner in a dance competition.
7	"Like a Virgin"	Marco Pennette	January 22, 2014	104	0.80
After learning that Arlo is a virgin, Maddie pays her understudy Brittany (Kristin Chenoweth) to seduce him. But things go awry when, after the act, Arlo says he is in love with Brittany and makes plans to spend the rest of his life with her.
8	"Maddie vs. Maddie"	Steve Baldikoski & Bryan Behar	January 29, 2014	106	0.78
When Maddie encounters the real Madison Banks (Kristen Johnston), a waitress whose audition (and name) she stole over 25 years ago, she asks what she can do to make things right. The real Maddie suggests that they exchange lives for an evening, but she soon kidnaps Frank until the current Maddie agrees to a re-do of the audition in front of the original director.
9	"When They Met"	Story by : Mark Driscoll; Teleplay by : Andy Gordon	February 5, 2014	110	0.73
After Frank irritates Maddie by not putting her name in his "Tony Nomination Pool" with other limo drivers, Arlo wonders how they ever got along. This leads Frank, Thelma and Maddie to recall when the three of them met in the 1980s.
10	"Thelma's Ex"	Story by : Mark Driscoll; Teleplay by : Heide Perlman	February 12, 2014	105	0.63
Thelma's ex-husband Duke (George Wendt), a professional pool player, is in town to tell Thelma his womanizing days are over. Maddie finds a ring in Duke's coat pocket, fears that the two will get remarried, and freaks out over the prospect of losing Thelma. But Maddie couldn't be more wrong about Duke's intentions. Meanwhile, a bird gets loose in the apartment, causing Frank to slip and break Maddie's Tony Award.
11	"Maddie's Agent"	Andy Gordon	February 19, 2014	102	0.68
Maddie has a hard time trying to fire her agent (Jason Alexander), whom she considers useless but can't get rid of because she fears firing people. Thelma must face her fear of identical twin girls who live in the building that creep her out like the children from The Shining, while Frank must face his fear of tunnels. Elsewhere, Arlo is being bullied by a coworker named Ahdoot, but he turns the tables when Ahdoot makes a pass at Lucila.
12	"The Dinner Party"	Story by : Andy Gordon; Teleplay by : Heide Perlman and Mark Driscoll	February 26, 2014	112	0.84
Maddie hosts a dinner party for Arlo's new girlfriend Melissa (Lindsey Kraft), a graduate student whom he met in the building, and her snooty parents (Geoff Pierson and Valerie Mahaffey) who are both history professors at Columbia. To bone up, Maddie watches The History Channel all night, but the station has programmed a Hitler marathon. Thelma pretends to be Maddie's maid, while Frank goes to pick up Professor Danniker, Maddie's date and "academic buffer" for the evening. The night is a disaster, as Thelma eats some of Frank's "special" gummy candy, Frank has to step in for Danniker, who got drunk and passed out in his limo, and Maddie has to dodge the advances of Melissa's amorous mother. After Melissa insults Arlo's family and friends, he says he is proud to have people in his life who will go to such great lengths to help him.

=== Hot in Cleveland crossover ===
A fifth-season episode of fellow TV Land original series Hot in Cleveland ("Bucket: We're Going to New York") has the women from that show visiting Kirstie character Maddie Banks, who is revealed to be the former acting school roommate of Victoria Chase (Wendie Malick).
