= Companhia Zaffari =

Brazilian supermarket chain

Companhia Zaffari Comércio e Indústria
- Company type: Private company
- Industry: Retail
- Founded: 1935
- Headquarters: Porto Alegre, Brazil
- Key people: Claudio Zaffari, (chairman)
- Products: Consumer Goods
- Revenue: ▲BRL$ 7.1 billion (2021)
- Number of employees: 14,106
- Website: www.zaffari.com.br

Companhia Zaffari (Portuguese for "Zaffari Company") is the tenth largest Brazilian company that has a chain of supermarkets and hypermarkets in Rio Grande do Sul, and São Paulo.

According to the ranking of the Brazilian Association of Supermarkets (ABRAS) in 2023, it is one of the most efficient companies in the Hypermarket and Supermarket sector, and the twelfth supermarket chain in the country in annual revenue. Currently, the Zaffari Group has 41 stores nationwide.

== History ==
Companhia Zaffari's history began in the 1930s, in a small family.

In 1935, the founder Francisco José Zaffari and his wife, Santina de Carli Zaffari, built a small grocery store, placed in front of the couple's residence, in the Sete de Setembro village on the Erechim city.

Years later, in 1947, Zaffari moved with his family to Erval Grande, where he opened a new store, now better structured. His children's played key role in that growth, helping the father in managing the store.

=== Expansion ===
In the 1950s, the business prospered and the family opened the first branches in neighboring towns. In 1960, the company came to Porto Alegre, opening its first store in the capital, a food wholesale business.

This was the starting point for a new stage of expansion, which resulted in opening the first supermarket, in 1965.

Zaffari's supermarkets are branded with the company name and its hypermarkets got the "Bourbon" brand, but some recent stores, such as Bourbon Wallig and Bourbon São Paulo, their hypermarket were also branded "Zaffari".

== Malls ==
In December 1991, Zaffari opened its first mall, Bourbon Shopping Assis Brasil, in Porto Alegre. The mall has an Bourbon hypermarket as an anchor tenant and 98 stores.

In 1997, Zaffari bought Shopping Matarazzo in São Paulo to start its operations outside Rio Grande do Sul but several problems prevented Zaffari from operating there.

On February of the same year, the Zaffari Canoas store was reformed and became Bourbon Shopping Canoas, with 45 stores and a food court.

In 1998, Bourbon Shopping Ipiranga was opened, with 70,000 square meters, 87 stores and a multiplex cinema with 8 screens.

One year later, Zaffari opened its first mall outside Porto Alegre, Bourbon Shopping Passo Fundo, with 50 stores.

In 2001, Zaffari opened Bourbon Shopping Country, with 95,000 square meters, over 100 stores and a Livraria Cultura mega-bookstore. In June 2007, was opened the Bourbon Country Theater, with capacity of 1019 people.

In December 2004, Bourbon Shopping São Leopoldo was opened, with a 7,000-square-meter hypermarket, 70 stores and a multiplex cinema with 5 screens.

In January 2006, Zaffari bought NovoShopping, in Novo Hamburgo, with over 49,000 square meters of built area. After the reform, ended in 2010, the mall is named Bourbon Shopping Novo Hamburgo.

In March 2008, Bourbon Shopping São Paulo was opened. It is the first Zaffari operation outside Rio Grande do Sul and was built on the same place where Shopping Matarazzo was. Bourbon Shopping São Paulo hypermarket is named Záffari instead of Zaffari, emphasizing the intended pronunciation to this new public. It also has 210 stores, the first Brazilian IMAX cinema and Teatro Bradesco, a theater with a capacity of 1457 people.

In April 2012: Bourbon Shopping Wallig opens to the public. On the terrain was a factory of stoves with the same name "Wallig". With a C&A store, Lojas Renner store, an Zaffari hypermarket, a Centauro store, a Marisa store, a Riachuelo store and a Fast Shop store. This is the First IMAX 3D Premium of Rio Grande Do Sul
