= Kevin Can F**k Himself =

American dark comedy television series

- Season 1 promotional poster
- Genre: Dark comedy; Drama
- Created by: Valerie Armstrong
- Directed by: Oz Rodriguez; Anna Dokoza; Craig DiGregorio; Valerie Armstrong
- Starring: Annie Murphy; Mary Hollis Inboden; Eric Petersen; Alex Bonifer; Raymond Lee; Brian Howe; Candice Coke
- Music by: Keegan DeWitt
- Country of origin: United States
- Original language: English
- No. of seasons: 2
- No. of episodes: 16

Production
- Executive producers: Oz Rodriguez; Susie Fitzgerald; Rashida Jones; Will McCormack; Craig DiGregorio; Valerie Armstrong; Sean Clements; Colin Walsh
- Cinematography: Adrian Peng Correia; Shannon Madden
- Editors: Dan Schalk; Kenneth LaMere; Ivan Victor; Maura Corey
- Camera setup: Single-camera; Multi-camera
- Running time: 42–46 minutes
- Production companies: Mr. D Productions; Thank You Sorry Thank You Productions; Le Train Train; AMC Studios

Original release
- Network: AMC
- Release: June 20, 2021 – October 10, 2022

Kevin Can F**k Himself (Note: Also promoted as Kevin Can F Himself. The rendering in the title sequence differs between episodes; in the pilot, the letters in "fuck" are shown individually between "Kevin Can" and "Himself". In all subsequent episodes, the 'U' and 'C' (and sometimes 'K') of 'fuck' are obscured in a different way each time.) is an American dark comedy-drama television series created by Valerie Armstrong, who also serves as an executive producer. The title is a parody of the CBS sitcom Kevin Can Wait.

The first two episodes were made available on AMC+ on June 13, 2021, and the series premiered on AMC on June 20, 2021. In August 2021, the series was renewed for a second season. In November 2021, AMC confirmed the series would end after two seasons. The second and final season premiered on August 22, 2022, on AMC and AMC+.

== Premise ==
Set in Worcester, Massachusetts, the show explores the life of Allison McRoberts, a woman struggling to redefine her life amid an abusive marriage to her husband, Kevin, an egocentric man-child who weaponizes incompetence to exercise total freedom at her expense. The show presents contrasting perspectives of her experience—a typical sitcom wife when Allison is with her husband, shown with a multiple-camera setup and canned laughter, and as a woman navigating a difficult personal path, filmed in the single-camera setup more common to television dramas.

== Cast and characters ==
=== Main ===
- Annie Murphy as Allison Devine McRoberts, a housewife seeking to take the lead in her own life after a decade of trying to be a perfect wife.
- Mary Hollis Inboden as Patricia Deirdre "Patty" O'Connor, the McRoberts' neighbor who owns a hair salon. In the sitcom sections she acts as the tomboyish, tough, "honorary guy" member of Kevin's friends whom they often forget is a girl.
- Eric Petersen as Kevin McRoberts, an insensitive and unambitious man-child who is Allison's husband—modeled on the loutish husbands in sitcoms such as The King of Queens, The Honeymooners, and, most pointedly, Kevin Can Wait, the CBS sitcom starring Kevin James. He is completely oblivious to Allison's life and activities when she is away from him.
- Alex Bonifer as Neil O'Connor, Kevin's friend and Patty's brother. During Season 1, he is mostly a side character in the "sitcom" segments as the naive, devoted best friend sidekick character. He is more involved in the reality segments during Season 2, becoming incredibly unstable and eventually disillusioned with Kevin's behavior.
- Brian Howe as Peter "Pete" McRoberts, Kevin's father. He predominantly makes caustic comments on the goings-on in the "sitcom" portions of the show and often gets involved in his son's activities.
- Raymond Lee as Samuel "Sam" Park, Allison's old friend from high school who now owns a diner and is married. He and Allison still have feelings for each other.
- Candice Coke as Detective Tammy Ridgeway (main season 2; recurring season 1), a detective investigating illegal oxycodone distribution; she enters into a relationship with Patty in season 1.

=== Recurring ===
- Jamie Denbo as Diane McAntee, Allison's aunt and co-worker who runs a liquor store; she starts having sex with Neil in season 2
- Meghan Leathers as Jenn (season 1; guest season 2), Sam's wife
- Robin Lord Taylor as Nick (season 1; guest season 2), a restaurant worker who is out on parole
- Sean Clements as Kurt (season 1), Patty's boyfriend
- Lauren Weedman as Lorraine (season 2), Pete's girlfriend, who annoys Kevin

=== Guest ===
- Jon Glaser as Paddy
- Brian Scalabrine as Himself
- Sean Avery as Himself
- Peri Gilpin as Donna Devine, Allison's mother
- Rachel Dratch as Beatrice, a former employee at City Hall
- Erinn Hayes as Molly, Kevin's new girlfriend

== Episodes ==
Each episode was released on AMC+ one week prior to the AMC broadcast date.

Season	Episodes	Originally released	
Season	Episodes	First released	Last released
1	8	June 20, 2021	August 1, 2021
2	8	August 22, 2022	October 10, 2022

=== Season 1 (2021) ===
No. overall	No. in season	Title	Directed by	Written by	Original release date	U.S. viewers (millions)
1	1	"Living the Dream"	Oz Rodriguez	Valerie Armstrong	June 20, 2021	0.370
Allison McRoberts is unhappily married to her self-absorbed, irresponsible man-child husband Kevin. As their tenth anniversary approaches, Kevin dismisses Allison's wish for an intimate dinner, and instead throws his annual "Anniversa-rager" party with his father Pete and his best friend Neil. Allison reunites with her old high-school friend Sam, who has moved back to their hometown and now owns a diner. Growing increasingly resentful of her situation, Allison hopes to leave Worcester and move to a nicer house with Kevin, but she learns from Neil's sister Patty that Kevin had secretly drained their savings account years prior. Enraged by the news, Allison breaks down and goes on a bender with Marcus, a local cocaine dealer. Returning home, Allison accidentally breaks Kevin's glass mug, then fantasizes about stabbing Kevin in the neck with one of the glass shards.
2	2	"New Tricks"	Oz Rodriguez	Dana Ledoux Miller & Kevin Etten	June 20, 2021	0.370
Allison obsesses over the idea of murdering Kevin and becomes inspired after stumbling upon a man at the library who has died of an OxyContin overdose. After failing to acquire oxycodone from her doctor, Allison tries to buy the drugs from Marcus, hoping to use them to poison Kevin; Marcus refers Allison to a friend. Allison later meets with Marcus's friend, who tries to have sex with her; Allison learns that Marcus had told him that she was a prostitute. Allison visits Sam at his diner, and the two briefly reflect on their past. Meanwhile, Kevin believes that their new neighbors have stolen his Belichick hoodie, which was really stolen by Allison, and he retaliates by setting their lawn on fire. In another attempt to buy the Oxys, Allison visits a local beauty salon, having been told that the business is a drug front. Allison is shocked to discover that Patty operates the salon.
3	3	"We're Selling Washing Machines"	Anna Dokoza	Craig DiGregorio & Noelle Valdivia	June 27, 2021	0.324
In flashbacks, Patty gets approached by her former classmate, Terrance, about selling generic drugs. Patty accepts Terrance's offer and begins to sell the pills to her salon clients. In the present, Allison tells Patty that she wants to buy Oxys to get rid of a stalker, and Patty reluctantly agrees to give Allison the drugs the following Monday. Kevin competes in a chili cook-off with Neil. Sam receives his eight-year sobriety chip in AA, and he invites Allison to the ceremony. At the AA meeting, Allison reunites with Sam's wife Jenn. Allison continues to get harassed by Marcus, and she responds by reporting Marcus's drug dealings to the police. Marcus gets arrested and implicates Terrance; the police raid Terrance's pharmacy, putting Patty's business in jeopardy. Following the raid, Patty's boyfriend Kurt impulsively proposes to her.
4	4	"Live Free or Die"	Anna Dokoza	Mel Shimkovitz	July 4, 2021	0.216
In the aftermath of the pharmacy bust, Patty gets questioned by Detective Tammy. Kevin, Neil, and Pete open a themed escape room in Kevin's basement. The plan goes wrong when the escape room participants accidentally get locked in the basement. Allison and Patty embark on a road trip to Vermont to buy the Oxys from a dealer named Red Rooster. In Vermont, Patty meets with the Red Rooster, who instead gives her a gun. When Allison tries to buy the drugs from a truck driver at a gas station, Patty pistol-whips the truck driver, mistakenly believing that he is the stalker; Allison steals the pills from the driver before running away. While driving home, Allison and Patty get pulled over by the police, as Kevin had called the cops on Allison for failing to answer his phone calls. Following the incident, Allison confides to Patty about Kevin's controlling behavior, and admits that she wanted the drugs to poison Kevin.
5	5	"New Patty"	Anna Dokoza	Tom Scharpling	July 11, 2021	0.222
Patty reveals that she does not feel that Allison would be capable of poisoning Kevin. Returning to Worcester, Patty expresses her apprehension over Kurt's proposal. Realizing that their relationship isn't working, Kurt breaks up with Patty. Kevin, Neil, and Pete attempt to replace Patty in the friend group, which goes awry in various ways. Having successfully obtained her Oxy pills, Allison considers putting the drugs in Kevin's food, but ultimately decides against it. Allison quits her job at the liquor store and accepts a job offer at Sam's diner, where she also begins a sexual affair with Sam. Patty gets blackmailed by Nick, the drug-dealing nephew of one of her salon clients who has been trafficking his aunt's drugs across Worcester. In light of Detective Tammy's investigation, Patty suggests to Allison that they frame Kevin as the local drug dealer; they also consider hiring Nick as a hitman.
6	6	"The Grand Victorian"	Anna Dokoza	Sean Clements	July 18, 2021	0.307
Nick agrees to kill Kevin in exchange for $7,000, and the girls give him the Oxy pills as down-payment. On his birthday, Kevin juggles two parties: a dinner at a fancy restaurant with Allison, and playing at the arcade next door with Neil and Pete. Numerous events occur at the restaurant: Nick unexpectedly arrives, which worries Allison, though it is ultimately revealed that he works there as a busboy; Allison has an awkward reunion with Sam and Jenn; Sean Avery visits the restaurant and challenges Kevin to an eating contest. Patty agrees to accompany Detective Tammy at a work party, and Detective Tammy reveals romantic interest in Patty. Allison confronts Nick, demanding to know the exact details of his plan to kill Kevin.
7	7	"Broken"	Anna Dokoza	Valerie Armstrong, Craig DiGregorio & Kate Loveless	July 25, 2021	0.261
Allison and Nick plan out the murder: Nick will break into the house, stage a robbery and kill Kevin while Allison is out of town. To evade any suspicions from the police, Allison abruptly ends her affair with Sam and visits a fertility clinic under the pretense that she and Kevin are trying for a baby. Neil later questions Kevin after discovering Allison's fertility clinic pamphlet in the trash. Meanwhile, Patty pursues a romantic relationship with Detective Tammy. Following a tense dinner with Jenn's parents, Sam and Jenn get into an argument over them, the diner, and their own marriage, causing Sam to storm out. After being forced to flee town, Nick decides to kill Kevin a week earlier than planned, though he does not inform Allison. That night, Allison and Kevin hear Nick breaking into the house. Kevin leaves the room to investigate the noise; a loud gunshot is heard.
8	8	"Fixed"	Anna Dokoza	Valerie Armstrong	August 1, 2021	0.337
It is revealed that Kevin had shot Nick during the break-in and that Nick has been placed in a coma. After the townspeople praise Kevin for his actions, he decides to run for local office. To evade any suspicion of Patty, Allison and Patty attempt to frame Nick as the local dealer, planting the drugs and cash in his bedroom. Sam leaves Jenn and tells Allison that he wants to begin a genuine relationship with her. Allison refuses, stating that moving on with Sam would be "giving up." After being interrogated by Detective Tammy, Allison believes that Tammy is suspicious of her and manipulates Patty into checking Tammy's notebook; Patty feels guilty for doing so, resulting in an argument between her and Allison. Neil, who is in the kitchen playing hide-and-seek with Kevin, hears the argument and learns of Allison's plans to kill Kevin. After Patty leaves, Neil confronts Allison and threatens to call Kevin. When Allison tries to grab his phone, he chokes her. Patty suddenly arrives and violently smashes a bottle over Neil's head, resulting in him bleeding on the ground.

=== Season 2 (2022) ===
No. overall	No. in season	Title	Directed by	Written by	Original release date	U.S. viewers (millions)
9	1	"Mrs. McRoberts Is Dead"	Anna Dokoza	Valerie Armstrong	August 22, 2022	0.187
Allison and Patty try to figure out what to do with Neil, and finally decide to take him to the basement, where they bind him and tie him up to a pole. The next morning, Neil returns to consciousness and lambasts both women for trying to kill Kevin. Against Allison's wishes, Patty takes Neil to the hospital for his bleeding; Patty calls Allison out for always playing the victim. Kevin and Pete film an advertisement for Kevin's political campaign, but Kevin receives a call from the mayor informing him that he's been disqualified from the running. Allison's aunt Diane confides to Allison over her abusive husband Chuck, who has been cheating on her; Allison comforts Diane and takes her out for drinks. At the bar, Kevin's political advertisement plays on the television. Allison is dismayed to discover that Kevin's commercial has gone viral, and Kevin is now a local celebrity. Allison figures out another way on how to get rid of Kevin: she will fake her own death.
10	2	"The Way We Were"	Anna Dokoza	Craig DiGregorio	August 29, 2022	0.220
Wanting to know how to fake her own death, Allison tries to set up a meeting with private investigator Billy Terrell, who demands that she pay $350 upfront. Unable to pay this, Allison tries to pawn Kevin's Wade Boggs rookie card, but discovers that Kevin had stolen the card eight years ago, making it worthless. She also finds out that Sam has fired her from the diner out of spite. Neil gets discharged from the hospital early. Traumatized by the bottle incident, Neil breaks down in front of Patty. Kevin interviews with the local paper. Neil tries to warn Kevin about Allison's plot to murder him, but Kevin doesn't take him seriously. Tammy temporarily moves in with Patty when her power cuts out, but Tammy is put off by Patty's withdrawn behavior and decides to leave. Patty confesses to Tammy that she's dealing with some issues, but still wants to continue their relationship. Allison gives Billy her valuable pearl necklace in exchange for his services; Billy accepts the offer.
11	3	"Ghost"	Anna Dokoza	Sean Clements & Kate Loveless	September 5, 2022	0.150
Allison meets with Billy at a mortuary that takes in unclaimed dead bodies; Patty joins her despite promising to join Tammy for game night. Patty finds a possible identity in Gertrude Fronch, a single woman with zero online presence and no close family or friends, but Allison is reluctant. Neil is having trouble sleeping. Kevin hosts a super scary "Pal-o-ween", a Halloween tradition in which he and Neil watch horror movies together. When Allison and Patty return home, Kevin accidentally kicks the door into Allison's face, resulting in her cheek being swollen, and blames her for scaring him. Following this, Allison ultimately agrees to take up Gertrude Fronch as her new identity. In flashbacks, it is revealed that Allison's mother had an abusive personality similar to Kevin's. Flashbacks also depict Allison meeting Patty, Neil and Kevin at a bar; Patty does not warn Allison about Kevin's true behavior. Guest star: Peri Gilpin
12	4	"Jesus, Allison"	Anna Dokoza	Grace Edwards	September 12, 2022	0.140
Allison decides to throw a surprise birthday party for Patty, though Kevin believes it is a bad idea. Kevin gets Neil to distract Patty for the day, while Tammy agrees to help Allison plan for the party despite their disagreements. Pete has a new girlfriend, Lorraine, whom Kevin dislikes because she has an annoying laugh. Patty's surprise party is disastrous, as it is revealed that Tammy had invited Patty's long-time salon clients, unaware that they are also Patty's former drug clients. During the party, Diane storms out when she is insulted by Pete and Kevin. Neil joins Diane outside and they bond. Tammy warns Allison to stop spending so much time with Patty. Allison learns from Billy that she needs Gertrude's death certificate from City Hall before it is put into the system. Allison turns to Sam, who gives her contact information for a City Hall employee. When Sam questions her intentions, Allison admits that she is faking her own death. The police trace Nick's Oxy bottle to the gas station in Vermont; Tammy receives security footage of Patty entering the gas station.
13	5	"The Unreliable Narrator"	Anna Dokoza	Sean Clements	September 19, 2022	0.141
Allison and Patty meet with Sam's contact—a disgruntled City Hall employee who knows the layout of the building. When Worcester experiences a city-wide blackout, Allison and Patty take advantage of the situation by breaking into the City Hall building; they successfully retrieve Gertrude's death certificate. Patty reveals to Allison that she plans to move in with Tammy. During the blackout, Kevin decides to wait things out at Sam's diner with Neil, Pete, Diane and Lorraine. When Kevin's generator goes missing, he deduces that Neil was the one who stole it, deeply upsetting Neil. Diane goes outside to comfort Neil, and he kisses her. When the group discovers that Kevin was the cause of the blackout and destroyed Lorraine’s hearing aid out of spite, Sam demands that Kevin apologize for his actions, but Kevin refuses. After the power returns, Allison and Sam have an honest discussion about their relationship; Sam apologizes for his poor behavior and vows to help Allison with her plan. Guest star: Rachel Dratch
14	6	"The Machine"	Anna Dokoza	Kate Loveless & Jasmyne Peck	September 26, 2022	0.177
Diane and Neil have begun a sexual relationship, much to Allison's dismay; Diane reveals at an AA meeting that being with Neil has helped maintain her sobriety. Diane and Neil argue when he bails on their date; Neil feels that he's neglecting his friendship with Kevin and insults Diane, spurring her to end their fling. When Neil gets arrested for drunkenness, Diane bails him out, and Neil confesses that he's not okay. As Patty prepares to move in with Tammy, a concerned Tammy shows Allison the surveillance footage of Patty entering the gas station; Allison shrugs it off as a misunderstanding. Allison discovers that Sam and Jenn are getting a divorce, which has resulted in Jenn's parents claiming ownership of the diner. Allison manipulates Kevin into issuing a slip-and-fall lawsuit against the diner, after which Jenn's parents relinquish their move to seize ownership of the diner to avoid the payout. Allison reveals to Sam that she's not ready to leave Worcester. Realizing that she can use Kevin's destructive abilities to her benefit, Allison informs Sam that she plans to stay by weaponizing Kevin against Tammy.
15	7	"The Problem"	Craig DiGregorio	Craig DiGregorio	October 3, 2022	0.158
After being bailed out of jail by Diane, Neil has gone missing. Allison discovers that Neil had told Diane about her plan to kill Kevin, although Diane does not believe the story is real, dismissing it as a drunken ramble. The police have begun an investigation on the fire that started the city-wide blackout; Kevin tries to prevent Tammy from figuring out that he's the arsonist. While searching for Neil, Allison is confronted by a hostile Tammy, who believes that Allison was involved in the crime that occurred at the gas station in Vermont. Allison eventually tracks down Neil at a local bar; Neil, whose mental health is clearly deteriorating, demands that Allison stay away from him and Patty. Tammy confronts Patty with the security footage of her at the gas station. When Patty refuses to say anything, Tammy leaves, tearfully wishing her good luck. Patty informs Allison that Tammy knows about the two of them and Nick; Allison promises that she will fix everything. The next day, Allison runs away, leaving behind a note for Sam to give to Patty. The episode concludes with Allison looking at new apartments under her new identity as Gertrude Fronch.
16	8	"Allison's House"	Valerie Armstrong	Valerie Armstrong	October 10, 2022	0.184
Six months later, Allison has moved to Danforth, Maine, Kevin has a new girlfriend named Molly, and most of Worcester presumes that Allison is dead. Tammy visits Allison, having tailed her after she went missing, and reveals that Nick has died and that the department is dropping his case. Tammy quits her job and urges Patty to move away from Worcester with her; Patty refuses, and the two break up. Pete, tired of Kevin's behavior, moves out to live with Lorraine in Florida, but he refuses to disclose Lorraine's address to Kevin. Kevin walks in on Neil and Diane kissing and mocks them. Later at a bar, Neil retorts that he is sick of Kevin's mistreatment and tells him to leave, breaking off their friendship. Patty kicks Neil out of the house. Neil confesses his love to Diane; she rebuffs him, stating it is not her job to make him a better person, but she encourages him to get his life together for his own sake. Allison returns to Worcester and warns Molly about Kevin's behavior. Later, when Kevin tells a disconcerted Molly to move in with him, she abruptly leaves. Allison returns home and tells Kevin that she wants a divorce. Kevin is initially confused, then reacts violently, threatening to ruin her life. After Allison leaves, Kevin drinks heavily and begins to burn Allison's belongings; he calls Pete, Neil, and Molly, leaving them increasingly vicious and hateful verbally abusive voicemails after none of them takes his calls. After Kevin passes out in a drunken stupor, the fire spreads and engulfs the house, which is witnessed by the whole neighborhood, including Patty and Neil. With Kevin dead, Patty sits on the steps of the now burned-down house and is joined by Allison; they tearfully embrace, and Allison reveals that she wants to stay in Worcester. They both pledge to "die alone together" as they watch the sunrise, ready for a new future without Kevin. Guest star: Erinn Hayes

== Production ==
=== Development ===
In November 2018, it was announced AMC had opened a writers' room on the series as part of its scripts-to-series development model, with Valerie Armstrong serving as creator and executive producer, with Rashida Jones and Will McCormack serving as executive producers under their Le Train Train banner. In October 2019, AMC ordered the series.

The show's title is an allusion to Kevin Can Wait, a 2016 CBS sitcom starring Kevin James, which was heavily criticized for the manner in which the lead character's wife (played by Erinn Hayes) was written out of the show in the second season. Although Kevin Can F**k Himself is not meant as a direct parody of Kevin Can Wait, that incident served as a jumping-off point for the creative team of Kevin Can F**k Himself to make a show exploring the implications of gender roles in American family sitcoms. On August 27, 2021, AMC renewed the series for a second season. On November 30, 2021, AMC confirmed the series would conclude after two seasons.

=== Casting ===
In February 2020, Annie Murphy joined the series' cast in the leading role. In March 2020, Eric Petersen, Mary Hollis Inboden and Alex Bonifer joined the cast in starring roles. In May 2020, Raymond Lee and Brian Howe also joined the cast in starring roles. In January 2021, Meghan Leathers and Candice Coke joined the cast in recurring roles.

In May 2022, Erinn Hayes from Kevin Can Wait was cast in a guest role.

=== Shooting Locations ===
The McRoberts house exteriors were shot on Nason Street in Brockton, Massachusetts. Other shooting locations around Massachusetts include Worcester, Hingham, Milton, Randolph, Canton, Common Market Restaurants in Quincy, and in Brockton the Campello Station of the United States Postal Service and the First Evangelical Lutheran Church.

== Reception ==
=== Critical reception ===
The first season of Kevin Can F**k Himself holds an 82% approval rating on review aggregator website Rotten Tomatoes, based on 60 reviews with an average rating of 6.80/10. The website's critical consensus reads, "Kevin Can F**k Himself's ambitious blend of genres don't always gel, but searing social commentary and a stellar performance from Annie Murphy make for an engaging watch." On Metacritic, the first season holds a rating of 65 out of 100, based on 25 critics, indicating "generally favorable reviews".

On Rotten Tomatoes, the second season holds an approval rating of 100% with an average rating of 7.7/10 based on 7 reviews.

=== Accolades ===
The first season episode "Live Free or Die" won the American Cinema Editors Award for Best Edited Multi-Camera Comedy Series, with "Fixed" and "The Grand Victorian" also nominated. The series was recognized with The ReFrame Stamp for hiring people of underrepresented gender identities, and of color. In 2023, the series was nominated by the Casting Society of America for the Outstanding Achievement in Casting - Television Pilot and First Season - Drama Artios award.
