= The Brittany Murphy Story =

- Promotional poster
- Genre: Biographical drama
- Written by: Peter Hunziker; Cynthia Riddle
- Directed by: Joe Menendez
- Starring: Amanda Fuller; Eric Petersen; Chloe Crampton; Adam Hagenbuch; Amy Davidson; Sherilyn Fenn
- Music by: Todd Haberman
- Country of origin: United States
- Original language: English

Production
- Executive producers: Sharon Bordas; Michael Moran; Fernando Szew
- Producer: Carrie LeGrand
- Cinematography: Kris Carillo
- Editor: Jared Bentley
- Running time: 86 minutes
- Production companies: MarVista Entertainment; LeGrand Productions

Original release
- Network: Lifetime
- Release: September 6, 2014

The Brittany Murphy Story is a 2014 American biographical drama television film about actress Brittany Murphy. It aired on Lifetime on September 6, 2014.

== Synopsis ==
The film tells the story of Brittany Murphy, from her rise in the 1990s in Hollywood, her relationship with actor Ashton Kutcher in the early 2000s, her problems with fame and self-esteem, to her mysterious death on December 20, 2009 at the age of 32.

== Cast ==
- Amanda Fuller as Brittany Murphy
- Eric Petersen as Simon Monjack
- Chloe Crampton as Morgan
- Sherilyn Fenn as Sharon Murphy
- Amy Davidson as Jackie
- Adam Hagenbuch as Ashton Kutcher
