= Single-camera setup =

Film or video production principally using only one camera

Diagram showing a single-camera setup

The single-camera setup is a method in which all of the various shots and camera angles are taken using the same camera.

The single-camera setup originally developed during the birth of the classical Hollywood cinema in the 1910s and has remained the standard mode of production for cinema. In television production, both single-camera and multiple-camera methods are commonly used.

== Description ==
In this setup, all of the various shots and camera angles are taken using the same camera, or multiple cameras pointed in one direction, which are moved and reset to get a new angle. If a scene cuts back and forth between actor A and actor B, the director will first point the camera toward A and run part or all of the scene from this angle, then move the camera to point at B, relight, and then run the same scene through from this angle. Choices can then be made during the post-production editing process for when in the scene to use each shot, and when to cut back and forth between the two (or usually more than two) angles. This also then allows parts of the scene to be removed if it is felt that the scene is too long. In practice, sometimes two cameras shooting from the same angle are used: one to capture a medium shot, the other a close-up during the same take.

By contrast, a multiple-camera setup consists of multiple cameras arranged to capture all of the different camera angles of the scene simultaneously, and the set must be lit to accommodate all camera setups concurrently. Multi-camera production generally results in faster but less versatile videography, whereas the single-camera setup is more time-consuming but gives the director more control over each shot.

== Television ==
Unlike film producers, who almost always opt for single-camera shooting, television producers need to make a distinct decision to shoot in either single-camera or multiple-camera mode.

Single-camera is mostly reserved for prime time dramas, made-for-TV movies, music videos and commercial advertisements, while soap operas, talk shows, game shows, reality television series, and sitcoms usually use the multiple-camera setup.

Multiple-camera shooting is the only way that an ensemble of actors presenting a single performance before a live audience can be recorded from multiple perspectives. Also, for standard, dialogue-driven domestic situation comedies, the multi-camera technique, which is cheaper and takes less production time, is typically used. Situation comedies may be shot in either multiple- or single-camera modes. It may be deemed preferable to use the single-camera technique especially if specific camera angles and camera movements for a feature film-like visual style are considered crucial to the success of the production, and if visual effects are to be frequently used.

Though multi-camera was the norm for American sitcoms during the 1950s (beginning with I Love Lucy), the 1960s saw increased technical standards in situation comedies, which came to have larger casts and used a greater number of different locations in episodes. Several comedy series of the era also made use of feature film techniques. To this end, many comedies of this period, including Leave It to Beaver, The Andy Griffith Show, and The Brady Bunch, used the single-camera technique. Apart from giving the shows a feature film style, this technique was better suited to the visual effects frequently used in these shows, such as magical appearances and disappearances and lookalike doubles in which the regular actors played a dual role. These effects were created using editing and optical printing techniques, and would have been difficult had the shows been shot using a multi-camera setup.

In the case of Get Smart, the single-camera technique also allowed the series to present fast-paced and tightly edited fight and action sequences reminiscent of the spy dramas that it parodied. Single-camera comedies were also prevalent into the early 1970s. With its large cast, varied locations, and seriocomic tone, the TV series M*A*S*H was shot using single-camera style. Happy Days began in 1974 as a single-camera series, before switching to the multi-camera setup in its second season. However, the success of All in the Family (which was taped with multiple cameras live in front of a studio audience, very much like a stage play) and Norman Lear's subsequent sitcom productions led to a renewed interest by sitcom producers in the multi-camera technique; by the latter part of the 1970s, most sitcoms again employed the multi-camera format.

By the mid-1970s, with domestic situation comedies in vogue, the multi-camera shooting style for sitcoms came to dominate and would continue to do so through the 1980s and 1990s, although the single-camera format was still seen in television series classified as comedy-drama or "dramedy". It was also used in rare exceptions with series such as The Young Indiana Jones Chronicles, which was an adventure series.

The early 21st-century Golden Age of Television saw a resurgence in the use of single-camera in sitcoms, such as in Malcolm in the Middle, Curb Your Enthusiasm, Arrested Development, The Office, It's Always Sunny in Philadelphia, Community, Parks and Recreation, The Middle, Schitt's Creek, Brooklyn Nine-Nine, New Girl, Scrubs, Ted Lasso, The Goldbergs, Young Sheldon, Unbreakable Kimmy Schmidt, 30 Rock, Modern Family, Abbott Elementary, Hacks, The Good Place, Adults, and Veep. Sitcoms produced for Disney Channel and Nickelodeon have favored the multiple-camera setup over the single-camera format, although notable single-camera examples include Lizzie McGuire and Big Time Rush. Unlike single-camera sitcoms from the past, nearly all contemporary comedies shot in this manner are produced without a laugh track.

The Disney+ series WandaVision from 2021 blends both types of camera usage throughout each episode. In episodes 1–5 with the exception of episode 4, the episodes were specifically made to replicate most multiple-camera sitcoms from the 1950s to the 1990s. Just like sitcoms from these years, these episodes have laugh tracks, upbeat music in its intros and obviously staged humour. In episodes 6–7, the show starts to more resemble single-camera sitcoms from the 2000s. However, both of these episodes are different from each other. Episode 6 rather resembles shows like Malcolm in the Middle with the children getting more focus and faster pacing. Episode 7 is more like a mockumentary, such as The Office with more adult targeted and slower humour.

The 2021 series Kevin Can F**k Himself explores the contrast between single-camera and multiple-camera television, blending both a multi-camera family sitcom format when lead character Allison is with her husband Kevin and a single-camera format when she is on her own.

== See also ==
- Hand-held camera – Filmmaking technique
- List of single-camera situation comedies
- Tapeless camcorder
