= Bad Shabbos =

2024 comedy film

- Theatrical release poster
- Directed by: Daniel Robbins
- Screenplay by: Zack Weiner; Daniel Robbins
- Produced by: Adam Mitchell
- Starring: Kyra Sedgwick; Method Man; Jon Bass; Milana Vayntrub
- Cinematography: Matt Clegg
- Edited by: Kait Plum
- Music by: Eli Keszler
- Production company: Carnegie Hill Entertainment
- Distributed by: Menemsha Films
- Release dates: June 10, 2024 (Tribeca Festival); December 6, 2024 (United States)
- Running time: 84 minutes
- Country: United States
- Language: English
- Box office: $1.6 million

Bad Shabbos is a 2024 American dark comedy film directed by Daniel Robbins and written by Robbins and Zack Weiner. The film stars Kyra Sedgwick as the matriarch of a Jewish family as tensions come to a head during a Shabbos dinner. It debuted at the Tribeca Film Festival where it won the Audience Award.

The title is a play on the phrase "good Shabbos," which is used as a traditional greeting on Shabbos.

== Plot summary ==
David and his fiancé, Meg, are visiting his traditionally affiliated Jewish family for a Friday night Shabbos dinner in New York City where her parents will meet the family for the first time. Meg was raised Catholic in Milwaukee and she is converting to Judaism. They encounter Jordan, the doorman of the apartment building where the parents live, who is friendly with the family, especially Richard, David's father, and talks with him about everything from family politics to the talmud. Ellen, the family matriarch, is not comfortable with or accepting of Meg due to her Catholic upbringing, and treats her passive-aggressively due to believing that she's not a good match for David. Living with Richard and Ellen is David's unemployed younger brother, Adam, who is on various medications for physical and mental ailments and who has aspirations of joining the IDF. Adam's sister Abby, the middle child, arrives with her boyfriend, the obnoxious and unfaithful Benjamin, who nobody in the family likes.

The children reveal the religious dynamics and traditions of the family: Ellen and Richard are strict with tradition, but while the children do their best to appear devout to please their parents, Abby and David admit in private that they actually do not really observe Shabbos unless their parents are watching. Meanwhile, Meg's parents text her to inform her that they are running late due to heavier than expected traffic. Benjamin and Adam, who have a contentious relationship, trade insults, and as payback for his belittling behavior, Adam spikes Benjamin's drink with laxatives from his medicine collection. Benjamin soon has to use the bathroom, and in his haste to get the toilet while unbuttoning his pants, he slips on the rug and hits his head on the sink. After learning Ben has colitis, a concerned Adam goes to check on him. He finds him locked in the bathroom, dead on the floor and having experienced involuntary loss of bowel control.

One by one, the family discovers the death and, mutually agreeing to not call an ambulance which may result in Adam being arrested, realize that they need to get rid of the body before Meg's parents find out and also to avoid detection so as not to be caught. With Jordan inadvertendly enlisted for help, they first try to smuggle the body out of the apartment and to Benjamin's to make it appear he died in a home accident, but the plan is interrupted by the arrival of Meg's parents. Leaving Benjamin in the bathroom, they attempt to host a ordinary dinner, but their desperate attempts to appear normal while covering up the death make the event awkward and strained. When Meg's parents inquire about Benjamin's whereabouts, the family struggles for an excuse, only to be saved by Jordan, who arrives at the dinner pretending to be Benjamin. However, the dinner ends poorly when Meg's parents feel insulted and end up leaving early.

Jordan and David again try to carry out Benjamin's body, but are interrupted by the arrival of the next doorman, who has shown up early to his shift and will expose the plot. Out of options, Adam offers to turn himself in, admitting that he knows he is the black sheep of the family, and revealing that he was rejected by the IDF but did not want anyone considering him a loser. Abby argues that it was her fault, as she had intended to break up with Benjamin but delayed to avoid embarrassing herself in front of the family. The parents also volunteer to take the fall to protect their children, with Ellen finally accepting Meg in the family due to her loyalty during the evening. However, before anyone can act, Jordan decides to try to solve the problem by dumping Benjamin's body from the balcony and into a garbage cart below, thus bypassing the other doorman; however, Benjamin's body lands beside the cart.

The family finally calls the police, preparing to be caught, but the arriving officer reveals that a suicide note (actually written by Jordan as further insurance) was found in Benjamin's pocket, clearing them of any suspicion. At Benjamin's funeral, Meg's parents arrive to pay their condolences, and they reconcile. However, they also observe that the dead Benjamin was not the one who they met at dinner, but only use the information as a bargaining chip to host all future Catholic holidays for Meg and David, to Ellen's chagrin.

== Cast ==
- Jon Bass as David, Meg's fiancé
- Meghan Leathers as Meg, David's fiancé
- Method Man as Jordan, the doorman
- Kyra Sedgwick as Ellen, David's mother
- David Paymer as Richard, David's father
- Ashley Zukerman as Benjamin, Abby's boyfriend
- Milana Vayntrub as Abby, David's sister
- Theo Taplitz as Adam, David's brother
- Catherine Curtin as Beth, Meg's mother
- John Bedford Lloyd as John, Meg's father

== Release ==
Bad Shabbos premiered on June 10, 2024, in the Spotlight Narrative section of that year's Tribeca Festival. It was released in the United States on May 23, 2025. The movie was later released on Netflix in October 2025.

== Reception ==
On the review aggregator website Rotten Tomatoes, 84% of 37 critics' reviews are positive. Metacritic, which uses a weighted average, assigned the film a score of 53 out of 100, based on six critics, indicating "mixed or average" reviews.

=== Accolades ===
Award	Ceremony date	Category	Recipient(s)	Result	Ref.
Tribeca Festival	16 June 2024	Audience Award	Bad Shabbos	Won	
