= Eric Petersen =

American actor

- Born: Carol Stream, Illinois, U.S.
- Education: Bradley University
- Occupation: Actor
- Years active: 2006–present
- Spouse: Lisa Marie Morabito (m. 2007)
- Children: 2

Eric Petersen is an American actor. He is best known for his starring role as the titular character in the AMC dark comedy series Kevin Can F**k Himself (2021–2022), and for playing the title character in the first US national tour of Shrek The Musical (2010).

== Early life and education ==
Petersen was born in Carol Stream, Illinois, a suburb of Chicago, and attended Glenbard North High School. He began acting during his freshman year of high school, after quitting the football team and subsequently missing soccer tryouts. His friend suggested that he audition for a role in the school production of The Hobbit, and the experience of playing that role inspired him to continue acting. Afterwards, he attended Bradley University, where he graduated in 2003 with a degree in theater. When he was 18, he had corrective surgery to address issues with his eyes.

== Career ==
After graduating from Bradley, Petersen took a role on the US national tour of The 25th Annual Putnam County Spelling Bee. He played William Barfee, one of the contestants in the eponymous spelling bee. He followed this effort with Shrek the Musical, serving as an understudy for the title character. When Shrek began its first national tour in 2010, Petersen served in the titular role.

Living in New York City at the time, Petersen made the transition into TV with a two-episode arc in the long-running soap opera As the World Turns. He played a "Bad Santa"-type criminal who held one of the main characters hostage as part of an attempted robbery. He followed this with a series of bit parts in shows such as The Big Bang Theory, Modern Family, and Law & Order: Special Victims Unit. In 2012, Petersen was cast as a series lead in Giant Baby, later renamed Kirstie, where he starred as Arlo, the long-lost son of Madison Banks (Kirstie Alley).

In 2021, Petersen starred opposite Annie Murphy as the titular character in the AMC dark comedy series Kevin Can F**k Himself. Petersen's character was meant to channel the stereotypical "sitcom husband", in the style of The King of Queens, The Honeymooners, and Family Guy, while revealing the dissatisfaction of Murphy's character, Allison.

Eric and producer Danny Jordan host the podcast; Christmas Countdown Show, in which the hosts countdown topics such as movies, TV, music, and special experiences. Eric also co-hosts the Perfect Albums Podcast with producer Chris Sisley. In each episode, the hosts talk about an album that they think is (basically) perfect.

== Personal life ==
Petersen married musical theater actress Lisa Marie Morabito, in 2007. They have two children.

== Filmography ==
=== Film ===
Year	Title	Role	Notes
2009	Evan and Gareth Are Trying to Get Laid	Hank	TV film
2013	Life with Maddie	Arlo Barth	Short film
2014	The Brittany Murphy Story	Simon Monjack	TV film
2014	Naughty & Nice	Jonah	TV film
2018	Groomzilla	Scoot	TV film
2018	The Ballad of Buster Scruggs	Boarder	Anthology film
2021	Raunch and Roll	Nia's father	

=== Television ===
Year	Title	Role	Notes
2007	As the World Turns	Santa #1	2 episodes
2010	Law & Order: Special Victims Unit	Jake	Episode: "Quickie"
2010	Law & Order	Anderson Leavitt	Episode: "Brazil"
2010	Outlaw	Stan Zaret	Episode: "Pilot"
2011	Modern Family	Tree Salesman	Episode: "Express Christmas"
2012	GCB	Angus Horvath	Episode: "Turn the Other Cheek"
2012	Jessie	Dr. Cyrus Van Adams	Episode: "We Are So Grounded"
2012–13	Pair of Kings	Catawampus	3 episodes
2013–14	Kirstie	Arlo Barth	Series regular
2014	The Big Bang Theory	Eric	Episode: "The Locomotive Manipulation"
2014	CSI: Crime Scene Investigation	Todd Burris	Episode: "Consumed"
2015	F'd	Ronnie	Episode: "Trapped in the Closet"
2015	Kirby Buckets	Mr. Gibonson	Episode: "Balloonacy!" (voice role)
2016	NCIS	'Pale' Dale Matteson	Episode: "Shell Game"
2019	Sydney to the Max	Don	3 episodes
2020–21	Madagascar: A Little Wild	Ant'ney, various voice roles	19 episodes
2021–22	Kevin Can F**k Himself	Kevin McRoberts	Main role
2022	Winning Time: The Rise of the Lakers Dynasty	Stan	Episode: "Memento Mori"
2023	The Curse	Dennis (mistakenly credited as "Eric Peterson")	Episode: "It's a Good Day"
2026	The Beauty	Gunther Forst	Episode: "

=== Theatre ===
Year	Title	Role	Notes
2006–07	The 25th Annual Putnam County Spelling Bee	William Barfee	US national tour
2009–10	Shrek the Musical	Shrek	Broadway Understudy/Standby
2010–11	Shrek the Musical	Shrek	US national tour
2012–13	Peter and the Starcatcher	Ted	Off-Broadway Replacement
2015	Elf	Buddy	North American tour
2016-17	School of Rock	Dewey	Broadway Replacement
2017	Escape to Margaritaville	Brick	North American tour
2018	Escape to Margaritaville	Brick	Original Broadway cast
2018	Mamma Mia	Bill Austin	Wells Fargo Pavilion
2019	Something Rotten!	Nick Bottom	Musical Theatre West

== Awards and nominations ==
Year	Association	Category	Work	Result	Ref.
2021	Daytime Creative Arts Emmy Awards	Outstanding Performer in a Preschool Animated Program	Madagascar: A Little Wild	Nominated	
