= Daniel Robbins (director) =

American filmmaker

- Occupation(s): Film director, screenwriter

Daniel Robbins is an American filmmaker best known for the 2018 horror film Pledge and the 2024 comedy Bad Shabbos which won the Audience Award at the Tribeca Film Festival.

== Career ==
Following the release of his documentary feature The Convenient Job, Robbins' werewolf film Uncaged was released in 2016 through RLJ Entertainment. Pledge, Robbins' horror film set in a college fraternity, premiered in 2018.

Robbins' documentary Citizen Weiner, detailing frequent collaborator Zack Weiner's New York City Council campaign, premiered at the 2024 Slamdance Film Festival. That same year, his narrative feature Bad Shabbos, starring Kyra Sedgwick and Method Man, debuted at the Tribeca Festival.

== Filmography ==
Year	Title	Notes	Ref.
2015	The Convenient Job	Documentary	
2016	Uncaged	—	
2018	Pledge	—	
2024	Citizen Weiner	Documentary	
2024	Bad Shabbos	—	

== Awards and nominations ==
Year	Award	Category	Nominated work	Result	Ref.
2018	Screamfest Horror Film Festival	Best Director	Pledge	Won	
2024	Tribeca Film Festival	Audience Award	Bad Shabbos	Won	
