= Meghan Leathers =

American actress

- Born: September 23, 1990 (age 35); Providence, Rhode Island, United States
- Occupation: Actress
- Years active: 2011–present

Meghan Leathers is an American actress. She is best known for playing Pam Horton in the sci-fi drama series For All Mankind and Jenn in the comedy series Kevin Can F**k Himself.

== Early life ==
Leathers was born in Providence, Rhode Island, on September 23, 1990. She earned a Master of Fine Arts (MFA) in Acting and Performance from the Brown/Trinity Rep program.

== Career ==
Leathers made her on-screen debut in the short film Last Stop Montauk. She also made early career appearances in the short film Rabbi, Fireman, Dinosaur, X's on Trees, Entropic and Thread before making her tv debut on an episode of the documentary series The Hunt with John Walsh. She first gained national recognition for playing Jenn in the comedy series Kevin Can F**k Himself. . She appeared as a media quant in the black comedy film Don't Look Up starring Jennifer Lawrence and Leonardo DiCaprio. Her biggest role so far has been playing Pam Horton on the sci-fi drama series For All Mankind. She starred alongside more A-list actors such as Tommy Lee Jones and Jenna Ortega when she played Kathy in the crime thriller film Finestkind. She starred as the Catholic turned Jewish Meg in the dark comedy film Bad Shabbos.

== Filmography ==
=== Film ===
Year	Title	Role	Notes
2011	Last Stop Montauk	Joanna	Short
2014	Rabbi, Fireman, Dinosaur	Frankie DeMarco	Short
2015	X's on Trees	Molly	Short
2016	Entropic	Vanessa	Short
2016	Thread	Lucy	Short
2017	American Waste	Jess	Short
2021	Don't Look Up	Media Quant	
2023	Finestkind	Kathy	
2024	Water Dog	Harriet	Short
2024	Bad Shabbos	Meg	
2026	Conflicting Reports	Woman	

=== Television ===
Year	Title	Role	Notes
2014	The Hunt with John Walsh	Extra Girl #4	Episode; The Enemy Next Door
2015	Law & Order: Special Victims Unit	Jane	Episode; Devastating Story
2022	Partner Track	Wanda Jean	3 episodes
2021-2022	Kevin Can F**k Himself	Jenn	5 episodes
2019-2023	For All Mankind	Pam Horton	17 episodes
2025	S.W.A.T.	Martha	Episode; The Heights
