= Pledge (film) =

- Theatrical release poster
- Directed by: Daniel Robbins
- Written by: Zack Weiner
- Produced by: Mark Rapaport; Keaton Heinrichs
- Starring: Zachery Byrd; Aaron Dalla Villa; Zack Weiner; Phillip Andre Botello; Cameron Cowperthwaite; Jesse Pimentel
- Cinematography: William Tracy Babcock
- Edited by: Nik Voytas
- Music by: John Natchez
- Production companies: Stag Pictures; BoulderLight Pictures
- Distributed by: IFC Midnight
- Release dates: July 24, 2018 (Fantasia International Film Festival); January 11, 2019 (USA)
- Running time: 78 minutes
- Country: United States
- Language: English

Pledge is a 2018 American horror film, written by Zack Weiner, directed by Daniel Robbins, and produced by Mark Rapaport and Keaton Heinrichs. The film centers on collegiate hazing taken to extremes. It had its world premiere at the 2018 Fantasia International Film Festival, and was released in theaters and on VOD on January 11, 2019, through IFC Midnight.

== Cast ==
- Zachery Byrd as Justin
- Aaron Dalla Villa as Max
- Zack Weiner as David
- Phillip Andre Botello as Ethan
- Cameron Cowperthwaite as Ricky
- Jesse Pimentel as Bret
- Joe Gallagher as Ben
- Jean-Louis Droulers as Sam
- Erica Boozer as Rachel
- Melanie Rothman as Stacey

== Production ==
Pledge finished its principal photography in the summer of 2016 in New Rochelle, NY and New York City. Part of the film's post-production finances were sourced through Kickstarter.

== Release ==
The film had its world premiere at the 2018 Fantasia International Film Festival on July 24, 2018, and its United States premiere on October 14, 2018, at Screamfest, where it won awards for Best Directing (Daniel Robbins) and Best Editing (Nik Voytas). The film was later released theatrically and on VOD via IFC Midnight. Pledge had a limited theatrical release in 20 cities across the United States, with additional theatrical releases in Latin America through foreign distributors.

=== Critical reception ===
On the review aggregator website Rotten Tomatoes, 76% of 29 critics' reviews are positive. The website's consensus reads: "Pledge leaves a certain amount of potential untapped in its extreme take on collegiate hazing, but the end result is still well-executed enough to be worth a watch." On Metacritic, the film has a weighted average score of 54 out of 100 based on 7 critics, which the site labels as "mixed or average" reviews.

Jeanette Catsoulis of The New York Times called the film "a ringing indictment of popularity as the cheese in a deadly mousetrap" and praised Zachery Byrd's performance as Justin, in particular. Dennis Harvey of Variety called Pledge, "a lean and mean shocker that tells its tale of collegiate hazing run amuck with brute efficiency." Noel Murray of The Los Angeles Times said "the movie understands that — whether comedy or horror — all these stories are really about a desperate yearning for belonging."
