= Charlie Thurston (actor) =

American actor

- Born: Charles Thomas Thurston; Prairie Village, Kansas, U.S.
- Education: Cornell College (BA); Brown University (MFA)
- Occupations: Actor, singer, playwright
- Spouse: Rebecca Gibel (m. 2015)

Charles Thomas Thurston is an American actor, singer, and playwright, known for his work in the theatre.

== Early life and education ==
Thurston was raised in Prairie Village, Kansas, the son of Cathie and Thomas Thurston (1948-2015). His father was a lawyer. He has one brother, Joseph. He graduated from Shawnee Mission East High School in 2004, and from Cornell College with a BA in Acting and Playwrighting in 2008. He then went on to Brown University, where he earned his MFA in Acting through the Brown/Trinity Repertory Company program, graduating in 2012. At Brown, he was a Stephen Sondheim Fellow. While in college, he was an intern at the Redmoon Theater in Chicago, and performed during the summer at Creede Repertory Theatre in Colorado. He also was enrolled in the acting conservatory at the Chautauqua Theater Company in Chautauqua, New York.

== Career ==
Thurston is a member of the theatre group known as The Williams Project, later renamed The Feast, based in Seattle, Washington.

He made his Broadway debut as Bill in 2025 in Liberation. Thurston was in the original cast of Here There Are Blueberries, originating the role Rainer Höss & others in 2022.

In 2025, Someone Will Remember Us, a play he co-wrote with Deborah Salem-Smith, premiered at Trinity Repertory Company.

Thurston also works as a voice artist and has narrated audio books.

His film work includes supporting roles in Money Monster (2016), Life Itself (2018), Finestkind (2023), Boston Strangler.

On television, he had a recurring role of Roland in the Julia Child series, Julia (2022-2023).

== Personal life ==
Thurston is married to actress Rebecca Gibel. The couple met during college at Brown University.

== Theatre (select) ==
Year	Project	Role	Venue	Ref.
2017	Shakespeare in Love	William Shakespeare	Cleveland Play House	
2018	Othello	Cassio	Trinity Repertory Company	
2018	Ragtime	Tateh	Trinity Repertory Company	
2018	Cyrano: A New Musical	Montgomery	Goodspeed Opera House	
2019	The Song of Summer	Robbie Retton	Trinity Repertory Company	
2019	Marisol	Lenny	Trinity Repertory Company	
2019	The Prince of Providence	Ensemble	Trinity Repertory Company	
2022	Here There Are Blueberries	Rainer Höss and others	La Jolla Playhouse	
2025	Macbeth in Stride	Macbeth	Brooklyn Academy of Music	
2025	Liberation	Bill	James Earl Jones Theatre, Broadway	
2026	Imitation of life	Archie	The Shed, Off-Broadway	

== Works (select) ==
Full Length Written Plays:

- Someone Will Remember Us
- Lifted - adaptation of Icarus. World Premiere 2022 at the Filigree Theatre, Austin, Texas.
- Radical
- The History Room
- Empire
- A and B
- The Getaway Driver
