= Teatro Bradesco =

Theatre in São Paulo, Brazil

- Address: São Paulo
- Operator: Banco Bradesco; Companhia Zaffari
- Capacity: 1439

Construction
- Opened: 2009

Website
- http://www.teatrobradesco.com.br/

The Teatro Bradesco is a theater located in the Bourbon Shopping shopping center in São Paulo, Brazil with a capacity of 1,439 people.

== History ==
The theater was opened in September 2009 and is operated through a partnership between Companhia Zaffari and Opus Promoções.
