= Finestkind =

2023 American film by Brian Helgeland

- Official release poster
- Directed by: Brian Helgeland
- Written by: Brian Helgeland
- Produced by: Gary Foster; Russ Krasnoff; Taylor Sheridan; David C. Glasser
- Starring: Ben Foster; Toby Wallace; Jenna Ortega; Tommy Lee Jones
- Cinematography: Crille Forsberg
- Edited by: Stuart Levy
- Music by: Carter Burwell
- Production companies: 101 Studios; Bosque Ranch Productions; Between Two Trees Entertainment
- Distributed by: Paramount+
- Release dates: September 8, 2023 (TIFF); December 15, 2023
- Running time: 126 minutes
- Country: United States
- Language: English

Finestkind is a 2023 American crime thriller film written and directed by Brian Helgeland. The film stars Ben Foster, Toby Wallace, Jenna Ortega, and Tommy Lee Jones.

== Plot ==
On a visit to New Bedford, Massachusetts, college alumnus Charlie pays a visit to his elder half-brother Tom Eldrige, a scallop fisherman. Disillusioned with his systematic life, he asks Tom to take him on his upcoming fishing excursion, which he reluctantly agrees to. Sailing out on Tom's boat, the Harmony, Charlie is introduced to the crew—Nunes a.k.a. "Nunesy", family man Costa, and drug addict Skeemo. Hours into the voyage, the Harmony suffers an internal explosion on rough seas, causing it to sink; the crew narrowly survives.

Upon being rescued the following morning, the five go to a bar to celebrate their ordeal, where Charlie encounters Mabel, a small-time drug dealer. His wealthy father, Gary Sykes, who tracks him down, attempts to convince him against fishing, but is bluntly rebuffed. Later, the brothers visit Tom's employers; there, both Tom and his egotistic boss accuse each other of incompetence, which leads to a brawl, causing Tom to be fired.

Later, Tom is approached by his aging father, Ray, who asks him to captain his boat, the Finestkind, on a dredging excursion in his stead, which Tom reluctantly acquiesces to. Later, at a house party hosted by Costa, Tom informs the others of the assignment; whilst there, Mabel takes Charlie for a drug run, during which he meets her skeptical mother. After the meeting ends poorly, he crashes at Mabel's apartment, where the two share a night of ecstasy. Waking up late the next day, the two learn that Tom is about to leave without him, in response, Mabel rushes Charlie to the harbor, barely making it to the Finestkind just before it departs. At sea, Tom decides to take the boat to illegally fish in Canadian waters in the hopes of securing more lucrative catches. The gambit nearly succeeds, but the boat accidentally ensnares itself in its fishing dredge and is spotted by a Canadian pilot who reports them.

Returning to port, the Finestkind is seized by U.S. authorities, much to the crew's dismay. Resolving to tell Ray of the incident, the two learn he is hospitalized with terminal stomach cancer—the actual reason for his absence. Not wanting his father to die without his beloved boat, Tom approaches his former employers to bail him out on the $100,000 fine that had been conditioned for the boat's release but is scornfully rejected. Sympathetic to their plight, Mabel arranges for the crew to participate in a one-time heroin smuggling gig with Weeks, her mother's partner. Despite the crew's acceptance, Tom fears being caught but is convinced otherwise.

The crew sail out to the drop spot, where a plane delivers the heroin. Returning to port, the brothers head off alone to meet Weeks, but are cornered by rival dealers, who make away with the heroin after subduing them. Realizing they have been betrayed, Tom accuses Mabel of snitching on them, leading to a fight which is witnessed by Ray. Consequently, Weeks corners the crew at Costa's home, having taken Costa's pregnant wife hostage. He forces them to deliver the heroin by the following morning, threatening them with death should they fail; he reveals that he had assaulted Mabel.

After Weeks leaves, the crew helps Costa's wife, whereupon Tom disappears. Whilst searching for him, Ray corners Charlie, who divulges their quagmire. The next morning, Charlie meets Nunesy, who tells him that Tom had taken a pistol with him to see Skeemo. Realizing Skeemo was the snitch, Charlie races over to his place, arriving just as Tom is about to execute him. Charlie manages to convince him otherwise, opting to take their chances instead.

Ray appears at Weeks' meeting point with an offer of $15,000 in exchange for leaving the crew alone. When Weeks refuses and proceeds to mock him, Ray shoots and kills him and two associates, just as the brothers arrive. Ray explains to an emotionally moved Tom that he would do anything to save him.

Gary agrees to pay the fine on the boat, realizing he cannot change his son, whilst Mabel prepares to enter college. Finally free, the crew prepare to sail on the Finestkind once more, while an incarcerated yet happy Ray watches from a distance.

== Cast ==
- Ben Foster as Tom
- Toby Wallace as Charlie
- Jenna Ortega as Mabel
- Tommy Lee Jones as Ray Eldridge
- Ismael Cruz Córdova as Costa
- Aaron Stanford as Skeemo
- Scotty Tovar as Nunes
- Tim Daly as Gary Sykes
- Lolita Davidovich as Donna Sykes
- Clayne Crawford as Pete Weeks
- Lonnie Farmer as Rocky
- Fernanda Andrade as Anne-Marie
- Charlie Thurston as Mr. White
- Meghan Leathers as Kathy
- Brian McDonald as Paul
- Chris Matacunas as Mark
- Rebecca Gibel as Paulette

== Production ==
Brian Helgeland wrote the script in the 1980s. Two decades later, he was set to make the film with Heath Ledger starring but Ledger passed away. In 2018, Jake Gyllenhaal, Ansel Elgort and Zendaya were attached to star in the film with Helgeland directing his screenplay.

In April 2022, it was announced that Paramount+ had acquired the rights to the film with Tommy Lee Jones, Ben Foster, Toby Wallace and Jenna Ortega starring. Later that month, it was announced that Tim Daly, Clayne Crawford, Aaron Stanford, Scotty Tovar and Lolita Davidovich had been added to the cast. Meghan Leathers also joined the cast in April 2022.

Filming began in New Bedford, Massachusetts in April 2022. Filming was completed in May 2022.

Some of the crew have made claims of not getting paid, and injury while on set.

== Release ==
The film premiered at the Toronto International Film Festival on September 8, 2023, and was added to the Paramount+ catalogue on December 15, 2023.

== Reception ==
On the review aggregator website Rotten Tomatoes, 27% of 33 critics' reviews are positive, with an average rating of 5.0/10. Metacritic, which uses a weighted average, assigned the film a score of 44 out of 100, based on 7 critics, indicating "mixed or average" reviews.
